= 2026 OFC Professional League circuit series =

International football club competition in Oceania

The 2026 OFC Professional League Circuit Series was held from 17 January to 21 April 2026.

== Schedule ==
Round	Dates	Location
Circuit 1	17–24 January 2026	(New Zealand) Auckland
Circuit 2	31 January – 8 February 2026	(Papua New Guinea) Port Moresby
Circuit 3	21–28 February 2026	(Australia) Melbourne
Circuit 4	14–19 March 2026	(Solomon Islands) Honiara
Circuit 5	11–18 April 2026	(Fiji) Ba & Suva

== Circuit series table ==
Pos	Team	Pld	W	D	L	GF	GA	GD	Pts	Qualification
1	(New Zealand) Auckland FC	14	10	2	2	26	10	+16	32	Qualification for Leaders play-off group
2	(Australia) South Melbourne	14	7	4	3	40	18	+22	25	Qualification for Leaders play-off group
3	(Fiji) Bula FC	14	6	3	5	14	15	−1	21	Qualification for Leaders play-off group
4	(New Zealand) South Island United	14	5	5	4	24	26	−2	20	Qualification for Leaders play-off group
5	(Solomon Islands) Solomon Kings	14	5	3	6	14	21	−7	18	Qualification for Challengers play-off group
6	(French Polynesia) Tahiti United	14	4	5	5	20	28	−8	17	Qualification for Challengers play-off group
7	Vanuatu United	14	3	4	7	20	25	−5	13	Qualification for Challengers play-off group
8	(Papua New Guinea) PNG Hekari	14	2	2	10	14	29	−15	8	Qualification for Challengers play-off group

Source: OFC Pro League
Rules for classification: 1) Points; 2) Goal difference; 3) Goals scored; 4) Head to head; 5) Head to head goal difference; 6) Head to head goals scored; 7) Disciplinary record; 8) Coin toss

== Results ==
Circuit 1
Home team	Score	Away team
Vanuatu United	2–2	(Fiji) Bula FC
Auckland FC (New Zealand)	3–0	(New Zealand) South Island United
Tahiti United (French Polynesia)	1–2	(Australia) South Melbourne
PNG Hekari (Papua New Guinea)	0–1	(Solomon Islands) Solomon Kings
Bula FC (Fiji)	0–0	(New Zealand) South Island United
Auckland FC (New Zealand)	3–1	Vanuatu United
Tahiti United (French Polynesia)	2–1	(Papua New Guinea) PNG Hekari
South Melbourne (Australia)	5–0	(Solomon Islands) Solomon Kings
South Island United (New Zealand)	2–1	Vanuatu United
Auckland FC (New Zealand)	1–0	(Fiji) Bula FC
Solomon Kings (Solomon Islands)	0–0	(French Polynesia) Tahiti United
PNG Hekari (Papua New Guinea)	0–5	(Australia) South Melbourne

Circuit 2
Home team	Score	Away team
Vanuatu United	2–2	(French Polynesia) Tahiti United
PNG Hekari (Papua New Guinea)	0–2	(New Zealand) Auckland FC
South Island United (New Zealand)	3–3	(Australia) South Melbourne
Bula FC (Fiji)	1–0	(Solomon Islands) Solomon Kings
Tahiti United (French Polynesia)	0–4	(New Zealand) Auckland FC
PNG Hekari (Papua New Guinea)	2–2	Vanuatu United
Solomon Kings (Solomon Islands)	0–0	(New Zealand) South Island United
Bula FC (Fiji)	1–1	(Australia) South Melbourne
Auckland FC (New Zealand)	1–3	(Solomon Islands) Solomon Kings
PNG Hekari (Papua New Guinea)	1–2	(New Zealand) South Island United
South Melbourne (Australia)	5–2	Vanuatu United
Tahiti United (French Polynesia)	1–0	(Fiji) Bula FC

Circuit 3
Home team	Score	Away team
Tahiti United (French Polynesia)	2–2	(New Zealand) South Island United
South Melbourne (Australia)	1–1	(New Zealand) Auckland FC
Bula FC (Fiji)	0–2	Vanuatu United
Solomon Kings (Solomon Islands)	2–1	(Papua New Guinea) PNG Hekari
South Island United (New Zealand)	1–3	(New Zealand) Auckland FC
South Melbourne (Australia)	8–1	(French Polynesia) Tahiti United
Vanuatu United	2–0	(Solomon Islands) Solomon Kings
PNG Hekari (Papua New Guinea)	1–2	(Fiji) Bula FC
Auckland FC (New Zealand)	1–0	(French Polynesia) Tahiti United
South Melbourne (Australia)	4–1	(New Zealand) South Island United
Vanuatu United	1–3	(Papua New Guinea) PNG Hekari
Solomon Kings (Solomon Islands)	2–0	(Fiji) Bula FC

Circuit 4
Home team	Score	Away team
South Island United (New Zealand)	4–1	(Papua New Guinea) PNG Hekari
Solomon Kings (Solomon Islands)	0–1	(New Zealand) Auckland FC
Vanuatu United	2–0	(Australia) South Melbourne
Bula FC (Fiji)	2–0	(French Polynesia) Tahiti United
Vanuatu United	0–0	(New Zealand) Auckland FC
PNG Hekari (Papua New Guinea)	2–2	(French Polynesia) Tahiti United
South Island United (New Zealand)	2–3	(Fiji) Bula FC
Solomon Kings (Solomon Islands)	1–1	(Australia) South Melbourne

Circuit 5
Home team	Score	Away team
Vanuatu United	1–2	(New Zealand) South Island United
Tahiti United (French Polynesia)	5–1	(Solomon Islands) Solomon Kings
Auckland FC (New Zealand)	3–2	(Australia) South Melbourne
Bula FC (Fiji)	1–0	(Papua New Guinea) PNG Hekari
South Island United (New Zealand)	3–3	(French Polynesia) Tahiti United
Solomon Kings (Solomon Islands)	3–2	Vanuatu United
Auckland FC (New Zealand)	2–0	(Papua New Guinea) PNG Hekari
South Melbourne (Australia)	2–0	(Fiji) Bula FC
South Island United (New Zealand)	2–1	(Solomon Islands) Solomon Kings
Tahiti United (French Polynesia)	1–0	Vanuatu United
South Melbourne (Australia)	1–2	(Papua New Guinea) PNG Hekari
Bula FC (Fiji)	2–1	(New Zealand) Auckland FC

== Matches ==
The fixtures were announced on 23 November 2025.

=== Circuit 1 ===
17 January 2026
15:00 (NZDT)

Vanuatu United	2–2	(Fiji) Bula FC
Saniel 21'; Cardona 90+6'	(Report) (OFC)	Krishna 31'; Begg 70'

Eden Park, Auckland
Attendance: 3,701
Referee: Campbell-Kirk Kawana-Waugh (New Zealand)
17 January 2026
19:00 (NZDT)

Auckland FC (New Zealand)	3–0	(New Zealand) South Island United
Faulds 30'; Ferguson 83'; Gillion 88' (pen.)	(Report) (OFC)

Eden Park, Auckland
Attendance: 5,910
Referee: Ben Aukwai (Solomon Islands)
18 January 2026
13:00 (NZDT)

Tahiti United (French Polynesia)	1–2	(Australia) South Melbourne
Shan 36'	(Report) (OFC)	Uchida 47'; Mesourouni 90+8'

Eden Park, Auckland
Attendance: 565
Referee: Calvin Berg (New Zealand)
18 January 2026
17:00 (NZDT)

PNG Hekari (Papua New Guinea)	0–1	(Solomon Islands) Solomon Kings
	(Report) (OFC)	Higashide 59'

Eden Park, Auckland
Attendance: 780
Referee: Veer Singh (Fiji)

20 January 2026
19:00 (NZDT)

Auckland FC (New Zealand)	3–1	Vanuatu United
Vicelich 8'; Tade 20' (pen.); Ellis 69'	(Report) (OFC)	Tasip 51'

North Harbour Stadium, Albany
Attendance: 761
Referee: Mederic Lacour (New Caledonia)
3 March 2026 (Note: Originally scheduled to be played in January at North Harbour Stadium, Albany but was postponed due to adverse weather.)
15:00 (AEDT)

Tahiti United (French Polynesia)	2–1	(Papua New Guinea) PNG Hekari
Degrumelle 16'; Shan 47'	(Report) (OFC)	J. Joe 53'

Home of the Matildas, Melbourne
Attendance: 220
Referee: Ben Aukwai (Solomon Islands)
3 March 2026
19:00 (AEDT)

Bula FC (Fiji)	0–0	(New Zealand) South Island United
	(Report) (OFC)

Home of the Matildas, Melbourne
Referee: David Yareboinen (Papua New Guinea)
4 March 2026
19:00 (AEDT)

South Melbourne (Australia)	5–0	(Solomon Islands) Solomon Kings
Uchida 34'; Mikkola 50'; Lampard 64'; Bonada 78'; Cocks 90+3'	(Report) (OFC)

Home of the Matildas, Melbourne
Attendance: 350
Referee: Anna-Marie Keighley (New Zealand)

23 January 2026
15:00 (NZDT)

South Island United (New Zealand)	2–1	Vanuatu United
Feutz 4'; Zeb 9'	(Report) (OFC)	Saniel 67'

North Harbour Stadium, Albany
Attendance: 427
Referee: David Yareboinen (Papua New Guinea)
23 January 2026
19:00 (NZDT)

Auckland FC (New Zealand)	1–0	(Fiji) Bula FC
Normann 12'	(Report) (OFC)

North Harbour Stadium, Albany
Attendance: 1,973
Referee: Ben Aukwai (Solomon Islands)
24 January 2026
14:30 (NZDT)

Solomon Kings (Solomon Islands)	0−0	(French Polynesia) Tahiti United
	(Report) (OFC)

North Harbour Stadium, Albany
Attendance: 202
Referee: Cory Mills (New Zealand)
24 January 2026
18:30 (NZDT)

PNG Hekari (Papua New Guinea)	0−5	(Australia) South Melbourne
	(Report) (OFC)	Giannakopoulos 3'; Swibel 7', 57'; Mikkola 45'; Bonada 87'

North Harbour Stadium, Albany
Attendance: 355
Referee: Anna-Marie Keighley (New Zealand)

=== Circuit 2 ===
31 January 2026
11:30 (PGT)

Vanuatu United	2–2	(French Polynesia) Tahiti United
Smith 38' (pen.); Cardona 58'	(Report) (OFC)	Haewegene 27'; Tehau 56'

PNG Football Stadium, Port Moresby
Attendance: 368
Referee: Cory Mills (New Zealand)
31 January 2026
15:30 (PGT)

PNG Hekari (Papua New Guinea)	0–2	(New Zealand) Auckland FC
	(Report) (OFC)	Ferguson 90+2'; Tade 90+10' (pen.)

PNG Football Stadium, Port Moresby
Attendance: 1,500
Referee: Jose Cabero (Chile)
1 February 2026
11:30 (PGT)

South Island United (New Zealand)	3–3	(Australia) South Melbourne
Zeb 9'; Yoo 51'; Rodwell 55'	(Report) (OFC)	Uchida 18'; Mikkola 45' (pen.); Swibel 69'

PNG Football Stadium, Port Moresby
Attendance: 155
Referee: Ben Aukwai (Solomon Islands)
1 February 2026
15:30 (PGT)

Bula FC (Fiji)	1–0	(Solomon Islands) Solomon Kings
Begg 44'	(Report) (OFC)

PNG Football Stadium, Port Moresby
Attendance: 550
Referee: David Yareboinen (Papua New Guinea)

3 February 2026
11:30 (PGT)

Tahiti United (French Polynesia)	0–4	(New Zealand) Auckland FC
	(Report) (OFC)	Donkers 3'; Bayliss 50'; Burns 51'; Ferguson 63'

PNG Football Stadium, Port Moresby
Attendance: 254
Referee: Veer Singh (Fiji)
3 February 2026
15:30 (PGT)

PNG Hekari (Papua New Guinea)	2–2	Vanuatu United
J. Joe 33' (pen.); E. Joe 57'	(Report) (OFC)	Kaltack 11'; Smith 90+14' (pen.)

PNG Football Stadium, Port Moresby
Attendance: 900
Referee: Ben Aukwai (Solomon Islands)
4 February 2026
11:30 (PGT)

Solomon Kings (Solomon Islands)	0–0	(New Zealand) South Island United
	(Report) (OFC)

PNG Football Stadium, Port Moresby
Attendance: 156
Referee: Jose Cabero (Chile)
4 February 2026
15:30 (PGT)

Bula FC (Fiji)	1–1	(Australia) South Melbourne
Wasasala 42'	(Report) (OFC)	Mesourouni 13'

PNG Football Stadium, Port Moresby
Attendance: 200
Referee: Calvin Berg (New Zealand)

7 February 2026
11:30 (PGT)

Auckland FC (New Zealand)	1–3	(Solomon Islands) Solomon Kings
Gillion 87'	(Report) (OFC)	Higashide 41' (pen.); Leslie 45+1'; Lofthouse 55'

PNG Football Stadium, Port Moresby
Attendance: 515
Referee: David Yareboinen (Papua New Guinea)
7 February 2026
15:30 (PGT)

PNG Hekari (Papua New Guinea)	1–2	(New Zealand) South Island United
Orobulu 47'	(Report) (OFC)	Feutz 36' (pen.); Boyers 90+7'

PNG Football Stadium, Port Moresby
Attendance: 1,400
Referee: Veer Singh (Fiji)
8 February 2026
11:30 (PGT)

South Melbourne (Australia)	5–2	Vanuatu United
Inglese 23'; Uchida 45+6'; Swibel 64' (pen.), 83'; Mesourouni 90+8'	(Report) (OFC)	Saniel 1', 71'

PNG Football Stadium, Port Moresby
Attendance: 448
Referee: Cory Mills (New Zealand)
8 February 2026
15:30 (PGT)

Tahiti United (French Polynesia)	1–0	(Fiji) Bula FC
Tehau 69' (pen.)	(Report) (OFC)

PNG Football Stadium, Port Moresby
Attendance: 750
Referee: Calvin Berg (New Zealand)

=== Circuit 3 ===
21 February 2026
13:00 (AEDT)

Tahiti United (French Polynesia)	2–2	(New Zealand) South Island United
Haewegene 18'; Tehau 65'	(Report) (OFC)	Feutz 48', 86'

Olympic Village, Melbourne
Attendance: 75
Referee: Veer Singh (Fiji)
21 February 2026
19:00 (AEDT)

South Melbourne (Australia)	1–1	(New Zealand) Auckland FC
Eliopoulos 90+6'	(Report) (OFC)	Gillion 89'

Olympic Village, Melbourne
Attendance: 400
Referee: Calvin Berg (New Zealand)
22 February 2026
13:00 (AEDT)

Bula FC (Fiji)	0–2	Vanuatu United
	(Report) (OFC)	Saniel 43'; Iamak 57'

Olympic Village, Melbourne
Attendance: 800
Referee: Anna-Marie Keighley (New Zealand)
22 February 2026
19:00 (AEDT)

Solomon Kings (Solomon Islands)	2–1	(Papua New Guinea) PNG Hekari
Higashide 13'; David 50'	(Report) (OFC)	J. Joe 77'

Olympic Village, Melbourne
Attendance: 300
Referee: Kavitesh Behari (Fiji)

25 February 2026
15:00 (AEDT)

Vanuatu United	2–0	(Solomon Islands) Solomon Kings
Cardona 29'; Kaltack 53'	(Report) (OFC)

Home of the Matildas, Melbourne
Attendance: 300
Referee: Calvin Berg (New Zealand)
25 February 2026
19:00 (AEDT)

PNG Hekari (Papua New Guinea)	1–2	(Fiji) Bula FC
Kepo 38'	(Report) (OFC)	Dunn 11'; Auvray 36'

Home of the Matildas, Melbourne
Attendance: 450
Referee: Cory Mills (New Zealand)
21 April 2026 (Note: Originally scheduled to be played in February, but was postponed due to severe thunderstorms and heavy rain.)
15:00 (FJT)

South Island United (New Zealand)	1–3	(New Zealand) Auckland FC
Yoo 76'	(Report) (OFC)	Faulds 28'; Van Dijk 59' (o.g.); Prins 81'

Govind Park, Ba
Attendance: 117
Referee: Anna-Marie Keighley (New Zealand)
21 April 2026
19:00 (FJT)

South Melbourne (Australia)	8–1	(French Polynesia) Tahiti United
Lackay 4'; Swibel 14'; Cocks 26', 45+4'; Giannakopoulos 34'; Mesourouni 36'; Singh 69'; Burchmore 71'	(Report) (OFC)	Haewegene 62'

Govind Park, Ba
Attendance: 124
Referee: Kavitesh Behari (Fiji)

27 February 2026
15:00 (AEDT)

Auckland FC (New Zealand)	1–0	(French Polynesia) Tahiti United
Ellis 62'	(Report) (OFC)

Home of the Matildas, Melbourne
Attendance: 150
Referee: Ben Aukwai (Solomon Islands)
27 February 2026
19:00 (AEDT)

South Melbourne (Australia)	4–1	(New Zealand) South Island United
Uchida 25'; Janković 33'; Lackay 73'; Swibel 87'	(Report) (OFC)	Giannakopoulos 21' (o.g.)

Home of the Matildas, Melbourne
Attendance: 400
Referee: David Yareboinen (Papua New Guinea)
28 February 2026
14:30 (AEDT)

Vanuatu United	1–3	(Papua New Guinea) PNG Hekari
Kaltack 30'	(Report) (OFC)	Ramazani 33' (o.g.); Naime 51'; Gunemba 90+2'

Home of the Matildas, Melbourne
Attendance: 650
Referee: Calvin Berg (New Zealand)
28 February 2026
18:30 (AEDT)

Solomon Kings (Solomon Islands)	2–0	(Fiji) Bula FC
Lofthouse 19'; Higashide 76' (pen.)	(Report) (OFC)

Home of the Matildas, Melbourne
Attendance: 350
Referee: Mederic Lacour (New Caledonia)

=== Circuit 4 ===
14 March 2026
15:00 (SBT)

South Island United (New Zealand)	4–1	(Papua New Guinea) PNG Hekari
Boyers 16', 65', 80'; Gonerau 26' (o.g.)	(Report) (OFC)	Naime 4'

National Stadium, Honiara
Attendance: 4,500
Referee: Cory Mills (New Zealand)
14 March 2026
19:30 (SBT)

Solomon Kings (Solomon Islands)	0–1	(New Zealand) Auckland FC
	(Report) (OFC)	Burns 87'

National Stadium, Honiara
Attendance: 6,700
Referee: David Yareboinen (Papua New Guinea)
15 March 2026
15:00 (SBT)

Vanuatu United	2–0	(Australia) South Melbourne
Saniel 32'; Ingham 79'	(Report) (OFC)

National Stadium, Honiara
Attendance: 1,850
Referee: Ben Aukwai (Solomon Islands)
15 March 2026
19:00 (SBT)

Bula FC (Fiji)	2–0	(French Polynesia) Tahiti United
Hughes 71', 76'	(Report) (OFC)

National Stadium, Honiara
Attendance: 3,450
Referee: Calvin Berg (New Zealand)

18 March 2026
15:00 (SBT)

Vanuatu United	0–0	(New Zealand) Auckland FC
	(Report) (OFC)

National Stadium, Honiara
Attendance: 1,900
Referee: Ben Aukwai (Solomon Islands)
18 March 2026
19:00 (SBT)

PNG Hekari (Papua New Guinea)	2–2	(French Polynesia) Tahiti United
J. Joe 22'; Naime 86'	(Report) (OFC)	Shan 45+5'; Tehau 90+16' (pen.)

National Stadium, Honiara
Attendance: 3,250
Referee: Calvin Berg (New Zealand)
19 March 2026
15:00 (SBT)

South Island United (New Zealand)	2–3	(Fiji) Bula FC
Yoo 16'; Boyers 26'	(Report) (OFC)	Dunn 56'; Krishna 90+1' (pen.); Wara 90+11'

National Stadium, Honiara
Attendance: 3,012
Referee: Cory Mills (New Zealand)
19 March 2026
19:00 (SBT)

Solomon Kings (Solomon Islands)	1–1	(Australia) South Melbourne
Wae 45+3'	(Report) (OFC)	Leech 90+6'

National Stadium, Honiara
Attendance: 9,005
Referee: David Yareboinen (Papua New Guinea)

=== Circuit 5 ===
11 April 2026
15:00 (FJT)

Vanuatu United	1–2	(New Zealand) South Island United
Soromon 50'	(Report) (OFC)	Feutz 90+4'; McLeod 90+8'

HFC Bank Stadium, Suva
Attendance: 585
Referee: Kavitesh Behari (Fiji)
11 April 2026
19:00 (FJT)

Tahiti United (French Polynesia)	5–1	(Solomon Islands) Solomon Kings
Waranaivalu 41'; Haewegene 46', 58', 74'; Athale 70'	(Report) (OFC)	Lofthouse 27'

HFC Bank Stadium, Suva
Attendance: 1,542
Referee: Veer Singh (Fiji)
12 April 2026
15:00 (FJT)

Auckland FC (New Zealand)	3–2	(Australia) South Melbourne
Robinson 1'; Normann 59'; Wynne 84'	(Report) (OFC)	Mesourouni 10'; Leech 23'

Govind Park, Ba
Attendance: 650
Referee: Calvin Berg (New Zealand)
12 April 2026
19:00 (FJT)

Bula FC (Fiji)	1–0	(Papua New Guinea) PNG Hekari
Supyk 63'	(Report) (OFC)

Govind Park, Ba
Attendance: 1,853
Referee: Campbell-Kirk Kawana-Waugh (New Zealand)

14 April 2026
15:00 (FJT)

South Island United (New Zealand)	3–3	(French Polynesia) Tahiti United
Yoo 43'; Feutz 57', 67' (pen.)	(Report) (OFC)	Tehau 53', 90+1'; Papaura 90+6'

HFC Bank Stadium, Suva
Attendance: 188
Referee: Kavitesh Behari (Fiji)
14 April 2026
19:00 (FJT)

Solomon Kings (Solomon Islands)	3–2	Vanuatu United
Iro 22'; Wae 52'; Higashide 90+7' (pen.)	(Report) (OFC)	Saniel 16'; Smith 34' (pen.)

HFC Bank Stadium, Suva
Attendance: 1,204
Referee: Cory Mills (New Zealand)
15 April 2026
15:00 (FJT)

Auckland FC (New Zealand)	2–0	(Papua New Guinea) PNG Hekari
Faulds 42'; Gillion 49'	(Report) (OFC)

Govind Park, Ba
Attendance: 237
Referee: Ben Aukwai (Solomon Islands)
15 April 2026
19:00 (FJT)

South Melbourne (Australia)	2–0	(Fiji) Bula FC
Uchida 21'; Mikkola 30'	(Report) (OFC)

Govind Park, Ba
Attendance: 1,173
Referee: Campbell-Kirk Kawana-Waugh (New Zealand)

17 April 2026
15:00 (FJT)

South Island United (New Zealand)	2–1	(Solomon Islands) Solomon Kings
Gray 69'; Boyers 81'	(Report) (OFC)	Lofthouse 23'

HFC Bank Stadium, Suva
Attendance: 643
Referee: Veer Singh (Fiji)
17 April 2026
19:00 (FJT)

Tahiti United (French Polynesia)	1–0	Vanuatu United
Athale 45+4'	(Report) (OFC)

HFC Bank Stadium, Suva
Attendance: 1,106
Referee: Anna-Marie Keighley (New Zealand)
18 April 2026
15:00 (FJT)

South Melbourne (Australia)	1–2	(Papua New Guinea) PNG Hekari
Janković 58'	(Report) (OFC)	Gonerau 7'; Kepo 90+1'

Govind Park, Ba
Attendance: 325
Referee: Mederic Lacour (New Caledonia)
18 April 2026
19:00 (FJT)

Bula FC (Fiji)	2–1	(New Zealand) Auckland FC
Vasconcellos 14'; Krishna 35'	(Report) (OFC)	Tade 45+5'

Govind Park, Ba
Attendance: 1,157
Referee: Campbell-Kirk Kawana-Waugh (New Zealand)
