= South Island United FC league record by opponent =

South Island United FC is a New Zealand professional association football club based at United Sports Centre in Christchurch, New Zealand. The club was formed in 2025, making them the first South Island based professional team. They are also the third New Zealand current professional side in New Zealand after Auckland FC and Wellington Phoenix.

South Island United's first team compete in the OFC Professional League. Their record against each club faced are listed below. South Island United FC's first match was against Auckland FC.

== All-time record ==
Statistics correct as of match played on 20 May 2026.

Colour key

Positive balance (more wins in total matches)
Neutral balance (equal W/L ratio in total matches)
Negative balance (more losses in total matches)

Key

- The table includes results of matches played by South Island United FC in the OFC Professional League.
- **Bolded** clubs competed in the 2026 OFC Professional League alongside South Island United.
- P = matches played; W = matches won; D = matches drawn; L = matches lost; GF = goals for; GA = goals against; GD = goal difference; Win% = percentage of matches won.
- The columns headed "First" and "Last" contain the first and most recent seasons in which South Island United FC played matches against each opponent.

South Island United FC league record by opponent
Club	Total								First	Last
Club	P	W	D	L	GF	GA	GD	Win%	First	Last
**Auckland FC**	4	0	0	4	3	12	−9	0.00	2026	2026
**Bula FC**	3	1	1	1	3	3	+0	33.33	2026	2026
**PNG Hekari**	2	2	0	0	6	2	+4	100.00	2026	2026
**Solomon Kings**	2	1	1	0	2	1	+1	50.00	2026	2026
**South Melbourne**	3	0	1	2	6	11	−5	0.00	2026	2026
**Tahiti United**	2	0	2	0	5	5	+0	0.00	2026	2026
**Vanuatu United**	2	2	0	0	4	2	+2	100.00	2026	2026
Total	**18**	**6**	**5**	**7**	**29**	**36**	**−7**	**33.33**	2026	2026

== OFC Professional League results ==
Season	Round	Club		Home	Away	Position
2026	Circuit series	(New Zealand)	Auckland FC	1–3	0–3	4th
2026	Circuit series	(Fiji)	Bula FC	2–3	0–0	4th
2026	Circuit series	(Vanuatu)	Vanuatu United	2–1	2–1	4th
2026	Circuit series	(Australia)	South Melbourne	3–3	1–4	4th
2026	Circuit series	(Solomon Islands)	Solomon Kings	2–1	0–0	4th
2026	Circuit series	(Papua New Guinea)	PNG Hekari	4–1	2–1	4th
2026	Circuit series	(French Polynesia)	Tahiti United	3–3	2–2	4th
2026	Leaders group	(New Zealand)	Auckland FC	2–5		3rd
2026	Leaders group	(Fiji)	Bula FC	1–0		3rd
2026	Leaders group	(Australia)	South Melbourne	2–4		3rd
2026	Semi-finals	(New Zealand)	Auckland FC	0–1		
