= 2026 OFC Professional League final =

Football match in Auckland, New Zealand

- Event: 2026 OFC Professional League
South Melbourne	Auckland FC
(Australia)	(New Zealand)
1	2
- Date: 24 May 2026
- Venue: Eden Park, Auckland
- Man of the Match: Daniel Normann (Auckland FC)
- Referee: Campbell-Kirk Kawana-Waugh (New Zealand)
- Attendance: 3,470
- Weather: Fair; 16 °C (61 °F); 77% humidity

The 2026 OFC Professional League final was the final match of the 2026 OFC Professional League, the inaugural season of Oceania's premier club football tournament organised by Oceania Football Confederation. It was played at the Eden Park in Auckland, New Zealand, on 24 May 2026 between Australian club South Melbourne, and New Zealand club Auckland FC.

As South Melbourne were not eligible to represent OFC in world competitions (as Australia are no longer part of OFC), Auckland FC qualified to compete in the 2026 FIFA Intercontinental Cup before the dinal.

Auckland FC won the match 2–1 and were crowned the first OFC Pro League champions.

== Background ==
South Melbourne reached their second continental final, having won the 1999 OFC Club Championship, beating Nadi in the final.

This was Auckland FC's first continental final, competing in an Oceanian competition for the first time.

== Venue ==
It was announced on 16 April 2026, that Eden Park in Auckland, New Zealand would host the final.

== Route to the final ==
Note: In all results below, the score of the finalist is given first (H: home; A: away — As all games were played in centralised locations, home and away was for administration purposes only).

(Australia) South Melbourne		Round	(New Zealand) Auckland FC	
Opponent	Result	Circuit series	Opponent	Result
(French Polynesia) Tahiti United	2–1 (A)	Matchday 1	(New Zealand) South Island United	3–0 (H)
(Solomon Islands) Solomon Kings	5–0 (H)	Matchday 2	Vanuatu United	3–1 (H)
(Papua New Guinea) PNG Hekari	5–0 (A)	Matchday 3	(Fiji) Bula FC	1–0 (H)
(New Zealand) South Island United	3–3 (A)	Matchday 4	(Papua New Guinea) PNG Hekari	2–0 (A)
(Fiji) Bula FC	1–1 (A)	Matchday 5	(French Polynesia) Tahiti United	4–0 (A)
Vanuatu United	5–2 (H)	Matchday 6	(Solomon Islands) Solomon Kings	1–3 (H)
(New Zealand) Auckland FC	1–1 (H)	Matchday 7	(Australia) South Melbourne	1–1 (A)
(French Polynesia) Tahiti United	8–1 (H)	Matchday 8	(New Zealand) South Island United	3–1 (A)
(New Zealand) South Island United	4–1 (H)	Matchday 9	(French Polynesia) Tahiti United	1–0 (H)
Vanuatu United	0–2 (A)	Matchday 10	(Solomon Islands) Solomon Kings	1–0 (A)
(Solomon Islands) Solomon Kings	1–1 (A)	Matchday 11	Vanuatu United	0–0 (A)
(New Zealand) Auckland FC	2–3 (A)	Matchday 12	(Australia) South Melbourne	3–2 (H)
(Fiji) Bula FC	2–0 (H)	Matchday 13	(Papua New Guinea) PNG Hekari	2–0 (H)
(Papua New Guinea) PNG Hekari	1–2 (H)	Matchday 14	(Fiji) Bula FC	1–2 (A)
Circuit series runner-ups: Pos / Team / Pld / Pts; 1 / (New Zealand) Auckland FC / 14 / 32; 2 / (Australia) South Melbourne / 14 / 25; 3 / (Fiji) Bula FC / 14 / 21; 4 / (New Zealand) South Island United / 14 / 20; 5 / (Solomon Islands) Solomon Kings / 14 / 18; Source: OFC Pro League		Final standings	Circuit series winners: Pos / Team / Pld / Pts; 1 / (New Zealand) Auckland FC / 14 / 32; 2 / (Australia) South Melbourne / 14 / 25; 3 / (Fiji) Bula FC / 14 / 21; 4 / (New Zealand) South Island United / 14 / 20; 5 / (Solomon Islands) Solomon Kings / 14 / 18; Source: OFC Pro League	
Opponent	Result	Leaders group	Opponent	Result
(New Zealand) Auckland FC	2–1 (A)	Matchday 1	(Australia) South Melbourne	1–2 (H)
(New Zealand) South Island United	4–2 (H)	Matchday 2	(Fiji) Bula FC	2–0 (H)
(Fiji) Bula FC	4–2 (H)	Matchday 3	(New Zealand) South Island United	5–2 (H)
Leaders group winners: Pos / Team / Pld / Pts; 1 / (Australia) South Melbourne / 3 / 9; 2 / (New Zealand) Auckland FC / 3 / 6; 3 / (New Zealand) South Island United / 3 / 3; 4 / (Fiji) Bula FC / 3 / 0; Source: OFC Pro League		Final standings	Leaders group runner-ups: Pos / Team / Pld / Pts; 1 / (Australia) South Melbourne / 3 / 9; 2 / (New Zealand) Auckland FC / 3 / 6; 3 / (New Zealand) South Island United / 3 / 3; 4 / (Fiji) Bula FC / 3 / 0; Source: OFC Pro League	
Opponent	Result	Knockout stage	Opponent	Result
Bye		Play-offs	Bye	
Vanuatu United	4–0 (H)	Semi-finals	(New Zealand) South Island United	1–0 (H)

== Match ==
=== Details ===
The "home" team (for administrative purposes) was predetermined as the winners of semi-final 1 (South Melbourne).

24 May 2026
15:00 UTC+12

South Melbourne (Australia)	1–2	(New Zealand) Auckland FC
Uchida 90+7'	(OFC) (Report)	Normann 23'; Ellis 72'

Eden Park, Auckland
Attendance: 3,470
Referee: Campbell-Kirk Kawana-Waugh (New Zealand)

South Melbourne	Auckland FC

GK	1	(Spain) Javier López
RB	27	(Australia) Jack Painter-Andrews		(substituted off) 80'
CB	23	(Australia) Jacob Eliopoulos		(substituted off) 33'
CB	4	(Australia) Marko Janković (c)
LB	3	(Australia) Jordon Lampard
RM	22	(Australia) Max Mikkola	(yellow card) 21'	(substituted off) 74'
CM	21	(Australia) Sebastian Pasquali
CM	17	(Australia) Thomas Giannakopoulos
LM	10	(Argentina) Nahuel Bonada		(substituted off) 46'
CF	11	(Japan) Yuki Uchida
CF	9	(Australia) Jordan Swibel		(substituted off) 74'
Substitutes:
GK	20	(Australia) Jake Charlston
GK	30	(Australia) Iliya Shalamanov-Trenkov
DF	2	(Australia) Lucas Inglese	(yellow card) 35'	(substituted on) 33'
DF	8	(New Zealand) Luka Coveny
MF	14	(Australia) Alex Menelaou
MF	19	(Australia) Andrew Mesourouni		(substituted on) 74'
MF	31	(Australia) Ethan O’Sullivan
MW	88	(Australia) Charlie Leech
MW	99	(Australia) Jack Pope		(substituted on) 80'
FW	7	(New Zealand) Ishveer Singh
FW	13	(Australia) James Lackay		(substituted on) 74'
FW	16	(Australia) Arran Cocks		(substituted on) 46'
Manager:
(Australia) Siniša Cohadzić

GK	1	(New Zealand) Oscar Mason
RB	24	(New Zealand) Zac Zoricich
CB	23	(New Zealand) Ronan Wynne
CB	3	(Australia) Tass Mourdoukoutas (c)
LB	7	(United States) Jonathan Robinson
RM	12	(New Zealand) Isa Prins	(substituted off) 62'
CM	6	(Norway) Daniel Normann
CM	5	(New Zealand) Michael den Heijer	(substituted off) 89'
LM	8	(Australia) James Bayliss
CF	17	(New Zealand) Reid Drake	(substituted off) 73'
CF	35	(New Zealand) Jonty Bidois	(substituted off) 62'
Substitutes:
GK	40	(New Zealand) Blake Callinan
GK	50	(New Zealand) Eli Jones
DF	16	(New Zealand) Adama Coulibaly
DF	32	(New Zealand) Everton O'Leary	(substituted on) 89'
FW	11	(New Zealand) Oscar Faulds
FW	20	(Argentina) Emiliano Tade	(substituted on) 73'
FW	21	(New Zealand) Matt Ellis	(substituted on) 62'
FW	28	(Australia) Bailey Ferguson
FW	29	(New Zealand) Kian Donkers
FW	41	(New Zealand) Aston Burns	(substituted on) 62'
Manager:
(Australia) Luke Casserly

Man of the Match:
Daniel Normann (Auckland FC)
Assistant referees:
Isaac Trevis (New Zealand)
Malaetala Salanoa (Samoa)
Fourth official:
Veer Singh (Fiji)
Fifth official:
Jeremy Garae (Vanuatu)
Video assistant referee:
Calvin Berg (New Zealand)
Assistant video assistant referee:
Beth Rattray (New Zealand)
Support video assistant referee:
Edward Cook (New Zealand)

Match rules

- 90 minutes
- 30 minutes of extra time if necessary
- Penalty shoot-out if scores still level
- Maximum of twelve named substitutes
- Maximum of five substitutions, with a sixth allowed in extra time
- Maximum of three substitution opportunities, with a fourth allowed in extra time

== See also ==
- 2026 Auckland FC (OFC Professional League) season
- 2026 South Melbourne FC season
