= 2026 OFC Professional League challengers play-off group =

International football club competition in Oceania

The 2026 OFC Professional League challengers play-off group was played from 7 to 13 May 2026.

== League table ==
Pos	Team	Pld	W	D	L	GF	GA	GD	Pts	Qualification
1	Vanuatu United	3	2	1	0	8	5	+3	7	Qualification for qualification play-off
2	(Solomon Islands) Solomon Kings	3	2	0	1	7	4	+3	6	
3	(French Polynesia) Tahiti United	3	0	2	1	5	6	−1	2	
4	(Papua New Guinea) PNG Hekari	3	0	1	2	3	8	−5	1	

Source: OFC Pro League
Rules for classification: 1) Points; 2) Goal difference; 3) Goals scored; 4) Head to head; 5) Head to head goal difference; 6) Head to head goals scored; 7) Disciplinary record; 8) Coin toss

== Results ==
Home team	Score	Away team
Solomon Kings (Solomon Islands)	2–1	(French Polynesia) Tahiti United
Vanuatu United	3–1	(Papua New Guinea) PNG Hekari
Solomon Kings (Solomon Islands)	2–3	Vanuatu United
Tahiti United (French Polynesia)	2–2	(Papua New Guinea) PNG Hekari
Solomon Kings (Solomon Islands)	3–0	(Papua New Guinea) PNG Hekari
Tahiti United (French Polynesia)	2–2	Vanuatu United

== Matches ==
The fixtures were announced on 22 April 2026.

7 May 2026
15:00 (NZDT)

Solomon Kings (Solomon Islands)	2–1	(French Polynesia) Tahiti United
Heitaa 46' (o.g.); Lofthouse 83'	(OFC) (Report)	Ruiz 84'

Eden Park, Auckland
Attendance: 205
Referee: Calvin Berg (New Zealand)
7 May 2026
19:00 (NZDT)

Vanuatu United	3–1	(Papua New Guinea) PNG Hekari
Diho 29'; Saniel 75', 87'	(OFC) (Report)	Kepo 37'

Eden Park, Auckland
Attendance: 296
Referee: Anna-Marie Keighley (New Zealand)

10 May 2026
13:00 (NZDT)

Solomon Kings (Solomon Islands)	2–3	Vanuatu United
Higashide 62'; Wae 86'	(OFC) (Report)	Ingham 34'; Saniel 76'; Wae 83' (o.g.)

Mount Smart Stadium, Auckland
Attendance: 296
Referee: Mederic Lacour (New Caledonia)
10 May 2026
17:00 (NZDT)

Tahiti United (French Polynesia)	2–2	(Papua New Guinea) PNG Hekari
Waranaivalu 45+3'; Athale 88'	(OFC) (Report)	Gabriel 15'; Gonerau 87'

Mount Smart Stadium, Auckland
Attendance: 152
Referee: Ben Aukwai (Solomon Islands)

13 May 2026
15:00 (NZDT)

Solomon Kings (Solomon Islands)	3–0	(Papua New Guinea) PNG Hekari
Leslie 10'; Lofthouse 22', 90+1'	(OFC) (Report)

Mount Smart Stadium, Auckland
Attendance: 126
Referee: Campbell-Kirk Kawana-Waugh (New Zealand)
13 May 2026
19:00 (NZDT)

Tahiti United (French Polynesia)	2–2	Vanuatu United
Tehau 59' (pen.); Barbe 73'	(OFC) (Report)	Smith 22'; Saniel 61'

Mount Smart Stadium, Auckland
Attendance: 211
Referee: Veer Singh (Fiji)
