= 2026 MSG Prime Minister's Cup – Men's football team squads =

Below are the final squads for participating nations in the 2026 MSG Prime Minister's Cup to be held in Fiji from 18 September to 3 October 2026.

== Fiji ==
Head coach: (Guadeloupe) Stéphane Auvray

| No. | Pos. | Player | Date of birth (age) | Caps | Goals | Club |
|---|---|---|---|---|---|---|
| 1 | GK | Isikeli Sevanaia Jr | 11 January 2003 (aged 23) | 9 | 0 | (Fiji Football Association) Ba |
| 2 | DF | Scott Wara | 22 September 1999 (aged 26) | 8 | 0 | (Football Australia) Maitland FC |
| 3 | DF | Jone Lalagavesi | 15 March 2004 (aged 22) | 0 | 0 | (Fiji Football Association) Labasa |
| 4 | DF | Lekima Gonerau | 8 December 1989 (aged 36) | 9 | 0 | (Fiji Football Association) Labasa |
| 5 | DF | Ilisoni Lolaivalu | 28 November 1993 (aged 32) | 5 | 0 | (Fiji Football Association) Ba |
| 6 | MF | Thomas Dunn | 19 January 2003 (aged 23) | 25 | 7 | (Fiji Football Association) Navua |
| 7 | FW | Faazil Ali | 8 May 2003 (aged 23) | 0 | 0 | (Fiji Football Association) Ba |
| 8 | DF | Filipe Baravilala | 25 November 1994 (aged 31) | 19 | 1 | (Fiji Football Association) Navua |
| 9 | FW | Roy Krishna | 30 August 1987 (aged 39) | 63 | 45 | (Fiji Football Association) Bula FC |
| 10 | MF | Maikah Dau | 29 April 2009 (aged 17) | 2 | 0 | (Fiji Football Association) Nasinu |
| 11 | FW | Zacariah Harang | 11 August 2006 (aged 20) | 1 | 0 | (Football Australia) Wollongong Wolves |
| 12 | MF | Tevita Waranaivalu | 16 September 1995 (aged 31) | 33 | 3 | (Fiji Football Association) Rewa |
| 13 | DF | Isimeli Gavidi | 29 January 2006 (aged 20) | 0 | 0 | (Fiji Football Association) Ba |
| 14 | MF | Sitiveni Cavuilagi | 26 July 1994 (aged 32) | 17 | 1 | (Fiji Football Association) Lautoka |
| 15 | MF | Ryan Naresh | 12 May 2007 (aged 19) | 0 | 0 | (Fiji Football Association) Ba |
| 16 | DF | Gabriele Matanisiga | 14 June 1995 (aged 31) | 25 | 2 | (Fiji Football Association) Rewa |
| 17 | DF | Sterling Vasconcellos | 19 April 2005 (aged 21) | 17 | 0 | (Fiji Football Association) Lautoka |
| 18 | MF | Abdullah Khairati | 7 July 2008 (aged 18) | 0 | 0 | (Canadian Soccer Association) Supra Academy |
| 19 | MF | Nabil Begg | 17 March 2004 (aged 22) | 15 | 4 | (Fiji Football Association) Ba |
| 20 | GK | Joela Biuvanua | 4 September 1998 (aged 28) | 0 | 0 | (Fiji Football Association) Nadi |

== New Caledonia ==
Head coach: (French Polynesia) Félix Tagawa

| No. | Pos. | Player | Date of birth (age) | Caps | Goals | Club |
|---|---|---|---|---|---|---|
| 1 | GK | Mickaël Ulile | 16 July 1997 (aged 29) | 15 | 0 | (New Caledonian Football Federation) ASC Gaïca |
| 2 | MF | Aymard Tidjite | | 0 | 0 | (New Caledonian Football Federation) Hienghène Sport |
| 3 | DF | Fabrice Iopue | 3 March 2008 (aged 18) | 0 | 0 | (New Caledonian Football Federation) AS Magenta |
| 4 | DF | Timotei Zeter | 12 December 2006 (aged 19) | 0 | 0 | (New Caledonian Football Federation) Hienghène Sport |
| 5 | DF | Neil Wahiobe | 12 June 2000 (aged 26) | 0 | 0 | (New Caledonian Football Federation) ASC Gaïca |
| 6 | MF | Kandjo Teanyouen | 25 June 2005 (aged 21) | 0 | 0 | (New Caledonian Football Federation) FC Bélep |
| 7 | FW | Stéphane Wahaga | 21 June 1991 (aged 35) | 0 | 0 | (New Caledonian Football Federation) Hienghène Sport |
| 8 | DF | Gregory Diko | 25 February 2007 (aged 19) | 0 | 0 | (New Caledonian Football Federation) SC Ne Drehu |
| 9 | FW | Willy Read | 11 January 2003 (aged 23) | 6 | 1 | (New Caledonian Football Federation) Tiga Sport |
| 10 | MF | Brice Dahite | 21 June 1991 (aged 35) | 11 | 1 | (New Caledonian Football Federation) Hienghène Sport |
| 11 | FW | Roan Thale | | 0 | 0 | (New Caledonian Football Federation) ASC Emo Biloup |
| 12 | MF | Djibril Tufele | 25 January 2003 (aged 23) | 2 | 0 | (New Caledonian Football Federation) AS Lössi |
| 13 | GK | Jean-Gilles Hnamuko | 2 March 1996 (aged 30) | 2 | 0 | (New Caledonian Football Federation) AS UNC |
| 14 | MF | Cédric Decoire | 15 May 1994 (aged 32) | 11 | 3 | (New Caledonian Football Federation) CA Saint-Louis |
| 15 | FW | Pierre Iékawé | 7 September 1997 (aged 29) | 1 | 0 | (New Caledonian Football Federation) Tiga Sport |
| 16 | GK | Jean-Pierre Wélépane | | 0 | 0 | (New Caledonian Football Federation) AS Magenta |
| 17 | MF | Jemmanuel Siwoine | 20 September 2008 (aged 17) | 0 | 0 | (New Caledonian Football Federation) AS Lössi |
| 18 | DF | Sipane Qaeze | 23 April 2007 (aged 19) | 0 | 0 | (New Caledonian Football Federation) ASC Gaïca |

== Papua New Guinea ==
Head coach: Bob Morris

| No. | Pos. | Player | Date of birth (age) | Caps | Goals | Club |
|---|---|---|---|---|---|---|
| 1 | GK | Dave Tomare | 26 April 1997 (aged 29) | 7 | 0 | (Papua New Guinea Football Association) PNG Hekari |
| 2 | DF | Daniel Joe | 29 May 1990 (aged 36) | 38 | 0 | (Papua New Guinea Football Association) PNG Hekari |
| 3 | DF | Ezekiel Vela | 1 February 2002 (aged 24) | 1 | 0 | (Papua New Guinea Football Association) Komara Gulf |
| 4 | DF | Bomecge Basananuc | 26 March 2011 (aged 15) | 0 | 0 | (Papua New Guinea Football Association) Lae City |
| 5 | DF | Langarap Samol | 21 July 1989 (aged 37) | 1 | 0 | (Papua New Guinea Football Association) Lae City |
| 6 | FW | Ati Kepo | 15 January 1996 (aged 30) | 26 | 8 | (Papua New Guinea Football Association) PNG Hekari |
| 8 | MF | Abraham Allen | 25 December 2000 (aged 25) | 2 | 0 | (Papua New Guinea Football Association) Port Moresby Strikers |
| 9 | FW | Oberth Simon | 1 January 2001 (aged 25) | 9 | 0 | (Papua New Guinea Football Association) Port Moresby Strikers |
| 10 | FW | Rex Naime | 23 October 2003 (aged 22) | 10 | 0 | (Fiji Football Association) Labasa |
| 11 | MF | Yagi Yasasa | 17 August 2000 (aged 26) | 17 | 0 | (Football Australia) Bendigo City |
| 12 | MF | Solomon Kamake | 24 April 2007 (aged 19) | 0 | 0 | (Papua New Guinea Football Association) Lae City |
| 13 | FW | Tommy Semmy | 30 September 1994 (aged 31) | 28 | 10 | (Papua New Guinea Football Association) PNG Hekari |
| 16 | MF | Solomon Rani | 22 May 2002 (aged 24) | 10 | 1 | (Papua New Guinea Football Association) PNG Hekari |
| 17 | DF | Dallas Namuesh | 5 July 1997 (aged 29) | 4 | 0 | (Papua New Guinea Football Association) Morobe Wawens |
| 18 | FW | Nalau Moses | 26 June 2007 (aged 19) | 0 | 0 | (Papua New Guinea Football Association) Lae City |
| 19 | MF | David Tita | 5 May 2008 (aged 18) | 0 | 0 | (Papua New Guinea Football Association) Lae City |
| 20 | GK | Ronald Warisan | 20 September 1989 (aged 36) | 39 | 0 | (Papua New Guinea Football Association) Lae City |
| 21 | MF | Hossain Kaio | 5 May 2008 (aged 18) | 0 | 0 | (Papua New Guinea Football Association) Port Moresby Strikers |
| 22 | GK | Jordan Tobem | 28 August 1997 (aged 29) | 0 | 0 | (Papua New Guinea Football Association) Morobe Wawens |
| 23 | MF | Henry Kurkur | 1 January 2003 (aged 23) | 0 | 0 | (Papua New Guinea Football Association) Morobe Wawens |

== Solomon Islands ==
Head coach: (Australia) Ben Cahn

| No. | Pos. | Player | Date of birth (age) | Caps | Goals | Club |
|---|---|---|---|---|---|---|
| 1 | GK | Philip Mango | 28 August 1995 (aged 31) | 44 | 0 | (Solomon Islands Football Federation) Kossa |
| 2 | DF | David Supa | 21 December 2000 (aged 25) | 19 | 0 | (Fiji Football Association) Ba |
| 4 | DF | Gordon Iro | 2 December 2005 (aged 20) | 2 | 0 | (Solomon Islands Football Federation) Green Shield |
| 5 | DF | Javin Wae | 17 November 2002 (aged 23) | 22 | 2 | (Solomon Islands Football Federation) Central Coast |
| 6 | MF | Atkin Kaua | 4 April 1996 (aged 30) | 45 | 5 | (Solomon Islands Football Federation) Malaita Kingz |
| 7 | FW | Raphael Lea'i | 9 September 2003 (aged 23) | 32 | 14 | (Solomon Islands Football Federation) Central Coast |
| 8 | DF | Clivert Sam | 1 August 2004 (aged 22) | 2 | 0 | (Solomon Islands Football Federation) Green Shield |
| 9 | FW | Bobby Leslie | 3 March 2000 (aged 26) | 15 | 2 | (Solomon Islands Football Federation) Central Coast |
| 10 | MF | Rovu Boyers | 19 April 2003 (aged 23) | 12 | 4 | (New Zealand Football) Christchurch United |
| 12 | GK | Junior Petua | 30 December 2003 (aged 22) | 0 | 0 | (Solomon Islands Football Federation) Marist |
| 13 | MF | Danford Fiumae | 29 May 2007 (aged 19) | 0 | 0 | (Solomon Islands Football Federation) Green Shield |
| 14 | DF | Junior David | 22 September 2001 (aged 24) | 2 | 0 | (Solomon Islands Football Federation) Central Coast |
| 15 | MF | William Komasi | 10 June 2000 (aged 26) | 24 | 1 | (Fiji Football Association) Navua |
| 16 | FW | Jayroll Patty | 5 June 2007 (aged 19) | 1 | 0 | (Solomon Islands Football Federation) Green Shield |
| 17 | MF | Don Keana | 9 September 2000 (aged 26) | 10 | 1 | (Fiji Football Association) Rewa |
| 18 | FW | Ali Mekawir | 27 July 2000 (aged 26) | 6 | 0 | (Fiji Football Association) Navua |
| 19 | FW | Junior Fordney | 26 November 1999 (aged 26) | 7 | 1 | (Solomon Islands Football Federation) Central Coast |
| 20 | FW | Rooney Riugaemai | 2004 | 0 | 0 | (Solomon Islands Football Federation) Green Shield |
| 21 | DF | Calvin Ohasio | 5 April 2000 (aged 26) | 10 | 0 | (Solomon Islands Football Federation) Malaita Kingz |
| 23 | GK | Michael Laulae | 20 May 2002 (aged 24) | 4 | 0 | (Vanuatu Football Federation) ABM Galaxy |

== Vanuatu ==
Head coach: Richard Iwai

| No. | Pos. | Player | Date of birth (age) | Caps | Goals | Club |
|---|---|---|---|---|---|---|
| 1 | GK | Zachariah Walu | | 0 | 0 | (Vanuatu Football Federation) Yatel |
| 2 | DF | Jacques Wanemut | 2 February 1992 (aged 34) | 5 | 0 | (Vanuatu Football Federation) Vanuatu United |
| 3 | DF | Henry Namatak | 6 February 1997 (aged 29) | 1 | 0 | (Vanuatu Football Federation) Vanuatu United |
| 4 | DF | Alick Worworbu | 27 August 1997 (aged 29) | 4 | 0 | (Vanuatu Football Federation) Yatel |
| 5 | DF | Semici Kaltak | 10 May 2003 (aged 23) | 0 | 0 | (Vanuatu Football Federation) Vanuatu United |
| 6 | MF | Bill Kaltak | 1 November 1987 (aged 38) | 3 | 1 | (Vanuatu Football Federation) Vanuatu United |
| 7 | MF | Joe Moses | 22 May 2002 (aged 24) | 8 | 1 | (Vanuatu Football Federation) Vanuatu United |
| 8 | FW | Andrew Malakai | 27 July 1997 (aged 29) | 3 | 1 | (Vanuatu Football Federation) Vanuatu United |
| 9 | MF | Richard Waisale | | 0 | 0 | (Vanuatu Football Federation) Yatel |
| 10 | FW | Tony Kaltak | 5 November 1996 (aged 29) | 16 | 15 | (Vanuatu Football Federation) Vanuatu United |
| 11 | MF | Kathy Iamak | 6 November 2005 (aged 20) | 4 | 0 | (Vanuatu Football Federation) Yatel |
| 12 | MF | Jayson Bule | 21 January 2001 (aged 25) | 0 | 0 | (Vanuatu Football Federation) North Efate United |
| 13 | FW | Azariah Soromon | 1 March 1999 (aged 27) | 25 | 11 | (Vanuatu Football Federation) Vanuatu United |
| 14 | DF | Ignace Iamak | 25 March 1990 (aged 36) | 5 | 0 | (Vanuatu Football Federation) Yatel |
| 15 | FW | Edward Roqara | 16 April 2004 (aged 22) | 3 | 0 | (Vanuatu Football Federation) Vanuatu United |
| 16 | MF | Obed Solomon | | 1 | 0 | (Vanuatu Football Federation) Naka |
| 17 | MF | John Alick | 25 April 1991 (aged 35) | 29 | 2 | (Fiji Football Association) Ba |
| 18 | MF | Nalihi Ehnarua | | 1 | 0 | (Vanuatu Football Federation) Yatel |
| 19 | MF | Ryan Wanemut | 12 September 2007 (aged 19) | 3 | 0 | (Vanuatu Football Federation) Erakor Gold Star |
| 20 | GK | Kaloran Firiam | 10 December 1994 (aged 31) | 6 | 0 | (Vanuatu Football Federation) Vanuatu United |
