= 2026 OFC Professional League knockout stage =

Oceania club football tournament

The 2026 OFC Professional League knockout stage began on 17 May with the qualification play-off, and ended on 24 May 2026 with the final at Eden Park in Auckland, New Zealand, to decide the champions of the 2026 OFC Professional League. A total of five teams competed in the knockout stage, with two entering in the play-offs and three receiving a bye to the semi-finals.

== Qualified teams ==
The knockout stage involved the top four teams that qualified from the leaders group and the top team that qualified from the challengers group. The top three teams received a bye to the semi-finals, while teams finishing in positions 4 to 5 entered the qualification play-offs.

Entering the semi-finals
Pos	Team
1	(Australia) South Melbourne
2	(New Zealand) Auckland FC
3	(New Zealand) South Island United

Entering the play-off
Pos	Team
4	(Fiji) Bula FC
5	Vanuatu United

== Format ==
Each tie in the knockout phase was one leg, with each match taking place in Auckland, New Zealand. If the score was level, then 30 minutes of extra time were played. If the score was still level at the end of extra time, the winners were decided by a penalty shoot-out. In the final, if the score was level at the end of normal time, extra time was played, followed by a penalty shoot-out if the score was still level.

== Schedule ==
The schedule was as follows.

Round	Date
Qualification play-off	17 May 2026
Semi-finals	20 May 2026
Final	24 May 2026 at Eden Park, Auckland

== Bracket ==
Qualification play-off
17 May — Auckland (MSS)
4	(Fiji) Bula FC	1
5	Vanuatu United (a.e.t.)	2

Semi-finals
20 May — Auckland (MSS)
1	(Australia) South Melbourne	4
5	Vanuatu United	0
20 May — Auckland (MSS)
2	(New Zealand) Auckland FC	1
3	(New Zealand) South Island United	0

Final
24 May — Auckland (EP)
1	(Australia) South Melbourne	1
2	(New Zealand) Auckland FC	2

== Qualification play-off ==
Team 1	Score	Team 2
Bula FC (Fiji)	1–2 (a.e.t.)	Vanuatu United

17 May 2026
15:00 (NZST)

Bula FC (Fiji)	1–2 (a.e.t.)	Vanuatu United
Sela 18'	(OFC) (Report)	Soromon 90+11'; Haruel 120+1'

Mount Smart Stadium, Auckland
Attendance: 1,311
Referee: Campbell-Kirk Kawana-Waugh (New Zealand)

== Semi-finals ==
Team 1	Score	Team 2
South Melbourne (Australia)	4–0	Vanuatu United
Auckland FC (New Zealand)	1–0	(New Zealand) South Island United

20 May 2026
13:30 (NZST)

South Melbourne (Australia)	4–0	Vanuatu United
Swibel 17'; Acton 32' (o.g.); Mikkola 39'; Giannakopoulos 57'	(OFC) (Report)

Mount Smart Stadium, Auckland
Attendance: 214
Referee: Anna-Marie Keighley (New Zealand)
20 May 2026
18:30 (NZST)

Auckland FC (New Zealand)	1–0	(New Zealand) South Island United
Prins 72'	(OFC) (Report)

Mount Smart Stadium, Auckland
Attendance: 614
Referee: Calvin Berg (New Zealand)

== Final ==
The final was played on 24 May at Eden Park in Auckland. The winner of semi-final 1 was designated as the "home" team for administrative purposes.

24 May 2026
15:00 UTC+12

South Melbourne (Australia)	1–2	(New Zealand) Auckland FC
Uchida 90+7'	(OFC) (Report)	Normann 23'; Ellis 72'

Eden Park, Auckland
Attendance: 3,470
Referee: Campbell-Kirk Kawana-Waugh (New Zealand)
