= 2026 OFC Professional League =

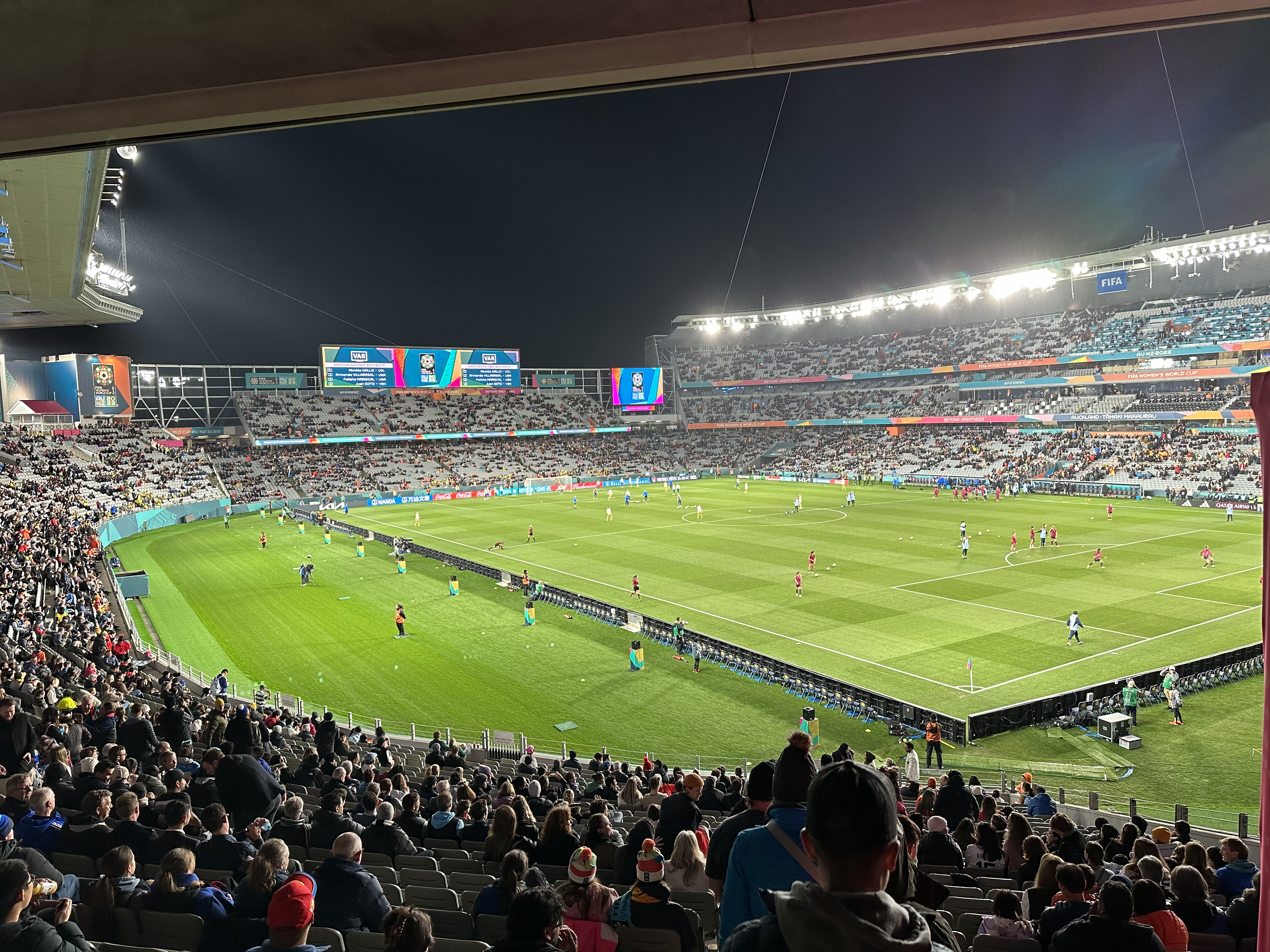
- Eden Park in Auckland hosted the final.

Tournament details
- Dates: Circuit series: 17 January – 21 April; Playoff groups: 6–24 May
- Teams: 8 (from 7 associations)

Final positions
- Champions: (New Zealand) Auckland FC (1st title)
- Runners-up: (Australia) South Melbourne

Tournament statistics
- Matches played: 72
- Goals scored: 230 (3.19 per match)
- Attendance: 80,053 (1,112 per match)
- Top scorer(s): Alex Saniel (Vanuatu United); 11 goals
- Best player: Daniel Normann (Auckland FC)
- Best goalkeeper: Oscar Mason (Auckland FC)
- Fair play award: (New Zealand) Auckland FC

The 2026 OFC Professional League was the inaugural season of the OFC Professional League, a men's professional football league in the Oceania region, organized by the Oceania Football Confederation (OFC) and featured eight clubs from seven nations, competing in a circuit series format across various Pacific locations.

The winners, Auckland FC, qualified for the 2026 FIFA Intercontinental Cup, with a potential pathway to the 2029 FIFA Club World Cup.

== Clubs ==
Locations of clubs competing in the 2026 season

=== Clubs and locations ===
Club	City
(New Zealand) Auckland FC (Note: The club had a restriction on players not signed to A-League contracts.)	Auckland
(Fiji) Bula FC	Suva
(Papua New Guinea) PNG Hekari	Port Moresby
(Solomon Islands) Solomon Kings	Honiara
(New Zealand) South Island United	Christchurch
(Australia) South Melbourne	Melbourne
(French Polynesia) Tahiti United	Pīraʻe
Vanuatu United	Port Vila

=== Personnel and kits ===
Club	Manager	Captain	Kit manufacturer	Shirt sponsor
(New Zealand) Auckland FC	(Australia) Luke Casserly	(Australia) Tass Mourdoukoutas	New Balance	ANZ
(Fiji) Bula FC	(Guadeloupe) Stéphane Auvray	(Fiji) Roy Krishna	RK21	Extra Supermarket
(Papua New Guinea) PNG Hekari	(Solomon Islands) Jerry Allen (interim)	(Papua New Guinea) David Tomare		MRDC
(Solomon Islands) Solomon Kings	(England) Ben Cahn	(Solomon Islands) Philip Mango	Stanno	Solomon Ports
(New Zealand) South Island United	(Wales) Rob Sherman	(New Zealand) Christian Gray	New Balance	Go Media
(Australia) South Melbourne	(Australia) Siniša Cohadzić	(Australia) Marko Janković	Kappa	Directed Group
(French Polynesia) Tahiti United	(French Polynesia) Samuel Garcia	(French Polynesia) Teaonui Tehau	Adidas	Okipik
Vanuatu United	(Germany) Lars Hopp	(Vanuatu) Michel Coulon	Football Central	None

=== Kits ===
Auckland FC	Bula FC	PNG Hekari	Solomon Kings
South Island United	South Melbourne	Tahiti United	Vanuatu United

=== Managerial changes ===
Club	Outgoing manager	Manner of departure	Date of vacancy	Position on table	Incoming manager	Date of appointment
(Papua New Guinea) PNG Hekari	(Brazil) Marcos Gusmão	Resigned	3 February 2026	8th	(Solomon Islands) Jerry Allen (interim)	3 February 2026

=== Foreign players ===
Club	Player 1	Player 2	Player 3	OFC player 1	OFC player 2	OFC player 3
(New Zealand) Auckland FC	(Australia) Tass Mourdoukoutas	(Norway) Daniel Normann	(United States) Jonathan Robinson			
(Fiji) Bula FC	(France) Didier Desprez	(Japan) Yuta Konagaya	(Trinidad and Tobago) Kaïlé Auvray	(New Zealand) Matthew Foord	(New Zealand) Fergus Gillion	(New Zealand) Adam Supyk
(Papua New Guinea) PNG Hekari	(Brazil) Erick Joe	(Brazil) Kaue Silva	(Brazil) Rafael Chaves	(Solomon Islands) Leon Kofana	(Solomon Islands) John Orobulu	(Vanuatu) John Alick
(Solomon Islands) Solomon Kings	(Australia) Jez Lofthouse	(Japan) Sota Higashide				
(New Zealand) South Island United	(Australia) Deen Hasanovic	(Australia) Jacob Krayem	(Netherlands) Steven van Dijk	(Samoa) Dauntae Mariner		
(Australia) South Melbourne	(Japan) Yuki Uchida			(New Zealand) Ishveer Singh		
(French Polynesia) Tahiti United	(Canada) Jackson Gardner			(New Caledonia) Joseph Athale	(Fiji) Tevita Waranaivalu	(New Caledonia) Germain Haewegene
Vanuatu United	(Australia) Matt Acton	(Australia) Hassan Ramazani	(United States) William Cardona	(New Zealand) Otto Ingham	(New Zealand) Owen Smith	(Papua New Guinea) Raymond Diho

== Format ==
The competition featured five circuit series rounds followed by two play-off groups (Leaders and Challengers) before the semi-finals and final.

== Venues ==
Locations of the 2026 OFC Professional League venues

The circuit series matches were played in Auckland, Ba, Honiara, Melbourne, Port Moresby and Suva.

Round 1, Playoff Round and Finals		Round 2
(New Zealand) Auckland		(Papua New Guinea) Port Moresby
Eden Park	North Harbour Stadium	PNG Football Stadium
Capacity: 50,000	Capacity: 14,000	Capacity: 14,800
	The stadium from the south-east.	
Round 3		Round 4
(Australia) Melbourne		(Solomon Islands) Honiara
Olympic Village	The Home of the Matildas	National Stadium
Capacity: 12,000	Capacity: 3,500	Capacity: 10,000
Round 5
(Fiji) Ba	(Fiji) Suva	
Govind Park	Buckhurst Park	
Capacity: 13,500	Capacity: 15,446	
Govind-Park-Fiji		

== Circuit series ==
=== League table ===
Pos	Team	Pld	W	D	L	GF	GA	GD	Pts	Qualification
1	(New Zealand) Auckland FC	14	10	2	2	26	10	+16	32	Qualification for Leaders play-off group
2	(Australia) South Melbourne	14	7	4	3	40	18	+22	25	Qualification for Leaders play-off group
3	(Fiji) Bula FC	14	6	3	5	14	15	−1	21	Qualification for Leaders play-off group
4	(New Zealand) South Island United	14	5	5	4	24	26	−2	20	Qualification for Leaders play-off group
5	(Solomon Islands) Solomon Kings	14	5	3	6	14	21	−7	18	Qualification for Challengers play-off group
6	(French Polynesia) Tahiti United	14	4	5	5	20	28	−8	17	Qualification for Challengers play-off group
7	Vanuatu United	14	3	4	7	20	25	−5	13	Qualification for Challengers play-off group
8	(Papua New Guinea) PNG Hekari	14	2	2	10	14	29	−15	8	Qualification for Challengers play-off group

Source: OFC Pro League
Rules for classification: 1) Points; 2) Goal difference; 3) Goals scored; 4) Head to head; 5) Head to head goal difference; 6) Head to head goals scored; 7) Disciplinary record; 8) Coin toss

=== Results ===
Circuit 1
Home team	Score	Away team
Vanuatu United	2–2	(Fiji) Bula FC
Auckland FC (New Zealand)	3–0	(New Zealand) South Island United
Tahiti United (French Polynesia)	1–2	(Australia) South Melbourne
PNG Hekari (Papua New Guinea)	0–1	(Solomon Islands) Solomon Kings
Bula FC (Fiji)	0–0	(New Zealand) South Island United
Auckland FC (New Zealand)	3–1	Vanuatu United
Tahiti United (French Polynesia)	2–1	(Papua New Guinea) PNG Hekari
South Melbourne (Australia)	5–0	(Solomon Islands) Solomon Kings
South Island United (New Zealand)	2–1	Vanuatu United
Auckland FC (New Zealand)	1–0	(Fiji) Bula FC
Solomon Kings (Solomon Islands)	0–0	(French Polynesia) Tahiti United
PNG Hekari (Papua New Guinea)	0–5	(Australia) South Melbourne

Circuit 2
Home team	Score	Away team
Vanuatu United	2–2	(French Polynesia) Tahiti United
PNG Hekari (Papua New Guinea)	0–2	(New Zealand) Auckland FC
South Island United (New Zealand)	3–3	(Australia) South Melbourne
Bula FC (Fiji)	1–0	(Solomon Islands) Solomon Kings
Tahiti United (French Polynesia)	0–4	(New Zealand) Auckland FC
PNG Hekari (Papua New Guinea)	2–2	Vanuatu United
Solomon Kings (Solomon Islands)	0–0	(New Zealand) South Island United
Bula FC (Fiji)	1–1	(Australia) South Melbourne
Auckland FC (New Zealand)	1–3	(Solomon Islands) Solomon Kings
PNG Hekari (Papua New Guinea)	1–2	(New Zealand) South Island United
South Melbourne (Australia)	5–2	Vanuatu United
Tahiti United (French Polynesia)	1–0	(Fiji) Bula FC

Circuit 3
Home team	Score	Away team
Tahiti United (French Polynesia)	2–2	(New Zealand) South Island United
South Melbourne (Australia)	1–1	(New Zealand) Auckland FC
Bula FC (Fiji)	0–2	Vanuatu United
Solomon Kings (Solomon Islands)	2–1	(Papua New Guinea) PNG Hekari
South Island United (New Zealand)	1–3	(New Zealand) Auckland FC
South Melbourne (Australia)	8–1	(French Polynesia) Tahiti United
Vanuatu United	2–0	(Solomon Islands) Solomon Kings
PNG Hekari (Papua New Guinea)	1–2	(Fiji) Bula FC
Auckland FC (New Zealand)	1–0	(French Polynesia) Tahiti United
South Melbourne (Australia)	4–1	(New Zealand) South Island United
Vanuatu United	1–3	(Papua New Guinea) PNG Hekari
Solomon Kings (Solomon Islands)	2–0	(Fiji) Bula FC

Circuit 4
Home team	Score	Away team
South Island United (New Zealand)	4–1	(Papua New Guinea) PNG Hekari
Solomon Kings (Solomon Islands)	0–1	(New Zealand) Auckland FC
Vanuatu United	2–0	(Australia) South Melbourne
Bula FC (Fiji)	2–0	(French Polynesia) Tahiti United
Vanuatu United	0–0	(New Zealand) Auckland FC
PNG Hekari (Papua New Guinea)	2–2	(French Polynesia) Tahiti United
South Island United (New Zealand)	2–3	(Fiji) Bula FC
Solomon Kings (Solomon Islands)	1–1	(Australia) South Melbourne

Circuit 5
Home team	Score	Away team
Vanuatu United	1–2	(New Zealand) South Island United
Tahiti United (French Polynesia)	5–1	(Solomon Islands) Solomon Kings
Auckland FC (New Zealand)	3–2	(Australia) South Melbourne
Bula FC (Fiji)	1–0	(Papua New Guinea) PNG Hekari
South Island United (New Zealand)	3–3	(French Polynesia) Tahiti United
Solomon Kings (Solomon Islands)	3–2	Vanuatu United
Auckland FC (New Zealand)	2–0	(Papua New Guinea) PNG Hekari
South Melbourne (Australia)	2–0	(Fiji) Bula FC
South Island United (New Zealand)	2–1	(Solomon Islands) Solomon Kings
Tahiti United (French Polynesia)	1–0	Vanuatu United
South Melbourne (Australia)	1–2	(Papua New Guinea) PNG Hekari
Bula FC (Fiji)	2–1	(New Zealand) Auckland FC

== Play-off round ==
=== Leaders play-off group ===
==== League table ====
Pos	Team	Pld	W	D	L	GF	GA	GD	Pts	Qualification
1	(Australia) South Melbourne	3	3	0	0	10	5	+5	9	Qualification for semi-finals
2	(New Zealand) Auckland FC	3	2	0	1	8	4	+4	6	Qualification for semi-finals
3	(New Zealand) South Island United	3	1	0	2	5	9	−4	3	Qualification for semi-finals
4	(Fiji) Bula FC	3	0	0	3	2	7	−5	0	Qualification for qualification play-off

Source: OFC Pro League
Rules for classification: 1) Points; 2) Goal difference; 3) Goals scored; 4) Head to head; 5) Head to head goal difference; 6) Head to head goals scored; 7) Disciplinary record; 8) Coin toss

==== Results ====
Home team	Score	Away team
Bula FC (Fiji)	0–1	(New Zealand) South Island United
Auckland FC (New Zealand)	1–2	(Australia) South Melbourne
Auckland FC (New Zealand)	2–0	(Fiji) Bula FC
South Melbourne (Australia)	4–2	(New Zealand) South Island United
South Melbourne (Australia)	4–2	(Fiji) Bula FC
Auckland FC (New Zealand)	5–2	(New Zealand) South Island United

=== Challengers play-off group ===
==== League table ====
Pos	Team	Pld	W	D	L	GF	GA	GD	Pts	Qualification
1	Vanuatu United	3	2	1	0	8	5	+3	7	Qualification for qualification play-off
2	(Solomon Islands) Solomon Kings	3	2	0	1	7	4	+3	6	
3	(French Polynesia) Tahiti United	3	0	2	1	5	6	−1	2	
4	(Papua New Guinea) PNG Hekari	3	0	1	2	3	8	−5	1	

Source: OFC Pro League
Rules for classification: 1) Points; 2) Goal difference; 3) Goals scored; 4) Head to head; 5) Head to head goal difference; 6) Head to head goals scored; 7) Disciplinary record; 8) Coin toss

==== Results ====
Home team	Score	Away team
Solomon Kings (Solomon Islands)	2–1	(French Polynesia) Tahiti United
Vanuatu United	3–1	(Papua New Guinea) PNG Hekari
Solomon Kings (Solomon Islands)	2–3	Vanuatu United
Tahiti United (French Polynesia)	2–2	(Papua New Guinea) PNG Hekari
Solomon Kings (Solomon Islands)	3–0	(Papua New Guinea) PNG Hekari
Tahiti United (French Polynesia)	2–2	Vanuatu United

== Knockout stage ==
=== Bracket ===
Qualification play-off
17 May — Auckland (MSS)
4	(Fiji) Bula FC	1
5	Vanuatu United (a.e.t.)	2

Semi-finals
20 May — Auckland (MSS)
1	(Australia) South Melbourne	4
5	Vanuatu United	0
20 May — Auckland (MSS)
2	(New Zealand) Auckland FC	1
3	(New Zealand) South Island United	0

Final
24 May — Auckland (EP)
1	(Australia) South Melbourne	1
2	(New Zealand) Auckland FC	2

=== Qualification play-off ===
Team 1	Score	Team 2
Bula FC (Fiji)	1–2 (a.e.t.)	Vanuatu United

=== Semi-finals ===
Team 1	Score	Team 2
South Melbourne (Australia)	4–0	Vanuatu United
Auckland FC (New Zealand)	1–0	(New Zealand) South Island United

=== Final ===
The final was played on 24 May at Eden Park in Auckland. The winner of semi-final 1 was designated as the "home" team for administrative purposes.

24 May 2026
15:00 UTC+12

South Melbourne (Australia)	1–2	(New Zealand) Auckland FC
Uchida 90+7'	(OFC) (Report)	Normann 23'; Ellis 72'

Eden Park, Auckland
Attendance: 3,470
Referee: Campbell-Kirk Kawana-Waugh (New Zealand)

== Statistics ==
=== Top goalscorers ===
Rank	Player	Club	Goals
1	(Vanuatu) Alex Saniel	Vanuatu United	11
2	(Australia) Jordan Swibel	(Australia) South Melbourne	10
3	(New Zealand) Ryan Feutz	(New Zealand) South Island United	9
4	(Australia) Jez Lofthouse	(Solomon Islands) Solomon Kings	7
4	(French Polynesia) Teaonui Tehau	(French Polynesia) Tahiti United	7
4	(Australia) Max Mikkola	(Australia) South Melbourne	7
4	(Japan) Yuki Uchida	(Australia) South Melbourne	7
8	(Solomon Islands) Rovu Boyers	(New Zealand) South Island United	6
8	(New Caledonia) Germain Haewegene	(French Polynesia) Tahiti United	6
8	(Japan) Sota Higashide	(Solomon Islands) Solomon Kings	6
8	(Australia) Andrew Messourouni	(Australia) South Melbourne	6

=== Clean sheets ===
Rank	Player	Club	Clean sheets
1	(New Zealand) Oscar Mason	(New Zealand) Auckland FC	8
2	(Solomon Islands) Philip Mango	(Solomon Islands) Solomon Kings	5
3	(Australia) Matt Acton	Vanuatu United	4
4	(Netherlands) Steven van Dijk	(New Zealand) South Island United	3
4	(Spain) Javier López	(Australia) South Melbourne	3
6	(New Zealand) Blake Callinan	(New Zealand) Auckland FC	2
6	(France) Didier Desprez	(Fiji) Bula FC	2
6	(New Zealand) Matt Foord	(Fiji) Bula FC	2
6	(French Polynesia) Jackson Teamotuaitau	(French Polynesia) Tahiti United	2
10	(Canada) Jackson Gardner	(French Polynesia) Tahiti United	1
10	(Australia) Iliya Shalamanov-Trenkov	(Australia) South Melbourne	1

=== Awards ===
Award	Winner	Club
Golden Ball	(Norway) Daniel Normann	(New Zealand) Auckland FC
Golden Boot	(Vanuatu) Alex Saniel	Vanuatu United
Golden Glove	(New Zealand) Oscar Mason	(New Zealand) Auckland FC
Fair Play Award	—N/a	(New Zealand) Auckland FC

=== Team of the Season ===
The Oceania Football Confederation selected the following players as the team of the tournament.

Pos.	Player	Club
GK	(New Zealand) Oscar Mason	(New Zealand) Auckland FC
DF	(Australia) Jordon Lampard	(Australia) South Melbourne
DF	(Australia) Hassan Ramazani	Vanuatu United
DF	(New Zealand) Ronan Wynne	(New Zealand) Auckland FC
MF	(Norway) Daniel Normann	(New Zealand) Auckland FC
MF	(New Zealand) Owen Smith	Vanuatu United
MF	(Japan) Yuki Uchida	(Australia) South Melbourne
MF	(Japan) Sota Higashide	(Solomon Islands) Solomon Kings
MF	(Australia) Jez Lofthouse	(Solomon Islands) Solomon Kings
FW	(Australia) Jordan Swibel	(Australia) South Melbourne
FW	(Vanuatu) Alex Saniel	Vanuatu United
SUB	(Solomon Islands) Philip Mango	(Solomon Islands) Solomon Kings
SUB	(Netherlands) Steven van Dijk	(New Zealand) South Island United
SUB	(Fiji) Sterling Vasconcellos	(Fiji) Bula FC
SUB	(New Caledonia) Joseph Athale	(French Polynesia) Tahiti United
SUB	(Vanuatu) John Alick	(Papua New Guinea) PNG Hekari
SUB	(New Zealand) Reid Drake	(New Zealand) Auckland FC
SUB	(United States) William Cardona	Vanuatu United
SUB	(New Zealand) David Yoo	(New Zealand) South Island United
SUB	(Australia) Max Mikkola	(Australia) South Melbourne
SUB	(New Zealand) Liam Gillion	(New Zealand) Auckland FC
SUB	(Trinidad and Tobago) Kaile Auvray	(Fiji) Bula FC
SUB	(New Caledonia) Germain Haewegene	(French Polynesia) Tahiti United
SUB	(French Polynesia) Teaonui Tehau	(French Polynesia) Tahiti United
SUB	(New Zealand) Ryan Feutz	(New Zealand) South Island United

== See also ==
- 2026 OFC Men's Champions League
- 2026 Auckland FC (OFC Professional League) season
- 2026 South Island United FC season
- 2026 South Melbourne FC season
