= Ronan Wynne =

New Zealand footballer (born 2001)

Personal information
- Date of birth: 28 May 2001 (age 25)
- Place of birth: Cape Town, South Africa
- Height: 1.79 m (5 ft 10 in)
- Position: Defender

Team information
- Current team: Auckland FC
- Number: 23

Youth career
- East Coast Bays
- Western Springs
- 2018–2020: Wellington Phoenix
- 2020: AC Horsens

College career
Years	Team	Apps	(Gls)
2021–2024	Denver Pioneers	70	(4)

Senior career*
Years	Team	Apps	(Gls)
2020–2021	FC Roskilde	6	(0)
2024–2026	Atlanta United	0	(0)
2024–2026	Atlanta United 2	28	(1)
2026	Auckland FC (OFC)	17	(1)
2026–	Auckland FC	2	(0)

International career^{‡}
2023	New Zealand U23	2	(0)
- * Club domestic league appearances and goals as of 7 November 2026 ‡ National team caps and goals as of 26 March 2023

Ronan Wynne (born 28 May 2001) is a New Zealand professional footballer who plays as a defender for A-League Men side Auckland FC.

== Early career ==
Wynne played youth football in Auckland and Wellington with East Coast Bays, Western Springs, Wellington United and Lower Hutt City before joining the Wellington Phoenix Reserves in 2018. He made 32 appearances in the Premiership before departing in 2020 to pursue opportunities in Denmark, where he spent time with AC Horsens and FC Roskilde.

Wynne played collegiate soccer for the Denver Pioneers men's soccer between 2021 and 2024. Primarily a right-back, he made 70 appearances, scoring four goals and providing 13 assists.

== Club career ==
=== Atlanta United ===
Wynne was selected 53rd overall by Atlanta United in the 2025 MLS SuperDraft. He made his professional debut for Atlanta United 2 on 7 March 2025 against New York Red Bulls II. In December 2025, following the expiry of his initial contract, Atlanta United announced that Wynne would depart the club. Wynne made 28 appearances, scoring one goal for the MLS Next Pro side.

=== Auckland FC (OFC Professional League) ===
On 8 January 2026, Wynne was named in Auckland FC's squad for the inaugural OFC Professional League season. On 20 January, he made his debut for the club in the second match of the campaign, starting at right-back and playing the full 90 minutes in a 3–1 victory over Vanuatu United at North Harbour Stadium. During the match, Wynne assisted Luka Vicelich from a long throw to open the scoring.

On 12 April, Wynne scored his first goal for Auckland FC in a 3–2 victory over South Melbourne at Govind Park, scoring Auckland's third and winning goal. He made 17 appearances during the club's inaugural OFC Professional League campaign, including playing the full 90 minutes in the 2026 OFC Professional League final, as Auckland defeated South Melbourne 2–1 to win the inaugural title. Although he began the season at right-back, Wynne was primarily deployed as a centre-back alongside Tass Mourdoukoutas. At the conclusion of the campaign, he was named Auckland FC's OFC Professional League Club MVP.

=== Auckland FC ===
On 15 July 2026, Wynne was promoted to Auckland FC's A-League Men squad alongside fellow OFC Professional League teammate Daniel Normann. Wynne made his A-League Men debut on 30 October, starting in a 1–1 draw against Brisbane Roar at Suncorp Stadium in the third round of the 2026–27 season.

== Personal life ==
Wynne is the younger brother to Green Gully defender Deklan Wynne. While playing for the Wellington Phoenix Reserves, Wynne attended Wellington College.

== Career statistics ==
As of match played 7 November 2026.

Club	Season	League			Cup (Note: Appearance(s) in Chatham Cup, Danish Cup)		Other		Total	
Club	Season	Division	Apps	Goals	Apps	Goals	Apps	Goals	Apps	Goals
Wellington United	2018	Central League	14	0	1	0	—		15	0
Wellington Phoenix Reserves	2018–19	Premiership	16	0	—		—		16	0
Wellington Phoenix Reserves	2019–20	Premiership	16	0	—		—		16	0
Wellington Phoenix Reserves	Total		32	0	—		—		32	0
AC Horsens	2021–22	1st Division	0	0	0	0	1 (Note: Appearance in Future Cup)	0	1	0
FC Roskilde	2021–22	2nd Division	6	0	1	0	—		7	0
Denver Pioneers	2020	NCAA Division I	8	0	—		—		8	0
Denver Pioneers	2021	NCAA Division I	17	1	—		—		17	1
Denver Pioneers	2022	NCAA Division I	22	1	—		—		22	1
Denver Pioneers	2024	NCAA Division I	23	2	—		—		23	2
Denver Pioneers	Total		70	4	—		—		70	4
Atlanta United	2025	Major League Soccer	0	0	—		—		0	0
Atlanta United 2	2025	MLS Next Pro	28	1	—		—		28	1
Auckland FC	2026	OFC Professional League	17	1	—		—		17	1
Auckland FC	2026–27	A-League Men	2	0	—		1 (Note: Appearance in FIFA Intercontinental Cup)	0	3	0
Career total			169	6	2	0	2	0	173	6

== Honours ==
Auckland FC

- OFC Professional League: 2026
