= Hassan Ramazani =

Australian soccer player

Personal information
- Date of birth: 8 August 2001 (age 25)
- Place of birth: Brisbane, Queensland, Australia
- Height: 1.84 m (6 ft 0 in)
- Position: Full-back

Team information
- Current team: South Melbourne (on loan from Vanuatu United)
- Number: 5

Youth career
- Brisbane Strikers
- 2016–2019: Brisbane Roar

Senior career*
Years	Team	Apps	(Gls)
2019–2021	Brisbane Roar NPL	51	(3)
2021	Brisbane Roar	1	(0)
2022–2025	Lions FC	82	(3)
2026–	Vanuatu United	19	(0)
2026–	→ South Melbourne (loan)	10	(0)
- * Club domestic league appearances and goals as of 17 January 2026 ‡ National team caps and goals as of 25 May 2021

Hassan Ramazani (born 8 August 2001), is an Australian professional soccer player who plays as a full-back for NPL Victoria side South Melbourne, on loan from OFC Professional League side Vanuatu United.

== Club career ==
On 1 November 2025, Ramazani was signed by Vanuatu United for their inaugural squad for the 2026 OFC Professional League.

On 2 July 2026, South Melbourne announced they had signed Ramazani on loan for the remainder of the season.

== Personal life ==
Ramazani is of Republic of the Congo descent.

== Honours ==
South Melbourne FC

- Australia Cup: 2026

Individual

- OFC Professional League Team of the Season: 2026
