= Yuta Konagaya =

Japanese footballer

Personal information
- Date of birth: 5 August 1993 (age 33)
- Place of birth: Japan
- Position: Midfielder

Team information
- Current team: Bula FC

Senior career*
Years	Team	Apps	(Gls)
2016	Saints	15	(7)
2016	Bunbury United		
2017	Blacktown City		
2018–2020	Port Melbourne Sharks		
2020–2022	Zakynthos	4+	(0+)
2024	Weston Bears FC	9	(1)
2026–	Bula FC	0	(0)
- * Club domestic league appearances and goals

Yuta Konagaya (小長谷 勇太, Konagaya Yūta; born 5 August 1993) is a Japanese footballer who plays as a midfielder for Bula FC.

== Early life ==
Konagaya began playing football in Japan at age 6, when he joined a local club alongside a friend.

== Career ==
In 2016, Konagaya signed for Australian third division side Saints. In 2016, he signed for Bunbury United in the Australian fifth division. In 2018, he signed for Australian second division club Port Melbourne Sharks. In 2020, Konagaya signed for Zakynthos in the Greek second division. In December 2025, he joined Fijian team Bula FC.
