= Matt Acton =

Australian soccer player

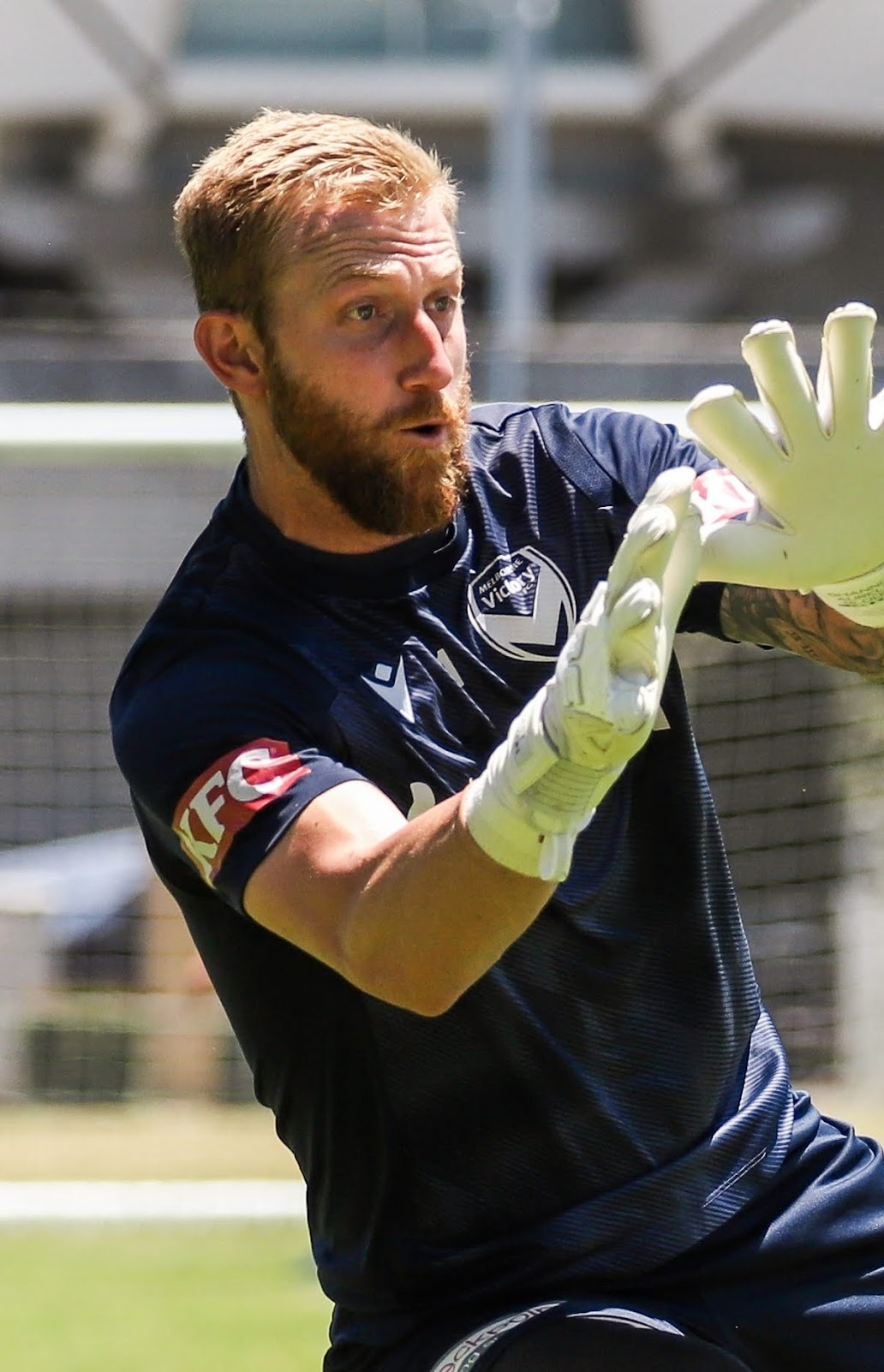
- Acton in 2022

Personal information
- Full name: Matthew Michael Acton
- Date of birth: 3 June 1992 (age 34)
- Place of birth: Townsville, Queensland, Australia
- Height: 1.84 m (6 ft 0 in)
- Position: Goalkeeper

Team information
- Current team: Vanuatu United

Youth career
- 2007–2011: QAS
- 2007–2014: Brisbane Roar

Senior career*
Years	Team	Apps	(Gls)
2013–2014	Brisbane Roar	2	(0)
2014	Yangon United	14	(0)
2014–2015	Brisbane Roar	0	(0)
2015	Olympic FC	16	(0)
2015–2016	Kaya	26	(0)
2016–2023	Melbourne Victory	38	(0)
2023–2025	Brisbane Roar	11	(0)
2025	Lions FC	10	(0)
2026–	Vanuatu United	18	(0)

International career^{‡}
2011	Australia U20	2	(0)
Medal record
Representing Australia
Men's Association football
AFC U-20 Asian Cup
Runner-up	2010 China
- * Club domestic league appearances and goals as of 1 November 2025 ‡ National team caps and goals as of 30 November 2013

Matthew Michael Acton (born 3 June 1992) is an Australian soccer player who currently plays for Vanuatu United. Besides Australia, he has played in Myanmar and the Philippines.

== Club career ==
Acton played for Brisbane Roar. He became the first Australian goalkeeper to join the Myanmar National League when Yangon United signed him in. He was a starting player in all of his 14 caps for Yangon where in five games he managed to keep a clean sheet. He assisted Yangon in their second-place finish. After his stint with Yangon he return Brisbane Roar then joined Olympic F.C.

In December 2015, Kaya F.C. of the United Football League announced that they had signed Acton.

On 25 November 2016, Melbourne Victory signed Acton as an injury replacement for Alastair Bray, after both had trialled with Melbourne Victory pre-season.

After Lawrence Thomas was ruled out with injury, Acton made his debut for Melbourne Victory on 26 November 2016, in a 2–0 victory over the Newcastle Jets.

On 24 September 2020, Melbourne Victory Re-signed Acton for extend three-year deal.

On 3 July 2023, Brisbane Roar announced that Matt Acton has signed once again for the club that he began at.

Acton was announced in the inaugural squad for Vanuatu United on 30 October 2025, for the 2026 OFC Professional League.

== Personal life ==
Acton was born in Australia to an English-Finnish father and English mother. He acquired Finnish citizenship in 2011.

== Career statistics ==
As of 7 October 2014

Notes CS = Clean Sheets

Club	Season	Division	League^{1}		Cup		International^{2}		Total	
Club	Season	Division	Apps	CS	Apps	CS	Apps	CS	Apps	CS
Brisbane Roar	2013–14	A-League	2	1	–	–	–	–	2	1
Brisbane Roar	2014–15	A-League	0	0	–	–	0	0	0	0
Brisbane Roar	Total		2	1	–	–	0	0	2	1
Yangon United	2014	Myanmar National League	14	5	–	–	–	–	14	5
Yangon United	Total		14	5	0	0	0	0	14	5
Career Total			16	6	0	0	0	0	16	6

^{1} - includes A-League final series statistics
^{2} - AFC Champions League statistics are included in season commencing during group stages (i.e. ACL 2015 and A-League season 2014–15 etc.)

== Honours ==
Brisbane Roar

- A-League Championship: 2013–14
- A-League Premiership: 2013–14

Melbourne Victory

- A-League Championship: 2017–18
- FFA Cup: 2021

Australia U-20

- AFC U-20 Asian Cup: runner-up 2010
