= Philip Mango =

Solomon Islands footballer (born 1995)

Personal information
- Full name: Philip Mango
- Date of birth: 28 August 1995 (age 31)
- Place of birth: Malaita Province, Solomon Islands
- Height: 1.78 m (5 ft 10 in)
- Position: Goalkeeper

Team information
- Current team: Solomon Kings
- Number: 1

Senior career*
Years	Team	Apps	(Gls)
2010–2013	Marist		
2013–2015	Western United		
2015–2017	Marist		
2017–2018	Kossa		
2018–2025	Solomon Warriors		
2026–	Solomon Kings	11	(0)

International career^{‡}
2011	Solomon Islands U-17	1	(0)
2014	Solomon Islands U-20	5	(0)
2015	Solomon Islands U-23	6	(0)
2016–	Solomon Islands	44	(0)
Medal record
Representing Solomon Islands
Silver medal – second place	2023 Solomon Islands
MSG Prime Minister's Cup
Winner	2023 New Caledonia
- * Club domestic league appearances and goals as of 17 April 2026 ‡ National team caps and goals as of 30 March 2026

Philip Mango (born 28 August 1995) is a Solomon Islands footballer who plays as a goalkeeper for the Solomon Kings and the Solomon Islands national team.

== International career ==
He made his debut for the national team on March 24, 2016 in their 2–0 victory against Papua New Guinea.

He was also called up to the national futsal team squad for the 2016 FIFA Futsal World Cup.

== Private ==
Mango identifies Spain goalkeeper Iker Casillas and former Solomon Islands national goalkeeper Shadrack Ramoni as the two men he looks up to.

== Honours ==
Solomon Islands

- Pacific Games: Silver Medalist, 2023
- MSG Prime Minister's Cup: 2023

Individual

- OFC Professional League Team of the Season: 2026 (substitute)
