= Samuel Garcia (footballer, born 1975) =

Tahitian footballer and coach

Personal information
- Full name: Samuel Garcia
- Date of birth: 2 October 1975 (age 51)
- Place of birth: Tahiti
- Position: Defender

Team information
- Current team: Tahiti United (manager)

Senior career*
Years	Team	Apps	(Gls)
1997–2007	AS Vénus	?	(?)

International career^{‡}
1998–2007	Tahiti	19	(2)

Managerial career
- 2012–2013: Aceh United (assistant)
- 2013: Pro Duta
- 2013–2014: AS Pirae (assistant)
- 2014–2018: AS Pirae
- 2018–2023: AS Vénus
- 2019–2025: Tahiti
- 2025–: Tahiti United
Medal record
Men's football
Representing Tahiti(as player)
OFC Nations Cup
Third place	2002 New Zealand
Representing Tahiti(as manager)
OFC Nations Cup
Third place	2024 Fiji/Vanuatu
- * Club domestic league appearances and goals as of 27 January 2015 ‡ National team caps and goals as of 28 May 2023

Samuel Garcia (born 2 October 1975 in Tahiti) is a football coach and former player who played as a defender. He is currently head coach of OFC Professional League club Tahiti United.

== International goals ==
#	Date	Venue	Opponent	Score	Result	Competition
1	13 June 2001	North Harbour Stadium, Auckland,	Solomon Islands	1–0	2–0	2002 FIFA World Cup qualification
2	9 July 2002	North Harbour Stadium, Albany,	Papua New Guinea	1–0	2–1	2002 OFC Nations Cup

=== Managerial record ===
As of match played 21 March 2025

Managerial record by team and tenure
Team	Nat	From	To	Record					Ref.
Team	Nat	From	To	G	W	D	L	Win %	Ref.
Tahiti		2019	present	27	13	4	10	48.15	
Career Total				27	13	4	10	48.15	—

== Honours ==
=== Player ===
Tahiti

- OFC Nations Cup: 3rd place 2002

=== Manager ===
Tahiti

- OFC Nations Cup: 3rd place 2024
