= Daniel Normann =

Norwegian footballer (born 2002)

Personal information
- Date of birth: 21 July 2002 (age 24)
- Place of birth: Stord, Norway
- Height: 1.73 m (5 ft 8 in)
- Position: Midfielder

Team information
- Current team: Auckland FC
- Number: 16

Youth career
- 2019–2021: FK Haugesund

College career
Years	Team	Apps	(Gls)
2021–2022	Cal Poly	14	(0)
2022–2024	Missouri State	48	(3)

Senior career*
Years	Team	Apps	(Gls)
2024	IL Trio	3	(0)
2025	Manurewa	3	(0)
2025–2026	Western Springs	27	(3)
2026	Auckland FC (OFC)	19	(2)
2026–	Auckland FC	4	(0)
- * Club domestic league appearances and goals as of 7 November 2026

Daniel Normann (born 21 July 2002) is a Norwegian professional footballer who plays as a midfielder for A-League Men side Auckland FC.

== Early career ==
Normann came through the youth system of Norwegian club FK Haugesund, playing for both the club's youth teams and FK Haugesund 2. In 2021, he moved to the United States to attend California Polytechnic State University, where he played for the Cal Poly Mustangs. During his freshman season, he made 14 appearances, including eight starts, and recorded his first collegiate assist against UC San Diego.

In 2022, Normann transferred to Missouri State University where he played for the Missouri State Bears soccer team. During his time with the Bears, he was named to the Missouri Valley Conference Scholar-Athlete First Team in 2024. Normann made 48 appearances and scored three goals during his time with the Missouri State Bears before returning to his hometown in Norway, where he joined Idrettslaget Trio.

== Club career ==
=== National League ===
In 2025, Normann moved to New Zealand, joining Northern League club Manurewa, where he made three appearances. He later joined fellow Northern League side Western Springs, making 27 appearances and scoring three goals as the club won the 2025 Northern League title.

=== Auckland FC ===
==== OFC Professional League ====
On 17 December 2025, it was announced that Normann would join Auckland FC's OFC Professional League squad for the inaugural competition, which commenced in January 2026. He started and played the full 90 minutes in Auckland's inaugural OFC Professional League match, a 3–0 victory over South Island United, where he won man of the match. He scored his first goal for the club in the third round of the competition, netting the only goal in a 1–0 win over Bula FC at North Harbour Stadium.

Normann started all 19 matches during Auckland FC's title-winning campaign, including the 2026 OFC Professional League final. In the final, he opened the scoring with a strike from outside the penalty area as Auckland defeated South Melbourne 2–1 at Eden Park to win the inaugural OFC Professional League title. Following the season, Normann was awarded the OFC Professional League Golden Ball as the competition's best player and was also named Auckland FC's OFC Professional League Players' Player of the Season.

==== A-League Men ====
On 15 July 2026, Normann was promoted to Auckland FC's A-League Men squad alongside fellow OFC Professional League teammate Ronan Wynne. Normann made his A-League Men debut on 17 October, coming on as a substitute in a 3–1 win over Melbourne City at Mount Smart Stadium. Normann made his full debut on 7 November in the New Zealand derby, starting in Auckland FC's 0–0 draw with Wellington Phoenix after an injury to Jake Brimmer.

== Career statistics ==
As of match played 7 November 2026.

Club	Season	League			Cup (Note: Appearance(s) in Chatham Cup)		Other		Total	
Club	Season	Division	Apps	Goals	Apps	Goals	Apps	Goals	Apps	Goals
Cal Poly	2021–22	NCAA Division I	14	0	—		—		14	0
Missouri State	2022	American Athletic Conference	15	2	—		—		15	2
Missouri State	2023	American Athletic Conference	18	1	—		—		18	1
Missouri State	2024	American Athletic Conference	15	0	—		—		15	0
Missouri State	Total		62	3	—		—		62	3
Manurewa	2025	National League	14	0	0	0	—		14	0
Western Springs	2025	National League	27	3	3	1	—		30	4
Auckland FC (OFC)	2026	OFC Professional League	19	2	—		—		19	2
Auckland FC	2026–27	A-League Men	4	0	—		1 (Note: Appearance in FIFA Intercontinental Cup)	0	5	0
Career total			126	8	3	1	1	0	130	9

== Honours ==
Western Springs

- Northern League: 2025

Auckland FC

- OFC Professional League: 2026

Individual

- OFC Player's Player of the Season: 2026
- OFC Professional League Golden Ball: 2026
