= Lars Hopp =

German football manager (born 1976)

Personal information
- Full name: Lars Christian Hopp
- Date of birth: 9 September 1976 (age 50)
- Place of birth: Kiel, Germany

Managerial career
- Years: Team
- 2005–2006: FC St. Pauli II (assistant)
- 2008: Estonia U15
- 2009–2011: Estonia U16
- 2012–2018: Estonia U17
- 2017: Estonia U19
- 2018–2019: FSV Zwickau (youth)
- 2021–2022: VfB Lübeck II
- 2021–2023: VfB Lübeck (assistant)
- 2025–2026: Vanuatu
- 2025–2026: Vanuatu United FC

Lars Christian Hopp (born 9 September 1976) is a German professional football manager who most recently was the manager of OFC Professional League club Vanuatu United and the Vanuatu national team.

== Early life ==
Hopp was born on 9 September 1976 in Kiel, Germany.

== Career ==
Ahead of the 2005–06 season, Hopp was appointed as an assistant manager of German side FC St. Pauli II. Following his stint there, he was appointed manager of the Estonia national under-17 team in 2012.

Subsequently, he was appointed as an assistant manager of German side VfB Lübeck in 2021, helping the club achieve promotion from the fourth tier to the third tier. During October 2025, he was appointed manager of OFC Professional League side Vanuatu United and the Vanuatu national team. However, it was announced on 13 January 2026, Hopp, along with General Manager Christian Happel, left their positions at Vanuatu United.
