= Jez Lofthouse =

Australian football player (born 1999)

Personal information
- Full name: Jez Lofthouse
- Date of birth: 16 October 1999 (age 27)
- Place of birth: Australia
- Position: Winger

Team information
- Current team: Wynnum Wolves

Youth career
- Sunshine Coast FC

Senior career*
Years	Team	Apps	(Gls)
2016–2017	Sunshine Coast FC	23	(7)
2018–2021	Olympic FC	99	(35)
2021–2024	Brisbane Roar	37	(2)
2022–2023	Brisbane Roar NPL	2	(0)
2025	Wynnum Wolves	21	(10)
2026	Solomon Kings	17	(7)
2026–	Wynnum Wolves	0	(0)
- * Club domestic league appearances and goals as of 4 February 2026 ‡ National team caps and goals as of 19 December 2021

Jez Lofthouse (born 16 October 1999) is an Australian soccer player who plays as a winger for NPL Queensland side Wynnum Wolves. He has previously played for Queensland Premier League (QPL) club Sunshine Coast FC, NPL Queensland clubs Olympic FC, Brisbane Roar Youth and Wynnum Wolves, and for A-League Men club Brisbane Roar.

== Honours ==
Individual

- OFC Professional League Team of the Season: 2026
