= Stéphane Auvray =

Guadeloupean footballer (born 1981)

Personal information
- Date of birth: 4 September 1981 (age 45)
- Place of birth: Les Abymes, Guadeloupe
- Height: 1.75 m (5 ft 9 in)
- Position: Midfielder

Team information
- Current team: Bula FC (head coach)

Youth career
- 1994–2002: Caen

Senior career*
Years	Team	Apps	(Gls)
1999–2001	Caen B	41	(1)
2001–2002	US Changé		
2002–2004	GSI Pontivy	58	(4)
2004–2009	Vannes	136	(1)
2009	Nîmes	12	(0)
2010–2011	Sporting Kansas City	27	(0)
2011	New York Red Bulls	6	(0)
2013	DPMM	8	(0)

International career
2007–2012	Guadeloupe	26	(2)

Managerial career
- 2019–2024: Saint Martin
- 2025–: Fiji
- 2025–: Bula FC
Medal record
Men's football
Representing Guadeloupe (as player)
Caribbean Cup
Runner-up	2010 Martinique
Third place	2008 Jamaica
Representing Fiji (as manager)
MSG Prime Minister's Cup
Winner	2026 Fiji
- * Club domestic league appearances and goals

Stéphane Auvray (born 4 September 1981) is a Guadeloupean professional football manager and former player who is currently the head coach of OFC Professional League club Bula FC and the Fiji national football team. A midfielder, he served as captain of the Guadeloupe national team.

== Club career ==
Born in Les Abymes, Guadeloupe, Auvray grew up in Saint Martin and moved on to Europe to join Stade Malherbe Caen's youth system in 1994. With Caen, he featured with the club's reserve team in the Championnat de France amateur. In 2002, Auvray signed with amateur club GSI Pontivy and spent two seasons at the club. In 2004, he joined Vannes OC and had a successful career at the club spending five seasons there and amassing over 150 appearances for the club. During his time with Vannes, he helped the club achieve promotion to the professional division Ligue 2. In 2009, Auvray joined Nîmes Olympique, but after six months departed the club for personal reasons.

In January 2010, he signed with Major League Soccer club Kansas City Wizards. He was traded to New York Red Bulls on 12 August 2011 after requesting to be transferred. New York announced in December that it would not exercise its contract option on Auvray.

In December 2012, he signed with Brunei DPMM FC together with João Moreira as a foreign player for the 2013 S.League season. However, his stay in Brunei was brief as he was released by May 2013.

== International career ==
Auvray made his major tournament debut for Guadeloupe team at the CONCACAF Gold Cup in June 2007 against Haiti. The team made it to the semi-finals but was eliminated by Mexico. Auvray renewed the experience for the 2009 CONCACAF Gold Cup, this time leading the team as captain. He scored one goal during the competition against Nicaragua. Guadeloupe qualified for the Quarter Finals but were eliminated by Costa Rica.

== Managerial career ==
Auvray was named manager of Saint Martin in 2019.

On 24 October 2025, Auvray was appointed as the head coach of OFC Professional League club Bula FC.

== Personal life ==
Auvray is married to a Trinidadian woman. His son Kaïlé Auvray is a footballer who plays for the Trinidad and Tobago national team.

== Career statistics ==
Scores and results list Guadeloupe's goal tally first, score column indicates score after each Auvray goal.

List of international goals scored by Stéphane Auvray
No.	Date	Venue	Opponent	Score	Result	Competition
1	9 July 2009	Reliant Stadium, Houston, Texas, United States	Nicaragua	1–0	2–0	2009 CONCACAF Gold Cup
2	24 October 2010	Grenada National Stadium, St. George's, Grenada	Puerto Rico	3–2	3–2	2010 Caribbean Cup qualification

== Honours ==
=== Player ===
Vannes

- Coupe de la Ligue: runner-up 2008–09

Guadeloupe

- Caribbean Cup : Runner-up, 2010; third-place, 2008

=== Manager ===
Fiji

- MSG Prime Minister's Cup : 2026

Individual

- CONCACAF Gold Cup All-Tournament Team: 2009
