= Owen Smith (footballer) =

New Zealand footballer (born 2000)

Personal information
- Full name: Owen Lee Smith
- Date of birth: 19 June 2000 (age 26)
- Place of birth: New Plymouth, New Zealand
- Height: 1.73 m (5 ft 8 in)
- Position: Midfielder

Team information
- Current team: Miramar Rangers (on loan from Vanuatu United)
- Number: 3

Youth career
- Woodleigh Aces
- New Plymouth Rangers

College career
Years	Team	Apps	(Gls)
2020–2023	Oakland Golden Grizzlies	58	(13)
2024	Western Michigan Broncos	21	(6)

Senior career*
Years	Team	Apps	(Gls)
2017–2019	Wellington United	25	(4)
2017–2019	Wellington Phoenix Reserves	22	(0)
2019	→ Lower Hutt City (loan)	5	(1)
2020	New Plymouth Rangers	10	(5)
2024	→ Kalamazoo FC (loan)	13	(7)
2025	Miramar Rangers	24	(7)
2026–	Vanuatu United	19 (Note: Appearances and goals in OFC Professional League. Vanuatu United do not compete in a domestic league.)	(4)
2026–	→ Miramar Rangers (loan)	11	(5)
- * Club domestic league appearances and goals as of 25 October 2026

Owen Lee Smith (born 19 June 2000) is a professional footballer who plays as a midfielder for National League club Miramar Rangers, on loan from OFC Professional League side Vanuatu United.

== Club career ==
=== Early career ===
Smith played his youth football for Woodleigh Aces and New Plymouth Rangers.

=== Wellington United ===
Smith started his senior career with Wellington United.

=== Wellington Phoenix ===
Until 2019, Wellington United had a 'Joint Venture' with the Wellington Phoenix academy, allowing Smith to play club football in winter and for the 'Nix in the summer. On 12 February 2017, he made his debut for the reserves in a New Zealand Football Championship match against Auckland City.

=== University in United States ===
In 2020, Smith moved over to the United States, where he attended Oakland University. He played 58 games for the Oakland Golden Grizzlies between 2021 and 2023. In 2024, Smith moved to Western Michigan University, playing 21 games for the Western Michigan Broncos. In 2024, he was loaned to Kalamazoo FC for the 2024 USL League Two season.

=== Miramar Rangers ===
Smith signed with Miramar Rangers for the 2025 season. Smith was named MVP of the 2025 New Zealand National League, as Miramar Rangers achieved their highest finish of third.

=== Vanuatu United ===
Following his form in New Zealand, Smith earned a move to OFC Professional League side Vanuatu United for the inaugural season. Vanuatu made the semi finals with Smith scoring 4 goals in 19 games.

==== Loan to Miramar Rangers ====
Following the OFC Pro League season, Smith was loaned out to Miramar Rangers for the remainder of the Central League and the National League.

== Career statistics ==
=== Club ===
As of match played on 25 October 2026.

Appearances and goals by club, season and competition
Club	Season	League			Cup		Continental		Others		Total	
Club	Season	Division	Apps	Goals	Apps	Goals	Apps	Goals	Apps	Goals	Apps	Goals
Wellington United	2017	Central Premier League	3	0	0	0	—		—		3	0
Wellington United	2018	Central Premier League	14	2	1	0	—		—		15	2
Wellington United	2019	Central Premier League	8	2	1	0	—		—		9	2
Wellington United	Total		25	4	2	0	0	0	0	0	27	4
Wellington Phoenix Reserves	2016–17	Football Championship	2	0	—		—		—		2	0
Wellington Phoenix Reserves	2017–18	Football Championship	5	0	—		—		—		5	0
Wellington Phoenix Reserves	2018–19	Football Championship	13	0	—		—		—		13	0
Wellington Phoenix Reserves	2019–20	Football Championship	2	0	—		—		—		2	0
Wellington Phoenix Reserves	Total		22	0	0	0	0	0	0	0	22	0
Lower Hutt City (loan)	2019	Central Premier League	5	1	0	0	—		—		5	1
New Plymouth Rangers	2020	Central Federation League	10	5	0	0	—		—		10	5
Kalamazoo FC (loan)	2024	USL League Two	13	7	—		—		—		13	7
Miramar Rangers	2025	National League	24	7	2	0	—		—		26	7
Vanuatu United	2026	—			—		19	4	—		19	4
Miramar Rangers (loan)	2026	National League	11	5	2	0	—		—		13	5
Career total			110	29	6	0	19	4	0	0	135	33

== Honours ==
Individual

- National League MVP: 2025
- National League Team of the Season: 2025
- OFC Professional League Team of the Season: 2026
