= Alex Saniel =

Vanuatuan footballer

Personal information
- Full name: Alex Jason Saniel
- Date of birth: 8 November 1996 (age 30)
- Place of birth: Port Vila, Vanuatu
- Height: 1.86 m (6 ft 1 in)
- Position: Forward

Team information
- Current team: Vanuatu United FC
- Number: 7

Youth career
- –2013: Teouma Academy

Senior career*
Years	Team	Apps	(Gls)
2012–2013	Spirit 08		
2013–2014	Yatel		
2014–2015	Spirit 08		
2015–2016	Fencibles United		
2016	Ifira Black Bird		
2017	Fencibles United		
2017–2018	Shepherds United		
2019	Papatoetoe AFC		
2019–2020	Lautoka	3	(3)
2020	Franklin United		
2021–2025	Suva	17	(8)
2026–	Vanuatu United FC	11	(6)

International career^{‡}
2013	Vanuatu U17	5	(2)
2014	Vanuatu U20	5	(1)
2017–	Vanuatu	24	(1)
Medal record
Men's football
Representing Vanuatu
OFC Nations Cup
Runner-up	2024 Fiji/Vanuatu
OFC U-20 Championship
Runner-up	2014 Fiji
Pacific Mini Games
Gold medal – first place	2017 Vanuatu
MSG Prime Minister's Cup
Winner	2025 Papua New Guinea
Third place	2023 New Caledonia
- * Club domestic league appearances and goals ‡ National team caps and goals as of 1 February 2026

Alex Saniel (born 8 November 1996) is a Vanuatuan footballer who plays as a forward for Vanuatu United FC and the Vanuatu national team.

== Club career ==
Saniel started his career with the Teouma Academy, the national academy of Vanuatu. After stints with Yatel and Spirit 08 he went to New Zealand to play with the Fencibles United. In the end of 2016 after the season with Fencibles he returned home, where he immediately joined Ifira Black Bird for the Super League. In 2017 he returned to the Fencibles with whom he won the 2017 Lotto Sport Italia NRFL Division 2. After that he joined Shepherds United in August 2017 to make a chance for the Vanuatu national football team. In 2019 he played for Papatoetoe AFC in Lotto Sport Italia NRFL Conference League. He also defended Fijian club Lautoka in 2019 Pacific Cup. In November 2019, it was announced that Alex Saniel would play for Franklin United in 2020.

In January 2020 he joined Fijian club Lautoka. In 2021 he moved to Suva.

Saniel joined the OFC Pro League side Vanuatu United FC in 2026, where he scored the opening goal in the new era of professional Oceanian football.

== National team ==
In 2017 Saniel was called up for the Vanuatu national football team. He made his debut on November 23, 2017, in a 1–0 loss against Estonia when he played the whole 90 minutes.

=== International goals ===
Scores and results list Vanuatu's goal tally first.

No	Date	Venue	Opponent	Score	Result	Competition
1.	2 December 2017	Port Vila Municipal Stadium, Port Vila, Vanuatu	New Caledonia	1–0	2–1	2017 Pacific Mini Games
2.	6 June 2026	Freshwater Stadium, Port Vila, Vanuatu	Fiji	1–0	2–1	Friendly
3.	9 June 2026	Freshwater Stadium, Port Vila, Vanuatu	Fiji	2–2	2–2	Friendly

== Honours ==
Vanuatu

- OFC Nations Cup: Runner-up, 2024
- Pacific Mini Games: Gold Medalist, 2017
- MSG Prime Minister's Cup: 2025; 3rd place, 2023

Vanuatu U20

- OFC U-20 Championship: Runner-up, 2014

Individual

- OFC Professional League Golden Boot: 2026
- OFC Professional League Team of the Season: 2026
