= Joseph Athale =

New Caledonian footballer (born 1995)

Personal information
- Full name: Joseph Georges Athale
- Date of birth: 11 July 1995 (age 31)
- Place of birth: Ouvéa Island, Loyalty Islands Province, New Caledonia
- Height: 1.70 m (5 ft 7 in)
- Position: Midfielder

Team information
- Current team: Tahiti United FC

Senior career*
Years	Team	Apps	(Gls)
2013–2015	Gaïtcha		
2015–2016	Lössi		
2016	Wetr		
2016–2019	Magenta		
2019–2022	Hienghène Sport		
2023–2026	Olympique Saint-Quentin		
2026–	Tahiti United FC	1	(0)

International career^{‡}
2014	New Caledonia U20	4	(3)
2015–	New Caledonia U23	8	(0)
2016–	New Caledonia	19	(3)
Medal record
Men's football
Representing New Caledonia
Pacific Games
Gold medal – first place	2015 Papua New Guinea
- * Club domestic league appearances and goals as of 30 May 2016 ‡ National team caps and goals as of 14 November 2024

Joseph Georges Athale (born 11 July 1995) is a New Caledonian footballer who plays as a midfielder for Tahiti club Tahiti United FC. He made his debut for the national team on 25 March 2016 in their 1–0 loss against Vanuatu and has also represented his nation in beach soccer.

== Career ==
He joined Hienghène Sport in 2019 and scored for the club against ASPV Strasbourg in the seventh round of the Coup de France. He also appeared in the 2019 FIFA Club World Cup, playing a full match against Al Sadd.

In January 2023, Athale moved to the French Metrople, signing for Olympique Saint-Quentin.

== Honours ==
New Caledonia U-23

- Pacific Games: Gold Medalist, 2015

Individual

- OFC Professional League Team of the Season: 2026 (substitute)
