= Atkin Kaua =

Solomon Islands footballer (born 1996)

Personal information
- Full name: Atkin Kaua
- Date of birth: 4 April 1996 (age 30)
- Place of birth: Solomon Islands
- Position: Midfielder

Team information
- Current team: Solomon Kings
- Number: 6

Youth career
- Laugu United
- Tasman United

Senior career*
| Years | Team | Apps | (Gls) |
| 2014–2015 | Western United | | |
| 2015–2016 | Canterbury United | | |
| 2016–2018 | Marist | | |
| 2018–2019 | Solomon Warriors | | |
| 2020 | Nasinu | | |
| 2020 | Laugu United | | |
| 2021 | Rewa | | |
| 2021 | Solomon Warriors | | |
| 2022 | Wynnum Wolves FC | | |
| 2023 | Rewa | | |
| 2023–2026 | Laugu United | | |
| 2026– | Solomon Kings | 1 | (0) |

International career^{‡}
| 2014 | Solomon Islands U20 | 5 | (3) |
| 2016– | Solomon Islands | 47 | (6) |
Medal record
Representing Solomon Islands
Pacific Games
| Silver medal – second place | 2023 Solomon Islands |
Pacific Mini Games
| Bronze medal – third place | 2017 Vanuatu |
MSG Prime Minister's Cup
| Winner | 2023 New Caledonia |
| Third place | 2024 Solomon Islands |
- * Club domestic league appearances and goals as of 24 March 2018 ‡ National team caps and goals as of 16:04, 12 February 2025 (UTC)

Atkin Kaua (born 4 April 1996) is a Solomon Islands footballer who plays as a midfielder for the Solomon Kings. He made his debut for the national team on 5 October 2016, in their 3–0 loss against New Caledonia.

== Club career ==
Kaua was educated at Nelson College and played college football in New Zealand. In 2018 he was named in the Oceanian's Eleven Series as one of the 11 biggest talents in Oceania.

== International career ==
=== International goals ===
Scores and results list the Solomon Islands' goal tally first.

| No. | Date | Venue | Opponent | Score | Result | Competition |
|---|---|---|---|---|---|---|
| 1. | 9 June 2017 | Lawson Tama Stadium, Honiara, Solomon Islands | Papua New Guinea | 1–0 | 3–2 | 2018 FIFA World Cup qualification |
| 2. | 12 December 2017 | Korman Stadium, Port Vila, Vanuatu | New Caledonia | 1–0 | 1–0 | 2017 Pacific Mini Games |
| 3. | 29 August 2018 | Estádio Campo Desportivo, Taipa, Macau | Macau | 2–0 | 4–1 | Friendly |
| 4. | 8 July 2019 | National Soccer Stadium, Apia, Samoa | Tuvalu | 9–0 | 13–0 | 2019 Pacific Games |
| 5. | 17 March 2022 | Al-Arabi Stadium, Doha, Qatar | Cook Islands | 1–0 | 2–0 | 2022 FIFA World Cup qualification |

== Honours ==
Solomon Islands

- Pacific Games: Silver Medalist, 2023
- Pacific Mini Games: Bronze Medalist, 2017
- MSG Prime Minister's Cup: 2023; 3rd place, 2024
