= Tevita Waranaivalu =

Fijian footballer

Personal information
- Full name: Ratu Tevita Waranaivalu
- Date of birth: 16 September 1995 (age 31)
- Place of birth: Nausori, Fiji
- Height: 1.72 m (5 ft 8 in)
- Position: Attacking midfielder

Team information
- Current team: Tahiti United

Youth career
- Rewa

Senior career*
Years	Team	Apps	(Gls)
2013–2018	Rewa		
2018–2022	Suva		
2022-2025	Rewa		
2026-	Tahiti United	1	(0)

International career^{‡}
2014	Fiji U-20	5	(0)
2015–2016	Fiji U-23	9	(1)
2015–	Fiji	28	(3)
- Fiji Futsal
Medal record
Men's football
Representing Fiji
OFC U-20 Championship
Winner	2014 Fiji
Pacific Games
Bronze medal – third place	2023 Solomon Islands
Pacific Mini Games
Silver medal – second place	2017 Vanuatu
MSG Prime Minister's Cup
Winner	2026 Fiji
Third place	2022 Vanuatu
- * Club domestic league appearances and goals as of 9 January 2026 ‡ National team caps and goals as of 8 September 2024

Ratu Tevita Waranaivalu (born 16 September 1995) is a Fijian footballer who plays as an attacking midfielder for Tahiti United in the OFC Professional League.

== Early career ==
Waranaivalu started playing football at an early age and was a football player for his high school team Saraswati College in Nausori. He came up through the Rewa FC youth system and made his first-team debut at the age of 18 in 2013. In January 2018 he moved to Suva.

== International career ==
Waranaivalu was a member of Fiji's U-20 national team at the 2015 FIFA U-20 World Cup in New Zealand. It was the first time that Fiji had qualified for a FIFA event. During the tournament, he played all in three games, including in the historical 3–0 victory over Honduras. Waranaivalu made his debut for the Fiji national football team in a 5–0 victory against Tonga on 19 August 2015. He was also part of the Fijian team at the 2016 OFC Nations Cup. On 16 July 2016, Waranaivalu was named in Fiji's 18-man squad for the 2016 Summer Olympics in Rio de Janeiro.

== International goals ==
No.	Date	Venue	Opponent	Score	Result	Competition
1.	27 August 2015	Prince Charles Park, Nadi, Fiji	American Samoa	4–0	6–0	Friendly
2.	24 March 2022	Grand Hamad Stadium, Doha, Qatar	Papua New Guinea	1–1	1–2	2022 FIFA World Cup qualification
3.	2 September 2024	HFC Bank Stadium, Suva, Fiji	Solomon Islands	1–0	1–0	Friendly

== Honours ==
Fiji

- Pacific Games bronze medal: 2023
- Pacific Mini Games silver medal: 2017
- MSG Prime Minister's Cup: 2026; third place: 2022

Fiji U20

- OFC U-20 Championship: 2014
