= 2026 OFC Professional League leaders play-off group =

International football club competition in Oceania

The 2026 OFC Professional League Leaders play-off group was played from 6 to 12 May 2026.

== League table ==
Pos	Team	Pld	W	D	L	GF	GA	GD	Pts	Qualification
1	(Australia) South Melbourne	3	3	0	0	10	5	+5	9	Qualification for semi-finals
2	(New Zealand) Auckland FC	3	2	0	1	8	4	+4	6	Qualification for semi-finals
3	(New Zealand) South Island United	3	1	0	2	5	9	−4	3	Qualification for semi-finals
4	(Fiji) Bula FC	3	0	0	3	2	7	−5	0	Qualification for qualification play-off

Source: OFC Pro League
Rules for classification: 1) Points; 2) Goal difference; 3) Goals scored; 4) Head to head; 5) Head to head goal difference; 6) Head to head goals scored; 7) Disciplinary record; 8) Coin toss

== Results ==
Home team	Score	Away team
Bula FC (Fiji)	0–1	(New Zealand) South Island United
Auckland FC (New Zealand)	1–2	(Australia) South Melbourne
Auckland FC (New Zealand)	2–0	(Fiji) Bula FC
South Melbourne (Australia)	4–2	(New Zealand) South Island United
South Melbourne (Australia)	4–2	(Fiji) Bula FC
Auckland FC (New Zealand)	5–2	(New Zealand) South Island United

== Matches ==
The fixtures were announced on 22 April 2026.

6 May 2026
15:00 (NZDT)

Bula FC (Fiji)	0–1	(New Zealand) South Island United
	(OFC) (Report)	Feutz 90+3'

Mount Smart Stadium, Auckland
Attendance: 257
Referee: Ben Aukwai (Solomon Islands)
6 May 2026
19:00 (NZDT)

Auckland FC (New Zealand)	1–2	(Australia) South Melbourne
Zoricich 41'	(OFC) (Report)	Eliopoulos 21'; Pasquali 23'

Mount Smart Stadium, Auckland
Attendance: 426
Referee: Campbell-Kirk Kawana-Waugh (New Zealand)

9 May 2026
14:30 (NZDT)

Auckland FC (New Zealand)	2–0	(Fiji) Bula FC
Bidois 7'; O'Leary 36'	(OFC) (Report)

Eden Park, Auckland
Attendance: 754
Referee: Cory Mills (New Zealand)
9 May 2026
18:30 (NZDT)

South Melbourne (Australia)	4–2	(New Zealand) South Island United
Cocks 22'; Mikkola 26'; Rogerson 34' (o.g.); Swibel 45+2'	(OFC) (Report)	Feutz 17'; Fay 80'

Eden Park, Auckland
Attendance: 227
Referee: Veer Singh (Fiji)

12 May 2026
15:00 (NZDT)

South Melbourne (Australia)	4–2	(Fiji) Bula FC
Pope 12'; Mikkola 34' (pen.); Mesourouni 36'; Lampard 57'	(OFC) (Report)	Afazal 19'; Krishna 79'

Eden Park, Auckland
Attendance: 228
Referee: Cory Mills (New Zealand)
12 May 2026
19:00 (NZDT)

Auckland FC (New Zealand)	5–2	(New Zealand) South Island United
Tade 38'; Burns 58', 67'; Krayem 62' (o.g.); Prins 86'	(OFC) (Report)	Yoo 50'; Grover 57'

Eden Park, Auckland
Attendance: 380
Referee: Anna-Marie Keighley (New Zealand)
