= Tahiti United FC =

Men's soccer club in French Polynesia

Tahiti United
- Full name: AS Vénus Professional Football Club Tahiti United
- Founded: 20 December 2024; 23 months ago
- Ground: Stade Pater Te Hono Nui; Pīraʻe, Tahiti
- Owner: AS Vénus
- Coach: Samuel Garcia
- League: OFC Professional League
- 2026: OFC Pro League: 7th
| Home colours | Away colours |

AS Vénus Professional Football Club Tahiti United, commonly known as Tahiti United, is a men's professional football club based in Pīraʻe, Tahiti. Founded as the professional section of French Polynesian club AS Vénus, it commenced playing in the OFC Professional League (OFCPL) 2026 season.

== History ==
Tahiti United FC was founded in December 2024, as part of AS Vénus' bid into the OFC Professional League (OFCPL), competing against rival bids from A.S. Pirae and A.S. Tefana. They marketed the bid as an attempt to build a club representing "all Polynesians", and received the endorsement of the Tahitian Football Federation and Government of French Polynesia. The bid successfully resulted in the club being chosen as one of eight charter members of the OFCPL in August 2025. The league determines the Oceania representative for the FIFA Intercontinental Cup and the FIFA Club World Cup.

== Stadium ==
Tahiti United FC's intended home ground is Stade Pater Te Hono Nui in Pīraʻe. However, it will not be used until the 2027 Pacific Games.

== Sponsorships ==
| Period | Kit manufacturer | Shirt sponsor | Short sponsor(s) |
|---|---|---|---|
| 2026– | Adidas | Okipik | Tahiti Sign, Hyundai , Airwell, Rexona |

== Players ==
=== First team squad ===
As of 22 November 2026

Note: Flags indicate national team as defined under FIFA eligibility rules; some limited exceptions apply. Players may hold more than one non-FIFA nationality.

| No. | Pos. | Nation | Player |
|---|---|---|---|
| 1 | GK | CAN | Jackson Gardner |
| 2 | DF | TAH | Mauri Heitaa |
| 3 | DF | TAH | Kévin Barbe-Garcia |
| 4 | DF | TAH | Kali Lenoir |
| 5 | DF | TAH | Pothin Poma |
| 6 | MF | TAH | Terai Bremond |
| 7 | FW | TAH | Mathis Lacan |
| 8 | MF | TAH | Roonui Tehau |
| 9 | DF | TAH | Matatia Paama |
| 10 | MF | TAH | Teaonui Tehau (captain) |
| 11 | FW | TAH | Manuarii Shan |

| No. | Pos. | Nation | Player |
|---|---|---|---|
| 12 | FW | FIJ | Tevita Waranaivalu |
| 13 | FW | TAH | Franck Papaura |
| 14 | MF | TAH | Cédovan Taniel |
| 15 | FW | NCL | Germain Haewegene |
| 16 | GK | TAH | Jackson Teamotuaitau |
| 17 | DF | TAH | Bradley Ruiz |
| 19 | DF | NCL | Joseph Athale |
| 20 | MF | TAH | Mana Teniau |
| 21 | FW | TAH | Matéo Degrumelle |
| 22 | GK | TAH | Niuhau Firiapu |
| — | GK | FRA | Loan Marin |
| — | FW | TAH | Lucas Albert |

== Coaching staff ==
=== Technical officials ===
| Position | Name | Ref. |
|---|---|---|
| Head coach | (French Polynesia) Samuel Garcia | |
| Assistant coach | (French Polynesia) Moise Tetuanui | |
| Strength and conditioning coach | (French Polynesia) Léo Michelet | |
| Goalkeeping coach | | |
| Physiotherapist | | |

=== Management ===
| Position | Name | Ref. |
|---|---|---|
| President | (French Polynesia) Tenae Tepa | |
| General manager | (French Polynesia) Temauiarii Crolas | |
| Marketing manager | (French Polynesia) Krystal Lorphelin | |
| Communications manager | (French Polynesia) Matthieu Fontaine | |
| Liaison officer | (French Polynesia) Nohonani Tepa | |

== OFC Professional League results ==
| Season | OFC Professional League | | | | | | | | Position | Playoff | Finals | Top goalscorer(s) | |
| Season | Pld | W | L | D | GF | GA | GD | Pts | Position | Playoff | Finals | Name(s) | Goals |
|---|---|---|---|---|---|---|---|---|---|---|---|---|---|
| 2026 | 14 | 4 | 5 | 5 | 20 | 28 | −8 | 17 | 6th | 3rd | Challengers' play-off group | (French Polynesia) Teaonui Tehau | 7 |

== See also ==
- List of football clubs in French Polynesia
- List of top-division football clubs in OFC countries
- Tahiti national football team
