= Solomon Kings FC =

Solomon Kings
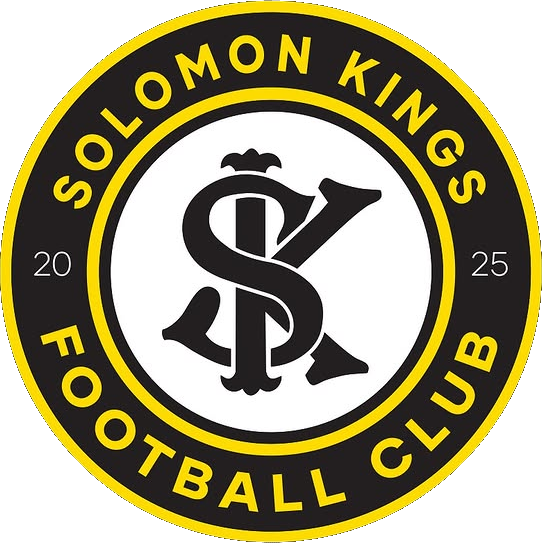
- Full name: Solomon Kings Football Club
- Nickname: The Kings
- Short name: SKFC
- Founded: 2025; 1 year ago
- Ground: National Stadium
- Capacity: 10,000
- Chairman: Donald Marahare
- Manager: Ben Cahn
- League: OFC Professional League
- 2026: OFC Pro League: 6th
- Website: Website

Solomon Kings Football Club is a professional association football club based in the city of Honiara on the Solomon Islands. They began playing in the inaugural season of the OFC Professional League (OFCPL).

== History ==
In February 2025, the Oceania Football Confederation put out a call for applications for clubs wishing to participate in the inaugural season of the OFC Professional League (OFCPL) in 2026. At least one club from the Solomon Islands had expressed interest when the process began. Clubs had until June 2025 to submit their applications to the confederation for consideration with eight slots available for clubs from around Oceania and Australia available for the first season. In early July 2025, Jeremiah Manele, Prime Minister of Solomon Islands, announced that the national government, Solomon Islands Football Federation, and Australian club Wynnum Wolves had created a partnership to create the Solomons' first professional club, Solomon Kings, with the goal of playing in the region's new professional league. The club was expected to improve health and well-being in young people; develop the sport in the Solomon Islands; and provide pathways to higher leagues, including to Borussia Dortmund through Wynnum Wolves' partnership. Wynnum Wolves had been connected with football in the Solomon Islands since the mid-1990s when the club traveled to the nation to tour and play exhibition matches. At the time of announcement, Solomon Kings was one of only two that had publicly announced their desire to join the league, along with Wellington Phoenix.

Solomon Kings's application was the only inquiry submitted to the OFC from the Solomon Islands. However, the club would still need to demonstrate that it met all of the confederation's professional club licensing requirements. On 29 August 2025, the OFC announced its list of eight "preferred" clubs which had tentatively been accepted into the league. The clubs would have to pass a final stage of the licensing and compliance process before the season kicked off in January 2026 to receive final approval. Prior to the announcement, newly announced chairman Don Marahare indicated that the club would need financial assistance and planned to reach out to the governments of Australia and the China for support. On 28 October 2025, It was revealed that the Solomon Kings were accepted and were listed among the final 8 teams that will play in the OFC Pro League.

== Identity ==
The club's name is an homage to biblical King Solomon for whom the country is named. The club's colors of yellow and black mirror its partner club Wynnum Wolves.

== Sponsorships ==
Period	Kit manufacturer	Shirt sponsor	Shorts sponsor(s)
2026–	Stanno	Solomon Ports	

== League ==
Solomon Kings participates as one of eight founding clubs in the OFC Professional League, which began on 17 January 2026. The league will determine the Oceania representative for the FIFA Intercontinental Cup and the FIFA Club World Cup.

== Stadium ==
The club plays in the National Stadium (Solomon Islands).

== Players ==
=== First-team squad ===
As of 16 October 2026

Note: Flags indicate national team as defined under FIFA eligibility rules; some limited exceptions apply. Players may hold more than one non-FIFA nationality.

No.	Pos.	Nation	Player
1	GK	SOL	Philip Mango
2	DF	SOL	David Supa
4	DF	SOL	Gordon Iro
5	DF	SOL	Javin Wae
6	MF	SOL	Atkin Kaua
7	FW	SOL	Raphael Lea'i
8	DF	SOL	Clivert Sam
9	FW	SOL	Bobby Leslie
10	FW	AUS	Jez Lofthouse
11	FW	SOL	Rooney Riugaimae
12	GK	SOL	Junior Petua
13	MF	SOL	Danford Fiumae
14	DF	SOL	Junior David
15	MF	SOL	William Komasi

No.	Pos.	Nation	Player
16	FW	SOL	Martin Koto
17	FW	SOL	Don Keana
18	FW	SOL	Clifford Fafale
19	FW	SOL	Junior Fordney
21	FW	SOL	Barrie Limoki
23	GK	SOL	Eric Wanega
24	DF	AUS	Jacob Krayem
26	MF	SOL	Hudson Oreinima
27	MF	JPN	Sota Higashide
29	DF	SOL	Jayroll Patty
30	GK	SOL	Michael Laulae
—	FW	SOL	Gagame Feni
—	MF	SOL	Ben Fox

== Coaching staff ==
=== Technical officials ===
Position	Name	Ref.
Head coach	(England) Ben Cahn	
Assistant coach	(Australia) Richard Greer	
Strength and conditioning coach		
Goalkeeping coach		
Physiotherapist		

=== Management ===
Position	Name	Ref.
Chairman	(Solomon Islands) Donald Marahare	

== OFC Professional League results ==
Season	OFC Professional League								Position	Playoff	Finals	Top goalscorer(s)	
Season	Pld	W	L	D	GF	GA	GD	Pts	Position	Playoff	Finals	Name(s)	Goals
2026	14	5	3	6	14	21	−7	18	5th	2nd	Challengers' play-off group	(Australia) Jez Lofthouse	7
