= Bula FC (Fiji) =

Men's soccer club in Fiji

Bula
- Full name: Bula Football Club
- Nickname: Bula Warriors
- Founded: 2025
- Ground: HFC Bank Stadium; Suva, Fiji
- Capacity: 15,446
- Coordinates: 18.1494°S 178.4494°E
- Owner: Fiji Football Association (majority)
- Chairman: Marc McElrath
- Coach: Stéphane Auvray
- League: OFC Professional League
- 2026: OFC Pro League: 5th
- Website: bulafc.com
Home colours	Away colours

Bula Football Club, also known as Bula FC, is a men's professional association football club based in Fiji. It first competed in the OFC Professional League (OFCPL) as one of the founding members for the inaugural 2026 season.

== History ==
Fiji’s Bula FC made history as one of the eight preferred clubs confirmed for the inaugural OFC Professional League, kicking off on January 10, 2026.

Bula FC is Fiji’s first professional football club, built on the deep roots of a game that has been part of Fiji's national story since 1938. Football in Fiji was a way for the indentured labourers and the indigenous iTaukei to express identity and unity, bringing together people from different backgrounds and creating a shared passion for football.

Over time, football became popular in most of the Fiji communities including Rotumans, Rabi Islanders, Solomon Islanders, Part Europeans, and others who call Fiji home. The patterns, colours, and symbols of the Bula FC brand represents the land and the people of Fiji.

== Colours and badge ==
In October 2025, the club unveiled their new identity consisting of a new name and badge. The badge depicts traditional Fijian symbols such as the ibe mat and magimagi rope.

== Sponsorships ==
Period	Kit manufacturer	Shirt sponsor	Short sponsor(s)
2026–	RK21	Extra Supermarket	McDonald's (left) iXCEL Financial Solutions (right)

== Organization ==
Bula FC is majority-owned by the Fiji Football Association (Fiji FA). While it shares the nickname of the Fiji national football team, it intends to operate independently from the Fiji FA – similarly to the relationship between the Fijian Drua of Super Rugby and the Fiji Rugby Union. The Fiji FA is seeking financial support for Bula FC from the Government of Fiji, who had helped fund the Fijian Drua and the NSWRL's Kaiviti Silktails.

== League ==
Bula FC participates as one of eight founding clubs in the OFC Professional League, which began on 17 January 2026. The league determines the Oceania representative for the FIFA Intercontinental Cup and the FIFA Club World Cup.

== Stadium ==
The club plays in the HFC Bank Stadium.

== Coaching staff ==
=== Technical officials ===
Position	Name	Ref.
Head coach	(Guadeloupe) Stéphane Auvray	
Assistant coach	(Fiji) Marika Rodu	
Strength and conditioning coach	(India) Joshua Raj	
Goalkeeping coach	(Fiji) Sanaila Waqanicakau	
Physiotherapist	(India) Noel Augustine	

=== Management ===
Position	Name	Ref.
Chairman	(Fiji) Marc McElrath	
Chief Executive Officer	(Fiji) Anushil Kumar	
Chief Commercial Officer	(Fiji) Naziah Ali Krishna	

== Players ==
=== First-team squad ===
As of 3 November 2026

Note: Flags indicate national team as defined under FIFA eligibility rules; some limited exceptions apply. Players may hold more than one non-FIFA nationality.

No.	Pos.	Nation	Player
1	GK	NZL	Matthew Foord
2	MF	FIJ	Delon Shankar
3	DF	NZL	Adam Supyk
4	DF	FIJ	Gabriele Matanisiga
5	DF	FIJ	Scott Wara
6	DF	FIJ	Semi Nabenu
7	MF	FIJ	Zacariah Harang
8	MF	FIJ	Thomas Dunn
9	FW	FIJ	Setareki Hughes
10	FW	TTO	Kaïlé Auvray
12	DF	FIJ	Sterling Vasconcellos
13	DF	FIJ	Mohammed Ayman
14	MF	FIJ	Maikah Dau
15	MF	FIJ	Josaia Sela
16	MF	NZL	Fergus Gillion
17	DF	FIJ	Ryan Naresh
18	FW	FIJ	Veleni Rasorewa
19	MF	FIJ	Nabil Begg
20	GK	FIJ	Melvin Prakash
21	FW	FIJ	Roy Krishna (captain)

No.	Pos.	Nation	Player
22	GK	FIJ	Joji Vuakaca
23	DF	FIJ	Filipe Baravilala
24	DF	FIJ	Ivan Kumar
25	FW	FIJ	Christopher Wasasala
26	MF	FIJ	Asivorosi Rabo
27	FW	FIJ	Ibraheem Afazal
29	FW	FIJ	Solayman Mohammed
—	GK	NZL	Jack de Groot
—	GK	FIJ	Isoa Latui
—	GK	FIJ	Jerome Narayan
—	DF	AUS	Michael Boffey
—	DF	NCL	Josué Welepane
—	DF	FIJ	Isimeli Gavidi (youth)
—	DF	FIJ	Jone Loga (youth)
—	MF	CIV	Souleymane Koné
—	MF	FIJ	Abdullah Kairati
—	MF	NCL	Morgan Mathelon
—	MF	NCL	Pierre Iékawé
—	MF	FIJ	Tito Bai (youth)
—	FW	BRA	Willian Medina

== Seasonal results (OFC) ==
Season	OFC Professional League								Position	Playoff	Finals	Top goalscorer(s)	
Season	Pld	W	L	D	GF	GA	GD	Pts	Position	Playoff	Finals	Name(s)	Goals
2026	14	6	3	5	14	15	−1	21	3rd	4th	Qualification play-off	(Fiji) Roy Krishna	3

== See also ==
- List of football clubs in Fiji
- List of top-division football clubs in OFC countries
