= Vanuatu United FC =

Men's soccer club in Vanuatu

Vanuatu United
- Full name: Vanuatu United Football Club
- Nickname: The Chiefs
- Founded: 2025; 1 year ago
- Ground: Freshwater Stadium
- Capacity: 6500
- Owner: Vanuatu Football Federation
- General manager: Christian Happel
- Head coach: Albert Riera
- League: OFC Professional League
- 2026: OFC Pro League: 4th

Vanuatu United Football Club, commonly known as Vanuatu United, is a men's professional association football club based in Vanuatu which competes in the OFC Professional League (OFCPL). Vanuatu United is also one of the eight founding clubs competing in the inaugural 2026 season.

== History ==
Vanuatu FC was selected in August 2025 as one of the OFC Professional League's (OFCPL) eight charter clubs. The club plans to commence play in the league's inaugural 2026 season. On 11 September, the club was officially renamed to Vanuatu United FC stating that the name better reflects the clubs ambition to unite all football fans across the country. The league determines the Oceania representative for the FIFA Intercontinental Cup and the FIFA Club World Cup.

== Stadium ==
The club plays its home matches at the Freshwater Stadium.

== Sponsorships ==
Period	Kit manufacturer	Shirt sponsor	Other sponsor(s)
2026–	Football Central	None	Vanuatu Beverage

== Players ==
=== First team squad ===
As of 3 November 2026

Note: Flags indicate national team as defined under FIFA eligibility rules; some limited exceptions apply. Players may hold more than one non-FIFA nationality.

No.	Pos.	Nation	Player
2	DF	VAN	Edward Roqara
3	DF	VAN	Jason Thomas
4	DF	AUS	Hassan Ramazani
6	MF	VAN	Kalfter Kaltack
7	FW	VAN	Alex Saniel
9	FW	NZL	Luke Flowerdew
10	FW	NZL	Otto Ingham
11	FW	VAN	Kathy Iamak
13	FW	VAN	Azariah Soromon
14	DF	VAN	Michel Coulon (captain)
15	DF	PNG	Raymond Diho
16	DF	VAN	Raoul Coulon
18	MF	USA	William Cardona
19	FW	VAN	Tony Kaltak

No.	Pos.	Nation	Player
21	MF	NZL	Owen Smith
22	GK	VAN	Dgen Leo
23	GK	VAN	Kaloran Firiam
—	GK	DEN	William Tønning
—	DF	VAN	Jeffrey Tasso
—	DF	VAN	Jack Wanemut
—	DF	VAN	Henry Namatak
—	DF	VAN	Semici Kaltack
—	MF	VAN	Claude Aru
—	MF	VAN	Andrew Malakai
—	FW	VAN	Joe Moses
—	FW	VAN	Bong Kalo
—		VAN	Ala Leo Russell

== Club officials ==
=== Technical officials ===
Position	Name	Ref.
Head coach	(Germany) Lars Hopp	
Assistant coach	(Vanuatu) Richard Iwai	

=== Management ===
Position	Name	Ref.
General manager	(Germany) Christian Happel	

== OFC Professional League results ==
Season	OFC Professional League								Position	Playoff	Finals	Top goalscorer(s)	
Season	Pld	W	L	D	GF	GA	GD	Pts	Position	Playoff	Finals	Name(s)	Goals
2026	14	3	4	7	20	25	−5	13	7th	1st	Semifinals	(Vanuatu) Alex Saniel	11

== See also ==
- List of football clubs in Vanuatu
- List of top-division football clubs in OFC countries
- Vanuatu national football team
