= OFC Professional League =

Men's association football league in Oceania

- Organiser(s): OFC
- Founded: 2019
- Region: Oceania
- Teams: 8 (league stage)
- Qualifier for: FIFA Club World Cup; FIFA Intercontinental Cup
- Current champions: (New Zealand) Auckland FC (1st title)
- Most championships: (New Zealand) Auckland FC (1 title)
- Website: ofcproleague.com
- 2027 OFC Professional League

The OFC Professional League (OFCPL; also known as the OFC Pro League) is the first fully professional association football league organised by the Oceania Football Confederation (OFC), debuting in the 2026 season. The champion qualifies for the annual FIFA Intercontinental Cup. The league also serves as a pathway to the quadrennial FIFA Club World Cup.

The Pro League was founded in 2019 as a part of efforts to foster professionalism in Oceanian football. It initially planned to commence in 2021, but was delayed by the COVID-19 pandemic in Oceania. Expressions of interest were received ahead of the selection of the league's eight charter clubs in August 2025. Roster concept is primarily built upon Oceanian players, featuring marquee players from other regions.

== History ==
In 2019, the Oceania Football Confederation formed a task force to determine the viability of a professional football league for the Oceania region. The league was initially expected to begin play in 2021. However, progress was delayed due to the COVID-19 pandemic. In November 2022 in Doha, Qatar, the OFC Executive Committee voted to move forward with the league, initially targeting a 2025 launch. The launch was later postponed to 2026 to allow clubs time to transition to fully professional status. In January 2024, the OFC announced plans to implement the VAR system for the league's first season. The league's formation and development operated on the following timeline:

- End of June 2025 – Conclusion of the club application process.
- August 2025 – OFC Licensing Committee submits recommendations to the OFC Executive Committee.
- September 2025 – Final approval and issuance of licenses to the eight selected clubs.

On 29 January 2025, the OFC held a meeting at its headquarters in Auckland, New Zealand to discuss the league with potential New Zealand-based clubs. The OFC also opened expressions of interest for clubs across the region to participate in the inaugural season. Additionally, Australian-based clubs were invited to participate. By February 2025, initial interest had been received from clubs in Fiji, Solomon Islands, Australia, and New Zealand. Among the clubs that submitted expressions of interest to the OFC were Eastern United and Sunshine Coast Fire from Australia, Wellington Phoenix and Nelson Suburbs from New Zealand, Bougainville, Port Moresby, and Lae City from Papua New Guinea, and Real Kakamora from the Solomon Islands. The participants in the league's inaugural season were announced in August 2025.

On 29 October 2025, OFC held a launch event for the OFC Pro League, where the competition logo and trophy were announced.

Wellington Phoenix, despite being one of Oceania’s most established professional sides, was notably excluded at the licensing stage. The club considered contesting the decision through legal channels.

== Format ==
The competition runs from January to May. It features five circuit rounds held across various locations in a double round-robin format, with each team playing a minimum of 14 matches.

Following the regular season, teams are split into two playoff groups:

- Leaders Playoff Group – The top four teams compete for three semi-final berths.
- Challengers Playoff Group – The bottom four teams compete for the last semi-final berth.

The semi-finals and grand final are single-leg matches. The league will also serve as Oceania's qualifying pathway for the FIFA Intercontinental Cup and the FIFA Club World Cup, apart from South Melbourne (who cannot qualify for other competitions as they are based in Australia, which is part of the Asian Football Confederation).

== Clubs ==
Locations of clubs competing in the 2026 season.

For its inaugural season in 2026, eight clubs were selected to compete in the OFC Professional League, including four from Melanesia, three from Polynesia, and one from Australia.

Auckland FC, (Note: With a restriction on players not signed to A-League contracts) Christchurch United (competing under the moniker South Island United), PNG Hekari and South Melbourne were pre-existing clubs, while Bula FC, Solomon Kings, Tahiti United, and Vanuatu United were new clubs created for the competition. South Melbourne, an Australian club under the jurisdiction of the Asian Football Confederation, was considered a fully expatriated member, though Solomon Kings is partly owned by another Australian club, Wynnum Wolves.

List of OFC Professional League teams (2026)
Team	City	Country	Home ground	Cap.
Auckland FC	Auckland	New Zealand	Eden Park	50,000
Bula FC	Suva	Fiji	Buckhurst Park	15,446
PNG Hekari	Port Moresby	Papua New Guinea	PNG Football Stadium	14,800
Solomon Kings	Honiara	Solomon Islands	National Stadium	10,000
South Island United	Christchurch	New Zealand	Te Kaha	30,000
South Melbourne	Melbourne	Australia	Lakeside Stadium	12,000
Tahiti United	Pīraʻe	French Polynesia	Stade Pater	15,000
Vanuatu United	Port Vila	Vanuatu	Port Vila Municipal Stadium	10,000

== Broadcasting ==
Region	Broadcaster	Language
Fiji	FBC	English
New Zealand	TVNZ+ (Note: Auckland FC and South Island United matches only.)	English
Papua New Guinea	NBC	English
Solomon Islands	TTV	English
Tahiti	TNTV (Note: Tahiti United matches only.)	French
Vanuatu	VBTC	French
Worldwide	FIFA+	English

== See also ==
- European Super League, a proposed tournament with a similar format for clubs in Europe
- African Football League, a former tournament with a similar format for clubs in Africa
- List of top-division football clubs in OFC countries
