= 2026 OFC Men's Champions League final =

Football match in Ba, Fiji

- Event: 2026 OFC Men's Champions League
Auckland City	Central Coast
(New Zealand)	(Solomon Islands)
2	0
- Date: 22 August 2026
- Venue: Govind Park, Ba
- Man of the Match: Mario Ilich (Auckland City)
- Referee: Veer Singh (Fiji)
- Attendance: 250

The 2026 OFC Men's Champions League final was the final match of the 2026 OFC Men's Champions League, the 25th edition of the Oceanian Club Championship, Oceania's premier club football tournament organized by the Oceania Football Confederation (OFC), and the 20th season under the current OFC Men's Champions League name.

The final was a single match between New Zealand's Auckland City and Solomon Islands's Central Coast. The match took place at the Govind Park in Ba on 22 August 2026.

Auckland City won the match 2-0 for a record-extending 14th title.

== Teams ==
In the following table, finals until 2006 were in the Oceania Club Championship era, since 2007 were in the OFC Champions League era.

Team	Previous finals appearances (bold indicates winners)
(New Zealand) Auckland City	13 (**2006**, **2009**, **2011**, **2012**, **2013**, **2014**, **2015**, **2016**, **2017**, **2022**, **2023**, **2024**, **2025**)
(Solomon Islands) Central Coast	–

== Venue ==
The Govind Park was the venue for the final. This was the second time that the stadium hosted an OFC Men's Champions League final.

== Road to the final ==
Note: In all results below, the score of the finalist is given first (H: home; A: away; N: neutral).

(New Zealand) Auckland City		Round	(Solomon Islands) Central Coast	
Opponent	Result	Group stage	Opponent	Result
(Solomon Islands) Central Coast	2–1	Matchday 1	(New Zealand) Auckland City	1–2
(New Caledonia) Tiga Sport	1–0	Matchday 2	(French Polynesia) Venus	3–0
(French Polynesia) Venus	4–3	Matchday 3	(New Caledonia) Tiga Sport	2–0
**Group A winners**: Pos / Team / Pld / Pts; **1** / (New Zealand) Auckland City / **3** / **9**; 2 / (Solomon Islands) Central Coast / 3 / **6**; 3 / (New Caledonia) Tiga Sport / 3 / **3**; 4 / (French Polynesia) Vénus / 3 / **0**; Source: OFC		Final standings	**Group A runners-up**: Pos / Team / Pld / Pts; 1 / (New Zealand) Auckland City / 3 / **9**; **2** / (Solomon Islands) Central Coast / **3** / **6**; 3 / (New Caledonia) Tiga Sport / 3 / **3**; 4 / (French Polynesia) Vénus / 3 / **0**; Source: OFC	
Opponent	Result	Knockout stage	Opponent	Result
(Fiji) Rewa	3–1	Semi-finals	(Vanuatu) Galaxy	3–2 (a.e.t.)

== Format ==
If the match is level at the end of 90 minutes of normal playing time, extra time will be played (two periods of 15 minutes each), where each team would be allowed to make a fourth substitution. If still tied after extra time, the match will be decided by a penalty shoot-out to determine the winners.

== Match ==
=== Details ===
22 August 2026
15:00 UTC+12

Auckland City (New Zealand)	2−0	(Solomon Islands) Central Coast
de Vries 69'; Ellis 81'	Report

Govind Park, Ba
Attendance: 250
Referee: Veer Singh (Fiji)

**Auckland City**	**Central Coast**

GK	24	(New Zealand) Matt Foord
DF	25	(New Zealand) Michael den Heijer
DF	4	(New Zealand) Christian Gray
DF	13	(New Zealand) Nathan Lobo		(substituted off) 74'
DF	5	(New Zealand) Nathan Rostron
MF	26	(New Zealand) Matthew Ellis	(yellow card) 51'	(substituted off) 85'
MF	8	(Spain) Gerard Garriga		(substituted off) 85'
MF	2	(New Zealand) Mario Ilich (c)
FW	11	(New Zealand) Ryan de Vries		(substituted off) 74'
FW	7	(Czech Republic) Michal Doudera		(substituted off) 87'
FW	20	(Czech Republic) Pavel Osmancik
Substitutes:
GK	1	(New Zealand) Cameron Brown
DF	23	(New Zealand) Alfie Rogers		(substituted on) 74'
MF	15	(New Zealand) Jeremy Foo
MF	10	(New Zealand) Dylan Manickum
MF	17	(New Zealand) Ryan Watson		(substituted on) 74'
FW	16	(New Zealand) Fergus Gillion		(substituted on) 87'
FW	27	(New Zealand) Thomas Golding		(substituted on) 85'
FW	21	(New Zealand) Bono Kacurov		(substituted on) 85'
Manager:
(Czech Republic) Rudolf Mozr

GK	23	(Solomon Islands) Erick Wanega
DF	14	(Solomon Islands) Junior David
DF	27	(Solomon Islands) Vincent Liuga
DF	3	(Solomon Islands) Prince Tahunipue	(red card) 83'
DF	5	(Solomon Islands) Javin Wae (c)
MF	13	(Solomon Islands) Hudson Oreinima
MF	30	(Solomon Islands) Marlon Tahioa	(substituted off) 78'
FW	6	(Solomon Islands) Hudyn Irodao
FW	7	(Solomon Islands) Raphael Lea'i
FW	10	(Solomon Islands) Bobby Leslie
FW	11	(Solomon Islands) Barrie Limoki	(yellow card) 62'	(substituted off) 78'
Substitutes:
GK	1	(Solomon Islands) Gideon Abidan
GK	25	(Solomon Islands) Raymond Wane
DF	8	(Solomon Islands) Paul Amasia
DF	2	(Solomon Islands) Fred Bala
MF	15	(Solomon Islands) Cyral Enotarau
MF	21	(Solomon Islands) Carlos Liomasia		(substituted on) 78'
FW	18	(Solomon Islands) Clifford Fafale
FW	9	(Solomon Islands) Junior Fordney		(substituted on) 78'
Manager:
(Solomon Islands) Jacob Moli

Man of the Match:
Mario Ilich (Auckland City)

Assistant referees:
Bertrand Brial (New Caledonia)
Malaetela Salanoa (Samoa)
Fourth official:
David Yareboinen (Papua New Guinea)
Fifth official:
Navneel Karan (Fiji)

**Match rules**

- 90 minutes.
- 30 minutes of extra time if scores level.
- Penalty shoot-out if scores still level.
- Maximum of three substitutions, with a fourth allowed in extra time.
