= 2026 in New Zealand association football =

Football in New Zealand
- Season: 2026

Men's football
- Northern League: Birkenhead United
- Central League: Napier City Rovers
- Southern League: Cashmere Technical
- Chatham Cup: Fencibles United

Women's football
- NRFL Women's Premiership: Auckland United
- Kate Sheppard Cup: Eastern Suburbs

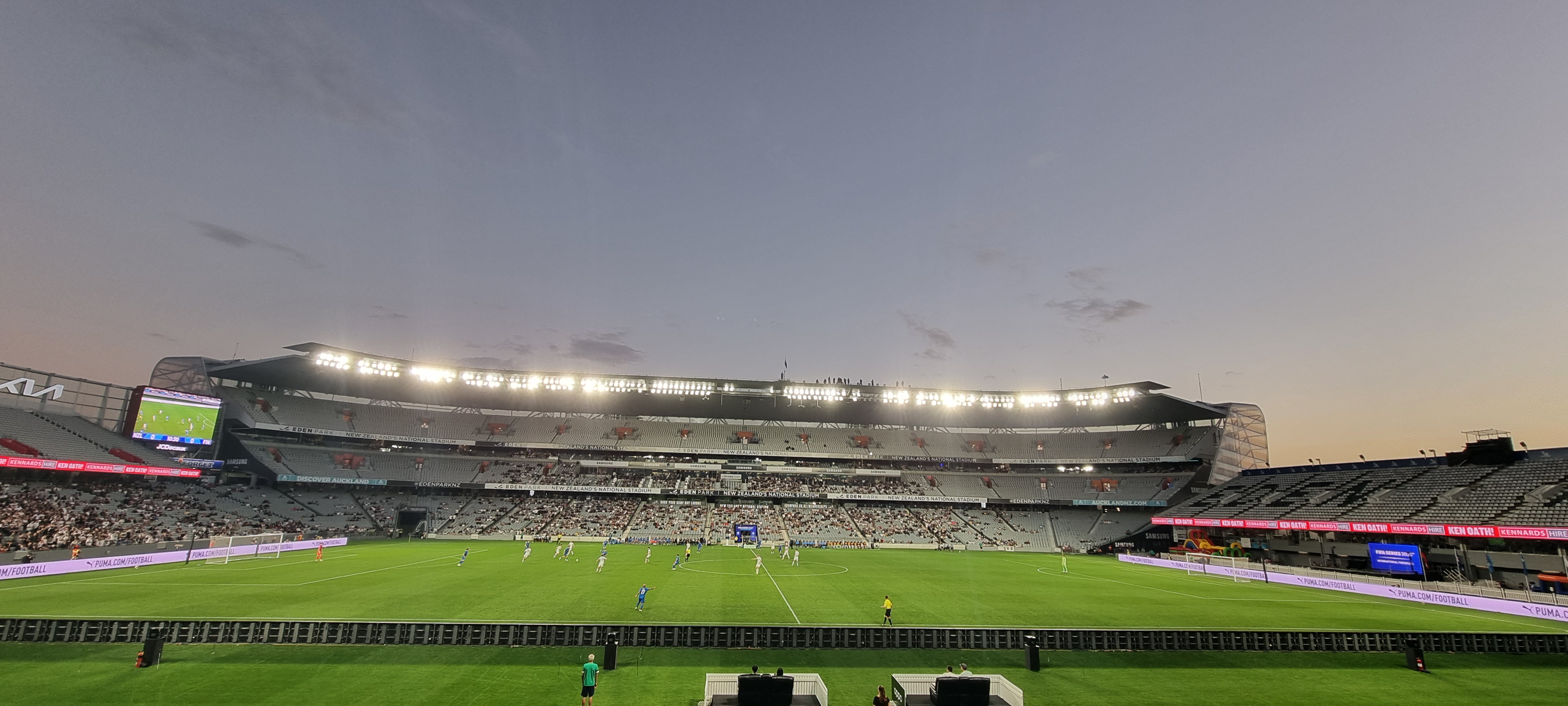
Match between the All Whites and Finland on 27 March 2026 at Eden Park, Auckland.

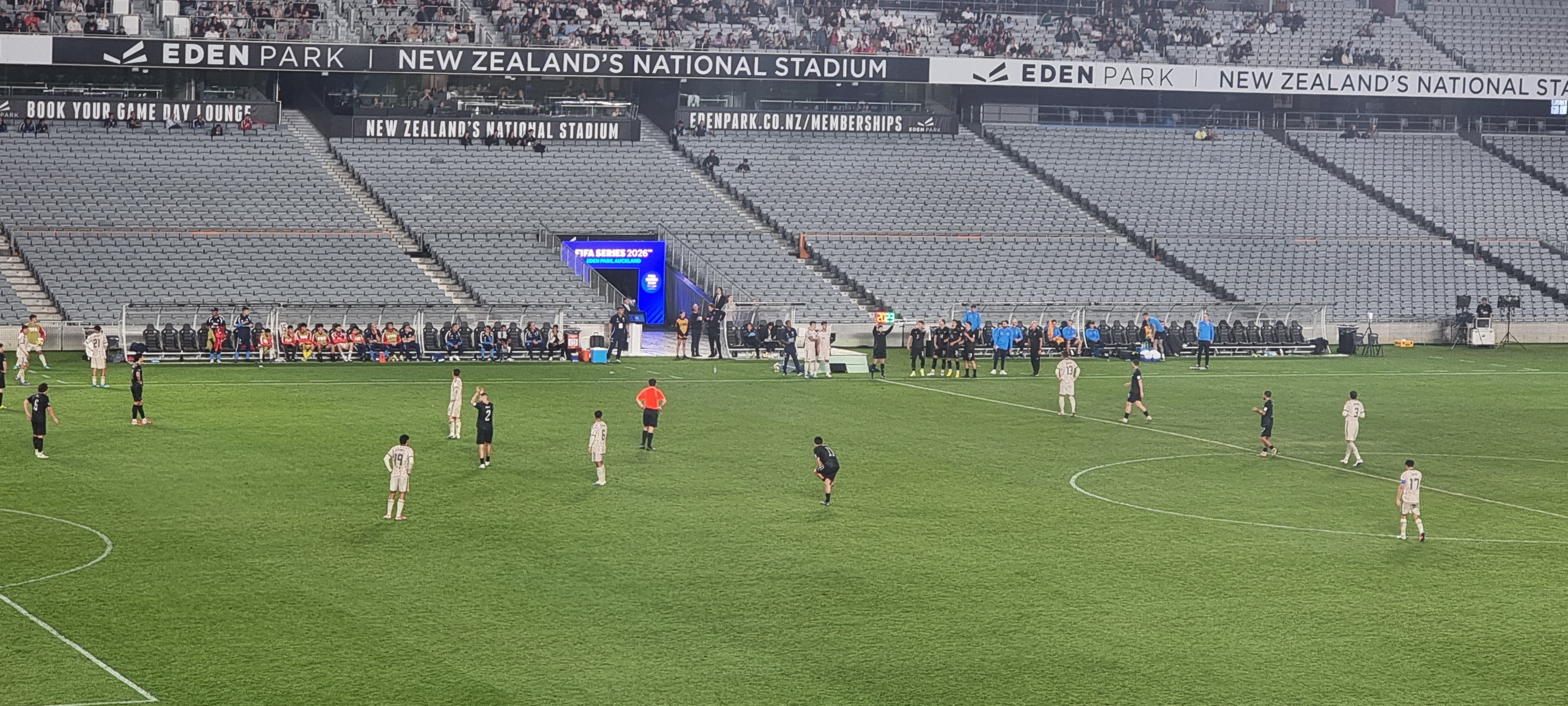
Match between the All Whites and Chile on 30 March 2026 at Eden Park, Auckland.

The 2026 season is the 136th competitive association football season in New Zealand.

== National teams ==
=== Men's senior ===
==== Friendlies ====
2 June Friendly	Haiti	4–0	New Zealand	Fort Lauderdale, United States
20:00 UTC−4 (Note: Kick-off was delayed until 20:36 due to lightning in the area before the match.)	Providence 12'; Joseph 51'; Pierrot 62'; Lacroix 87'	Report		Stadium: Inter Miami CF Stadium; Attendance: 16,000+ Referee: Rubiel Vazquez (United States)

7 June Friendly	England	1–0	New Zealand	Tampa, United States
16:00 UTC−4	Kane 45+2'	Report		Stadium: Raymond James Stadium; Attendance: 25,889; Referee: Natalie Simon (United States)

24 September Friendly	Palestine	2–2	New Zealand	Chongqing, China
17:30 UTC+8	Al Hamlawi 27'; Dabbagh 39'	Report	Waine 5'; Randall 35'	Stadium: Tongliang Long Stadium; Attendance: 0 (Played behind closed doors); Referee: Wang Di (China)

27 September Friendly	China	0–3	New Zealand	Chongqing, China
19:35 UTC+8		Report	Bindon 4'; Waine 29'; Parker-Price 82'	Stadium: Longxing Football Stadium; Attendance: 15,160; Referee: Hyun-Jae Choi (Korea Republic)

12 November Friendly	New Zealand	5–0	India	Auckland, New Zealand
19:00 UTC+13	Varghese 5' (o.g.); Randall 34', 43'; Wood 57'; Bayliss 75'	AIFF; NZF		Stadium: Go Media Stadium; Attendance: 10,379; Referee: Adam Kersey (Australia)

15 November Friendly	New Zealand	3–0	India	Christchurch, New Zealand
16:30 UTC+13	Surman 22'; McGarry 40'; Wood 44'	Report		Stadium: One New Zealand Stadium; Referee: Tim Danaskos (Australia)

==== 2026 Kirin Cup ====
1 October Kirin Cup Soccer	Panama	1–1 (3–5 p)	New Zealand	Yokohama, Japan
15:10 UTC+9	Herbert 45+1'	Report	Stamenić 13'	Stadium: Nissan Stadium; Attendance: 8,513; Referee: Rubiel Vazquez (United States)
	Penalties
	Murillo (penalty scored); Harvey (penalty scored); Jiménez (penalty missed); Griffith (penalty missed)		(penalty scored) Bindon; (penalty scored) Stamenić; (penalty scored) Dyer; (penalty scored) Bayliss; (penalty scored) Boxall

5 October Kirin Cup Soccer	Japan	2–1	New Zealand	Tokyo, Japan
19:30 UTC+9	Ueda 28'; Dōan 71'	Report	Old 32'	Stadium: Japan National Stadium; Attendance: 61,812; Referee: Nazmi Nasaruddin (Malaysia)

==== 2026 FIFA Series ====
Pos	Team	Pld	W	PW	PL	L	GF	GA	GD	Pts
1	Finland (C)	2	1	0	1	0	3	1	+2	4
2	New Zealand (H)	2	1	0	0	1	4	3	+1	3
3	Chile	2	1	0	0	1	5	6	−1	3
4	Cape Verde	2	0	1	0	1	3	5	−2	2

(C) Champion; (H) Host

27 March 2026	New Zealand	0–2	Finland	Auckland, New Zealand
19:00 UTC+13		Report	Pohjanpalo 25'; Oksanen 85'	Stadium: Eden Park; Attendance: 17,603; Referee: Casey Reibelt (Australia)

30 March 2026	New Zealand	4–1	Chile	Auckland, New Zealand
19:00 UTC+13	Barbarouses 31'; Just 40'; Randall 60'; Waine 71'	Report	Tapia 83'	Stadium: Eden Park; Attendance: 14,327; Referee: Jack Morgan (Australia)

==== 2026 FIFA World Cup ====
===== 2026 FIFA World Cup Group G =====
Pos	Team	Pld	W	D	L	GF	GA	GD	Pts	Qualification
1	Belgium	3	1	2	0	6	2	+4	5 (Note: Tied on head-to-head result (Belgium 1–1 Egypt). Overall goal difference was used as the tiebreaker.)	Advance to knockout stage
2	Egypt	3	1	2	0	5	3	+2	5	Advance to knockout stage
3	Iran	3	0	3	0	3	3	0	3	
4	New Zealand	3	0	1	2	4	10	−6	1	

Source: FIFA
Rules for classification: Group stage tiebreakers
Notes:

15 June 2026 FIFA World Cup Group G	Iran	2–2	New Zealand	Inglewood, United States
18:00 UTC−7	Rezaeian 32'; Mohebi 64'	Report	Just 7', 54'	Stadium: SoFi Stadium; Attendance: 70,108; Referee: César Arturo Ramos (Mexico)

21 June 2026 FIFA World Cup Group G	New Zealand	1–3	Egypt	Vancouver, Canada
18:00 UTC−7	Surman 15'	Report	Ziko 58'; Salah 67'; Trézéguet 82'	Stadium: BC Place; Attendance: 52,497; Referee: Omar Al Ali (United Arab Emirates)

26 June 2026 FIFA World Cup Group G	New Zealand	1–5	Belgium	Vancouver, Canada
20:00 UTC−7	Just 84'	Report	Trossard 28', 50'; De Bruyne 66'; Lukaku 86'; Saelemaekers 90+4'	Stadium: BC Place; Attendance: 52,497; Referee: Adham Makhadmeh (Jordan)

=== Women's senior ===
==== Friendlies ====
5 June Friendly	New Zealand	1–2	Haiti	Málaga, Spain
18:00 UTC+2	Bunge 41'	Report	Mondesir 45'; Etienne 47'	Stadium: Nuevo Estadio El Maulí

9 June Friendly	New Zealand	0–0	Morocco	Málaga, Spain
18:00 UTC+2		Report		Stadium: Nuevo Estadio El Maulí

10 October Friendly	Panama	Cancelled	New Zealand	Panama City, Panama
19:00 UTC−5		Report		Stadium: Estadio Rommel Fernández
Note: Two-match series between Panama cancelled due to the 2026 Panama earthquake.

13 October Friendly	Panama	Cancelled	New Zealand	Panama City, Panama
16:30 UTC−5		Report		Stadium: Estadio Rommel Fernández
Note: Two-match series between Panama cancelled due to the 2026 Panama earthquake.

29 November Friendly	New Zealand	v	Philippines	Porirua, New Zealand
		Report		Stadium: Porirua Park

4 December Friendly	New Zealand	v	Philippines	Porirua, New Zealand
		Report		Stadium: Porirua Park

==== 2027 FIFA Women's World Cup qualification ====
===== Second round =====
Pos	Team	Pld	W	D	L	GF	GA	GD	Pts	Qualification	(New Zealand)	(American Samoa)	(Samoa)	(Solomon Islands)
1	New Zealand	3	3	0	0	19	0	+19	9	Advance to the third round	—	—	8–0	8–0
2	American Samoa	3	2	0	1	2	3	−1	6	Advance to the third round	0–3	—	1–0	—
3	Samoa	3	1	0	2	2	10	−8	3		—	—	—	2–1
4	Solomon Islands (H)	3	0	0	3	1	11	−10	0		—	0–1	—	—

Source: OFC
(H) Hosts

27 February 2027 FIFA Women's World Cup qualification	New Zealand	8–0	Samoa	Honiara, Solomon Islands
13:00 UTC+11	Brown 1', 13', 39'; Kitching 65'; Aisei 82' (o.g.); Elliott 83', 89'; Jackson 90+7'	Report (FIFA)		Stadium: National Stadium; Attendance: 200; Referee: Mu Mingxin (China)

2 March 2027 FIFA Women's World Cup qualification	New Zealand	8–0	Solomon Islands	Honiara, Solomon Islands
17:00 UTC+11	Clegg 2', 81'; Riley 8'; Blake 16', 65', 73'; Jale 61'; Vlok 75'	Report (FIFA)		Stadium: National Stadium; Attendance: 400; Referee: Gulshoda Saitkulova (Uzbekistan)

5 March 2027 FIFA Women's World Cup qualification	American Samoa	0–3	New Zealand	Honiara, Solomon Islands
13:00 UTC+11		Report (FIFA)	Brown 41' (pen.); Bunge 51'; Riley 71'	Stadium: National Stadium; Attendance: 200; Referee: Mu Mingxin (China)

===== Third round =====
Following the Football Ferns' victories, they qualified for their sixth FIFA Women's World Cup campaign. The World Cup will take place in Brazil between June and July 2027.

11 April 2027 FIFA Women's World Cup qualification	New Zealand	5–0	Fiji	Hamilton, New Zealand
16:10 UTC+12	Brown 11'; Taylor 21'; Foster 27'; Kitching 38'; Blake 74'	Report (FIFA)		Stadium: FMG Stadium Waikato; Attendance: 3,267; Referee: Shama Maemae (Solomon Islands)

15 April 2027 FIFA Women's World Cup qualification	Papua New Guinea	0–1	New Zealand	Auckland, New Zealand
19:10 UTC+12		Report (FIFA); Report (OFC)	Kitching 55'	Stadium: North Harbour Stadium; Attendance: 3,984; Referee: Torika Delai (Fiji)

=== Men's under-20 ===
==== 2026 OFC U-19 Men's Championship ====
===== Group B =====
Pos	Team	Pld	W	D	L	GF	GA	GD	Pts	Qualification
1	New Zealand	3	3	0	0	16	0	+16	9	Knockout stage
2	Tahiti	3	1	1	1	3	10	−7	4	Knockout stage
3	Fiji	3	1	0	2	8	6	+2	3	5th place match
4	Vanuatu	3	0	1	2	3	14	−11	1	7th place match

Updated to match(es) played on 5 September 2026. Source: OFC

2 September 2026	New Zealand	8–0	Tahiti	FFS Football Stadium (Field 2), Apia, Samoa
15:00	Martin 8'; Cartwright 37'; Hill 40'; Smith 45+3'; Grosso 60'; Fitzharris 72', 86'; Henry 75'	Report		Attendance: 60; Referee: David Yareboinen (Papua New Guinea)

5 September 2026	New Zealand	2–0	Fiji	FFS Football Stadium (Field 2), Apia, Samoa
15:00	Ferguson 54'; Grosso 79'	Report		Attendance: 60; Referee: David Yareboinen (Papua New Guinea)

8 September 2026	Vanuatu	0–6	New Zealand	FFS Football Stadium (Field 2), Apia, Samoa
15:00		Report	Sloane-Rodrigues 35'; Grosso 45'; Ferguson 50', 56', 76'; Hill 71'	Attendance: 50; Referee: Peter Olomaga (Samoa)

===== Semifinal =====
11 September 2026	New Zealand	6–1	New Caledonia	FFS Football Stadium (Field 1), Apia, Samoa
15:00	Hill 23', 50'; Lienard 43'; Sloane-Rodrigues 53'; Martin 64'; Grosso 90+4'	Report	Katrawa 70' (pen.)	Referee: Ben Aukwai (Solomon Islands)

===== Final =====
14 September 2026	Tahiti	0–2	New Zealand	FFS Football Stadium (Field 1), Apia, Samoa
15:00		Report	Dieulangard 45' (o.g.); Hill 79'	Attendance: 60; Referee: Ben Aukwai (Solomon Islands)

=== Women's under-20 ===
==== Friendlies ====
20 May Friendly	Australia	1–1	New Zealand	Canberra, Australia
	Trimis	Report	Bangalan 85'	Stadium: Australian Institute of Sport; Attendance: 0 (behind closed doors)

23 May Friendly	Australia	0–0	New Zealand	Canberra, Australia
		Report		Stadium: Australian Institute of Sport

29 August Friendly	New Zealand	0–0 (5–4 p)	South Korea	Poznań, Poland
		Report

3 September Friendly	Lech Poznań UAM	0–0	New Zealand	Poznań, Poland
		Report

==== 2026 FIFA U-20 Women's World Cup ====
===== Group D =====
Pos	Team	Pld	W	D	L	GF	GA	GD	Pts	Qualification
1	Italy	3	2	1	0	6	2	+4	7	Knockout stage
2	Japan	3	1	2	0	5	4	+1	5	Knockout stage
3	United States	3	1	1	1	12	4	+8	4	Knockout stage
4	New Zealand	3	0	0	3	1	14	−13	0	

Source: FIFA
Rules for classification: Group stage tiebreakers

6 September 2026	Japan	2–1	New Zealand	Łódź, Poland
15:00 (CEST)	Matsunaga 49', 90+2' (pen.)	Report	L. Brazendale 59'	Stadium: Stadion Miejski ŁKS Łódź; Attendance: 385; Referee: Antsino Twanyanyukwa (Namibia)

9 September 2026	Italy	3–0	New Zealand	Stadion Miejski ŁKS Łódź, Łódź
15:00	Ventriglia 78', 83'; Appiah 89'	Report		Attendance: 287; Referee: Lizzet García (Mexico)

12 September 2026	New Zealand	0–9	United States	Arena Sosnowiec, Sosnowiec
15:00		Report	Buck 4', 58'; Fuller 6', 83', 90+2' (pen.); M. Johnson 38'; Ullmark 43'; Adames 60'; Strawn 87'	Attendance: 375; Referee: Anahí Fernández (Uruguay)

=== Men's under-17 ===
==== 28th International Youth Soccer in Niigata ====
Pos	Team	Pld	W	PW	PL	L	GF	GA	GD	Pts
1	Japan	3	3	0	0	0	10	2	+8	9
2	(Niigata Prefecture) Niigata Regional Team (H)	3	2	0	0	1	5	4	+1	6
3	Myanmar	3	1	0	0	2	4	6	−2	3
4	New Zealand	3	0	0	0	3	2	9	−7	0

Source: Instagram
(H) Host

17 September 2026	New Zealand	2–3	(Niigata Prefecture) Niigata Regional Team	Niigata
12:00 JST	Nunez 5'; Hamilton 85'	Report		Stadium: Niigata City Athletic Stadium

19 September 2026	Myanmar	2–0	New Zealand	Niigata
15:00 JST		Report		Stadium: Niigata City Athletic Stadium

21 September 2026	Japan	4–0	New Zealand	Niigata
15:00 JST		Report		Stadium: Denka Big Swan Stadium

==== 2026 OFC U-16 Men's Championship ====
===== Group B =====
Pos	Team	Pld	W	D	L	GF	GA	GD	Pts	Qualification
1	New Zealand	3	3	0	0	18	2	+16	9	Knockout stage
2	Solomon Islands	3	2	0	1	6	7	−1	6	Knockout stage
3	Tahiti	3	1	0	2	6	11	−5	3	5th place match
4	Vanuatu	3	0	0	3	3	13	−10	0	7th place match

First match(es) will be played: 2 September 2026. Source: OFC

13 July 2026	New Zealand	5–1	Solomon Islands	Sir Hubert Murray Stadium, Port Moresby, Papua New Guinea
16:00	Lulu 38' (o.g.); Clegg 48', 77'; Trenberth 69'; Lee Sang 79'		Hoova 59'	Attendance: 70

16 July 2026	New Zealand	6–1	Tahiti	Sir Hubert Murray Stadium, Port Moresby, Papua New Guinea
16:00	Clegg 10'; Skinner 13'; Trenberth 50'; Cashmore 65', 88'; Bancroft 84'		Jamet 80'

19 July 2026	Vanuatu	0–7	New Zealand	Sir Hubert Murray Stadium, Port Moresby, Papua New Guinea
16:00			Cashmore 5', 10', 15', 31'; Amyes 39'; Trenberth 70'; Santos 72'

===== Knockout stages =====
Semifinal

22 July 2026	New Zealand	3–0	Papua New Guinea	PNG Football Stadium, Port Moresby, Papua New Guinea
19:30	Basananuc 50' (o.g.); Pietersen 60', 90'	Report		Referee: Neeshil Varman (Fiji)

Final

25 July 2026	Fiji	0–5	New Zealand	PNG Football Stadium, Port Moresby, Papua New Guinea
19:30		Report	Cashmore 2'; Valle dos Santos 36', 81'; Maharaj 45' (o.g.); Clegg 76'	Attendance: 300; Referee: Peter Olomaga (Samoa)

==== 2026 FIFA U-17 World Cup ====
===== Group G =====
Pos	Team	Pld	W	D	L	GF	GA	GD	Pts	Qualification
1	Mali	0	0	0	0	0	0	0	0	Knockout stage
2	New Zealand	0	0	0	0	0	0	0	0	Knockout stage
3	Belgium	0	0	0	0	0	0	0	0	Possible knockout stage
4	Vietnam	0	0	0	0	0	0	0	0	

First match(es) will be played: 20 November 2026. Source: FIFA
Rules for classification: Group stage tiebreakers

20 November 2026	Mali	v	New Zealand	Aspire Zone, Al Rayyan, Qatar
		Report

23 November 2026	Vietnam	v	New Zealand	Aspire Zone, Al Rayyan, Qatar
		Report

26 November 2026	New Zealand	v	Belgium	Aspire Zone, Al Rayyan, Qatar
		Report

=== Women's under-17 ===
==== 2026 OFC U-16 Women's Championship ====
===== Group A =====
Pos	Team	Pld	W	D	L	GF	GA	GD	Pts	Qualification
1	New Zealand	3	3	0	0	14	0	+14	9	Knockout stage
2	Fiji	3	2	0	1	15	4	+11	6	Knockout stage
3	Solomon Islands (H)	3	0	1	2	3	9	−6	1	
4	Cook Islands	3	0	1	2	0	19	−19	1	

Source: OFC
(H) Hosts

6 September 2026	New Zealand	5–0	Solomon Islands	Honiara, Solomon Islands
19:00	Ellis 5'; Saunders 7', 45+3', 90+3'; Dwyer 18'	Report		Stadium: National Stadium; Attendance: 400; Referee: Jarethy George (Vanuatu)

9 September 2026	New Zealand	1–0	Fiji	Honiara, Solomon Islands
	Rice 90+5'	Report		Stadium: National Stadium; Attendance: 296; Referee: Rayan Herry (France)

12 September 2026	Cook Islands	0–8	New Zealand	Honiara, Solomon Islands
		Report	Toatelegese 2'; Wilkinson 14'; Saunders 34', 88'; Barber 45'; Casson 71', 83'; Rennell 90+4'	Stadium: National Stadium; Attendance: 200; Referee: Yantama Atoa (Tonga)

===== Semifinal =====
16 September 2026	New Zealand	3–0	Papua New Guinea	Honiara, Solomon Islands
16:00	Clark 27'; Dwyer 62'; Barber 77'	Report		Stadium: National Stadium; Attendance: 200; Referee: Torika Delai (Fiji)

===== Final =====
19 September 2026	New Zealand	4–0	New Caledonia	Honiara, Solomon Islands
19:00	Rice 48', 66'; Wilson 87'; Hace 90+5' (o.g.)	Report		Stadium: National Stadium; Attendance: 400; Referee: Shama Maemae (Solomon Islands)

==== 2026 FIFA U-17 Women's World Cup ====
===== Group A =====
Pos	Team	Pld	W	D	L	GF	GA	GD	Pts	Qualification
1	Germany	3	3	0	0	8	3	+5	9	Knockout stage
2	Argentina	3	2	0	1	8	3	+5	6	Knockout stage
3	Morocco	3	1	0	2	7	9	−2	3	Knockout stage
4	New Zealand	3	0	0	3	0	8	−8	0	

Source: FIFA
Rules for classification: Group stage tiebreakers

17 October 2026	Morocco	4–0	New Zealand	Mohammed VI Football Academy (Pitch 3), Salé
18:00	Abajiou 57'; Chaytor 70' (o.g.); Dhissi 76'; Youssoufi 82' (pen.)	Report		Attendance: 259; Referee: Carly Shaw-MacLaren (Canada)

20 October 2026	Argentina	2–0	New Zealand	Mohammed VI Football Academy (Pitch 1), Salé
15:00	Diz 42', 69'	Report		Attendance: 231; Referee: Natalie Simon (United States)

23 October 2026	New Zealand	0–2	Germany	Mohammed VI Football Academy (Pitch 3), Salé
18:00		Report	Ernst 45+2'; Choisy 56'	Attendance: 461; Referee: Josephine Wanjiru (Kenya)

=== Men's under-15 ===
==== FIFA U-15 World Cup & Festival ====
===== Group T =====
Pos	Team	Pld	W	D	L	GF	GA	GD	Pts	Qualification
1	Venezuela	5	4	1	0	16	2	+14	13	Advance to Tier A
2	Madagascar	5	4	0	1	12	8	+4	12	Advance to Tier B
3	Mozambique	5	3	1	1	10	9	+1	10	Advance to Tier C
4	Somalia	5	1	0	4	8	13	−5	3 (Note: Tied on head-to-head points. Head-to-head goal difference was used as the tiebreaker (Somalia +1, Puerto Rico 0, New Zealand −1).)	Advance to Tier D
5	Puerto Rico	5	1	0	4	13	19	−6	3	Advance to Tier E
6	New Zealand	5	1	0	4	8	16	−8	3	Advance to Tier F

Source: FIFA
Rules for classification: Qualification stage tiebreakers
Notes:

Final (161st-place match)

30 October 2026	New Zealand	2–1	Ethiopia	Baku Crystal Hall, Baku
09:00		Report

== FIFA competitions ==
=== FIFA Intercontinental Cup ===
26 August 2026 First round	Al-Ahli (Saudi Arabia)	1–0	(New Zealand) Auckland FC	Jeddah, Saudi Arabia
21:00 AST	Abu Al-Shamat 63'	Report		Stadium: King Abdullah Sports City; Attendance: 46,628; Referee: Amin Omar (Egypt)

=== 2027 FIFA Women's Champions Cup ===
25 October 2026 Round 1	Naegohyang (North Korea)	2–0	(New Zealand) Auckland United	Hangzhou, China
15:00 UTC+8	Kim Kyong-yong 17', 88'	Report		Stadium: Shangcheng Sports Centre Stadium; Attendance: 3,987; Referee: Silvia Gasperotti (Italy)

== OFC competitions ==
=== OFC Professional League ===
==== Circuit series ====
===== Auckland FC =====
Pos	Team	Pld	W	D	L	GF	GA	GD	Pts	Qualification
1	(New Zealand) Auckland FC	14	10	2	2	26	10	+16	32	Qualification for Leaders play-off group
2	(Australia) South Melbourne	14	7	4	3	40	18	+22	25	Qualification for Leaders play-off group
3	(Fiji) Bula FC	14	6	3	5	14	15	−1	21	Qualification for Leaders play-off group
4	(New Zealand) South Island United	14	5	5	4	24	26	−2	20	Qualification for Leaders play-off group
5	(Solomon Islands) Solomon Kings	14	5	3	6	14	21	−7	18	Qualification for Challengers play-off group

Source: OFC Pro League
Rules for classification: 1) Points; 2) Goal difference; 3) Goals scored; 4) Head to head; 5) Head to head goal difference; 6) Head to head goals scored; 7) Disciplinary record; 8) Coin toss

Home team	Score	Away team
Auckland FC (New Zealand)	3–0	(New Zealand) South Island United
Auckland FC (New Zealand)	3–1	Vanuatu United
Auckland FC (New Zealand)	1–0	(Fiji) Bula FC
PNG Hekari (Papua New Guinea)	0–2	(New Zealand) Auckland FC
Tahiti United (French Polynesia)	0–4	(New Zealand) Auckland FC
Auckland FC (New Zealand)	1–3	(Solomon Islands) Solomon Kings
South Melbourne (Australia)	1–1	(New Zealand) Auckland FC
Auckland FC (New Zealand)	1–0	(French Polynesia) Tahiti United
Solomon Kings (Solomon Islands)	0–1	(New Zealand) Auckland FC
Vanuatu United	0–0	(New Zealand) Auckland FC
Auckland FC (New Zealand)	3–2	(Australia) South Melbourne
Auckland FC (New Zealand)	2–0	(Papua New Guinea) PNG Hekari
Bula FC (Fiji)	2–1	(New Zealand) Auckland FC
South Island United (New Zealand)	1–3	(New Zealand) Auckland FC

===== South Island United =====
Pos	Team	Pld	W	D	L	GF	GA	GD	Pts	Qualification
2	(Australia) South Melbourne	14	7	4	3	40	18	+22	25	Qualification for Leaders play-off group
3	(Fiji) Bula FC	14	6	3	5	14	15	−1	21	Qualification for Leaders play-off group
4	(New Zealand) South Island United	14	5	5	4	24	26	−2	20	Qualification for Leaders play-off group
5	(Solomon Islands) Solomon Kings	14	5	3	6	14	21	−7	18	Qualification for Challengers play-off group
6	(French Polynesia) Tahiti United	14	4	5	5	20	28	−8	17	Qualification for Challengers play-off group

Source: OFC Pro League
Rules for classification: 1) Points; 2) Goal difference; 3) Goals scored; 4) Head to head; 5) Head to head goal difference; 6) Head to head goals scored; 7) Disciplinary record; 8) Coin toss

Home team	Score	Away team
Auckland FC (New Zealand)	3–0	(New Zealand) South Island United
South Island United (New Zealand)	2–1	Vanuatu United
South Island United (New Zealand)	3–3	(Australia) South Melbourne
Solomon Kings (Solomon Islands)	0–0	(New Zealand) South Island United
PNG Hekari (Papua New Guinea)	1–2	(New Zealand) South Island United
Tahiti United (French Polynesia)	2–2	(New Zealand) South Island United
South Melbourne (Australia)	4–1	(New Zealand) South Island United
Bula FC (Fiji)	0–0	(New Zealand) South Island United
South Island United (New Zealand)	4–1	(Papua New Guinea) PNG Hekari
South Island United (New Zealand)	2–3	(Fiji) Bula FC
Vanuatu United	1–2	(New Zealand) South Island United
South Island United (New Zealand)	3–3	(French Polynesia) Tahiti United
South Island United (New Zealand)	2–1	(Solomon Islands) Solomon Kings
South Island United (New Zealand)	1–3	(New Zealand) Auckland FC

==== Leaders play-off group ====
===== Auckland FC =====
Pos	Team	Pld	W	D	L	GF	GA	GD	Pts	Qualification
1	(Australia) South Melbourne	3	3	0	0	10	5	+5	9	Qualification for semi-finals
2	(New Zealand) Auckland FC	3	2	0	1	8	4	+4	6	Qualification for semi-finals
3	(New Zealand) South Island United	3	1	0	2	5	9	−4	3	Qualification for semi-finals
4	(Fiji) Bula FC	3	0	0	3	2	7	−5	0	Qualification for qualification play-off

Source: OFC Pro League
Rules for classification: 1) Points; 2) Goal difference; 3) Goals scored; 4) Head to head; 5) Head to head goal difference; 6) Head to head goals scored; 7) Disciplinary record; 8) Coin toss

Home team	Score	Away team
Auckland FC (New Zealand)	1–2	(Australia) South Melbourne
Auckland FC (New Zealand)	2–0	(Fiji) Bula FC
Auckland FC (New Zealand)	5–2	(New Zealand) South Island United

===== South Island United =====
Pos	Team	Pld	W	D	L	GF	GA	GD	Pts	Qualification
1	(Australia) South Melbourne	3	3	0	0	10	5	+5	9	Qualification for semi-finals
2	(New Zealand) Auckland FC	3	2	0	1	8	4	+4	6	Qualification for semi-finals
3	(New Zealand) South Island United	3	1	0	2	5	9	−4	3	Qualification for semi-finals
4	(Fiji) Bula FC	3	0	0	3	2	7	−5	0	Qualification for qualification play-off

Source: OFC Pro League
Rules for classification: 1) Points; 2) Goal difference; 3) Goals scored; 4) Head to head; 5) Head to head goal difference; 6) Head to head goals scored; 7) Disciplinary record; 8) Coin toss

Home team	Score	Away team
Bula FC (Fiji)	0–1	(New Zealand) South Island United
South Melbourne (Australia)	4–2	(New Zealand) South Island United
Auckland FC (New Zealand)	5–2	(New Zealand) South Island United

==== Knockout stage ====
===== Semi-finals =====
Team 1	Score	Team 2
Auckland FC (New Zealand)	1–0	(New Zealand) South Island United

===== Final =====
Team 1	Score	Team 2
South Melbourne (Australia)	1–2	(New Zealand) Auckland FC

=== OFC Champions League ===
==== Group stage ====
===== Auckland City =====
Pos	Team	Pld	W	D	L	GF	GA	GD	Pts	Qualification	AUC	CEN	TIG	VEN
1	(New Zealand) Auckland City	3	3	0	0	7	4	+3	9	Advance to knockout stage	—	—	—	4–3
2	(Solomon Islands) Central Coast	3	2	0	1	6	2	+4	6	Advance to knockout stage	1–2	—	—	3–0
3	(New Caledonia) Tiga Sport	3	1	0	2	1	3	−2	3		0–1	0–2	—	—
4	(French Polynesia) Vénus	3	0	0	3	3	8	−5	0		—	—	0–1	—

Source: OFC

Home team	Score	Away team
Central Coast (Solomon Islands)	1–2	(New Zealand) Auckland City
Tiga Sport (New Caledonia)	0–1	(New Zealand) Auckland City
Auckland City (New Zealand)	4–3	(French Polynesia) Venus

Semifinal

Home team	Score	Away team
Auckland City (New Zealand)	3–1	(Fiji) Rewa

Final

22 August 2026
15:00

Auckland City (New Zealand)	2–0	(Solomon Islands) Central Coast
De Vries 69'; Ellis 81'	Report

Govind Park, Ba
Attendance: 250
Referee: Veer Singh (Fiji)

=== OFC Women's Champions League ===
Auckland United

==== Group stage ====
Pos	Team	Pld	W	D	L	GF	GA	GD	Pts	Qualification
1	(New Zealand) Auckland United	2	2	0	0	18	1	+17	6	Advance to knockout stage
2	(Cook Islands) Puaikura	2	0	1	1	2	9	−7	1	Advance to knockout stage
3	(New Caledonia) Drehu Athletico Club	2	0	1	1	3	13	−10	1	

First match(es) will be played: unknown. Source:

Home team	Score	Away team
Auckland United (New Zealand)	11–1	(New Caledonia) Drehu AC
Auckland United (New Zealand)	7–0	(Cook Islands) Puaikura

==== Knockout stage ====
Semifinal

Home team	Score	Away team
Auckland United (New Zealand)	2–1	(Vanuatu) Tafea

Final

10 July 2026
18:00

Hekari Women's (Papua New Guinea)	1−3	(New Zealand) Auckland United
Elipas 18'	(OFC) (Report)	Granger 4'; Adamson 45+3'; Jensen 87'

National Stadium, Honiara, Solomon Islands
Attendance: 717
Referee: Torika Delai (Fiji)

== Men's football ==
League	Promoted to league	Relegated from league	Removed
Northern League	Manukau United; Melville United	Manurewa; West Coast Rangers	None
Central League	FC Western	North Wellington	None
Southern League	Northern	None	University of Canterbury

=== National League ===
Pos	Team	Pld	W	D	L	GF	GA	GD	Pts	Qualification
1	Cashmere Technical	7	4	1	2	21	5	+16	13	Qualification to Grand Final
2	Wellington Olympic	6	4	1	1	16	8	+8	13	Qualification to Grand Final
3	Auckland City	7	3	4	0	15	8	+7	13	
4	Birkenhead United	6	4	1	1	13	7	+6	13	
5	Miramar Rangers	6	3	1	2	11	8	+3	10	
6	Napier City Rovers	6	3	1	2	13	13	0	10	
7	Auckland United	7	2	2	3	15	13	+2	8	
8	Eastern Suburbs	6	2	1	3	7	13	−6	7	
9	Ferrymead Bays	7	2	1	4	4	11	−7	7	
10	Wellington Phoenix Reserves (Note: Auckland FC Reserves and Wellington Phoenix Reserves can not qualify for the Grand Final.)	7	1	2	4	6	19	−13	5	
11	Auckland FC Reserves	7	0	1	6	9	25	−16	1	

Updated to match(es) played on 14 November 2026. Source: New Zealand Football
Rules for classification: 1) Points; 2) Goal difference; 3) Goals for; 4) Goals against; 5) Head to head; 6) Disciplinary record

=== Northern League ===
Pos	Team	Pld	Pts
1	Birkenhead United (C, P)	22	58
2	Eastern Suburbs (P)	22	47
3	Auckland City (P)	22	45
4	Auckland United (P)	22	41
5	Fencibles United	22	41
6	East Coast Bays	22	35
7	Auckland FC Reserves (P)	22	27
8	Western Springs (O, P)	22	24
9	Melville United	22	20
10	Bay Olympic	22	16
11	Tauranga City	22	15
12	Manukau United	22	7

Source: NRF
(C) Champions;
(O) Play-off winners;
(P) Promoted

=== Central League ===
Pos	Team	Pld	Pts
1	Napier City Rovers (C, P)	18	44
2	Wellington Olympic (P)	18	42
3	Miramar Rangers (P)	18	41
4	Western Suburbs	18	36
5	Upper Hutt City	18	24
6	Island Bay United	18	22
7	Waterside Karori	18	15
8	Petone	18	13
9	Wellington Phoenix Reserves (P)	18	11
10	FC Western	18	6

Source: Capital Football
(C) Champions;
(P) Promoted

=== Southern League ===
Pos	Team	Pld	Pts
1	Cashmere Technical (C, P)	18	52
2	Ferrymead Bays	18	38
3	Nomads United	18	36
4	Coastal Spirit (P)	18	34
5	Nelson Suburbs	18	25
6	Northern	18	23
7	Christchurch United	18	20
8	Dunedin City Royals	18	16
9	Wānaka	18	10
10	Selwyn United	18	7

Source: Mainland Football
(C) Champions;
(P) Promoted

=== Cup Competitions ===
==== Chatham Cup ====
The following matches are from the quarterfinals onwards. Further matches can be seen on the 2026 Chatham Cup article.

Quarterfinals

Home team	Score	Away team
Fencibles United	3–2	Auckland City
Cashmere Technical	2–1	Miramar Rangers
Hibiscus Coast	2–5	Napier City Rovers
Nelson Suburbs	2–1	Auckland United

Semifinals

Home team	Score	Away team
Fencibles United	3–0	Nelson Suburbs
Cashmere Technical	2–1	Napier City Rovers

===== Final =====
Auckland-based club Fencibles United and Christchurch-based club Cashmere Technical qualified for the final. On 17 August, New Zealand Football confirmed the venue for the 2026 Chatham Cup final as being at One New Zealand Stadium, Christchurch. The 2026 Kate Sheppard Cup final was also be held on the same date at this venue.

5 September 2026
16:00

Cashmere Technical	1–2	Fencibles United
Murphy 62'	Report	Muñoz 33'; Nicol 80'

One New Zealand Stadium, Christchurch
Attendance: 11,267
Referee: Anna-Marie Keighley

== Women's football ==
=== National Women's League ===
2026 New Zealand Women's National League

=== Cup Competitions ===
==== Kate Sheppard Cup ====
The following matches are from the quarterfinals onwards only.

Quarterfinals

Home team	Score	Away team
Dunedin City Royals	1–2	Cashmere Technical
Ellerslie	2–1	Western Springs
Wellington Phoenix Reserves	4–0	Waterside Karori
Eastern Suburbs	1–0	Auckland United

Semifinals

Home team	Score	Away team
Cashmere Technical	2–1	Wellington Phoenix Reserves
Eastern Suburbs	6–0	Ellerslie

===== Final =====
On 17 August, New Zealand Football confirmed the venue for the 2026 Kate Sheppard Cup final as being at One New Zealand Stadium, Christchurch. The 2026 Chatham Cup final was also held on the same date at this venue.

5 September 2026
13:00 (NZST)

Cashmere Technical	1–3	Eastern Suburbs
Stephan 36'	Report	Anderson 19'; McPhie 48'; Skindlov 51'

One New Zealand Stadium, Christchurch
Attendance: 5,802
Referee: Sarah Jones

== Deaths ==
- 12 October 2026: Peter Whiting, 87, New Zealand and Miramar Rangers goalkeeper.

== New clubs ==
- Remutaka

== Clubs removed ==
- Franklin United

== Retirements ==
- 3 June 2026: Emiliano Tade, 38, former Wellington United, Team Wellington, Auckland City, Central United, Western Springs, Auckland United and Auckland FC (OFC) forward.
- 29 August 2026: Allan Pearce, 43, former New Zealand, Waitakere United and West Coast Rangers forward.
