= OFC Club Championship and OFC Champions League records and statistics =

This page details statistics of the Oceania Club Championship and OFC Champions League.

== Performances ==
=== Performance by club ===
Performance in the OFC Club Championship and OFC Champions League by club
Club	Titles	Runners-up	Years won	Years runner-up
(New Zealand) Auckland City	14	—	2006, 2009, 2011, 2012, 2013, 2014, 2015, 2016, 2017, 2022, 2023, 2024, 2025, 2026	—
(New Zealand) Waitakere United	2	2	2007, 2008	2010, 2013
(New Zealand) Team Wellington	1	3	2018	2015, 2016, 2017
(Papua New Guinea) Hekari United	1	1	2010	2025
(Australia) Adelaide City	1	—	1987	—
(Australia) South Melbourne	1	—	1999	—
(Australia) Wollongong Wolves	1	—	2001	—
(Australia) Sydney FC	1	—	2005	—
(New Caledonia) Hienghène Sport	1	—	2019	—
(French Polynesia) Pirae	—	2	—	2006, 2024
(New Caledonia) Magenta	—	2	—	2005, 2019
(Vanuatu) Amicale	—	2	—	2011, 2014
(New Zealand) Uni-Mount Bohemian	—	1	—	1987
(Fiji) Nadi	—	1	—	1999
(Vanuatu) Tafea	—	1	—	2001
(Fiji) Ba	—	1	—	2007
(Solomon Islands) Kossa	—	1	—	2008
(Solomon Islands) Koloale	—	1	—	2009
(French Polynesia) Tefana	—	1	—	2012
(Fiji) Lautoka	—	1	—	2018
(French Polynesia) Vénus	—	1	—	2022
(Fiji) Suva	—	1	—	2023
(Solomon Islands) Central Coast	—	1	—	2026

=== Performance by nation ===
Nation	Winners	Runners-up	Winning clubs	Runner-up clubs
New Zealand	17	6	Auckland City (14); Waitakere United (2); Team Wellington (1)	Waitakere United (2); Team Wellington (3); Uni-Mount Bohemian (1)
Australia (Note: Football Federation Australia were founder members of the Oceania Football Confederation (OFC) before joining the Asian Football Confederation in 2006.)	4	0	Adelaide City (1); South Melbourne (1); Wollongong Wolves (1); Sydney FC (1)	—N/a
New Caledonia	1	2	Hienghène Sport (1)	AS Magenta (2)
Papua New Guinea	1	1	Hekari United (1)	Hekari United (1)
Fiji	0	4	—N/a	Nadi (1); Ba (1); Lautoka (1); Suva (1)
Tahiti	0	4	—N/a	AS Pirae (2); AS Tefana (1); AS Vénus (1)
Solomon Islands	0	3	—N/a	Kossa (1); Koloale (1); Central Coast (1)
Vanuatu	0	3	—N/a	Amicale (2); Tafea (1)

Performances in finals by nation
Nation	Titles	Runners-up	Total
New Zealand	17	6	23
Australia	4	0	4
New Caledonia	1	2	3
Papua New Guinea	1	1	2
Fiji	0	4	4
Tahiti	0	4	4
Solomon Islands	0	3	3
Vanuatu	0	3	3

== Participating clubs ==
Winning seasons are highlighted in bold. Defunct clubs are highlighted in italics.

Nation	Club	Apps.	Seasons
Solomon Islands (11)	Solomon Warriors	9	2012–13, 2013–14, 2016, 2018, 2019, 2020, 2022, 2023, 2024
Solomon Islands (11)	Marist	5	2006, 2007, 2009–10, 2017, 2018
Solomon Islands (11)	Central Coast	4	2022, 2024, 2025, 2026
Solomon Islands (11)	Koloale	3	2008–09, 2010–11, 2011–12
Solomon Islands (11)	Kossa	2	2007–08, 2023
Solomon Islands (11)	Henderson Eels	2	2019, 2020
Solomon Islands (11)	Western United	2	2014–15, 2017
Solomon Islands (11)	Makuru	1	2005
Solomon Islands (11)	Laugu United	1	2001
Solomon Islands (11)	Malaita Eagles	1	1999
Solomon Islands (11)	Honiara Rangers	1	1987
Vanuatu (11)	Tafea	9	1987, 1999, 2001, 2005, 2006, 2007–08, 2009–10, 2013–14, 2014–15
Vanuatu (11)	Amicale	6	2010–11, 2011–12, 2012–13, 2013–14, 2014–15, 2016
Vanuatu (11)	Ifira Black Bird	3	2023, 2024, 2025
Vanuatu (11)	Malampa Revivors	3	2017, 2019, 2020
Vanuatu (11)	Erakor Golden Star	3	2017, 2018, 2019
Vanuatu (11)	Galaxy	3	2020, 2022, 2026
Vanuatu (11)	Classic FC	1	2024
Vanuatu (11)	Sia-Raga	1	2023
Vanuatu (11)	RueRue	1	2022
Vanuatu (11)	Nalkutan	1	2018
Vanuatu (11)	Port Vila Sharks	1	2008–09
New Zealand (9)	Auckland City	21	2005, **2006**, 2007, 2007–08, **2008–09**, 2009–10, **2010–11**, **2011–12**, **2012–13**, **2013–14**, **2014–15**, **2016**, **2017**, 2018, 2019, 2020, **2022**, **2023**, **2024**, **2025**, **2026**
New Zealand (9)	Waitakere United	8	**2007**, **2007–08**, 2008–09, 2009–10, 2010–11, 2011–12, 2012–13, 2013–14
New Zealand (9)	Team Wellington	5	2014–15, 2016, 2017, **2018**, 2019
New Zealand (9)	Wellington Olympic	2	2023, 2024
New Zealand (9)	Eastern Suburbs	1	2020
New Zealand (9)	YoungHeart Manawatu	1	2006
New Zealand (9)	Napier City Rovers	1	2001
New Zealand (9)	Central United	1	1999
New Zealand (9)	Uni-Mount Bohemian	1	1987
(French Polynesia) Tahiti (9)	Pirae	8	2005, 2006, 2013–14, 2014–15, 2022, 2023, 2024, 2025
(French Polynesia) Tahiti (9)	Tefana	7	2010–11, 2011–12, 2014–15, 2016, 2017, 2019, 2024
(French Polynesia) Tahiti (9)	Vénus	6	1999, 2001, 2018, 2020, 2022, 2026
(French Polynesia) Tahiti (9)	Dragon	4	2012–13, 2013–14, 2018, 2023
(French Polynesia) Tahiti (9)	Manu Ura	3	2005, 2007–08, 2009–10
(French Polynesia) Tahiti (9)	Central Sport	2	2017, 2019
(French Polynesia) Tahiti (9)	Tiare Tahiti	1	2020
(French Polynesia) Tahiti (9)	Temanava	1	2007
(French Polynesia) Tahiti (9)	Jeunes Tahitiens	1	1987
Papua New Guinea (9)	Hekari United	13	2008–09, **2009–10**, 2010–11, 2011–12, 2012–13, 2013–14, 2014–15, 2016, 2020, 2022, 2023, 2024, 2025
Papua New Guinea (9)	Lae City	8	2016, 2017, 2018, 2019, 2020, 2022, 2023, 2026
Papua New Guinea (9)	Madang	2	2017, 2018
Papua New Guinea (9)	Sobou	2	2005, 2006
Papua New Guinea (9)	Southern Strikers	1	2024
Papua New Guinea (9)	Morobe Wawens	1	2019
Papua New Guinea (9)	University Inter	1	2007–08
Papua New Guinea (9)	Unitech FC	1	2001
Papua New Guinea (9)	Guria	1	1987
New Caledonia (9)	Magenta	11	2005, 2006, 2009–10, 2010–11, 2013–14, 2016, 2017, 2018, 2019, 2020, 2024
New Caledonia (9)	Hienghène Sport	5	2017, **2019**, 2020, 2022, 2023
New Caledonia (9)	Mont-Dore	3	2007, 2011–12, 2012–13
New Caledonia (9)	Tiga Sport	3	2023, 2025, 2026
New Caledonia (9)	Gaïca	2	2014–15, 2024
New Caledonia (9)	Lössi	2	2016, 2018
New Caledonia (9)	Ne Drehu	1	2022
New Caledonia (9)	Baco	1	2007–08
New Caledonia (9)	Saint-Louis	1	1987
American Samoa (8)	Pago Youth	5	2012–13, 2013–14, 2018, 2019, 2026
American Samoa (8)	Utulei Youth	2	2016, 2017
American Samoa (8)	Royal Puma	1	2025
American Samoa (8)	Vaiala Tongan	1	2024
American Samoa (8)	Ilaoa and To'omata	1	2023
American Samoa (8)	SKBC	1	2014–15
American Samoa (8)	PanSa East	1	2001
American Samoa (8)	Konica	1	1999
Fiji (6)	Ba	13	1987, 2005, 2007, 2007–08, 2008–09, 2011–12, 2012–13, 2013–14, 2014–15, 2017, 2018, 2019, 2020
Fiji (6)	Lautoka	7	2009–10, 2010–11, 2018, 2019, 2020, 2022, 2024
Fiji (6)	Rewa	6	2017, 2022, 2023, 2024, 2025, 2026
Fiji (6)	Nadi	4	1999, 2006, 2013–14, 2016
Fiji (6)	Suva	3	2014–15, 2016, 2023
Fiji (6)	Labasa	1	2001
Samoa (6)	Lupe o le Soaga	5	2014–15, 2017, 2018, 2020, 2023
Samoa (6)	Kiwi	5	1999, 2012–13, 2013–14, 2016, 2019
Samoa (6)	Tuanaimato Breeze	2	2005, 2006
Samoa (6)	Vaivase-Tai	2	2024, 2026
Samoa (6)	Vaipuna	1	2025
Samoa (6)	Titavi	1	2001
Australia (4)	Sydney FC	1	**2005**
Australia (4)	Wollongong Wolves	1	**2001**
Australia (4)	South Melbourne	1	**1999**
Australia (4)	Adelaide City	1	**1987**
Cook Islands (3)	Tupapa Maraerenga	11	2001, 2012–13, 2013–14, 2016, 2018, 2019, 2020, 2023, 2024, 2025, 2026
Cook Islands (3)	Nikao Sokattack	3	2005, 2006, 2022
Cook Islands (3)	Puaikura	2	2014–15, 2017
Tonga (3)	Lotoha'apai United	8	1999, 2001, 2005, 2006, 2012–13, 2013–14, 2014–15, 2019
Tonga (3)	Veitongo	6	2016, 2017, 2018, 2020, 2023, 2024
Tonga (3)	Nukuhetulu	1	2026
Palau (Note: Palau is not an OFC member.) (1)	Koror	1	1987

== Club records ==
=== Final success rate ===
- Highest win success rate in the final (at least three finals): 100% (New Zealand) Auckland City; won all fourteen finals.
- Highest win success rate in the final (at least two finals): 100%
  - (New Zealand) Auckland City (2006, 2009, 2011, 2012, 2013, 2014, 2015, 2016, 2017, 2022, 2023, 2024, 2025, 2026)
- Five clubs have appeared in the final once, being victorious on that occasion:
  - (Australia) Adelaide City (1987)
  - (Australia) South Melbourne (1999)
  - (Australia) Wollongong Wolves (2001)
  - (Australia) Sydney FC (2005)
  - (New Caledonia) Hienghène Sport (2019)
- Three clubs played the final more than once but never won:
  - (French Polynesia) Pirae (2006, 2024)
  - (New Caledonia) Magenta (2005, 2019)
  - (Vanuatu) Amicale (2011, 2014)
- Among the clubs that won at least one final, one lost more finals than they won:
  - (New Zealand) Team Wellington one win (2018) and three losses (2015, 2016, 2017)

=== Consecutive appearances ===
- Most consecutive seasons in the OFC Club Championship: 5 – (Vanuatu) Tafea (1987 to 2006)
- Most consecutive seasons in the OFC Champions League: 19 – (New Zealand) Auckland City (2007 to 2026)

=== Biggest win ===
- Biggest margin of victory: 16
  - (New Zealand) Central United 16–0 (Tonga) Lotoha'apai United, group stage, 1999
  - (Australia) Wollongong Wolves 16–0 (Tonga) Lotoha'apai United, group stage, 2001
- Most goals scored by a team in a match: 16
  - (New Zealand) Central United 16–0 (Tonga) Lotoha'apai United, group stage, 1999
  - (Australia) Wollongong Wolves 16–0 (Tonga) Lotoha'apai United, group stage, 2001
- Biggest margin of victory in the Champions League era: 15
  - (New Zealand) Auckland City 15–0 (Cook Islands) Tupapa Maraerenga, group stage, 2019
- Biggest margin of victory in the group stage: 16
  - (New Zealand) Central United 16–0 (Tonga) Lotoha'apai United, group stage, 1999
  - (Australia) Wollongong Wolves 16–0 (Tonga) Lotoha'apai United, group stage, 2001
- Most goals scored by a team in a match: 16
  - (New Zealand) Central United 16–0 (Tonga) Lotoha'apai United, group stage, 1999
  - (Australia) Wollongong Wolves 16–0 (Tonga) Lotoha'apai United, group stage, 2001
- Biggest margin of victory in the knockout stage: 11
  - (New Zealand) Team Wellington 11–0 (Papua New Guinea) Toti City, quarter-finals, 2018
- Biggest margin of victory in the quarter-finals: 11
  - (New Zealand) Team Wellington 11–0 (Papua New Guinea) Toti City, 2018
- Biggest margin of victory in the semi-finals: 8
  - (New Zealand) Auckland City 9–1 (Fiji) Nokia Eagles, 2006
- Biggest margin of victory in a final: 6
  - (New Zealand) Team Wellington 6–0 (Fiji) Lautoka, 2018
- Biggest margin of victory for an away side in the Club Championship era: 16
  - (Australia) Wollongong Wolves 16–0 (Tonga) Lotoha'apai United, group stage, 2001
- Biggest margin of victory for an away side in the Champions League era: 15
  - (New Zealand) Auckland City 15–0 (Cook Islands) Tupapa Maraerenga, group stage, 2019
- Biggest margin of victory for an away side in the qualifying stages / preliminary rounds in Champions League: 14
  - (Cook Islands) Tupapa Maraerenga 14–0 (American Samoa) Vaiala Tonga, 2025
  - (Samoa) Vaivase-Tai 14–0 (American Samoa) Vaiala Tonga, 2025

=== Highest score ===
- Oceania Club Championship era:

Malaita Eagles (Solomon Islands) 14–2 Konica (American Samoa) (1999)
Central United (New Zealand) 16–0 Lotoha'apai United (Tonga) (1999)
Wollongong Wolves (Australia) 16–0 Lotoha'apai United (Tonga) (2001)

- OFC Champions League era:

Auckland City (New Zealand) 15–0 Tupapa Maraerenga (Cook Islands) (2019)

=== Most consecutive wins ===
- (New Zealand) Auckland City – 16 (9 April 2016 – 7 April 2018)

=== Longest undefeated run ===
- (New Zealand) Auckland City – 29 (10 May 2014 – 6 April 2019)

=== Most minutes without conceding a goal ===
- (New Zealand) Auckland City – 1,079

== Player records ==
The following records are only for the Champions League era.

=== All-time top scorers ===
As of 12 April 2025

A ‡ indicates the player was from the OFC Club Championship era.
Players that took part in the 2026 OFC Men's Champions League are highlighted in bold.
The table below does not include goals scored in the qualification stage of the competition.

Preliminary round goals not included.

Rank	Player	Club(s)	Goals
1	(Portugal) João Moreira	(New Zealand) Auckland City	19
1	(Argentina) Emiliano Tade	(New Zealand) Auckland City	19
3	(Solomon Islands) Benjamin Totori	(New Zealand) Waitakere United (8) (Solomon Islands) Koloale (6) (Solomon Islands) Western United (1) (Fiji) Lautoka (3)	18
4	(New Zealand) Daniel Koprivcic	(New Zealand) Auckland City	17
4	(Fiji) Roy Krishna	(New Zealand) Waitakere United	17
6	(Spain) Manel Expósito	(New Zealand) Auckland City	15
6	(Papua New Guinea) Kema Jack	(Papua New Guinea) Hekari United	15
6	(French Polynesia) Teaonui Tehau	(French Polynesia) Dragon (5) (French Polynesia) Pirae (1) (French Polynesia) Vénus (9)	15
9	(New Zealand) Adam Dickinson	(New Zealand) Auckland City (11) (Vanuatu) Amicale (3)	14
9	(New Zealand) Allan Pearce	(New Zealand) Waitakere United	14
9	(New Zealand) Ryan De Vries	(New Zealand) Waitakere United (6) (New Zealand) Auckland City (8)	14
12	(Vanuatu) Fenedy Masauvakalo	(Vanuatu) Amicale	13
12	(Solomon Islands) Micah Lea'alafa	(Solomon Islands) Solomon Warriors (5) (New Zealand) Auckland City (8)	13
14	(South Africa) Keryn Jordan	(New Zealand) Auckland City	12
14	(Solomon Islands) James Naka	(Solomon Islands) Kossa (4) (Solomon Islands) Koloale (2) (Solomon Islands) Solomon Warriors (3) (Solomon Islands) Western United (1) (Vanuatu) Nalkutan (2)	12
16	(Fiji) Osea Vakatalesau	(Fiji) Ba (5) (Fiji) Lautoka (2) (Papua New Guinea) Hekari United (2) (Vanuatu) Amicale (2)	11

- Last updated: 16 June 2018.

=== Top scorers by season ===
Season	Top scorer(s)	Club(s)	Goals
1987	Unknown		—N/a
1999	Unknown		—N/a
2001	(Australia) Sasho Petrovski	(New Zealand) Wollongong Wolves	13
2005	(Australia) David Zdrilic	(Australia) Sydney FC	9
2006	(Solomon Islands) Benjamin Totori	(New Zealand) YoungHeart Manawatu	7
2007	(Solomon Islands) Commins Menapi	(New Zealand) Waitakere United	5
2007–08	(New Zealand) Allan Pearce (Solomon Islands) James Naka	(New Zealand) Waitakere United (Solomon Islands) Kossa	4
2008–09	(South Africa) Keryn Jordan	(New Zealand) Auckland City	8
2009–10	(Papua New Guinea) Kema Jack (New Zealand) Daniel Koprivcic	(Papua New Guinea) Hekari United (New Zealand) Auckland City	7
2010–11	(Vanuatu) Fenedy Masauvakalo	(Vanuatu) Amicale	8
2011–12	(Spain) Manel Expósito	(New Zealand) Auckland City	6
2012–13	(Nigeria) Sanni Issa	(Fiji) Ba	9
2013–14	(Argentina) Emiliano Tade (French Polynesia) Naea Bennett	(New Zealand) Auckland City (French Polynesia) Pirae	6
2014–15	(Fiji) Saula Waqa	(Fiji) Ba	5
2016	(Portugal) João Moreira	(New Zealand) Auckland City	5
2017	(Portugal) João Moreira (New Zealand) Ryan De Vries (New Zealand) Tom Jackson	(New Zealand) Auckland City (New Zealand) Auckland City (New Zealand) Team Wellington	6
2018	(Argentina) Emiliano Tade (New Zealand) Angus Kilkolly	(New Zealand) Auckland City (New Zealand) Team Wellington	8
2019	(England) Ross Allen	(New Zealand) Team Wellington	11
2020 (Note: The 2020 tournament was abandoned after the group stage due to the COVID-19 pandemic in Oceania and the title was not awarded.)	(Uruguay) Martín Bueno	(New Zealand) Eastern Suburbs	6
2022	(French Polynesia) Teaonui Tehau	(French Polynesia) Vénus	4
2023	(New Zealand) Ryan De Vries	(New Zealand) Auckland City	5
2024	(New Caledonia) Germain Haewegene	(New Caledonia) Magenta	5
2025	(Solomon Islands) Hudson Oreinima	(Solomon Islands) Central Coast	5
2026	(Brazil) Medina	(Vanuatu) Galaxy	11

Most goals in a single match

- 7 goals:
  - (Australia) Sasho Petrovski (Wollongong Wolves), 16–0 against Lotohaʻapai United, group stage, 2001
  - (Cook Islands) Lee Harmon (Tupapa Maraerenga), 14–0 against Vaiala Tonga, qualifying stage, 2024
- 6 goals:
  - (England) Ross Allen (Team Wellington), 13–0 against Kiwi, group stage, 2019

Most goals in a single season

- 13 goals:
  - (Australia) Sasho Petrovski (2001)
- 11 goals:
  - (England) Ross Allen (2019)
  - (Brazil) Medina (2026)

== List of hat-tricks ==
As of 22 August 2026

Key
^{4}	Player scored four goals
^{5}	Player scored five goals
^{6}	Player scored sıx goals

No.	Player	For	Against	Score	Date
1	(New Caledonia) Michel Hmaé (1)	(New Caledonia) Magenta	(Cook Islands) Nikao Sokattack	4–0	10 February 2005
2	(Solomon Islands) Alick Maemae	(Solomon Islands) Makuru	(Fiji) Ba	4–1	6 April 2005
3	(French Polynesia) Naea Bennett (1)	(French Polynesia) Pirae	(Papua New Guinea) Sobou	5–1	31 May 2005
4	(Australia) Sasho Petrovski	(Australia) Sydney FC	(Papua New Guinea) Sobou	9–2	2 June 2005
5	(Australia) David Zdrilic (1)	(Australia) Sydney FC	(Papua New Guinea) Sobou	9–2	2 June 2005
6	(Australia) David Zdrilic^{4} (2)	(Australia) Sydney FC	(French Polynesia) Pirae	6–0	4 June 2005
7	(New Caledonia) Michel Hmaé (2)	(New Caledonia) Magenta	(Solomon Islands) Makuru	5–0	5 June 2005
8	(French Polynesia) Jose Hmaé	(French Polynesia) Pirae	(Solomon Islands) Marist	10–1	10 May 2006
9	(French Polynesia) Naea Bennett^{4} (2)	(French Polynesia) Pirae	(Solomon Islands) Marist	10–1	10 May 2006
10	(French Polynesia) Alex Williams	(French Polynesia) Pirae	(Papua New Guinea) Sobou	7–0	14 May 2006
11	(Solomon Islands) Jack Samani	(Solomon Islands) Marist	(Papua New Guinea) Sobou	7–1	16 May 2006
12	(Solomon Islands) Benjamin Totori (1)	(New Zealand) Young Heart Manawatu	(Fiji) Nokia Eagles	4–0	21 May 2006
13	(South Africa) Keryn Jordan (1)	(New Zealand) Auckland City	(French Polynesia) Pirae	3–1	21 May 2006
14	(Vanuatu) Jean Nako Naprapol	(Vanuatu) Tafea	(New Caledonia) Baco	5–0	16 June 2007
15	(New Zealand) Chad Coombes	(New Zealand) Auckland City	(Vanuatu) Port Vila Sharks	8–1	14 February 2009
16	(South Africa) Keryn Jordan (2)	(New Zealand) Auckland City	(Solomon Islands) Koloale	7–2	25 April 2009
17	(Croatia) Daniel Koprivcic	(New Zealand) Auckland City	(French Polynesia) Manu Ura	5–0	17 October 2009
18	(Solomon Islands) Benjamin Totori (2)	(Solomon Islands) Koloale	(Fiji) Lautoka	6–1	5 February 2011
19	(Vanuatu) Fenedy Masauvakalo	(Vanuatu) Amicale	(Fiji) Lautoka	5–1	26 February 2011
20	(New Zealand) Ryan De Vries (1)	(New Zealand) Waitekere United	(French Polynesia) Tefana	10–0	29 October 2011
21	(Fiji) Roy Krishna^{5}	(New Zealand) Waitekere United	(French Polynesia) Tefana	10–0	29 October 2011
22	(Tonga) Timote Maamaaloa	(Tonga) Lotoha'apai	(American Samoa) Pago Youth	6–0	3 May 2012
23	(Cook Islands) Leo Berlim^{4}	(Cook Islands) Tupapa Maraerenga	(American Samoa) Pago Youth	9–0	5 May 2012
24	(England) Adam Dickinson	(New Zealand) Auckland City	(New Caledonia) Mont-Dore	12–2	13 April 2013
25	(Nigeria) Sanni Issa	(Fiji) Ba	(Solomon Islands) Solomon Warriors	5–0	17 April 2013
26	(Samoa) Joseph Gaughan	(Samoa) Kiwi	(American Samoa) Pago Youth	5–1	16 October 2013
27	(New Zealand) Sam Margetts^{4}	(Cook Islands) Tupapa Maraerenga	(American Samoa) Pago Youth	11–1	17 October 2013
28	(Serbia) Nikola Vasilić	(Vanuatu) Amicale	(Fiji) Nadi	6–0	11 April 2014
29	(French Polynesia) Naea Bennett (3)	(French Polynesia) Pirae	(Samoa) Kiwi	8–0	12 April 2014
30	(Solomon Islands) Micah Lea'alafa^{4}	(Solomon Islands) Solomon Warriors	(Samoa) Kiwi	8–0	15 April 2014
31	(Samoa) Silao Malo	(Samoa) Lupe Ole Soaga	(American Samoa) SKBC	6–0	11 October 2014
32	(Fiji) Saula Waqa	(Fiji) Ba	(Samoa) Lupe Ole Soaga	3–1	14 April 2015
33	(Portugal) João Moreira (1)	(New Zealand) Auckland City	(Vanuatu) Amicale	3–0	18 April 2015
34	(New Zealand) Jared Colligan^{4}	(Cook Islands) Tupapa Maraerenga	(Tonga) Veitongo	7–0	26 January 2016
35	(Cook Islands) Campbell Best	(Cook Islands) Tupapa Maraerenga	(American Samoa) Utulei Youth	9–1	30 January 2016
36	(Cook Islands) Josh Karika	(Cook Islands) Tupapa Maraerenga	(American Samoa) Utulei Youth	9–1	30 January 2016
37	(New Zealand) Jamie Mason	(Samoa) Kiwi	(Tonga) Veitongo	7–1	30 January 2016
38	(Cook Islands) Sam Blackburn	(Samoa) Kiwi	(Tonga) Veitongo	7–1	30 January 2016
39	(Portugal) João Moreira (2)	(New Zealand) Auckland City	(Solomon Islands) Solomon Warriors	4–0	10 April 2016
40	(New Caledonia) Georges Bearune	(New Caledonia) Magenta	(French Polynesia) Tefana	4–2	11 April 2016
41	(Fiji) Anish Khem^{4}	(Fiji) Nadi	(Samoa) Kiwi	3–4	11 April 2016
42	(New Zealand) Tom Jackson	(New Zealand) Team Wellington	(Fiji) Ba	8–0	4 March 2017
43	(New Zealand) Ryan De Vries^{4} (2)	(New Zealand) Auckland City	(Vanuatu) Malampa Revivors	11–0	18 March 2017
44	(Portugal) João Moreira (3)	(New Zealand) Auckland City	(Vanuatu) Malampa Revivors	11–0	18 March 2017
45	(Cook Islands) Seam Latimer	(Cook Islands) Tupapa Maraerenga	(Tonga) Veitongo	2–9	23 January 2018
46	(Cook Islands) Maro Bonsu-Maro (1)	(Cook Islands) Tupapa Maraerenga	(Tonga) Veitongo	2–9	23 January 2018
47	(Samoa) Suivai Ataga	(Samoa) Lupe Ole Soaga	(American Samoa) Pago Youth	1–13	23 January 2018
48	(Papua New Guinea) Raymond Gunemba^{4} (1)	(Papua New Guinea) Toti City	(Cook Islands) Tupapa Maraerenga	2–7	10 February 2018
49	(Solomon Islands) Gagame Feni	(Solomon Islands) Solomon Warriors	(New Caledonia) Lössi	6–1	14 February 2018
50	(Fiji) Samuela Nabenia	(Fiji) Ba	(Cook Islands) Tupapa Maraerenga	4–1	16 February 2018
51	(Vanuatu) Azariah Soromon	(Vanuatu) Nalkutan	(Papua New Guinea) Toti City	1–4	16 February 2018
52	(Argentina) Emiliano Tade	(New Zealand) Auckland City	(French Polynesia) Venus	0–7	25 February 2018
53	(England) Ross Allen (1)	(New Zealand) Team Wellington	(Samoa) Lupe Ole Soaga	7–1	27 February 2018
54	(New Zealand) Nathanael Hailemariam (1)	(New Zealand) Team Wellington	(Papua New Guinea) Toti City	11–0	7 April 2018
55	(New Zealand) Angus Kilkolly^{4}	(New Zealand) Team Wellington	(Papua New Guinea) Toti City	11–0	7 April 2018
56	(Tonga) Tuia Falepapalangi	(Tonga) Lotoha'apai	(American Samoa) Pago Youth	1–5	26 January 2019
57	(American Samoa) Palauni Tapusoa	(American Samoa) Pago Youth	(Samoa) Kiwi	4–3	29 January 2019
58	(Samoa) Paulo Scanlan^{4}	(Samoa) Kiwi	(Tonga) Lotoha'apai	1–9	1 February 2019
59	(New Caledonia) Bertrand Kaï	(New Caledonia) Hienghéne Sport	(Vanuatu) Malampa Revivors	0–5	10 February 2019
60	(Papua New Guinea) Raymond Gunemba (2)	(Papua New Guinea) Toti City	(Vanuatu) Malampa Revivors	2–4	13 February 2019
61	(French Polynesia) Sylvain Graglia^{4}	(French Polynesia) Central Sport	(Papua New Guinea) Morobe Wawens	0–7	13 February 2019
62	(New Zealand) Nathanael Hailemariam (2)	(New Zealand) Team Wellington	(Samoa) Kiwi	0–13	26 February 2019
63	(England) Ross Allen^{6} (2)	(New Zealand) Team Wellington	(Samoa) Kiwi	0–13	26 February 2019
64	(Colombia) Omar Guardiola	(New Zealand) Auckland City	(Cook Islands) Tupapa Maraerenga	0–15	27 February 2019
65	(Mexico) Fabrizio Tavano	(New Zealand) Auckland City	(Cook Islands) Tupapa Maraerenga	0–15	27 February 2019
66	(Cook Islands) Maro Bonsu-Maro^{4} (2)	(New Zealand) Auckland City	(Cook Islands) Tupapa Maraerenga	0–15	27 February 2019
67	(New Caledonia) Yorick Hnautra^{4}	(New Caledonia) Magenta	(Cook Islands) Tupapa Maraerenga	10–1	2 March 2019
68	(Papua New Guinea) David Browne	(New Zealand) Auckland City	(Papua New Guinea) Toti City	4–0	6 April 2019
69	(New Caledonia) Kevin Nemia	(New Caledonia) Magenta	(French Polynesia) Central Sport	0–8	7 April 2019
70	(England) Ross Allen (3)	(New Zealand) Team Wellington	(Solomon Islands) Henderson Eels	6–1	7 April 2019
71	(Vanuatu) Andre Batick	(Vanuatu) Malampa Revivors	(Papua New Guinea) Lae City	3–0	21 February 2020
72	(French Polynesia) Tamatoa Tetauira (1)	(French Polynesia) Venus	(Samoa) Lupe Ole Soaga	0–6	1 March 2020
73	(French Polynesia) Teaonui Tehau (1)	(French Polynesia) Venus	(Fiji) Ba	4–2	7 March 2020
74	(French Polynesia) Teaonui Tehau (2)	(French Polynesia) Venus	(Solomon Islands) Central Coast	0–3	4 August 2022
75	(Samoa) Michael Tumua Leo^{5}	(Samoa) Lupe Ole Soaga	(American Samoa) Ilaoa & To'omata	13–0	18 February 2023
76	(French Polynesia) Tamatoa Tetauira (2)	(French Polynesia) Pirae	(French Polynesia) Dragon	7–3	14 February 2023
77	(Argentina) Emiliano Tade (2)	(New Zealand) Auckland City	(New Zealand) Wellington Olimpic	5–3	18 March 2023
78	(Tonga) Sione Uhatahi	(Tonga) Veitongo	(American Samoa) Vaiala Tongan	13–0	17 February 2024
79	(Tonga) Elias Kendler	(Tonga) Veitongo	(American Samoa) Vaiala Tongan	13–0	17 February 2024
80	(Cook Islands) Lee Harmon^{7}	(Cook Islands) Tupapa Maraerenga	(American Samoa) Vaiala Tongan	14–0	20 February 2024
81	(Samoa) Falaniko Nanumea^{4}	(Samoa) Vaivase-Tai	(American Samoa) Vaiala Tongan	0–14	23 February 2024
82	(Samoa) Dilo Tumua^{5}	(Samoa) Vaivase-Tai	(American Samoa) Vaiala Tongan	0–14	23 February 2024
83	(Samoa) Vaa Taualai	(Samoa) Vaivase-Tai	(American Samoa) Vaiala Tongan	0–14	23 February 2024
84	(New Caledonia) Germain Haewegene^{5}	(New Caledonia) Magenta	(Samoa) Vaivase-Tai	8–0	15 May 2024
85	(New Zealand) Dylan Manickum	(New Zealand) Auckland City	(Solomon Islands) Solomon Warriors	5–0	17 May 2024
86	(Solomon Islands) Hudson Oreinima^{5}	(Solomon Islands) Central Coast	(Cook Islands) Tupapa Maraerenga	7–0	3 April 2025
87	(Papua New Guinea) Rex Naime	(Papua New Guinea) Hekari United	(Cook Islands) Tupapa Maraerenga	9–0	6 April 2025
88	(Brazil) Medina (1)	(Vanuatu) Galaxy	(Fiji) Rewa	4–1	9 August 2026
89	(Brazil) Medina (2)	(Vanuatu) Galaxy	(Papua New Guinea) Lae City	3–1	12 August 2026
90	(Brazil) Medina (3)	(Vanuatu) Galaxy	(Cook Islands) Tupapa Maraerenga	7–1	15 August 2026
91	(Solomon Islands) Raphael Lea'i	(Solomon Islands) Central Coast	(Vanuatu) Galaxy	3–2	19 August 2026

=== Hat-tricks by player ===
Rank	Player	Hat-tricks
1	(England) Ross Allen	3
1	(French Polynesia) Naea Bennett	3
1	(Portugal) João Moreira	3
1	(Brazil) Medina	3
5	(Argentina) Emiliano Tade	2
5	(Cook Islands) Maro Bonsu-Maro	2
5	(New Zealand) Ryan De Vries	2
5	(Papua New Guinea) Raymond Gunemba	2
5	(New Zealand) Nathanael Hailemariam	2
5	(New Caledonia) Michel Hmaé	2
5	(South Africa) Keryn Jordan	2
5	(French Polynesia) Teaonui Tehau	2
5	(French Polynesia) Tamatoa Tetauira	2
5	(Solomon Islands) Benjamin Totori	2
5	(Australia) David Zdrilic	2
16	55 players	1

=== Hat-tricks by club ===
Rank	Club	Hat-tricks
1	(New Zealand) Auckland City	16
2	(Cook Islands) Tupapa Maraerenga	8
3	(New Zealand) Team Wellington	7
4	(French Polynesia) Pirae	6
4	(New Caledonia) Magenta	6
6	(Samoa) Kiwi	4
7	(Fiji) Ba	3
7	(Samoa) Vaivase-Tai	3
7	(Samoa) Lupe o le Soaga	3
7	(Australia) Sydney FC	3
7	(French Polynesia) Vénus	3
7	(Vanuatu) Galaxy	3
13	(Vanuatu) Amicale	2
13	(Tonga) Lotoha'apai United	2
13	(Solomon Islands) Solomon Warriors	2
13	(Papua New Guinea) Toti City	2
13	(Tonga) Veitongo	2
13	(New Zealand) Waitakere United	2
13	(Solomon Islands) Central Coast	2
20	(French Polynesia) Central Sport	1
20	(New Caledonia) Hienghène Sport	1
20	(Solomon Islands) Koloale	1
20	(Solomon Islands) Makuru	1
20	(Vanuatu) Malampa Revivors	1
20	(Solomon Islands) Marist	1
20	(Fiji) Nadi	1
20	(Vanuatu) Nalkutan	1
20	(American Samoa) Pago Youth	1
20	(Vanuatu) Tafea	1
20	(New Zealand) Youth Heart Mount	1
20	(Papua New Guinea) Hekari United	1

=== Hat-tricks by nationality ===
Rank	Nation	Hat-tricks
1	New Zealand	9
2	Samoa	8
3	Cook Islands	7
3	Solomon Islands	7
5	New Caledonia	6
5	Tahiti	6
7	Fiji	4
7	Tonga	4
7	Vanuatu	4
10	Brazil	3
10	Papua New Guinea	3
12	Australia	2
12	England	2
14	American Samoa	1
14	Argentina	1
14	Croatia	1
14	Mexico	1
14	Nigeria	1
14	Portugal	1
14	Serbia	1
14	South Africa	1

== Winning managers ==
Season	Manager	Club
Oceania Club Championship era
1987	(Socialist Federal Republic of Yugoslavia) Zoran Matić	(Australia) Adelaide City
1999	(Australia) Ange Postecoglou	(Australia) South Melbourne
2001	(Australia) Ron Corry	(Australia) Wollongong Wolves
2005	(Germany) Pierre Littbarski	(Australia) Sydney FC
2006	(New Zealand) Allan Jones	(New Zealand) Auckland City
OFC Champions League era
2007	(New Zealand) Steve Cain	(New Zealand) Waitakere United
2007–08	(New Zealand) Chris Milicich	(New Zealand) Waitakere United
2008–09	(New Zealand) Paul Posa	(New Zealand) Auckland City
2009–10	(Solomon Islands) Jerry Allen	(Papua New Guinea) Hekari United
2010–11	(Spain) Ramon Tribulietx & (New Zealand) Aaron McFarland	(New Zealand) Auckland City
2011–12	(Spain) Ramon Tribulietx	(New Zealand) Auckland City
2012–13	(Spain) Ramon Tribulietx	(New Zealand) Auckland City
2013–14	(Spain) Ramon Tribulietx	(New Zealand) Auckland City
2014–15	(Spain) Ramon Tribulietx	(New Zealand) Auckland City
2016	(Spain) Ramon Tribulietx	(New Zealand) Auckland City
2017	(Spain) Ramon Tribulietx	(New Zealand) Auckland City
2018	(England) José Figueira	(New Zealand) Team Wellington
2019	(French Polynesia) Félix Tagawa	(New Caledonia) Hienghène Sport
2022	(Spain) Albert Riera	(New Zealand) Auckland City
2023	(Spain) Albert Riera	(New Zealand) Auckland City
2024	(Spain) Albert Riera	(New Zealand) Auckland City
2025	(New Zealand) Paul Posa	(New Zealand) Auckland City
2026	(Czech Republic) Rudy Mozr	(New Zealand) Auckland City
