= Auckland City FC in international football =

New Zealand club in international football

Auckland City in international football
- Club: Auckland City
- Seasons played: 21
- Most appearances: Ryan de Vries (63)
- Top scorer: Emiliano Tade (31)
- First entry: 2005 Oceania Club Championship
- Latest entry: 2026 OFC Men's Champions League

Titles
- Champions League: 14: 2006; 2009; 2011; 2012; 2013; 2014; 2015; 2016; 2017; 2022; 2023; 2024; 2025; 2026

Auckland City Football Club is a New Zealand semi-professional football club based in Sandringham, Auckland. The club's involvement in international competitions dates back 2005. As New Zealand champions, City were invited to participate in the fourth OFC Club Championship. They were originally scheduled to debut against Manumea who withdrew from qualifying. City eventually made their debut against Sydney FC in the group stage.

Auckland City won their first Oceania title in the following year, defeating Pirae in the final. Between 2010 and 2017 City won seven consecutive titles. They are presently New Zealand's most successful club in OFC competitions, with 13 trophies in total. They currently hold the record for the most appearances at the FIFA Club World Cup with 12 appearances.

Emiliano Tade holds the club record for appearances and goals in Oceanian competitions with 41 appearances and 31 goals.

== Records ==
- First international match: Sydney FC v. Auckland City, 2005 Oceania Club Championship, 31 May 2005
- Biggest win in international competitions: 15–0, Tupapa Maraerenga v. Auckland City, 2019 OFC Champions League, 27 February 2019
- Biggest defeat in international competitions: 10–0, FC Bayern Munchen vs Auckland City, 2025 FIFA Club World Cup, 15 June 2025.
- Most appearances in international competitions: Ryan de Vries, 63
- Most goals in international competitions: Emiliano Tade, 31

== Matches ==
All results (home, away and neutral) list Auckland City's goal tally first.

Colour key

Wins
Draws
Losses
Competition winners
Competition runners-up

Key

- N = Neutral venue
- a.e.t. = After extra time
- a = Away goals rule
- p = Penalty shoot-out

Auckland City FC results in international competitions
Season	Competition	Round	Opposition	Home	Away	Aggregate
2005	OFC Club Championship	PR	(American Samoa) Manumea	w/d (Note: Auckland City received a bye because Manumea were withdrawn by the Oceania Football Confederation.)		
2005	OFC Club Championship	Group A	(Australia) Sydney FC	2–3		3rd
2005	OFC Club Championship	Group A	(French Polynesia) AS Pirae	0–1		3rd
2005	OFC Club Championship	Group A	(Papua New Guinea) Sobou	6–1		3rd
2006	OFC Club Championship	Group A	(Papua New Guinea) Sobou	7–0		1st
2006	OFC Club Championship	Group A	(Solomon Islands) Marist Fire	3–1		1st
2006	OFC Club Championship	Group A	(French Polynesia) AS Pirae	1–0		1st
2006	OFC Club Championship	SF	(Fiji) Nokia Eagles	9–1 (N)		
2006	OFC Club Championship	Final	(French Polynesia) AS Pirae	3–1 (N)		
2006	FIFA Club World Cup	Quarter-final	(Egypt) Al-Ahly	0–2 (N)		
2006	FIFA Club World Cup	Fifth place play-off	(South Korea) Jeonbuk Hyundai Motors	0–3 (N)		
2007	OFC Champions League	Group A	(New Zealand) Waitakere United	2–2	2–2	2nd
2007	OFC Champions League	Group A	(New Caledonia) Mont-Dore	4–0	2–0	2nd
2007–08	OFC Champions League	Group A	(New Zealand) Waitakere United	0–1	1–1	2nd
2007–08	OFC Champions League	Group A	(French Polynesia) A.S. Manu-Ura	6–0	1–0	2nd
2008–09	OFC Champions League	Group A	(New Zealand) Waitakere United	2–2	3–1	1st
2008–09	OFC Champions League	Group A	(Vanuatu) Port Vila Sharks	8–1	2–0	1st
2008–09	OFC Champions League	Final	(Solomon Islands) Koloale	2–2	7–2	9–4
2009	FIFA Club World Cup	Play-off for quarter-finals	(United Arab Emirates) Al-Ahli	2–0 (N)		
2009	FIFA Club World Cup	Quarter-final	(Mexico) Atlante	0–3 (N)		
2009	FIFA Club World Cup	Match for fifth place	(Democratic Republic of the Congo) TP Mazembe	3–2 (N)		
2009–10	OFC Champions League	Group A	(New Zealand) Waitakere United	2–2	1–1	2nd
2009–10	OFC Champions League	Group A	(New Caledonia) AS Magenta	2–1	1–1	2nd
2009–10	OFC Champions League	Group A	(French Polynesia) A.S. Manu-Ura	5–0	2–0	2nd
2010–11	OFC Champions League	Group B	(New Caledonia) AS Magenta	3–0	1–0	1st
2010–11	OFC Champions League	Group B	(New Zealand) Waitakere United	1–1	1–0	1st
2010–11	OFC Champions League	Group B	(French Polynesia) A.S. Tefana	1–1	5–0	1st
2010–11	OFC Champions League	Final	(Vanuatu) Amicale	2–1	4–0	6–1
2011	FIFA Club World Cup	Play-off for quarter-finals	(Japan) Kashiwa Reysol	0–2 (N)		
2011–12	OFC Champions League	Group B	(Papua New Guinea) Hekari United	2–0	1–1	1st
2011–12	OFC Champions League	Group B	(Solomon Islands) Koloale	7–3	4–1	1st
2011–12	OFC Champions League	Group B	(Vanuatu) Amicale	3–2	0–1	1st
2011–12	OFC Champions League	Final	(French Polynesia) A.S. Tefana	2–1	1–0	3–1
2012	FIFA Club World Cup	Play-off for quarter-finals	(Japan) Sanfrecce Hiroshima	0–1 (N)		
2012–13	OFC Champions League	Group B	(New Zealand) Waitakere United	0–1	3–1	2nd
2012–13	OFC Champions League	Group B	(French Polynesia) A.S. Dragon	1–3	1–1	2nd
2012–13	OFC Champions League	Group B	(New Caledonia) Mont-Dore	12–2	2–0	2nd
2012–13	OFC Champions League	SF	(Fiji) Ba	6–1	1–0	7–1
2012–13	OFC Champions League	Final	(New Zealand) Waitakere United	2–1 (N)		
2013	FIFA Club World Cup	Play-off for quarter-finals	(Morocco) Raja Casablanca	1–2 (N)		
2013–14	OFC Champions League	Group B	(Fiji) Nadi	3–0		2nd
2013–14	OFC Champions League	Group B	(French Polynesia) A.S. Dragon	3–0		2nd
2013–14	OFC Champions League	Group B	(Vanuatu) Amicale	0–1		2nd
2013–14	OFC Champions League	SF	(French Polynesia) AS Pirae	3–0	1–2	4–2
2013–14	OFC Champions League	Final	(Vanuatu) Amicale	2–1	1–1	3–2
2014	OFC President's Cup	Group A	Singapore U23	4–0		1st
2014	OFC President's Cup	Group A	(Cayman Islands) Bodden Town	9–0		1st
2014	OFC President's Cup	Final	(Vanuatu) Amicale	2–1 (N)		
2014	FIFA Club World Cup	Play-off for quarter-finals	(Morocco) Moghreb Tetouan	0–0 (4–3 p) (N)		
2014	FIFA Club World Cup	Quarter-final	(Algeria) ES Sétif	1–0 (N)		
2014	FIFA Club World Cup	Semi-final	(Argentina) San Lorenzo	1–2 (a.e.t.) (N)		
2014	FIFA Club World Cup	Match for third place	(Mexico) Cruz Azul	1–1 (4–2 p) (N)		
2014–15	OFC Champions League	Group B	(Fiji) Suva	3–0		1st
2014–15	OFC Champions League	Group B	(Solomon Islands) Western United	3–0		1st
2014–15	OFC Champions League	Group B	(Vanuatu) Amicale	3–0		1st
2014–15	OFC Champions League	SF	(New Caledonia) Gaïtcha FCN	1–0 (N)		
2014–15	OFC Champions League	Final	(New Zealand) Team Wellington	1–1 (a.e.t.) (4–3 p) (N)		
2015	FIFA Club World Cup	Play-off for quarter-finals	(Japan) Sanfrecce Hiroshima	0–2 (N)		
2016	OFC Champions League	Group A	(Papua New Guinea) Lae City Dwellers	2–1		1st
2016	OFC Champions League	Group A	(Solomon Islands) Solomon Warriors	4–0		1st
2016	OFC Champions League	Group A	(Vanuatu) Amicale	3–1		1st
2016	OFC Champions League	SF	(French Polynesia) A.S. Tefana	4–2 (N)		
2016	OFC Champions League	Final	(New Zealand) Team Wellington	3–0 (N)		
2016	FIFA Club World Cup	Play-off for quarter-finals	(Japan) Kashima Antlers	1–2 (N)		
2017	OFC Champions League	Group C	(Papua New Guinea) Lae City Dwellers	2–0		1st
2017	OFC Champions League	Group C	(Solomon Islands) Western United	2–1		1st
2017	OFC Champions League	Group C	(Vanuatu) Malampa Revivors	11–0		1st
2017	OFC Champions League	SF	(French Polynesia) A.S. Tefana	2–0	2–0	4–0
2017	OFC Champions League	Final	(New Zealand) Team Wellington	3–0	2–0	5–0
2017	FIFA Club World Cup	Play-off for quarter-finals	(United Arab Emirates) Al-Jazira	0–1 (N)		
2018	OFC Champions League	Group C	(French Polynesia) Vénus	7–0		1st
2018	OFC Champions League	Group C	(Papua New Guinea) Madang	5–0		1st
2018	OFC Champions League	Group C	(Fiji) Lautoka	1–0		1st
2018	OFC Champions League	QF	(Solomon Islands) Solomon Warriors	2–0	—N/a	—N/a
2018	OFC Champions League	SF	(New Zealand) Team Wellington	0–0	2–2	2–2 (a)
2019	OFC Champions League	Group D	(New Caledonia) AS Magenta	2–1		1st
2019	OFC Champions League	Group D	(Cook Islands) Tupapa Maraerenga	15–0		1st
2019	OFC Champions League	Group D	(Solomon Islands) Solomon Warriors	6–0		1st
2019	OFC Champions League	QF	(Papua New Guinea) Toti City	4–0	—N/a	—N/a
2019	OFC Champions League	SF	(New Caledonia) AS Magenta	—N/a	1–2	—N/a
2020	OFC Champions League	Group D (Note: On 4 September 2020, OFC announced that the competition was abandoned due to the COVID-19 pandemic.)	(Fiji) Ba	6–0		1st
2020	OFC Champions League	Group D	(French Polynesia) Vénus	1–0		1st
2020	OFC Champions League	Group D	(Samoa) Lupe o le Soaga	2–0		1st
2020	FIFA Club World Cup	Withdrew due to COVID-19 pandemic				
2022	OFC Champions League	Group B	(New Caledonia) Hienghène Sport	5–0		1st
2022	OFC Champions League	Group B	(Fiji) Rewa	3–0		1st
2022	OFC Champions League	Group B	(Cook Islands) Nikao Sokattack	4–1		1st
2022	OFC Champions League	SF	(Solomon Islands) Central Coast	2–0 (N)		
2022	OFC Champions League	Final	(French Polynesia) Vénus	3–0 (N)		
2022	FIFA Club World Cup	Play-off for quarter-finals	(Egypt) Al Ahly	0–3 (N)		
2023	OFC Champions League	National PO	(New Zealand) Wellington Olympic	5–3	1–1	6–4
2023	OFC Champions League	Group A	(Solomon Islands) Solomon Warriors	3–1		1st
2023	OFC Champions League	Group A	(Fiji) Suva	3–1		1st
2023	OFC Champions League	Group A	(Samoa) Lupe o le Soaga	3–0 (w/d (Note: The Lupe ole Soaga v Auckland City match was cancelled due to injuries in the Lupe ole Soaga squad. Lupe ole Soaga SC will have all its matches cancelled and considered null and void. OFC will award victory and the resultant three points to the opposing team as well as the score of 3–0.))		1st
2023	OFC Champions League	SF	(Vanuatu) Ifira Black Bird	2–2 (a.e.t.) (5–4 p) (N)		
2023	OFC Champions League	Final	(Fiji) Suva	4–2 (a.e.t.) (N)		
2023	FIFA Club World Cup	Play-off for quarter-finals	(Saudi Arabia) Al-Ittihad	0–3 (N)		
2024	OFC Champions League	National PO	(New Zealand) Wellington Olympic	1–0	3–3	4–3
2024	OFC Champions League	Group A	(Fiji) Rewa	2–2		1st
2024	OFC Champions League	Group A	(Papua New Guinea) Hekari United	1–0		1st
2024	OFC Champions League	Group A	(Solomon Islands) Solomon Warriors	5–0		1st
2024	OFC Champions League	SF	(New Caledonia) AS Magenta	1–0 (N)		
2024	OFC Champions League	Final	(French Polynesia) AS Pirae	4–0 (N)		
2024	FIFA Intercontinental Cup	African–Asian–Pacific Cup play-off	(United Arab Emirates) Al Ain	—N/a	2–6	—N/a
2025	OFC Champions League	Group A	(French Polynesia) AS Pirae	1–0		1st
2025	OFC Champions League	Group A	(New Caledonia) Tiga Sport	2–0		1st
2025	OFC Champions League	Group A	(Fiji) Rewa	1–1		1st
2025	OFC Champions League	SF	(Vanuatu) Ifira Black Bird	2–0 (N)		
2025	OFC Champions League	Final	(Papua New Guinea) Hekari United	2–0 (N)		
2025	FIFA Club World Cup	Group C	(Germany) Bayern Munich	0–10 (N)		4th
2025	FIFA Club World Cup	Group C	(Portugal) Benfica	0–6 (N)		4th
2025	FIFA Club World Cup	Group C	(Argentina) Boca Juniors	1–1 (N)		4th
2025	FIFA Intercontinental Cup	African–Asian–Pacific Cup play-off	(Egypt) Pyramids	—N/a	0–3	—N/a
2026	OFC Champions League	Group A	(Solomon Islands) Central Coast	2–1		1st
2026	OFC Champions League	Group A	(New Caledonia) Tiga Sport	1–0		1st
2026	OFC Champions League	Group A	(French Polynesia) Vénus	4–3		1st
2026	OFC Champions League	SF	(Fiji) Rewa	3–1 (A)		
2026	OFC Champions League	Final	(Solomon Islands) Central Coast	2–0 (N)		

== Overall record ==
All statistics are correct as of 22 August 2026.

Including matches in OFC Club Championship / OFC Champions League, OFC President's Cup, FIFA Club World Cup, FIFA Intercontinental Cup, and each competition's associated qualifying rounds.

Colour key

Positive balance (more wins)
Neutral balance (equal W/L ratio)
Negative balance (more losses)

=== By competition ===
Auckland City FC record in international football by competition
Competition	Apps	Games	Wins	Draws	Losses	GF	GA	GD	Win%
OFC Champions League	21	121	91	21	9	345	87	+258	75.21
OFC President's Cup	1	3	3	0	0	15	1	+14	100.00
FIFA Club World Cup	12	20	3	3	14	11	46	−35	15.00
FIFA Intercontinental Cup	2	2	0	0	2	2	9	−7	0.00
Total	36	146	97	24	25	373	143	+230	66.44

=== By country ===
Auckland City FC record in international football by country
Country	Pld	W	D	L	GF	GA	GD	Win%
Algeria	1	1	0	0	1	0	+1	100.00
American Samoa (Note: Auckland City were awarded the victory against Manumea in the 2005 Oceania Club Championship.)	1	1	0	0	0	0	+0	100.00
Argentina	2	0	1	1	2	3	−1	0.00
Australia	1	0	0	1	2	3	−1	0.00
Cayman Islands	1	1	0	0	9	0	+9	100.00
Cook Islands	2	2	0	0	19	1	+18	100.00
DR Congo	1	1	0	0	3	2	+1	100.00
Egypt	3	0	0	3	0	8	−8	0.00
Fiji	13	11	2	0	45	9	+36	84.62
Germany	1	0	0	1	0	10	−10	0.00
Japan	4	0	0	4	1	7	−6	0.00
Korea Republic	1	0	0	1	0	3	−3	0.00
Mexico	2	0	1	1	1	4	−3	0.00
Morocco	2	0	1	1	1	2	−1	0.00
New Caledonia	15	13	1	1	40	7	+33	86.67
New Zealand	23	9	12	2	41	26	+15	39.13
Papua New Guinea	10	9	1	0	32	3	+29	90.00
Portugal	1	0	0	1	0	6	−6	0.00
Samoa	2	2	0	0	5	0	+5	100.00
Saudi Arabia	1	0	0	1	0	3	−3	0.00
Singapore	1	1	0	0	4	0	+4	100.00
Solomon Islands	15	14	1	0	54	12	+42	93.33
Tahiti	25	20	2	3	64	15	+49	80.00
United Arab Emirates	3	1	0	2	4	7	−3	33.33
Vanuatu	15	11	2	2	45	12	+33	73.33
Total (25 countries)	146	97	24	25	373	143	+230	66.44

=== By team ===
Auckland City FC record in international football by team
Team	Country	Pld	W	D	L	GF	GA	GD	Win%
Al-Ahli	United Arab Emirates	1	1	0	0	2	0	+2	100.00
Al Ahly	Egypt	2	0	0	2	0	5	−5	0.00
Al Ain	United Arab Emirates	1	0	0	1	2	6	−4	0.00
Al-Ittihad	Saudi Arabia	1	0	0	1	0	3	−3	0.00
Al-Jazira	United Arab Emirates	1	0	0	1	0	1	−1	0.00
Amicale	Vanuatu	10	7	1	2	20	9	+11	70.00
AS Dragon	Tahiti	3	1	1	1	5	4	+1	33.33
AS Magenta	New Caledonia	7	5	1	1	11	5	+6	71.43
AS Manu-Ura	Tahiti	4	4	0	0	14	0	+14	100.00
AS Pirae	Tahiti	7	5	0	2	13	4	+9	71.43
AS Tefana	Tahiti	7	6	1	0	17	4	+13	85.71
Atlante	Mexico	1	0	0	1	0	3	−3	0.00
Ba	Fiji	3	3	0	0	13	1	+12	100.00
Bayern Munich	Germany	1	0	0	1	0	10	−10	0.00
Benfica	Portugal	1	0	0	1	0	6	−6	0.00
Boca Juniors	Argentina	1	0	1	0	1	1	+0	0.00
Bodden Town	Cayman Islands	1	1	0	0	9	0	+9	100.00
Central Coast	Solomon Islands	3	3	0	0	6	1	+5	100.00
Cruz Azul	Mexico	1	0	1	0	1	1	+0	0.00
ES Sétif	Algeria	1	1	0	0	1	0	+1	100.00
Gaïtcha FCN	New Caledonia	1	1	0	0	1	0	+1	100.00
Hekari United	Papua New Guinea	4	3	1	0	6	1	+5	75.00
Hienghène Sport	New Caledonia	1	1	0	0	5	0	+5	100.00
Ifira Black Bird	Vanuatu	2	1	1	0	4	2	+2	50.00
Jeonbuk Hyundai Motors	Korea Republic	1	0	0	1	0	3	−3	0.00
Kashima Antlers	Japan	1	0	0	1	1	2	−1	0.00
Kashiwa Reysol	Japan	1	0	0	1	0	2	−2	0.00
Koloale	Solomon Islands	4	3	1	0	20	8	+12	75.00
Lae City (Note: Includes Lae City Dwellers & Toti City.)	Papua New Guinea	3	3	0	0	8	1	+7	100.00
Lautoka	Fiji	1	1	0	0	1	0	+1	100.00
Lupe o le Soaga	Samoa	2	2	0	0	5	0	+5	100.00
Madang	Papua New Guinea	1	1	0	0	5	0	+5	100.00
Malampa Revivors	Vanuatu	1	1	0	0	11	0	+11	100.00
Manumea	American Samoa	1	1	0	0	0	0	+0	100.00
Marist Fire	Solomon Islands	1	1	0	0	3	1	+2	100.00
Moghreb Tetouan	Morocco	1	0	1	0	0	0	+0	0.00
Mont-Dore	New Caledonia	4	4	0	0	20	2	+18	100.00
Nadi	Fiji	1	1	0	0	3	0	+3	100.00
Nikao Sokattack	Cook Islands	1	1	0	0	4	1	+3	100.00
Nokia Eagles	Fiji	1	1	0	0	9	1	+8	100.00
Port Vila Sharks	Vanuatu	2	2	0	0	10	1	+9	100.00
Pyramids	Egypt	1	0	0	1	0	3	−3	0.00
Raja Casablanca	Morocco	1	0	0	1	1	2	−1	0.00
Rewa	Fiji	4	2	2	0	9	4	+5	50.00
San Lorenzo	Argentina	1	0	0	1	1	2	−1	0.00
Sanfrecce Hiroshima	Japan	2	0	0	2	0	3	−3	0.00
Singapore U23	Singapore	1	1	0	0	4	0	+4	100.00
Sobou	Papua New Guinea	2	2	0	0	13	1	+12	100.00
Solomon Warriors	Solomon Islands	5	5	0	0	20	1	+19	100.00
Suva	Fiji	3	3	0	0	10	3	+7	100.00
Sydney FC	Australia	1	0	0	1	2	3	−1	0.00
Team Wellington	New Zealand	6	3	3	0	11	3	+8	50.00
Tiga Sport	New Caledonia	2	2	0	0	3	0	+3	100.00
TP Mazembe	DR Congo	1	1	0	0	3	2	+1	100.00
Tupapa Maraerenga	Cook Islands	1	1	0	0	15	0	+15	100.00
Vénus	Tahiti	4	4	0	0	15	3	+12	100.00
Waitakere United	New Zealand	13	4	7	2	20	16	+4	30.77
Wellington Olympic	New Zealand	4	2	2	0	10	7	+3	50.00
Western United	Solomon Islands	2	2	0	0	5	1	+4	100.00
Total (59 teams)	25 countries	146	97	24	25	373	143	+230	66.44
