= Maikeli Lomu =

Tongan footballer (born 1997)

Personal information
- Date of birth: 29 October 1997 (age 28)
- Place of birth: Spanish Fork, United States
- Position: Midfielder

Team information
- Current team: Nukuhetulu FC

Senior career*
| Years | Team | Apps | (Gls) |
| 2024–2024 | Veitongo FC | | |
| 2025- | Nukuhetulu FC | | |

International career
| 2024– | Tonga | | |
- * Club domestic league appearances and goals

Maikeli Lomu (born 29 October 1997) is a footballer who played as a defender for Nukuhetulu FC. Born in the United States, he is a Tonga international.

== Life and career ==
Lomu was born on 29 October 1997 in Spanish Fork, has a diverse heritage, with a Tongan father and an American mother. Growing up in his hometown of Spanish Fork, he attended Spanish Fork High School. Married with three daughters, he and his wife once co-owned a pottery studio together. Over the years, he has also resided in Texas.

Lomu primarily plays as a central midfielder, having developed his skills on his high school soccer team. Although he was offered a college soccer scholarship, the opportunity was withdrawn after he served a Mormon mission. In 2024, he signed with Tongan club Veitongo FC and has since represented Tonga internationally. His first call-up to the Tonga national football team came during the 2026 FIFA World Cup qualification, though the team was eliminated in the first round.

In 2025, Lomu joined Nukuhetulu FC and made his debut in the 2026 OFC Men's Champions League qualifying stage match against Tupapa Maraerenga F.C.
