= 2026 OFC Men's Champions League knockout stage =

The 2026 OFC Men's Champions League knockout stage was played from 19 to 22 August 2026. A total of four teams competed in the knockout stage to decide the champions of the 2026 OFC Men's Champions League.

All times are local, FJT (UTC+12).

== Qualified teams ==
The winners and runners-up of each of the two groups in the group stage advanced to the semi-finals.

Group	Winners	Runners-up
A	(New Zealand) Auckland City	(Solomon Islands) Central Coast
B	(Vanuatu) Galaxy	(Fiji) Rewa

== Format ==
The four teams in the knockout stage played on a single-elimination basis, with each tie played as a single match at the Govind Park.

== Schedule ==
The schedule of each round is as follows.

Round	Match dates
Semi-finals	19 August 2026
Final	22 August 2026 at Govind Park, Ba

== Bracket ==
Semi-finals
19 August – Ba
(New Zealand) Auckland City	3
(Fiji) Rewa	1
19 August – Ba
(Vanuatu) ABM Galaxy	2
(Solomon Islands) Central Coast (a.e.t.)	3

Final
22 August – Ba
(New Zealand) Auckland City	2
(Solomon Islands) Central Coast	0

== Semi-finals ==
Team 1	Score	Team 2
Auckland City (New Zealand)	3–1	(Fiji) Rewa
Galaxy (Vanuatu)	2–3 (a.e.t.)	(Solomon Islands) Central Coast

19 August 2026
15:00

Auckland City (New Zealand)	3−1	(Fiji) Rewa
Garriga 34'; Rostron 45'; Ellis 54'	Report	Sela 89'

Govind Park, Ba
Attendance: 300
Referee: David Yareboinen (Papua New Guinea)

19 August 2026
19:00

Galaxy (Vanuatu)	2−3 (a.e.t.)	(Solomon Islands) Central Coast
Medina 69', 77'	Report	Lea'i 15', 44', 117'

Govind Park, Ba
Attendance: 200
Referee: Campbell-Kirk Kawana-Waugh (New Zealand)

== Final ==
In the final, the two semi-final winners played against each other. The final was played on 22 August 2026.

22 August 2026
15:00 UTC+12

Auckland City (New Zealand)	2−0	(Solomon Islands) Central Coast
de Vries 69'; Ellis 81'	Report

Govind Park, Ba
Attendance: 250
Referee: Veer Singh (Fiji)

== Goalscorers ==
3 Goals

- Raphael Lea'i

2 Goals

- Medina
- Matt Ellis

1 Goals

- Gerard Garriga
- Nathan Rostron
- Ryan De Vries
