= 2026 OFC Men's Champions League group stage =

The 2026 OFC Men's Champions League group stage is played from 9 to 16 August 2026. A total of eight teams compete in the group stage to decide the four places in the knockout stage of the 2026 OFC Men's Champions League. The tournament is hosted by Fiji, with matches played at Churchill Park in Lautoka and Govind Park (4R Stadium) in Ba.

== Draw ==
The draw for the group stage was held at the OFC Home of Football – Te Kahu o Kiwa in Auckland on 23 February 2026. The eight teams were drawn into two groups of four.

Direct qualifiers	Qualifying stage winner
(Fiji) Rewa; (New Zealand) Auckland City; (Solomon Islands) Central Coast; (French Polynesia) Vénus; (New Caledonia) Tiga Sport; (Papua New Guinea) Lae City; (Vanuatu) Galaxy	(Cook Islands) Tupapa Maraerenga

== Format ==
The four teams in each group play each other on a round-robin basis at two centralised venues in Fiji. The winners and runners-up of each group advance to the semi-finals of the knockout stage.

The group stage is part of the 25th edition of the OFC Men's Champions League, which is held in Fiji from 9 to 22 August 2026. All matches are played at Churchill Park in Lautoka and Govind Park (4R Stadium) in Ba.

== Schedule ==
Matchday	Dates		Matches
Matchday	Group A	Group B	Matches
Matchday 1	10 August 2026	9 August 2026	Team 1 vs. Team 2, Team 3 vs. Team 4
Matchday 2	13 August 2026	12 August 2026	Team 1 vs. Team 3, Team 4 vs. Team 2
Matchday 3	16 August 2026	15 August 2026	Team 4 vs. Team 1, Team 2 vs. Team 3

== Groups ==
=== Group A ===
All times are local, FJT (UTC+12).

Pos	Team	Pld	W	D	L	GF	GA	GD	Pts	Qualification	AUC	CEN	TIG	VEN
1	(New Zealand) Auckland City	3	3	0	0	7	4	+3	9	Advance to knockout stage	—	—	—	4–3
2	(Solomon Islands) Central Coast	3	2	0	1	6	2	+4	6	Advance to knockout stage	1–2	—	—	3–0
3	(New Caledonia) Tiga Sport	3	1	0	2	1	3	−2	3		0–1	0–2	—	—
4	(French Polynesia) Vénus	3	0	0	3	3	8	−5	0		—	—	0–1	—

Source: OFC
10 August 2026
12:00

Vénus (French Polynesia)	0–1	(New Caledonia) Tiga Sport
	Report	Saiko 89'

Churchill Park, Lautoka
Attendance: 100
Referee: Neeshil Varman (Fiji)
10 August 2026
15:00

Central Coast (Solomon Islands)	1–2	(New Zealand) Auckland City
Leslie 58'	Report	Garriga 78'; De Vries 80'

Churchill Park, Lautoka
Attendance: 200
Referee: Veer Singh (Fiji)

13 August 2026
12:00

Tiga Sport (New Caledonia)	0–1	(New Zealand) Auckland City
	Report	Ilich 85'

Churchill Park, Lautoka
Attendance: 100
Referee: Ben Aukwai (Solomon Islands)
13 August 2026
15:00

Central Coast (Solomon Islands)	3–0	(French Polynesia) Vénus
Limoki 8'; Lea'i 19'; Leslie 24'	Report

Churchill Park, Lautoka
Referee: David Yareboinen (Papua New Guinea)

16 August 2026
12:00

Auckland City (New Zealand)	4–3	(French Polynesia) Vénus
Doudera 45'; Gray 54'; Watson 84'; Ellis 90'	Report	Kaiha 6'; Lacan 26'; Haewegene 77'

Govind Park, Ba
Attendance: 100
Referee: Veer Singh (Fiji)
16 August 2026
15:00

Tiga Sport (New Caledonia)	0–2	(Solomon Islands) Central Coast
	Report	Wae 15'; Tahioa 72'

Govind Park, Ba
Attendance: 100
Referee: David Yareboinen (Papua New Guinea)

=== Group B ===
All times are local, FJT (UTC+12).

Pos	Team	Pld	W	D	L	GF	GA	GD	Pts	Qualification	GAL	REW	LAE	TUP
1	(Vanuatu) Galaxy	3	3	0	0	14	3	+11	9	Advance to knockout stage	—	4–1	—	—
2	(Fiji) Rewa (H)	3	2	0	1	7	7	0	6	Advance to knockout stage	—	—	2–1	4–2
3	(Papua New Guinea) Lae City	3	1	0	2	6	6	0	3		1–3	—	—	4–1
4	(Cook Islands) Tupapa Maraerenga	3	0	0	3	4	15	−11	0		1–7	—	—	—

Source: OFC
(H) Hosts
9 August 2026
12:00

Lae City (Papua New Guinea)	4–1	(Cook Islands) Tupapa Maraerenga
Kamake 17'; Tuteru 43' (o.g.); Moses 52'; Api 90+2'	Report	Rimene-Albrett 72'

Churchill Park, Lautoka
Attendance: 100
Referee: Ben Aukwai (Solomon Islands)
9 August 2026
15:00

Galaxy (Vanuatu)	4–1	(Fiji) Rewa
Malakai 4'; Medina 45', 52', 86' (pen.)	Report	Matanisiga 58'

Churchill Park, Lautoka
Attendance: 1,100
Referee: Ben O'Connell (New Zealand)

12 August 2026
16:00

Rewa (Fiji)	4–2	(Cook Islands) Tupapa Maraerenga
Khan 40'; Athale 48'; Hughes 67'; Sela 85'	Report	Rimene-Albrett 47'; Maraetefau 90+4'

Govind Park, Ba
Attendance: 752
Referee: Timothy Niu (Solomon Islands)
12 August 2026
19:00

Lae City (Papua New Guinea)	1–3	(Vanuatu) Galaxy
Hayes 13'	Report	Medina 40', 69', 70'

Govind Park, Ba
Attendance: 150
Referee: Anna-Marie Keighley (New Zealand)

15 August 2026
12:00

Tupapa Maraerenga (Cook Islands)	1–7	(Vanuatu) Galaxy
Rimene-Albrett 88'	Report	Viliamu 25' (o.g.); Moses 41'; Medina 47', 55', 70'; Roberson 49'; Soksok 90+1'

Govind Park, Ba
Attendance: 100
Referee: Neeshil Varman (Fiji)
15 August 2026
15:00

Rewa (Fiji)	2–1	(Papua New Guinea) Lae City
Rawaqa 45'; Nand 52'	Report	Rudolf 15'

Govind Park, Ba
Attendance: 300
Referee: Ben Aukwai (Solomon Islands)
