= 2026 OFC Men's Champions League =

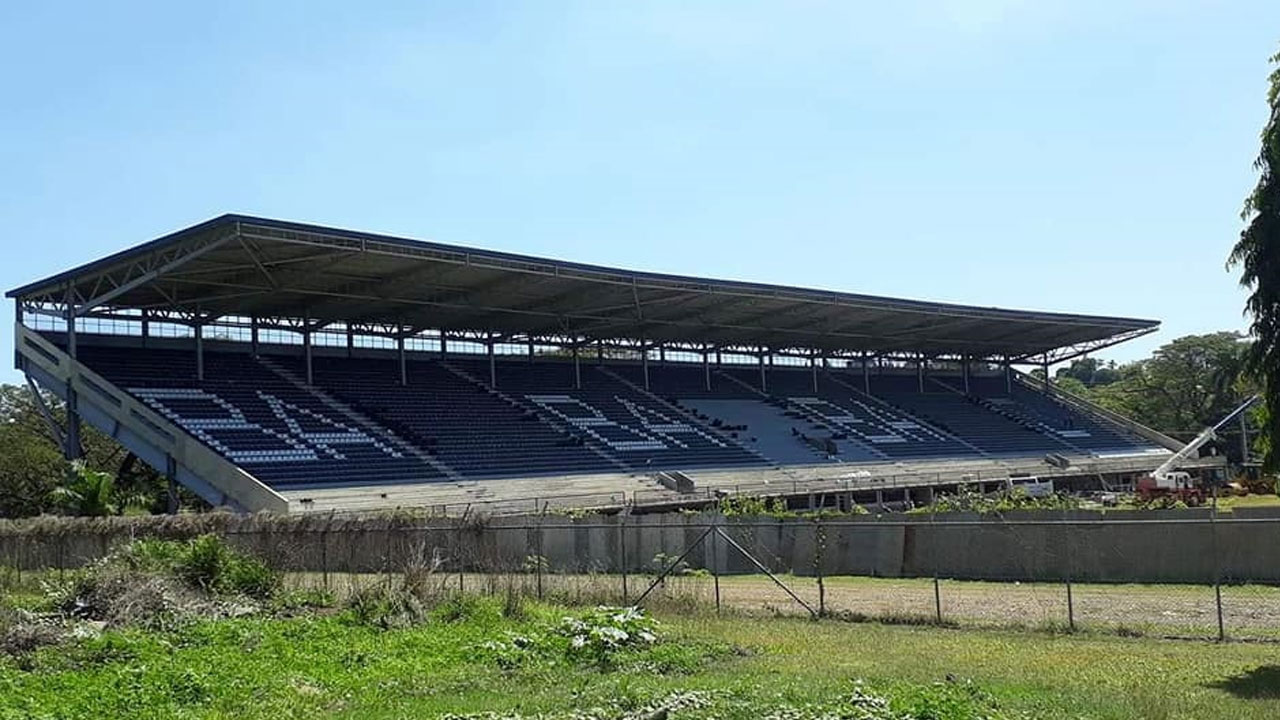
- Govind Park in Ba hosted the final

Tournament details
- Host countries: Qualifying: Samoa; Competition proper: Fiji
- Dates: Qualifying: 31 January – 6 February; Competition proper: 9–22 August
- Teams: Competition proper: 8 Total: 11 (from 11 associations)

Final positions
- Champions: (New Zealand) Auckland City (14th title)
- Runners-up: (Solomon Islands) Central Coast

Tournament statistics
- Matches played: 15
- Goals scored: 59 (3.93 per match)
- Attendance: 3,852 (257 per match)
- Top scorer(s): Medina (Galaxy); 11 goals)
- Best player: Medina (Galaxy)
- Best goalkeeper: Matt Foord (Auckland City)
- Fair play award: Tupapa Maraerenga

The 2026 OFC Men's Champions League was the 24th edition of the Oceania's club football tournament, organized by the Oceania Football Confederation (OFC). This was the third season under the current OFC Men's Champions League name, and the first in which the champions do not qualify for the FIFA Club World Cup or the FIFA Intercontinental Cup, with the OFC Professional League champions taking their place instead.

== Teams ==
Location of teams of the 2026 OFC Champions League.
Teams entering the Group Stage; (H) Final tournament host
Teams entering the qualifying stage; (h) Qualifying stage host

A total of 11 teams from all 11 OFC member associations may enter the competition.

- Seven associations (Fiji, New Caledonia, New Zealand, Papua New Guinea, Solomon Islands, Tahiti, Vanuatu) are awarded one berth each in the group stage.
- Four associations (American Samoa, Cook Islands, Samoa, Tonga) are awarded one berth each in the qualifying stage, with the winners advancing to the group stage.

Qualified teams for 2026 OFC Men's Champions League
Entry round		Teams			
Group stage		(Fiji) Rewa (1st)	(New Caledonia) Tiga Sport (1st)	(New Zealand) Auckland City (1st)	(Papua New Guinea) Lae City (1st RS)
Group stage		(Solomon Islands) Central Coast (1st)	(French Polynesia) Vénus (1st)	(Vanuatu) Galaxy (1st)	
Qualifying stage	PR	(American Samoa) Pago Youth (2nd)	(Cook Islands) Tupapa Maraerenga (CW)	(Samoa) Vaivase-Tai (3rd)	(Tonga) Nukuhetulu (1st)

== Schedule ==
Schedule for 2026 OFC Men's Champions League
Phase	Round	Draw date	Match
Qualifying stage	Preliminary group	17 December 2025	31 January
Qualifying stage	Preliminary group	17 December 2025	3 February
Qualifying stage	Preliminary group	17 December 2025	6 February
Group stage	Matchday 1	24 February 2026	9–10 August
Group stage	Matchday 2	24 February 2026	12–13 August
Group stage	Matchday 3	24 February 2026	15–16 August
Knockout phase	Semi-finals	24 February 2026	19 August
Knockout phase	Final	24 February 2026	22 August

== Qualifying stage ==
=== Preliminary group ===
The four teams in the qualifying stage played each other on a round-robin basis at a centralised venue in Samoa. The winners advanced to the group stage.

=== Matches ===
Pos	Team	Pld	W	D	L	GF	GA	GD	Pts	Qualification	TUP	VPN	PGY	NKT
1	(Cook Islands) Tupapa Maraerenga	3	2	1	0	7	1	+6	7	Advance to group stage	—	1–1	—	3–0
2	(Samoa) Vaivase-Tai (H)	3	1	2	0	7	5	+2	5		—	—	1–1	—
3	(American Samoa) Pago Youth	3	0	2	1	3	6	−3	2		0–3	—	—	2–2
4	(Tonga) Nukuhetulu	3	0	1	2	5	10	−5	1		—	3–5	—	—

Source: OFC
(H) Hosts

== Final tournament ==
=== Qualified teams ===
Teams entering the Group stage	Teams qualified from the qualifying round
(Fiji) Rewa; (New Caledonia) Tiga Sport; (New Zealand) Auckland City; (Papua New Guinea) Lae City; (Solomon Islands) Central Coast; (French Polynesia) Vénus; (Vanuatu) Galaxy	(Cook Islands) Tupapa Maraerenga (Note: The identity of the qualifying winners was not known at the time of the final draw)

=== Draw result ===
Group A
Pos	Team
A1	(Solomon Islands) Central Coast
A2	(New Zealand) Auckland City
A3	(French Polynesia) Vénus
A4	(New Caledonia) Tiga Sport

Group B
Pos	Team
B1	(Papua New Guinea) Lae City
B2	(Cook Islands) Tupapa Maraerenga
B3	(Vanuatu) Galaxy
B4	(Fiji) Rewa

=== Venues ===
Fiji
Lautoka	Ba
Churchill Park	Govind Park
Capacity: 18,000	Capacity: 13,500
	Govind-Park-Fiji
2026 OFC Men's Champions League is located in Fiji

== Group stage ==
=== Group A ===
Pos	Team	Pld	W	D	L	GF	GA	GD	Pts	Qualification	AUC	CEN	TIG	VEN
1	(New Zealand) Auckland City	3	3	0	0	7	4	+3	9	Advance to knockout stage	—	—	—	4–3
2	(Solomon Islands) Central Coast	3	2	0	1	6	2	+4	6	Advance to knockout stage	1–2	—	—	3–0
3	(New Caledonia) Tiga Sport	3	1	0	2	1	3	−2	3		0–1	0–2	—	—
4	(French Polynesia) Vénus	3	0	0	3	3	8	−5	0		—	—	0–1	—

Source: OFC

=== Group B ===
Pos	Team	Pld	W	D	L	GF	GA	GD	Pts	Qualification	GAL	REW	LAE	TUP
1	(Vanuatu) Galaxy	3	3	0	0	14	3	+11	9	Advance to knockout stage	—	4–1	—	—
2	(Fiji) Rewa (H)	3	2	0	1	7	7	0	6	Advance to knockout stage	—	—	2–1	4–2
3	(Papua New Guinea) Lae City	3	1	0	2	6	6	0	3		1–3	—	—	4–1
4	(Cook Islands) Tupapa Maraerenga	3	0	0	3	4	15	−11	0		1–7	—	—	—

Source: OFC
(H) Hosts

== Knockout stage ==
The four teams in the knockout stage played on a single-elimination basis, with each tie played as a single match at the Govind Park.

=== Bracket ===
Semi-finals
19 August – Ba
(New Zealand) Auckland City	3
(Fiji) Rewa	1
19 August – Ba
(Vanuatu) ABM Galaxy	2
(Solomon Islands) Central Coast (a.e.t.)	3

Final
22 August – Ba
(New Zealand) Auckland City	2
(Solomon Islands) Central Coast	0

=== Semi-finals ===
Team 1	Score	Team 2
Auckland City (New Zealand)	3–1	(Fiji) Rewa
Galaxy (Vanuatu)	2–3 (a.e.t.)	(Solomon Islands) Central Coast

=== Grand Final ===
In the final, the two semi-final winners played against each other. The final was played on 22 August 2026.

22 August 2026
15:00 UTC+12

Auckland City (New Zealand)	2−0	(Solomon Islands) Central Coast
de Vries 69'; Ellis 81'	Report

Govind Park, Ba
Attendance: 250
Referee: Veer Singh (Fiji)

== Top goalscorers ==
Team eliminated / inactive for this round

Rank	Player	Team	QS1	QS2	QS3	GS1	GS2	GS3	SF	F	Total
1	(Brazil) Medina	(Vanuatu) Galaxy				3	3	3	2		11
2	(Solomon Islands) Raphael Lea'i	(Solomon Islands) Central Coast					1		3		4
2	(England) Daniel Bunch	(Cook Islands) Tupapa Maraerenga	2		2						4
4	(New Zealand) Matt Ellis	(New Zealand) Auckland City						1	1	1	3
4	(Cook Islands) Tremaine Rimene-Albrett	(Cook Islands) Tupapa Maraerenga				1	1	1			3
6	(New Zealand) Ryan de Vries	(New Zealand) Auckland City				1				1	2
6	(Spain) Gerard Garriga	(New Zealand) Auckland City				1			1		2
6	(Solomon Islands) Bobby Leslie	(Solomon Islands) Central Coast				1	1				2
6	(Fiji) Josaia Sela	(Fiji) Rewa					1		1		2
6	(American Samoa) Johnica Collins	(American Samoa) Pago Youth	1	1							2
6	(Samoa) Ronald Scanlan	(Samoa) Vaivase-Tai	1		1						2
6	(Samoa) Nathan Viliamu	(Samoa) Vaivase-Tai			2						2

== Awards ==
Award	Winner	Team
Golden Ball	(Brazil) Medina	(Vanuatu) Galaxy
Golden Boot	(Brazil) Medina	(Vanuatu) Galaxy
Golden Glove	(New Zealand) Matt Foord	(New Zealand) Auckland City
Fair Play Award	—N/a	(Cook Islands) Tupapa Maraerenga

== See also ==
- 2026 OFC Professional League
