= Jacob Moli =

Solomon Islands footballer and manager

Personal information
- Date of birth: 11 May 1967 (age 59)
- Place of birth: Solomon Islands

International career
Years	Team	Apps	(Gls)
- Solomon Islands

Managerial career
- 2011–2014: Solomon Islands
- 2014–2016: Solomon Islands U17
- 2020–: Central Coast F.C.
- 2024: Solomon Islands (caretaker)
Medal record
Men's football
Representing Solomon Islands (as manager)
Pacific Games
Silver medal – second place	2011 New Caledonia

Jacob Moli (born 11 May 1967) is a Solomon Islands former footballer and the current manager of Central Coast F.C. and was the caretaker manager of the Solomon Islands national football team. He was also the manager of the Solomon Islands national football team from 2011 to 2014.

== Honours ==
=== Manager ===
Solomon Islands

- Pacific Games: Silver Medalist, 2011
