= 2026 OFC Men's Champions League qualifying stage =

The 2026 OFC Men's Champions League qualifying stage was played from 31 January to 6 February 2026. A total of four teams competed in the qualifying stage to decide the last of the 8 places in the group stage of the 2026 OFC Men's Champions League.

== Preliminary group ==
=== Draw ===
The draw was held on 17 December 2025 at OFC Headquarters in Auckland.

Host team	Remaining teams
(Samoa) Vaivase-Tai	(American Samoa) Pago Youth; (Tonga) Nukuhetulu; (Cook Islands) Tupapa Maraerenga

=== Format ===
The four teams in the qualifying stage played each other on a round-robin basis at the FFS Football Stadium.

Pos	Team	Pld	W	D	L	GF	GA	GD	Pts	Qualification	TUP	VPN	PGY	NKT
1	(Cook Islands) Tupapa Maraerenga	3	2	1	0	7	1	+6	7	Advance to group stage	—	1–1	—	3–0
2	(Samoa) Vaivase-Tai (H)	3	1	2	0	7	5	+2	5		—	—	1–1	—
3	(American Samoa) Pago Youth	3	0	2	1	3	6	−3	2		0–3	—	—	2–2
4	(Tonga) Nukuhetulu	3	0	1	2	5	10	−5	1		—	3–5	—	—

Source: OFC
(H) Hosts
31 January 2026
12:00

Vaivase-Tai (Samoa)	1–1	(American Samoa) Pago Youth
Scanlan 47'	(Report) (OFC)	Collins 54'

FFS Football Stadium (Field 1), Apia
Attendance: 200
Referee: Kyllian Lelarge (New Caledonia)
31 January 2026
16:00

Tupapa Maraerenga (Cook Islands)	3–0	(Tonga) Nukuhetulu
Bunch 10', 24'; Tuakana 29'	(Report) (OFC)

FFS Football Stadium (Field 1), Apia
Attendance: 75
Referee: Jarethy George (Vanuatu)

3 February 2026
12:00

Pago Youth (American Samoa)	2–2	(Tonga) Nukuhetulu
Ledoux 71'; Collins 85' (pen.)	(Report) (OFC)	Manu'olevao 73'; Aho 90' (pen.)

FFS Football Stadium (Field 1), Apia
Attendance: 100
Referee: Pari Oito (Tahiti)
3 February 2026
16:00

Tupapa Maraerenga (Cook Islands)	1–1	(Samoa) Vaivase-Tai
Webb 25'	(Report) (OFC)	Fa'amatau 58'

FFS Football Stadium (Field 1), Apia
Attendance: 200
Referee: Gideon Mamuala (Solomon Islands)

6 February 2026
12:00

Nukuhetulu (Tonga)	3–5	(Samoa) Vaivase-Tai
Burton Gee 47'; Lyman 59'; Kite 82'	(Report) (OFC)	V. Viliamu 17' (pen.); Scanlan 24'; N. Viliamu 42', 50'; Stowers 61'

FFS Football Stadium (Field 1), Apia
Attendance: 100
Referee: Gideon Mamuala (Solomon Islands)
6 February 2026
16:00

Pago Youth (American Samoa)	0–3	(Cook Islands) Tupapa Maraerenga
	(Report) (OFC)	Bunch 25', 45' (pen.); Harmon 90+1'

FFS Football Stadium (Field 1), Apia
Attendance: 100
Referee: Kyllian Lelarge (New Caledonia)
