= Nukuhetulu FC =

Tongan sports club

Nukuhetulu
- Founded: 2017; 9 years ago
- Ground: Teufaiva Sport Stadium (selected matches)
- Capacity: 10,000
- Manager: Lafaele Moala
- League: Tonga Major League
- 2025: Champions
Home colours	Away colours	Third colours

Nukuhetulu FC is a Tongan professional association football club currently playing in the Tonga Major League. The club also fields youth sides and a women's team.

== History ==
Nukuhetulu FC first competed in senior men's football in 2020. In 2025, the club won the double with Tonga Major League and Tonga Cup championships that season. The club defeated reigning cup champions Veitongo FC 1–0 to advance to the final against Lavengatonga FC. Veitongo won the 2020 edition of the tournament, which was revived again after a five-year hiatus. The Nukuhetulu squad was coached by Lafaele Moala and included a number of youth national team and national futsal players. The club was level 1–1 with Lavengatonga at the end of regulation but won the penalty shoot-out 4–2 for its first-ever cup championship. By virtue of its victory, Nukuhetulu qualified for the 2026 OFC Men's Champions League, joining Veitongo and Lotohaʻapai United as the only three Tongan clubs to participate in the competition. At the Tonga Football Association awards ceremony, Nukuhetulu player Unaloto ‘Aho was named Player of the Tournament for his cup performances. Nukuhetulu FC became the third-ever Tongan club to enter the OFC Champions League when it entered the 2026 edition of the tournament.

== Continental record ==
OFC Men's Champions League results
Season	Round	Club		Home	Away	Aggregate
2026	PR	(Cook Islands)	Tupapa Maraerenga	0–3		4th
2026	PR	(American Samoa)	Pago Youth	2–2		4th
2026	PR	(Samoa)	Vaivase-Tai	3–5		4th

== Honours ==
Tonga Major League

Champions (1): 2025

Tonga Cup

Champions (1): 2025

== Women's team ==
The Nukuhetulu women's team won the 2024/2025 Heilala Manongi Cup to qualify for the 2026 OFC Women's Champions League. With the men's team already qualified for the OFC Men's Champions League that season, the club would represent Tonga in both competitions in 2026.
