= Medina (footballer) =

Brazilian footballer

Personal information
- Full name: Willian dos Santos Medina
- Date of birth: 9 September 1992 (age 34)
- Place of birth: Itanhandu, Brazil
- Height: 1.69 m (5 ft 7 in)
- Position: Right winger

Youth career
- –2011: União São João

Senior career*
Years	Team	Apps	(Gls)
2011–2012	União São João	3	(1)
2013	ECUS	15	(4)
2014–2016	Manthiqueira	19	(10)
2015	→ Barretos (loan)	11	(2)
2016	Matonense	23	(11)
2016–2017	Rio Claro	26	(10)
2017	Goiás	4	(0)
2018	Inter de Limeira	22	(2)
2019	Juventus-SP	14	(2)
2020–2021	Marcílio Dias	36	(3)
2021	São José-SP	2	(0)
2021	Comercial-SP	6	(0)
2022	Barretos	15	(3)
2023	Manauara	8	(2)
2023	Nação	14	(4)
2024	Jequié	10	(1)
2024	Santa Catarina	11	(1)
2025	Rio Preto	12	(2)
2025	Passo Fundo	14	(2)
2026–	ABM Galaxy	0	(0)
- * Club domestic league appearances and goals as of 15 August 2026

Willian dos Santos Medina (born 9 September 1992), simply known as Medina, is a Brazilian professional footballer who plays as a right winger for Vanuatu club ABM Galaxy.

== Career ==
A forward with a short stature and great speed, Medina stood out in football in the countryside of São Paulo, especially for Rio Claro where he was top scorer in the Copa Paulista in 2016. In 2017 he played for Goiás in the state championship, becoming champion and then having notable spells with Marcílio Dias, São José, Comercial, Manauara and Nação Esportes, where he was champion of the state Série B in 2023.

In the 2024 season, Medina played for AD Jequié during the Campeonato Baiano and for Santa Catarina de Rio do Sul. On the 2025 season, Medina played for the Rio Preto and Passo Fundo teams.

In the 2026 OFC Men's Champions League, Medina scored nine goals in the group stage of the competition with three consecutive hat-tricks playing for Vanuatu club ABM Galaxy. A few days later, he scored two more goals in the semi-finals. Despite being eliminated from the competition, he finished as the top scorer with 11 goals.

== Honours ==
Goiás

- Campeonato Goiano: 2017

Nação

- Campeonato Catarinense Série B: 2023

Individual

- 2016 Copa Paulista top scorer: 10 goals
- 2023 Campeonato Catarinense Série B top scorer: 4 goals
