= Govind Park =

Sports stadium in Ba, Fiji

Govind Park Four R Stadium Govind Park
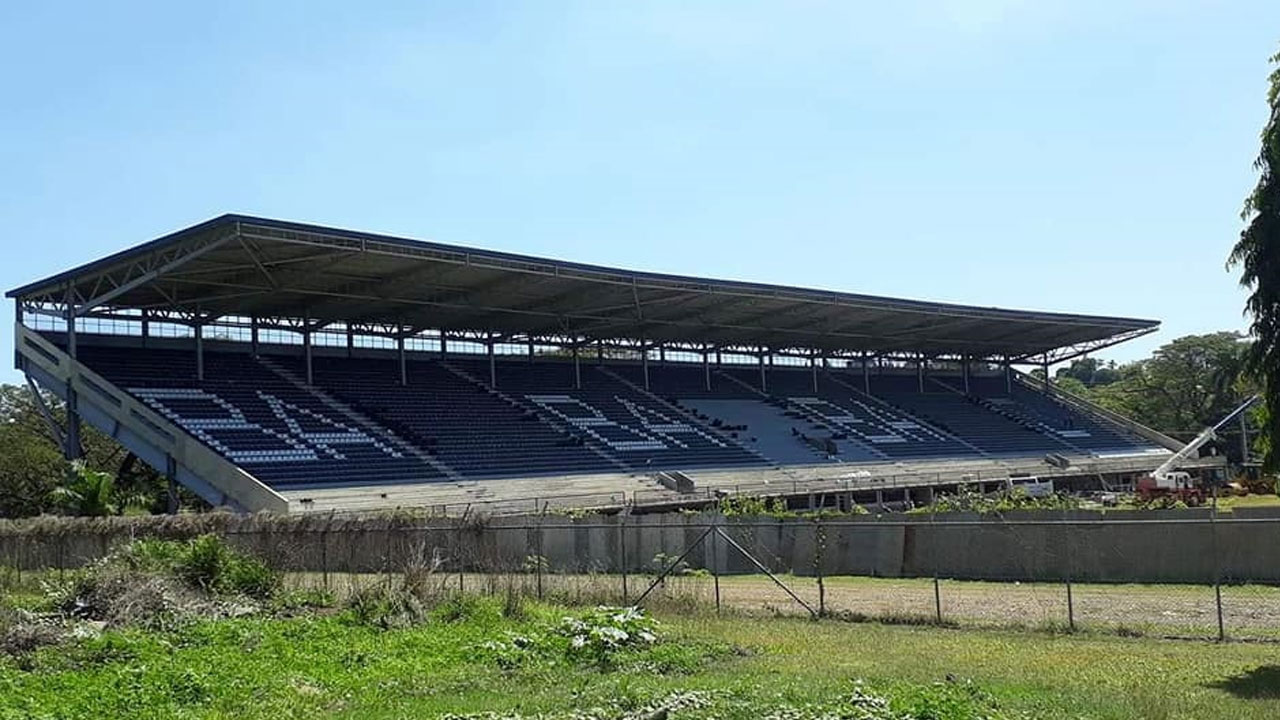
- Govind Park during its revamp in 2023.
- Interactive map of Govind Park; Four R Stadium Govind Park
- Location: Ba, Ba Province, Fiji
- Coordinates: 17°32′17″S 177°41′28″E
- Owner: Ba Town Council
- Operator: Ba Town Council
- Capacity: 13,500
- Type: Multi-purpose stadium
- Surface: Grass
- Field shape: Rectangular

Construction
- Opened: 17 July 1976; 50 years ago
- Renovated: 2016–2024
- Years active: 1976–2016; 2025–present
- Cost: FJ$13 million (redevelopment)

Tenants
- Super Rugby Pacific; Fijian Drua (2026–present); Fiji Premier League; Ba; OFCPL (occasional matches); Bula FC (2026–present)

Website
- batowncouncil.com.fj

Govind Park, known as the Four R Stadium Govind Park for sponsorship reasons, is a multi-use rectangular stadium in Ba, Fiji.

== History ==
The stadium was officially opened on 17 July 1976 by the ex-president of Fiji Football Association, Manikam V. Pillay. It is named after one of the former mayors of Ba town, Kishore Govind.

In June 2011 it hosted the 2011 Kshatriya World Cup, in which Nadi Khatri won by beating Men In Black Ba 2-0 in the final.

== Tournaments held ==
Govind Park has hosted football tournaments such as the Fiji Fact, Battle of the Giants and Inter District Championship.
