= Ba (town) =

Town in Fiji

Ba बा (Hindi)
- Town
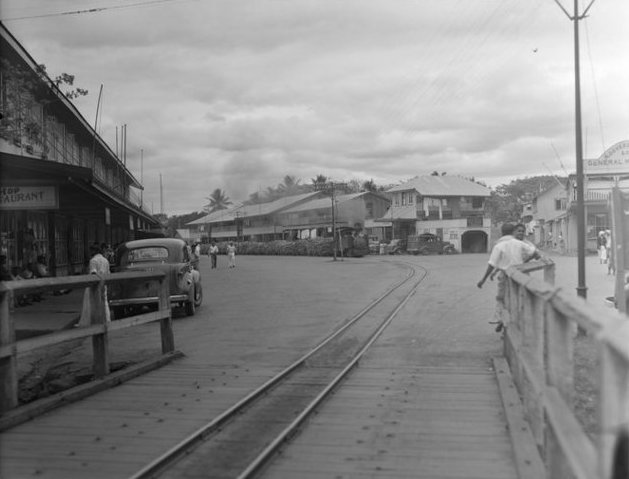
- Sugar cane train on the railway track on the road in Ba, 24 September 1949

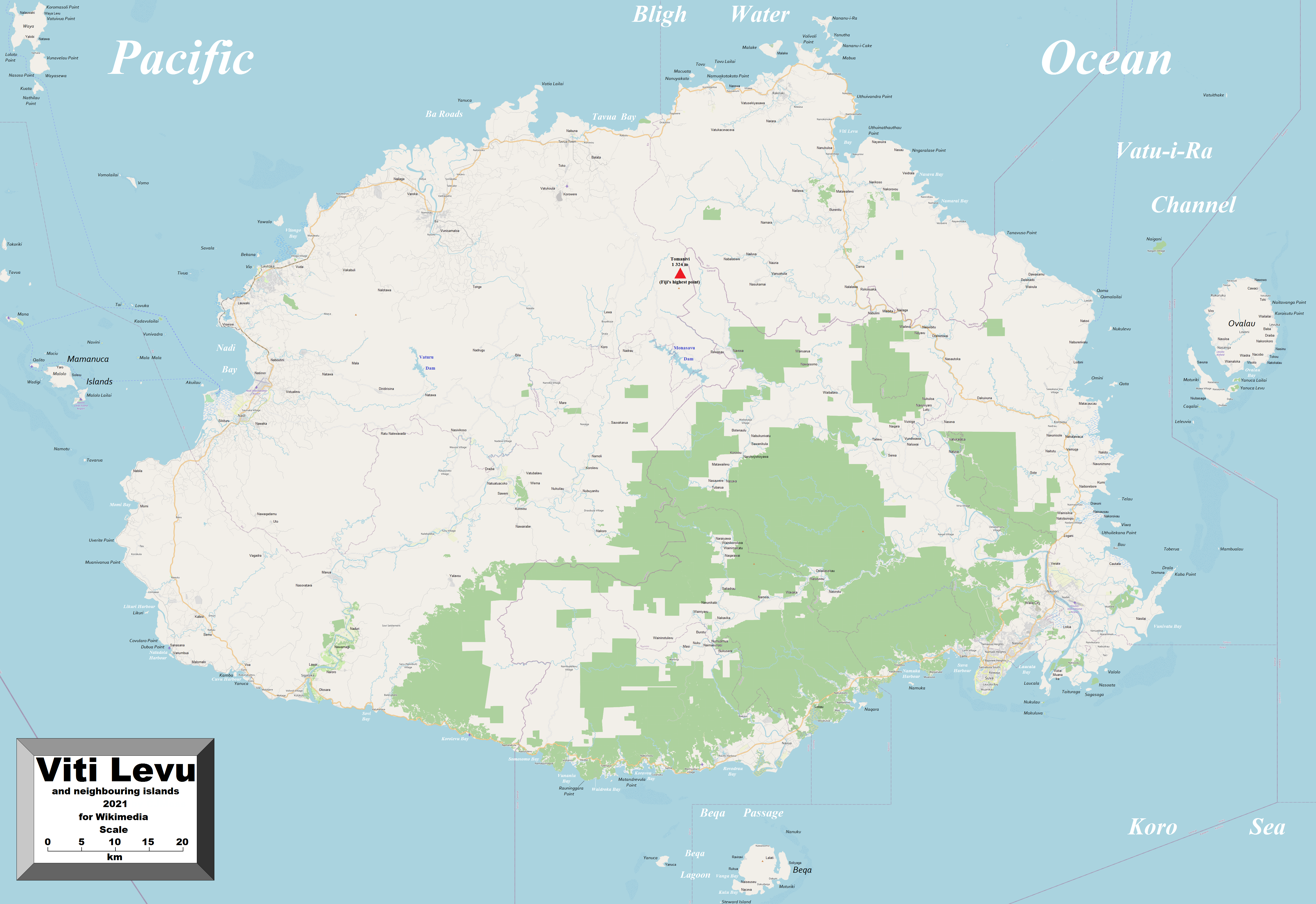
- Viti Levu with Ba in the north of the island

- Location in Fiji
- Country: Fiji
- Island: Viti Levu
- Division: Central Division
- Province: Ba
- Town: 1939

Population (2017)
  - Total: 13,825
- Time zone: UTC+12

Ba (Fijian pronunciation: [mba]) is a town in Fiji, 37 kilometres from Lautoka and 62 kilometres from Nadi, inland from the coast of Viti Levu, Fiji's largest island. Covering an area of 327 square kilometres, it had a population of 14,596 at the 1996 census. The town is built on the banks of the Ba River, after which it is named. For a long time, Ba was famous for its soccer team which caused major traffic problems. The old bridge was washed away in the floods of 1990s and a new bridge built downstream. This resulted in the main highway (King's Road) bypassing Ba. Jiaxing City in China is Ba’s sister city.

== Economy ==
Ba is an agricultural centre, with a population consisting mainly of Indo-Fijians, which makes it a cultural attraction for tourists. Sugar cane has long been the mainstay of the local economy, but some manufacturing projects have been established over the past fifteen years. Ba is part of the larger Ba Province, geographically the largest amongst Fiji's fourteen Provinces.

The town is also home to some of Fiji's wealthiest families who own some of the country's most successful business houses.

== History ==
Ba was incorporated as a Town in 1939, and is governed by a 15-member Town Council, whose members elect a mayor from among themselves. In 1987, Ahmed Bhamji was elected mayor at the age of 37, which at the time made him the youngest mayor in the country. At the last municipal election held in 2005, 14 of the 15 seats were won by the National Federation Party, with the remaining seat going to an independent candidate. The mayor was Parveen Bala until the year 2010. Since then, the office of Mayor has been vacant, and Ba, along with other towns, has been under the control of an Administrator instead.

Prominent landmarks include the Rarawai Mill built 1886 (on the outskirts of the town) and a large mosque near the river in the heart of the town. There is also a giant soccer ball in the heart of the town, which symbolizes that Ba is one of the best soccer teams in Fiji. Ba is also known as "Soccer Crazy Town" for its many wins in the national tournaments like IDC and BOG.

Ba was also declared to have fallen in the red zone of Cyclone Winston which made landfall on 20 February 2016 and claimed 49 lives across Fiji.
