= Central Coast F.C. =

Central Coast
- Full name: Central Coast Football Club
- Founded: 2020
- Ground: Lawson Tama Stadium; Honiara, Solomon Islands
- Capacity: 20,000
- League: Telekom S-League
- 2025: Champions
Home colours	Away colours

Central Coast FC is a Solomon Islands football club of Honiara, which plays in the Telekom S-League since 2020. Until 2019 they played in the Honiara Football League under the name CY Strikers. Besides football, the club also has a futsal section. They were founded by the natives of Malaita.

Central Coast won their first Telekom S-League title in the 2021 season; they proceeded to win their second and third in 2024 and 2025.
