= 2027 Auckland FC (OFC Professional League) season =

Auckland FC
2027 season
- Owner: Black Knight Football and Entertainment
- Chairman: Bill Foley
- Head Coach: Luke Casserly
- OFC Professional League: TBD
- Average home league attendance: 0
Home colours
- All statistics correct as of 15 November 2026.

The 2027 Auckland Football Club (OFC Professional League) season is the club's second season in the OFC Professional League. The season covers from January to June 2027.

== Management team ==
Position	Staff
Head coach	(Australia) Luke Casserly
Assistant coach	(Argentina) Emiliano Tade
Goalkeeper Coach	Vacant
Team manager	(New Zealand) Mitchell Callaghan
Physiotherapist	(New Zealand) Bede Christey

== Squad information ==
Players and squad numbers last updated on 15 November 2026. Appearances include all competitions.

Note: Flags indicate national team as has been defined under FIFA eligibility rules. Players may hold more than one non-FIFA nationality.

=== First team ===
No.	Player	Nat.	Positions	Date of birth (age)	Place of birth	Signed in	Signed from
Goalkeepers
40	Blake Callinan	(New Zealand)	GK	28 January 2006 (aged 19)	(New Zealand) Auckland	2025	Academy
50	Eli Jones	(New Zealand)	GK	4 February 2007 (aged 18)	(New Zealand) Palmerston North	2025	Academy
Defenders
Midfielders
Forwards
37	Ralph Rutherford	(New Zealand) (England)	FW	2 April 2005 (aged 20)	(New Zealand) Auckland	2025	Academy
41	Aston Burns	(New Zealand)	FW	2 August 2006 (aged 19)	(New Zealand) Auckland	2026	Academy

Notes:

- Player (V) – Player who is considered as a Visa player from outside of the Oceania Football Confederation.
- Player (OFC) – Player who is considered as a Oceania Visa player.

=== Other players with first-team appearances ===
Includes players to have been featured in a matchday squad for Auckland FC.

== Transfers ==
Note: Transfers' in/out date may refer to the date of announcement and not the date of signing from the mentioned players.

=== Transfers out ===
No.	Position	Name	Transferred to	Type/fee	Date	Ref.
20	FW	(Argentina) Emiliano Tade	Retired		4 June 2026	
21	FW	(New Zealand) Matt Ellis	(New Zealand) Auckland City	End of contract	29 June 2026	
13	DF	(New Zealand) Nathan Lobo	(New Zealand) Auckland City	End of contract	29 June 2026	
5	DF	(New Zealand) Michael Den Heijer	(New Zealand) Auckland City	End of contract	29 June 2026	
29	FW	(New Zealand) Kian Donkers	(New Zealand) Birkenhead United	End of contract	30 June 2026	
14	FW	(New Zealand) Liam Gillion	(Australia) Western Sydney Wanderers	End of contract	30 June 2026	
11	FW	(New Zealand) Oscar Faulds	Unattached	End of contract	30 June 2026	
27	MF	(New Zealand) Reid Drake	(New Zealand) Western Springs	End of contract	30 June 2026	
8	MF	(Australia) James Bayliss	(Australia) Marconi Stallions	End of contract	30 June 2026	
2	MF	(New Zealand) Aidan Carey	Unattached	End of contract	30 June 2026	
24	DF	(New Zealand) Zac Zoricich	(Australia) Sydney Olympic	End of contract	30 June 2026	
7	DF	(United States) Jonathan Robinson	Unattached	End of contract	30 June 2026	
3	DF	(Australia) Tass Mourdoukoutas	(Australia) Heidelberg United	End of contract	30 June 2026	
32	DF	(New Zealand) Everton O'Leary	(New Zealand) Birkenhead United	End of contract	30 June 2026	
1	GK	(New Zealand) Oscar Mason	(New Zealand) Western Springs	End of contract	30 June 2026	
6	MF	(Norway) Daniel Normann	Auckland FC (Senior Team)	Promoted	15 July 2026	
23	DF	(New Zealand) Ronan Wynne	Auckland FC (Senior Team)	Promoted	15 July 2026	
28	FW	(Australia) Bailey Ferguson	Auckland FC (Senior Team)	Promoted	19 July 2026	
12	MF	(New Zealand) Isa Prins	Auckland FC (Senior Team)	Promoted	19 July 2026	

== Competitions ==
=== Overall record ===
Competition	First match	Last match	Starting round	Record							
Competition	First match	Last match	Starting round	Pld	W	D	L	GF	GA	GD	Win %
OFC Pro League	22 January 2026	8 May 2026	Matchday 1	0	0	0	0	0	0	+0	—
Total				0	0	0	0	0	0	+0	—

Last updated: 10 October 2026
Source: Competitions

=== OFC Professional League ===
==== Circuit Series ====
===== Circuit Series table =====
2027 OFC Professional League circuit series

===== Results summary =====
Overall								Home						Away					
Pld	W	D	L	GF	GA	GD	Pts	W	D	L	GF	GA	GD	W	D	L	GF	GA	GD
0	0	0	0	0	0	0	0	0	0	0	0	0	0	0	0	0	0	0	0

Last updated: 21 April 2026.
Source: OFC Pro League

===== Results by round =====
Round	1	2	3	4	5	6	7	8	9	10	11	12	13	14
Ground	A	H	A	H	H	A	A	A	H	H	H	A	H	A
Result														
Position														
Points														

Source: OFC Pro League
A = Away; H = Home; N = Neutral; B = Bye; W = Win; D = Draw; L = Loss; X = Bye

===== Matches =====
The fixtures were announced on 6 October 2025.

Win Draw Loss Fixtures

Circuit 1 - Australia

22 January 2027 1	South Melbourne	v	Auckland FC	Australia

25 January 2027 2	Auckland FC	v	Vanuatu United	Australia

28 January 2027 3	PNG Hekari	v	Auckland FC	Australia

Circuit 2 - Australia

13 February 2027 4	Auckland FC	v	Tahiti United	Australia

16 February 2027 5	Auckland FC	v	Solomon Kings	Australia

21 February 2027 6	PNG Hekari	v	Auckland FC	Australia

Circuit 3 - New Zealand

7 March 2027 7	South Island United	v	Auckland FC	Christchurch, New Zealand

13 March 2027 8	Auckland FC	v	South Melbourne	Christchurch, New Zealand

13 March 2027 9	Bula FC	v	Auckland FC	Christchurch, New Zealand

Circuit 4 - New Zealand

7 April 2027 10	Auckland FC	v	PNG Hekari	Auckland, New Zealand

10 April 2027 11	Auckland FC	v	Bula FC	Auckland, New Zealand

Circuit 5 - Vanuatu

2 May 2027 12	Vanuatu United	v	Auckland FC	Vanuatu

5 May 2027 13	Auckland FC	v	South Island United	Vanuatu

8 May 2027 14	Tahiti United	v	Auckland FC	Vanuatu

== Statistics ==
=== Appearances and goals ===
Includes all competitions.

As of 26 May 2026

=== Clean sheets ===
Includes all competitive matches. The list is sorted by squad number when total clean sheets are equal.

As of 21 May 2026

=== Disciplinary record ===
Includes all competitions. The list is sorted by squad number when total cards are equal. Players with no cards not included in the list.

As of 21 May 2026
