= 2026 Auckland FC (OFC Professional League) season =

Auckland FC
2026 season
- Owner: Black Knight Football and Entertainment
- Chairman: Bill Foley
- Head Coach: Luke Casserly
- OFC Professional League: 1st (Circuit Series); 2nd (Leaders Group)
- Top goalscorer: Liam Gillion (5 Goals); Emiliano Tade (5 goals)
- Highest home attendance: 5,910 vs South Island United (17 January 2026); OFC Pro League
- Lowest home attendance: 380 vs South Island United (12 May 2026); OFC Pro League
- Average home league attendance: 1,786 (Note: Matches played at North Harbour Stadium, Eden Park, or Mount Smart Stadium in Auckland.)
- Biggest win: 0–4 vs Tahiti United (A), 3 February 2026, OFC Pro League
Home colours	Away colours
- All statistics correct as of 26 May 2026.

The 2026 Auckland Football Club (OFC Professional League) season was the club's first season in the inaugural season of the OFC Professional League.

== Overview ==
Auckland started their season with a 3–0 win over New Zealand rivals South Island United in their first ever Pro League game. This was followed out by two more wins in Auckland, seeing the Black Knights end Round 1 leading the pack. Everton O'Leary picked up the clubs first red card in the third matchday against Bula FC, receiving his second booking in the 65th minute.

== Management team ==
Position	Staff
Head coach	(Australia) Luke Casserly
Assistant coach	(Argentina) Emiliano Tade
Goalkeeper Coach	(Scotland) Jonathan Gould
Team manager	(New Zealand) Mitchell Callaghan
Physiotherapist	(New Zealand) Gabriel Wyatt

== Squad information ==
Players and squad numbers last updated on 31 January 2026. Appearances include all competitions.

Note: Flags indicate national team as has been defined under FIFA eligibility rules. Players may hold more than one non-FIFA nationality.

=== First team ===
No.	Player	Nat.	Positions	Date of birth (age)	Place of birth	Signed in	Signed from
Goalkeepers
1	Oscar Mason	(New Zealand)	GK	16 August 2004 (aged 21)	(New Zealand) Napier	2025	(New Zealand) Western Springs
40	Blake Callinan	(New Zealand)	GK	28 January 2006 (aged 19)	(New Zealand) Auckland	2025	Academy
50	Eli Jones	(New Zealand)	GK	4 February 2007 (aged 18)	(New Zealand) Palmerston North	2025	Academy
Defenders
3	Tass Mourdoukoutas (captain) (V)	(Australia) (Greece)	DF	3 March 1999 (aged 26)	(Australia) Sydney	2025	(Australia) Marconi Stallions
5	Michael den Heijer	(New Zealand) (Netherlands)	DF	14 April 1998 (aged 27)	(New Zealand) Auckland	2025	(New Zealand) Auckland City
7	Jonathan Robinson (V)	(United States)	DF	3 April 2001 (aged 24)	(United States) Evanston	2026	(New Zealand) Western Suburbs
13	Nathan Lobo	(New Zealand) (England)	DF	16 December 2002 (aged 23)	(New Zealand) Auckland	2026	(New Zealand) Auckland City
23	Ronan Wynne	(New Zealand) (England)	DF	28 May 2001 (aged 24)	(South Africa) Cape Town	2026	Free Agent
24	Zac Zorocich	(New Zealand) (Croatia)	DF	28 October 2002 (aged 23)	(Australia) Gosford	2025	(Australia) Sydney Olympic
25	Luka Vicelich	(New Zealand) (Croatia)	DF	15 May 2008 (aged 17)	(New Zealand) Auckland	2026	Academy
32	Everton O'Leary	(New Zealand) (Republic of Ireland)	DF	4 October 2004 (aged 21)	(New Zealand) Auckland	2025	Academy
Midfielders
2	Aidan Carey	(New Zealand) (Niue)	MF	10 July 2001 (aged 24)	(New Zealand) Auckland	2026	(New Zealand) Western Springs
6	Daniel Normann (V)	(Norway)	MF	21 July 2002 (aged 23)	(Norway) Husnes	2025	(New Zealand) Western Springs
8	James Bayliss	(Australia) (New Zealand)	MF	16 August 2005 (aged 20)	(Australia) Darwin	2026	(Australia) Marconi Stallions
12	Isa Prins	(New Zealand)	MF	12 July 2005 (aged 20)	(New Zealand) Upper Hutt	2025	(New Zealand) Wellington Olympic
17	Reid Drake	(New Zealand)	MF	19 January 1996 (aged 29)	(New Zealand) Napier	2026	(New Zealand) Western Springs
Forwards
11	Oscar Faulds	(New Zealand) (Sweden)	FW	12 September 2004 (aged 21)	(Sweden) Stockholm	2026	(Sweden) IF Karlstad
14	Liam Gillion	(New Zealand)	FW	17 October 2002 (aged 23)	(New Zealand) Auckland	2026	First team
20	Emiliano Tade	(Argentina) (New Zealand)	FW	3 March 1988 (aged 37)	(Argentina) Santiago del Estero	2025	(New Zealand) Auckland United
21	Matt Ellis	(New Zealand)	FW	27 February 2001 (aged 24)	(New Zealand) Auckland	2025	(New Zealand) Auckland City
28	Bailey Ferguson	(Australia) (New Zealand)	FW	28 October 2007 (aged 18)	(Australia) Carbrook	2025	(Australia) Eastern Suburbs
29	Kian Donkers	(New Zealand) (Netherlands)	FW	12 September 2004 (aged 21)	(Netherlands) Veldhoven	2025	(New Zealand) Birkenhead United
37	Ralph Rutherford	(New Zealand) (England)	FW	2 April 2005 (aged 20)	(New Zealand) Auckland	2025	Academy
41	Aston Burns	(New Zealand)	FW	2 August 2006 (aged 19)	(New Zealand) Auckland	2026	Academy

Notes:

- Player (V) – Player who is considered as a Visa player from outside of the Oceania Football Confederation.
- Player (OFC) – Player who is considered as a Oceania Visa player.

=== Other players with first-team appearances ===
Includes players to have been featured in a matchday squad for Auckland FC.

No.	Player	Nat.	Positions	Date of birth (age)	Place of birth
Goalkeepers
16	Adama Coulibaly	(New Zealand) (Mali)	MF	20 January 2005 (aged 21)	(New Zealand)
18	Finn McKenlay	(New Zealand) (England)	MF	4 September 2005 (aged 20)	(England) London
47	Dejaun Naidoo	(New Zealand) (Fiji)	MF	15 July 2007 (aged 18)	(New Zealand)
57	Van Fitzharris	(New Zealand)	FW	23 January 2008 (aged 18)	(New Zealand)
58	Nathan Martin	(New Zealand)	MF	19 April 2008 (aged 17)	(New Zealand)

== Transfers ==
Note: Transfers' in/out date may refer to the date of announcement and not the date of signing from the mentioned players.

=== Transfers in ===
No.	Position	Name	From	Type/fee	Date	Ref.
20	FW	(Argentina) Emiliano Tade	(New Zealand) Auckland United	Free transfer	10 December 2025	
29	FW	(New Zealand) Kian Donkers	(New Zealand) Birkenhead United	Free transfer	10 December 2025	
28	FW	(Australia) Bailey Ferguson	(Australia) Eastern Suburbs	Free transfer	10 December 2025	
24	DF	(New Zealand) Zac Zoricich	(Australia) Sydney Olympic	Free transfer	10 December 2025	
3	DF	(Australia) Tass Mourdoukoutas	(Australia) Marconi Stallions	Free transfer	10 December 2025	
1	GK	(New Zealand) Oscar Mason	(New Zealand) Western Springs	Free transfer	17 December 2025	
21	FW	(New Zealand) Matt Ellis	(New Zealand) Auckland City	Free transfer	17 December 2025	
12	MF	(New Zealand) Isa Prins	(New Zealand) Wellington Olympic	Free transfer	17 December 2025	
6	MF	(Norway) Daniel Normann	(New Zealand) Western Springs	Free transfer	17 December 2025	
5	DF	(New Zealand) Michael den Heijer	(New Zealand) Auckland City	Free transfer	17 December 2025	
23	DF	(New Zealand) Ronan Wynne	Free Agent	Free transfer	8 January 2026	
8	MF	(Australia) James Bayliss	(Australia) Marconi Stallions	Free transfer	8 January 2026	
27	MF	(New Zealand) Reid Drake	(New Zealand) Western Springs	Free transfer	8 January 2026	
13	DF	(New Zealand) Nathan Lobo	(New Zealand) Auckland City	Free transfer	8 January 2026	
11	FW	(New Zealand) Oscar Faulds	(Sweden) IF Karlstad	Free transfer	14 January 2026	
2	MF	(New Zealand) Aidan Carey	(New Zealand) Western Springs	Free transfer	14 January 2026	
7	DF	(United States) Jonathan Robinson	(New Zealand) Western Suburbs	Free transfer	14 January 2026	
14	FW	(New Zealand) Liam Gillion	First team	Free transfer	14 January 2026	

=== From youth squad ===
N	Pos.	Nat.	Name	Age	Notes
37	FW	(New Zealand)	Ralph Rutherford	20	1-year contract
32	DF	(New Zealand)	Everton O'Leary	21	1-year contract
40	GK	(New Zealand)	Blake Callinan	19	1-year contract
50	GK	(New Zealand)	Eli Jones	18	1-year contract
41	FW	(New Zealand)	Aston Burns	18	1-year contract
25	DF	(New Zealand)	Luka Vicelich	17	1-year contract

=== Transfers out ===
No.	Position	Name	From	Type/fee	Date	Ref.
20	FW	(Argentina) Emiliano Tade	Retired		4 June 2026	

== Competitions ==
=== Overall record ===
Competition	First match	Last match	Starting round	Record							
Competition	First match	Last match	Starting round	Pld	W	D	L	GF	GA	GD	Win %
OFC Pro League	17 January 2026	24 May 2026	Matchday 1	17	12	2	3	34	14	+20	70.59
Total				17	12	2	3	34	14	+20	70.59

Last updated: 24 May 2026
Source: Competitions

=== OFC Professional League ===
==== Circuit Series ====
===== Circuit Series table =====
Pos	Team	Pld	W	D	L	GF	GA	GD	Pts	Qualification
1	(New Zealand) Auckland FC	14	10	2	2	26	10	+16	32	Qualification for Leaders play-off group
2	(Australia) South Melbourne	14	7	4	3	40	18	+22	25	Qualification for Leaders play-off group
3	(Fiji) Bula FC	14	6	3	5	14	15	−1	21	Qualification for Leaders play-off group
4	(New Zealand) South Island United	14	5	5	4	24	26	−2	20	Qualification for Leaders play-off group
5	(Solomon Islands) Solomon Kings	14	5	3	6	14	21	−7	18	Qualification for Challengers play-off group

Source: OFC Pro League
Rules for classification: 1) Points; 2) Goal difference; 3) Goals scored; 4) Head to head; 5) Head to head goal difference; 6) Head to head goals scored; 7) Disciplinary record; 8) Coin toss

===== Results summary =====
Overall								Home						Away					
Pld	W	D	L	GF	GA	GD	Pts	W	D	L	GF	GA	GD	W	D	L	GF	GA	GD
14	10	2	2	26	10	+16	32	6	0	1	14	6	+8	4	2	1	12	4	+8

Last updated: 21 April 2026.
Source: OFC Pro League

===== Results by round =====
Round	1	2	3	4	5	6	7	9	10	11	12	13	14	8^{1}
Ground	H	H	H	A	A	H	A	H	A	A	H	H	A	A
Result	W	W	W	W	W	L	D	W	W	D	W	W	L	W
Position	1	1	1	1	1	1	1	1	1	1	1	1	1	1
Points	3	6	9	12	15	15	16	19	22	23	26	29	29	32

Source: OFC Pro League
A = Away; H = Home; N = Neutral; B = Bye; W = Win; D = Draw; L = Loss; X = Bye
Notes:
- ^{1} Matchday 8 (vs South Island United) was postponed due to adverse weather conditions.

===== Matches =====
The fixtures were announced on 24 November 2025.

Win Draw Loss Fixtures

Circuit 1

17 January 2026 1	Auckland FC	3–0	South Island United	Auckland, New Zealand
19:00 (NZDT)	Faulds 31'; Ferguson 83'; Gillion 88' (pen.)	(Report) (OFC)		Stadium: Eden Park; Attendance: 5,910; Referee: Ben Aukwai (Solomon Islands)

20 January 2026 2	Auckland FC	3–1	Vanuatu United	Albany, New Zealand
19:00 (NZDT)	Vicelich 8'; Tade 20' (pen.); Ellis 69'	(Report) (OFC)	Tasip 51'	Stadium: North Harbour Stadium; Attendance: 761; Referee: Mederic Lacour (New Caledonia)

23 January 2026 3	Auckland FC	1–0	Bula FC	Albany, New Zealand
19:00 (NZDT)	Normann 12'	(Report) (OFC)		Stadium: North Harbour Stadium; Attendance: 1,973; Referee: Ben Aukwai

Circuit 2

31 January 2026 4	PNG Hekari	0–2	Auckland FC	Port Moresby, Papua New Guinea
15:30 (PGT)		Report (OFC)	Ferguson 90+2'; Tade 90+10' (pen.)	Stadium: PNG Football Stadium; Attendance: 1,500; Referee: Jose Cabero (Chile)

3 February 2026 5	Tahiti United	0–4	Auckland FC	Port Moresby, Papua New Guinea
11:30 (PGT)		(Report) (OFC)	Donkers 3'; Bayliss 50'; Burns 51'; Ferguson 63'	Stadium: PNG Football Stadium; Attendance: 254; Referee: Veer Singh (Fiji)

7 February 2026 6	Auckland FC	1–3	Solomon Kings	Port Moresby, Papua New Guinea
11:30 (PGT)	Gillion 87'	(Report) (OFC)	Higashide 41' (pen.); Leslie 45+1'; Lofthouse 55'	Stadium: PNG Football Stadium; Attendance: 515; Referee: David Yareboinen (Papua New Guinea)

Circuit 3

21 February 2026 7	South Melbourne	1–1	Auckland FC	Melbourne, Australia
19:00 (AEDT)	Eliopoulos 90+6'	(Report) (OFC)	Gillion 89'	Stadium: Olympic Village; Attendance: 400; Referee: Calvin Berg (New Zealand)

27 February 2026 9	Auckland FC	1–0	Tahiti United	Melbourne, Australia
15:00 (AEDT)	Ellis 62'	(Report) (OFC)		Stadium: Home of the Matildas; Attendance: 150; Referee: Ben Aukwai (Solomon Islands)

Circuit 4

14 March 2026 10	Solomon Kings	0–1	Auckland FC	Honiara, Solomon Islands
19:00 (SBT)		(Report) (OFC)	Burns 87'	Stadium: National Stadium; Attendance: 6,700; Referee: David Yareboinen (Papua New Guinea)

18 March 2026 11	Vanuatu United	0–0	Auckland FC	Honiara, Solomon Islands
15:05 (SBT)		(Report) (OFC)		Stadium: National Stadium; Attendance: 1,900; Referee: Ben Aukwai

Circuit 5

12 April 2026 12	Auckland FC	3–2	South Melbourne	Fiji
15:00 (FJT)	Gillion 1'; Ellis 59'; Wynne 84'	(Report) (OFC)	Mesourouni 10'; Leech 23'	Stadium: Four R Stadium Govind Park; Attendance: 650; Referee: Calvin Berg

15 April 2026 13	Auckland FC	2–0	PNG Hekari	Fiji
15:00 (FJT)	Faulds 42'; Gillion 49'	(Report) (OFC)		Stadium: Four R Stadium Govind Park; Attendance: 237; Referee: Ben Aukwai

18 April 2026 14	Bula FC	2–1	Auckland FC	Fiji
19:00 (FJT)	Vasconcellos 14'; Krishna 35'	(Report) (OFC)	Tade 45'	Stadium: Four R Stadium Govind Park; Attendance: 1,157; Referee: Campbell-Kirk Kawana-Waugh

21 April 2026 8	South Island United	1–3	Auckland FC	Fiji
15:00 (FJT)	Yoo 76'	(Report) (OFC)	Faulds 28'; van Dijk 59' (o.g.); Prins 81'	Stadium: Four R Stadium Govind Park; Attendance: 117; Referee: Anna-Marie Keighley
Note: Originally scheduled to be played in Melbourne at Home of the Matildas on 24 February 2026 during Circuit 3, but was postponed due to adverse weather in Melbourne.

==== Leaders play-off group ====
===== Leaders play-off group table =====
Pos	Team	Pld	W	D	L	GF	GA	GD	Pts	Qualification
1	(Australia) South Melbourne	3	3	0	0	10	5	+5	9	Qualification for semi-finals
2	(New Zealand) Auckland FC	3	2	0	1	8	4	+4	6	Qualification for semi-finals
3	(New Zealand) South Island United	3	1	0	2	5	9	−4	3	Qualification for semi-finals
4	(Fiji) Bula FC	3	0	0	3	2	7	−5	0	Qualification for qualification play-off

Source: OFC Pro League
Rules for classification: 1) Points; 2) Goal difference; 3) Goals scored; 4) Head to head; 5) Head to head goal difference; 6) Head to head goals scored; 7) Disciplinary record; 8) Coin toss

===== Results summary =====
Overall								Home						Away					
Pld	W	D	L	GF	GA	GD	Pts	W	D	L	GF	GA	GD	W	D	L	GF	GA	GD
3	2	0	1	8	2	+6	6	2	0	1	8	2	+6	0	0	0	0	0	0

Last updated: 13 May 2026.
Source: OFC Pro League

===== Results by round =====
Round	1	2	3
Ground	H	H	H
Result	L	W	W
Position	3	2	2
Points	0	3	6

Source: OFC Pro League
A = Away; H = Home; N = Neutral; B = Bye; W = Win; D = Draw; L = Loss; X = Bye

===== Matches =====
The fixtures were announced on 22 April 2026 .

6 May 2026 1	Auckland FC	1–2	South Melbourne	Auckland, New Zealand
19:00 (NZDT)	Zoricich 41'	(OFC) (Report)	Eliopoulos 21'; Pasquali 23'	Stadium: Mount Smart Stadium; Attendance: 426; Referee: Campbell-Kirk Kawana-Waugh (New Zealand)

9 May 2026 2	Auckland FC	2–0	Bula FC	Auckland, New Zealand
14:30 (NZDT)	Bidois 7'; O'Leary 36'	(OFC) (Report)		Stadium: Eden Park; Attendance: 754; Referee: Cory Mills (New Zealand)

12 May 2026 3	Auckland FC	5–2	South Island United	Auckland, New Zealand
19:00 (NZDT)	Tade 38'; Burns 58', 67'; Krayem 62' (o.g.); Prins 86'	(OFC) (Report)	Yoo 50'; Grover 57'	Stadium: Eden Park; Attendance: 380; Referee: Anna-Marie Keighley (New Zealand)

==== Knockout Stage ====
20 May 2026 Semi Final	Auckland FC	1–0	South Island United	Auckland, New Zealand
18:30 (NZST)	Prins 71'	(OFC) (Report)		Stadium: Mount Smart Stadium; Attendance: 614; Referee: Calvin Berg (New Zealand)

24 May 2026 Grand Final	South Melbourne	1–2	Auckland FC	Auckland, New Zealand
15:00 (NZST)	Uchida 90+7'	(OFC) (Report)	Normann 23'; Ellis 72'	Stadium: Eden Park; Attendance: 3,470; Referee: Campbell-Kirk Kawana-Waugh (New Zealand)

== Statistics ==
=== Appearances and goals ===
Includes all competitions.

As of 26 May 2026

No.	Pos	Nat	Player	Total		OFC Pro League	
No.	Pos	Nat	Player	Apps	Goals	Apps	Goals
Goalkeepers
1	GK	(New Zealand) NZL	Oscar Mason	14	0	14	0
40	GK	(New Zealand) NZL	Blake Callinan	4	0	4	0
50	GK	(New Zealand) NZL	Eli Jones	1	0	1	0
Defenders
3	DF	(Australia) AUS	Tass Mourdoukoutas	11	0	10+1	0
5	DF	(New Zealand) NZL	Michael den Heijer	15	0	10+5	0
7	DF	(United States) USA	Jonathan Robinson	13	0	10+3	0
13	DF	(New Zealand) NZL	Nathan Lobo	6	0	4+2	0
16	DF	(New Zealand) NZL	Adama Coulibaly	5	0	3+2	0
23	DF	(New Zealand) NZL	Ronan Wynne	17	1	14+3	1
24	DF	(New Zealand) NZL	Zac Zoricich	14	1	11+3	1
25	DF	(New Zealand) NZL	Luka Vicelich	5	1	2+3	1
32	DF	(New Zealand) NZL	Everton O'Leary	15	1	11+4	1
Midfielders
2	MF	(New Zealand) NZL	Aidan Carey	8	0	5+3	0
6	MF	(Norway) NOR	Daniel Normann	19	1	19	1
8	MF	(Australia) AUS	James Bayliss	19	1	16+3	1
12	MF	(New Zealand) NZL	Isa Prins	18	3	10+8	3
17	MF	(New Zealand) NZL	Reid Drake	19	0	14+5	0
47	MF	(New Zealand) NZL	Dejaun Naidoo	6	0	1+5	0
Forwards
11	FW	(New Zealand) NZL	Oscar Faulds	12	3	9+3	3
14	FW	(New Zealand) NZL	Liam Gillion	12	5	9+3	5
20	FW	(Argentina) ARG	Emiliano Tade	16	5	10+6	5
21	FW	(New Zealand) NZL	Matt Ellis	18	4	13+5	4
28	FW	(Australia) AUS	Bailey Ferguson	6	3	3+3	3
29	FW	(New Zealand) NZL	Kian Donkers	10	1	5+5	1
35	FW	(New Zealand) NZL	Jonty Bidois	4	1	4	1
37	FW	(New Zealand) NZL	Ralph Rutherford	0	0	0	0
41	FW	(New Zealand) NZL	Aston Burns	10	4	4+6	4
57	FW	(New Zealand) NZL	Van Fitzharris	4	0	0+4	0

=== Clean sheets ===
Includes all competitive matches. The list is sorted by squad number when total clean sheets are equal.

As of 21 May 2026

Rank	No.	Player	OFC Pro League	Total
1	1	(New Zealand) Oscar Mason	8	8
2	40	(New Zealand) Blake Callinan	2	2
Total			3	3

=== Disciplinary record ===
Includes all competitions. The list is sorted by squad number when total cards are equal. Players with no cards not included in the list.

As of 21 May 2026

No.	Pos.	Player	OFC Pro League		
No.	Pos.	Player	Yellow card	Second yellow card	Red card
23	DF	(New Zealand) Ronan Wynne	4	0	0
17	MF	(New Zealand) Reid Drake	3	0	0
24	DF	(New Zealand) Zac Zoricich	3	0	0
7	DF	(United States) Jonathan Robinson	2	0	0
12	MF	(New Zealand) Isa Prins	2	0	0
25	DF	(New Zealand) Luka Vicelich	2	0	0
11	FW	(New Zealand) Oscar Faulds	2	0	0
8	MF	(Australia) James Bayliss	2	0	0
32	DF	(New Zealand) Everton O'Leary	1	1	0
3	MF	(Australia) Tass Mourdoukoutas	0	0	1
1	GK	(New Zealand) Oscar Mason	1	0	0
6	MF	(Norway) Daniel Normann	1	0	0
20	FW	(Argentina) Emilano Tade	1	0	0
21	FW	(New Zealand) Matt Ellis	1	0	0
28	FW	(Australia) Bailey Ferguson	1	0	0
Total			24	1	1
