= 2027 OFC Professional League =

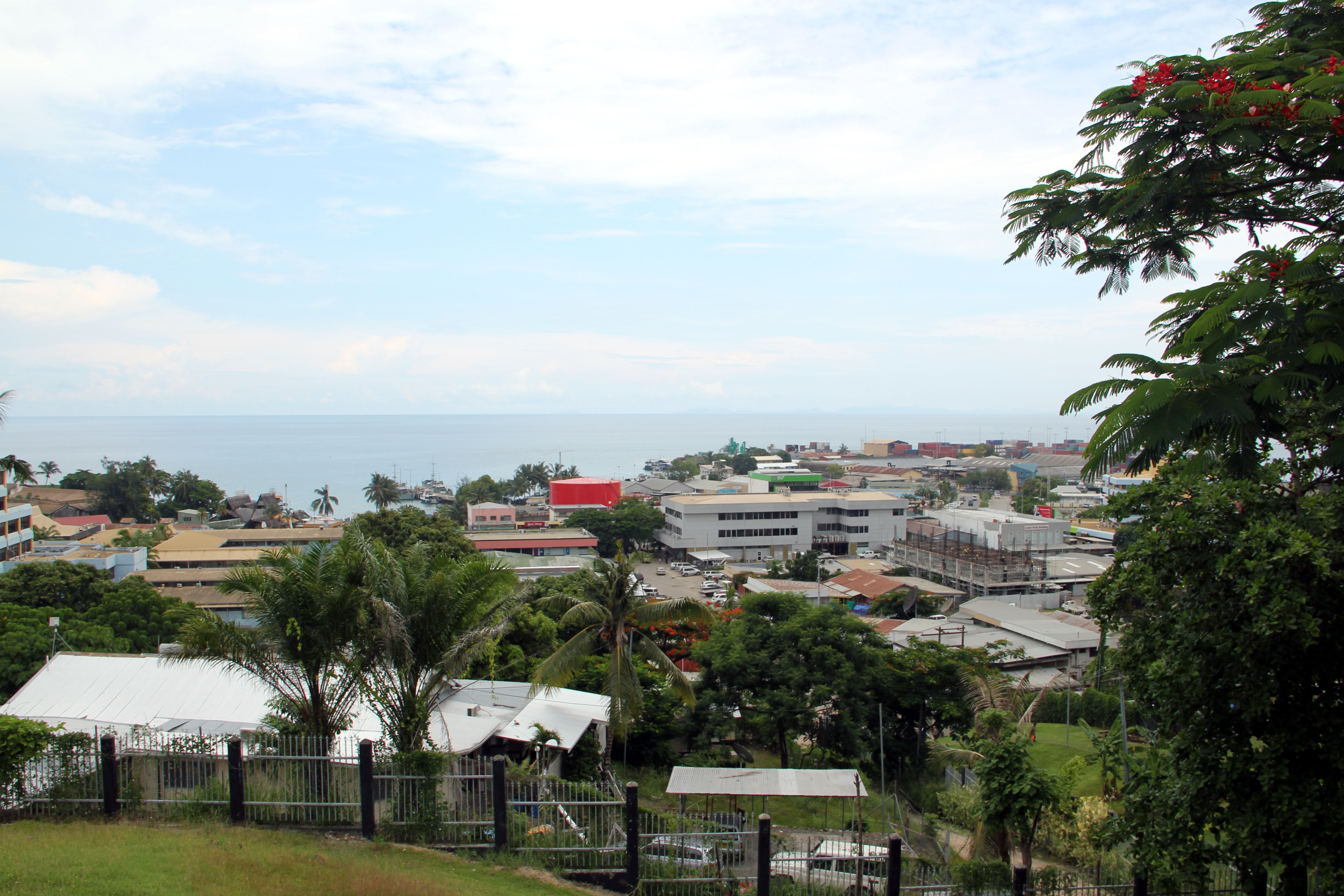
- Solomon Islands will host the final

Tournament details
- Dates: Circuit series: 22 January – 8 May; Finals: 25 May – 6 June
- Teams: 8 (from 7 associations)

The 2027 OFC Professional League will be the second season of the OFC Professional League, a men's professional football league in the Oceania region, organized by the Oceania Football Confederation (OFC) and featuring eight clubs from seven nations, competing in a circuit series format across various Pacific locations.

The winners will qualify for the 2027 FIFA Intercontinental Cup and be provided a potential pathway to the 2029 FIFA Club World Cup. (Note: with the exception of South Melbourne, who can not qualify for other competitions as they are based in Australia, which is part of the Asian Football Confederation.)

== Clubs ==
All eight clubs that contested the 2026 OFC Professional League were granted licences in August 2026 to compete in the 2027 season. A new licensing pathway was also opened to allow prospective clubs to bid in case one of the current sides were to pull out or the league were to expand.

Locations of clubs competing in the 2026 season

=== Clubs and locations ===
Club	City
(New Zealand) Auckland FC (Note: The team had a restriction on players not signed to A-League contracts.)	Auckland
(Fiji) Bula FC	Suva
(Papua New Guinea) PNG Hekari	Port Moresby
(Solomon Islands) Solomon Kings	Honiara
(New Zealand) South Island United	Christchurch
(Australia) South Melbourne	Melbourne
(French Polynesia) Tahiti United	Pīraʻe
Vanuatu United	Port Vila

=== Personnel and kits ===
Club	Manager	Captain	Kit manufacturer	Shirt sponsor
(New Zealand) Auckland FC	Vacant	(Australia) Tass Mourdoukoutas	New Balance	ANZ
(Fiji) Bula FC	(Guadeloupe) Stéphane Auvray	(Fiji) Roy Krishna		
(Papua New Guinea) PNG Hekari	(Fiji) Sunil Kumar	(Papua New Guinea) David Tomare		
(Solomon Islands) Solomon Kings	(England) Ben Cahn	(Solomon Islands) Philip Mango		
(New Zealand) South Island United	(England) Scott Hales	(New Zealand) Christian Gray		
(Australia) South Melbourne	(Wales) Jamie Reed	(Australia) Marko Janković	New Balance	
(French Polynesia) Tahiti United	(French Polynesia) Samuel Garcia	(French Polynesia) Teaonui Tehau		
Vanuatu United	(Spain) Albert Riera	(Vanuatu) Michel Coulon		

=== Managerial changes ===
Team	Outgoing manager	Manner of departure	Date of vacancy	Position on table	Incoming manager	Date of appointment
(New Zealand) Auckland FC	(Australia) Luke Casserly	Promoted to first team assistant	29 July 2026	Pre-Season	TBC	
(New Zealand) South Island United	(Wales) Rob Sherman	Mutual Consent	8 August 2026	Pre-Season	(England) Scott Hales	10 October 2026
(Papua New Guinea) PNG Hekari	(Solomon Islands) Jerry Allen (interim)	End of Interim Spell	27 August 2026	Pre-Season	(United States) Matt Badiee	27 August 2026
Vanuatu United	(Germany) Lars Hopp	Sacked	5 October 2026	Pre-Season	(Spain) Albert Riera	5 October 2026
(Australia) South Melbourne	(Australia) Siniša Cohadzić	Signed by Avondale FC	12 October 2026	Pre-Season	(Wales) Jamie Reed	21 October 2026
(Papua New Guinea) PNG Hekari	(United States) Matt Badiee	Agreement Not Reached	18 November 2026	Pre-Season	(Fiji) Sunil Kumar	18 November 2026

=== Foreign players ===
Club	Player 1	Player 2	Player 3	OFC player 1	OFC player 2	OFC player 3
(New Zealand) Auckland FC						
(Fiji) Bula FC	(Brazil) Willian Medina	(Ivory Coast) Souleymane Koné	(Trinidad and Tobago) Kaïlé Auvray	(New Zealand) Michael Boffey	(New Zealand) Jack de Groot	
(Papua New Guinea) PNG Hekari				(Solomon Islands) Hudson Oreinima	(Vanuatu) Walter Leoru	
(Solomon Islands) Solomon Kings	(Australia) Jacob Krayem	(Australia) Jez Lofthouse	(Japan) Sota Higashide			
(New Zealand) South Island United	(Australia) Jesse Daley	(Australia) Joel Russell		(Papua New Guinea) Alwin Komolong	(Samoa) Alonzo Taulapapa	
(Australia) South Melbourne				(New Zealand) Kosta Barbarouses	(New Zealand) David Yoo	
(French Polynesia) Tahiti United	(France) Loan Marin					
Vanuatu United	(Australia) Hassan Ramazani	(Denmark) William Tønning	(United States) William Cardona	(New Zealand) Otto Ingham	(New Zealand) Owen Smith	(Papua New Guinea) Raymond Diho

== Format ==
The competition will follow a similar format as 2026, with five circuit series rounds, although this time with three circuits split over multiple locations. A new format is being introduced for finals, which will see teams playoff only in knockout matches and higher finishing teams during the circuit series phase entering later.

== Venues ==
Venues have not yet been announced, although host countries have been confirmed for each round.

Circuit One will be hosted by Papua New Guinea & Australia

Circuit Two will be hosted solely by Australia

Circuit Three will be hosted by Solomon Islands & Christchurch, New Zealand

Circuit Four will be hosted solely by New Zealand

Circuit Five will be hosted by Vanuatu and Fiji

Finals will be hosted by Solomon Islands, with the final in Honiara

== Circuit series ==
=== League tables ===
Pos	Team	Pld	W	D	L	GF	GA	GD	Pts	Qualification
1	(New Zealand) Auckland FC	0	0	0	0	0	0	0	0	Advance to semi-finals
2	(Fiji) Bula FC	0	0	0	0	0	0	0	0	Advance to semi-finals
3	(Papua New Guinea) PNG Hekari	0	0	0	0	0	0	0	0	Advance to quarter-finals
4	(Solomon Islands) Solomon Kings	0	0	0	0	0	0	0	0	Advance to quarter-finals
5	(New Zealand) South Island United	0	0	0	0	0	0	0	0	Advance to play-offs round
6	(Australia) South Melbourne	0	0	0	0	0	0	0	0	Advance to play-offs round
7	(French Polynesia) Tahiti United	0	0	0	0	0	0	0	0	Advance to play-offs round
8	Vanuatu United	0	0	0	0	0	0	0	0	Advance to play-offs round

Source: OFC Pro League
Rules for classification: 1) Points; 2) Goal difference; 3) Goals scored; 4) Head to head; 5) Head to head goal difference; 6) Head to head goals scored; 7) Disciplinary record; 8) Coin toss

=== Results ===
Circuit 1
Home team	Score	Away team
Vanuatu United	22 Jan	(Solomon Islands) Solmon Kings
South Melbourne (Australia)	22 Jan	(New Zealand) Auckland FC
Tahiti United (French Polynesia)	24 Jan	(New Zealand) South Island United
PNG Hekari (Papua New Guinea)	24 Jan	(Fiji) Bula FC
Auckland FC (New Zealand)	25 Jan	Vanuatu United
South Melbourne (Australia)	25 Jan	(Solomon Islands) Solmon Kings
Bula FC (Fiji)	27 Jan	(French Polynesia) Tahiti United
PNG Hekari (Papua New Guinea)	27 Jan	(New Zealand) South Island United
Solmon Kings (Solomon Islands)	28 Jan	(New Zealand) Auckland FC
South Melbourne (Australia)	28 Jan	Vanuatu United
Bula FC (Fiji)	30 Jan	(New Zealand) South Island United
PNG Hekari (Papua New Guinea)	30 Jan	(French Polynesia) Tahiti United

Circuit 2
Home team	Score	Away team
Auckland FC (New Zealand)	13 Feb	(French Polynesia) Tahiti United
Solmon Kings (Solomon Islands)	13 Feb	(Fiji) Bula FC
South Island United (New Zealand)	14 Feb	Vanuatu United
South Melbourne (Australia)	14 Feb	(Papua New Guinea) PNG Hekari
Auckland FC (New Zealand)	16 Feb	(Solomon Islands) Solmon Kings
Tahiti United (French Polynesia)	16 Feb	(Fiji) Bula FC
Vanuatu United	17 Feb	(Papua New Guinea) PNG Hekari
South Melbourne (Australia)	17 Feb	(New Zealand) South Island United
Solmon Kings (Solomon Islands)	20 Feb	(New Zealand) South Island United
Tahiti United (French Polynesia)	20 Feb	(Australia) South Melbourne
PNG Hekari (Papua New Guinea)	21 Feb	(New Zealand) Auckland FC
Bula FC (Fiji)	21 Feb	Vanuatu United

Circuit 3
Home team	Score	Away team
Tahiti United (French Polynesia)	6 Mar	Vanuatu United
Solmon Kings (Solomon Islands)	6 Mar	(Papua New Guinea) PNG Hekari
South Melbourne (Australia)	7 Mar	(Fiji) Bula FC
South Island United (New Zealand)	7 Mar	(New Zealand) Auckland FC
PNG Hekari (Papua New Guinea)	9 Mar	Vanuatu United
Solmon Kings (Solomon Islands)	9 Mar	(French Polynesia) Tahiti United
Bula FC (Fiji)	10 Mar	(New Zealand) Auckland FC
South Island United (New Zealand)	10 Mar	(Australia) South Melbourne
Tahiti United (French Polynesia)	12 Mar	(Papua New Guinea) PNG Hekari
Solmon Kings (Solomon Islands)	12 Mar	Vanuatu United
Auckland FC (New Zealand)	13 Mar	(Australia) South Melbourne
South Island United (New Zealand)	13 Mar	(Fiji) Bula FC

Circuit 4
Home team	Score	Away team
Vanuatu United	6 Apr	(Fiji) Bula FC
South Island United (New Zealand)	6 Apr	(Solomon Islands) Solmon Kings
South Melbourne (Australia)	7 Apr	(French Polynesia) Tahiti United
Auckland FC (New Zealand)	7 Apr	(Papua New Guinea) PNG Hekari
Tahiti United (French Polynesia)	10 Apr	(Solomon Islands) Solmon Kings
Auckland FC (New Zealand)	10 Apr	(Fiji) Bula FC
Vanuatu United	11 Apr	(Australia) South Melbourne
South Island United (New Zealand)	11 Apr	(Papua New Guinea) PNG Hekari

Circuit 5
Home team	Score	Away team
Solmon Kings (Solomon Islands)	1 May	(Australia) South Melbourne
Bula FC (Fiji)	1 May	(Papua New Guinea) PNG Hekari
South Island United (New Zealand)	2 May	(French Polynesia) Tahiti United
Vanuatu United	2 May	(New Zealand) Auckland FC
PNG Hekari (Papua New Guinea)	4 May	(Solomon Islands) Solmon Kings
Bula FC (Fiji)	4 May	(Australia) South Melbourne
Auckland FC (New Zealand)	5 May	(New Zealand) South Island United
Vanuatu United	5 May	(French Polynesia) Tahiti United
PNG Hekari (Papua New Guinea)	7 May	(Australia) South Melbourne
Bula FC (Fiji)	7 May	(Solomon Islands) Solmon Kings
Tahiti United (French Polynesia)	8 May	(New Zealand) Auckland FC
Vanuatu United	8 May	(New Zealand) South Island United

== Finals ==
=== Bracket ===
Play-offs
25 May
5
8
6
7

Quarter-finals
29 May
4
3

Semi-finals
2 June
1
2

Final
6 June

=== Play-off ===
Home team	Score	Away team
5th Place	25 May	8th Place
6th Place	25 May	7th Place

=== Quarter-finals ===
Home team	Score	Away team
4th Place	29 May	PO1 Winner
3rd Place	29 May	PO2 Winner

=== Semi-finals ===
Home team	Score	Away team
1st Place	2 Jun	QF1 Winner
2nd Place	2 Jun	QF2 Winner

=== Final ===
Home team	Score	Away team
SF1 Winner	6 Jun	SF2 Winner

== See also ==
- 2027 OFC Men's Champions League
- 2027 Auckland FC (OFC Professional League) season
- 2027 South Island United FC season
