= Performance record of clubs in the A-League Men =

Australian soccer statistics

Since inception in 2005, there have been 16 clubs who have played in the A-League Men. Nine clubs have won the A-League Men Premiership, they are Sydney FC (4 times), Melbourne City (3 times), Central Coast Mariners (3 times), Melbourne Victory (3 times), Adelaide United (twice), Brisbane Roar (twice), Auckland FC (once), Perth Glory (once) and Western Sydney Wanderers (once)

== Performance record and ranking of clubs according to best result ==
Rank	Football Club	Best Result	05–06	06–07	07–08	08–09	09–10	10–11	11–12	12–13	13–14	14–15	15–16	16–17	17–18	18–19	19–20	20–21	21–22	22–23	23–24	24–25	25–26
1	**Sydney FC**	1st (x4)	2	4	4	4	**1**	9	4	7	4	2	7	**1**	**1**	2	**1**	2	8	4	4	7	
2	**Melbourne Victory**	1st (x3)	7	**1**	5	**1**	2	4	8	3	4	**1**	4	2	4	3	10	12	2	11	4	5	
2	**Central Coast Mariners**	1st (x3)	4	4	**1**	4	8	2	**1**	2	3	8	10	8	10	10	11	4	4	2	**1**	10	
2	**Melbourne City**	1st (x3)	Did not exist					8	4	9	10	4	4	4	4	4	2	**1**	**1**	**1**	4	2	
5	**Adelaide United**	1st (x2)	**1**	2	6	2	10	3	9	4	4	3	**1**	9	4	4	7	4	4	4	8	6	
5	**Brisbane Roar**	1st (x2)	6	5	4	4	9	**1**	2	4	**1**	4	3	3	4	9	4	4	11	8	9	12	
7	**Auckland FC**	1st	Did not exist																			1	
7	**Perth Glory**	1st	5	7	7	7	5	10	3	6	8	7	5	5	8	**1**	6	9	12	9	12	13	
7	**Western Sydney Wanderers**	1st	Did not exist							**1**	2	9	2	6	7	8	9	8	10	4	7	4	
10	**Newcastle Jets**	2nd (x2)	4	3	2	8	6	7	7	8	7	10	8	10	2	7	8	11	9	10	10	9	
10	**Wellington Phoenix**	2nd	Did not exist		8	6	4	6	4	10	9	4	9	7	9	6	3	7	6	6	2	11	
12	Gold Coast United	3rd	Did not exist				3	4	10	Former member													
12	Western United	3rd (x2)	Did not exist														5	10	3	7	11	3	Inactive
14	**Macarthur FC**	5th	Did not exist															6	7	12	5	8	
15	North Queensland Fury	7th	Did not exist				7	11	Former member														
16	New Zealand Knights	8th (x2)	8	8	Former member																		

Team names in bold indicates the club is a current A-League Men member.

League premiers and qualifier for the AFC Champions League Elite
League premiers
Qualified for the AFC Champions League Elite
Qualified for the AFC Champions League Two
Qualified for the A-League Men Finals
Qualified for the Australia Cup play-offs

Source: A-League Men

== See also ==
- List of Australian soccer champions
