= List of Auckland FC records and statistics =

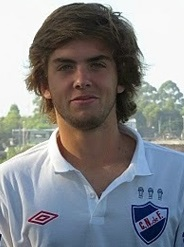
Guillermo May is Auckland FC's current top goalscorer.

Auckland Football Club is a New Zealand professional association football club based in Freemans Bay, Auckland. Auckland FC became the second New Zealand member admitted into A-League Men in 2024.

The list encompasses the records set by the club and their players. The player records section itemises the club's leading goalscorers and those who have made most appearances. Attendance records at Mount Smart Stadium are also included.

All figures are correct as of 30 October 2026.

== Player records ==
=== Appearances ===
- Youngest first-team player: Luka Vicelich, 17 years, 90 days (against South Melbourne, 13 August 2025)
- Oldest first-team player: Hiroki Sakai, 36 years 195 days (against Western Sydney Wanderers, 24 October 2026)
- Most consecutive appearances: Francis de Vries (from 19 October 2024 to 21 March 2026), 54

==== Most appearances ====
Competitive matches only, includes appearances as substitute. Numbers in brackets indicate goals scored.

Rank	Player	Years	Appearances
1	(New Zealand) Logan Rogerson	2024–	64 (12)
2	(New Zealand) Francis de Vries	2024–	61 (3)
3	(Chile) Felipe Gallegos	2024–	59 (2)
4	(Uruguay) Guillermo May	2024–2026	58 (16)
7	(Belgium) Louis Verstraete	2024–2026	55 (4)
7	(Japan) Hiroki Sakai	2024–	55 (4)
7	(New Zealand) Callan Elliot	2024–	55 (1)
8	(New Zealand) Jesse Randall	2024–2026	54 (15)
10	(New Zealand) Cameron Howieson	2024–	50 (1)
10	(Malta) Jake Brimmer	2024–	50 (3)

=== Goalscorers ===
- Youngest goalscorer: Luka Vicelich, 18 years 162 days (against Western Sydney Wanderers, 24 October 2026)
- Oldest goalscorer: Hiroki Sakai, 36 years 201 days (against Brisbane Roar, 30 October 2026)
- Most consecutive goalscoring appearances: 3
  - Neyder Moreno, from 22 January to 1 February 2025
  - Jesse Randall, from 12 December to 1 January 2026
  - Lachlan Brook, from 5 January to 16 January 2026
- Most league goals in one match: 3, Logan Rogerson v. Wellington Phoenix, 22 February 2025
- Most league goals in a season: 11, Sam Cosgrove, (2025–26)

==== Top goalscorers ====
Competitive matches only. Numbers in brackets indicate appearances made.

Rank	Player	Years	Goals
1	(Uruguay) Guillermo May	2024–2026	16 (58)
2	(New Zealand) Jesse Randall	2024–2026	15 (54)
4	(New Zealand) Logan Rogerson	2024–	12 (64)
4	(England) Sam Cosgrove	2025–	12 (31)
5	(Australia) Lachlan Brook	2025–	11 (37)
6	(Colombia) Neyder Moreno	2024–2025	8 (24)
9	(Australia) Nando Pijnaker	2024–	4 (49)
9	(Japan) Hiroki Sakai	2024–	4 (55)
9	(Belgium) Louis Verstraete	2024–2026	4 (55)
11	(Malta) Jake Brimmer	2024–	3 (50)
11	(New Zealand) Francis de Vries	2024–	3 (61)

== Club records ==
=== Matches ===
==== Firsts ====
- First match: Auckland FC 2–2 Auckland United, friendly, 31 July 2024
- First A-League Men match: Auckland FC 2–0 Brisbane Roar, 19 October 2024
- First Australia Cup match: Gold Coast Knights 0–4 Auckland FC, July 29 2025
- First FIFA Intercontinental Cup match: Al-Ahli 1–0 Auckland FC, 27 August 2026

==== Record results ====
- Record win: 6–1 against Wellington Phoenix, 22 February 2025
- Record defeat: 0–4 against Western United, 21 December 2024
- Record consecutive wins: 6, from 19 October to 7 December 2024
- Record consecutive defeats: 1
  - 21 December 2024
  - 11 January 2025
  - 3 May 2025
  - 24 May 2025
  - 13 September 2025
  - 30 November 2025
  - 1 January 2026
  - 16 January 2026
  - 31 January 2026
  - 21 March 2026
  - 19 April 2026
  - 27 August 2026
  - 24 October 2026
- Record consecutive draws: 3, from 1 March to 16 March 2025
- Record consecutive matches without a defeat: 14, from 18 January to 27 April 2025
- Record consecutive matches without a win: 5, from 21 March to 26 April 2026
- Record consecutive matches without conceding a goal: 5, from 19 October to 30 November 2024
- Record consecutive matches without scoring a goal: 2
  - from 1 to 11 January 2025
  - from 13 September to 10 October 2025

=== Attendances ===
This section applies to attendances at Mount Smart Stadium.

- Highest attendance at Mount Smart Stadium: 29,148, against Melbourne Victory, 24 May 2025
- Lowest attendance at Mount Smart Stadium: 10,077, against Melbourne Victory, 11 April 2026

== See also ==
- Soccer records and statistics in Australia
- A-League Men records and statistics
