= 2027 South Island United FC season =

South Island United FC
2027 season
- Owner: Christchurch United
- Chairman: Viatcheslav Meyn
- Head Coach: Scott Hales
- Stadium: Te Kaha Stadium
- OFC Professional League: TBD
- OFC Professional League Finals: TBD
- All statistics correct as of 13 October 2026.

The 2027 South Island United Football Club season is the club's second season in existence and their second season in the OFC Professional League.

The club come into this second season with a new head coach, having mutually parted ways with inaugural head coach Rob Sherman in August, replacing him with Western Springs head coach Scott Hales, who has previously coached Miramar Rangers and Team Wellington.

== Management team ==
=== Technical officials ===
Position	Name	Ref.
Head coach	(England) Scott Hales	
Assistant coach	(Spain) Adrià Casals	
Goalkeeping coach	(New Zealand) Callum Kennett	
Team manager	(Netherlands) Coen Lanmers	
Physiotherapist	(New Zealand) Michael Peterson	

=== Management ===
Position	Name	Ref.
General manager	(New Zealand) Ryan Edwards	

== Squad information ==
Players and squad numbers last updated on 21 November 2026. Appearances include all competitions.

Note: Flags indicate national team as has been defined under FIFA eligibility rules. Players may hold more than one non-FIFA nationality.

=== First team ===
No.	Player	Nat.	Positions	Date of birth (age)	Place of birth	Signed in	Signed from	Apps.	Goals
Goalkeepers
—	Ngereine Maro	(Cook Islands) (New Zealand)	GK	20 March 2005 (aged 21)		2026	(New Zealand) Auckland United	0	0
Defenders
6	Jaylen Rodwell	(New Zealand) (Niue)	DF	31 May 2002 (aged 24)	(New Zealand) Auckland	2025	(New Zealand) Auckland United	17	1
—	Alwin Komolong (OFC)	(Papua New Guinea) (Germany)	DF	2 November 1994 (aged 32)	(Papua New Guinea) Lae	2026	Unattached	0	0
—	Lewis Miccio	(Australia) (New Zealand)	DF	2 December 1998 (aged 28)	(Australia) Sydney	2026	(Australia) St George City	0	0
—	Alonzo Taulapapa (OFC)	(Samoa) (Australia)	DF	20 April 2009 (aged 17)		2026	(Australia) Bulls FC Academy	0	0
Midfielders
—	Jesse Daley (V)	(Australia)	MF	16 October 1997 (aged 29)	(Australia) Brisbane	2026	(Singapore) Tanjong Pagar United	0	0
—	Tor Davenport Petersen	(New Zealand) (Denmark)	MF	24 October 1998 (aged 28)	(Denmark) Copenhagen	2026	Unattached	0	0
—	Wan Gatkek	(New Zealand) (South Sudan)	MF	18 April 2000 (aged 26)	(South Sudan)	2026	(Australia) UNSW FC	0	0
Forwards
—	Joel Russell (V)	(Australia)	FW	27 March 2003 (aged 23)	(Australia)	2026	(Australia) Gold Coast Knights	0	0
—	Roman Telling	(Samoa) (New Zealand)		Unknown (aged 16)		2026	(New Zealand) Ellerslie Youth	0	0

Notes:

- Player (V) – Player who is considered as a Visa player from outside of the Oceania Football Confederation.
- Player (OFC) – Player who is considered as an Oceania Visa player.

== Transfers ==
Note: Transfers' in/out date may refer to the date of announcement and not the date of signing from the mentioned players.

=== Transfers in ===
No.	Pos	Name	From	Type/fee	Date	Ref.
—	MF	(Australia) Jesse Daley	(Singapore) Tanjong Pagar United	Free transfer	12 November 2026	
—	FW	(Australia) Joel Russell	(Australia) Gold Coast Knights	Free transfer	13 November 2026	
—	DF	(Australia) Lewis Miccio	(Australia) St George City	Free transfer	14 November 2026	
—	MF	(New Zealand) Tor Davenport Petersen	Unattached	Free transfer	15 November 2026	
—	MF	(New Zealand) Wan Gatkek	(Australia) University of New South Wales FC	Free transfer	16 November 2026	
—	DF	(Papua New Guinea) Alwin Komolong	Unattached	Free transfer	17 November 2026	
—	GK	(Cook Islands) Ngereine Maro	(New Zealand) Auckland United	Free transfer	18 November 2026	
—	DF	(Samoa) Alonzo Taulapapa	(Australia) Bulls FC Academy	Free transfer	19 November 2026	
—	??	(Samoa) Roman Telling	(New Zealand) Ellerslie Youth	Free transfer	19 November 2026	

=== Returning Players ===
Note: These players played at other clubs during the OFC Pro League off-season but remained with the club for consecutive seasons.

No.	Pos	Name	Joined	Departed	Returned	Ref.
6	DF	(New Zealand) Jaylen Rodwell	(New Zealand) Wellington Olympic	20 June 2026	21 November 2026	

=== Transfers Out ===
No.	Pos	Name	To	Type/fee	Date	Ref.
7	MF	(New Zealand) David Yoo	(Australia) South Melbourne	Free Transfer	24 June 2026	
13	MF	(New Zealand) Oliver Young	(United States) Emmanuel College Saints	Free Transfer	4 September 2026	
1	GK	(Netherlands) Steven van Dijk	(Thailand) Sisaket United	Free Transfer	19 September 2026	
24	DF	(Australia) Jacob Krayem	(Solomon Islands) Solomon Kings	Free Transfer	16 October 2026	

== Competitions ==
=== Overall record ===
Competition	First match	Last match	Record							
Competition	First match	Last match	Pld	W	D	L	GF	GA	GD	Win %
OFC Pro League	22 January 2027	May-June 2027	0	0	0	0	0	0	+0	—
Total			0	0	0	0	0	0	+0	—

Source: Competitions

=== OFC Professional League ===
==== Matches ====
The fixtures were announced on 6 October 2026.

Win Draw Loss Fixtures

Circuit 1

24 January 2027 1	Tahiti United	v	South Island United	TBC, Papua New Guinea
TBD				Stadium: TBC

27 January 2027 2	PNG Hekari	v	South Island United	TBC, Papua New Guinea
TBD				Stadium: TBC

30 January 2027 3	Bula FC	v	South Island United	TBC, Papua New Guinea
TBD				Stadium: TBC

Circuit 2

14 February 2027 4	South Island United	v	Vanuatu United	TBC, Australia
TBD

17 February 2027 5	South Melbourne	v	South Island United	TBC, Australia
TBD

20 February 2027 6	Solomon Kings	v	South Island United	TBC, Australia
TBD

Circuit 3

7 March 2027 7	South Island United	v	Auckland FC	Christchurch, New Zealand
TBD

10 March 2027 8	South Island United	v	South Melbourne	Christchurch, New Zealand
TBD

13 March 2027 9	South Island United	v	Bula FC	Christchurch, New Zealand
TBD

Circuit 4

7 April 2027 10	South Island United	v	Solomon Kings	TBC, New Zealand
TBD				Stadium: TBC

11 April 2027 11	South Island United	v	PNG Hekari	TBC, New Zealand
TBD				Stadium: TBC

Circuit 5

2 May 2027 12	South Island United	v	Vanuatu United	TBC, Vanuatu
				Stadium: TBC

5 May 2027 13	Auckland FC	v	South Island United	TBC, Vanuatu
				Stadium: TBC

8 May 2027 14	Vanuatu United	v	South Island United	TBC, Vanuatu
				Stadium: TBC

== Statistics ==
=== Appearances and goals ===
Includes all competitions.

As of November 2026

No.	Pos	Nat	Player	Total		OFC Pro League	
No.	Pos	Nat	Player	Apps	Goals	Apps	Goals
Goalkeepers
	GK	(Cook Islands) COK	Ine Maro	0	0	0	0
Defenders
6	DF	(New Zealand) NZL	Jaylen Rodwell	0	0	0	0
	DF	(Papua New Guinea) PNG	Alwin Komolong	0	0	0	0
	DF	(Australia) AUS	Lewis Miccio	0	0	0	0
	DF	(Samoa) SAM	Alonzo Taulapapa	0	0	0	0
Midfielders
	MF	(Australia) AUS	Jesse Daley	0	0	0	0
	MF	(New Zealand) NZL	Tor Davenport Petersen	0	0	0	0
	MF	(New Zealand) NZL	Wan Gatkek	0	0	0	0
Forwards
	FW	(Australia) AUS	Joel Russell	0	0	0	0
		(Samoa) SAM	Roman Telling	0	0	0	0
