= Van Fitzharris =

New Zealand footballer (born 2008)

Personal information
- Full name: Van Fleming Fitzharris
- Date of birth: 23 January 2008 (age 18)
- Place of birth: Mt Maunganui, New Zealand
- Height: 1.75 m (5 ft 9 in)
- Position: Midfielder

Team information
- Current team: Auckland FC
- Number: 57

Youth career
- Mount Maunganui Juniors
- FC Tauranga Moana
- Tauranga City

Senior career*
Years	Team	Apps	(Gls)
2024–2025	Tauranga City	22	(1)
2025–	Auckland FC Reserves	10	(3)
2026–	Auckland FC (OFC)	4	(0)
2026–	Auckland FC	6	(0)

International career^{‡}
2024–	New Zealand U-17	6	(2)
2026–	New Zealand U-20	3	(2)
- * Club domestic league appearances and goals as of 7 November 2026 ‡ National team caps and goals as of 8 September 2026

Van Fitzharris (born 23 January 2008) is a New Zealand professional footballer who plays as a forward for A-League Men club Auckland FC.

== Early career ==
Fitzharris began his youth career at Mount Maunganui Juniors before representing Mount Maunganui College and FC Tauranga Moana, a joint academy initiative between Papamoa FC and Otumoetai FC. He later joined Tauranga City, progressing through the club's academy system before breaking into the senior side. Fitzharris made his first-team debut during the 2024 season against East Coast Bays and went on to make 28 senior appearances, scoring three goals for the club.

== Club career ==
=== Auckland FC ===
Fitzharris joined Auckland FC through the Talent Development Centre pathway. He participated in identification matches and training camps throughout 2025 before moving into the Auckland FC Reserves squad in the Northern League in September 2025. Auckland FC head of player recruitment, Doug Kors, said the club had been tracking Fitzharris for 18 months.

Fitzharris was included in the club's inaugural Northern League and National League campaigns, making five appearances and scoring two goals. He was later named in Auckland FC's OFC Professional League squad, where he made three appearances before breaking into the first team.

On 11 April 2026, Fitzharris made his A-League Men debut in a 2–2 draw against Melbourne Victory at Mount Smart Stadium, replacing Jesse Randall in the 60th minute. He was named man of the match by the club following the game. Fitzharris made his A-League Finals debut in a 3–0 over Adelaide United in the second leg of the semi-final, winning 4–1 on aggregate. He was named on the bench for the 2026 A-League Men Grand Final but remained an unused substitute as Auckland defeated Sydney FC 1–0, becoming the first New Zealand club to win the A-League Men Championship.

On 20 July 2026, Fitzharris was promoted to Auckland FC's A-League Men squad on a scholarship contract alongside teammates Isa Prins and Bailey Ferguson.

== International career ==
Fitzharris has represented New Zealand at under-17 level. He made four appearances and scored two goals for the New Zealand U17 side at the 2024 OFC U-16 Men's Championship in Tahiti, helping the team win the tournament. He later made six appearances and scoring two goals, including 2 appearances at the 2025 FIFA U-17 World Cup.

On 21 August 2026, Fitzharris was named in the New Zealand U-19 men's squad for the 2026 OFC U-19 Championship. Fitzharris scored a brace in an 8–0 win over Tahiti during the opening match.

== Career statistics ==
=== Club ===
As of match played on 7 November 2026.

Club	Season	League			Cup		Other		Total	
Club	Season	Division	Apps	Goals	Apps	Goals	Apps	Goals	Apps	Goals
Tauranga City	2024	National League	1	0	0	0	0	0	1	0
Tauranga City	2025	National League	21	1	2	0	0	0	23	1
Tauranga City	Total		22	1	2	0	0	0	24	1
Auckland FC Reserves	2025	National League	5	2	0	0	0	0	5	2
Auckland FC Reserves	2026	National League	4	1	0	0	0	0	4	1
Auckland FC Reserves	Total		9	3	0	0	0	0	9	3
Auckland FC	2026	OFC Professional League	3	0	—		—		3	0
Auckland FC	2025–26	A-League Men	2	0	0	0	1 (Note: Appearances in A-League Finals)	0	3	0
Auckland FC	2026–27	A-League Men	3	0	—		1 (Note: Appearance in FIFA Intercontinental Cup)	0	4	0
Career total			39	4	2	0	2	0	43	4

== Honours ==
Auckland FC

- A-League Men Championship: 2026
- OFC Professional League: 2026
