= Luka Vicelich =

New Zealand footballer (born 2008)

Personal information
- Full name: Luka Robert Vicelich
- Date of birth: 15 May 2008 (age 18)
- Position: Defender

Team information
- Current team: Auckland FC
- Number: 25

Youth career
- Central United
- –2024: Auckland City

Senior career*
Years	Team	Apps	(Gls)
2024	Auckland City	1	(0)
2025–	Auckland FC Reserves	15	(0)
2025–	Auckland FC	7	(1)
2026–	Auckland FC (OFC)	5	(1)

International career^{‡}
2024–	New Zealand U17	4	(0)
2026–	New Zealand U-20	2	(0)
- * Club domestic league appearances and goals as of 24 October 2026 ‡ National team caps and goals as of 5 September 2024

Luka Robert Vicelić (Croatian: [ˈluka vitselitɕ]; /ˈvɪsəlɪtʃ/ VISS-ə-litch; born 15 May 2008) is a New Zealand footballer who plays as a defender for A-League club Auckland FC.

== Club career ==
Vicelich commenced his football career playing for his school, St Peter's College, Auckland.

=== Auckland City ===
After playing youth football for Central United and Auckland City, Vicelich made his debut for Auckland City on 31 August 2024 in the final Northern League game of the season against Melville United.

=== Auckland FC ===
On 14 February 2025, Vicelich was named in the inaugural Auckland FC Reserves side. On 13 August 2025, Vicelich made his professional debut for Auckland FC in the Australia Cup Round of 16 match against South Melbourne. In doing so, he became the club's youngest ever player.

On 21 January 2026, the club announced that Vicelich had become the club’s youngest ever professional, signing a professional A-League Men contract on scholarship terms through to the end of the 2027–28 season. On 14 March 2026, Vicelich made his A-League debut in a 2–1 win over the Newcastle Jets at McDonald Jones Stadium, becoming the youngest player to appear for Auckland FC in the competition.

Vicelich scored his first A-League Men goal during Auckland FC's 5–2 defeat to Western Sydney Wanderers, becoming the club's youngest goalscorer and surpassing Jake Girdwood-Reich by 3 years and 162 days. Following the match against the Wanderers, Vicelich picked up a stress fracture to his lower back. The injury was expected to sideline him for up to four months until early 2027.

== International career ==
On 26 June 2024, Vicelich was named in the New Zealand U17's squad for the 2024 OFC U-16 Men's Championship in Tahiti. He made his debut on 28 July 2024 against Vanuatu. On 3 August 2024, Vicelich captained the side for the first time in a 7–0 win over the Cook Islands.

On 16 October 2025, Vicelich was named in the New Zealand U17's squad for the 2025 FIFA U-17 World Cup.

On 21 August 2026, Vicelich was named in the New Zealand U-19 men’s squad for the 2026 OFC U-19 Championship.

== Personal life ==
Vicelich is the son of former New Zealand international footballer Ivan Vicelich.

== Career statistics ==
=== Club ===
As of match played on 24 October 2026.

Appearances and goals by club, season and competition
Club	Season	League			Cup (Note: Includes appearances in the Chatham Cup and Australia Cup)		Continental		Others		Total	
Club	Season	Division	Apps	Goals	Apps	Goals	Apps	Goals	Apps	Goals	Apps	Goals
Auckland City	2024	National League	1	0	0	0	0	0	0	0	1	0
Auckland FC Reserves	2025	National League	15	0	1	0	—		—		16	0
Auckland FC	2025–26	A-League Men	4	0	2	0	5 (Note: Appearances in OFC Professional League)	1	1 (Note: Appearances in A-League Finals)	0	12	1
Auckland FC	2026–27	A-League Men	2	1	—		0	0	0	0	2	1
Career total			22	1	3	0	0	0	0	0	31	1

== Honours ==
New Zealand U17

- OFC U-16 Men's Championship: 2024

Auckland FC

- A-League Men Championship: 2026
- OFC Professional League: 2026
