= Oscar Mason (footballer) =

New Zealand footballer (born 2004)

Personal information
- Full name: Oscar William Mason
- Date of birth: 16 August 2004 (age 22)
- Place of birth: Napier, New Zealand
- Position: Goalkeeper

Team information
- Current team: Western Springs
- Number: 25

Youth career
- –2019: Napier Marist
- 2019–2020: Hawke's Bay United
- 2020: Central United

Senior career*
Years	Team	Apps	(Gls)
2019–2021	Hawke's Bay United	1	(0)
2020–2023	Napier City Rovers	74	(0)
2024–2025	Western Springs	52	(0)
2026	Auckland FC (OFC)	14	(0)
2026–	Western Springs	4	(0)

International career^{‡}
2022	New Zealand U20	1	(0)
- * Club domestic league appearances and goals as of 1 August 2026 ‡ National team caps and goals as of 11 September 2022

Oscar William Mason (born 16 August 2004) is a professional footballer who plays as a goalkeeper for National League club Western Springs.

== Club career ==
=== Early career ===
Mason played his youth football for Napier Marist, before joining Napier City Rovers. In 2019, Mason represented the New Zealand Secondary School's team. Mason also played youth football for Hawke's Bay United in the New Zealand Youth National League.

=== Napier City Rovers ===
Mason made his debut for Napier City Rovers on 19 July 2020 in a 2–1 win over Miramar Rangers. After making two appearances, he moved north to Auckland and joined Central United.

=== Hawke's Bay United ===
On 14 February 2021, Mason made his debut for Hawke's Bay United in a 3–2 win over Wellington Phoenix Reserves.

=== Western Springs ===
Mason signed with Western Springs for the 2024 season. In 2025 Mason won the Northern League with Springs.

=== Auckland FC ===
On 17 December 2025, Auckland FC announced Mason had signed for the inaugural OFC Professional League season as both a player and a goalkeeper coach. Auckland FC won the inaugural OFC Pro League, beating South Melbourne 2–1 in the final. Mason was awarded the Golden Glove for the 2026 season after keeping 8 clean sheets in 14 appearances.

=== Return to Western Springs ===
On 30 June 2026, Western Springs announced Mason had returned following his 2026 OFC Pro League success.

== International career ==
Mason was called up for the New Zealand U20's for the 2022 OFC U-19 Championship. He made his debut in a 9–0 win over American Samoa U20. New Zealand went on to win the tournament with Mason making the lone appearance.

== Career statistics ==
=== Club ===
As of match played on 1 August 2026.

Appearances and goals by club, season and competition
Club	Season	League			Cup (Note: Includes Chatham Cup)		Others		Total	
Club	Season	Division	Apps	Goals	Apps	Goals	Apps	Goals	Apps	Goals
Hawke's Bay United	2019–20	NZFC	0	0	—		—		0	0
Hawke's Bay United	2020–21	NZFC	1	0	—		—		1	0
Hawke's Bay United	Total		1	0	0	0	0	0	1	0
Napier City Rovers	2020	Central Premier League	2	0	—		—		2	0
Napier City Rovers	2021	National League	18	0	3	0	—		21	0
Napier City Rovers	2022	National League	27	0	3	0	—		30	0
Napier City Rovers	2023	National League	27	0	3	0	—		30	0
Napier City Rovers	Total		74	0	9	0	0	0	83	0
Western Springs	2024	National League	28	0	3	0	—		31	0
Western Springs	2025	National League	24	0	3	0	—		27	0
Western Springs	Total		52	0	6	0	0	0	58	0
Auckland FC (OFC)	2026	—			—		14	0	14	0
Western Springs	2026	National League	4	0	—		—		4	0
Career total			145	0	15	0	0	0	160	0

== Honours ==
Western Springs

- Northern League: 2025

Auckland FC

- OFC Professional League: 2026

New Zealand U20

- OFC U-19 Championship: 2022

Individual

- OFC Professional League Golden Glove: 2026
- OFC Professional League Team of the Season: 2026
