= Pedro Moreira (football manager) =

Portuguese football manager

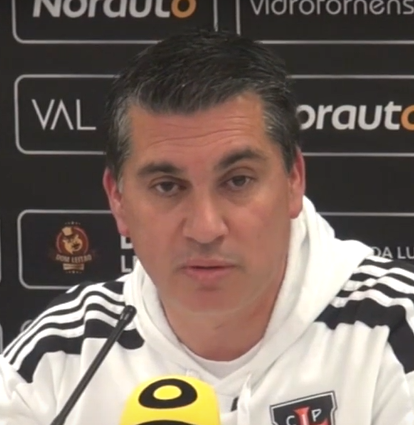
- Moreira in 2023

Personal information
- Full name: Pedro Miguel de Barros Moreira
- Date of birth: 22 March 1975 (age 51)
- Place of birth: Lourenço Marques, Portuguese Mozambique

Team information
- Current team: Auckland FC (head coach)

Managerial career
- Years: Team
- 1998–2000: Carcavelos (youth)
- 2001–2003: Oeiras (youth)
- 2003–2004: Olivais Moscavide (youth)
- 2005–2006: Farense (youth)
- 2009–2012: Sporting CP (youth)
- 2012–2013: Paços de Ferreira (assistant)
- 2013–2014: Porto (assistant)
- 2014–2015: Paços de Ferreira (assistant)
- 2015–2016: Braga (assistant)
- 2016–2017: Shakhtar Donetsk (assistant)
- 2017–2019: Shakhtar Donetsk (assistant)
- 2019–2021: Roma (assistant)
- 2022–2023: Torreense
- 2023–2024: Casa Pia
- 2024–2025: Pakhtakor
- 2026–: Auckland FC

Pedro Miguel de Barros Moreira (born 22 March 1975) is a Portuguese football manager. He is currently head coach of A-League Men club Auckland FC.

After working as a long-term assistant to manager Paulo Fonseca, he started managing in his own right in 2022.

== Coaching career ==
=== Early career ===
Born in Lourenço Marques in the last months of the Portuguese Mozambique, Moreira started his career at Grupo Sportivo de Carcavelos, managing their under-13 and under-19 squad. He was later in charge of the youth sides of Oeiras, Olivais e Moscavide and Farense before becoming a youth coordinator at the Algarve Football Association in 2006.

In 2009, Moreira joined the structure of Sporting CP, and was in charge of the club's under-11 side. In 2012, he became Paulo Fonseca's assistant at Paços de Ferreira, later following him to Porto, Braga, Shakhtar Donetsk, and Roma, spanning nine years of service; the association ended when Moreira did not follow Fonseca to Ligue 1 side Lille.

=== Torreense ===
On 22 September 2022, Moreira was named in his first managerial job, at Liga Portugal 2 side, Torreense, replacing Nuno Manta Santos at the 18th-placed team. His debut nine days later was a 3–1 loss at Belenenses in the Taça de Portugal second round.

Moreira's first Liga Portugal 2 game was a 1–0 home win over Estrela da Amadora on 8 October 2022. After a 9th-placed finish, he left on 29 May 2023 as he opted to not renew his contract.

=== Casa Pia ===
On 21 November 2023, following the resignation of Filipe Martins, Moreira was appointed manager of Casa Pia, which sat in fifteenth place in the Primeira Liga table, signing a contract of an undisclosed length. On 15 February 2024, after 3 wins, 2 draws and 6 losses in 11 matches under Moreira, Casa Pia, sitting 16th in the league table, announced that he had been sacked.

=== Pakhtakor ===
On 4 December 2024, Uzbekistan Super League club Pakhtakor announced the signing of Moreira to a one-year contract, with the option of a second year. On 6 May 2025, Pakhtakor announced that Moreira was taking a leave by mutual agreement.

On 9 July 2025, Moreira left Pakhtakor by mutual agreement. According to reports, the departure was due to disagreements with the club over its future sporting direction.

=== Auckland FC ===
On 30 July 2026, Moreira was announced as the head coach of A-League Men club Auckland FC, becoming the second head coach in the club's history. Moreira's first game was against Al-Ahli at the King Abdullah Sports City Stadium in the opening round of the 2026 FIFA Intercontinental Cup, where Auckland fell to a 1–0 defeat.

== Managerial statistics ==
As of match played 26 August 2026

Managerial record by team and tenure
Team	Nat	From	To	Record								Ref
Team	Nat	From	To	G	W	D	L	GF	GA	GD	Win %	Ref
Torreense	(Portugal)	22 September 2022	29 May 2023	32	13	7	12	41	35	+6	40.63	
Casa Pia	(Portugal)	21 November 2023	15 February 2024	11	3	2	6	11	22	−11	27.27	
Pakhtakor	(Uzbekistan)	4 December 2024	9 July 2025	23	14	2	7	42	24	+18	60.87	
Auckland FC	(New Zealand)	30 July 2026	Present	1	0	0	1	0	1	−1	0.00	
Total				67	30	11	26	94	82	+12	44.78	—
