= Jonathan Robinson (soccer) =

American soccer player (born 2001)

Personal information
- Date of birth: April 3, 2001 (age 25)
- Place of birth: Evanston, Illinois, United States
- Height: 5 ft 8 in (1.73 m)
- Position: Left-back

Team information
- Current team: Cascades FC

Youth career
- Chicago Magic PSG Academy
- –2019: Chicago FC United

College career
Years	Team	Apps	(Gls)
2020–2021	Marquette Golden Eagles	27	(1)
2022–2023	Western Michigan Broncos	44	(3)

Senior career*
Years	Team	Apps	(Gls)
2021	Chicago FC United	5	(1)
2022	AFC Ann Arbor	11	(0)
2023	Flint City Bucks		
2024	Sporting Kansas City II	14	(1)
2025	Western Suburbs	22	(5)
2026	Auckland FC (OFC)	13	(0)
2027–	Cascades FC	0	(0)
- * Club domestic league appearances and goals as of May 28, 2026

Jonathan Robinson (born April 3, 2001) is an American professional soccer player who plays as a defender for Cascades FC in the USL League One.

== Early life ==
Born in Evanston, Illinois, a suburb of Chicago, Robinson attended Warren Township High School.

== College career ==
Robinson started his college career with the Marquette Golden Eagles in 2020, with his debut coming on February 3 against the Loyola Ramblers. Overall, he played 27 matches for the Golden Eagles, scoring one goal.

In 2022, he transferred to Western Michigan University, where he played for the Western Michigan Broncos. Across two seasons with Western Michigan, he played 44 matches, scoring three goals and registering 18 assists. As team captain during the 2023 season, he registered 13 assists, as Western Michigan won the Missouri Valley Conference, and reached the third round of the NCAA Division I men's soccer tournament, where they lost to eventual runners-up Notre Dame in a penalty shooutout.

== Club career ==
In 2023, Robinson joined the Flint City Bucks in the USL League Two. In the 2024 MLS SuperDraft, Robinson was drafted 80th overall by Sporting Kansas City, making his debut in a 5–0 friendly win against Miami FC on February 10. He later spent the 2024 season in the MLS Next Pro with Sporting Kansas City II, where he played 14 matches as they missed the play-offs.

In February 2025, Robinson joined New Zealand club Western Suburbs. In January 2026, Robinson signed for Auckland FC's OFC Pro League team. He made his debut for Auckland as a substitute in their opening match of the 2026 OFC Professional League, where he assisted Bailey Ferguson's goal in a 3–0 win against South Island United. He later started in the 2026 OFC Professional League final, where Auckland FC won 2–1 against South Melbourne.

On October 6, 2026, Robinson was announced as the first ever player for Cascades FC ahead of their inaugural season competing in the USL League One in 2027.

== Career statistics ==
=== Club ===
As of match played on 24 May 2026.

Appearances and goals by club, season and competition
Club	Season	League			Cup		Other		Total	
Club	Season	Division	Apps	Goals	Apps	Goals	Apps	Goals	Apps	Goals
Sporting Kansas City II	2024	MLS Next Pro	14	1	—		—		14	1
Western Suburbs	2025	National League	22	5	4	1	—		26	6
Auckland FC (OFC)	2026	OFC Professional League	13	0	—		0	0	13	0
Career total			49	6	4	1	0	0	53	7

== Honours ==
- OFC Professional League: 2026
