= Barfoot & Thompson =

New Zealand real estate company

Barfoot & Thompson Ltd
- Company type: Private
- Industry: Real Estate
- Founded: 1923
- Founder: Val Barfoot
- Headquarters: Auckland, New Zealand
- Number of locations: Auckland and Northland
- Key people: Peter Thompson (managing director); Stephen Barfoot (director); Chris Dobbie (CEO)
- Services: Residential; Commercial; Rural & lifestyle; Property management; Body corporate management; Projects
- Owner: The Barfoot & Thompson families
- Number of employees: 2400
- Website: barfoot.co.nz

Barfoot & Thompson is New Zealand's largest privately owned, non-franchised real estate company, based in Auckland, New Zealand. The company is family owned and operated and is still run by the same Barfoot and Thompson families that started the business in the 1920s. The current directors are Peter Thompson (managing director) and Stephen Barfoot, and the chief executive officer is Chris Dobbie.

Barfoot & Thompson has more than 75 branches, over 1,500 salespeople, and specialises in residential, commercial, rural and lifestyle property, body corporate management and projects.

The company has property managers in over 60 branches and a portfolio of more than 17,000 rental properties.

Barfoot & Thompson specialise in the Auckland and Northland markets.

== Company history ==
Barfoot & Thompson was established by Val Barfoot in 1923 out of a tiny Newmarket land agency (purchased for just £75) and was originally called “V. Barfoot Land Agent”.

A year later, Val was joined by his older brother, Kelland, and the name changed to “Barfoot Bros”. In 1934, the Barfoot brothers were joined by Maurice Thompson, and in 1940, the business became “Barfoot & Thompson”, as it is known today.

== Auctions ==
The company has an in-house team of eight auctioneers. Their head office is at 34 Shortland Street, Auckland. It has a custom-built auction room that seats up to 110 people. They also have auction venues on the North Shore of Auckland, South Auckland and in Whangarei. Barfoot & Thompson auctions are also held on-site at properties.

The company does not participate in the practice of ‘vendor bidding’. This is a type of bid made on behalf of the vendor and is usually made by the auctioneer. Barfoot & Thompson auctioneers will not knowingly accept bids that are not from genuine buyers.

== Partnerships ==
Barfoot & Thompson's partner network includes NZ Realtors Network, Leading Real Estate Companies of the World, Realestate.co.nz and HouGarden.
