= Isa Prins =

New Zealand footballer (born 2005)

Personal information
- Date of birth: 12 July 2005 (age 21)
- Place of birth: Upper Hutt, New Zealand
- Position: Forward

Team information
- Current team: Auckland FC
- Number: 21

Youth career
- –2021: Stop Out

Senior career*
Years	Team	Apps	(Gls)
2021–2023	Stop Out	29	(3)
2023–2026	Wellington Olympic	56	(25)
2026–	Auckland FC (OFC)	18	(3)
2026–	Auckland FC Reserves	3	(2)
2026–	Auckland FC	3	(0)
- * Club domestic league appearances and goals as of 7 November 2026

Isa Prins (born 7 December 2005) is a New Zealand professional footballer who plays as a forward for A-League Men club Auckland FC.

== Early career ==
Prins began playing with Stop Out Sports Club in the Capital Premier League, during his time, Stop Out defeated Wellington Olympic 3–2 at Hutt Recreation Ground, with Prins winning a penalty in the match. Following the season, Olympic head coach Rupert Kemeys invited Prins to join the club for its Central and National League campaigns.

== Club career ==
=== Wellington Olympic ===
Prins joined Wellington Olympic ahead of the 2023 season, making four appearances during his first year at the club as Olympic won the Central League and National League titles.

He enjoyed a breakout campaign in the 2024 season, making 26 appearances and scoring nine goals, including a hat-trick in an 8–0 win over Island Bay United, as Olympic once again won the Central League title.

During the 2025 season, Prins again made 26 appearances, scoring 16 goals. This included a four-goal game in a 1–9 win over Waterside Karori. He started in Olympic's Chatham Cup final victory over Auckland United at North Harbour Stadium. Olympic defeated Auckland United 4–2, with Prins scoring once and registering two assists. Despite having a penalty saved in the second half, Prins was awarded the Jack Batty Memorial Cup as player of the match.

=== Auckland FC ===
On 17 December 2025, Prins joined Auckland FC ahead of the club's inaugural OFC Professional League campaign. He made his debut in Auckland's opening match on 17 January 2026, a 3–0 win over South Island United at Eden Park. Prins recorded his first assist for the club in the following match, a 3–1 victory over Vanuatu United.

Prins was later briefly demoted to the Auckland FC Reserves side, where he scored twice in a 3–3 draw with Auckland United in the Northern League. On 21 April, he scored his first goal in the OFC Professional League, sealing a 3–1 win over South Island United at Govind Park. He scored once more against South Island United before facing them again in the semi-finals, scoring the only goal in a 1–0 victory that secured Auckland FC's place in the 2026 OFC Professional League final and qualification for the FIFA Intercontinental Cup.

On 20 July 2026, Prins was promoted to Auckland FC's A-League Men squad on a scholarship contract alongside teammates Bailey Ferguson and Van Fitzharris. Prins made his A-League Men debut on 17 October, coming on as a substitute in a 3–1 win over Melbourne City at Mount Smart Stadium.

== Career statistics ==
As of match played 7 November 2026.

Club	Season	League			Cup (Note: Appearances in Chatham Cup)		Other		Total	
Club	Season	Division	Apps	Goals	Apps	Goals	Apps	Goals	Apps	Goals
Stop Out	2023	Capital Premier	14	3	2	2	—		16	5
Wellington Olympic	2023	National League	4	0	0	0	—		4	0
Wellington Olympic	2024	National League	26	9	6	4	—		32	13
Wellington Olympic	2025	National League	26	16	5	3	—		31	19
Wellington Olympic	Total		56	25	11	7	0	0	63	32
Auckland FC Reserves	2026	National League	3	2	0	0	0	0	3	2
Auckland FC (OFC)	2026	OFC Professional League	18	3	—		—		18	3
Auckland FC	2026–27	A-League Men	3	0	—		—		3	0
Career total			94	33	13	9	0	0	107	42

== Honours ==
Wellington Olympic

- New Zealand National League: 2023
- Central League: 2023, 2024, 2025
- Chatham Cup: 2025

Auckland FC

- OFC Professional League: 2026

Individual

- Central Football Men's Young Player of the Year: 2023, 2025
- Central Football Men's Central League Player of the Year: 2025
- Jack Batty Cup: 2025
- New Zealand National League Team of the Season: 2025
