= James Bayliss =

Australian soccer player

Personal information
- Date of birth: 16 August 2000 (age 26)
- Place of birth: Darwin, Northern Territory, Australia
- Height: 1.80 m (5 ft 11 in)
- Position: Midfielder

Team information
- Current team: Marconi Stallions

Youth career
- Central Coast Mariners

Senior career*
Years	Team	Apps	(Gls)
2019–2023	CCM Academy	50	(6)
2022–2023	Central Coast Mariners	13	(0)
2024–2025	Marconi Stallions	48	(1)
2026	Auckland FC (OFC)	19	(1)
2026–	Marconi Stallions	8	(0)
- * Club domestic league appearances and goals as of 26 August 2026 ‡ National team caps and goals as of 23 January 2022

James Bayliss (born 16 August 2000) is an Australian soccer player who plays as a midfielder for Marconi Stallions in the National Premier Leagues NSW.

== Club career ==
=== Central Coast Mariners ===
Bayliss' professional career begun with the Central Coast Mariners, having originally joined the academy in 2019.

In 2022, Bayliss was part of the Mariners' premiership and promotion winning team in the NSW League One competition (the second tier of the National Premier Leagues NSW system). However, the team lost the Grand Final 2-1 after extra time to St George City.

Bayliss made his A-League debut in 2022. Bayliss was part of the first team squads for the Mariners in the 2021-22 season as well as the Championship winning 2022-23 season, departing shortly afterwards. Bayliss made 13 appearances in the A-League for the club.

=== Marconi Stallions ===
Following his departure from the Central Coast Mariners, Bayliss signed with Marconi Stallions for the 2024 NPL NSW season.

=== Auckland FC (OFC) ===
On 8 January 2026, Bayliss joined Auckland FC's OFC Professional League squad for the 2026 season. He scored his first goal for the club on 3 February in a 4–0 victory over Tahiti United at the PNG Football Stadium. Bayliss was also named OFC Player of the Match for his performance. Following the title-winning 2026 OFC Professional League campaign, Bayliss returned to Marconi Stallions.

== Personal life ==
Bayliss was raised in Darwin, Northern Territory, and has a younger brother, Lachlan Bayliss, who is also a professional footballer. Like his brother, Lachlan had stints at youth level with Newcastle Jets and Central Coast Mariners before making his professional breakthrough with the latter.

== Career statistics ==
=== Club ===
As of match played on 19 July 2026.

Appearances and goals by club, season and competition
Club	Season	League			Cup		Other		Total	
Club	Season	Division	Apps	Goals	Apps	Goals	Apps	Goals	Apps	Goals
Central Coast Mariners	2021–22	A-League Men	6	0	0	0	0	0	6	0
Central Coast Mariners	2022–23	A-League Men	6	0	0	0	0	0	6	0
Central Coast Mariners	Total		12	0	0	0	0	0	12	0
Central Coast Mariners Academy	2022	NSW League One	1	0	—		0	0	1	0
Central Coast Mariners Academy	2023	NPL NSW	16	1	—		—		16	1
Central Coast Mariners Academy	Total		17	1	0	0	0	0	17	1
Marconi Stallions	2024	NPL NSW	9	0	0	0	2 (Note: Appearances in NPL NSW Finals)	0	11	0
Marconi Stallions	2025	NPL NSW	28	1	3	1	11 (Note: 9 appearances in Australian Championship; 2 appearances in NPL NSW Finals)	0	42	2
Marconi Stallions	Total		37	1	3	1	13	0	53	2
Auckland FC (OFC)	2026	OFC Pro League	19	1	—		—		19	1
Marconi Stallions	2026	NPL NSW	3	0	0	0	0	0	3	0
Career total			88	3	3	1	13	0	104	4

== Honours ==
Auckland FC

- OFC Professional League: 2026
