= Oscar Faulds =

Swedish born New Zealand footballer (born 2002)

Personal information
- Full name: Oscar Faulds
- Date of birth: 15 January 2002 (age 24)
- Place of birth: Stockholm, Sweden
- Position: Forward

Team information
- Current team: Auckland FC (OFC)
- Number: 11

Youth career
- –2019: Älvsjö AIK
- 2020–2021: IF Brommapojkarna

Senior career*
Years	Team	Apps	(Gls)
2019	Älvsjö AIK	3	(1)
2020–2021	IF Brommapojkarna	0	(0)
2022	IFK Luleå	17	(8)
2023	Hudiksvalls FF	5	(0)
2023–2024	Storfors AIK	12	(13)
2024	Napier City Rovers	23	(27)
2025	Union Titus Pétange	11	(2)
2025	IF Karlstad	8	(2)
2026	Auckland FC (OFC)	12	(3)
- * Club domestic league appearances and goals as of 15 November 2026

Oscar Faulds (born 15 January 2002) is a professional footballer who last played as a forward for OFC Professional League club Auckland FC.

== Club career ==
=== Early career ===
Faulds played youth football with Älvsjö AIK and IF Brommapojkarna in the P19 Allsvenskan before signing for IFK Luleå in 2022.

=== Napier City Rovers ===
On 29 February 2024, Napier City Rovers announced the signing of Faulds for the 2024 season. Faulds finished the Central League season as the top scorer with 21 goals in 14 appearances.

=== Union Titus Pétange ===
Faulds signed a contract with Union Titus Pétange in February 2025, after trialing with clubs in Denmark and Sweden and Wellington Phoenix. His trials were cut-short due to illness.

=== IF Karlstad ===
On 4 August 2025, Faulds signed for Swedish club IF Karlstad playing in the third tier.

=== Auckland FC ===
On 14 January 2026, Auckland FC announced Faulds had signed a contract with the OFC Pro League side for the inaugural season. Faulds scored Auckland FC's first OFC Pro League goal in their opening game, a 3–0 win over rivals South Island United. This goal meant he was also the first Kiwi to score in the competition.

== Playing style ==
Faulds has been described as a "tall and big forward with good basic technique and a clear picture of why he plays football".

== Personal life ==
Born in Sweden, Faulds holds dual nationality with New Zealand, stating he hopes to one day represent New Zealand internationally.

== Career statistics ==
=== Club ===
As of match played on 15 November 2026.

Appearances and goals by club, season and competition
Club	Season	League			Cup		Others		Total	
Club	Season	Division	Apps	Goals	Apps	Goals	Apps	Goals	Apps	Goals
Napier City Rovers	2024	National League	23	27	4	2	—		27	29
Union Titus Pétange	2024–25	National Division	11	2	0	0	—		11	2
IF Karlstad	2025	Ettan Norra	8	2	1	0	—		9	2
Auckland FC	2026	—			—		8	2	8	2
Career total			50	33	5	2	13	3	59	38

== Honours ==
Individual

- Central League Top scorer: 2024

Auckland FC

- OFC Professional League: 2026
