= Tass Mourdoukoutas =

Australian soccer player (born 1999)

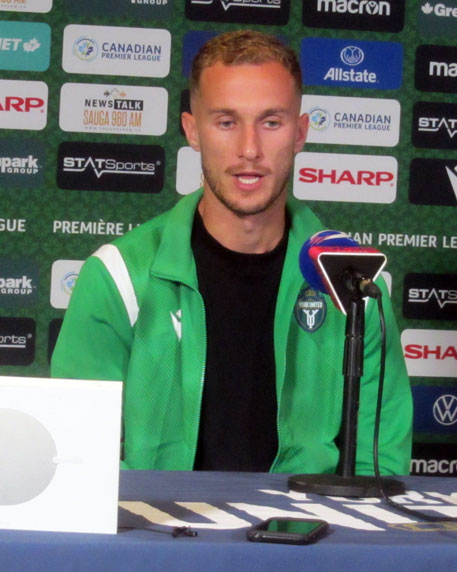
- Mourdoukoutas with York United in 2022

Personal information
- Date of birth: 3 March 1999 (age 27)
- Place of birth: Sydney, Australia
- Height: 1.88 m (6 ft 2 in)
- Position: Central defender

Team information
- Current team: Heidelberg United
- Number: 5

Youth career
- Marrickville FC
- 2014–2015: FNSW NTC
- 2016–2017: Sydney Olympic
- 2017–2022: Western Sydney Wanderers

Senior career*
Years	Team	Apps	(Gls)
2017	Sydney Olympic	15	(0)
2018–2021	Western Sydney Wanderers NPL	21	(3)
2018–2022	Western Sydney Wanderers	40	(2)
2022–2023	York United	36	(0)
2024	Valour FC	25	(0)
2025	Perth Glory	8	(0)
2025	Marconi Stallions	18	(1)
2026	Auckland FC (OFC)	11	(0)
2026	Heidelberg United	9	(0)

International career^{‡}
2018	Australia U19	6	(0)
2019–2020	Australia U23	11	(2)
Medal record
Men's football
Representing Australia
AFC U-23 Asian Cup
Third place	2020 Thailand	U-23 Team
- * Club domestic league appearances and goals as of 1 September 2026 ‡ National team caps and goals as of 26 January 2020

Tass Mourdoukoutas (born 3 March 1999) is an Australian professional soccer player who plays as a defender for Heidelberg United FC in the NPL Victoria and recently was a captain for Auckland FC (OFC) in the OFC Pro League.

== Early life ==
Born in Sydney, Mourdoukoutas grew up in Sylvania Waters and is of Greek descent. He began playing soccer at the age of four with the Marrickville FC Red Devils. Afterwards, he joined the Football NSW Institute before moving to Sydney Olympic's youth team in 2016. In 2017, he joined the Western Sydney Wanderers Academy, where he played for both the club’s National Premier Leagues NSW 2 side and Championship-winning Foxtel Y-League team.

== Club career ==
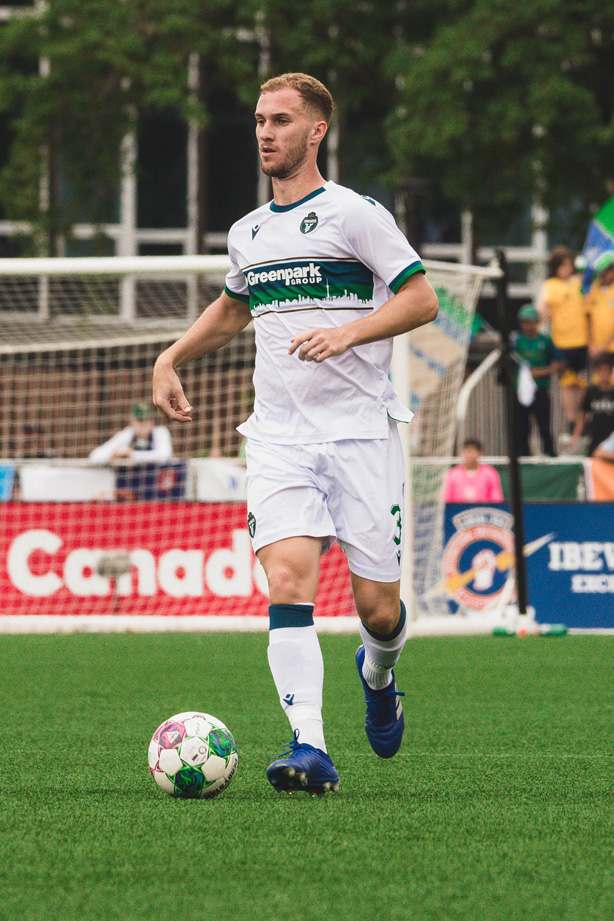
Tass playing for York United in 2024

Mourdoukoutas made his professional debut for Western Sydney Wanderers in a 1–1 draw with Wellington Phoenix on 13 January 2018, coming on for Steven Lustica in the 88th minute. He signed his first professional contract with the Wanderers on 8 June 2018, penning a two-year deal with the club. Mourdoukoutas scored his first professional goal in a Round 15 clash with Melbourne City on 23 January 2019, scoring the Wanderers' second as they went on to lose 4–3. In February 2020, he signed a three-year extension with the club. On 16 June 2022, it was announced that he would be departing the club, as he sought out an opportunity for increased gametime.

In June 2022, Mourdoukoutas signed with Canadian Premier League side York United through 2023. He made his debut for York on July 8, against Forge FC. He departed the club after the 2023 season.

In December 2023, he signed with Valour FC for the 2024 season. He departed the club after the 2024 season.

In January 2025, Mourdoukoutas returned to Australia and joined A-League club Perth Glory for the remainder of the 2024–25 season. He departed the club at the conclusion of his contract at the end of June 2025, and immediately joined the Marconi Stallions in the second-tier NPL Men's NSW.

On 11 December 2025, Mourdoukoutas joined Auckland FC (OFC) as one of the first five signings for the OFC Pro League. On 14 January 2026, Mourdoukoutas was announced as the inaugural captain for the OFC squad.

== International career ==
In August 2018, he was named to the Australia U19 team for the 2018 AFC U-19 Championship.

In 2019, he played with the Australia U23 at the 2020 AFC U-23 Championship qualification tournament and later at the 2020 AFC U-23 Championship, helping Australia to a third place finish to qualify for the Olympics, although Mourdoukoutas was not selected for the Olympic squad.

== Career statistics ==
As of 19 October 2024

Club	Season	League			Playoffs (Note: Includes other competitive competitions such as NPL Playoff Finals and CPL Playoffs.)		Domestic Cup (Note: Includes FFA Cup and Canadian Championship)		Continental		Total	
Club	Season	League	Apps	Goals	Apps	Goals	Apps	Goals	Apps	Goals	Apps	Goals
Sydney Olympic	2017	NPL NSW 1	14	0	1	0	?	?	—		15	0
Western Sydney Wanderers NPL	2018	NPL NSW 2	13	2	—		—		—		13	2
Western Sydney Wanderers NPL	2019	NPL NSW 2	1	0	—		—		—		1	0
Western Sydney Wanderers NPL	2020	NPL NSW 1	5	1	—		—		—		5	1
Western Sydney Wanderers NPL	2021	NPL NSW 2	2	0	—		—		—		2	0
Western Sydney Wanderers NPL	Total		21	3	0	0	0	0	0	0	21	3
Western Sydney Wanderers	2017–18	A-League	1	0	—		0	0	—		1	0
Western Sydney Wanderers	2018–19	A-League	10	1	—		1	0	—		11	1
Western Sydney Wanderers	2019–20	A-League	10	1	—		3	0	—		13	1
Western Sydney Wanderers	2020–21	A-League	13	0	—		1	1	—		14	1
Western Sydney Wanderers	2021–22	A-League	6	0	—		1	0	—		7	0
Western Sydney Wanderers	Total		40	2	0	0	6	1	0	0	46	3
York United	2022	Canadian Premier League	15	0	—		0	0	—		15	0
York United	2023	Canadian Premier League	21	0	1	0	1	0	—		23	0
York United	Total		36	0	1	0	1	0	0	0	38	0
Valour FC	2024	Canadian Premier League	25	0	—		0	0	—		25	0
Auckland FC (OFC)	2026	OFC Professional League	0	0	—		—		—		0	0
Career totals			135	5	2	0	7	1	–	–	145	6

== Honours ==
Western Sydney Wanderers

- Y-League: 2017–18

Auckland FC (OFC)

- OFC Professional League: 2026

Australia U-23

- AFC U-23 Asian Cup: 3rd place 2020
