= Aidan Carey =

New Zealand association footballer (born 2001)

Personal information
- Full name: Aidan Paul Uea Carey
- Date of birth: 10 July 2001 (age 25)
- Place of birth: New Zealand
- Height: 1.88 m (6 ft 2 in)
- Positions: Defender; midfielder

Youth career
- Bay Olympic
- 2015–2018: Central United
- 2018–2020: Auckland City

Senior career*
Years	Team	Apps	(Gls)
2020–2023	Auckland City	49	(2)
2023–2026	Western Springs	55	(5)
2026	Auckland FC (OFC)	8	(0)
- * Club domestic league appearances and goals as of 18 March 2026

Aidan Paul Uea Carey (born 10 July 2001) is a New Zealand professional association footballer who last played as a defender and midfielder for OFC Professional League side Auckland FC.

== Club career ==
Carey played youth football in Auckland for both Bay Olympic and Central United. He made his club debut for Auckland City, where he won OFC Champions League titles and was included in both their 2022 and 2023 FIFA Club World Cup squads. In 2024, he signed for Western Springs, and was later included in the 2025 New Zealand National League Team of the Season.

In January 2026, he signed for Auckland FC's OFC Professional League team, making his debut against South Island United, where he played against fellow Niuean citizen Jaylen Rodwell.

== International career ==
In August 2023, Carey was called up to New Zealand's under-23 national team for the 2023 OFC Men's Olympic Qualifying Tournament, but did not make an appearance.

== Personal life ==
Born in New Zealand, Carey is of Niuean descent, and holds both New Zealand and Niuean citizenship.

== Career statistics ==
=== Club ===
As of match played on 18 March 2026.

Appearances and goals by club, season and competition
Club	Season	League			Cup		Continental		Other		Total	
Club	Season	Division	Apps	Goals	Apps	Goals	Apps	Goals	Apps	Goals	Apps	Goals
Auckland City	2020–21	Premiership	4	0	—		—		0	0	4	0
Auckland City	2021	National League	13	1	0	0	—		—		13	1
Auckland City	2022	National League	22	1	4	0	5 (Note: Appearance(s) in OFC Champions League)	0	—		31	1
Auckland City	2023	National League	10	0	2	0	1	0	0	0	13	0
Auckland City	Total		49	2	6	0	6	0	0	0	61	2
Western Springs	2024	National League	29	3	3	0	—		—		32	3
Western Springs	2025	National League	26	2	1	0	—		—		27	2
Western Springs	Total		55	5	4	0	0	0	0	0	59	5
Auckland FC	2026	—			—		8	0	—		8	0
Career total			112	7	10	0	6	0	0	0	128	7
