= Bailey Ferguson =

Australian footballer (born 2007)

Personal information
- Full name: Bailey Ferguson
- Date of birth: 28 October 2007 (age 18)
- Height: 1.88 m (6 ft 2 in)
- Position: Forward

Youth career
- –2017: Olympic FC
- –2019: Gold Coast United
- 2020–2022: Brisbane Roar
- –2023: Logan Metro

Senior career*
Years	Team	Apps	(Gls)
2023–2026	Eastern Suburbs FC	41	(7)
2026	Auckland FC (OFC)	6	(3)
2026	Auckland FC	2	(0)
2026	Auckland FC Reserves	1	(0)

International career^{‡}
2026–	New Zealand U-20	3	(4)
- * Club domestic league appearances and goals as of 6 June 2026 ‡ National team caps and goals as of 8 September 2026

Bailey Ferguson (born 28 October 2007) an Australian professional footballer who plays as a forward. He most recently played for Auckland FC in the OFC Professional League.

== Early life ==
Ferguson began his career in Australia, playing his youth football at Olympic FC. Ferguson moved to Gold Coast United before joining the Brisbane Roar academy at under-13 level in 2020. In 2023, Ferguson played for Logan Metro, featuring in the club's Australia Cup preliminary round campaign. He scored a hat-trick in a 7–1 victory over Nerang Eagles on 18 February 2023.

== Club career ==
=== Eastern Suburbs ===
Ferguson played senior football for Eastern Suburbs in the Queensland Premier League from 2023. He enjoyed his most prolific campaign in 2025, scoring seven goals and providing four assists in the NPL Queensland, and was subsequently named Football Queensland NPL Young Player of the Year.

=== Auckland FC ===
On 10 December 2025, Ferguson was announced as one of Auckland FC’s first five signings ahead of the club’s inaugural OFC Professional League campaign. On 17 January 2026, he came off the bench in Auckland FC’s first OFC Professional League match, scoring in a 3–0 win over South Island United. Ferguson later scored in consecutive matches, netting in a 2–0 win over PNG Hekari, and a 4–0 victory against Tahiti United. His performances in the OFC Professional League earned him inclusion in Auckland FC’s A-League Men squad as a replacement for suspended striker Sam Cosgrove. Ferguson made his A-League debut in the New Zealand derby, a 5–0 win over Wellington Phoenix.

On 20 July 2026, Ferguson was promoted to Auckland FC's A-League Men squad on a scholarship contract alongside teammates Isa Prins and Van Fitzharris. On 21 August, Ferguson was named in the New Zealand U-19 men’s squad for the 2026 OFC U-19 Championship, but was listed as Unattached. It was then reported that he had returned to Australia to be closer with family in a statement by Terry McFlynn.

== Career statistics ==
=== Club ===
As of match played on 20 July 2026.

Appearances and goals by club, season and competition
Club	Season	League			Cup		Continental		Total	
Club	Season	Division	Apps	Goals	Apps	Goals	Apps	Goals	Apps	Goals
Eastern Suburbs FC	2023	NPL Queensland	4	0	0	0	0	0	4	0
Eastern Suburbs FC	2024	Queensland Premier League	15	0	0	0	—		15	0
Eastern Suburbs FC	2025	NPL Queensland	22	7	0	0	0	0	22	7
Eastern Suburbs FC	Total		41	7	0	0	0	0	41	7
Auckland FC Reserves	2026	Northern League	1	0	0	0	0	0	1	0
Auckland FC	2025–26	A-League Men	2	0	0	0	6 (Note: Appearances in OFC Professional League)	3	8	3
Career total			49	10	0	0	0	0	49	10

== Honours ==
Auckland FC

- A-League Men Championship: 2026
- OFC Professional League: 2026

Individual

- NPL Queensland Young Player of the Year: 2025
