= Luke Casserly =

Australian soccer player

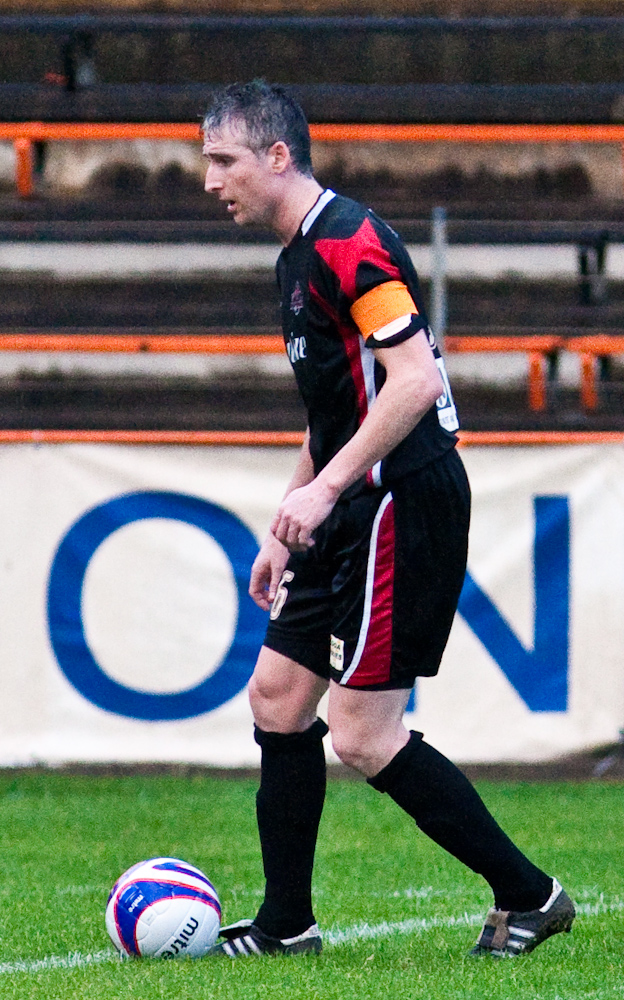

Personal information
- Full name: Luke Anthony Casserly
- Date of birth: 11 December 1973 (age 52)
- Place of birth: Sydney, Australia
- Height: 1.85 m (6 ft 1 in)
- Position: Defender

Team information
- Current team: Auckland FC (assistant coach); Auckland FC (OFC) (head coach)

Youth career
- 1980–1982: Colo Cougars
- 1983–1984: Nepean Association
- 1985–1986: Blacktown City
- 1987–1991: Marconi

Senior career*
Years	Team	Apps	(Gls)
1992–1998	Marconi	132	(2)
1998–2000	Northern Spirit	43	(2)
2000–2002	AIK	52	(1)
2002–2005	Marconi	29	(0)
2005	Stanmore Hawks		
2006–2008	Marconi		
2009	Blacktown City		
2010	Manly United		

International career^{‡}
1993	Australia U-20		
1996	Australia U-23		
1997–2001	Australia	8	(0)

Managerial career
- 2011–2012: Marconi Stallions
- 2025: Auckland FC Reserves
- 2026–: Auckland FC (OFC)
Medal record
Representing Australia
Men's Association football
AFC–OFC Challenge Cup
Runner-up	2001 Japan
- * Club domestic league appearances and goals as of 17:01, 16 May 2009 (UTC) ‡ National team caps and goals as of 17:01, 16 May 2009 (UTC)

Luke Casserly (born 11 December 1973) is a former Australian international footballer. He is currently head coach of Auckland FC (OFC) as well as holding the position of assistant coach with the first-team.

== Biography ==
Casserly was born in Sydney and attended St. Dominic's College in Kingswood. Casserly made his senior debut for Marconi in the National Soccer League as a 17-year-old, and quickly established himself as an integral part of the first-team squad winning the National Soccer League championship in 1992/93. An enterprising wing back, Casserly spent seven seasons with Marconi, earning International honours at Under 20 and Under 23 level, and ultimately making his full senior debut under Terry Venables against New Zealand in 1997.

He was lured to Northern Spirit in 1998, the newly formed National Soccer League franchise based in North Sydney. After two impressive seasons there, and in the prime of his career at 26, he moved to Sweden, signing with AIK. His progress at the Swedish club was steady, and he finally secured a regular starting position in his third season with the club, playing 30 out of a possible 36 matches. However, he failed to negotiate an improved contract, and returned to Australia, playing out the final seasons of the now defunct NSL with Marconi.

Despite the dawn of the A-League, Casserly elected to pursue more lucrative career interests outside of football, and continued to play football at the NSW Premier League level, where his clubs have included Marconi, Stanmore Hawks, Blacktown City and Manly United. The 2010 NSWPL season was Casserly's last as a player and he became head Coach of Marconi Stallions in 2011. After an average year in his first year as coach, Casserly managed to bring championship success to Marconi in 2012 winning the grand final match against Bonnyrigg White Eagles 2–0. This was Marconi's first championship victory since the 1992/93 NSL season. Casserly was part of that team as a player and has now become one of a rare few that have won titles with a club as both player and coach.

In 2013, Casserly was appointed as head of national performance of the Football Federation Australia.

In February 2025, Casserly was appointed head coach of Auckland FC Reserves, while also supporting the first team as an assistant coach. Casserly guided the Reserves to ninth place in their inaugural Northern League season, they automatically qualified for the 2025 National League due to A-League Men requirements, and went on to finish fourth.

On 1 December 2025, Casserly was appointed head coach of the newly established Auckland FC (OFC) team in the OFC Pro League.

== Managerial statistics ==
As of as at 24 May 2026

Managerial record by team and tenure
Team	Nat	From	To	Record							
Team	Nat	From	To	G	W	D	L	GF	GA	GD	Win %
Auckland FC Reserves	(New Zealand)	10 February 2025	7 December 2025	33	11	9	13	51	48	+3	33.33
Auckland FC (OFC)	(New Zealand)	1 December 2025	Present	18	13	2	3	34	14	+20	72.22
Total				51	24	11	16	85	62	+23	47.06

== Honours ==
Marconi Stallions

- NSL Champions: 1992–93
- NSL Minor Premiership: 1995–96
- NSL Championship Runners-up: 1995–96
- NSWPL Champions: 2012

Hills United

- NSW League 1 Champions: 2023

Auckland FC

- A-League Premiership: 2024–25
- OFC Professional League: 2026

Australia

- AFC–OFC Challenge Cup: runner-up 2001
