= Bill Foley (businessman) =

American businessperson (born 1944)

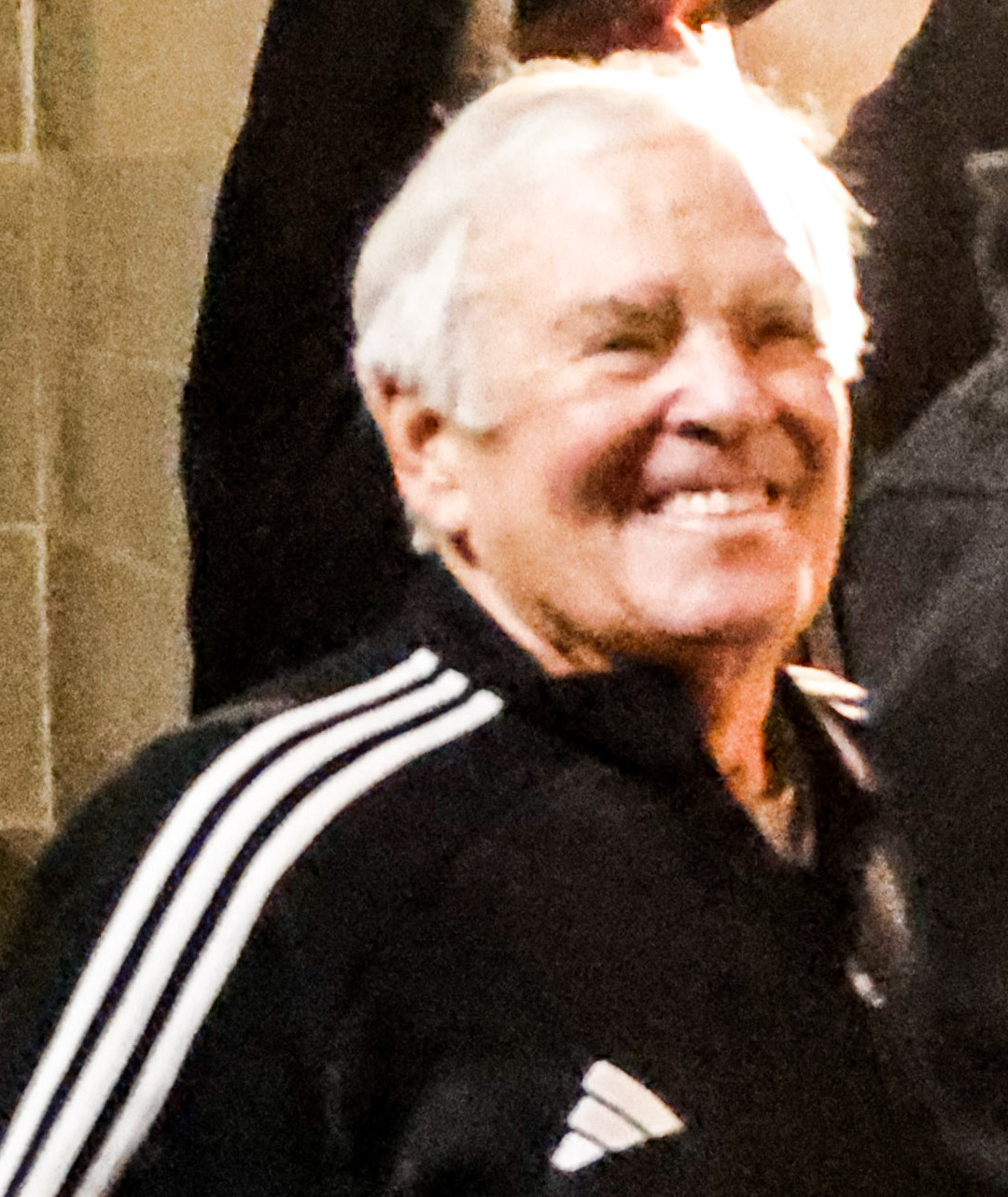
- Foley at the United States Military Academy in 2024
- Born: William Patrick Foley II; December 29, 1944 (age 81); Austin, Texas, U.S.
- Education: United States Military Academy (B.S.); University of Washington School of Law (J.D.)
- Occupations: Financial services Professional sports owner
- Known for: Fidelity National Financial chairman Foley Family Wines founder Foley Entertainment Group chairman Vegas Golden Knights owner
- Spouse: Carol Johnson (m. 1969)
- Children: 4
- Awards: 2023 Stanley Cup champion

William Patrick Foley II (born December 29, 1944) is an American businessman and former attorney, specializing in financial services. He is chairman of Fidelity National Financial, Cannae Holdings and Black Knight Financial Services. Foley is the lead investor, chairman, and CEO of Black Knight Sports & Entertainment, a consortium that owns the Vegas Golden Knights. He is the owner of Indoor Football League team Vegas Knight Hawks. He is managing general partner of Black Knight Football Club, which owns multiple association football clubs; Premier League club Bournemouth, A-League club Auckland FC, Primeira Liga club Moreirense and Ligue 1 club Lorient. As of 2023, he had an estimated net worth of US$1.6 billion according to Forbes.

== Background ==
Growing up, Foley mostly lived in Texas with his family and extended family, who were ranchers. For a time, he lived in Ottawa, Ontario, when his father was posted in the United States Air Force there. Foley played shinny, an informal type of ice hockey, and started a lifelong appreciation for the sport.

Foley attended the United States Military Academy in West Point, New York. While a cadet, he made $40,000 on the stock market, which he invested in during his spare time. Upon graduating from West Point, Foley was commissioned as a Second Lieutenant in the Air Force, where during his career he negotiated million-dollar defense contracts with Boeing. After leaving the Air Force, Foley earned his J.D. from the University of Washington in 1974 and moved into corporate law. Later, he bought and revitalized the then-struggling title insurance firm Fidelity National Financial. He would go on to invest in over 20 wineries in California, the Pacific Northwest, New Zealand and Argentina, as well as golf courses, hotels, ski resorts, steakhouses, fast-food restaurants and auto parts manufacturers, many under the ownership of Foley Entertainment Group, which he founded in 2021.

== Sports ownership ==
While Foley was living in Jacksonville, Florida, he explored buying the National Football League's Jacksonville Jaguars, before the team was acquired by Shahid Khan.

In late 2006, Foley became the majority shareholder of Winter Sports, Inc. (WSI), the operator of Whitefish Mountain Resort, in Whitefish, Montana. Foley's takeover of WSI occurred through a series of two reverse stock splits that took WSI from a publicly traded company, with many shareholders living in the local Flathead Valley, to a private S corp. Foley was able to purchase 27% of the outstanding WSI shares in the early 2000s from Richard A. Dasen, a local shareholder who went to prison for 14 prostitution-related crimes.

In June 2016, Foley and Black Knight Sports & Entertainment was awarded a National Hockey League expansion franchise that became the Vegas Golden Knights. The Golden Knights began play in the 2017–18 season at the new T-Mobile Arena, and also acquired a minority ownership of the facility. Foley pledged to win a Stanley Cup in six seasons, and the Golden Knights made good on that promise in 2023. In 2020, Black Knight Sports & Entertainment purchased an American Hockey League franchise to act as a development team for the Golden Knights, relocating the San Antonio Rampage to become the Henderson Silver Knights. The Silver Knights played out of the Orleans Arena until the Dollar Loan Center, which is operated by Black Knight Sports & Entertainment, was completed in 2022.

In 2021, Foley announced Black Knight Sports & Entertainment had purchased an expansion team in the Indoor Football League to begin play in 2022 at the Dollar Loan Center in Henderson, Nevada. On August 23, 2021, the team unveiled their name and logo as the Vegas Knight Hawks.

On December 13, 2022, a group of investors led by Foley completed a deal to purchase English football club AFC Bournemouth, with Foley assuming the role of chairman. Ahead of the deal, he was present at one of Bournemouth's Premier League matches against Leicester City, with the Cherries winning 2–1. On January 13, 2023, Foley acquired a significant minority stake in French football club Lorient, creating a partnership with Bournemouth.

On October 11, 2023, the Australian Professional Leagues (APL) announced Foley as the preferred bidder to be the owner of a new A-Leagues expansion club, based in Auckland, New Zealand. The APL officially confirmed the new team would be awarded a licence under Foley's ownership on November 21, with the Auckland FC men's team being introduced for the 2024–25 A-League Men season and the women's team competing from 2025–26 onwards.

At an AGM held in February 2024, Black Knight ratified a deal to become a significant minority shareholder in Scottish football club Hibernian. Black Knight acquired 25% of Hibs for a £6 million investment and Foley was appointed to the club's board of directors soon afterwards, but the stake was sold to the majority shareholders in November 2025, with "philosophical differences" cited for the partnership breaking down.

As of April 2026, Bill Foley was reported to be in advanced negotiations to acquire Exeter Chiefs.

In June 2026, he announced a bid to acquire an NBA franchise in Las Vegas. In September 2026, Foley and Jerry Colangelo are narrowed down to three group finalist, along with Bill and Nancy Walton Laurie; and a joint bid by Steve Apostolopoulos and Marc Lasry.

== Personal life ==
Since 1969, Foley has been married to Carol Johnson, a former flight attendant for United Airlines, with whom he has four children. His wife and daughters are all involved in the family winery, while his son is the chief business officer of the Vegas Golden Knights. His other son, who was also a part of the winemaking business, died at the age of 31 in August 2018, as a result of a traumatic head injury.

Foley is a financial supporter of President Donald Trump.

== Awards and honors ==
- 2023 Stanley Cup champion - as owner of the Vegas Golden Knights
