= Auckland FC =

Auckland
- Full name: Auckland Football Club
- Nickname: The Black Knights
- Short name: AFC
- Founded: 14 March 2024; 2 years ago
- Ground: Go Media Stadium
- Capacity: 25,000
- Coordinates: 36.8402°S 174.7650°E
- Owner(s): Black Knight Sports and Entertainment group
- Chairman: Bill Foley
- Head coach: Pedro Moreira
- League: A-League Men
- 2025–26: 3rd of 12; Finals: Champions
- Website: aucklandfc.co.nz
Home colours	Away colours

Auckland Football Club, commonly known as Auckland FC, is a professional football club based in Auckland, New Zealand that competes in the A-League, the top flight of Australian soccer and the OFC Professional League. They became both the A-League and the OFC Professional League champions for the 2025–26 season.

Established on 14 March 2024, the club is under license from the APL. The club's home ground is the Mount Smart Stadium, currently known as the Go Media Stadium for sponsorship reasons, in Penrose. Auckland was given an A-League license under its chosen owner Bill Foley in November 2023, as part of the third tranche competition expansion. The club achieved early success by claiming the Premiership in the 2024–25 regular season, and the Championship in 2026, becoming only the second expansion side to win the former in their debut season, after Western Sydney Wanderers in the regular 2012–13 season.

== History ==
=== Formation ===
In March 2023, the Australian Professional Leagues confirmed plans for the next two expansion clubs to be based in Canberra and Auckland ahead of the 2024–25 season. In October 2023, the preferred bidder as owner of the new Auckland license was confirmed to be Bill Foley, with the license officially awarded on 21 November. Speaking at the time of the license awarding in November 2023, Foley stated there "was a lot of work to do" to determine the name and logo for the club and that he was "not wedded to any name at this point", despite expressing a personal preference for "Black Knights".

On 14 March 2024, the club officially announced its name, logo and inaugural home kit at its headquarters in Auckland. The kit (manufactured by New Balance) featured electric blue and black vertical stripes as its main features. The nickname was unveiled to be "Black Knights", which is associated with several clubs that Foley owns and refers to the nickname of the sports teams at his alma mater, the United States Military Academy. Terry McFlynn was chosen as the inaugural director of football, and Steve Corica as head coach. Auckland announced their first player signings in May 2024, ahead of the 2024–25 season.

=== Debut seasons and early success ===

2026 A–League Grand Final Starting XI

On 19 October 2024, Auckland played their inaugural A-League Men's fixture at the Mount Smart Stadium against Brisbane Roar. In front of, a sell-out crowd of 24,492, the club secured a 2–0 win. Auckland would then go on to win their next 5 games and go undefeated for their first seven league matches. One of these wins was in the first New Zealand derby at Sky Stadium against Wellington Phoenix, thanks to a late brace from Jake Brimmer. Auckland finished the 2024–25 season as A-League Men Premiers, becoming the first New Zealand-based club to win A-League silverware. Auckland did not qualify for the 2025–26 AFC Champions League Elite competition, as the team is based in New Zealand and is a member of the Oceania Football Confederation (OFC). In their first finals series, Auckland won 1–0 at AAMI Park against Melbourne Victory, but later lost 2–0 (2–1 on aggregate) in front of a record crowd of 29,148 at Mount Smart Stadium.

Following the abrupt end to their inaugural season, Auckland set their eyes on becoming the first New Zealand based club to win the A-League Championship. Their season began with a deep run into the Australia Cup, reaching the Semi-finals before a shock 2-0 defeat against Heidelberg United ended their run. In the league, Auckland had six wins in nine matches to open their season before struggling to put together consistent form throughout the rest of it, which saw them win just one of six matches in January, and fail to win any of their last five regular season matches. A 2–2 draw with Sydney FC in their last match saw Auckland drop to third place in the regular season table, placing them in their first Elimination-Final match, a 1–1 draw (7–6 win on penalties) against Melbourne City. Auckland faced Adelaide United over two legs in the semi-finals, a 1–1 draw at home followed by a 3–0 win away to win the tie 4–1 on aggregate saw Auckland FC qualify for their first ever A-League Grand Final, to be played at home against 6th place Sydney FC. In front of a sellout crowd of 28,374, Auckland FC defeated Sydney FC 1–0 thanks to a deflected Cameron Howieson volley to make Auckland the first ever New Zealand based club to win the Championship. To cap off their season, one day after winning the Championship, Auckland FC defeated South Melbourne FC in the inaugural OFC Professional League final to be crowned Champions of Oceania.

== Club badge and colours ==
The club colours are blue and black, associated with the traditional royal blue of Auckland. The crest features an A in its centre to symbolise the city, representing Rangitoto Island and the Sky Tower. The black knight visor and stripes represent the club's owner Black Knight Sports & Entertainment. The club's short name AFC is displayed on the crest.

== Sponsorship ==
Period	Kit supplier	Shirt sponsor (chest)	Shirt sponsor (sleeve)	Shirt sponsor (back)	Short sponsor (front)	Short sponsor (back)
2024–2025	New Balance	Anchor / Go Media	McDonald's / Alvarium	ANZ / Liberty	Cupra	Barfoot & Thompson / Ebury
2025–2026	New Balance	ANZ	McDonald's / Alvarium	Anchor / Liberty	Bargain Chemist	Barfoot & Thompson / AIPC
2026–2027	New Balance	ANZ	McDonald's / Alvarium	Anchor / Liberty	Bargain Chemist	Barfoot & Thompson / BlackBull

== Stadium ==
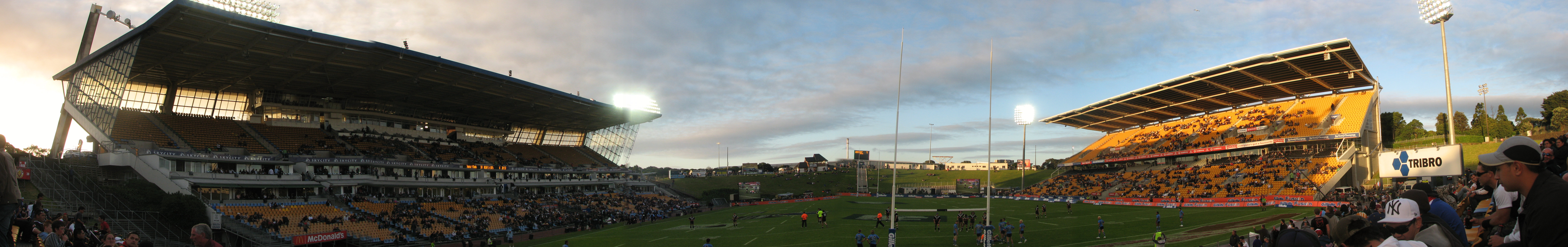
Go Media Stadium, current home ground of Auckland FC

Auckland play their home matches at the Mount Smart Stadium, currently known as the Go Media Stadium due to sponsorship reasons, a 17,500-seat capacity venue located in the suburb of Penrose, approximately 10 kilometers south of Auckland's city centre. The club's owner, Bill Foley, has stated that the ground will be used for a "few years" before a new 20,000-seat stadium is developed on the Auckland waterfront. Due to scheduling conflicts with National Rugby League side New Zealand Warriors, the club uses the North Harbour Stadium as its training ground.

Before the establishment of the club, Wellington Phoenix held matches as the home side in Auckland, playing matches at North Harbour Stadium and Eden Park. The club played their last match in Auckland on 16 March 2024 against Sydney FC at Eden Park. Football Kingz, the first Auckland club to play in Australia, also named North Harbour Stadium and Mount Smart Stadium as their home grounds before dissolving in 2004 due to financial reasons. The New Zealand Knights replaced Football Kingz in the 2005–06 season of the A-League and also played at North Harbour. The Knights folded in the 2006–07 A-League season after the club's license was removed from the Football Federation Australia (FFA) due to insolvency.

On 20 March 2025 it was confirmed Auckland FC were pursuing a stadium development at Western Springs Stadium. Plans include a new 12,500-15,000 seat, stadium, community sports facilities, hospitality and medical services. In early July 2025 Auckland FC scrapped their bid for a stadium at Western Springs Stadium and instead announced their intention to extend their deal with Go Media Stadium and North Harbour Stadium.

== Supporters and rivalries ==
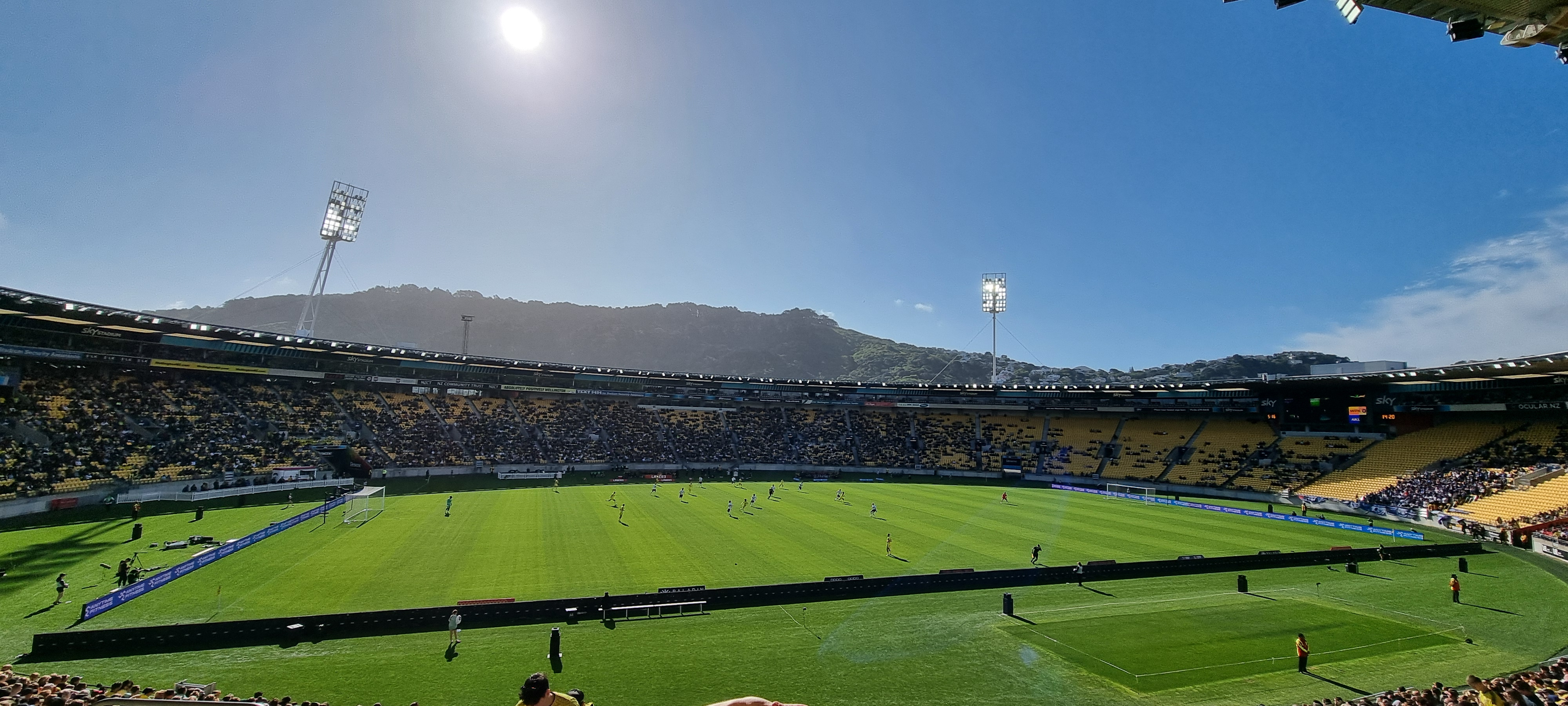
First New Zealand derby match between Wellington Phoenix and Auckland FC at Sky Stadium, Wellington on 2 November 2024.

The Port are an independent supporters' group associated with Auckland FC. The club also have a supporters' pub located at Tyler Street Sport, a bar in the Auckland CBD.

As the third Auckland-based club to compete in the top flight of Australia, succeeding from Football Kingz and New Zealand Knights, Auckland share a rivalry with Wellington Phoenix, who have been the only New Zealand club in the A-League Men since the 2007–08 season. The rivalry has quickly blossomed, due to the inter-city rivalry already established and especially since the controversial signing of former Phoenix goalkeeper Alex Paulsen on loan from AFC Bournemouth also owned by Auckland FC owner Bill Foley. Despite the disparity in on-field performance in the matches between the two clubs and their respective seasons, all three matches between the two rivals were highly attended by A-League standards, all having crowds of over 26,000, and each successive match breaking the previous domestic regular-season record in New Zealand.

Auckland FC became the first team in A-League history to go undefeated in rivalry matches in a single season, winning all three fixtures during the 2024–25 campaign, including the club’s biggest win, a 6–1 victory on 22 February 2025.

In the 2025–26 season, during their third meeting of the campaign (sixth overall), Auckland FC defeated Wellington Phoenix 5–0, extending their unbeaten run against their rivals. Following the match, Wellington Phoenix head coach Giancarlo Italiano resigned, having failed to record a win against Auckland FC, with an aggregate score of 20–4 across the six meetings.

== Ownership ==
The owner of Auckland, Bill Foley, is a businessman and general partner of Black Knight Football Club. Under Black Knight, Foley also owns Premier League side AFC Bournemouth and the Vegas Golden Knights of the National Hockey League in the United States. He holds a minor stake in Ligue 1 club FC Lorient and a majority stake in Primeira Liga club Moreirense.

After the unveiling of Auckland FC on 14 March 2024, Ali Williams and his wife, Anna Mowbray, co-founder of Zuru, were announced as co-owners of the club. Williams is a former professional rugby union player and represented the New Zealand national team as a lock. In June 2024, Tim Bezbatchenko was appointed president of Black Knight.

== Club officials ==
=== Technical staff ===
Position	Name	Ref.
Head coach	(Portugal) Pedro Moreira	
Assistant coach	(Australia) Luke Casserly	
Head Analyst	(Portugal) Rafael Moreira	
Goalkeeping coach	(Australia) Danny Milosevic	
Head of recruitment	(Australia) Doug Kors	
Team manager	(New Zealand) Cam Kilgour	
Head of performance	(Australia) Nathan Sherlock	

=== Management ===
Position	Name	Ref.
Chairman	(United States) Bill Foley	
Chief Executive Officer	(New Zealand) Nick Becker	
Chief Commercial Officer	(New Zealand) Mike Higgins	
Head of football	(Northern Ireland) Terry McFlynn	
Head of consumer business	(New Zealand) Rafael Turnbull	

=== Captaincy history ===
Dates	Name	Honours (as captain)
2024–	(Japan) Hiroki Sakai	Inaugural club captain

== Other Football Departments ==
=== OFC Pro League Team ===
Auckland FC fielded a separate restricted squad in the OFC Professional League. On 29 October 2025, Auckland FC was confirmed as one of eight clubs selected to compete in the inaugural OFC Professional League season, with Luke Casserly announced as the club's coach on 1 December. The competition commenced in January 2026.

The club played its first competitive match on 17 January, defeating South Island United FC 3–0 at Eden Park in the first North vs South Derby. Oscar Faulds scored the club's first ever OFC Professional League goal, while Bailey Ferguson and Liam Gillion also scored in the inaugural victory. On 24 May 2026, Auckland FC were crowned the OFC Professional League champions following a 2–1 win over South Melbourne at Eden Park.

==== Seasonal results (OFC) ====
Season	OFC Professional League								Position	Playoff	Finals	Top goalscorer(s)	
Season	Pld	W	L	D	GF	GA	GD	Pts	Position	Playoff	Finals	Name(s)	Goals
2026	14	10	2	2	26	10	+16	32	1st	2nd	1st	(Argentina) Emiliano Tade & (New Zealand) Liam Gillion	5
2027	0	0	0	0	0	0	0	0	TBD	TBD	TBD		

=== Auckland FC Reserves ===
The men's reserve side competes in the Northern League. The reserve team also receives automatic qualification to the National League in accordance with A-League Men requirements. The side is coached by Rory Fallon, while director of football Terry McFlynn oversees player and coaching recruitment.

=== Women's team ===
A women's team was announced in March 2024 and was set to join the A-League Women for the 2025–26 season, however in August 2025 its entry was postponed until the 2027–28 season.

On 11 May 2026, it was announced that as a part of the New Zealand International Football Festival, an Auckland FC Women's invitational XI would face eight time WSL champions Chelsea Women at Eden Park on 8 August 2026. Former Football Ferns Goalkeeper Jenny Bindon was announced as the head coach of the Auckland Invitational; XI for the fixture, also deciding the squad selection. The match ended 7–0 in favor of Chelsea

== Players ==
=== First-team squad ===
As of 21 August 2026

Note: Flags indicate national team as defined under FIFA eligibility rules; some limited exceptions apply. Players may hold more than one non-FIFA nationality.

No.	Pos.	Nation	Player
1	GK	NZL	Michael Woud
2	DF	JPN	Hiroki Sakai (captain)
4	DF	NZL	Nando Pijnaker
7	MF	NZL	Cameron Howieson
8	MF	CHI	Luis Felipe Gallegos
9	FW	ENG	Sam Cosgrove
10	MF	NZL	Lachlan Bayliss
15	DF	NZL	Francis de Vries
16	MF	NOR	Daniel Normann
17	DF	NZL	Callan Elliot
18	MF	NZL	Marley Leuluai (scholarship)
19	MF	NZL	Oliver Middleton

No.	Pos.	Nation	Player
20	GK	NZL	Oliver Sail
21	FW	NZL	Isa Prins (scholarship)
22	MF	MLT	Jake Brimmer (vice-captain)
23	DF	NZL	Ronan Wynne
24	FW	NZL	Aaron Cartwright (scholarship)
25	DF	NZL	Luka Vicelich (scholarship)
27	FW	NZL	Logan Rogerson
28	DF	AUS	Aaron Calver
30	GK	NZL	Joseph Knowles (scholarship)
35	FW	NZL	Jonty Bidois
57	FW	NZL	Van Fitzharris (scholarship)
77	FW	AUS	Lachlan Brook

=== Other players with first-team appearances ===
Note: Flags indicate national team as defined under FIFA eligibility rules; some limited exceptions apply. Players may hold more than one non-FIFA nationality.

No.	Pos.	Nation	Player
45	DF	NZL	Matthew D'Hotman
46	MF	NZL	James Mitchell

No.	Pos.	Nation	Player
50	GK	NZL	Eli Jones

=== OFC Professional League squad ===
As of 5 June 2026

Note: Flags indicate national team as defined under FIFA eligibility rules; some limited exceptions apply. Players may hold more than one non-FIFA nationality.

No.	Pos.	Nation	Player
1	GK	NZL	Oscar Mason
2	MF	NZL	Aidan Carey
3	DF	AUS	Tass Mourdoukoutas (captain)
5	DF	NZL	Michael den Heijer
6	MF	NOR	Daniel Normann
7	DF	USA	Jonathan Robinson
8	MF	AUS	James Bayliss
11	FW	SWE	Oscar Faulds
12	MF	NZL	Isa Prins
13	DF	NZL	Nathan Lobo
14	FW	NZL	Liam Gillion (first team)
17	MF	NZL	Reid Drake

No.	Pos.	Nation	Player
21	FW	NZL	Matt Ellis
23	DF	NZL	Ronan Wynne
24	DF	NZL	Zac Zoricich
25	DF	NZL	Luka Vicelich (first team)
28	FW	AUS	Bailey Ferguson
29	FW	NZL	Kian Donkers
32	DF	NZL	Everton O'Leary
37	FW	NZL	Ralph Rutherford
40	GK	NZL	Blake Callinan
41	FW	NZL	Aston Burns
50	GK	NZL	Eli Jones

== Player records ==
=== Most goals ===
As of 30 October 2026

- Does not include friendly matches.

#	Name	Goals
1	(Uruguay) Guillermo May	15
2	(New Zealand) Jesse Randall	12
5	(England) Sam Cosgrove	11
5	(New Zealand) Logan Rogerson	11
5	(Australia) Lachlan Brook	11
6	(Colombia) Neyder Moreno	8
9	(New Zealand) Nando Pijnaker	4
9	(Belgium) Louis Verstraete	4
9	(Japan) Hiroki Sakai	4
11	(Malta) Jake Brimmer	3
11	(New Zealand) Francis de Vries	3

== Honours ==
=== Domestic ===
- A-League Men Championship
  - Champions: 2026
- A-League Men Premiership
  - Champions: 2024–25

=== OFC ===
- OFC Professional League
  - Champions: 2026

== See also ==
- Expansion of the A-League
- List of association football clubs in New Zealand
- Association football in New Zealand
- Auckland FC Reserves
