= Auckland FC Reserves =

Auckland Reserves
- Full name: Auckland Football Club Reserves
- Founded: 12 February 2025; 19 months ago
- Ground: Fred Taylor Park
- Capacity: 1,000
- Owner(s): Black Knight Football and Entertainment
- Chairman: Bill Foley
- Head coach: Rory Fallon
- League: National League
- 2026: Northern League, 7th of 12; National League, TBD
- Website: aucklandfc.co.nz
Home colours	Away colours

Auckland Football Club Reserves is an association football team based in Auckland, New Zealand. They currently serve as the reserve side of the Auckland FC of the A-League and compete in the National League.

== History ==
Just over a week after Auckland FC was founded In March 2024, it was announced that they would enter a reserve team into the Northern League. This Caused controversy as it was also announced that this would alter the promotion and relegation process for the 2024 Northern League and NRFL Championship seasons just days before they commenced.

Luke Casserly was revealed as the inaugural reserves head coach on 10 February 2024. Auckland FC revealed their inaugural reserve squad on 14 February 2024. On 28 February 2025 Fred Taylor Park was revealed as the reserves home ground for their inaugural season. Auckland FC Reserves played their first ever competitive match on 22 March 2025 in a Northern League fixture away to Fencibles United. Codey Phoenix scored the club's first ever goal as they went on to draw their first match 1–1.

Auckland FC Reserves finished their inaugural Northern League season in 9th place, automatically qualifying for the 2025 National League due to A-League men requirements. In the 2025 National League Auckland FC reserves faced off against Wellington Phoenix Reserves in the first ever edition of the youth New Zealand Derby winning 2–1.

== Players ==
=== Reserves squad ===
As of 27 September 2026

Note: Flags indicate national team as defined under FIFA eligibility rules; some limited exceptions apply. Players may hold more than one non-FIFA nationality.

No.	Pos.	Nation	Player
33	DF	NZL	Carlos Ranui
37	FW	NZL	Ralph Rutherford
38	MF	NZL	Harrison Tisch
39	DF	NZL	Herewini Insley
41	FW	NZL	Aston Burns
43	DF	NZL	Riley Dalziell
44	DF	NZL	Loeki Van Baarzel
45	DF	NZL	Matthew D’Hotman
46	MF	NZL	James Mitchell (captain)
47	FW	NZL	Dejaun Naidoo
48	MF	NZL	Damion Kim
49	FW	NZL	Harley Hill

No.	Pos.	Nation	Player
50	GK	NZL	Eli Jones
51	DF	NZL	James Wenceslao
52	DF	NZL	Will Gross
55	FW	NZL	Sean Kane
56	MF	NZL	Michael Wong
58	MF	NZL	Nathan Martin
59	MF	CAM	Lucca Lim
60	GK	NZL	Liam Hill
61	MF	NZL	Luke Carter
63	MF	NZL	Evan Masamba
64	FW	NZL	Charlie Hale
65	MF	NZL	Louis Wickremesekera

==== Senior player appearances ====
Up to four professional players are eligible to play for the reserves side from this squad. Two under-20 players are also allowed if the reserves side's opposition agrees to their inclusion on match day.

== Coaching staff ==
=== Technical officials ===
Position	Name	Ref.
Head coach	(New Zealand) Rory Fallon	
Assistant coach		
Goalkeeping coach	(New Zealand) Oscar Mason	
Head of athletic development	(New Zealand) Peter Shaw	
Head analyst	(New Zealand) Jarrod Wallace	
Team manager	(New Zealand) Jack Jones	

== Season by season record ==
=== National League ===
Season	Qualifying league	League									National League									Chatham Cup	Top scorer	
Season	Qualifying league	P	W	D	L	F	A	GD	Pts	Pos	P	W	D	L	F	A	GD	Pts	Pos	Chatham Cup	Name	Goals
2025	Northern League	22	6	5	11	33	37	−4	23	9th	10	5	3	2	17	10	+7	18	4th	R2	(New Zealand) Ralph Rutherford	9
2026	Northern League	22	8	3	11	38	40	−2	27	7th										R2	(New Zealand) Harley Hill	10

Season	League	Div	P	W	D	L	GF	GA	GD	Pts	League Position	Chatham Cup	Top scorer	
Season	League	Div	P	W	D	L	GF	GA	GD	Pts	League Position	Chatham Cup	Name	Goals
2027	National League	1									TBD			

	Champions
	Runners-up
	Third Place
	Last Place
–	Did not make the Playoff
♦	Top scorer in competition
EF	Elimination finals
SF	Semi-finals

== See also ==
- Auckland FC
