= 2024 OFC Men's Nations Cup final =

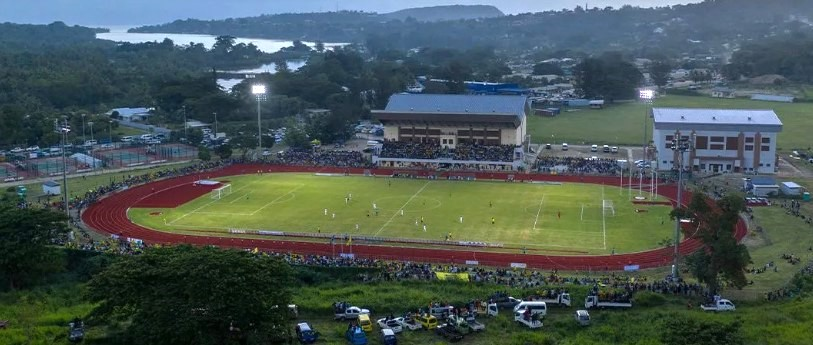
- The VFF Freshwater Stadium in Port Vila hosted the final.
- Event: 2024 OFC Men's Nations Cup
New Zealand	Vanuatu
(New Zealand)	(Vanuatu)
3	0
- Date: 30 June 2024
- Venue: VFF Freshwater Stadium, Port Vila
- Man of the Match: Liberato Cacace (New Zealand)
- Referee: Ben Aukwai (Solomon Islands)
- Attendance: 10,000

The 2024 OFC Men's Nations Cup final was a football match to determine the winners of 2024 OFC Men's Nations Cup. The match was the tenth final of the OFC Nations Cup, a quadrennial tournament contested by the men's national teams of the member associations of Oceania Football Confederation to decide the champions of Oceania. The match was held at the VFF Freshwater Stadium in Port Vila, Vanuatu, on 30 June 2024 and was contested by the winners of the semi-finals.

== Venue ==
The final was held at the VFF Freshwater Stadium in Port Vila, Vanuatu. In December 2023, OFC announced the 2024 tournament would be held in Vanuatu. The VFF Freshwater Stadium was chosen as the final venue of the tournament along with the Group B matches, and the semi-finals.

The VFF Freshwater Stadium opened in 2022 thanks to financing by FIFA. The stadium was owned by the Vanuatu Football Federation. The Vanuatu national team also occasionally played its home matches at the stadium. The VFF Freshwater Stadium had also hosted other significant matches, including several matches in the 2023 OFC Champions League, which included the final between Auckland City and Suva.

== Route to the final ==
New Zealand		Round	Vanuatu
Opponent	Result	Group stage	Opponent	Result
New Caledonia	Cancelled	Match 1	Solomon Islands	1–0
Solomon Islands	3–0	Match 2	New Caledonia	Cancelled
Vanuatu	4–0	Match 3	New Zealand	0–4
Opponent	Result	Knockout stage	Opponent	Result
Tahiti	5–0	Semi-finals	Fiji	2–1

== Match ==
=== Details ===
30 June 2024
15:00 VUT

New Zealand	3–0	Vanuatu
Howieson 2'; Randall 83'; Mata 90+1'	Report

VFF Freshwater Stadium, Port Vila
Attendance: 10,000
Referee: Ben Aukwai (Solomon Islands)

New Zealand	Vanuatu

GK	1	Max Crocombe
RB	2	Sam Sutton		(substituted off) 73'
CB	5	Finn Surman
CB	4	Tyler Bindon	(yellow card) 78'	(substituted off) 88'
LB	13	Liberato Cacace (c)
DM	8	Alex Rufer
RM	11	Elijah Just		(substituted off) 81'
LM	14	Ben Old		(substituted off) 88'
AM	6	Cameron Howieson
CF	9	Ben Waine		(substituted off) 73'
CF	7	Kosta Barbarouses
Substitutions:
DF	5	Tommy Smith		(substituted on) 73'
FW	25	Jesse Randall		(substituted on) 73'
FW	17	Alex Greive		(substituted on) 81'
DF	3	Lukas Kelly-Heald		(substituted on) 88'
FW	21	Max Mata		(substituted on) 88'
Manager:
(England) Darren Bazeley

GK	1	James Iamar
RB	3	Timothy Boulet	(yellow card) 8' (yellow-red card) 75'
CB	6	Jason Thomas
CB	4	Brian Kaltak (c)
LB	11	Tasso Jeffrey		(substituted off) 65'
RM	13	Johnathan Spokeyjack
CM	16	John Alick		(substituted off) 80'
CM	5	Jared Clark	(yellow card) 63'	(substituted off) 80'
LM	15	Godine Tenene
CF	14	John Wohale	(yellow card) 37'	(substituted off) 80'
CF	9	Alex Saniel		(substituted off) 65'
Substitutions:
DF	17	Kerry Iawak		(substituted on) 65'
FW	18	Kensi Tangis		(substituted on) 65'
MF	8	Claude Aru		(substituted on) 80'
MF	20	Alick Worworbu		(substituted on) 80'
FW	21	Joe Moses		(substituted on) 80'
Manager:
(Brazil) Juliano Schmeling

Man of the Match:
Liberato Cacace (New Zealand)
Assistant referees:
Folio Moeaki (Tonga)
Malaetala Salanoa (Samoa)
Fourth official:
Veer Singh (Fiji)
Fifth official:
Avinesh Narayan (Fiji)

Match rules

- 90 minutes.
- 30 minutes of extra time if necessary.
- Penalty shoot-out if scores still level.
- Maximum of twelve named substitutes.
- Maximum of five substitutions, with a sixth allowed in extra time. (Note: Each team was given only three opportunities to make substitutions, with a fourth opportunity in extra time, excluding substitutions made at half-time, before the start of extra time and at half-time in extra time.)

== See also ==
- New Zealand at the OFC Nations Cup
- Vanuatu at the OFC Nations Cup
