= 2024 OFC Men's Nations Cup knockout stage =

Stage of the football championship competition

The knockout stage of the 2024 OFC Men's Nations Cup began on 26 June 2024 with the semi-finals and ended on 30 June 2024 with the final at VFF Freshwater Stadium in Port Vila, Vanuatu.

All times listed are VUT (UTC+11)

== Format ==
In the knockout stage, if a match was level at the end of normal playing time, extra time was played (two periods of 15 minutes each). If still tied after extra time, the match was decided by a penalty shoot-out.

== Qualified teams ==
The top two placed teams from each of the two groups qualified for the knockout stage.

Group	Winners	Runners-up
A	New Zealand	Vanuatu
B	Fiji	Tahiti

== Bracket ==
Semi-finals
27 June – Port Vila
New Zealand	5
Tahiti	0
27 June – Port Vila
Fiji	1
Vanuatu	2

Final
30 June – Port Vila
New Zealand	3
Vanuatu	0
Third place play-off
30 June – Port Vila
Tahiti	2
Fiji	1

== Semi-finals ==
=== New Zealand vs Tahiti ===
27 June 2024
11:00

New Zealand	5–0	Tahiti
Surman 7'; Waine 45', 53'; Barbarouses 45+3', 72'	Report

VFF Freshwater Stadium, Port Vila
Attendance: 2,000
Referee: Veer Singh (Fiji)

New Zealand	Tahiti

GK	1	Max Crocombe
RB	2	Tim Payne		(substituted off) 25'
CB	5	Finn Surman
CB	4	Tyler Bindon	(yellow card) 38'	(substituted off) 46'
LB	13	Liberato Cacace (c)
DM	6	Cameron Howieson		(substituted off) 67'
CM	11	Elijah Just
CM	8	Alex Rufer
RW	9	Ben Waine		(substituted off) 67'
CF	7	Kosta Barbarouses
LW	14	Ben Old		(substituted off) 79'
Substitutions:
DF	5	Tommy Smith		(substituted in) 25'
DF	16	Sam Sutton		(substituted in) 46'
FW	17	Alex Greive		(substituted in) 67'
FW	21	Max Mata		(substituted in) 67'
FW	25	Jesse Randall		(substituted in) 79'
Manager:
(England) Darren Bazeley

GK	16	Teave Teamotuaitau
RB	20	Taumihau Tiatia		(substituted off) 56'
CB	7	Kevin Barbe
CB	15	Pothin Poma
LB	17	Teva Lossec	(yellow card) 20'
CM	6	Terai Bremond		(substituted off) 79'
CM	21	Matéo Degrumelle
CM	9	Tauhiti Keck
RW	10	Teaonui Tehau (c)
LW	11	Manuarii Shan		(substituted off) 66'
CF	18	Shawn Tinirauarii		(substituted off) 46'
Substitutions:
DF	19	Ariiura Labaste		(substituted in) 46'
MF	5	Ranui Aroita		(substituted in) 56'
MF	13	Franck Papaura		(substituted in) 66'
DF	12	Mauri Heitaa		(substituted in) 79'
Manager:
Samuel Garcia

Man of the Match:
Liberato Cacace (New Zealand)

Assistant referees:
Malaetala Salanoa (Samoa)
Folio Moeaki (Tonga)
Fourth official:
David Yareboinen (Papua New Guinea)
Fifth official:
Avinesh Narayab (Fiji)

=== Fiji vs Vanuatu ===
27 June 2024
15:00

Fiji	1–2	Vanuatu
Cavuilagi 46'	Report	Spokeyjack 12'; Thomas 56'

VFF Freshwater Stadium, Port Vila
Attendance: 5,200
Referee: Campbell-Kirk Kawana-Waugh (New Zealand)

Fiji	Vanuatu

== Third place play-off ==
30 June 2024
11:00

Tahiti	2–1	Fiji
T. Tehau 72', 83'	Report	Krishna 58'

VFF Freshwater Stadium, Port Vila
Attendance: 3,000
Referee: Campbell-Kirk Kawana-Waugh (New Zealand)

Tahiti	Fiji

== Final ==
30 June 2024
15:00

New Zealand	3–0	Vanuatu
Howieson 2'; Randall 83'; Mata 90+1'	Report

VFF Freshwater Stadium, Port Vila
Attendance: 10,000
Referee: Ben Aukwai (Solomon Islands)
