= Tahiti at the OFC Men's Nations Cup =

The Tahiti national football team has competed in ten editions of the OFC Men's Nations Cup, and won the title in 2012. The team is considered one of the best in Oceania. Tahiti also finished as runners-up three times, and is the only team other than Australia or New Zealand to win the continental trophy.

== Summary ==
Oceania Cup / OFC Nations Cup record
Year	Round	Position	Pld	W	D	L	GF	GA
(New Zealand) 1973	Runners-up	2nd	5	2	2	1	7	4
(New Caledonia) 1980	Runners-up	2nd	4	3	0	1	23	9
(Pacific Community) 1996	Runners-up	2nd	4	2	0	2	3	12
(Australia) 1998	Fourth place	4th	4	1	0	3	8	10
(French Polynesia) 2000	Group stage	5th	2	0	0	2	2	5
(New Zealand) 2002	Third place	3rd	5	3	0	2	8	9
(Australia) 2004	Group stage	5th	5	1	1	3	2	24
(Pacific Community) 2008	Did not qualify							
(Solomon Islands) 2012	Champions	1st	5	5	0	0	20	5
(Papua New Guinea) 2016	Group stage	5th	3	1	2	0	7	3
(Fiji) (Vanuatu) 2024	Third place	3rd	5	2	1	2	5	8
Total	1 Title	10/11	42	20	6	16	85	89

== Tournaments ==
=== 1973 Oceania Cup ===
==== First round ====
Pos	Team	Pld	W	D	L	GF	GA	GD	Pts	Qualification
1	New Zealand	4	3	1	0	11	4	+7	7	Advance to final
2	Tahiti	4	3	1	0	8	2	+6	7	Advance to final
3	New Caledonia	4	2	0	2	8	5	+3	4	Advance to third place play-off
4	New Hebrides	4	1	0	3	4	9	−5	2	Advance to third place play-off
5	Fiji	4	0	0	4	2	13	−11	0	

17 February 1973

Tahiti	2–1	New Caledonia
Erroll Bennett ?'; Alexis Tumahai ?'	Report	Roger Mandin ?'

Newmarket Park, Auckland
Referee: T. Delahunty (New Zealand)

18 February 1973

New Zealand	1–1	Tahiti
Alan Vest ?'	Report	Erroll Bennett ?'

Newmarket Park, Auckland
Referee: P. Raman (Fiji)

20 February 1973

Tahiti	1–0	New Hebrides
Erroll Bennett ?'	Report

Newmarket Park, Auckland
Referee: A. Nakagawa (New Caledonia)

23 February 1973

Tahiti	4–0	Fiji
Claude Carrara ?'; Harold Ng Fok ?'; Gilles Malinowski ?'; Roland de Marigny ?'	Report

Newmarket Park, Auckland
Referee: A. Nakagawa (New Caledonia)

==== Final ====
24 February 1973

New Zealand	2–0	Tahiti
David Taylor ?'; Alan Marley ?'	Report

Newmarket Park, Auckland
Referee: B. Chaudet (New Hebrides)

=== 1980 Oceania Cup ===
==== Group stage ====
Pos	Team	Pld	W	D	L	GF	GA	GD	Pts	Qualification
1	Tahiti	3	3	0	0	21	5	+16	6	Advance to final
2	Fiji	3	2	0	1	10	7	+3	4	Advance to third place play-off
3	New Zealand	3	1	0	2	7	8	−1	2	
4	Solomon Islands	3	0	0	3	3	21	−18	0	

25 February 1980

Tahiti	3–1	New Zealand
Alfred Wabealo 61', 73'; Erroll Bennett 85'		Steve Sumner 47' (pen.)

Stade de Magenta, Noumea

27 February 1980

Tahiti	12–1	Solomon Islands

Stade de Magenta, Noumea

29 February 1980

Tahiti	6–3	Fiji

Stade de Magenta, Noumea

==== Final ====
1 March 1980

Australia	4–2	Tahiti
Paul Kay 4', 29'; Danny Moulis; Vic Bozanic		Andre Wabealo 11'; Erroll Bennett

Noumea

=== 1996 OFC Nations Cup ===
==== Semifinals ====
17 November 1995

Solomon Islands	0–1	Tahiti
		Jean-Loup Rousseau 72'

Lawson Tama Stadium, Honiara
Attendance: 15,000
Referee: Intaz Shah (Fiji)

11 May 1996

Tahiti	2–1	Solomon Islands
Jean-Loup Rousseau 46'; Macha Gatien 88'		Robert Seni 81'

Stade Pater, Papeete
Attendance: 15,000
Referee: Derek Rugg (New Zealand)

Tahiti won 3–1 on aggregate.

==== Final ====
27 October 1996

Tahiti	0–6	Australia
		Ernie Tapai 5'; Paul Trimboli 20'; Kris Trajanovski 25', 28', 44', 89'

Olympic Stadium, Papeete
Attendance: 5,000
Referee: Barry Tasker (New Zealand)

1 November 1996

Australia	5–0	Tahiti
Robbie Hooker 11'; Kris Trajanovski 21', 36', 54'; Rupena Raumati 31' (o.g.)

Bruce Stadium, Canberra
Attendance: 9,421
Referee: Intaz Shah (Fiji)

Australia won 11–0 on aggregate.

=== 1998 OFC Nations Cup ===
==== Group stage ====
Pos	Team	Pld	W	D	L	GF	GA	GD	Pts	Qualification
1	New Zealand	2	2	0	0	9	1	+8	6	Advance to knockout stage
2	Tahiti	2	1	0	1	5	2	+3	3	Advance to knockout stage
3	Vanuatu	2	0	0	2	2	13	−11	0	

25 September 1998

New Zealand	1–0	Tahiti
Paama 13' (o.g.)	Report

Lang Park, Brisbane
Attendance: 900
Referee: Simon Micallef (Australia)

30 September 1998

Tahiti	5–1	Vanuatu
Quennet 9', 10', 74'; Zaveroni 54'; Amaru 75'	Report	Rarai 82'

Lang Park, Brisbane
Attendance: 400
Referee: Simon Micallef (Australia)

=== Semifinals ===
2 October 1998

Australia	4–1	Tahiti
Mori 1', 32', 81'; Veart 86'	Report	Labaste 55'

Lang Park, Brisbane
Attendance: 1,200
Referee: Intaz Shah (Fiji)

==== Third place match ====
4 October 1998

Fiji	4–2	Tahiti
Masi 26', 31'; Lal 28'; Seruvatu 43'	Report	Rousseau 81', 82'

Lang Park, Brisbane
Attendance: 2,000
Referee: Simon Micallef (Australia)

=== 2000 OFC Nations Cup ===
==== Group stage ====
Pos	Team	Pld	W	D	L	GF	GA	GD	Pts	Qualification
1	New Zealand	2	2	0	0	5	1	+4	6	Advance to knockout stage
2	Vanuatu	2	1	0	1	4	5	−1	3	Advance to knockout stage
3	Tahiti (H)	2	0	0	2	2	5	−3	0	

(H) Hosts
19 Jun 2000

New Zealand	2–0	Tahiti
Kris Bouckenooghe 27'; Chris Jackson 78'

Stade Pater, Papeete
Attendance: 1,000

22 Jun 2000

Vanuatu	3–2	Tahiti
Jimmy Ben 49'; Richard Iwai 60'; Georgina Tura 77'		Jean-Loup Rousseau 2' (pen.); Harold Amaru 87'

Stade Pater, Papeete
Attendance: 300

=== 2002 OFC Nations Cup ===
==== Group stage ====
Pos	Team	Pld	W	D	L	GF	GA	GD	Pts	Qualification
1	New Zealand	3	3	0	0	19	2	+17	9	Advance to knockout stage
2	Tahiti	3	2	0	1	6	7	−1	6	Advance to knockout stage
3	Solomon Islands	3	0	1	2	3	9	−6	1	
4	Papua New Guinea	3	0	1	2	2	12	−10	1	

5 July 2002

New Zealand	4–0	Tahiti
Nelsen 30'; Vicelich 49'; Urlovic 80'; Campbell 88'	Report

North Harbour Stadium, Albany
Attendance: 1,000
Referee: Harry Attison (Vanuatu)

7 July 2002

Tahiti	3–2	Solomon Islands
Booene 42'; Tagawa 57'; Fatupua-Lecaill 90+'	Report	Daudau 8'; Menapi 25'

North Harbour Stadium, Albany
Attendance: 1,000
Referee: Matthew Breeze (Australia)

9 July 2002

Tahiti	3–1	Papua New Guinea
Garcia 29'; Tagawa 49', 64'	Report	Davani 43'

North Harbour Stadium, Albany
Attendance: 800
Referee: Leonie Rakaroi (Fiji)

==== Semifinals ====
12 July 2002

Australia	2–1 (a.e.t.)	Tahiti
Porter 88'; Mori 96'	Report	Zaveroni 38'

Ericsson Stadium, Auckland
Attendance: 400
Referee: Derek Rugg (New Zealand)

==== Third place match ====
14 July 2002

Tahiti	1–0	Vanuatu
Auraa 65'	Report

Ericsson Stadium, Auckland
Attendance: 1,000
Referee: Leone Rakaroi (Fiji)

=== 2004 OFC Nations Cup ===
==== Group stage ====
Pos	Team	Pld	W	D	L	GF	GA	GD	Pts	Qualification
1	Australia	5	4	1	0	21	3	+18	13	Advance to final
2	Solomon Islands	5	3	1	1	9	6	+3	10	Advance to final
3	New Zealand	5	3	0	2	17	5	+12	9	
4	Fiji	5	1	1	3	3	10	−7	4	
5	Tahiti	5	1	1	3	2	24	−22	4	
6	Vanuatu	5	1	0	4	5	9	−4	3	

Rules for classification: Tiebreakers
29 May 2004

Tahiti	0–0	Fiji
	Report

Hindmarsh Stadium, Adelaide
Attendance: 3,000
Referee: Stefano Farina (Italy)

31 May 2004

Australia	9–0	Tahiti
Cahill 14', 47'; Skoko 43'; Simon 44' (o.g.); Sterjovski 51', 61', 74'; Zdrilic 85'; Chipperfield 89'	Report

Hindmarsh Stadium, Adelaide
Attendance: 1,200
Referee: Harry Attison (Vanuatu)

2 June 2004

Tahiti	0–4	Solomon Islands
	Report	Fa'arodo 9'; Menapi 14', 80'; Batram Suri 42'

Hindmarsh Stadium, Adelaide
Attendance: 50
Referee: Leone Rakaroi (Fiji)

4 June 2004

New Zealand	10–0	Tahiti
Coveny 6', 38', 45'; Fisher 16', 22', 63'; Jones 72'; Oughton 74'; Nelsen 82', 87'	Report

Marden Sports Complex, Adelaide
Attendance: 200
Referee: Mark Shield (Australia)

6 June 2004

Tahiti	2–1	Vanuatu
Temataua 40'; Wajoka 89'	Report	Iwai 23'

Marden Sports Complex, Adelaide
Attendance: 300
Referee: Leone Rakaroi (Fiji)

=== 2012 OFC Nations Cup ===
==== Group stage ====
Team	Pld	W	D	L	GF	GA	GD	Pts	Qualification
Tahiti	3	3	0	0	18	5	+13	9	Semifinals and World Cup qualifying third round
New Caledonia	3	2	0	1	17	6	+11	6	Semifinals and World Cup qualifying third round
Vanuatu	3	1	0	2	8	9	−1	3	
Samoa	3	0	0	3	1	24	−23	0	

1 June 2012
12:00 UTC+11

Samoa	1–10	Tahiti
Malo 69'	Report	L. Tehau 8', 82', 84', 85'; J. Tehau 16', 78'; A. Tehau 18', 40'; T. Tehau 54'; Chong Hue 61'

Lawson Tama Stadium, Honiara
Attendance: 3,000
Referee: Gerald Oiaka (Solomon Islands)

3 June 2012
15:00 UTC+11

Tahiti	4–3	New Caledonia
A. Tehau 19'; Vallar 28' (pen.); L. Tehau 34'; Degage 86'	Report	Bako 76'; Haeko 83'; Kauma 89'

Lawson Tama Stadium, Honiara
Attendance: 3,500
Referee: Chris Kerr (New Zealand)

5 June 2012
15:00 UTC+11

Tahiti	4–1	Vanuatu
Vallar 14' (pen.); J. Tehau 37'; A. Tehau 57'; T. Tehau 86'	Report	Tasso 90+5'

Lawson Tama Stadium, Honiara
Attendance: 1,000
Referee: Peter O'Leary (New Zealand)

==== Semifinals ====
8 June 2012
11:00 UTC+11

Tahiti	1–0	Solomon Islands
J. Tehau 15'	Report

Lawson Tama Stadium, Honiara
Attendance: 15,000
Referee: Peter O'Leary (New Zealand)

==== Final ====
10 June 2012
15:00 UTC+11

Tahiti	1–0	New Caledonia
Chong Hue 10'	Report

Lawson Tama Stadium, Honiara
Attendance: 10,000
Referee: Peter O'Leary (New Zealand)

=== 2016 OFC Nations Cup ===
==== Group stage ====
Pos	Team	Pld	W	D	L	GF	GA	GD	Pts	Qualification
1	Papua New Guinea (H)	3	1	2	0	11	3	+8	5	Qualification to Nations Cup knockout stage and World Cup qualifying third round
2	New Caledonia	3	1	2	0	9	2	+7	5	Qualification to Nations Cup knockout stage and World Cup qualifying third round
3	Tahiti	3	1	2	0	7	3	+4	5	Qualification to World Cup qualifying third round
4	Samoa	3	0	0	3	0	19	−19	0	

Source: FIFA
Rules for classification: Qualification tiebreakers
(H) Hosts
29 May 2016
19:00

Tahiti	4–0	Samoa
T. Tehau 2', 5'; Chong Hue 15'; A. Tehau 39'	Report (FIFA); Report (OFC)

Sir John Guise Stadium, Port Moresby
Attendance: 4,720
Referee: Ravitesh Behari (Fiji)

1 June 2016
16:00

Papua New Guinea	2–2	Tahiti
Gunemba 45+1', 64'	Report (FIFA); Report (OFC)	A. Tehau 66'; T. Tehau 76'

Sir John Guise Stadium, Port Moresby
Attendance: 1,643
Referee: Nick Waldron (New Zealand)

5 June 2016
19:00

Tahiti	1–1	New Caledonia
T. Tehau 90+2'	Report (FIFA); Report (OFC)	Kaï 80'

Sir John Guise Stadium, Port Moresby
Attendance: 3,158
Referee: Nick Waldron (New Zealand)

=== 2024 OFC Men's Nations Cup ===
==== Group stage ====
Pos	Team	Pld	W	D	L	GF	GA	GD	Pts	Qualification
1	Fiji (H)	3	3	0	0	15	2	+13	9	Advance to knockout stage
2	Tahiti	3	1	1	1	3	2	+1	4	Advance to knockout stage
3	Papua New Guinea	3	1	1	1	4	7	−3	4	
4	Samoa	3	0	0	3	2	13	−11	0	

Source: OFC
(H) Hosts
16 June 2024
13:00

Tahiti	2–0	Samoa
Degrumelle 4'; T. Tehau 28'	Report

HFC Bank Stadium, Suva
Attendance: 500
Referee: Ben Aukwai (Solomon Islands)

19 June 2024
16:00

Papua New Guinea	1–1	Tahiti
Paul 25'	Report	Degrumelle 15'

HFC Bank Stadium, Suva
Attendance: 500
Referee: Campbell-Kirk Kawana-Waugh (New Zealand)

22 June 2024
19:00

Fiji	1–0	Tahiti
Krishna 26' (pen.)	Report

HFC Bank Stadium, Suva
Attendance: 1,500
Referee: Campbell-Kirk Kawana-Waugh (New Zealand)

==== Semi-finals ====
27 June 2024
11:00

New Zealand	5–0	Tahiti
Surman 7'; Waine 45', 53'; Barbarouses 45+3', 72'	Report

VFF Freshwater Stadium, Port Vila
Attendance: 2,000
Referee: Veer Singh (Fiji)

==== Third place match ====
30 June 2024
11:00

Tahiti	2–1	Fiji
T. Tehau 72', 83'	Report	Krishna 58'

VFF Freshwater Stadium, Port Vila
Attendance: 3,000
Referee: Campbell-Kirk Kawana-Waugh (New Zealand)

== See also ==
- Tahiti at the FIFA Confederations Cup
