= 2024 OFC Men's Nations Cup Group B =

Group B of the 2024 OFC Men's Nations Cup took take place from 16 to 22 June 2024. The group consisted of Fiji, Papua New Guinea, Tahiti and the qualifying winner.

Originally due to take place at the Luganville Soccer Stadium in Luganville, Vanuatu, all six group matches were moved to the HFC Bank Stadium in Suva, Fiji over uncertainty around flight schedules.

== Teams ==
Draw position	Team	Pot	Method of qualification	Date of qualification	Finals appearance	Last appearance	Previous best performance	FIFA Rankings	
Draw position	Team	Pot	Method of qualification	Date of qualification	Finals appearance	Last appearance	Previous best performance	December 2023 (Note: The rankings of December 2023 were used at the time of the draw, although were not taken into account.)	April 2024
B1	Papua New Guinea	1	Automatic	24 January 2024	5th	2016	Runners-up (2016)	165	166
B2	Fiji	2	Automatic	24 January 2024	9th	2016	Third place (1998, 2008)	168	168
B3	Tahiti	2	Automatic	24 January 2024	10th	2016	Winners (2012)	163	162
B4	Samoa	3	Qualifying winner	23 March 2024	3rd	2016	Group Stage (2012, 2016)	186	181

== Standings ==
Pos	Team	Pld	W	D	L	GF	GA	GD	Pts	Qualification
1	Fiji (H)	3	3	0	0	15	2	+13	9	Advance to knockout stage
2	Tahiti	3	1	1	1	3	2	+1	4	Advance to knockout stage
3	Papua New Guinea	3	1	1	1	4	7	−3	4	
4	Samoa	3	0	0	3	2	13	−11	0	

Source: OFC
Rules for classification: Group stage tiebreakers
(H) Hosts

In the knockout stage:

- The winners of Group B, Fiji, advanced to play the runners-up of Group A, Vanuatu.
- The runners-up of Group B, Tahiti, advanced to play the winners of Group A, New Zealand.

== Matches ==
All times are local, UTC+12.

=== Tahiti v Samoa ===
16 June 2024
13:00

Tahiti	2–0	Samoa
Degrumelle 4'; T. Tehau 28'	Report

HFC Bank Stadium, Suva
Attendance: 500
Referee: Ben Aukwai (Solomon Islands)

Tahiti	Samoa

=== Papua New Guinea v Fiji ===
16 June 2024
16:00

Papua New Guinea	1–5	Fiji
Semmy 88'	Report	Begg 2'; Dunn 43', 52'; A. Komolong 55' (o.g.); Krishna 64'

HFC Bank Stadium, Suva
Attendance: 1,700
Referee: Calvin Berg (New Zealand)

Papua New Guinea	Fiji

=== Papua New Guinea v Tahiti ===
19 June 2024
16:00

Papua New Guinea	1–1	Tahiti
Paul 25'	Report	Degrumelle 15'

HFC Bank Stadium, Suva
Attendance: 500
Referee: Campbell-Kirk Kawana-Waugh (New Zealand)

Papua New Guinea	Tahiti

=== Samoa v Fiji ===
19 June 2024
19:00

Samoa	1–9	Fiji
Salisbury 47'	Report	Hughes 3', 61'; Dunn 38'; Krishna 45+3' (pen.), 53' (pen.); Baravilala 64'; Begg 67'; Dogalau 83', 89'

HFC Bank Stadium, Suva
Attendance: 1,300
Referee: Calvin Berg (New Zealand)

Samoa	Fiji

=== Samoa v Papua New Guinea ===
22 June 2024
16:00

Samoa	1–2	Papua New Guinea
Trainor 67'	Report	Semmy 26'; Kepo 47'

HFC Bank Stadium, Suva
Attendance: 500
Referee: Ben Aukwai (Solomon Islands)

Samoa	Papua New Guinea

=== Fiji v Tahiti ===
22 June 2024
19:00

Fiji	1–0	Tahiti
Krishna 26' (pen.)	Report

HFC Bank Stadium, Suva
Attendance: 1,500
Referee: Campbell-Kirk Kawana-Waugh (New Zealand)

Fiji	Tahiti

== Discipline ==
Fair play points would have been used as tiebreakers if the overall and head-to-head records of teams were tied. These were calculated based on yellow and red cards received in all group matches as follows:

- first yellow card: −1 point;
- indirect red card (second yellow card): −3 points;
- direct red card: −4 points;
- yellow card and direct red card: −5 points;

Only one of the above deductions will be applied to a player in a single match.

Team	Match 1				Match 2				Match 3				Points
Team	Booked	(yellow card) (yellow-red card)	Sent off (straight red)	(yellow card) (red card)	Booked	(yellow card) (yellow-red card)	Sent off (straight red)	(yellow card) (red card)	Booked	(yellow card) (yellow-red card)	Sent off (straight red)	(yellow card) (red card)	Points
Papua New Guinea					2				2				−4
Samoa	1				1				2				−4
Fiji	1				3				1				−5
Tahiti	3				1		1		1				−9

== See also ==
- Fiji at the OFC Nations Cup
- Papua New Guinea at the OFC Nations Cup
- Samoa at the OFC Nations Cup
- Tahiti at the OFC Nations Cup
