= 2024 OFC Men's Nations Cup Group A =

Group A of the 2024 OFC Men's Nations Cup took place from 15 to 21 June 2024. The group originally consisted of New Caledonia, defending champions New Zealand, Solomon Islands and hosts Vanuatu. However, New Caledonia withdrew from the tournament on 5 June due to the serious crisis in the country, leaving the group with three teams left.

== Teams ==
| Draw position | Team | Pot | Method of qualification | Date of qualification | Finals appearance | Last appearance | Previous best performance | FIFA Rankings | |
| Draw position | Team | Pot | Method of qualification | Date of qualification | Finals appearance | Last appearance | Previous best performance | December 2023 (Note: The rankings of December 2023 were used at the time of the draw, although were not taken into account.) | April 2024 |
|---|---|---|---|---|---|---|---|---|---|
| A1 | New Zealand | 1 | Automatic | 24 January 2024 | 11th | 2016 | Winners (1973, 1998, 2002, 2008, 2016) | 104 | 104 |
| A2 | New Caledonia (Note: New Caledonia withdrew from the tournament on 5 June 2024 due to the social unrest in the country.) | 2 | Automatic | 24 January 2024 | 7th | 2016 | Runners-up (2008, 2012) | 159 | 158 |
| A3 | Solomon Islands | 2 | Automatic | 24 January 2024 | 8th | 2016 | Runners-up (2004) | 132 | 132 |
| A4 | Vanuatu (hosts) | 3 | Automatic | 1 December 2023 | 10th | 2016 | Fourth place (1973, 2000, 2002, 2008) | 170 | 172 |

== Standings ==
| Pos | Team | Pld | W | D | L | GF | GA | GD | Pts | Qualification |
|---|---|---|---|---|---|---|---|---|---|---|
| 1 | New Zealand | 2 | 2 | 0 | 0 | 7 | 0 | +7 | 6 | Advance to knockout stage |
| 2 | Vanuatu (H) | 2 | 1 | 0 | 1 | 1 | 4 | −3 | 3 | Advance to knockout stage |
| 3 | Solomon Islands | 2 | 0 | 0 | 2 | 0 | 4 | −4 | 0 | |
| 4 | New Caledonia | 0 | 0 | 0 | 0 | 0 | 0 | 0 | 0 | Withdrew |

Source: OFC
Rules for classification: Group stage tiebreakers
(H) Hosts

In the knockout stage:

- The winners of Group A, New Zealand, advanced to play the runners-up of Group B, Tahiti.
- The runners-up of Group A, Vanuatu, advanced to play the winners of Group B, Fiji.

== Matches ==
All times are local, VUT (UTC+11).

=== New Zealand v New Caledonia ===
15 June 2024
12:00

| New Zealand | Cancelled | New Caledonia |

VFF Freshwater Stadium, Port Vila

=== Solomon Islands v Vanuatu ===
15 June 2024
15:00

| Solomon Islands | 0–1 | Vanuatu |
|---|---|---|
| | Report | Tangis 72' |

VFF Freshwater Stadium, Port Vila
Attendance: 5,000
Referee: Veer Singh (Fiji)

| Solomon Islands | Vanuatu |

=== New Zealand v Solomon Islands ===
18 June 2024
15:00

| New Zealand | 3–0 | Solomon Islands |
|---|---|---|
| Waine 6', 11'; Barbarouses 45+4' | Report |

VFF Freshwater Stadium, Port Vila
Attendance: 3,000
Referee: David Yareboinen (Papua New Guinea)

| New Zealand | Solomon Islands |

=== Vanuatu v New Caledonia ===
18 June 2024
15:00

| Vanuatu | Cancelled | New Caledonia |

VFF Freshwater Stadium, Port Vila

=== New Caledonia v Solomon Islands ===
21 June 2024
12:00

| New Caledonia | Cancelled | Solomon Islands |

VFF Freshwater Stadium, Port Vila

=== Vanuatu v New Zealand ===
21 June 2024
15:00

| Vanuatu | 0–4 | New Zealand |
|---|---|---|
| | Report | Mata 10'; Kaltak 27' (o.g.); Just 63'; Old 78' |

VFF Freshwater Stadium, Port Vila
Attendance: 7,200
Referee: Veer Singh (Fiji)

| Vanuatu | New Zealand |

== Discipline ==
Fair play points would have been used as tiebreakers if the overall and head-to-head records of teams were tied. These were calculated based on yellow and red cards received in all group matches as follows:

- first yellow card: −1 point;
- indirect red card (second yellow card): −3 points;
- direct red card: −4 points;
- yellow card and direct red card: −5 points;

Only one of the above deductions will be applied to a player in a single match.

| Team | Match 1 | | | | Match 2 | | | | Match 3 | | | | Points |
| Team | Booked | (yellow card) (yellow-red card) | Sent off (straight red) | (yellow card) (red card) | Booked | (yellow card) (yellow-red card) | Sent off (straight red) | (yellow card) (red card) | Booked | (yellow card) (yellow-red card) | Sent off (straight red) | (yellow card) (red card) | Points |
|---|---|---|---|---|---|---|---|---|---|---|---|---|---|
| Vanuatu | 1 | | | | | | | | | | | | −1 |
| Solomon Islands | 2 | | | | 1 | | | | | | | | −3 |
| New Zealand | | | | | | | | | 4 | | | | –4 |

== See also ==
- New Zealand at the OFC Nations Cup
- Solomon Islands at the OFC Nations Cup
- Vanuatu at the OFC Nations Cup
