= 2024 OFC Nations Cup group stage =

The 2024 OFC Nations Cup group stage can refer to one of the two articles.

- 2024 OFC Nations Cup Group A
- 2024 OFC Nations Cup Group B
