= 2024 OFC Men's Nations Cup =

2024 OFC Nations Cup
Coupe de Océanie de les nations 2024; 2024 ओएफसी नेशंस कप

Tournament details
- Host countries: Fiji; Vanuatu
- Dates: 15–30 June
- Teams: 7 (from 1 confederation)
- Venues: 2 (in 2 host cities)

Final positions
- Champions: New Zealand (6th title)
- Runners-up: Vanuatu
- Third place: Tahiti
- Fourth place: Fiji

Tournament statistics
- Matches played: 13
- Goals scored: 46 (3.54 per match)
- Attendance: 41,400 (3,185 per match)
- Top scorer: (Fiji) Roy Krishna (5 goals)
- Best player: (New Zealand) Liberato Cacace
- Best young player: (New Zealand) Finn Surman
- Best goalkeeper: (New Zealand) Max Crocombe
- Fair play award: New Zealand

The 2024 OFC Men's Nations Cup was the 11th edition of the OFC Men's Nations Cup, the quadrennial international men's football championship of Oceania organised by the Oceania Football Confederation (OFC). The tournament was played between 15 and 30 June 2024 in Fiji and Vanuatu. The defending champions were New Zealand from the 2016 edition; the 2020 edition was cancelled due to the COVID-19 pandemic. New Caledonia withdrew a few days before the start of the competition citing riots in the country, and the tournament played with seven teams.

A total of 13 matches were played, in which 46 goals were scored, at an average of 3.54 goals per match. Attendance at all stages of the tournament reached 41,400, averaging 3,185 viewers per match. The biggest score recorded in the tournament was 9–1 when Fiji defeated Samoa on the second day of Group B.

New Zealand won the title for the record-extending sixth time in their history, after beating co-hosts Vanuatu in the final match with a score of 3–0, so the All Whites successfully defended their title. Tahiti secured third place after beating Fiji in the third place match, which placed them fourth. Fijian Roy Krishna finished the tournament as top scorer with five goals. New Zealander Liberato Cacace also won the best player award, while his compatriot Max Crocombe won the best goalkeeper award. New Zealand also won the fair play award.

== Host selection ==
Although New Zealand was selected as host for the final tournament in 2020 before it was eventually cancelled, in December 2023 it was announced that the 2024 edition of the tournament would be held in Vanuatu.

In May 2024, following uncertainty around flight schedules, matches due to be played at the Luganville Soccer Stadium in Luganville, Vanuatu were moved to the HFC Bank Stadium in Suva, Fiji and the VFF Freshwater Stadium in Port Vila, Vanuatu.

== Venues ==
Location of the host cities of the 2024 OFC Men's Nations Cup.
- Vanuatu
- 1 Port Vila
- Fiji
- 2 Suva

Since it was announced in December 2023, Vanuatu is set to host the entire tournament at Luganville Soccer Stadium in Luganville and VFF Freshwater Stadium in Port Vila. Following uncertainty over flight schedules, matches scheduled to be held at Luganville Soccer Stadium in Loganville, Vanuatu have been moved to HFC Bank Stadium in Suva, Fiji.

Vanuatu	Fiji
Port Vila	Suva
VFF Freshwater Stadium	HFC Bank Stadium
Capacity: 6,500	Capacity: 4,300

== Teams ==
=== Qualification ===
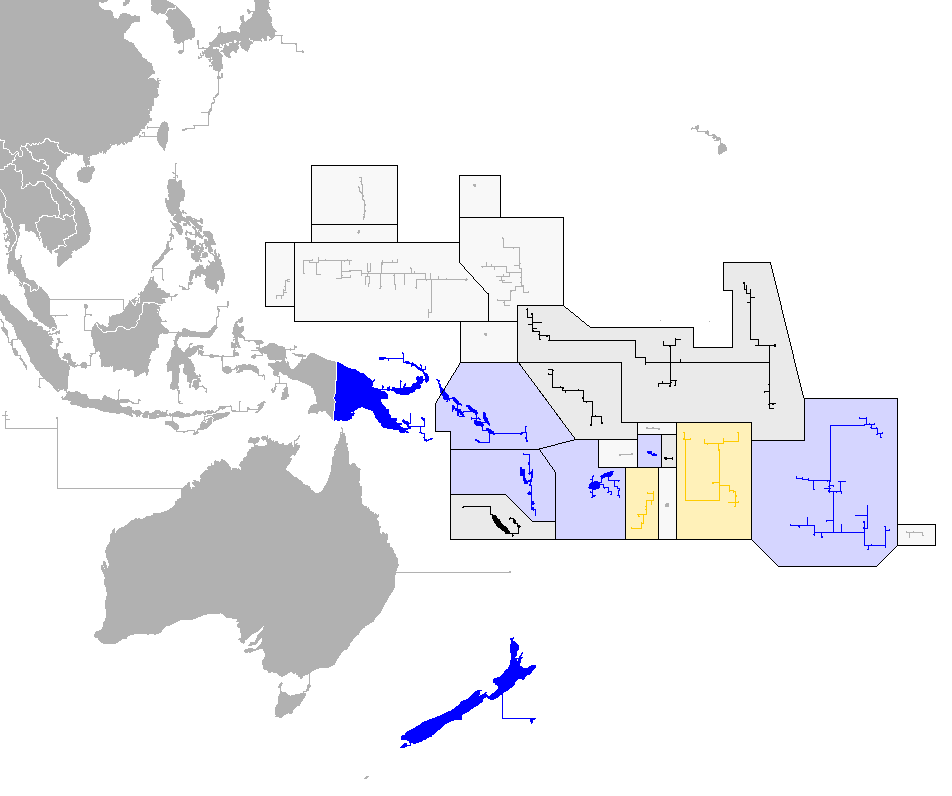
Status of countries with respect to the 2024 OFC Men's Nations Cup: Qualified Failed to qualify Withdrew or suspended Not a member of the OFC

The four lowest ranked teams originally entered for qualification were played in a single group tournament, as in previous editions in 2012 and 2016. Tuvalu and Kiribati were not full members of the OFC and were therefore excluded from participation. American Samoa did not register before qualifying.

In the qualifying tournament, the three lowest-ranked teams in the last edition of the tournament in 2016 (because American Samoa did not register), competed in a Round robin format in a single round, which was held in a single venue in Tonga, where the winner qualified for the final tournament. On 5 June 2024, New Caledonia announced their withdrawal from the tournament due to the serious crisis in the country.

=== Qualified teams ===
Team	Method of qualification	Date of qualification	Finals appearance	Last appearance	Previous best performance	FIFA ranking at the start of the tournament
Vanuatu (Note: From 1973 and 1980, Vanuatu competed as the New Hebrides.)	Co-hosts	1 December 2023	10th	2016	Fourth place (1973, 2000, 2002, 2008)	172
Fiji	Co-hosts	24 January 2024	9th	2016	Third place (1998, 2008)	168
~~New Caledonia~~ (Note: New Caledonia withdrew from the tournament on 5 June 2024 due to the social unrest in the country.)	Automatic qualification	~~24 January 2024~~	7th	2016	Runners-up (2008, 2012)	158
New Zealand	Automatic qualification	24 January 2024	11th	2016	Champions (1973, 1998, 2002, 2008, 2016)	104
Papua New Guinea	Automatic qualification	24 January 2024	5th	2016	Runners-up (2016)	166
Solomon Islands	Automatic qualification	24 January 2024	8th	2016	Runners-up (2004)	132
Tahiti	Automatic qualification	24 January 2024	10th	2016	Champions (2012)	162
Samoa	Qualifying tournament winners	23 March 2024	3rd	2016	Group stage (2012, 2016)	181

== Match officials ==
Referees

- (Fiji) Veer Singh
- (New Zealand) Calvin Berg
- (New Zealand) Campbell-Kirk Kawana-Waugh
- (Papua New Guinea) David Yareboinen
- (Solomon Islands) Ben Aukwai
- (Solomon Islands) Shama Maemae
- (French Polynesia) Teremoana Roihau

Assistant referees

- (Fiji) Avinesh Narayan
- (New Zealand) Mark Rule
- (New Zealand) Isaac Trevis
- (Samoa) Malaetala Salanoa
- (Solomon Islands) Natalia Lumukana
- (Solomon Islands) Bernard Mutukera
- (Solomon Islands) Jeffery Solodia
- (French Polynesia) Vaihina Teura
- (Tonga) Folio Moeaki
- (Vanuatu) Jeremy Garae

== Format ==
The tournament followed the previous system of a preliminary qualification round followed by an eight-team (eventually seven) group stage, in which the top two places in each advanced to the semi-finals. In these, the two losers of each will compete in the play-off for third place, while the winners of these will compete in the final to determine the tournament champion.

== Draw ==
The draw was held on 24 January 2024 at OFC Home of Football in Auckland, New Zealand. The teams were divided into two groups of four each, with the three initial pots determined based on the final ranking of the 2016 OFC Nations Cup, listed below.

Pot 1
Team	Rank
New Zealand	1
Papua New Guinea	2

Pot 2
Team	Rank
~~New Caledonia~~ (Note: Withdrew after the official draw.)	3
Solomon Islands	4
Tahiti	5
Fiji	6

Pot 3
Team	Rank
Vanuatu	7
Samoa (Note: Qualifying tournament winners, team not determined at the time of the draw.)	8

== Group stage ==
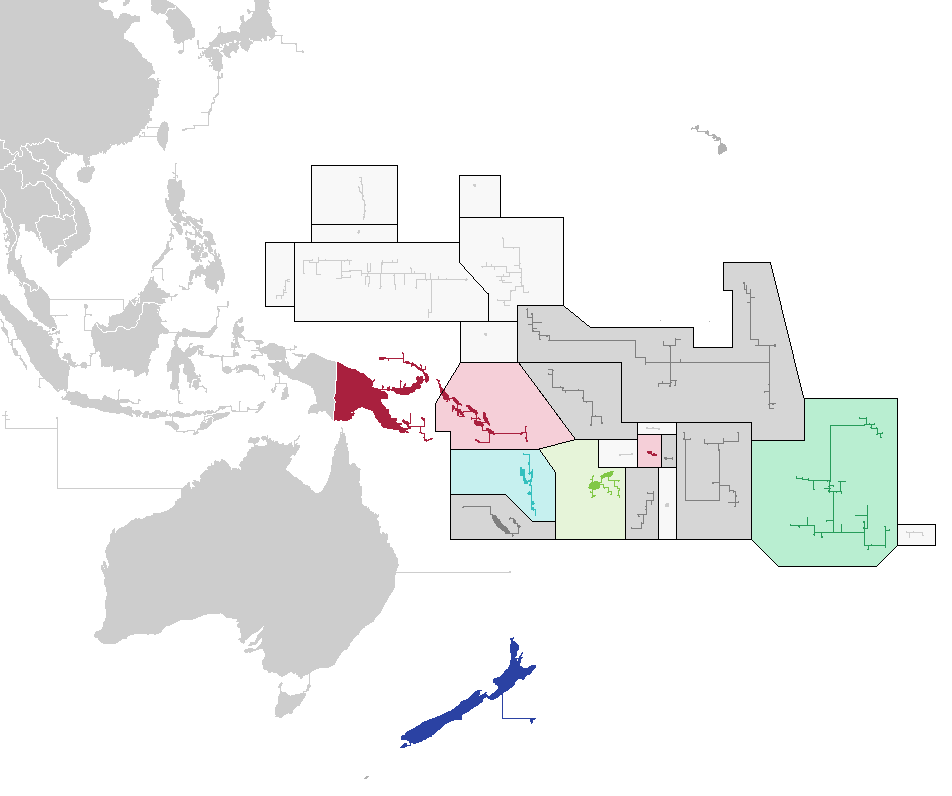
Result of teams participating in 2024 OFC Nations Cup: Winners Runners-up / Third place Fourth place / Group stage

All times are local, UTC+11 (Group A) and UTC+12 (Group B).

=== Tiebreakers ===
Tie-breaking criteria for group play

The ranking of teams in the group stage was determined as follows:

1. Total points;
2. Goal difference in all group matches;
3. Goals scored in all group matches;
4. Head-to-head result between tied teams;
  1. Points in matches among the tied teams;
  2. Goal difference in matches among the tied teams;
  3. Goals scored in matches among the tied teams;
5. Fair play points in all group matches (only one deduction per player, per match):
  - One yellow card: −1 point;
  - Two yellow cards (indirect red card): −3 points;
  - Direct red card: −4 points;
  - Yellow card and direct red card: −5 points;
6. Drawing of lots.

=== Group A ===
Pos	Team	Pld	W	D	L	GF	GA	GD	Pts	Qualification
1	New Zealand	2	2	0	0	7	0	+7	6	Advance to knockout stage
2	Vanuatu (H)	2	1	0	1	1	4	−3	3	Advance to knockout stage
3	Solomon Islands	2	0	0	2	0	4	−4	0	
4	New Caledonia	0	0	0	0	0	0	0	0	Withdrew

Source: OFC
(H) Hosts
15 June 2024
12:00

New Zealand	Cancelled	New Caledonia

VFF Freshwater Stadium, Port Vila
15 June 2024
15:00

Solomon Islands	0–1	Vanuatu
	Report	Tangis 72'

VFF Freshwater Stadium, Port Vila
Attendance: 5,000
Referee: Veer Singh (Fiji)

18 June 2024
15:00

New Zealand	3–0	Solomon Islands
Waine 6', 11'; Barbarouses 45+4'	Report

VFF Freshwater Stadium, Port Vila
Attendance: 3,000
Referee: David Yareboinen (Papua New Guinea)
18 June 2024
15:00

Vanuatu	Cancelled	New Caledonia

VFF Freshwater Stadium, Port Vila

21 June 2024
12:00

New Caledonia	Cancelled	Solomon Islands

VFF Freshwater Stadium, Port Vila
21 June 2024
15:00

Vanuatu	0–4	New Zealand
	Report	Mata 10'; Kaltak 27' (o.g.); Just 63'; Old 78'

VFF Freshwater Stadium, Port Vila
Attendance: 7,200
Referee: Veer Singh (Fiji)

=== Group B ===
Pos	Team	Pld	W	D	L	GF	GA	GD	Pts	Qualification
1	Fiji (H)	3	3	0	0	15	2	+13	9	Advance to knockout stage
2	Tahiti	3	1	1	1	3	2	+1	4	Advance to knockout stage
3	Papua New Guinea	3	1	1	1	4	7	−3	4	
4	Samoa	3	0	0	3	2	13	−11	0	

Source: OFC
(H) Hosts
16 June 2024
13:00

Tahiti	2–0	Samoa
Degrumelle 4'; T. Tehau 28'	Report

HFC Bank Stadium, Suva
Attendance: 500
Referee: Ben Aukwai (Solomon Islands)
16 June 2024
16:00

Papua New Guinea	1–5	Fiji
Semmy 88'	Report	Begg 2'; Dunn 43', 52'; A. Komolong 55' (o.g.); Krishna 64'

HFC Bank Stadium, Suva
Attendance: 1,700
Referee: Calvin Berg (New Zealand)

19 June 2024
16:00

Papua New Guinea	1–1	Tahiti
Paul 25'	Report	Degrumelle 15'

HFC Bank Stadium, Suva
Attendance: 500
Referee: Campbell-Kirk Kawana-Waugh (New Zealand)
19 June 2024
19:00

Samoa	1–9	Fiji
Salisbury 47'	Report	Hughes 3', 61'; Dunn 38'; Krishna 45+3' (pen.), 53' (pen.); Baravilala 64'; Begg 67'; Dogalau 83', 89'

HFC Bank Stadium, Suva
Attendance: 1,300
Referee: Calvin Berg (New Zealand)

22 June 2024
16:00

Samoa	1–2	Papua New Guinea
Trainor 67'	Report	Semmy 26'; Kepo 47'

HFC Bank Stadium, Suva
Attendance: 500
Referee: Ben Aukwai (Solomon Islands)
22 June 2024
19:00

Fiji	1–0	Tahiti
Krishna 26' (pen.)	Report

HFC Bank Stadium, Suva
Attendance: 1,500
Referee: Campbell-Kirk Kawana-Waugh (New Zealand)

== Knockout stage ==
In the knockout stage, if a match was level at the end of normal playing time, extra time was played (two periods of 15 minutes each). If still tied after extra time, the match was decided by a penalty shoot-out.

=== Bracket ===
Semi-finals
27 June – Port Vila
New Zealand	5
Tahiti	0
27 June – Port Vila
Fiji	1
Vanuatu	2

Final
30 June – Port Vila
New Zealand	3
Vanuatu	0
Third place play-off
30 June – Port Vila
Tahiti	2
Fiji	1

=== Semi-finals ===
27 June 2024
11:00

New Zealand	5–0	Tahiti
Surman 7'; Waine 45', 53'; Barbarouses 45+3', 72'	Report

VFF Freshwater Stadium, Port Vila
Attendance: 2,000
Referee: Veer Singh (Fiji)

27 June 2024
15:00

Fiji	1–2	Vanuatu
Cavuilagi 46'	Report	Spokeyjack 12'; Thomas 56'

VFF Freshwater Stadium, Port Vila
Attendance: 5,200
Referee: Campbell-Kirk Kawana-Waugh (New Zealand)

=== Third place play-off ===
30 June 2024
11:00

Tahiti	2–1	Fiji
T. Tehau 72', 83'	Report	Krishna 58'

VFF Freshwater Stadium, Port Vila
Attendance: 3,000
Referee: Campbell-Kirk Kawana-Waugh (New Zealand)

=== Final ===
30 June 2024
15:00

New Zealand	3–0	Vanuatu
Howieson 2'; Randall 83'; Mata 90+1'	Report

VFF Freshwater Stadium, Port Vila
Attendance: 10,000
Referee: Ben Aukwai (Solomon Islands)

== Statistics ==
=== Goalscorers ===
There were 46 goals scored in 13 matches, for an average of 3.54 goals per match.

5 goals

- (Fiji) Roy Krishna

4 goals

- (New Zealand) Ben Waine

3 goals

- (Fiji) Thomas Dunn
- (New Zealand) Kosta Barbarouses
- (French Polynesia) Teaonui Tehau

2 goals

- (Fiji) Nabil Begg
- (Fiji) Etonia Dogalau
- (Fiji) Setareki Hughes
- (New Zealand) Max Mata
- (Papua New Guinea) Tommy Semmy
- (French Polynesia) Matéo Degrumelle

1 goal

- (Fiji) Filipe Baravilala
- (Fiji) Sitiveni Cavuilagi
- (New Zealand) Cameron Howieson
- (New Zealand) Elijah Just
- (New Zealand) Ben Old
- (New Zealand) Jesse Randall
- (New Zealand) Finn Surman
- (Papua New Guinea) Ati Kepo
- (Papua New Guinea) Pala Paul
- (Samoa) Luke Salisbury
- (Samoa) Pharrell Trainor
- (Vanuatu) Johnathan Spokeyjack
- (Vanuatu) Kensi Tangis
- (Vanuatu) Jason Thomas

1 own goal

- (Papua New Guinea) Alwin Komolong (against Fiji)
- (Vanuatu) Brian Kaltak (against New Zealand)

=== Awards ===
Award	Player/Team
Golden Ball	(gold) (New Zealand) Liberato Cacace; (silver) (New Zealand) Kosta Barbarouses; (bronze) (Vanuatu) Kensi Tangis
Golden Boot	(gold) (Fiji) Roy Krishna; (silver) (New Zealand) Ben Waine; (bronze) (New Zealand) Kosta Barbarouses
Best Young Player	(New Zealand) Finn Surman
Golden Glove	(New Zealand) Max Crocombe
Fair Play Award	New Zealand

=== Man of the match ===
Match	Round	Team 1	Result	Team 2	Man of the match	Ref.
Group stage
1	Group A	Solomon Islands	0–1	Vanuatu	(Vanuatu) Brian Kaltak	
3	Group B	Tahiti	2–0	Samoa	(French Polynesia) Teaonui Tehau	
2	Group B	Papua New Guinea	1–5	Fiji	(Fiji) Thomas Dunn	
4	Group A	New Zealand	3–0	Solomon Islands	(New Zealand) Alex Rufer	
5	Group B	Papua New Guinea	1–1	Tahiti	(Papua New Guinea) Ati Kepo	
6	Group B	Samoa	1–9	Fiji	(Fiji) Setareki Hughes	
7	Group A	Vanuatu	0–4	New Zealand	(New Zealand) Elijah Just	
8	Group B	Samoa	1–2	Papua New Guinea	(Papua New Guinea) Alwin Komolong	
9	Group B	Fiji	1–0	Tahiti	(French Polynesia) Pothin Poma	
Knockout stage
10	Semi-finals	New Zealand	5–0	Tahiti	(New Zealand) Liberato Cacace	
11	Semi-finals	Fiji	1–2	Vanuatu	(Vanuatu) Johnathan Spokeyjack	
12	Third place play-off	Tahiti	2–1	Fiji	(French Polynesia) Teaonui Tehau	
13	Final	New Zealand	3–0	Vanuatu	(New Zealand) Liberato Cacace	

== Marketing ==
=== Broadcasting rights ===
On 28 February 2024, Oceania Football Confederation (OFC) announced that all OFC competitions in the 2024–2025 season, including the 2024 OFC Men's Nations Cup, would be streamed by FIFA+.

Country	Broadcaster	Ref.
World	FIFA+	
