= List of foreign Ligue 1 players: N =

This is a list of foreign players in the French Ligue 1, which commenced play in 1932. The following players must meet both of the following two criteria:

1. Have played at least one Ligue 1 game. Players who were signed by Ligue 1 clubs, but only played in lower league, cup and/or European games, or did not play in any competitive games at all, are not included.
2. Are considered foreign, i.e., outside France and its dependencies (Guadeloupe, Martinique, Reunion Island or French Polynesia), determined by the following:

A player is considered foreign if he is not eligible to play for the national teams of France.

More specifically,

- If a player has been capped on international level, the national team is used; if he has been capped by more than one country, the highest level (or the most recent) team is used. These include French players with dual citizenship. Players who played for France but came as foreign players (such as Miguel Ángel Lauri) are also listed.
- If a player has not been capped on international level, his country of birth is used, except those who were born abroad from French parents or moved to France at a young age, and those who clearly indicated to have switched his nationality to another nation.

Clubs listed are those that the player has played at least one Ligue 1 game for.

Seasons listed are those that the player has played at least one Ligue 1 game in. Note that seasons, not calendar years, are used. For example, "1992–95" indicates that the player has played in every season from 1992–93 to 1994–95, but not necessarily every calendar year from 1992 to 1995.

In bold: players still active in Ligue 1 and their respective teams in current season.

== Netherlands ==
- Edwin van Ankeren – Guingamp – 2000–01
- Bram Appel – Reims – 1949–54
- Beb Bakhuys – Metz – 1937–39
- Mitchel Bakker – Paris SG, Lille – 2019–21, 2024–25
- Mitchell van Bergen – Reims – 2021–23
- Marco Bizot – Brest – 2021–25
- Myron Boadu – Monaco – 2021–24
- Ilan Boccara – Evian – 2013–14
- Hendrick den Boer – FC Nancy – 1950–51
- Piet den Boer – Bordeaux, Caen – 1989–91
- **Branco van den Boomen** – Toulouse, **Angers** – 2022–23, 2025–
- Peter Bosz – Toulon – 1988–91
- Sven Botman – Lille – 2020–22
- Joep Brandes – Nîmes, Montpellier – 1950–51, 1952–53
- Bart Carlier – Strasbourg, Monaco – 1954–55, 1958–64
- Thijs Dallinga – Toulouse – 2022–24
- Memphis Depay – Lyon – 2016–21
- Dick van Dijk – Nice – 1972–74
- Javairô Dilrosun – Bordeaux – 2021–22
- Lee-Roy Echteld – Cannes – 1997–98
- Anwar El Ghazi – Lille – 2017–18
- Emanuel Emegha – Strasbourg – 2023–26
- Edwin Gorter – Caen – 1991–93
- Heinz van Haaren – Strasbourg – 1972–73
- Lambertus de Harder – Bordeaux – 1949–54, 1955–56
- Cor van der Hart – Lille – 1950–55
- Hans Hateboer – Rennes, Lyon – 2024–26
- Jos van Herpen – Brest – 1989–91
- Ki-Jana Hoever – Auxerre – 2024–25
- Cas Janssens – Nîmes – 1973–74
- Jerry de Jong – Caen – 1994–95
- Wim Kieft – Bordeaux – 1990–91
- Ricardo Kishna – Lille – 2016–17
- Kees Kist – Paris SG – 1982–83
- Jan Klijnjan – Sochaux – 1973–77
- Justin Kluivert – Nice – 2021–22
- Patrick Kluivert – Lille – 2007–08
- **Ruben Kluivert** – **Lyon** – 2025–
- Terence Kongolo – Monaco – 2017–18
- Adick Koot – Cannes – 1991–92, 1993–98
- Cees van Kooten – Lille – 1971–72
- Jan de Kubber – Bordeaux – 1950–56
- Tscheu La Ling – Marseille – 1984–85
- Rajiv van La Parra – Caen – 2008–09
- John Lammers – Toulon – 1988–90
- **Jeffrey de Lange** – **Marseille** – 2025–
- Wilhelm van Lent – Lille, Lens – 1949–50, 1951–54
- Willem Letemahulu – Brest – 1979–80
- Eros Maddy – Auxerre – 2024–25
- Azor Matusiwa – Reims, Rennes – 2021–25
- Mario Melchiot – Rennes – 2006–07
- Stanley Menzo – Bordeaux – 1997
- Kiki Musampa – Bordeaux – 1997–99
- Arnold Oosterveer – Rennes, Valenciennes – 1990–93
- Tarik Oulida – Sedan – 2002–03
- Patrick Paauwe – Valenciennes – 2006–07
- Erik Pieters – Amiens – 2018–19
- Jan Poortvliet – Cannes – 1988–89
- Karim Rekik – Marseille – 2015–17
- Johnny Rep – Bastia, Saint-Étienne – 1977–83
- Petrus van Rhijn – Valenciennes, Stade Français – 1956–58, 1959–60
- Wim Rijsbergen – Bastia – 1978–79
- Kees Rijvers – Saint-Étienne, Stade Français – 1950–54, 1955–57, 1960–62
- Johannes Rohrig – CO Roubaix-Tourcoing – 1952–53
- Philippe Sandler – Troyes – 2021–22
- Marinus Schapp – RC Paris – 1952–53
- Kaj Sierhuis – Reims – 2019–23
- Sonny Silooy – RC Paris – 1988–89
- Xavi Simons – Paris SG – 2020–22
- Wesley Sneijder – Nice – 2017–18
- Stijn Spierings – Toulouse, Lens – 2022–24
- Piet Steenbergen – Le Havre – 1950–51
- Maarten Stekelenburg – Monaco – 2014–15
- Calvin Stengs – Nice – 2021–23
- Joop Stoffelen – RC Paris – 1950–51
- Kevin Strootman – Marseille – 2018–21
- Wim Suurbier – Metz – 1978–79
- Theodorus Suurendonk – Monaco – 1971–72
- Wilbert Suvrijn – Montpellier HSC – 1989–93
- Kenny Tete – Lyon – 2017–20
- **Jordan Teze** – **Monaco** – 2024–
- Quinten Timber – Marseille – 2025–27
- Theodorus Timmermans – Nîmes – 1950–53
- Gerald Vanenburg – Cannes – 1997–98
- Lambert Verdonk – Marseille, Ajaccio – 1971–73
- John Verhoek – Rennes – 2010–11
- Frank Verlaat – Auxerre – 1992–95
- Arjan Vermeulen – Nice – 1996–97
- Pierre Vermeulen – Paris SG – 1985–87
- Henk Vos – Metz, Sochaux – 1990–91, 1993–95
- Arie de Vroet – Le Havre – 1950–52
- Gregory van der Wiel – Paris SG – 2012–16
- Georginio Wijnaldum – Paris SG – 2021–22
- Richard Witschge – Bordeaux – 1993–94, 1995–96
- Rob Witschge – Saint-Étienne – 1989–90
- Ricky van Wolfswinkel – Saint-Étienne – 2014–15
- Boudewijn Zenden – Marseille – 2007–09

== New Caledonia ==
- Angelo Fulgini – Angers, Lens – 2017–25
- Georges Gope-Fenepej – Troyes, Amiens – 2012–13, 2017–18
- Wesley Lautoa – Lorient, Dijon – 2011–21

== New Zealand ==
- Ben Old – Saint-Étienne – 2024–25
- Bill Tuiloma – Marseille – 2014–15

== Niger ==
- Seybou Koita – Amiens – 2017–18
- Hervé Lybohy – Nîmes – 2018–19
- Moussa Maâzou – AS Monaco, Bordeaux – 2009–11

== Nigeria ==
- Akor Adams – Montpellier – 2023–25
- Olubayo Adefemi – Boulogne – 2009–10
- Rabiu Afolabi – Sochaux – 2005–09
- Victor Agali – Marseille, Nice – 1996–97, 2004–05
- Uche Agbo – Montpellier – 1997–98
- Onyekachi Apam – Nice – 2006–10
- Chidozie Awaziem – Nantes – 2017–18, 2025–26
- Tosin Dosunmu – Nancy – 2006–07
- Elderson Echiéjilé – Rennes, AS Monaco – 2007–09, 2014–16
- Edorisi Ekhosuehi – Le Mans – 2005–06
- Joseph Enakarhire – Bordeaux – 2006–07
- Vincent Enyeama – Lille – 2013–18
- Lukman Haruna – AS Monaco – 2008–10
- Hafiz Umar Ibrahim – Reims – 2024–25
- Brown Ideye – Sochaux – 2009–11
- Victor Ikpeba – AS Monaco – 1993–99
- George Ilenikhena – Monaco – 2024–26
- Bonke Innocent – Lorient – 2021–24
- Sani Kaita – AS Monaco – 2008–09
- Samuel Kalu – Bordeaux – 2018–22
- Stephen Keshi – Strasbourg – 1992–93
- **Josh Maja** – Bordeaux, **Le Havre** – 2018–22, 2026–
- Terem Moffi – Lorient, Nice – 2020–26
- **Tochukwu Nnadi** – **Marseille** – 2025–
- Dickson Nwakaeme – Angers – 2016–17
- Peter Odemwingie – Lille – 2004–07
- Bartholomew Ogbeche – Paris SG, Bastia, Metz – 2001–05
- Hamzat Ojediran – Lens – 2024–25
- Jay-Jay Okocha – Paris SG – 1998–02
- Godwin Okpara – Strasbourg, Paris SG – 1996–2001
- Egutu Oliseh – AS Nancy – 1998–2000
- Henry Onyekuru – Monaco – 2019–21
- Victor Orakpo – Nice – 2024–25
- Gift Orban – Lyon – 2023–25
- Wilson Oruma – Lens, AS Nancy, Sochaux, Marseille – 1994–98, 2002–08
- Gabriel Osho – Auxerre – 2024–25
- Victor Osimhen – Lille – 2019–20
- Ricky Owubokiri – Laval, Metz – 1986–89
- Nduka Ozokwo – Nice – 2008–09
- Samson Siasia – Nantes – 1993–95
- **Moses Simon** – Nantes, **Paris FC** – 2019–
- Taye Taiwo – Marseille – 2004–11
- Kalu Uche – Bordeaux – 2004–05
- John Utaka – Lens, Rennes – 2002–07, 2011–13
- Ejike Uzoenyi – Rennes – 2012–13
- Taribo West – Auxerre – 1993–97
- Joseph Yobo – Marseille – 2001–02
- Simon Zenke – Strasbourg – 2007–08

== North Macedonia ==
- Kiril Dojčinovski – Troyes – 1974–76
- Sokrat Mojsov – Rennes – 1971–73
- Spasoje Nikolić – RC Paris, Rennes – 1946–49, 1951–53
- Robert Popov – Auxerre – 2008–10
- Vlatko Stojanovski – Nîmes – 2019–21

== Northern Ireland ==
- Phil Gray – AS Nancy – 1996–97
- Michael Hughes – Strasbourg – 1992–95
- George O'Boyle – Bordeaux – 1988–89

== Norway ==
- Haitam Aleesami – Amiens – 2019–20
- Willy Andresen – Stade Français – 1951
- Patrick Berg – Lens – 2021–22
- Daniel Braaten – Toulouse – 2008–13
- Marius Broholm – Lille – 2025–26
- John Carew – Lyon – 2005–07
- **Aron Dønnum** – **Toulouse** – 2023–
- Dan Eggen – Le Mans – 2003–04
- Hassan El Fakiri – AS Monaco – 2002–05
- Per Figved – Sochaux – 1950–51
- Geir Frigård – Sedan – 1999–2000
- Ruben Gabrielsen – Toulouse – 2019–20
- Stian Gregersen – Bordeaux – 2021–22
- Kjetil Haug – Toulouse – 2024–26
- Thorstein Helstad – Le Mans – 2008–10
- Noah Holm – Reims – 2022–23
- Warren Kamanzi – Toulouse – 2022–26
- Joshua King – Toulouse – 2024–25
- Anders Konradsen – Rennes – 2012–15
- Bjørn Tore Kvarme – Saint-Étienne, Bastia – 1999–2001, 2004–05
- Birger Meling – Nîmes, Rennes – 2020–24
- Georg Monsen – FC Nancy – 1950
- Joel Mvuka – Lorient – 2023–24, 2025–26
- Thøger Nordbø – Club Français – 1932–33
- Ousman Nyan – Ajaccio – 2002–03
- Hans Nylund – RC Paris – 1959–60
- Arne Larsen Økland – RC Paris – 1984–85
- **Fredrik Oppegård** – **Auxerre** – 2024–
- Leo Østigård – Rennes – 2024–25
- Inge Paulsen – Sochaux – 1950
- Harald Pettersen – Sochaux – 1938–39
- Kjetil Rekdal – Rennes – 1996–97
- John Arne Riise – AS Monaco – 1998–2001
- Ole Selnæs – Saint-Étienne – 2016–19
- **Egil Selvik** – **Brest** – 2026–
- Alexander Søderlund – Saint-Étienne – 2015–18
- Gunnar Stensland – FC Nancy – 1949–50
- Fredrik Strømstad – Le Mans – 2008–10
- Alexander Tettey – Rennes – 2009–12
- Torgeir Torgersen – Stade Français – 1950–51

== References and notes ==
=== Books ===
- Barreaud, Marc (1998). Dictionnaire des footballeurs étrangers du championnat professionnel français (1932-1997). L'Harmattan, Paris. ISBN 2-7384-6608-7.
- Tamás Dénes; Pál Peterdi; Zoltán Rochy; József Selmeci (1999). Kalandozó magyar labdarúgók. ISBN 963-85967-0-8.

=== Club pages ===
- AJ Auxerre former players
- AJ Auxerre former players
- Girondins de Bordeaux former players
- Girondins de Bordeaux former players
- Les ex-Tangos (joueurs), Stade Lavallois former players
- Olympique Lyonnais former players
- Olympique de Marseille former players
- FC Metz former players
- AS Monaco FC former players
- Ils ont porté les couleurs de la Paillade... Montpellier HSC Former players
- AS Nancy former players
- FC Nantes former players
- Paris SG former players
- Red Star Former players
- Red Star former players
- Stade de Reims former players
- Stade Rennais former players
- CO Roubaix-Tourcoing former players
- AS Saint-Étienne former players
- Sporting Toulon Var former players

=== Others ===
- stat2foot
- footballenfrance
- French Clubs' Players in European Cups 1955-1995, RSSSF
- Finnish players abroad, RSSSF
- Italian players abroad, RSSSF
- Romanians who played in foreign championships
- Swiss players in France, RSSSF
- EURO 2008 CONNECTIONS: FRANCE, Stephen Byrne Bristol Rovers official site

== Notes ==
1. Born in the Democratic Republic of Congo (then Zaïre)
2. Born in Denmark
3. Born in England
4. Born in Indonesia (then part of the Dutch East Indies)
5. Born in France
6. Born in Gambia
7. Born in Germany
8. Born in Ghana
9. Born in Greece
10. Born in Morocco
11. Born in Suriname
12. Born in Switzerland
13. Born in Uzbekistan (then part of the Soviet Union)
