= Jared Clark =

Vanuatuan association football player (born 1998)

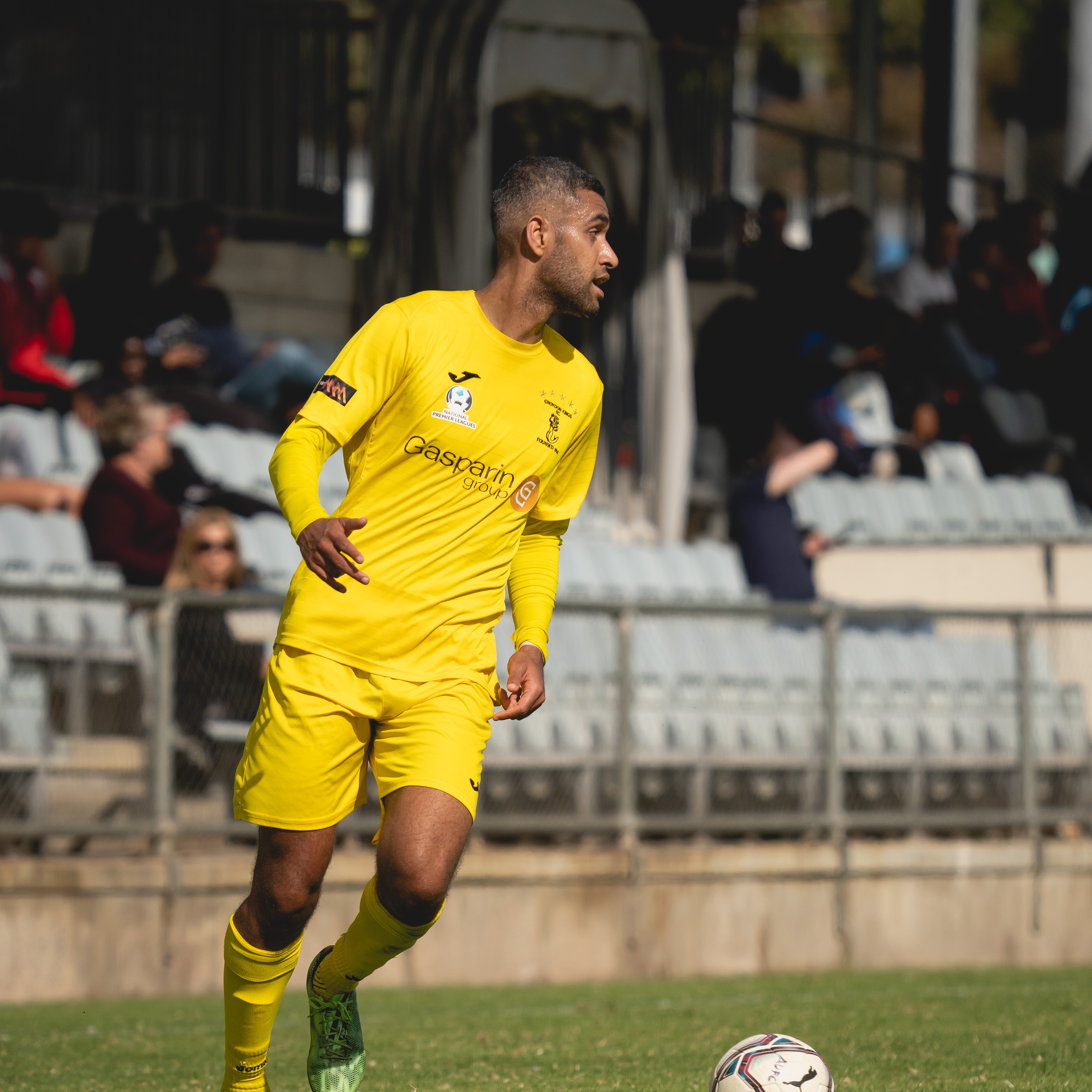

Personal information
- Date of birth: 21 January 1998 (age 28)
- Place of birth: Adelaide, Australia
- Height: 1.90 m (6 ft 3 in)
- Position: Centre-back

Team information
- Current team: FK Beograd

Youth career
- Western Strikers
- Adelaide City
- 2013–2014: White City
- 2014–2017: Vojvodina
- 2017–2019: Adelaide United

Senior career*
Years	Team	Apps	(Gls)
2018–2019	Adelaide United NPL	24	(1)
2019–2022	Croydon Kings	76	(2)
2023–	FK Beograd	40	(2)

International career^{‡}
2022–	Vanuatu	9	(0)
Medal record
Men's football
Representing Vanuatu
OFC Nations Cup
Runner-up	2024 Fiji/Vanuatu
- * Club domestic league appearances and goals as of 19 September 2024 ‡ National team caps and goals as of 18 November 2024

Jared Clark (born 21 January 1998) is a footballer who plays as a centre-back for FK Beograd. Born in Australia, he plays for the Vanuatu national team.

== Club career ==
Clark is a youth product of the Australian clubs Western Strikers, Adelaide City and White City. He moved to Serbia with Vojvodina, and after three years in the country returned to Australia with Adelaide United. In 2019, he began his senior career with the semi-pro club Croydon Kings.

== International career ==
Clark was born in Australia, and has Ni-Vanuatu descent through his mother. He was first called up to the preliminary 2020 OFC Nations Cup squad for Vanuatu national team, but the tournament was cancelled due to COVID-19. He debuted with Vanuatu in a friendly 3–0 loss to Fiji on 10 March 2022.

== Honours ==
=== Player ===
Vanuatu

- OFC Nations Cup: runner-up 2024
