= Jason Thomas (footballer) =

Vanuatuan footballer (born 1997)

Personal information
- Full name: Jason Thomas
- Date of birth: 20 January 1997 (age 29)
- Place of birth: Vanuatu
- Height: 1.90 m (6 ft 3 in)
- Position: Centre back

Team information
- Current team: Vanuatu United

Senior career*
Years	Team	Apps	(Gls)
2012–2013	Erakor Golden Star		
2013	Nayland College		
2013–2015	Erakor Golden Star		
2015	Phnom Penh Crown	6	(1)
2016–2017	Erakor Golden Star		
2017–2018	Solomon Warriors		
2018	Erakor Golden Star		
2019–2025	Hekari United		
2026–	Vanuatu United	0	(0)

International career^{‡}
2013	Vanuatu U17	5	(2)
2014–2017	Vanuatu U20	9	(1)
2015–	Vanuatu	26	(1)
Medal record
Men's football
Representing Vanuatu
OFC Nations Cup
Runner-up	2024 Fiji/Vanuatu
OFC U-20 Championship
Runner-up	2014 Fiji
Runner-up	2016 Tonga/Vanuatu
Pacific Mini Games
Gold medal – first place	2017 Vanuatu
- * Club domestic league appearances and goals as of 15 June 2019 ‡ National team caps and goals as of 27 June 2024

Jason Thomas (born 20 January 1997) is a Vanuatuan footballer who plays as a defender for Vanuatu United and the Vanuatu national team. He made his debut for the national team in November 2015 in their 1–1 draw with Fiji. Besides Vanuatu, he has played in Solomon Islands, Fiji, New Zealand, Papua New Guinea, and Cambodia.

== Club career ==
In 2013, he joined Nayland College.

In 2015, he signed for Phnom Penh Crown.

In 2017, he signed for Solomon Warriors.

In 2020, he signed for Lautoka after receiving interest from Ba.

== International career ==
Prior to his 2015 debut against Fiji for the senior national team, Thomas previously featured five times for the U-17 team at the 2013 OFC U-17 Championship where he scored twice, once salvaging a draw in their opening match against Papua New Guinea and once in a 3–1 victory against New Caledonia in their final group match.

He was later called up to the Vanuatu national under-20 football team for the 2014 OFC U-20 Championship, where he played in four matches: a 1–0 victory over New Caledonia, a 0–0 draw with the Solomon Islands in the following group match, a 4–0 victory over American Samoa, where he was named as captain and a 2–2 draw with Fiji.

In 2016 Thomas participated with the Vanuatu under-20 team in the 2016 OFC U-20 Championship. Vanuatu reached a second place which meant they qualified for the 2017 FIFA U-20 World Cup.

== Career statistics ==
=== International ===
As of match played 30 June 2024

Appearances and goals by national team and year
National team	Year	Apps	Goals
Vanuatu	2015	2	0
Vanuatu	2016	4	0
Vanuatu	2017	5	0
Vanuatu	2019	5	0
Vanuatu	2022	2	0
Vanuatu	2023	5	0
Vanuatu	2024	4	1
Total		27	1

Scores and results list Vanuatu's goal tally first, score column indicates score after each Thomas goal.

List of international goals scored by Jason Thomas
No.	Date	Venue	Opponent	Score	Result	Competition	Ref.
1	27 June 2024	Freshwater Stadium, Port Vila, Vanuatu	Fiji	2–1	2–1	2024 OFC Men's Nations Cup	

== Honours ==
Vanuatu

- OFC Nations Cup: Runner-up,2024
- Pacific Mini Games: Gold Medalist, 2017

Vanuatu U20

- OFC U-20 Championship: Runner-up, 2014, 2016
