= Nabil Begg =

Fijian footballer (born 2004)

Personal information
- Full name: Nabil Mohammed Begg
- Date of birth: 17 March 2004 (age 22)
- Place of birth: Sorokoba, Fiji
- Height: 1.80 m (5 ft 11 in)
- Position: Midfielder

Team information
- Current team: Bula FC

Youth career
- Ba

Senior career*
Years	Team	Apps	(Gls)
2021–2024	Ba	35	(9)
2024–2025	Auckland City	0	(0)
2025	Ba	11	(1)
2026–	Bula FC	1	(1)

International career^{‡}
2022	Fiji U19	5	(2)
2023	Fiji U20	6	(0)
2023–	Fiji U23	4	(0)
2022–	Fiji	13	(4)
Medal record
Men's football
Representing Fiji
OFC U-19 Championship
Runner-up	2022 Tahiti
Pacific Games
Bronze medal – third place	2023 Solomon Islands
MSG Prime Minister's Cup
Winner	2026 Fiji
Runner-up	2024 Solomon Islands
- * Club domestic league appearances and goals as of 1 March 2024 ‡ National team caps and goals as of 30 June 2024

Nabil Mohammed Begg (born 17 March 2004) is a Fijian footballer who plays as a midfielder for OFC Professional League club Bula FC and the Fiji national team.

== Club career ==
Begg is a youth academy graduate of Ba. On 24 October 2021, he scored his first goal for the club in a 2–1 league win against Suva.

In November 2022, Begg scored the only goal in the final of the Pacific Community Cup, helping Ba clinch the trophy for the first time. In early 2024, he completed a move to Auckland City FC in New Zealand.

== International career ==
In February 2022, Begg was named in Fiji squad for 2022 FIFA World Cup qualification tournament. He made his international debut on 10 March 2022 in a 3–0 friendly win against Vanuatu.

== Career statistics ==
=== International ===
As of 30 June 2024

Appearances and goals by national team and year
National team	Year	Apps	Goals
Fiji	2022	2	0
Fiji	2023	4	2
Fiji	2024	7	2
Total		13	4

Scores and results list Fiji's goal tally first, score column indicates score after each Begg goal.

List of international goals scored by Nabil Begg
No.	Date	Venue	Opponent	Score	Result	Competition
1	18 November 2023	SIFF Academy Field, Honiara, Solomon Islands	Northern Mariana Islands	1–0	10–0	2023 Pacific Games
2	1 December 2023	Lawson Tama Stadium, Honiara, Solomon Islands	Vanuatu	3–2	4–2	2023 Pacific Games
3	16 June 2024	HFC Bank Stadium, Suva, Fiji	Papua New Guinea	1–0	5–1	2024 OFC Men's Nations Cup
4	19 June 2024	HFC Bank Stadium, Suva, Fiji	Samoa	7–1	9–1	2024 OFC Men's Nations Cup

== Honours ==
Fiji

- Pacific Games: Bronze Medalist, 2023
- MSG Prime Minister's Cup:2026; Runner-up, 2024

Fiji U20

- OFC U-19 Championship: Runner-up, 2019
