= Thomas Dunn (footballer, born 2003) =

Fijian footballer

Personal information
- Full name: Thomas Arthur Josua Dunn
- Date of birth: 19 January 2003 (age 23)
- Place of birth: Navua, Fiji
- Height: 1.63 m (5 ft 4 in)
- Position: Midfielder

Team information
- Current team: Navua
- Number: 6

Youth career
- –2019: Navua

Senior career*
Years	Team	Apps	(Gls)
2019–2021	Navua	26	(2)
2022	Frankston Pines	18	(3)
2023–2025	Navua	19	(4)
2025	Eastern Suburbs	15	(0)
2026	Bula FC	12	(2)
2026–	Navua	3	(0)

International career^{‡}
2018	Fiji U17	4	(0)
2023	Fiji U20	3	(0)
2023–	Fiji	25	(7)
Medal record
Men's football
Representing Fiji
Pacific Games
Bronze medal – third place	2023 Solomon Islands
MSG Prime Minister's Cup
Winner	2026 Fiji
Runner-up	2024 Solomon Islands
- * Club domestic league appearances and goals as of 13 February 2026 ‡ National team caps and goals as of 20 November 2025

Thomas Arthur Josua Dunn (born 19 January 2003) is a Fijian professional footballer who plays as a midfielder for Navua and for Fiji national football team.

== Club career ==
The son of fishermen born in Togoru, Navua, Dunn is a player who started his career with Navua FC, and at the age of 16 he joined the Fijian youth teams, most notably for the squad that represented the country in the 2023 FIFA U-20 World Cup. For clubs level, he played for Navua FC and had a spell at Australian club Frankston Pines FC in the 2022 season, returning to Navua FC in 2023.

On 5 February 2025, Eastern Suburbs announced Dunn had signed alongside fellow Fijian Sterling Vasconcellos, for the 2025 season.

On 8 December 2025, Dunn signed for OFC Professional League club Bula FC on a one-year deal valid for the 2026 season; he signed again alongside Sterling Vasconcellos.

== International career ==
At international level, Thomas Dunn began his participation in 2023, being part of the Football squad at the 2023 Pacific Games. In 2024, he was called up again, this time to participate in the 2024 OFC Nations Cup.

== Style of play ==
Even with his short stature, Dunn stands out for his mobility on the field, being identified as the key player for his club, Navua FC, which has played in the Fiji Premier League since 2019.

== Career statistics ==
As of 20 November 2025

Appearances and goals by national team and year
National team	Year	Apps	Goals
Fiji	2023	3	3
Fiji	2024	16	4
Fiji	2025	6	0
Total		25	7

Scores and results list Fiji's goal tally first.

List of international goals scored by Thomas Dunn
No.	Date	Venue	Opponent	Score	Result	Competition
1.	18 November 2023	SIFF Academy Field, Honiara, Solomon Islands	Northern Mariana Islands	9–0	10–0	2023 Pacific Games
2.	1 December 2023	Lawson Tama Stadium, Honiara, Solomon Islands	Vanuatu	1–0	4–2	Friendly
3.	1 December 2023	Lawson Tama Stadium, Honiara, Solomon Islands	Vanuatu	2–2	4–2	Friendly
4.	16 June 2024	HFC Bank Stadium, Suva, Fiji	Papua New Guinea	2–0	5–1	2024 OFC Nations Cup
5.	16 June 2024	HFC Bank Stadium, Suva, Fiji	Papua New Guinea	3–0	5–1	2024 OFC Nations Cup
6.	19 June 2024	HFC Bank Stadium, Suva, Fiji	Samoa	2–0	9–1	2024 OFC Nations Cup
7.	14 November 2024	PNG Football Stadium, Port Moresby, Papua New Guinea	Papua New Guinea	1–1	3–3	2026 FIFA World Cup qualification
8.	18 September 2026	HFC Bank Stadium, Suva, Fiji	Solomon Islands	3–1	3–3	2026 MSG Prime Minister's Cup
9.	3 October 2026	HFC Bank Stadium, Suva, Fiji	Vanuatu	1–0	1–0	2026 MSG Prime Minister's Cup

== Honours ==
Fiji

- Pacific Games: Bronze Medalist, 2023
- MSG Prime Minister's Cup: 2026; Runner-up, 2024
