= Max Mata =

New Zealand footballer (born 2000)

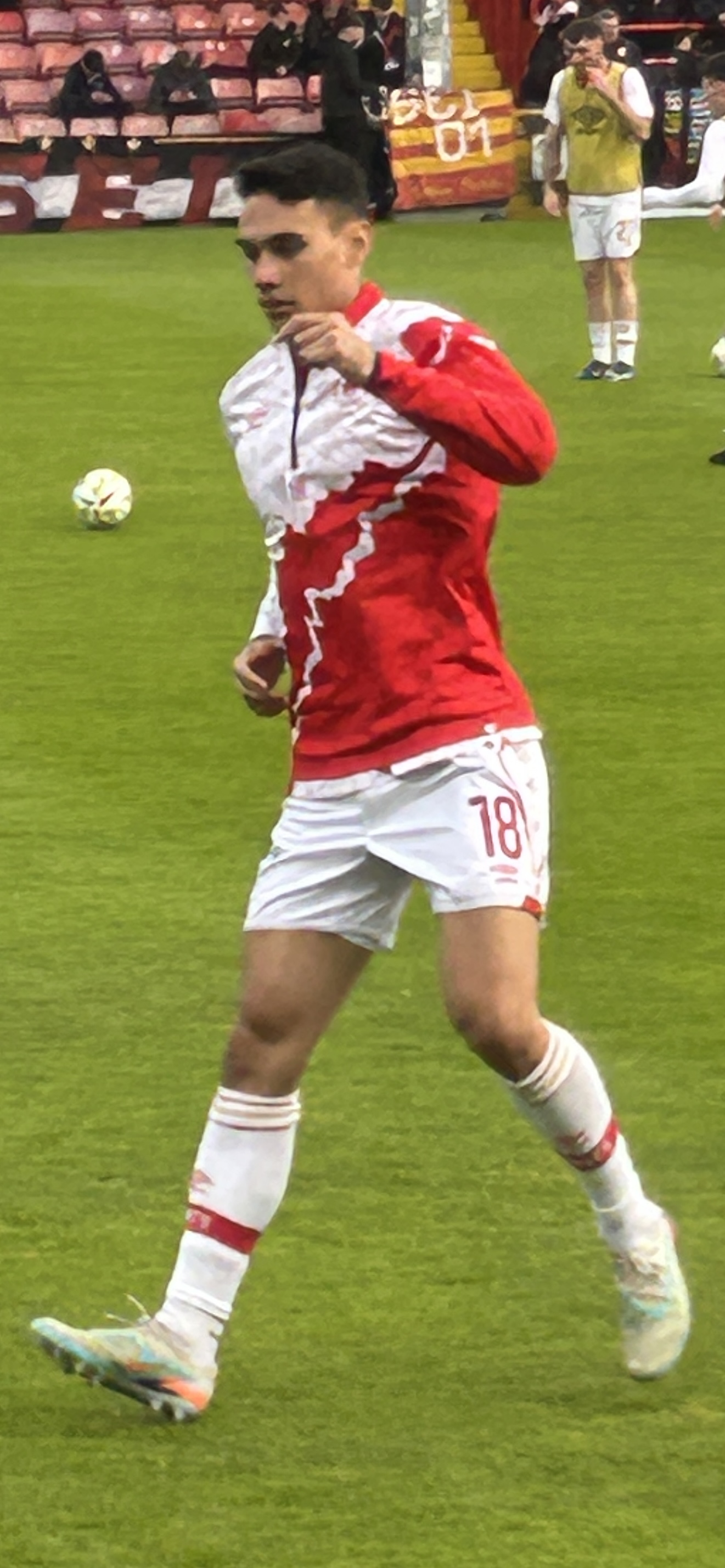
- Mata during a pre-match warmup with St Patrick's Athletic in 2026.

Personal information
- Full name: Max Andrew Mata
- Date of birth: 10 July 2000 (age 26)
- Place of birth: Auckland, New Zealand
- Height: 1.86 m (6 ft 1 in)
- Position: Forward

Youth career
- –2018: Onehunga Sports

Senior career*
Years	Team	Apps	(Gls)
2015–2017	Wellington Phoenix Reserves	16	(8)
2017–2018	Eastern Suburbs	18	(3)
2019–2020	Grasshoppers II	10	(5)
2019	→ Nõmme Kalju (loan)	14	(9)
2021–2022	Real Monarchs	19	(2)
2022–2023	Sligo Rovers	50	(18)
2023–2025	Shrewsbury Town	22	(1)
2024	→ Sligo Rovers (loan)	14	(4)
2024–2025	→ Auckland FC (loan)	19	(2)
2026	St Patrick's Athletic	14	(1)

International career^{‡}
2017	New Zealand U17	7	(5)
2018–2019	New Zealand U20	6	(5)
2019–	New Zealand	14	(2)
Medal record
Men's football
Representing New Zealand
OFC Nations Cup
Winner	2024 Fiji/Vanuatu
OFC U-19 Championship
Winner	2018 Cook Islands/Tahiti
OFC U-17 Championship
Winner	2017 Samoa/Tahiti
- * Club domestic league appearances and goals as of 12:33, 12 November 2026 (UTC) ‡ National team caps and goals as of 30 June 2024

Max Andrew Mata (born 10 July 2000) is a New Zealand professional footballer who plays as a forward most recently for League of Ireland Premier Division club St Patrick's Athletic and the New Zealand national team.

== Club career ==
=== New Zealand ===
After shining in New Zealand as the youngest goalscorer in the country's top-flight at 15, Mata travelled to Switzerland to train with Grasshoppers. After an impressive trial period, he signed for the club.

=== Grasshoppers ===
After scoring four goals in his first seven games for the reserves, he was loaned to Estonian side, Nõmme Kalju in 2019 to further his development in a first-team environment. Mata never established himself with Grasshopper's first-team.

==== Loan to Nõmme Kalju ====
After joining on loan, Mata made his professional debut for Nõmme Kalju in their 5–0 loss to Celtic in the UEFA Champions League second qualifying round on 24 July 2019. Mata would make 20 appearances for the club in all competitions, scoring 11 times.

=== Real Monarchs ===
Mata left Switzerland on a free transfer in December 2020 and signed for American second-tier side, Real Monarchs.

=== Sligo Rovers ===
On 15 February 2022, it was announced that Mata had signed for League of Ireland Premier Division club Sligo Rovers. He was named Sligo Rovers' Young Player of the Year in the same year. He finished the 2022 season with seven goals and four assists in sixteen appearances in the league, as well as scoring twice in the Europa Conference League. In July 2022, he signed a contract extension until at least the end of the 2024 season. In February 2023, he scored a hat-trick in a 3–2 win away to UCD at the UCD Bowl.

=== Shrewsbury Town ===
On 3 August 2023, Mata signed for League One club Shrewsbury Town on a three-year deal. Having returned from his loan spells at Sligo Rovers and Auckland FC, he started off pre-season well in July 2025, scoring in a 3–0 friendly win over Kidderminster Harriers, before suffering a hamstring injury that would keep him out of action an initial eight to ten weeks. On 1 September 2025, it was announced that Mata had left the club by mutual consent, having scored 1 goal in 26 appearances during his time there.

==== Loan to Sligo Rovers ====
On 15 February 2024, it was announced that Mata had returned to Sligo Rovers, on loan until the summer. He scored 4 goals in 14 appearances during his time back on loan with the club.

==== Loan to Auckland ====
On 3 June 2024, it was announced that Mata had joined newly formed A-League side Auckland FC on loan. On 18 January 2025, he scored his first A-League goal in a 3–0 win over Melbourne City. On 10 June 2025, the club announced that Mata would return to Shrewsbury Town after scoring 2 goals in 19 appearances during his loan spell at the club.

=== St Patrick's Athletic ===
On 1 December 2025, it was announced that Mata had signed for League of Ireland Premier Division club St Patrick's Athletic. On 6 March 2026, Mata scored his first goal for the club in a 3–2 Dublin Derby win away to Shelbourne, scoring a 92nd minute winner having replaced Ryan Edmondson from the bench in the 74th minute. After an injury hit season with the club that saw him make just 15 appearances in all competitions, it was announced on 2 November 2026 that Mata would be leaving the club following the end of his contract.

== International career ==
=== Youth ===
Mata was named in the New Zealand U-20 side for the 2019 FIFA U-20 World Cup. He was picked for the tournament even though he would be unavailable for the first two games of the tournament due to a red card that he picked up in the final of the OFC U-19 Championship qualifiers. Mata ended up making two appearances for the U-20s, first in the last group game against Uruguay, where he captained the team, and in the round of 16 penalty shootout loss to Colombia.

=== Senior ===
Mata made his international debut on 15 November 2019, coming on as a substitute for New Zealand in their 0–1 loss to Lithuania. After a long spell out of the national team, he earned a call up in March 2023 for two friendly fixtures against China, followed by another callup in June for friendlies against Sweden and Qatar.

== Personal life ==
Mata is of Māori and Cook Island Māori descent. His older brother, Benjamin, is a footballer playing for Wellington Olympic and the Cook Islands national team.

== Career statistics ==
=== Club ===
As of match played 19 June 2026

Appearances and goals by club, season and competition
Club	Season	League			National cup		League cup		Continental		Other		Total	
Club	Season	Division	Apps	Goals	Apps	Goals	Apps	Goals	Apps	Goals	Apps	Goals	Apps	Goals
Wellington Phoenix Reserves	2015–16	NZ Premiership	6	3	—		—		—		—		6	3
Wellington Phoenix Reserves	2016–17	NZ Premiership	10	5	—		—		—		—		10	5
Wellington Phoenix Reserves	Total		16	8	0	0	0	0	0	0	0	0	16	8
Eastern Suburbs	2016–17	NZ Premiership	2	0	0	0	—		—		—		2	0
Eastern Suburbs	2017–18	NZ Premiership	15	3	0	0	—		—		1 (Note: Appearance in the 2018 New Zealand Football Championship Finals Series)	0	16	3
Eastern Suburbs	Total		17	3	0	0	0	0	0	0	1	0	18	3
Grasshoppers II	2018–19	1. Liga	7	4	—		—		—		—		7	4
Grasshoppers II	2020–21	1. Liga	3	1	—		—		—		—		3	1
Grasshoppers II	Total		10	5	0	0	0	0	0	0	0	0	10	5
Nõmme Kalju (loan)	2019	Meistriliiga	14	9	2	2	—		4 (Note: 2 appearances in the UEFA Champions League; 2 appearances in the UEFA Europa League)	0	—		20	11
Real Monarchs	2021	USL Championship	19	2	—		—		—		—		19	2
Sligo Rovers	2022	LOI Premier Division	27	7	1	0	—		6 (Note: Appearances in the UEFA Europa Conference League)	2	—		34	9
Sligo Rovers	2023	LOI Premier Division	23	11	1	1	—		—		—		24	12
Sligo Rovers	Total		50	18	2	1	0	0	6	2	0	0	58	21
Shrewsbury Town	2023–24	EFL League One	22	1	2	0	0	0	—		2 (Note: Appearances in the EFL Trophy)	0	26	1
Shrewsbury Town	2024–25	EFL League One	0	0	—		—		—		—		0	0
Shrewsbury Town	2025–26	EFL League Two	0	0	—		0	0	—		0	0	0	0
Shrewsbury Town	Total		22	1	2	0	0	0	0	0	2	0	26	1
Sligo Rovers (loan)	2024	LOI Premier Division	14	4	—		—		—		—		14	4
Auckland FC (loan)	2024–25	A-League Men	19	2	—		—		—		0	0	19	2
St Patrick's Athletic	2026	LOI Premier Division	14	1	0	0	—		—		1 (Note: Appearances in the Leinster Senior Cup)	0	15	1
Career total			180	48	6	3	0	0	10	2	4	0	200	53

=== International ===
As of match played 30 June 2024

Appearances and goals by national team and year
National team	Year	Apps	Goals
New Zealand	2019	1	0
New Zealand	2020	0	0
New Zealand	2021	0	0
New Zealand	2022	0	0
New Zealand	2023	8	0
New Zealand	2024	5	2
Total		14	2

Scores and results list New Zealand's goal tally first, score column indicates score after each Mata goal.

List of international goals scored by Max Mata
No.	Date	Venue	Opponent	Score	Result	Competition
1	21 June 2024	VFF Freshwater Stadium, Port Vila, Vanuatu	Vanuatu	1–0	4–0	2024 OFC Nations Cup
2	30 June 2024	VFF Freshwater Stadium, Port Vila, Vanuatu	Vanuatu	3–0	3–0	2024 OFC Nations Cup

== Honours ==
Auckland FC

- A-League Premiership: 2024–25

New Zealand U17

- OFC U-17 Championship: 2017

New Zealand U19

- OFC U-19 Championship: 2018

New Zealand

- OFC Nations Cup: 2024

Individual

- OFC U-19 Men's Championship Golden Boot: 2018
