= Finn Surman =

New Zealand footballer (born 2003)

- Surman with the Portland Timbers in 2026

Personal information
- Full name: Finn Surman
- Date of birth: 23 September 2003 (age 23)
- Place of birth: Cardiff, Wales
- Height: 1.90 m (6 ft 3 in)
- Position: Central defender

Team information
- Current team: Portland Timbers
- Number: 20

Youth career
- Selwyn United
- Wellington Phoenix

Senior career*
Years	Team	Apps	(Gls)
2019	Selwyn United	1	(0)
2019–2023	Wellington Phoenix Reserves	20	(0)
2021	Lower Hutt City AFC	17	(1)
2021–2024	Wellington Phoenix	45	(1)
2024–	Portland Timbers	56	(1)

International career^{‡}
2022–2023	New Zealand U-20		
2023–	New Zealand Olympic	4	(0)
2023–	New Zealand	23	(4)
Medal record
Men's football
Representing New Zealand
OFC Nations Cup
Winner	2024 Fiji/Vanuatu
OFC U-19 Championship
Winner	2022 Tahiti
- * Club domestic league appearances and goals as of 16 August 2026 ‡ National team caps and goals as of 15 November 2026

Finn Surman (born 23 September 2003) is a professional footballer who plays as a centre-back for Major League Soccer club Portland Timbers. Born in Wales, he represents the New Zealand national team.

== Club career ==
=== Wellington Phoenix ===
In November 2021, Surman was one of three players who travelled to Australia to join Wellington Phoenix's senior A-League Men side, forced to play away from home due to travel restrictions imposed due to the COVID-19 pandemic in New Zealand. He made his debut for the Phoenix in a win over Western United in the 2021 FFA Cup on 7 December 2021.

Surman signed a professional contract with the Phoenix in February 2022. By April 2022, Surman was making regular appearances in the Phoenix's starting side.

=== Portland Timbers ===
On 20 July 2024, Surman was transferred to Major League Soccer side Portland Timbers for an undisclosed fee. Surman was the third Wellington Phoenix academy graduate to sign an offshore club deal. Surman signed a contract through the 2026 season, with a club option till 2027.

On 19 October 2024, Surman made his debut for the club, starting in a 1–1 draw against Seattle Sounders. On 16 August 2026, Surman scored his first goal for the club in a 2–1 defeat to Chicago Fire at Soldier Field.

== International career ==
Born in Wales and raised in New Zealand, he was eligible to play for either New Zealand or Wales.

On 5 June 2023, he was called up by New Zealand for the first time.

Surman was later announced to represent the All Whites in the 2024 Paris Olympics.

On 14 May 2026, Surman was included in New Zealand's 26-man roster for the 2026 FIFA World Cup. Because Wales did not qualify for the tournament, he was the only Welsh-born player to play at the tournament. On 21 June 2026, in the 15th minute of a World Cup group stage game against Egypt, Surman scored a headed corner goal to bring the All Whites their first World Cup lead at the halftime interval.

== Career statistics ==
=== Club ===
As of match played 16 August 2026

Club	Season	League			National cup (Note: Appearance(s) in Chatham Cup, Australia Cup, U.S. Open Cup)		League cup (Note: Appearance(s) in Leagues Cup)		Other		Total	
Club	Season	Division	Apps	Goals	Apps	Goals	Apps	Goals	Apps	Goals	Apps	Goals
Wellington Phoenix Reserves	2019–20	Premiership	1	0	—		—		—		1	0
Wellington Phoenix Reserves	2020–21	Premiership	10	0	—		—		—		10	0
Wellington Phoenix Reserves	2021	National League	—		—		—		2 (Note: Appearances in South Central Series)	0	2	0
Wellington Phoenix Reserves	2022	National League	4	0	—		—		—		4	0
Wellington Phoenix Reserves	2023	National League	3	0	—		—		—		3	0
Wellington Phoenix Reserves	Total		18	0	0	0	0	0	2	0	20	0
Lower Hutt City	2021	National League	17	1	3	0	—		—		20	1
Wellington Phoenix	2021–22	A-League Men	14	0	3	0	—		1 (Note: Appearances in A-League Finals)	0	18	0
Wellington Phoenix	2022–23	A-League Men	4	0	0	0	—		0	0	4	0
Wellington Phoenix	2023–24	A-League Men	27	0	2	0	—		2	0	31	0
Wellington Phoenix	Total		45	0	5	0	0	0	3	0	53	0
Portland Timbers	2024	Major League Soccer	2	0	0	0	—		—		2	0
Portland Timbers	2025	Major League Soccer	35	0	1	0	2	0	—		38	0
Portland Timbers	2026	Major League Soccer	19	1	0	0	3	0	—		22	1
Portland Timbers	Total		56	1	1	0	2	0	0	0	62	0
Career total			136	2	9	0	2	0	5	0	155	2

== International goals ==
List of international goals scored by Finn Surman
No.	Date	Venue	Opponent	Score	Result	Competition
1.	27 June 2024	Freshwater Stadium, Port Vila, Vanuatu	Tahiti	1–0	5–0	2024 OFC Nations Cup
2.	14 October 2025	Ullevaal Stadion, Oslo, Norway	Norway	1–0	1–1	Friendly
3.	21 June 2026	BC Place, Vancouver, Canada	Egypt	1–0	1–3	2026 FIFA World Cup
4.	15 November 2026	One New Zealand Stadium, Christchurch, New Zealand	India	1–0	3–0	Friendly

== Honours ==
New Zealand

- OFC Nations Cup: 2024

Individual

- OFC Men's Nations Cup Best young player: 2024
