= Time in Vanuatu =

Time in Vanuatu is given by Vanuatu Time (VUT; UTC+11:00). Vanuatu does not currently observe daylight saving time. Vanuatu previously observed DST (UTC+12:00) between 1 September 1983 until 3 May 1993.

== IANA time zone database ==
In the IANA time zone database, Vanuatu is given one time zone:

c.c.*	coordinates*	TZ*	Comments	UTC offset	DST
VU	−1740+16825	Pacific/Efate		+11:00	+11:00
