= Elijah Just =

New Zealand footballer (born 2000)

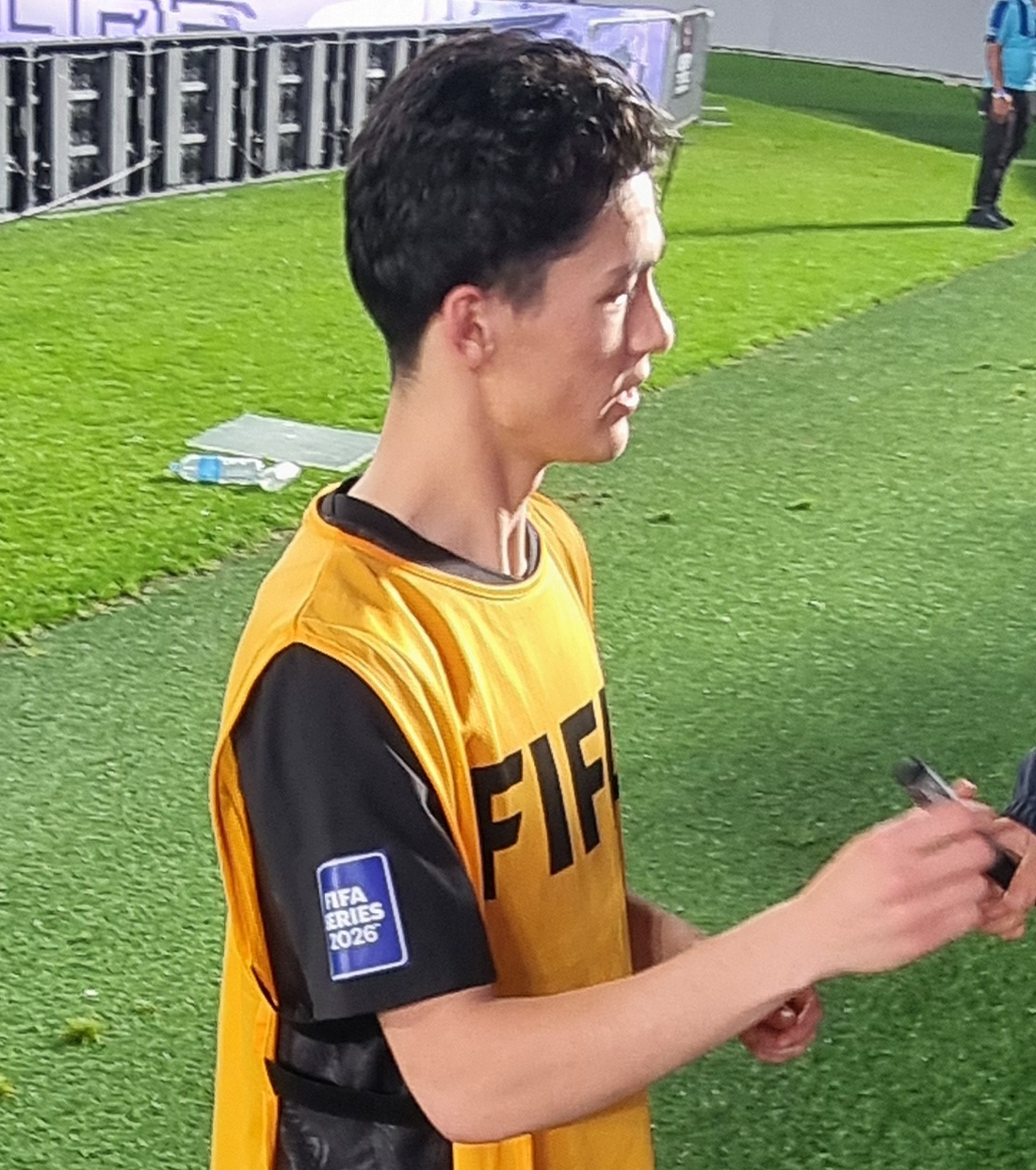
- Just in 2026

Personal information
- Full name: Elijah Henry Just
- Date of birth: 1 May 2000 (age 26)
- Place of birth: Palmerston North, New Zealand
- Height: 1.74 m (5 ft 9 in)
- Positions: Attacking midfielder; winger

Team information
- Current team: Swansea City
- Number: 8

Youth career
- –2015: Western Suburbs

Senior career*
Years	Team	Apps	(Gls)
2016–2018	Western Suburbs	50	(26)
2018–2019	Eastern Suburbs	20	(7)
2019–2022	Helsingør	71	(13)
2022–2025	Horsens	58	(4)
2024–2025	→ SKN St. Pölten (loan)	19	(6)
2025–2026	Motherwell	35	(7)
2026–	Swansea City	15	(1)

International career^{‡}
2017	New Zealand U17	7	(2)
2019	New Zealand U20	3	(1)
2019–	New Zealand	47	(12)
Medal record
Men's football
Representing New Zealand
OFC Nations Cup
Winner	2024 Fiji/Vanuatu
OFC U-17 Championship
Winner	2017 Samoa/Tahiti
- * Club domestic league appearances and goals as of 22 November 2026 ‡ National team caps and goals as of 26 June 2026

Elijah Henry Just (born 1 May 2000) is a New Zealand professional footballer who plays as an attacking midfielder or winger for EFL Championship club Swansea City and the New Zealand national team.

A full international for New Zealand since 2019, Just became the country's all-time leading scorer at the FIFA World Cup after scoring three goals in the 2026 tournament. He was also a member of the squad that won the 2024 OFC Nations Cup.

== Club career ==
=== Western Suburbs ===
Just joined the Olé Football Academy, then run by Declan Edge moving from Palmerston North to live at the academy. He played for Western Suburbs in the Central League that features teams from the lower half of the North Island of New Zealand. Just was part of the team to win the Central League in 2017, as well as runner-up in the 2018 Chatham Cup.

In 2018, Just had a brief trial at Dutch club PEC Zwolle. While he was deemed good enough for a contract, the club ultimately decided to not give him one. Due to Dutch rules, he would have needed to be given a non-EU salary. PEC Zwolle found this to be too expensive at the time.

=== Eastern Suburbs ===
Just was part of Eastern Suburbs winning New Zealand Football Championship team, that won the final series of the league, qualifying for the OFC Champions League. Just finished the season playing in 20 games, scoring 7 goals.

=== FC Helsingør ===
In May 2019, FC Helsingør announced that Just would start at the club 1 July.

=== AC Horsens ===
On 1 July 2022, FC Helsingør announced that Just had been sold to AC Horsens.

On 21 August 2024, Just signed for Austrian 2. Liga club SKN St. Pölten on a season-long loan with an option to buy.

=== Motherwell ===
On 9 July 2025, Just signed for Scottish Premiership club Motherwell on a two-year contract for an undisclosed fee. In his debut season, he was shortlisted for PFA Scotland's Premiership player of the year.

=== Swansea City ===
On 22 July 2026, Just signed a three-year contract with EFL Championship club Swansea City.

== International career ==
=== Youth ===
Just was born in New Zealand to a NZ European father (with distant links to Prussia) and an NZ Chinese mother. He was part of the New Zealand U-17 team that won the 2017 OFC U-17 Championship, qualifying for the U-17 World Cup in India. Just played all three games the U-17 team played at the World Cup and was team captain in the second game against Paraguay.

Just was originally called up to be part of the New Zealand U-20 side to play at the OFC U-19 Championship in Tahiti but withdrew for club commitments with Western Suburbs. Even though Just didn't play in the OFC U-19 Championship, the team qualified for the U-20 World Cup in Poland and Just was part of the team that travelled to the tournament. He played in 3 games, scoring one goal in their Round of 16 defeat by penalties to Colombia U-20.

=== Senior ===
On 15 November 2019, Just made his national team debut for New Zealand in a friendly against Ireland, starting in their 1–3 loss.

On 25 June 2021, Just was called up to the New Zealand squad for the delayed 2020 Summer Olympics. Just scored his first international goal against Fiji in their 4–0 win during the 2022 FIFA World Cup qualifiers in Qatar.

On 14 May 2026, Just was selected in the 26-man squad for the 2026 FIFA World Cup. On 15 June, Just became the first player from New Zealand to score a brace in the FIFA World Cup, when he scored both of New Zealand's goals in their group stage opener against Iran which ended in a 2–2 draw. He later scored a consolation goal in a 5–1 defeat to Belgium in New Zealand's final group match. With his third goal at a senior FIFA World Cup, Just moved level with Hannah Wilkinson as New Zealand's all-time leading scorer across the men's and women's FIFA World Cups, with three goals each.

His opening goal against Iran was nominated for the FIFA World Cup Goal of the Tournament award, making him the first New Zealand player to receive the nomination.

== Career statistics ==
=== Club ===
As of match played 2 September 2026

Appearances and goals by club, season and competition
Club	Season	League			National cup (Note: Includes Chatham Cup, Danish Cup, Scottish Cup, FA Cup)		League cup (Note: Includes Scottish League Cup, EFL Cup)		Other		Total	
Club	Season	Division	Apps	Goals	Apps	Goals	Apps	Goals	Apps	Goals	Apps	Goals
Eastern Suburbs	2018–19	NZ Premiership	18	7	—		—		2 (Note: Appearances in New Zealand Football Championship play-offs)	0	20	7
Helsingør	2019–20	Danish 2nd Division	15	1	—		—		—		15	1
Helsingør	2020–21	Danish 1st Division	25	5	—		—		—		25	5
Helsingør	2021–22	Danish 1st Division	30	7	2	1	—		—		32	8
Helsingør	2022–23	Danish 1st Division	1	0	—		—		—		1	0
Helsingør	Total		71	13	2	1	—		—		73	14
Horsens	2022–23	Danish Superliga	27	0	3	0	—		—		30	0
Horsens	2023–24	Danish 1st Division	27	3	1	0	—		—		28	3
Horsens	2024–25	Danish 1st Division	4	0	0	0	—		—		4	0
Horsens	Total		58	3	4	0	—		—		62	3
SKN St. Pölten (loan)	2024–25	Austrian 2. Liga	19	6	—		—		—		19	6
Motherwell	2025–26	Scottish Premiership	35	7	2	0	6	0	—		43	7
Swansea City	2026–27	Championship	4	0	0	0	1	0	—		5	0
Career total			190	33	8	1	7	0	2	0	207	34

=== International ===
As of match played 26 June 2026

Appearances and goals by national team and year
National team	Year	Apps	Goals
New Zealand	2019	2	0
New Zealand	2021	3	0
New Zealand	2022	8	1
New Zealand	2023	7	0
New Zealand	2024	12	5
New Zealand	2025	8	2
New Zealand	2026	7	4
Total		47	12

Scores and results list New Zealand's goal tally first, score column indicates score after each Just goal.

List of international goals scored by Elijah Just
No.	Date	Venue	Cap	Opponent	Score	Result	Competition	Ref.
1	21 March 2022	Suheim bin Hamad Stadium, Doha, Qatar	7	Fiji	2–0	4–0	2022 FIFA World Cup qualification	
2	21 June 2024	Freshwater Stadium, Port Vila, Vanuatu	24	Vanuatu	3–0	4–0	2024 OFC Men's Nations Cup	
3	11 October 2024	Freshwater Stadium, Port Vila, Vanuatu	29	Tahiti	1–0	3–0	2026 FIFA World Cup qualification	
4	14 October 2024	North Harbour Stadium, Auckland, New Zealand	30	Malaysia	1–0	4–0	Friendly	
5	15 November 2024	Waikato Stadium, Hamilton, New Zealand	31	Vanuatu	6–1	8–1	2026 FIFA World Cup qualification	
6	18 November 2024	Mount Smart Stadium, Auckland, New Zealand	32	Samoa	7–0	8–0	2026 FIFA World Cup qualification	
7	24 March 2025	Eden Park, Auckland, New Zealand	34	New Caledonia	3–0	3–0	2026 FIFA World Cup qualification	
8	7 June 2025	BMO Field, Toronto, Canada	35	Ivory Coast	1–0	1–0	Friendly	
9	30 March 2026	Eden Park, Auckland, New Zealand	42	Chile	2–0	4–1	Friendly	
10	15 June 2026	SoFi Stadium, Inglewood, United States	45	Iran	1–0	2–2	2026 FIFA World Cup	
11	15 June 2026	SoFi Stadium, Inglewood, United States	45	Iran	2–1	2–2	2026 FIFA World Cup	
12	26 June 2026	BC Place, Vancouver, Canada	47	Belgium	1–3	1–5	2026 FIFA World Cup	

== Honours ==
Western Suburbs

- Central League: 2017
- Chatham Cup runner-up: 2018

Eastern Suburbs

- New Zealand Football Championship: 2018–19

New Zealand U17

- OFC U-17 Championship: 2017

New Zealand

- OFC Nations Cup: 2024
