= Ben Old =

New Zealand footballer (born 2002)

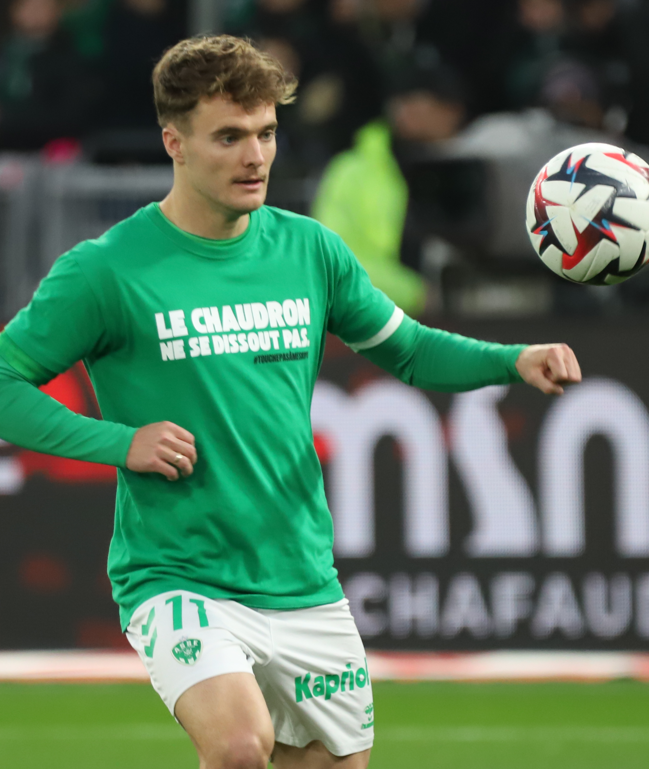
- Old playing for Saint-Étienne 2025

Personal information
- Full name: Benjamin Craig Old
- Date of birth: 13 August 2002 (age 24)
- Place of birth: Auckland, New Zealand
- Height: 1.73 m (5 ft 8 in)
- Position: Attacking midfielder

Team information
- Current team: Saint-Étienne
- Number: 11

Youth career
- –2016: Hibiscus Coast
- 2017: North Shore United
- 2018–2019: Wellington Phoenix

Senior career*
Years	Team	Apps	(Gls)
2019–2022	Wellington Phoenix Reserves	26	(4)
2021	→ Lower Hutt (loan)	6	(0)
2021–2024	Wellington Phoenix	71	(7)
2024–	Saint-Étienne	48	(1)

International career^{‡}
2018–2019	New Zealand U-17	4	(1)
2023–	New Zealand U-23	2	(1)
2022–	New Zealand	30	(3)
Medal record
Men's football
Representing New Zealand
OFC Nations Cup
Winner	2024 Fiji/Vanuatu
- * Club domestic league appearances and goals as of 21 September 2026 (UTC) ‡ National team caps and goals as of 5 October 2026 (UTC)

Benjamin Craig Old (born 13 August 2002) is a New Zealand professional footballer who plays as an attacking midfielder for Ligue 2 club Saint-Étienne and the New Zealand national team.

== Early life ==
Old began his sports career as a golfer; he was given his first golf club when he was two. Old was considered a former child golf prodigy, playing in his first international golf tournament at the age of seven. He had travelled to the United States to play against other child prodigies from around the world in Las Vegas, Pinehurst and San Diego.

== Club career ==
=== Wellington Phoenix ===
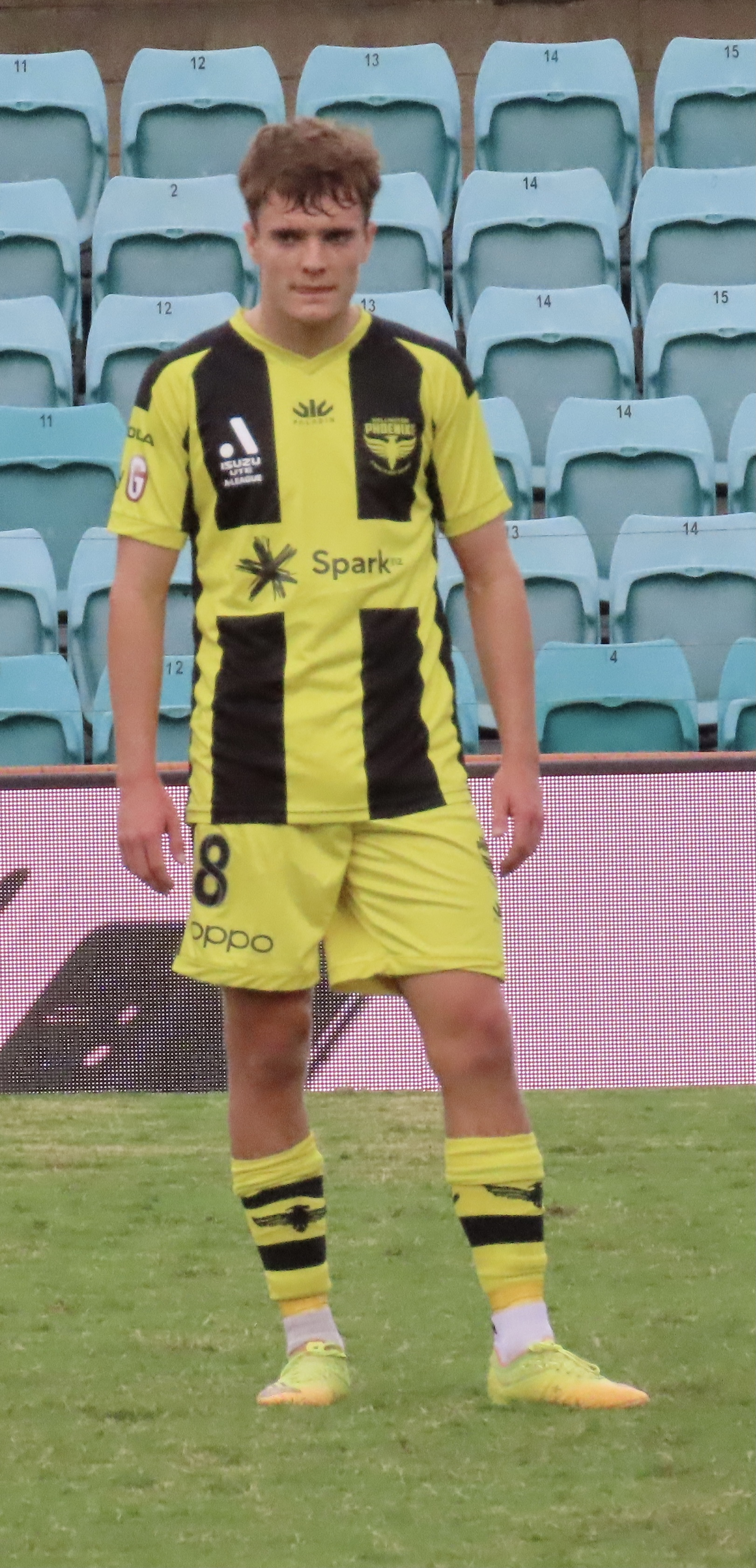
Old playing for Wellington in March 2022

Old originally lived in Auckland before he moved to Wellington and joined the Wellington Phoenix Football Academy in 2018. While not an official member of Wellington Phoenix's senior squad, Old had trained with the team before they went to Australia. Old joined the team again for training when they returned, making his debut as a substitute in the Phoenix's 3–0 win over Western United and nutmegging his defender with his first touch.

Old scored his first goal for the Wellington Phoenix during a 3–0 victory over the Brisbane Roar on 30 March 2022.

=== Saint-Étienne ===
On 9 July 2024, Old signed for Ligue 1 club Saint-Étienne on a four-year contract with an option for a fifth year.

On 17 August 2024, Old played his first game with Saint-Étienne, a 0-1 defeat against AS Monaco FC in the first day of the 2024–25 Ligue 1, becoming the first New Zealander to start a game in Ligue 1, and the second to even play. (Note: after Bill Tuiloma in 2015 with Marseille)

On 13 September 2024, he played his third Ligue 1 game, a 1-0 win against Lille, beating Bill Tuiloma’s tally of two games and setting a new record for a New Zealander in Ligue 1.

== International career ==
=== New Zealand U-17s ===
Old was part of the New Zealand U-17 team that won the 2018 OFC U-16 Championship and qualified for 2019 FIFA U-17 World Cup in Brazil. Old played in two games at the World Cup, first coming on as a sub in New Zealand's opening 1–2 loss to Angola before getting a start in the team's 1–0 win over Canada.

=== Olympic Games ===
On 25 June 2021, he was named in New Zealand reserve squad for the 2020 Olympics. Though he was actually travelled to Japan, he didn't play any game.

=== New Zealand ===
Old was named in the 30-man New Zealand squad for the 2022 FIFA World Cup Oceania qualifiers. He subsequently made his international debut on 19 March 2022, coming on as a substitute in the 67th minute during New Zealand's 1–0 victory against Papua New Guinea in the group stage.

On 14 May 2026, he was named in the 26-man squad for the 2026 FIFA World Cup.

== Career statistics ==
=== Club ===
As of match played 2 May 2026

Appearances and goals by club, season and competition
Club	Season	League			Cup		Others		Total	
Club	Season	Division	Apps	Goals	Apps	Goals	Apps	Goals	Apps	Goals
Wellington Phoenix Reserves	2019–20	Premiership	12	1	—		—		12	1
Wellington Phoenix Reserves	2020–21	Premiership	13	3	—		—		13	3
Wellington Phoenix Reserves	2021	National League	0	0	—		—		0	0
Wellington Phoenix Reserves	2022	National League	1	0	—		—		1	0
Wellington Phoenix Reserves	Total		26	4	0	0	0	0	26	4
Lower Hutt (loan)	2021	National League	6	0	—		—		6	0
Wellington Phoenix	2020–21	A-League Men	1	0	0	0	—		1	0
Wellington Phoenix	2021–22	A-League Men	23	1	2	0	1 (Note: Appearances in A-League Finals)	0	26	1
Wellington Phoenix	2022–23	A-League Men	17	1	2	0	0	0	19	1
Wellington Phoenix	2023–24	A-League Men	27	5	0	0	2	0	29	5
Wellington Phoenix	Total		68	7	4	0	3	0	75	7
Saint-Étienne	2024–25	Ligue 1	13	0	0	0	—		13	0
Saint-Étienne	2025–26	Ligue 2	30	1	2	4	1 (Note: Appearances in Promotion & relegation play-off)	0	33	5
Saint-Étienne	2026–27	Ligue 2	0	0	0	0	—		0	0
Saint-Étienne	Total		43	1	2	4	1	0	46	5
Career total			136	12	6	4	3	0	145	16

=== International ===
As of match played 5 October 2026.

Appearances and goals by national team and year
National team	Year	Apps	Goals
New Zealand	2022	2	0
New Zealand	2023	0	0
New Zealand	2024	10	1
New Zealand	2025	8	1
New Zealand	2026	10	1
Total		30	3

Scores and results list New Zealand's goal tally first, score column indicates score after each Old goal.

No.	Date	Venue	Cap	Opponent	Score	Result	Competition
1.	21 June 2024	VFF Freshwater Stadium, Port Vila, Vanuatu	6	Vanuatu	4–0	4–0	2024 OFC Men's Nations Cup
2.	15 November 2025	Chase Stadium, Fort Lauderdale, United States	19	Colombia	1–1	1–2	Friendly
3.	5 October 2026	Japan National Stadium, Tokyo, Japan	30	Japan	1–1	1–2	2026 Kirin Cup Soccer

== Honours ==
New Zealand

- OFC Nations Cup: 2024

Individual

- A-Leagues All Star: 2024

== See also ==
- List of foreign Ligue 1 players: N
