= Ben Aukwai =

Solomon Islands football referee

- Full name: Ben Ariel Aukwai
- Born: 1986 or 1987 (age 39–40); Malaita Province, Solomon Islands

Domestic
Years	League	Role
2013–present	S-League	Assistant referee Referee

International
Years	League	Role
2022–present	FIFA listed	Referee

Ben Ariel Aukwai (born 1986 or 1987) is a Solomon Islands football referee who has officiated at the S-League since 2013 and who is a FIFA-listed international referee since 2022.

== Career ==
Born in Malaita Province, Solomon Islands, Aukwai began his career as a football official in 2013, when he joined the S-League (the country's top flight) as an assistant referee, only to become a centre referee shortly afterwards, upon advice from his trainers.

Aukwai is a considered a top and prominent referee in OFC tournaments, and has been chosen as Referee of the Year of the local Solomon Islands' S-League: consecutively in 2021 and 2022, and again in 2025.

Among his most important games, Aukwai refereed the final of the OFC Men's Nations Cup in June 2024 in Port Vila, Vanuatu, where New Zealand were crowned champions following a 3–0 win against the local Vanuatu team. Other international matches included games at the 2023 OFC U-17 Championship in Fiji, with his most advanced match being a semifinal win by New Zealand against locals Fiji at the HFC Bank Stadium in Suva.

Aukwai has been granted a high OFC status, and FIFA has granted him professional training in Doha, Qatar, in Dubai, United Arab Emirates and in Argentina, where he attended physical fitness and technical seminars, with the aim of preparing for the 2026 FIFA World Cup.

In November 2024, Aukwai was nominated for the IFFHS World's Best Referee Award, being the first Solomon Islands referee to be nominated for the award, sharing the nomination with renowned referees like Polish Szymon Marciniak, English Michael Oliver, French François Letexier, Italian Daniele Orsato, and Brazilian Wilton Sampaio, among others. Letexier was ultimately chosen as the Year's Best Referee.

In August 2025, Aukwai was selected as the only OFC representative to referee matches at the 2025 FIFA U-17 World Cup in Qatar, with his assistants being Malaetala Salanoa of Samoa and Gareth Sheehan of New Zealand, making his debut at the tournament in the Group I opening match between Tajikistan and the Czech Republic, which ended in a Czech 6–1 victory.

== Selected performances ==
Date	Match	Result	Round	Tournament
30 June 2024	New Zealand – Vanuatu	3–0	Final	2024 OFC Men's Nations Cup
5 November 2025	Tajikistan – Czech Republic	1–6	Group stage	2025 FIFA U-17 World Cup
10 November 2025	Zambia – Brazil	1–1	Group stage	2025 FIFA U-17 World Cup
