= Campbell-Kirk Kawana-Waugh =

New Zealand association football referee

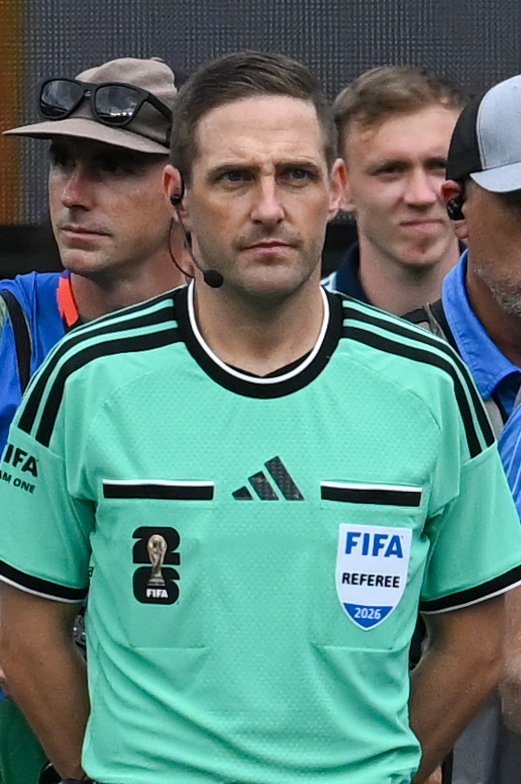
- Kawana-Waugh at the 2026 World Cup

Domestic
Years	League	Role
2009–2016	New Zealand Football Championship	Referee
2024	A-League Men	Referee

International
Years	League	Role
2011–	Oceania Football Confederation	Referee
2018–	FIFA listed	Referee

Campbell-Kirk Kawana-Waugh is a New Zealand association football referee.

== Career ==
In 2023, Kawana-Waugh was chosen as a support referee for the 2023 FIFA Club World Cup in Saudi Arabia. There, he served as the fourth official in two matches, including the second round match between Al Ahly and Al-Ittihad, and the semi-final between Manchester City and Urawa Red Diamonds. The following year, he was selected for the men's football tournament at the 2024 Summer Olympics in France, where he officiated two matches, including one between Mali and Israel.

In April 2026, Kawana-Waugh was selected as a referee for the 2026 FIFA World Cup, being the only referee from Oceania at the tournament.

== Personal life ==
Kawana-Waugh is a member of the Māori iwi of Ngāruahine. He is married to fellow referee Anna-Marie Keighley. In 2017, they became the first husband-and-wife pair in New Zealand to referee two cup finals on the same day, with Keighley officiating the 2017 Women's Knockout Cup final between Glenfield Rovers and Eastern Suburbs, while Kawana-Waugh officiated the 2017 Chatham Cup final between Onehunga Sports and Central United.
