= Freshwater Stadium =

Stadium in Vanuatu

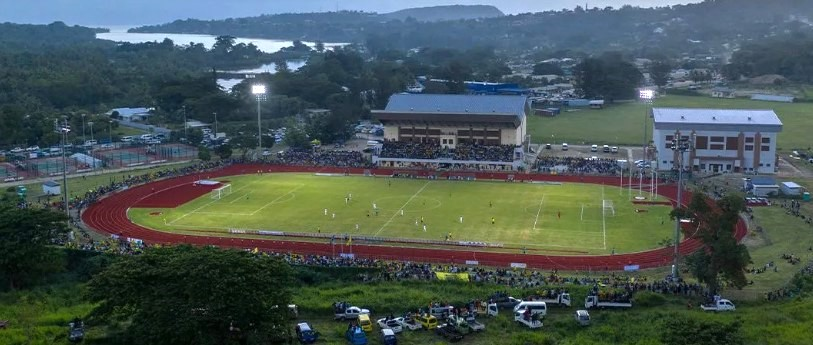
- Interactive map of Freshwater Stadium
- Coordinates: 17.72182572°S 168.32066541°E
- Owner: Vanuatu Football Federation
- Capacity: 6,500
- Surface: Grass

Construction
- Cost: USD4.5 million
- Structural engineer: Qualao Consulting

Tenant
- Vanuatu national football team (select matches)

The Freshwater Stadium is an association football stadium in Port Vila, the capital of Vanuatu. The stadium has a seating capacity of 6,500.

== History ==
In 2018 it was announced that FIFA would be financing a new football stadium in Vanuatu for the Vanuatu Football Federation (VFF). By February 2020, the first round of funds was used to level the site and run utilities while the second stage was to install fencing. Initial engineering work was completed by local firm Qualao Consulting. The handing-over of the completed stadium took place in May 2022. The following month, matches of the South Efaté League, a second-tier league in the country, began at the stadium and would continue to be held at the venue moving forward. The stadium is the first in the country to be accessible to people with reduced mobility. It also produces its own solar energy and features a water recirculation system that ensures that pitch can remain healthy during drier seasons. Despite its construction during the COVID-19 pandemic and the effects of two cyclones in the country, the stadium was completed fully by local companies and under-budget. The total cost to construct the stadium was Vt400 million.

== Events ==
In addition to hosting second-tier matches, the stadium is also used for matches of the VFF Champions League and the local Freshwater Youth League.

The stadium hosted the 2023 OFC Champions League, marking the first time that Vanuatu hosted a major OFC football tournament. The stadium was the competition's primary venue with the Korman Stadium reserved as a backup. In August 2023, the stadium hosted a legends match which was attended by FIFA president Gianni Infantino during his tour around Oceania.

The stadium also hosted the 2024 OFC Nations Cup in June 2024.
