= Auckland derby =

Auckland Derby
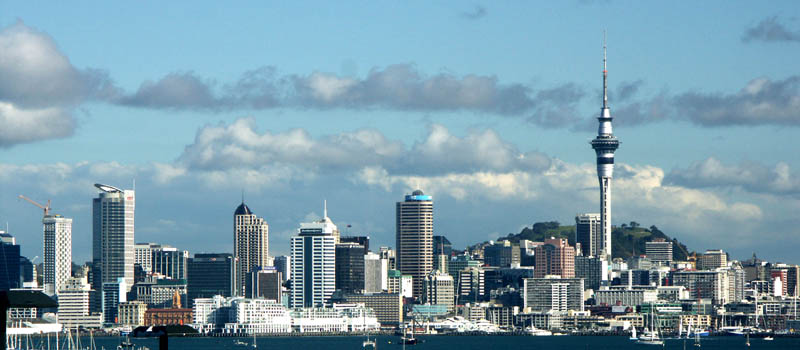
- Other names: Super City Derby
- Location: Auckland, New Zealand
- Teams: Auckland City FC; Waitakere United
- First meeting: Waitakere 1–3 Auckland; Championship (21 November 2004)
- Latest meeting: Auckland 2–2 Waitakere; Premiership (27 February 2021)
- Stadiums: Kiwitea Street (Auckland); Seddon Fields (Waitakere)

Statistics
- Total meetings: 62
- Most wins: Auckland (34)
- All-time series: Auckland: 34; Drawn: 13; Waitakere: 15
- Largest victory: Waitakere 0–5 Auckland; Premiership (29 October 2017)

The Auckland derby was a local football rivalry between two New Zealand Football Championship clubs based in the Auckland Region. Auckland City FC are located within Auckland City itself while Waitakere United are from neighbouring city Waitakere City. Since November 2010, the two cities are now part of the new super city; Auckland Council and the rivalry can now be classed as a city derby. Since the creation of the New Zealand Football Championship in 2004 the two clubs have dominated the league becoming the only sides to win the Premiership and the end of season playoffs. As a result of their dominance they have been annually awarded 2 places in the same group of the OFC Champions League adding a further two derby games to the calendar. It is also known as the Super City Derby. With the change of structure of football in New Zealand at the start of 2021, and the creation of the new New Zealand National League, this saw the end of Waitakere United, and consequently the end of the Auckland Derby.

== All-time results ==
Season	Date	Competition	Home team	Score	Away team	Goals (home)	Goals (away)	Attendance
2004–05	21-11-2004	Championship	Waitakere	1 – 3	Auckland	Jordan 37' (pen.)	Urlovic 6', 40'; Mulrooney 20'	?
2004–05	11-12-2004	Championship	Auckland	1 – 0	Waitakere	Young 58'	—	?
2004–05	12-02-2005	Championship	Auckland	4 – 2	Waitakere	Smith 6', 38'; Pritchett 53'; Young 58'	Jordan 62' (pen.); Pearce 90'	?
2004–05	12-03-2005	Championship Final	Auckland	3 – 2	Waitakere	Young 48', 90'; Mulrooney 81'	Ellensohn 31'; Jordan 70'	?
2005–06	04-12-2005	Championship	Waitakere	1 – 2	Auckland	Ellensohn 79'	Jordan 39', Young 90'	?
2005–06	12-02-2006	Championship	Auckland	5 – 1	Waitakere	Urlovic 9', 30', 34', Davani 86', 90'	Suri 63'	?
2005–06	26-03-2006	Championship	Waitakere	1 – 2	Auckland	? 50' (o.g.)	Jordan 28', 39' (pen.)	?
2006–07	29-10-2006	Championship	Waitakere	0 – 0 (Note: Originally finished 0-1 to Auckland, but Auckland fielded an ineligible player. Result changed to a 0-0 win for Waitakere.)	Auckland	—	~~Young 87'~~	?
2006–07	20-12-2006	Championship	Auckland	4 – 3	Waitakere	Jordan 68' (pen.), Seaman 75', Young 90+1', Urlovic 90+9'	Menapi 11', Koprivcic 24', Pearce 30'	?
2006–07	24-01-2007	OFC Champions League	Waitakere	2 – 2	Auckland	Hay 25', Menapi 48'	Urlovic 73', Young 89'	?
2006–07	18-02-2007	Championship	Auckland	1 – 1	Waitakere	Young 6'	Koprivcic 28'	?
2006–07	04-04-2007	OFC Champions League	Auckland	2 – 2	Waitakere	Jordan 20', 90+4'	Koprivcic 32', 35'	?
2006–07	16-04-2007	Championship Final	Waitakere	2 – 3	Auckland	Menapi 21' Campbell 90+3'	Mulrooney 16', Urlovic 51', Sykes 78'	?
2007–08	25-11-2007	Championship	Auckland	1 – 1	Waitakere	Jordan 80'	Totori 56'	2,200
2007–08	26-01-2008	Championship	Waitakere	2 – 0	Auckland	Seaman 9', Totori 33'	—	1,050
2007–08	20-02-2008	OFC Champions League	Auckland	0 – 1	Waitakere	—	Pearce 57'	?
2007–08	16-03-2008	Championship	Waitakere	1 – 0	Auckland	Pearce 19'	—	2,004
2007–08	02-04-2008	OFC Champions League	Waitakere	1 – 1	Auckland	Pearce 30'	Ki-Hyung 3'	?
2008–09	22-11-2008	OFC Champions League	Auckland	2 – 2	Waitakere	Jordan 45', 48'	Totori 21', Seaman 73'	1,200
2008–09	26-11-2008	Championship	Auckland	1 – 2	Waitakere	Williams 89'	Pearce 32', Koprivcic 83'	752
2008–09	24-01-2009	Championship	Waitakere	4 – 2	Auckland	Emblen 16', Krishna 22', Vincent 52', Totori 73'	Friel 46', Jordan 78' (pen)	711
2008–09	29-03-2009	Championship Final	Waitakere	1 – 2	Auckland	Pearce 15'	Jordan 78' Urlovic 89'	2,500
2008–09	05-04-2009	OFC Champions League	Waitakere	1 – 3	Auckland	Krishna 83'	Friel 68', Jordan 75', McGeorge 79'	2,500
2009–10	22-11-2009	Championship	Auckland	2 – 1	Waitakere	Vicelich 40', Young 80'	Rowley 33'	997
2009–10	28-11-2009	OFC Champions League	Waitakere	1 – 1	Auckland	Fisher 42'	Coombes 30'	?
2009–10	30-01-2010	Championship	Waitakere	1 – 1	Auckland	Myers 70'	Coombes 53'	2,238
2009–10	28-03-2010	OFC Champions League	Auckland	2 – 2	Waitakere	Koprivcic 30', Uhlmann 70'	Totori 3', 58'	2,500
2010–11	07-11-2010	Championship	Auckland	1 – 3	Waitakere	Edginton 2'	Pearce 22', De Vries 35', 51'	1,572
2010–11	14-11-2010	OFC Champions League	Waitakere	1 – 1	Auckland	Krishna 82'	Feneridis 90'	1,000
2010–11	16-01-2011	Championship	Waitakere	0 – 1	Auckland	—	Koprivcic 63'	1,573
2010–11	27-02-2011	OFC Champions League	Auckland	1 – 0	Waitakere	Kelly 12'	—	2,500
2010–11	10-04-2011	Championship Final	Waitakere	3 – 2	Auckland	Lucas 10', 37', Pritchett 90' (o.g)	Scott 26' (o.g.), Expósito 49'	3,500
2011–12	16-10-2011	Charity Cup	Waitakere	2 – 3	Auckland	Krishna 82'	Feneridis 90'	?
2011–12	13-11-2011	Championship	Waitakere	1 – 3	Auckland	McKenzie 42'	McKenzie 18' (o.g.), Myers 33' (o.g.), Mulligan 57'	1,034
2011–12	04-02-2012	Championship	Auckland	3 – 1	Waitakere	Corrales 29', Koprivcic 69', Expósito 81'	Bale 56'	2,003
2012–13	28-10-2012	Charity Cup	Waitakere	2 – 1	Auckland	Slefendorfas 47', Manko 89'	Vicelich 7'	800
2012–13	25-11-2012	Championship	Waitakere	1 – 1	Auckland	Butler 22'	Corrales 41'	650
2012–13	02-02-2013	Championship	Auckland	2 – 3	Waitakere	Feneridis 11', Expósito 48'	Luiz Del Monte 43', Krishna 59', Myers 74'	1,876
2012–13	17-03-2013	Championship Final	Waitakere	4 – 3 (aet)	Auckland	Krishna 30', 90', Pearce 32', 100'	Expósito 15', 74', Bale 89'	1,600
2012–13	07-04-2013	OFC Champions League	Waitakere	1 – 3	Auckland	Krishna 54'	Dickinson 4', 62' (pen.), Souto 50'	1,500
2012–13	21-04-2013	OFC Champions League	Auckland	0 – 1	Waitakere	—	Butler 26'	2,000
2012–13	19-05-2013	OFC Champions League Final	Waitakere	1 – 2	Auckland	Coombes 39'	Dickinson 16', Feneridis 19'	3,000
2013–14	03-11-2013	Charity Cup	Waitakere	1 – 4	Auckland	Lowdon 3'	Tade 29', Koprivcic 52', Krishna 55', Milne 89'	800
2013–14	30-11-2013	Championship	Auckland	2 – 0	Waitakere	Bale 31', White 90+1'	—	1,274
2013–14	02-02-2014	Championship	Waitakere	1 – 0	Auckland	Manko 3'	—	679
2013–14	01-03-2014	Championship Playoffs	Waitakere	0 – 4	Auckland	—	Tade 27', 43', Vicelich 88', Iwata 90+4'	484
2013–14	09-03-2014	Championship Playoffs	Auckland	4 – 1	Waitakere	Milne 16', Bale 27', Tade 40' (pen.), 48'	Cardozo 71'	941
2014–15	08-11-2014	Championship	Waitakere	0 – 1	Auckland	—	Browne 90+3'	?
2014–15	08-03-2015	Championship	Auckland	1 – 0	Waitakere	Carril 9'	—	?
2014–15	21-03-2015	Championship Playoffs	Waitakere	0 – 2	Auckland	—	De Vries 27', García 44'	?
2014–15	29-03-2015	Championship Playoffs	Auckland	5 – 1	Waitakere	Browne 13', 15', 60', Moreira 17', García 71'	Richards 63'	?
2015–16	08-11-2015	Championship	Waitakere	0 – 4	Auckland	—	Moreira 76', Lea'alafa 79', 87', De Vries 84'	?
2015–16	04-02-2016	Championship	Auckland	5 – 1	Waitakere	De Vries 10', 49', 79', White 20', Lewis 66'	O'Regan 40'	?
2016–17	16-10-2016	Championship	Auckland	0 – 1	Waitakere	—	Nash 4'	?
2016–17	26-02-2017	Championship	Waitakere	4 – 1	Auckland	Linderboom 30', Thelen 43', Collett 67', Hilliar 88'	Tade 13'	?
2017–18	29-10-2017	Championship	Waitakere	0 – 5	Auckland	—	Tade 36' (pen.), 73', De Vries 43', 63', 90	?
2017–18	07-01-2018	Championship	Auckland	2 – 2	Waitakere	Tade 29', McCowatt 67'	James 48', Linderboom 57' (pen.)	?
2018–19	06-01-2019	Championship	Waitakere	0 – 2	Auckland	—	López 39' (pen.), 58'	?
2018–19	17-03-2019	Championship	Auckland	5 – 2	Waitakere	Tavano 9', 86', Manickum 36', 45', Bonsu-Maro 47'	Conroy 82', 87'	?
2019–20	11-01-2020	Championship	Waitakere	2 – 6	Auckland	Schnell 56', Carlson-Du Toit 83'	Manickum 20', 48', Howieson 40', Bevan 64', Lewis 80', Bonsu-Maro 86'	600
2020–21	11-01-2020	Championship	Waitakere	0 – 3	Auckland	—	Awad 11', Rogerson 23', Howieson 48'	?
2020–21	27-02-2021	Championship	Auckland	2 – 2	Waitakere	Rogerson 17', Awad 61'	Schnell 50', Gibert 90+2'	?

=== Head to head ===
Club	Pld	W	D	L	GF	GA	GD
Auckland City FC	62	34	13	15	132	81	51
Waitakere United	62	15	13	34	81	132	-51

==== Comparative league placings ====
Pos.	05	06	07	08	09	10	11	12	13	14	15	16	17	18	19	20	21
1	1	1	1	1	1	1	1	1	1	1	1	1	1	1	1	1	1
2	2			2	2	2	2		2								
3			3					3					3			3	
4										4	4						4
5																	
6		6										6					
7														7			
8																	
9	—N/a											—N/a			9		—N/a
10	—N/a																—N/a

== Leading scorers ==
Rank	Player	Club	Total
1	(South Africa) Keryn Jordan	Waitakere United; Auckland City	15
2	(New Zealand) Ryan De Vries	Waitakere United; Auckland City	10
2	(South Africa) Grant Young	Auckland City	10
2	(New Zealand) Allan Pearce	Waitakere United	10
5	(Argentina) Emiliano Tade	Auckland City	9
5	(New Zealand) Daniel Koprivcic	Waitakere United; Auckland City	9
5	(Fiji) Roy Krishna	Waitakere United; Auckland City	9
8	(Solomon Islands) Benjamin Totori	Waitakere United	6
9	(Spain) Manel Expósito	Auckland City	5

== Titles by club ==
Club	Championship Winners		Premier Winners		OFC Champions League		Total
Club	Total	Seasons	Total	Seasons	Total	Seasons	Total
Auckland City	8	2004–05, 2005–06, 2006–07, 2008–09, 2013–14 2014–15, 2017–18, 2019–20	12	2004–05, 2005–06, 2009–10, 2011–12, 2013–14, 2014–15, 2015–16, 2016–17, 2017–18, 2018–19, 2019–20, 2020–21	9	2006, 2008–09, 2010–11, 2011–12, 2012–13, 2013–14, 2014–15, 2016, 2017	29
Waitakere United	5	2007–08, 2009–10, 2010–11, 2011–12, 2012–13	5	2006–07, 2007–08, 2008–09, 2010–11, 2012–13	2	2007, 2007–08	12
