= Samuel Wilkinson =

New Zealand footballer (born 1983)

Personal information
- Date of birth: 8 September 1983 (age 43)
- Place of birth: Napier, New Zealand
- Height: 1.81 m (5 ft 11 in)
- Position: Midfielder

Senior career*
Years	Team	Apps	(Gls)
–2007	Auckland City		
2007–2008	Waikato		
2009–2010	Waikato		

Managerial career
- West Brom (youth)
- Birmingham City (youth)
- 2019–2020: Wellington Phoenix Reserves
- 2020–2021: Wellington Phoenix Reserves (assistant)
- 2021–2022: Melville
- * Club domestic league appearances and goals

Samuel Wilkinson (born 8 September 1983) is a New Zealand football manager and former footballer who last managed Melville.

== Early life ==
Wilkinson was born on 8 September 1983 in Napier, New Zealand. Growing up in Hamilton, he is the son of New Zealand football manager Roger Wilkinson.

== Playing career ==
Wilkinson played for New Zealand side Auckland City, helping the club win the league title. In 2007, he signed for New Zealand side Waikato. Two years later, he returned to New Zealand side Waikato.

== Managerial career ==
Wilkinson obtained a UEFA B License and a UEFA A License and worked as a youth manager for English sides West Brom as well as Birmingham City. Afterwards, New Zealand newspaper The New Zealand Herald wrote that he and New Zealand manager Michael Mayne were "two of New Zealand's best young coaches". Subsequently, he was appointed manager of the reserve team of New Zealand side Wellington Phoenix, before becoming their assistant manager one year later. Following his stint there, he was appointed manager of New Zealand side Melville.
