= Chad Coombes =

New Zealand footballer

Personal information
- Full name: Chadwick Reuben Coombes
- Date of birth: 9 September 1983 (age 43)
- Place of birth: Hamilton, New Zealand
- Height: 1.78 m (5 ft 10 in)
- Position: Midfielder

Team information
- Current team: Waitakere United
- Number: 8

Senior career*
Years	Team	Apps	(Gls)
2000–2001	Hamilton Wanderers	?	(3)
2002	Melville United	?	(3)
2003	North Shore United	?	(1)
2003–2004	Football Kingz	6	(0)
2004	Central United	?	(5)
2004–2010	Auckland City	112	(9)
2010–2011	Fleet Town	19	(2)
2011–2012	Auckland City	11	(4)
2012–2014	Waitakere United	26	(2)
2014–2015	WaiBOP United	14	(5)
2015–	Waitakere United	5	(0)

International career^{‡}
2010–	New Zealand	1	(0)
- * Club domestic league appearances and goals as of 19 December 2009 ‡ National team caps and goals as of 4 March 2010

Chadwick Reuben Coombes (born 9 September 1983) is a New Zealand born association footballer who plays as a midfielder for Waitakere United in the ASB Premiership. Before joining Auckland City in 2004, he played for the Football Kingz in the now defunct Australian NSL.

== Club career ==
Coombes played with the Football Kingz in the National Soccer League before it went defunct, and moved to Auckland City FC. He has represented Auckland City in their first FIFA Club World Cup appearance in 2006, in which they failed to impress, losing every game, and failing to score a single goal, however he made history when he became one of the first Auckland City players to score in the 2009 competition in which he scored the second goal in their 2–0 win over United Arab Emirates club Al Ahli.

Coombes signed for English Isthmian League Division One South club Fleet Town in September 2010. He made his debut for the club against Eastbourne Town FC away from home, and drew 1–1.

Returning to New Zealand, Coombes re-signed with Auckland City for the 2011-12 ASB Premiership. In 2012, he signed for cross town rivals Waitakere United

Coombes signed for WaiBOP United for the 2014–15 ASB Premiership season Despite showing promise for the club on the pitch, he returned to Waitakere United for the 2015–16 ASB Premiership season.

== International career ==
Coombes made his international debut on 3 March 2010 after being called up to the national team for their pre-world cup friendly against Mexico as a replacement for Craig Henderson who was injured whilst training for his club. New Zealand would go on to lose the game 2–0.

== Personal life ==
Coombes was a teacher of physical education and health at Rutherford College in Auckland. He then moved to Massey High School where he continued to teach physical education and health. He also took on the role of coaching the girls first XI. He is currently the Director of Sport at Onehunga High School in Auckland.

== Club career statistics ==
All-Time Club Performances
Club	Season	NSL		Finals		Asia		Total
Club	Season	App	Goals	App	Goals	App	Goals	App	Goals
Football Kingz (National Soccer League)	2003–04	6	0					6	0
Football Kingz (National Soccer League)	Club Total	245	56387	!				6	0
Club	Season	NZFC		Club World Cup		Oceania		Total
Club	Season	App	Goals	App	Goals	App	Goals	App	Goals
Auckland City FC (New Zealand Football Championship)	2004–05
Auckland City FC (New Zealand Football Championship)	2005–06					4	0	4	0
Auckland City FC (New Zealand Football Championship)	2006–07			2	0	3	0	5	0
Auckland City FC (New Zealand Football Championship)	2007–08	20	1			4	1	24	2
Auckland City FC (New Zealand Football Championship)	2008–09	17	2			3	3	20	5
Auckland City FC (New Zealand Football Championship)	2009–10	14	1	3	1	4	2	21	4
Auckland City FC (New Zealand Football Championship)	Club Total	51	4	5	1	18	6	74	11
Career totals
Last updated 11 April 2010

== Honours ==
With Auckland City

- ACFC Young Player of the Year: 2004–05
- ACFC Supporters Player of the Year: 2008–09
- New Zealand Football Championship: 2004–05, 2005–06, 2006–07, 2008–09
- OFC Champions League: 2006, 2009, 2012
- 2006 FIFA Club World Cup: – 7th
- 2009 FIFA Club World Cup: – 5th
- 2011 FIFA Club World Cup: – 7th
