= 2010–11 New Zealand Football Championship =

ASB Premiership
- Season: 2010–11
- Champions: Waitakere United
- Runner up: Auckland City FC
- Matches: 28
- Goals: 92 (3.29 per match)
- Top goalscorer: Allan Pearce (13)
- Biggest home win: ACFC 5-0 HBU (Round 9); TW 5-0 OU (Round 9); WU 6-1 YHM (Round 13); WU 6-1 WFC (Round 15)
- Biggest away win: YoungHeart Manawatu 0-4 Waitakere United (Round 5)
- Highest scoring: Waitakere United 5-2 Canterbury United (Semi-final)

The New Zealand Football Championship's 2010–11 season (known as the ASB Premiership for sponsorship reasons) is the seventh season of the NZFC since its establishment in 2004. The home and away season began on 16 October 2010 with a kickoff between Auckland City FC and Waikato FC. Auckland City and Waitakere United will represent the ASB Premiership in the 2010–11 OFC Champions League after finishing Premiers and Champions respectively in the 2009–10 competition.

== Clubs ==
As in the previous season, eight clubs participated in the league.

=== Stadia and locations ===
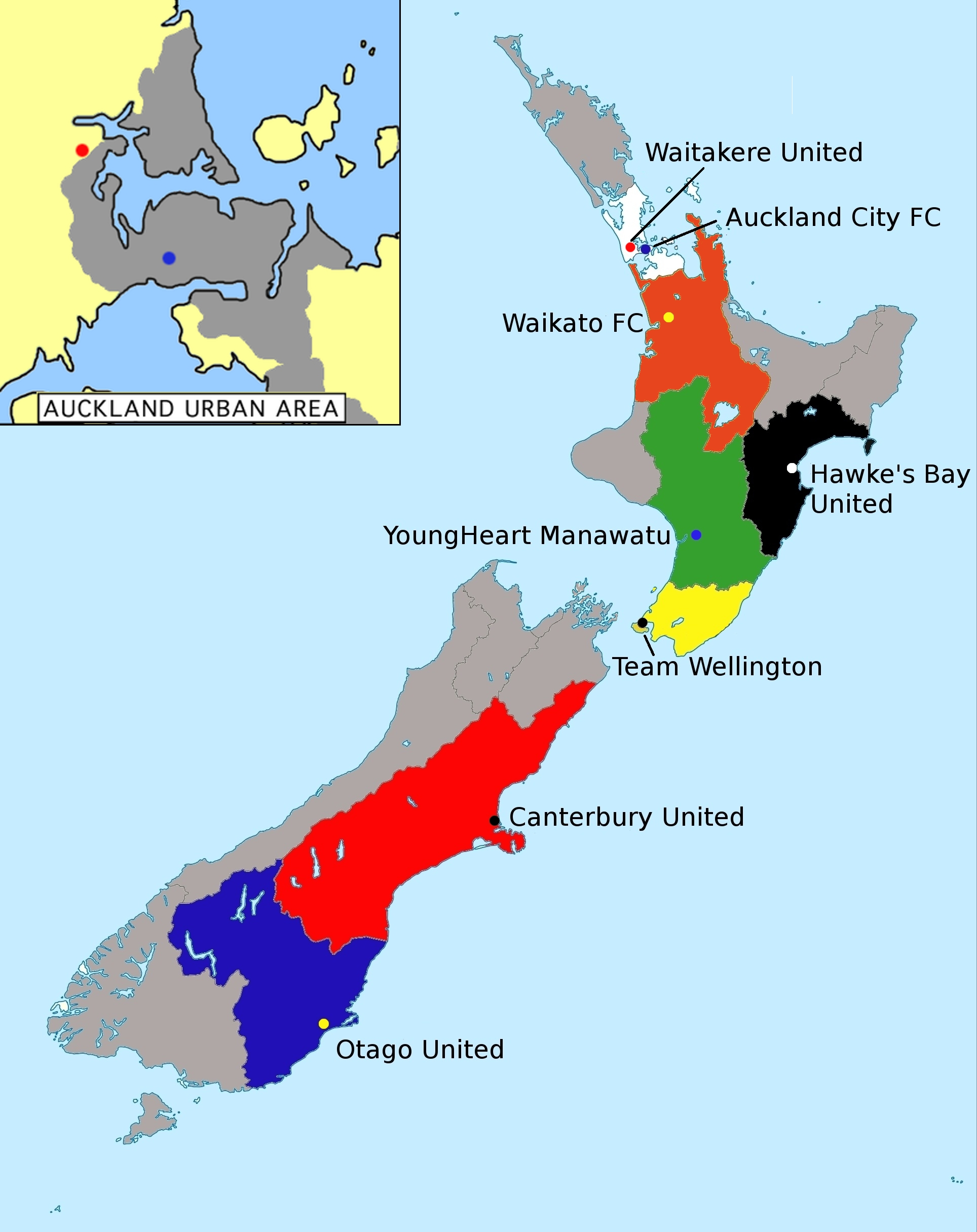
Location of clubs and the region they represent

Team	Location	Stadium	Stadium capacity^{1}
Auckland City FC	Auckland	Kiwitea Street	3,000
Canterbury United	Christchurch	English Park	8,000
Hawke's Bay United	Napier	Bluewater Stadium	4,000
Otago United	Dunedin	Forsyth Barr Stadium	30,748
Team Wellington	Wellington	Newtown Park	5,000
Waikato FC	Hamilton	Waikato Stadium	25,800
Waitakere United	Waitakere City	Fred Taylor Park	2,500
YoungHeart Manawatu	Palmerston North	Memorial Park	8,000

== League table ==
Pos	Team	Pld	W	D	L	GF	GA	GD	Pts	Qualification
1	Waitakere United (C)	14	12	0	2	39	12	+27	36	Qualified for the 2011–12 OFC Champions League
2	Auckland City	14	9	3	2	29	12	+17	30	Qualified for the 2011–12 OFC Champions League
3	Team Wellington	14	7	2	5	28	23	+5	23	Qualified for the 2011 ASB Premiership Finals
4	Canterbury United	14	6	2	6	20	19	+1	20	Qualified for the 2011 ASB Premiership Finals
5	Hawke's Bay United	14	5	4	5	18	22	−4	19	
6	Waikato FC	14	4	3	7	21	33	−12	15	
7	Otago United	14	3	3	8	15	30	−15	12	
8	YoungHeart Manawatu	14	1	1	12	19	38	−19	4	

(C) Champions

== Regular season ==
=== Round 1 ===
16 October 2010	Waikato FC	2 – 3	Auckland City FC	Fred Jones Park, Hamilton
Saturday 3:00pm	Nikolic 19'; Palmer 43'	Preview; Summary/Report	Koprivcic 38' (pen.); Mulligan 79', 82'	Attendance: 500 approx. Referee: Chris Kerr

17 October 2010	Waitakere United	2 – 0	Team Wellington	Fred Taylor Park
Sunday 2:00pm	Duncan 8' (o.g.); Emblen 90+2'	Preview; Summary/Report		Attendance: 483; Referee: Mirko Benischke

=== Round 2 ===
30 October 2010	Team Wellington	0 – 0	Auckland City FC	David Farrington Park, Wellington
Saturday 2:00pm		Preview; Summary/Report		Attendance: 412; Referee: Nick Waldron

31 October 2010	Hawke's Bay United	1 – 3	Waitakere United	Park Island, Napier
Sunday 2:00pm	Birnie 80'	Preview; Summary/Report	Pearce 2', 47'; Krishna 17'	Attendance: 650; Referee: Chris Kerr

=== Round 3 ===
7 November 2010	Otago United	0 – 1	Waikato FC	Tahuna Park, Dunedin
Sunday 12:30pm		Preview; Summary/Report	Hicks 7'	Attendance: 150; Referee: Darren Sundborn

7 November 2010	YoungHeart Manawatu	0 – 1	Hawke's Bay United	Memorial Park, Palmerston North
Sunday 2:00pm		Preview; Summary/Report	McIvor 90'	Attendance: 250; Referee: Mirko Benischke

7 November 2010	Team Wellington	2 – 4	Canterbury United	David Farrington Park, Wellington
Sunday 2:00pm	John Sutherland 31'; Tade 88'	Preview; Summary/Report	Kamo 3', 17', 73'; Joe Murray 71'	Attendance: 392; Referee: Matt Conger

7 November 2010	Auckland City FC	1 – 3	Waitakere United	Kiwitea Street, Auckland
Sunday 3:00pm	Edington 2'	Preview; Summary/Report	Peacre 22'; De Vries 35', 51'	Attendance: 1 572; Referee: Chris Kerr

=== Round 4 ===
14 November 2010	Canterbury United	1 – 0	YoungHeart Manawatu	Linfield Park, Christchurch
Sunday 2:00pm	Feni 15'	Preview; Summary/Report		Attendance: 400

14 November 2010	Hawke's Bay United	3 – 2	Otago United	Park Island, Napier
Sunday 2:00pm	Bevin 8', 49', 62'	Preview; Summary/Report	Hancock 9'; Seaman 48'	Attendance: 380; Referee: Nick Waldron

=== Round 5 ===
21 November 2010	Team Wellington	3 – 1	Waikato FC	David Farrington Park, Wellington
Sunday 2:00pm	Sutherland 55' (pen.); Kamri 79', 89'	Preview; Summary/Report	Manko 24'	Attendance: 419; Referee: Jarred Gillett

21 November 2010	Canterbury United	0 – 0	Hawke's Bay United	Linfield Park, Christchurch
Sunday 2:00pm		Preview; Summary/Report		Attendance: 450; Referee: Mike Hester

21 November 2010	YoungHeart Manawatu	0 – 4	Waitakere United	Memorial Park, Palmerston North
Sunday 2:00pm		Preview; Summary/Report	Gwyther 28'; De Vries 35'; Krishna 67'; Pierce 74'	Attendance: 150; Referee: Chris Kerr

21 November 2010	Auckland City FC	0 – 0	Otago United	Kiwitea Street, Auckland
Sunday 3:00pm		Preview; Summary/Report		Attendance: 418; Referee: Mirko Benischke

=== Round 6 ===
27 November 2010	Waikato FC	3 – 0	YoungHeart Manawatu	Fred Jones Park, Hamilton
Saturday 2:00pm	Hicks 13' (pen.); Palmer 63'; Jones 65'	Preview; Summary/Report		Attendance: 250; Referee: Nick Waldron

27 November 2010	Waitakere United	2 – 1	Canterbury United	Fred Taylor Park, Auckland
Saturday 2:00pm	Gwyther 30'; Pearce 71'	Preview; Summary/Report	Attwell 86'	Attendance: 507; Referee: Jarrod Gillet

28 November 2010	Otago United	0 – 3	Team Wellington	Caledonian Ground, Dunedin
Sunday 2:00pm		Preview; Summary/Report	Coburn 6' (o.g.); Sutherland 23', 39'	Attendance: 160; Referee: Mike Hester

28 November 2010	Hawke's Bay United	2 – 2	Auckland City FC	Park Island, Napier
Sunday 2:00pm	Bevin 46'; Smith 83' (pen.)	Preview; Summary/Report	Feneridis 13', 25'	Attendance: 450; Referee: Jonathon Price

=== Round 7 ===
5 December 2010	Canterbury United	2 – 2	Waikato FC	AMI Stadium, Christchurch
Saturday 2:00pm	Clapham 3' (pen.); Barton 54'	Preview; Summary/Report	Nikolic 33', 61'	Attendance: 650+ Referee: Chris Kerr

5 December 2010	YoungHeart Manawatu	1 – 2	Otago United	Memorial Park, Palmerston North
Saturday 2:00pm	Higham 49'	Preview; Summary/Report	Knox 17'; Ruggles 59'	Attendance: 100

=== Round 8 ===
11 December 2010	Auckland City FC	3 – 1	YoungHeart Manawatu	Kiwitea Street, Auckland
Saturday 2:00pm	? 10' (o.g.); Berlanga 23'; Morgan 40'	Preview; Summary/Report	White 61'	Attendance: 629; Referee: Darren Sundborn

11 December 2010	Waikato FC	1 – 3	Waitakere United	Fred Jones Park, Hamilton
Saturday 3:00pm	Nikolic 28'	Preview; Summary/Report	Lovemore 4'; Krishna 29'; Pearce 47'	Attendance: 250; Referee: Matt Conger

12 December 2010	Hawke's Bay United	2 – 3	Team Wellington	Park Island, Napier
Sunday 1:00pm	Smith 13'; Bevin 35'	Preview; Summary/Report	Kamri 48'; Fifi 80'; Tade 88'	Attendance: 200; Referee: Peter O'Leary

12 December 2010	Otago United	2 – 1	Canterbury United	Caledonian Ground, Dunedin
Sunday 2:00pm	Ruggles 86'; Knox 90+3'	Preview; Summary/Report	Kamo 35'	Attendance: 200; Referee: Nick Waldron

=== Round 9 ===
18 December 2010	Auckland City FC	5 – 0	Hawke's Bay United	Kiwitea Street, Auckland
Saturday 2:30pm	McGeorge 6', 65', 87' (pen.); Kelly 73'; Milne 76'	Preview; Summary/Report		Attendance: 554; Referee: Nick Waldron

19 December 2010	YoungHeart Manawatu	5 – 2	Waikato FC	Memorial Park, Palmerston North
Sunday 2:00pm	White 9', 29', 73'; Higham 46'; Hayne 80'	Preview; Summary/Report	Nikolic 23'; Margetts 86'	Attendance: 150; Referee: Matt Conger

19 December 2010	Canterbury United	0 – 2	Waitakere United	Linfield Park, Christchurch
Sunday 3:00pm		Preview; Summary/Report	Krishna 15'; Bale 35'	Referee: Darren Sundborn

19 December 2010	Team Wellington	5 – 0	Otago United	David Farrington Park, Wellington
Sunday 3:00pm	Sutherland 20'; Cheriton 22'; Kamri 75', 86'; Tade 84'	Preview; Summary/Report		Attendance: 351; Referee: C-K Waugh

=== Round 10 ===
8 January 2011	Waikato FC	1 – 0	Hawke's Bay United	Fred Jones Park, Hamilton
Saturday 3:00pm	Nikolic 76'	Preview; Summary/Report		Attendance: 200; Referee: Peter O'Leary

8 January 2011	Waitakere United	3 – 1	Otago United	Fred Taylor Park, Auckland
Saturday 4:00pm	Pearce 2'; Gwyther 58'; Emblen 90'	Preview; Summary/Report	Ruggles 12'	Attendance: 421; Referee: Matt Conder

9 January 2011	Canterbury United	1 – 2	Auckland City FC	Linfield Park, Christchurch
Saturday 2:00pm	Clapham 12' (pen.)	Preview; Summary/Report	Kelly 22'; Koprivcic 36'	Attendance: 380; Referee: Chris Kerr

9 January 2011	YoungHeart Manawatu	2 – 3	Team Wellington	Memorial Park, Palmerston North
Saturday 2:00pm	Hayne 75' (pen.), 90+2' (pen.)	Preview; Summary/Report	Barbarouses 10'; Kamri 32'; Cheriton 80'	Attendance: 175; Referee: Nick Waldron

=== Round 11 ===
15 January 2011	Waikato FC	2 – 2	Otago United	Fred Jones Park, Hamilton
Saturday 3:00pm	Hicks 38' (pen.); Nikolic 56'	Preview; Summary/Report	Rodeka 46'; Ruggles 49'	Attendance: 250; Referee: Nick Waldron

16 January 2011	Hawke's Bay United	2 – 1	YoungHeart Manawatu	Park Island, Napier
Sunday 2:00pm	Bevin 20'; Taylor 61'	Preview; Summary/Report	White 62'	Attendance: 250; Referee: Chris Kerr

16 January 2011	Canterbury United	1 – 2	Team Wellington	Trafalgar Park, Nelson
Sunday 2:00pm	Feni 70'	Preview; Summary/Report	Cheriton 9'; Cain 64'	Attendance: 2,500; Referee: Jamie Cross

16 January 2011	Waitakere United	0 – 1	Auckland City FC	Fred Taylor Park, Auckland
Sunday 4:00pm		Preview; Summary/Report	Koprivcic 63'	Attendance: 1,537; Referee: Campbell-Kirk Waugh

=== Round 12 ===
22 January 2011	Auckland City FC	5 – 1	Waikato FC	Kiwitea Street, Auckland
Saturday 3:00pm	Mulligan 12'; Koprivcic 49', 56'; Kelly 68'; Milne 90'	Preview; Summary/Report	Hicks 83'	Attendance: 833; Referee: Matt Conger

22 January 2011	Team Wellington	1 – 2	Waitakere United	Newtown Park, Wellington
Saturday 3:30pm	Patrick 89'	Preview; Summary/Report	Krishna 31'; Lucas 65'	Attendance: 344; Referee: Mike Hester

23 January 2011	Otago United	0 – 0	Hawke's Bay United	Tahuna Park, Dunedin
Sunday 12:00pm		Preview; Summary/Report		Attendance: 300; Referee: Jamie Cross

23 January 2011	YoungHeart Manawatu	2 – 3	Canterbury United	Memorial Park, Palmerston North
Sunday 12:00pm	Ishi 65', 79'	Preview; Summary/Report	Terris 15'; Rowe 45+3'; Kamo 50'	Attendance: 200; Referee: Campbell-Kirk Waugh

=== Round 13 ===
29 January 2011	Waikato FC	2 – 3	Team Wellington	Fred Jones Park, Hamilton
Saturday 12:30pm	Strom 44'; Hicks 45'	Preview; Summary/Report	Kamri 10'; Tade 69', 84'	Attendance: 200; Referee: Chris Kerr

29 January 2011	Waitakere United	6 – 1	YoungHeart Manawatu	Fred Taylor Park, Auckland
Saturday 2:00pm	Lucas 4', 21'; Rowley 52'; Krishna 60'; Pearce 65', 77'	Preview; Summary/Report	White 34'	Attendance: 343; Referee: Mirko Benischke

30 January 2011	Otago United	0 – 3	Auckland City FC	Tahuna Park, Dunedin
Sunday 2:00pm		Preview; Summary/Report	Mulligan 52', 59'; Kelly 75'	Attendance: 250; Referee: Campbell-Kirk Waugh

30 January 2011	Hawke's Bay United	1 – 2	Canterbury United	Park Island, Napier
Sunday 2:00pm	Smith 14'	Preview; Summary/Report	Kamo 27', 32'	Attendance: 450; Referee: Peter O'Leary

=== Round 14 ===
12 February 2011	Waikato FC	1 – 0	Canterbury United	Centennial Park, Hamilton
Saturday 12:30pm	Peat 26'	Preview; Summary/Report		Attendance: 150; Referee: Michael Hester

12 February 2011	Waitakere United	1 – 2	Hawke's Bay United	Fred Taylor Park, Auckland
Saturday 2:00pm	Rowley 85'	Preview; Summary/Report	Smith 47', 90+2'	Attendance: 357; Referee: Jamie Cross (Campbell-Kirk Waugh 73')

13 February 2011	Otago United	4 – 3	YoungHeart Manawatu	Tahuna Park, Dunedin
Sunday 12:00pm	Anderson 22'; Lockhart 25'; Coburn 83'; Burgess 90+3'	Preview; Summary/Report	Rande 36'; Hodge 64'; Fraser 81'	Attendance: 200; Referee: Chris Kerr

13 February 2011	Auckland City FC	2 – 0	Team Wellington	Kiwitea Street, Auckland
Sunday 2:00pm	Expósito 44'; Corrales 67'	Preview; Summary/Report		Attendance: 867; Referee: Jon Price

=== Round 15 ===
19 February 2011	Waitakere United	6 – 1	Waikato FC	Fred Taylor Park, Whenuapai, Auckland
Saturday 2:00pm	Lucas 36'; Pearce 41', 52'; Rowley 50'; De Vries 57'; Gwyther 74'	Preview; Summary/Report	Nikolic 77'	Attendance: 456; Referee: Peter O'Leary

20 February 2011	Team Wellington	1 – 3	Hawke's Bay United	Newtown Park, Wellington
Sunday 2:00pm	Tade 88'	Preview; Summary/Report	Bevin 48', 90'; McIvor 89'	Attendance: 300; Referee: Darren Sundborn

20 February 2011	Canterbury United	3 – 1	Otago United	Linfield Park, Christchurch
Sunday 2:00pm	Miles 45'; Kamo 51'; Murray 70'	Preview; Summary/Report	Collins 66' (o.g.)	Attendance: 250; Referee: Matt Conger

2 March 2011	YoungHeart Manawatu	1 – 2	Auckland City FC	Memorial Park, Palmerston North
Wednesday 6:00 pm	Rande 18'	Preview; Summary/Report	Expósito 38'; Milne 48'	Attendance: 200; Referee: Matt Bull

=== Round 16 ===
6 March 2011	Otago United	1 – 2	Waitakere United	Tahuna Park, Dunedin
Saturday 2:00pm	Burgess 90+5'	Preview; Summary/Report	Gwyther 3'; Pearce 21'	Attendance: 300; Referee: Mirko Benischke

6 March 2011	Hawke's Bay United	1 – 1	Waikato FC	Park Island, Napier
Saturday 2:00pm	Bevin 30'	Preview; Summary/Report	Nikolic 8'	Attendance: 700; Referee: Mike Hester

6 March 2011	Team Wellington	2 – 2	YoungHeart Manawatu	Newtown Park, Wellington
Saturday 4:00pm	Tade 36'; Sutherland 39'	Preview; Summary/Report	White 74'; Falvey 90+1'	Attendance: n/a Referee: Peter O'Leary

10 March 2011	Auckland City FC	0 – 1	Canterbury United	Kiwitea Street, Auckland
Thursday 5:30pm		Preview; Summary/Report	88' Ken Yamamoto	Attendance: 342; Referee: Chris Kerr

== Finals ==
Semi-finals
1	Waitakere United	6	0	6
4	Canterbury United	2	1	3
2	Auckland City FC	2	5	7
3	Team Wellington	0	1	1

Finals
1	Waitakere United	3
2	Auckland City FC	2

=== Semi-finals – first leg ===
13 March 2011	Team Wellington	0 – 2	Auckland City FC	David Farrington Park, Wellington
Sunday 1:30pm		Preview; Summary/Report	78' Corrales; 90' Expósito	Attendance: 423; Referee: Mirko Benischke

13 March 2011	Waitakere United	6 – 2	Canterbury United	Fred Taylor Park, Auckland
Sunday 2:00 pm	6', 15' De Vries; 9', 40' Lucas; 12' Scott; 61' Pearce	Preview; Summary/Report	81' Wortelboer; 83' Schwarz	Attendance: 387; Referee: Chris Kerr

=== Semi-finals – second leg ===
27 March 2011	Auckland City FC	5 – 1 (7 – 1 on aggregate)	Team Wellington	Kiwitea Street, Auckland
Sunday 3:30pm	1', 53' Koprivcic; 30' Dickinson; 64' Corrales; 85' Expósito	Preview; Summary/Report	16' Kamri	Attendance: 637; Referee: Peter O'Leary

3 April 2011	Canterbury United	1 – 0 (3 – 6 on aggregate)	Waitakere United	Tulett Park, Christchurch
Sunday 2:00pm	31' (pen.) Clapham	Preview; Summary/Report		Attendance: 280; Referee: Peter O'Leary

=== Final ===
10 April 2011
Sunday 2:00pm

Waitakere United	3 – 2	Auckland City FC
Dakota Lucas 10', 37'; James Pritchett 90' (o.g.)		Aaron Scott 26' (o.g.); Expósito 49'

Douglas Field, Auckland
Attendance: 3 500
Referee: Peter O'Leary

== Scorers ==
Updated to Round 16.

Total	Player		Team	Goals per Round															
Total	Player		Team	1	2	3	4	5	6	7	8	9	10	11	12	13	14	15	16
12	(New Zealand)	Allan Pearce	Waitakere United		2	1		1	1		1		1			2		2	1
9	(New Zealand)	Andy Bevin	Hawke's Bay United				3		1		1			1				2	1
9	(New Zealand)	Milos Nikolic	Waikato FC	1						2	1	1	1	1				1	1
8	(New Zealand)	Russel Kamo	Canterbury United			3					1				1	2		1	
7	(Morocco)	Hitcham Kamri	Team Wellington					2			1	2	1			1			
7	(New Zealand)	Michael White	YoungHeart Manawatu								1	3		1		1			1
6	(Fiji)	Roy Krishna	Waitakere United		1			1			1	1			1	1			
6	(Argentina)	Emiliano Tade	Team Wellington								1	1				2		1	1
6	(Scotland)	John Sutherland	Team Wellington			1		1	2			1							1
5	(Croatia)	Daniel Koprivcic	Auckland City FC	1									1	1	2				
5	(New Zealand)	Jason Hicks	Waikato FC			1			1					1	1	1			
5	(New Zealand)	Dave Mulligan	Auckland City FC	2											1	2			
5	(New Zealand)	Jarrod Smith	Hawke's Bay United						1		1					1	2		
5	(New Zealand)	Mike Gwyther	Waitakere United					1	1				1					1	1
4	(England)	Phil Ruggles	Otago United							1	1		1	1					
4	(Scotland)	Stuart Kelly	Auckland City FC									1	1		1	1			
4	(New Zealand)	Dakota Lucas	Waitakere United												1	2		1	
4	(South Africa)	Ryan De Vries	Waitakere United			2		1										1	

A goal was scored from a penalty kick Two goals were scored from penalty kicks

=== Own goals ===
Updated to end of Round 16.

Total	Player		Team	Week(s)
1	(New Zealand)	Jamie Duncan	Team Wellington (v Waitakere United)	1
1	(New Zealand)	Andy Coburn	Otago United (v Team Wellington)	6
1	(New Zealand)	Glen Collins	Canterbury United (v Otago United)	15
