= Allan Pearce =

New Zealand footballer and physiotherapist

Personal information
- Full name: Allan David Pearce
- Date of birth: 7 April 1983 (age 43)
- Place of birth: Wellington, New Zealand
- Height: 5 ft 10 in (1.78 m)
- Position: Striker

Team information
- Current team: Waitakere United
- Number: 10

Youth career
- 1999–2002: Barnsley

Senior career*
Years	Team	Apps	(Gls)
2002	Barnsley	0	(0)
2002	→ Worksop Town (loan)		
2002–2004	Lincoln City	19	(1)
2004	Bradford Park Avenue		
2004–2005	Waitakere United		
2006	Worksop Town		
2006–2014	Waitakere United	110	(54)
2021–2026	West Coast Rangers	51	(23)

International career^{‡}
- New Zealand U17
- New Zealand U23
2008	New Zealand	1	(0)
- * Club domestic league appearances and goals as of 9 April 2009 ‡ National team caps and goals as of 17 February 2007

Allan David Pearce (born 7 April 1983) is a former New Zealand footballer.

He currently works as a physiotherapist in Auckland.

== Club career ==
Born in Wellington, Pearce joined Barnsley on a three-year scholarship in December 1999 and progressed through the academy ranks at the club and into the reserves. In August 2002, Pearce joined Worksop Town on work experience for an indefinite period, impressing in a pre-season friendly victory over Sheffield Wednesday before making his Northern Premier League debut for the Tigers in the 2–0 home defeat to Burscough on 17 August 2002.

In October 2002 he signed professionally for Lincoln City where he made a number of League 2 appearances before returning to his native New Zealand to play for Waitakere United.

In September 2006, Pearce re-signed with Waitakere United after a short spell playing in England again, this time with Worksop Town when they were in the Conference North Division.

== International career ==
Pearce has represented New Zealand at under 17 and under 23 level.

He made his full All Whites debut in a 3-1 World Cup qualifier win over New Caledonia on 6 September 2008.

== Career statistics ==
=== Club ===
Club	Season	League			Cup		Continental		Other		Total	
Club	Season	Division	Apps	Goals	Apps	Goals	Apps	Goals	Apps	Goals	Apps	Goals
Barnsley	2001–02	First Division	0	0	0	0	—		0	0	0	0
Lincoln City	2002–03	Third Division	16	1	0	0	—		0	0	16	1
Lincoln City	2003–04	Third Division	1	0	0	0	—		0	0	1	0
Lincoln City	Total		17	1	0	0	0	0	0	0	17	1
Waitakere United	2004–05	Premiership		6	—		—					
Worksop Town	2005–06	Conference North					—					
Waitakere United	2006–07	Premiership	19	9	—		6 (Note: Appearances in OFC Champions League)	2	1 (Note: Appearances in New Zealand Football Championship play-offs)	0	26	11
Waitakere United	2007–08	Premiership	21	9	—		6	4	1	1	28	14
Waitakere United	2008–09	Premiership	11	5	—		4	0	4 (Note: Three appearances; one goal in New Zealand Football Championship play-offs; one appearance in FIFA Club World Cup)	1	19	6
Waitakere United	2009–10	Premiership	12	4	—		8	2	3	2	23	8
Waitakere United	2010–11	Premiership	14	13	—		6	3	3	1	23	17
Waitakere United	2011–12	Premiership	14	9	—		6	3	4 (Note: Three appearances; one goal in New Zealand Football Championship play-offs; one appearance; one goal in Charity Cup)	2	24	14
Waitakere United	2012–13	Premiership	14	5	—		8	0	4 (Note: Three appearances; two goals in New Zealand Football Championship play-offs; one appearance in Charity Cup)	2	26	7
Waitakere United	2013–14	Premiership	5	0	—		—		2	0	7	0
Waitakere United	Total		110	54	0	0	44	14	22	9	176	77
West Coast Rangers	2021	National League	6	0	1	0	—		—		7	0
West Coast Rangers	2022	NRFL Division 1	22	14	1	0	—		—		23	14
West Coast Rangers	2023	National League	20	8	2	1	—		—		22	9
West Coast Rangers	2024	National League	22	10	1	0	—		—		23	10
West Coast Rangers	2025	National League	17	3	2	3	—		—		19	6
West Coast Rangers	2026	NRFL Championship		9			—		—		19	6
West Coast Rangers	Total		77	34	7	4	0	0	0	0	95	39
Career total												
