= 2008–09 OFC Champions League =

Tournament details
- Dates: 1 November 2008 – 2 May 2009
- Teams: 6 (from 5 associations)

Final positions
- Champions: (New Zealand) Auckland City (2nd title)
- Runners-up: (Solomon Islands) Koloale

Tournament statistics
- Matches played: 14
- Goals scored: 53 (3.79 per match)
- Top scorer(s): (South Africa) Keryn Jordan (8 goals)

The 2008–09 OFC Champions League was the 8th edition of the Oceanian Club Championship, Oceania's premier club football tournament organized by the Oceania Football Confederation (OFC), and the 3rd season under the current OFC Champions League name. The competition consisted of a home and away group stage, followed by a knockout round. It took place from 2 November 2008 until 3 May 2009.

A qualifying round was due to be played, but due to the withdrawal of the representatives from the Cook Islands and Tuvalu, the entrants from Papua New Guinea automatically gained entry to the main draw. It is unknown why the domestic champions of Tahiti and New Caledonia were unable to participate.

The winner of the tournament was Auckland City of New Zealand, who beat Koloale of the Solomon Islands in the two legged final, claiming Oceania's US$1 million (NZ$1.41 million) berth in the 2009 FIFA Club World Cup in Japan.

== Participating teams ==
Location of teams of the 2008–09 OFC Champions League.
Participated
Withdrew
Disallowed
Eligible but did not enter

Direct to group stage

- Auckland City (New Zealand) – 2007–08 New Zealand Football Championship regular season runner-up
- Ba (Fiji) – 2008 Fiji National League premier
- Koloale (Solomon Islands) – 2007–08 Solomon Islands National Club Championship champion
- Port Vila Sharks (Vanuatu) – 2008 VFF Bred Cup winner
- Waitakere United (New Zealand) – 2007–08 New Zealand Football Championship champion and premier

O-League Preliminary

Entrants

- Hekari United (Papua New Guinea) – 2007–08 Papua New Guinea National Soccer League champion
- Tupapa Maraerenga (Cook Islands)
- Nauti FC (Tuvalu)

Other OFC nations

- Magenta (New Caledonia) – disallowed
- Sinamoga (Samoa) – did not enter
- Tongans (Tonga) – did not enter
- Konica Machine FC (American Samoa) – did not enter
- (French Polynesia) (Tahiti) – member nation not eligible

Under the rules of the OFC Champions League, the winner of the O-League Preliminary competition replaces the last-placed member nation from the previous year's O-League.

== Qualifying stage ==
Hekari United automatically qualified to the Group Stage following the withdrawal of the representative clubs from Cook Islands and Tuvalu.

Pos	Team	Pld	W	D	L	GF	GA	GD	Pts	Qualification
1	(Papua New Guinea) Hekari United	0	0	0	0	0	0	0	0	Automatically qualifield for group stage
2	(Cook Islands) Tupapa Maraerenga	0	0	0	0	0	0	0	0	Withdrew
3	(Tuvalu) Nauti FC	0	0	0	0	0	0	0	0	Withdrew

== Group stage ==
=== Group A ===
Pos	Team	Pld	W	D	L	GF	GA	GD	Pts	AUC	WAI	PVS
1	(New Zealand) Auckland City	4	3	1	0	15	4	+11	10		2–2	8–1
2	(New Zealand) Waitakere United	4	2	1	1	9	7	+2	7	1–3		3–0
3	(Vanuatu) Port Vila Sharks	4	0	0	4	3	16	−13	0	0–2	2–3	

2 November 2008
15:00 UTC+13

Auckland City (New Zealand)	2–2	(New Zealand) Waitakere United
Jordan 45', 48'	Report	Totori 21'; Seaman 73'

Kiwitea Street, Auckland
Attendance: 1,200
Referee: Peter O'Leary (New Zealand)

22 November 2008
17:00 UTC+13

Waitakere United (New Zealand)	3–0	(Vanuatu) Port Vila Sharks
Seaman 21'; Krishna 28', 34'	Report

Douglas Field, Henderson
Attendance: 400
Referee: Norbert Hauata (Tahiti)

13 December 2008
17:30 UTC+11

Port Vila Sharks (Vanuatu)	0–2	(New Zealand) Auckland City
	Report	Vava 8' (o.g.); Urlovic 70'

Port Vila Municipal Stadium, Port Vila
Attendance: 2,000
Referee: Jimmy Wright (New Caledonia)

14 February 2009
15:00 UTC+13

Auckland City (New Zealand)	8–1	(Vanuatu) Port Vila Sharks
Urlovic 9', 71'; Coombes 22', 47', 77'; Nikolic 30' (pen.), 81'; Feneridis 59'	Report	Feneridis 40' (o.g.)

Kiwitea Street, Auckland
Referee: Averii Jacques (Tahiti)

7 March 2009
15:00 UTC+11

Port Vila Sharks (Vanuatu)	2–3	(New Zealand) Waitakere United
Poida 17'; Sakama 57'	Report	Bale 10'; Seaman 54'; Hay 75'

Port Vila Municipal Stadium, Port Vila
Attendance: 2,000
Referee: Rakesh Varman (Fiji)

5 April 2009
15:00 UTC+12

Waitakere United (New Zealand)	1–3	(New Zealand) Auckland City
Krishna 83'	Report	Friel 68'; Jordan 75'; McGeorge 79'

Douglas Field, Henderson
Attendance: 2,500
Referee: Kevin Stoltenkamp (New Zealand)

=== Group B ===
Pos	Team	Pld	W	D	L	GF	GA	GD	Pts	KOL	HSU	BA
1	(Solomon Islands) Koloale	4	2	1	1	4	2	+2	7		3–1	1–0
2	(Papua New Guinea) Hekari United	4	2	0	2	6	6	0	6	1–0		1–2
3	(Fiji) Ba	4	1	1	2	3	5	−2	4	0–0	1–3	

2 November 2008
15:00 UTC+12

Ba (Fiji)	0–0	(Solomon Islands) Koloale
	Report

Govind Park, Ba
Attendance: 2,000
Referee: Lencie Fred (Vanuatu)

22 November 2008
15:00 UTC+11

Koloale (Solomon Islands)	3–1	(Papua New Guinea) Hekari United
Anisua 37'; Muri 39'; Nawo 77'	Report	Iniga 9'

Lawson Tama Stadium, Honiara
Attendance: 10,000
Referee: Michael Hester (New Zealand)

13 December 2008
15:00 UTC+10

Hekari United (Papua New Guinea)	1–2	(Fiji) Ba
Iniga 1'	Report	Vakatalesau 6'; Dunadamu 84'

Lloyd Robson Oval Stadium, Port Moresby
Attendance: 8,000
Referee: Chris Beath (Australia)

14 February 2009
15:00 UTC+12

Ba (Fiji)	1–3	(Papua New Guinea) Hekari United
Vakatalesau 58'	Report	Jack 17' (pen.); Waroi 34'; Mela 37'

Govind Park, Ba
Attendance: 5,000
Referee: Peter O'Leary (New Zealand)

7 March 2009
15:00 UTC+10

Hekari United (Papua New Guinea)	1–0	(Solomon Islands) Koloale
Jack 35' (pen.)	Report

Lloyd Robson Oval Stadium, Port Moresby
Attendance: 5,000
Referee: Strebre Delovski (Australia)

28 March 2009
15:00 UTC+11

Koloale (Solomon Islands)	1–0	(Fiji) Ba
Muri 34'	Report

Lawson Tama Stadium, Honiara
Attendance: 10,000
Referee: Lencie Fred (Vanuatu)

== Final ==
Team 1	Agg.	Team 2	1st leg	2nd leg
Koloale (Solomon Islands)	4–9	(New Zealand) Auckland City	2–7	2–2

25 April 2009
15:00 UTC+11

Koloale FC Honiara (Solomon Islands)	2–7	(New Zealand) Auckland City FC
Anisua 10', 76'	Report	Williams 23'; Ki-Hyung 39'; Urlovic 40'; Vicelich 58'; Jordan 65', 77', 86'

Lawson Tama Stadium, Honiara
Attendance: 20,000
Referee: Strebre Delovski (Australia)

Koloale FC Honiara:
	2	(Solomon Islands) Welshman Houkarawa	(yellow card) 75'
	3	(Solomon Islands) Jeffrey Bule
	5	(Solomon Islands) Richard Anisua
	6	(Solomon Islands) Timothy Joe
	13	(Solomon Islands) Lency Saeni		(substituted off) ??'
	14	(Solomon Islands) Nicholas Muri
	15	(Solomon Islands) Mostyn Beui
	16	(Solomon Islands) Joses Nawo
	18	(Solomon Islands) Henry Koto		(substituted off) 57'
	19	(Solomon Islands) Henry Fa'arodo
GK	16	(Solomon Islands) Shadrack Ramoni
Substitutes:
	8	(Solomon Islands) Peter Taloga		(substituted on) 57'
	10	(Solomon Islands) Ezra Sale
	12	(Solomon Islands) Oscar Sara
GK	21	(Solomon Islands) Eddie Ramo
	23	(Solomon Islands) Leonard Rakoto
	16	(Solomon Islands) Kluivert Dagi		(substituted on) ??'
	30	(Solomon Islands) Tony Otini
Manager:
(Solomon Islands) Luke Eroi

Auckland City FC:
DF	3	(United States) Matt Friel
MF	5	(New Zealand) Matt Williams
DF	6	(South Korea) Lee Ki-Hyung
DF	7	(New Zealand) James Pritchett
FW	9	(New Zealand) Paul Urlovic	(substituted off) 45'
FW	10	(New Zealand) Grant Young
GK	12	(New Zealand) Jacob Spoonley
MF	13	(New Zealand) Alex Feneridis
DF	15	(New Zealand) Ivan Vicelich
DF	16	(Solomon Islands) George Suri	(substituted off) 15'
FW	24	(New Zealand) Milos Nikolic	(substituted off) 80'
Substitutes:
GK	1	(New Zealand) John Fletcher
DF	4	(New Zealand) Sam Campbell	(substituted on) 15'
FW	14	(South Africa) Keryn Jordan	(substituted on) 45'
DF	21	(New Zealand) Riki van Steeden
DF	22	(Spain) Xavi Roca
MF	23	(England) Liam Mulrooney	(substituted on) 80'
DF	26	(New Zealand) Jonathan Raj
Manager:
(New Zealand) Paul Posa

Assistant referees:
Michael Mouauri (Cook Islands)
Hilary Ani (Papua New Guinea)
Fourth official:
Chris Beath (Australia)

3 May 2009
14:00 UTC+12

Auckland City FC (New Zealand)	2–2	(Solomon Islands) Koloale FC Honiara
Jordan 56' (pen.), 58'	Report	Fa'arodo 40'; Saeni 60'

Kiwitea Street, Auckland
Attendance: 1,250
Referee: Norbert Hauata (Tahiti)

Auckland City FC:
DF	3	(United States) Matt Friel
DF	4	(New Zealand) Sam Campbell
MF	5	(New Zealand) Matt Williams
DF	6	(South Korea) Lee Ki-Hyung		(substituted off) 90'
DF	7	(New Zealand) James Pritchett
FW	9	(New Zealand) Paul Urlovic		(substituted off) 50'
FW	10	(New Zealand) Grant Young		(substituted off) 86'
GK	12	(New Zealand) Jacob Spoonley
MF	13	(New Zealand) Alex Feneridis	(yellow card) 39'
DF	15	(New Zealand) Ivan Vicelich
FW	24	(New Zealand) Milos Nikolic
Substitutes:
GK	1	(New Zealand) John Fletcher
FW	14	(South Africa) Keryn Jordan		(substituted on) 50'
DF	21	(New Zealand) Riki van Steeden		(substituted on) 90'
DF	22	(Spain) Xavi Roca
MF	23	(England) Liam Mulrooney		(substituted on) 86'
DF	26	(New Zealand) Jonathan Raj
Manager:
(New Zealand) Paul Posa

Koloale FC Honiara:
2	(Solomon Islands) Welshman Houkarawa
3	(Solomon Islands) Jeffrey Bule
5	(Solomon Islands) Richard Anisua
6	(Solomon Islands) Timothy Joe
13	(Solomon Islands) Lency Saeni	(substituted off) ??'
14	(Solomon Islands) Nicholas Muri
15	(Solomon Islands) Mostyn Beui
16	(Solomon Islands) Joses Nawo
18	(Solomon Islands) Henry Koto	(substituted off) 57'
19	(Solomon Islands) Henry Fa'arodo
GK	20	(Solomon Islands) Shadrack Ramoni
Substitutes:
1	(Solomon Islands) Santas Kabini
8	(Solomon Islands) Peter Taloga	(substituted on) 57'
10	(Solomon Islands) Ezra Sale
26	(Solomon Islands) Kluivert Dagi	(substituted on) ??'
30	(Solomon Islands) Tony Otini
Manager:
(Solomon Islands) Luke Eroi

Assistant referees:
Tevita Makasini (Tonga)
Mahit Chilia (Vanuatu)
Fourth official:
Averii Jacques (Tahiti)

Auckland City won 9–4 on aggregate.

The OFC Champions League winner also advances to the qualifying round of the 2009 FIFA Club World Cup.

OFC Champions League
2008–2009 Winners
(New Zealand)
Auckland City
Second title

== Topscorers ==
Rank	Player	Club	MD1	MD2	MD3	MD4	F1	F2	Total
1	(South Africa) Keryn Jordan	(New Zealand) Auckland City	2			1	3	2	8
2	(New Zealand) Paul Urlovic	(New Zealand) Auckland City		1	2		1		4
3	(Solomon Islands) Richard Anisua	(Solomon Islands) Koloale		1			2		3
3	(New Zealand) Chad Coombes	(New Zealand) Auckland City			3				3
3	(Fiji) Roy Krishna	(New Zealand) Waitakere United		2		1			3
3	(Wales) Paul Seaman	(New Zealand) Waitakere United	1	1	1				3
7	(Solomon Islands) Abraham Iniga	(Papua New Guinea) Hekari United	1	1					2
7	(Papua New Guinea) Kema Jack	(Papua New Guinea) Hekari United			1	1			2
7	(Solomon Islands) Nicholas Muri	(Solomon Islands) Koloale		1		1			2
7	(New Zealand) Milos Nikolic	(New Zealand) Auckland City			2				2
7	(Fiji) Osea Vakatalesau	(Fiji) Ba		1	1				2
Last updated May 3, 2009
