= 2004–05 New Zealand Football Championship =

New Zealand Football Championship
- Season: 2004–05
- Champions: Auckland City
- Oceania Club Championship: Auckland City
- Matches: 86
- Goals: 286 (3.33 per match)

2004–05 was the first season of the New Zealand Football Championship, replacing the New Zealand National Football Leagues, which ran from 1970 to 2003. It was organised by the New Zealand Football and was contested by eight competing teams.

== Team locations ==
Location of teams in the 2004–05 New Zealand Football Championship

Club Name	Home City	Stadium
Auckland City FC	Auckland	Kiwitea Street
Canterbury United	Christchurch	English Park
Napier City Rovers FC	Napier	Bluewater Stadium
Otago United	Dunedin	Sunnyvale Park
Team Wellington FC	Wellington	Newtown Park
Waikato FC	Ngaruawahia	Centennial Park
Waitakere United	Waitakere City	Douglas Field
YoungHeart Manawatu	Palmerston North	Memorial Park

== Season summary ==
The league kicked off on 15 October 2004, with a 3–1 victory for Auckland City at Napier City Rovers and it soon became clear that Auckland City, along with Waitakere United, were the class teams in the championship. Auckland lost only three games all year en route to becoming the first winners of the New Zealand Football Championship, while Waitakere lost four times to Auckland City, including the thrilling 3–2 final in front of 3,800 spectators at Auckland City's home field, Kiwitea Street, where Auckland came back from 2-1 down to win in the last minutes of the game.

Waikato FC came out best of the rest to take the final playoff position in third, despite making a slow start to the season. Notables among the other teams were Napier City Rovers, who also came back from a slow start to have a chance of making the playoffs in the final week of the season. Otago United won five games all year, but did not win any of their last twelve games.

== League table ==
Pos	Team	Pld	W	D	L	GF	GA	GD	Pts	Qualification
1	Auckland City (C)	21	14	4	3	53	24	+29	46	Qualified for the finals and Club Championship
2	Waitakere United	21	12	4	5	39	19	+20	40	Qualified for the finals
3	Waikato FC	21	9	4	8	27	25	+2	31	Qualified for the finals
4	Canterbury United	21	7	6	8	31	38	−7	27	
5	Napier City Rovers	21	7	5	9	39	48	−9	26	
6	Team Wellington	21	5	8	8	35	40	−5	23	
7	Otago United	21	5	5	11	26	46	−20	20	
8	YoungHeart Manawatu	21	4	6	11	26	36	−10	18	

(C) Champions

https://www.rsssf.org/tablesn/nz05.html

=== Results ===
Home \ Away	AC	WU	WFC	CU	NCR	TW	OU	YHM	AC	WU	WFC	CU	NCR	TW	OU	YHM
Auckland City																
Waitakere United																
Waikato FC																
Canterbury United																
Napier City Rovers																
Team Wellington																
Otago United																
YoungHeart Manawatu																

Updated to match(es) played on unknown. Source:
Legend: Blue = home team win; Yellow = draw; Red = away team win.

== Finals ==
Waitakere and Waikato play in the Elimination Final, the winner of which plays Auckland in Grand Final.

=== Bracket ===
Elimination final
2	Waitakere United	4
3	Waikato	1

Grand final
1	Auckland City	3
2	Waitakere United	2

=== Elimination final ===
6 March 2005	Waitakere United	4–1	Waikato
	Ellensohn 9'; Wylie 37'; Jordan 54', 82'		Callinan 33' (pen.)

=== Grand final ===
12 March 2005	Auckland City	3–2	Waitakere United	Kiwitea Street, Auckland
	Young 48', 90'; Mulrooney 81'		Ellensohn 31'; Jordan 70'

== Oceania Club Championship ==
By winning the NZFC, Auckland City went on to represent New Zealand in the Oceania Club Championship in Tahiti. Auckland lost their first game to Australian representatives Sydney FC, 3–2 in the dying minutes. Their next game, against tournament hosts AS Pirae of Tahiti, was also a loss, this time by 1–0. Auckland City would take some consolation from finishing third in their group after defeating the champions of Papua New Guinea, Sobou FC, by 6–1.

Preceded by National Soccer League	New Zealand Football Championship; 2004-05	Succeeded by 2005–06

== See also ==
- New Zealand Football Championship
