= Champions League 2008–09 =

Champions League 2008–09 may refer to:

- UEFA Champions League 2008–09
- CONCACAF Champions League 2008–09
- OFC Champions League 2008–09
