= Steve Cain =

New Zealand football manager

Personal information
- Full name: Stephen Cain
- Date of birth: 12 December 1958 (age 67)
- Place of birth: Liverpool, England

Senior career*
Years	Team	Apps	(Gls)
- Coventry City
- Tranmere Rovers
- Perth Italia
	Morwell Falcons	12	(2)

Managerial career
- 2002: Papua New Guinea
- 2005–2007: Waitakere United
- 2011: New Zealand U17
- * Club domestic league appearances and goals

Steve Cain (born 12 December 1958) is a New Zealand professional soccer coach and former player.

== Career ==
Early in his career, he had spells at Coventry City and Tranmere Rovers, before moving to Hong Kong, New Zealand, South Africa and then to Australia to join Western Australian state league side Perth Italia.

He moved to reigning Victorian state league champions Morwell Falcons in 1990, playing 12 games and scoring two penalties.

In 2002, he was a head coach of the Papua New Guinea national football team. Also he coached the Waitakere United and New Zealand U17.
