= Maksim Manko =

New Zealand footballer (born 1989)

Personal information
- Full name: Maksim Evgenevich Manko
- Date of birth: 11 May 1989 (age 37)
- Place of birth: Ukrainian SSR, Soviet Union
- Positions: Midfielder; striker

Team information
- Current team: Onehunga-Mangere

Youth career
- –2006: Three Kings United

Senior career*
Years	Team	Apps	(Gls)
2006–2010	Three Kings United		
2010–2011	Waikato FC	14	(1)
2012	Sportivo Dock Sud	14	(3)
2012	Waitakere United	5	(0)
2013	Santos de Guápiles	20	(2)
2013	Bay Olympic		
2013	WaiBOP United	6	(4)
2014–2017	Three Kings United		
2014	Waitakere United	8	(3)
2015	WaiBOP United	4	(0)
2018	Te Atatū		
2019	Glenfield Rovers		
2019	Waitakere City		
2020	Metro		
2021–	Onehunga-Mangere		
- * Club domestic league appearances and goals

Maksim Manko (Russian: Максим Манько, Spanish: Maksim Mankó; born 11 May 1989 in Ukraine) is a New Zealand footballer who currently plays for NRFL Division 1 club Onehunga-Mangere United.

== Career ==
In 2012, he signed for Sportivo Dock Sud. In 2013, Manko signed for Santos de Guápiles. Kn 2014, he signed for Waitakere United.
