= Daniel Koprivcic =

New Zealand footballer

Personal information
- Full name: Daniel Koprivcic
- Date of birth: 3 August 1981 (age 45)
- Place of birth: Osijek, SFR Yugoslavia
- Height: 1.82 m (6 ft 0 in)
- Position: Striker

Senior career*
| Years | Team | Apps | (Gls) |
| 2006–2009 | Waitakere United | | |
| 2009–2014 | Auckland City | 73 | (25) |
- * Club domestic league appearances and goals as of 27 August 2015

Daniel Koprivcic (born 3 August 1981) is a retired footballer who played for Auckland City and Waitakere United in the New Zealand Football Championship (NZFC). He scored many goals for former clubs Waitakere United and Auckland City in not only the national league but the Oceania Champions League. He holds the record as the only player to participate in the FIFA Club World Cup six times.

== Early life ==
Koprivcic was born in Croatia and emigrated to New Zealand with his family in his early teens in 1995.

== Club career ==
=== Early career ===
Koprivcic played his early football for Central United in Auckland, later moving to Mangere United.

=== Waitakere United ===
He played for NZFC club Waitakere United from 2006–2009 and also appeared for the club in the 2007 FIFA Club World Cup, and the 2008 FIFA Club World Cup for Waitakere.

=== Auckland City ===
In 2009, he moved to Auckland City FC where he scored 4 goals in 13 appearances, as well as notching up 6 appearances in the 2009–10 OFC Champions League and scoring 7 goals. His most valuable time at Auckland City came when he was selected to represent the team at the 2009 FIFA Club World Cup in which Auckland City finished 5th out of 7th, the best an Oceania team had ever finished.

At the 2011 FIFA Club World Cup, he became the first player to compete at four Club World Cups. He went on to make two further tournament appearances, his last at the 2013 competition.

Koprivcic retired in 2014.

== International career ==
In 2003 Koprivcic was called up for an Under-23 international between New Zealand U-23 and Japan U-23 in Kobe. He came on as a substitute in a 4–0 loss.

== Honours ==
=== Club ===
With Waitakere United

- New Zealand Football Championship Premiers: 2007
- New Zealand Football Championship Champions 2007, 2008
- FIFA Club World Cup 7th: 2007, 2008
- OFC Champions League Champions: 2007, 2008

With Auckland City FC

- FIFA Club World Cup 5th: 2009

=== Individual ===
- OFC Champions League Golden Ball: 2011
- Daniel Koprivcic has the record number of participations in the FIFA Club World Cup, taking part in the six tournaments: 2007, 2008, 2009, 2011, 2012 and 2013
