= Michael Mouauri =

Cook Islands footballer

Personal information
- Date of birth: 5 August 1967 (age 59)
- Place of birth: Cook Islands
- Position: Defender

Team information
- Current team: Nikao Sokattack

Senior career*
Years	Team	Apps	(Gls)
1995	Nikao Sokattack		

International career^{‡}
1996–	Cook Islands	2	(0)
- * Club domestic league appearances and goals as of 29 July 2013 ‡ National team caps and goals as of 29 July 2013

Michael Mouauri (born 5 August 1967) is a former Cook Islands footballer and football referee who played as a defender. He was lastly known to played for Nikao Sokattack F.C. in the Cook Islands Round Cup and the Cook Islands national football team.

He officiated in the 2004 Summer Olympics as a linesman in 2 matches.
