= Auckland City FC =

New Zealand football club

Auckland City
- Full name: Auckland City Football Club
- Nicknames: The Navy Blues; City
- Short name: ACFC
- Founded: 3 February 2004; 22 years ago
- Ground: Kiwitea Street
- Capacity: 3,500
- Coordinates: 36°53′51″S 174°44′13″E
- Chairman: Ivan Vuksich
- Head coach: Rudy Mozr
- League: National League
- 2026: Northern League, 3rd of 12; National League, TBD
- Website: aucklandcityfc.com
Home colours	Away colours	Third colours

Auckland City Football Club is an association football club based in the suburb of Sandringham in Auckland, New Zealand. The football club was founded in 2004 following the inception of the New Zealand Football Championship. They currently compete in the National League.

Auckland City have established themselves as a major force in both New Zealand and Oceania, having won eleven New Zealand Football Championship and 14 OFC Champions League titles. The club is the most successful in Oceania, having won seven consecutive OFC Champions League titles between 2011 and 2017 – the most consecutive continental titles of any football team in history. This has resulted in Auckland becoming a regular fixture at the FIFA Club World Cup, famously achieving a third-placed finish in the 2014 edition. Auckland City's youth team play in the New Zealand Youth National League, and are the most successful team in national youth competition history with seven titles.

Auckland City currently play their home matches at Kiwitea Street in Sandringham, New Zealand. Their regular kit colours are faintly striped royal blue shirts and shorts with white socks. The current crest, in use since the club's inception, features the Sky Tower, an iconic Auckland landmark. The club has a strong Croatian influence, being associated with and playing at the same stadium as Central United (formed in 1962 by Dalmatian immigrants).

== History ==
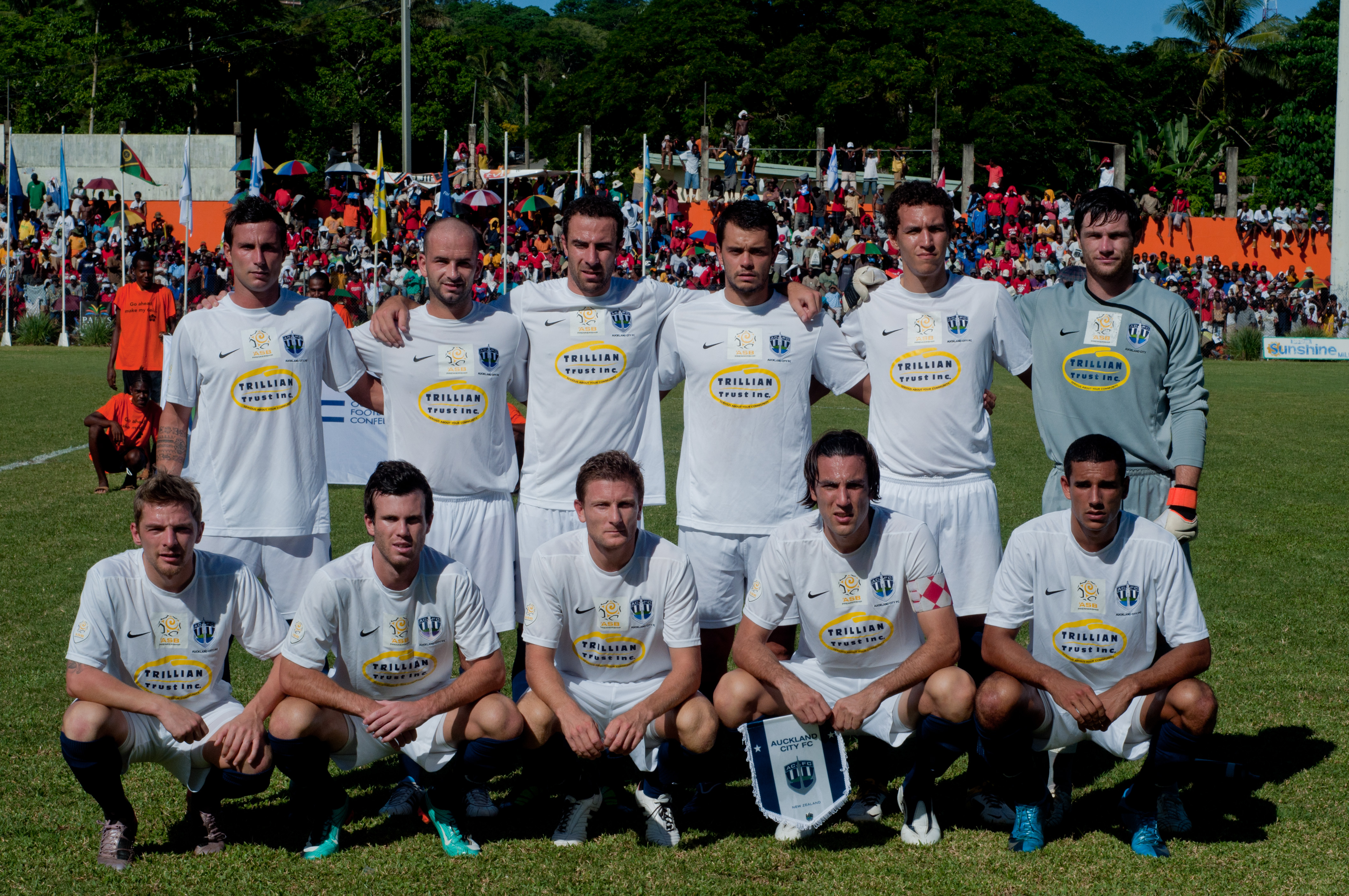
The Auckland City team in 2011

Auckland City has won the New Zealand Football Championship regular season twelve times, and the Grand Final eight times. They represented the Oceania Football Confederation (OFC) in the OFC Champions League, which they won most recently in 2025 for the 13th time. With a third place in 2014, they also became the only OFC team to reach the semi-finals of the FIFA Club World Cup. They are also the only team to win the continental treble four times.

In 2017, Auckland City were invited to play in the Lunar New Year Cup, a friendly tournament hosted in Hong Kong. Auckland City defeated South Korean champions FC Seoul in the semifinal, before defeating Hong Kong side Kitchee in the final to lift the trophy. Auckland City were again invited for the 2019 edition, falling to Chinese Super League club Shandong Luneng 2–1.

Following the conclusion of the 2018–19 season, in which Auckland City won all but one game in their undefeated season but fell short in both the OFC Champions League and the league playoffs, long-term manager Ramon Tribulietx brought his association with the club to an end and was replaced by Team Wellington coach José Figueira ahead of the 2019–20 season.

After the first season of the New Zealand National League Auckland City finished 1st in the Northern League but didn't get to play in the championship phase due to COVID-19 affecting the Auckland Region. The club then announced that Albert Riera would take over as head coach for the next season.

=== FIFA Club World Cup ===
==== 2009 ====
Auckland City overcame local champions Al Ahli 2–0 in the opening play-off match, with goals by Adam Dickinson and Chad Coombes. In their quarter final clash against CONCACAF champions Atlante of Mexico, the side lost 0–3.

The play-off for fifth and sixth place was described by coach Paul Posa as "the greatest night in the history of Auckland City Football Club", as the team defeated CAF Champions League winners TP Mazembe of the Democratic Republic of Congo 3–2. The goal scorers on this special occasion were Jason Hayne with two and Riki van Steeden.

These historic victories were the first recorded by a New Zealand team at the Club World Cup, and the first by an amateur side at this tournament. This was also the first time that a senior men's representative team from New Zealand has recorded a victory in a world FIFA competition.

==== 2014 ====

2014 FIFA Club World Cup third-placed playoff starting lineup

Auckland City played Moroccan league champions Moghreb Tétouan in a play-off for the quarter-finals on 10 December. The match finished goalless, with Auckland winning 4–3 in a penalty shoot-out and qualifying for a quarter-final clash against CAF Champions League winners ES Sétif. Auckland City defeated ES Sétif 1–0, courtesy of a John Irving goal, and advanced to the semi-finals for the first time ever.

Auckland played Copa Libertadores champions San Lorenzo in the semifinals, but lost 2–1. A shock seemed possible when a second-half goal from Ángel Berlanga cancelled out Pablo Barrientos' first-half strike for San Lorenzo, but substitute Mauro Matos netted San Lorenzo's winner in extra time.

They finished the tournament with a historic 4–2 penalty shootout win over CONCACAF Champions League winners Cruz Azul in the third-place playoff after a 1–1 draw at full time, with substitute Sanni Issa scoring the ultimate penalty just days after signing for the club. The result gained the side worldwide acclaim, as the team of part-timers and amateurs defied all expectations in the competition. Club stalwart and defender Ivan Vicelich came third in the Golden Ball award for best player at the tournament, behind Cristiano Ronaldo and Sergio Ramos of Real Madrid.

==== 2025 ====
Auckland qualified for the only spot allocated to the OFC in the upcoming 2025 FIFA Club World Cup, the first edition to be held under the new expanded format. They were drawn into Group C, where they lost 10–0 to Bayern Munich and 6–0 to Benfica. In the final match of the group stage, Auckland City achieved a 1–1 draw against Boca Juniors. Auckland earned $3.58 million USD for participating in the competition and another $1 million USD for securing a draw with Boca Juniors.

== Colours and badge ==
Auckland's traditional home kit – first used 2004–05

Auckland City's regular kit colours are faintly chequered navy blue shirts, navy blue shorts with white socks. The current crest features the Sky Tower and Rangitoto Island along with the Waitematā Harbour all iconic Auckland landmarks. It also features an anchor to acknowledge the city of Auckland's long maritime history and a yellow and white checkerboard to acknowledge the club's original roots being founded upon sister club Central United FC which was formed in 1962.

== Stadium ==
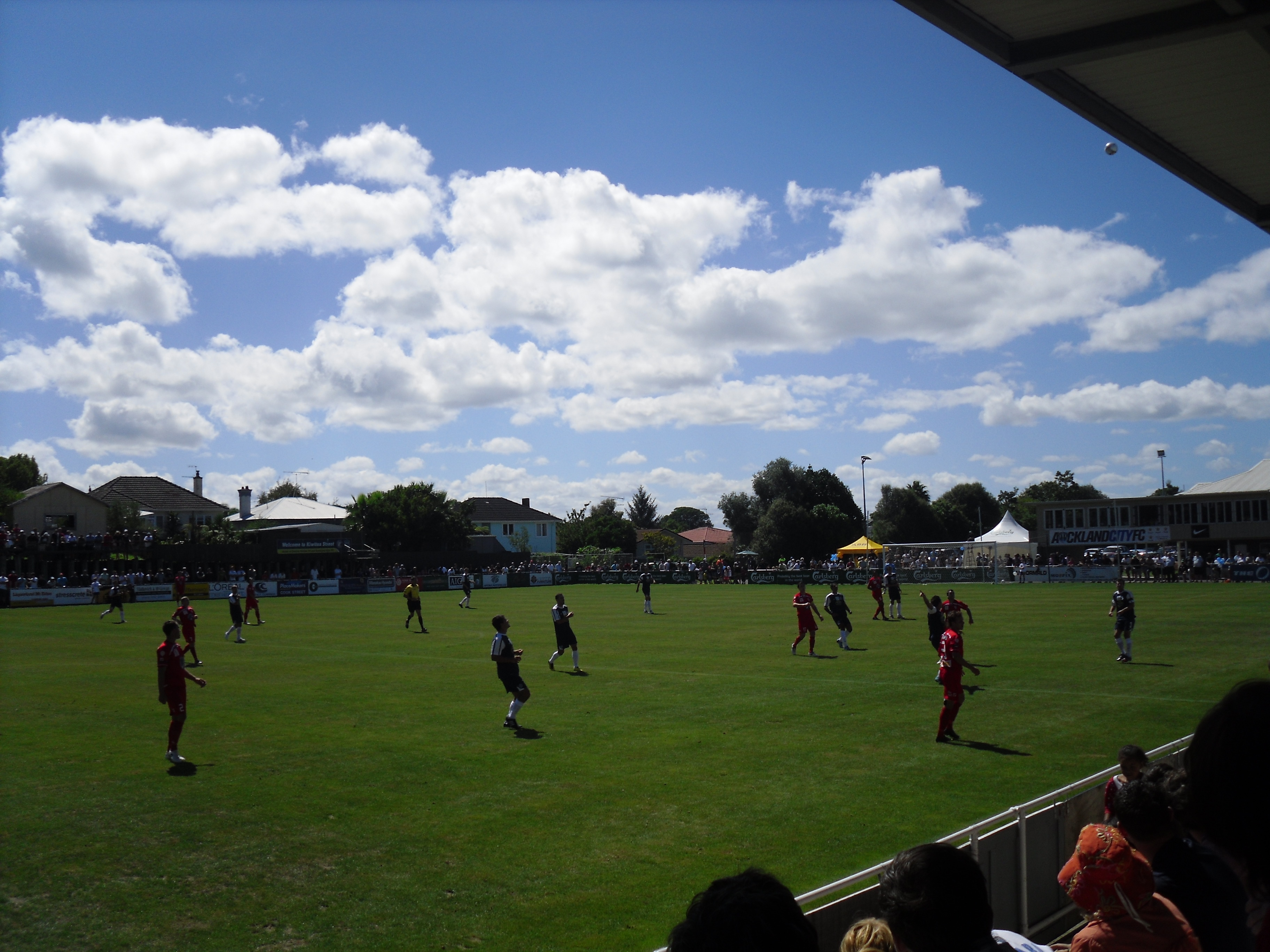
Kiwitea Street, home ground of Auckland City

Freyberg Field, then a public park, was made available for use as a football field in 1965 for tenants Central United. What became known as Kiwitea Street, was made available to Auckland City following their foundation in 2004. Since then, the amenities at Kiwitea Street have been overhauled, including a new clubrooms and a resurfaced pitch in 2007.

The stadium seats 250 spectators, with additional standing room.

== Rivalries ==
- Waitakere United (2004–2021) (Auckland derby):
- Auckland United (Dominion Road derby):

Club	Pld	W	D	L	GF	GA	GD
Auckland City	14	9	2	3	26	14	+12
Auckland United	14	3	2	9	14	26	–12

- Wellington Olympic (Mediterranean Cup):

Club	Pld	W	D	L	GF	GA	GD
Auckland City	13	7	4	2	24	19	+5
Wellington Olympic	13	2	4	7	19	24	–5

== Players ==
=== First-team squad ===
As of 25 April 2026

Note: Flags indicate national team as defined under FIFA eligibility rules; some limited exceptions apply. Players may hold more than one non-FIFA nationality.

No.	Pos.	Nation	Player
1	GK	ENG	Lewis Caunter
2	MF	NZL	Mario Ilich (captain)
3	DF	NZL	Adam Mitchell
4	DF	NZL	Christian Gray
5	DF	NZL	Nathan Rostron
6	FW	NZL	Kieren Richards
7	FW	CZE	Michal Doudera
8	MF	ESP	Gerard Garriga
9	FW	NZL	Angus Kilkolly
10	FW	NZL	Dylan Manickum
11	FW	NZL	Ryan De Vries
12	DF	KOS	Regont Murati

No.	Pos.	Nation	Player
13	DF	NZL	Nathan Lobo
14	FW	CHI	Nicolas Zambrano
16	MF	NZL	Fergus Gillion
17	MF	NZL	Ryan Watson
18	GK	FIJ	Areya Prasad
19	DF	NZL	Rhys Davies
20	FW	CZE	Pavel Osmančík
21	FW	NZL	Bono Kačurov
22	FW	CHN	Zhou Tong
23	DF	NZL	Alfred Rogers
24	GK	NZL	Matthew Foord
27	FW	NZL	Thomas Golding

== Club officials ==
=== Technical staff ===
As of 7 May 2026

Position	Staff
Head coach	(Czech Republic) Rudy Mozr
Assistant coach	(New Zealand) Ivan Vicelich
Assistant coach	(New Zealand) Alan Shaker
Assistant coach	(New Zealand) Karlo Pavić
Goalkeeper coach	(New Zealand) Adam Bannister
Physio	(New Zealand) Matt Payne

== Managers ==
List of Auckland City managers
Name	Nationality	From	To	Ref
Allan Jones	England	1 July 2004	30 June 2006	
Roger Wilkinson	New Zealand	2006		
Paul Marshall	New Zealand	1 July 2006	30 June 2007	
Colin Tuaa	New Zealand	1 July 2007	9 December 2008	
Paul Posa	New Zealand	10 December 2008	30 June 2010	
Aaron McFarland Ramon Tribulietx	New Zealand Spain	1 July 2010	30 June 2011	
Ramon Tribulietx	Spain	1 July 2011	30 June 2019	
José Figueira	England	1 July 2019	30 November 2021	
Albert Riera	Spain	1 December 2021	20 January 2025	
Paul Posa	New Zealand	21 January 2025	15 December 2025	
Rudy Mozr	Czech Republic	16 December 2025	Present	

== Notable former players ==
The following players gained international caps for their respective countries. Players listed in bold represented their countries while playing for Auckland City.

- (Argentina) Emiliano Tade
- (Japan) Takuya Iwata
- (Japan) Teruo Iwamoto
- (South Africa) Keryn Jordan
- (South Africa) Grant Young
- (South Africa) Liam Jordan
- (South Korea) Lee Ki-hyung
- (Solomon Islands) **Micah Lea'alafa**
- (Solomon Islands) **Henry Fa'arodo**
- (Solomon Islands) **George Suri**
- (Fiji) **Roy Krishna**
- (Fiji) **Salesh Kumar**
- (Vanuatu) **Brian Kaltak**
- (Pakistan) **Haris Zeb**
- (Papua New Guinea) David Browne
- (New Zealand) **James Pritchett**
- **(New Zealand) Cameron Howieson**
- (New Zealand) Cole Peverley
- (New Zealand) **Paul Urlovic**
- (New Zealand) Nikko Boxall
- (New Zealand) Michael Boxall
- (New Zealand) **Clayton Lewis**
- (New Zealand) **Tim Payne**
- (New Zealand) Myer Bevan
- (New Zealand) **Jacob Spoonley**
- (New Zealand) **Cameron Howieson**
- (New Zealand) **Ian Hogg**
- (New Zealand) Tom Doyle
- (New Zealand) Sean Douglas
- (New Zealand) **Adam McGeorge**
- (New Zealand) **Jeff Campbell**
- (New Zealand) Dalton Wilkins
- (New Zealand) **Te Atawhai Hudson-Wihongi**
- (New Zealand) Liam Graham
- (New Zealand) **Tamati Williams**
- (New Zealand) **Chad Coombes**
- (New Zealand) Dave Mulligan
- (New Zealand) **Ryan De Vries**
- (New Zealand) **Ivan Vicelich**
- (New Zealand) Matthew Ridenton
- (New Zealand) Moses Dyer
- (New Zealand) Kris Bright
- (New Zealand) Ross Nicholson
- (New Zealand) Jonathan Perry
- (New Zealand) Harshae Raniga
- (New Zealand) Callum McCowatt
- (New Zealand) Logan Rogerson

== Season by season record ==
=== NZ Premiership ===
Season	Division	League										Chatham Cup	Charity Cup	Other competitions		Top scorer	
Season	Division	P	W	D	L	F	A	GD	Pts	Pos	Finals	Chatham Cup	Charity Cup	OFC	FIFA	Name	Goals
2004–05	Premiership	21	14	4	3	53	24	+29	46	1st	1st	— (Note: As a franchise team, Auckland City FC were ineligible to play in the Chatham Cup, New Zealand's national knockout cup competition.)	—N/a	GS	—N/a	(South Africa) Grant Young	15
2005–06	Premiership	21	16	0	5	63	28	+35	48	1st	1st	—	—N/a	W	—N/a	(South Africa) Keryn Jordan	22
2006–07	Premiership	21	12	6	3	50	30	+20	42	3rd	1st	—	—N/a	GS	6th	(South Africa) Grant Young	11
2007–08	Premiership	21	16	2	3	44	16	+28	50	2nd	EF	—	—N/a	GS	—N/a	(Scotland) Bryan Little	8
2008–09	Premiership	14	8	1	5	27	15	+12	25	2nd	1st	—	—N/a	W	—N/a	(South Africa) Keryn Jordan, (New Zealand) Paul Urlovic	5
2009–10	Premiership	14	9	4	1	33	13	+20	31	1st	SF	—	—N/a	GS	5th	(New Zealand) Jason Hayne	7
2010–11	Premiership	14	9	3	2	29	12	+17	30	2nd	2nd	—	—N/a	W	—N/a	(Croatia) Daniel Koprivcic	7
2011–12	Premiership	14	11	3	0	43	11	+32	36	1st	SF	—	W	W	7th	(Spain) Manel Expósito	9
2012–13	Premiership	14	10	3	1	40	13	+27	33	2nd	2nd	—	2nd	W	7th	(Spain) Manel Expósito	11
2013–14	Premiership	14	10	3	1	40	12	+28	33	1st	1st	—	W	W	7th	(Argentina) Emiliano Tade ♦	17
2014–15	Premiership	14	12	0	2	39	14	+25	42	1st	1st	—	2nd	W	3rd	(Papua New Guinea) David Browne	7
2015–16	Premiership	14	12	2	0	43	12	+31	38	1st	2nd	—	W	W	7th	(New Zealand) Ryan De Vries ♦	15
2016–17	Premiership	18	11	3	4	35	15	+20	36	1st	2nd	—	W	W	7th	(Argentina) Emiliano Tade	13
2017–18	Premiership	18	12	4	2	41	12	+29	40	1st	1st	—	2nd	SF	7th	(Argentina) Emiliano Tade ♦	18
2018–19	Premiership	18	17	1	0	46	18	+28	52	1st	SF	—	W	SF	—N/a	(Spain) Javier López Iglesias	8
2019–20	Premiership	16	11	4	1	42	15	+27	37	1st	— (Note: Due to the COVID-19 pandemic, the Final Series was not held.)	—	W	— (Note: On 4 September 2020, OFC announced that the competition was abandoned due to the COVID-19 pandemic.)	—N/a	(New Zealand) Myer Bevan ♦	15
2020–21	Premiership	14	8	4	2	27	13	+14	28	1st	2nd	—	W	— (Note: The tournament, which would usually be played in the first half of the year, were originally postponed to start no earlier than 1 July due to border closures throughout the Pacific caused by the COVID-19 pandemic. On 4 June 2021, the OFC announced that the tournament had been cancelled, and no champions would be awarded for the second season in a row. The OFC representative at the 2021 FIFA Club World Cup in Japan, which would originally be the winners of the 2021 OFC Champions League, was confirmed to be Auckland City on 3 August 2021 following a decision by the OFC Executive Committee, based on sporting merit principles which took into consideration the final placing of every member association's national league champion and runner-up in each OFC Champions League between 2016 and 2020, with the results combined to determine an overall ranking, and applied to the clubs nominated by their member association as the champion or runner-up from their respective national leagues to qualify for the 2021 OFC Champions League. However, on 31 December 2021, FIFA announced that Auckland City had withdrawn from the competition due to the COVID-19 pandemic and related quarantine measures required by the New Zealand authorities. As a result, AS Pirae were nominated as the OFC's representative in their place.)	—N/a	(New Zealand) Logan Rogerson	8

=== National League ===
Season	Qualifying league	League									National League									Chatham Cup	Other competitions			Top scorer	
Season	Qualifying league	P	W	D	L	F	A	GD	Pts	Pos	P	W	D	L	F	A	GD	Pts	Pos	Chatham Cup	OFC	FIFA (Note: Includes results in FIFA Intercontinental Cup.)		Name	Goals
2021	Northern League	18	15	1	2	63	19	+44	46	1st	Cancelled (Note: 2021 National League season cancelled due to COVID-19 pandemic in Northern regions;. Championship played as South Central Series, with the northern clubs missing in the first edition.)									QF	—N/a	—N/a		(New Zealand) Angus Kilkolly	18
2022	Northern League	22	20	1	1	68	16	+52	61	1st	9	7	1	1	20	9	+11	22	1st	W	W	7th		(Argentina) Emiliano Tade	17
2023	Northern League	22	19	3	0	64	9	+55	60	1st	9	7	0	2	19	12	+7	21	2nd	R4	W	7th		(New Zealand) Ryan De Vries	20
2024	Northern League	22	16	3	3	53	21	+32	51	1st	9	6	1	2	20	10	+10	19	1st	2nd	W	6th		(New Zealand) Liam Gillion	10
2025	Northern League	22	12	4	6	35	24	+11	40	4th	10	6	2	2	19	14	+5	20	1st	R3	W	GS	6th	(New Zealand) Myer Bevan	10
2026	Northern League	22	14	3	5	51	19	+32	45	3rd	Qualifield								TBD	QF	W	—N/a			

Season	League											Chatham Cup	Continental	Top scorer	
Season	Division	Tier	P	W	D	L	GF	GA	GD	Pts	Pos	Chatham Cup	Continental	Name	Goals
2027	National League	1	To be determined								TBD of 12				

Chart of yearly ladder positions for Auckland City in New Zealand premier football division

	Champions
	Runners-up
	Third Place
♦	Top scorer in competition
EF	Elimination finals
SF	Semi-finals
	Participation in FIFA Club World Cup
	Participation in FIFA Intercontinental Cup

== International competitions record ==
=== Continental ===
==== Club Championship/Champions League ====
Club Championship/Champions League results
Season	Round	Club		Home	Away	Aggregate
2005	Preliminary round	(American Samoa)	Manumea	w/d (Note: Auckland City received a bye because Manumea were withdrawn by the Oceania Football Confederation.)		
2005	Group A	(Australia)	Sydney FC	2–3		3rd
2005	Group A	(French Polynesia)	AS Pirae	0–1		3rd
2005	Group A	(Papua New Guinea)	Sobou	6–1		3rd
2006	Group A	(Papua New Guinea)	Sobou	7–0		1st
2006	Group A	(Solomon Islands)	Marist Fire	3–1		1st
2006	Group A	(French Polynesia)	AS Pirae	1–0		1st
2006	Semi-finals	(Fiji)	Nokia Eagles	9–1		
2006	Final	(French Polynesia)	AS Pirae	3–1		
2007	Group A	(New Zealand)	Waitakere United	2–2	2–2	2nd
2007	Group A	(New Caledonia)	Mont-Dore	4–0	2–0	2nd
2007–08	Group A	(New Zealand)	Waitakere United	0–1	1–1	2nd
2007–08	Group A	(French Polynesia)	A.S. Manu-Ura	6–0	1–0	2nd
2008–09	Group A	(New Zealand)	Waitakere United	2–2	3–1	1st
2008–09	Group A	(Vanuatu)	Port Vila Sharks	8–1	2–0	1st
2008–09	Final	(Solomon Islands)	Koloale	2–2	7–2	9–4
2009–10	Group A	(New Zealand)	Waitakere United	2–2	1–1	2nd
2009–10	Group A	(New Caledonia)	AS Magenta	2–1	1–1	2nd
2009–10	Group A	(French Polynesia)	A.S. Manu-Ura	5–0	2–0	2nd
2010–11	Group B	(New Caledonia)	AS Magenta	3–0	1–0	1st
2010–11	Group B	(New Zealand)	Waitakere United	1–1	1–0	1st
2010–11	Group B	(French Polynesia)	A.S. Tefana	1–1	5–0	1st
2010–11	Final	(Vanuatu)	Amicale	2–1	4–0	6–1
2011–12	Group B	(Papua New Guinea)	Hekari United	2–0	1–1	1st
2011–12	Group B	(Solomon Islands)	Koloale	7–3	4–1	1st
2011–12	Group B	(Vanuatu)	Amicale	3–2	0–1	1st
2011–12	Final	(French Polynesia)	A.S. Tefana	2–1	1–0	3–1
2012–13	Group B	(New Zealand)	Waitakere United	0–1	3–1	2nd
2012–13	Group B	(French Polynesia)	A.S. Dragon	1–3	1–1	2nd
2012–13	Group B	(New Caledonia)	Mont-Dore	12–2	2–0	2nd
2012–13	Semi-finals	(Fiji)	Ba	6–1	1–0	7–1
2012–13	Final	(New Zealand)	Waitakere United	2–1		
2013–14	Group B	(Fiji)	Nadi	3–0		2nd
2013–14	Group B	(French Polynesia)	A.S. Dragon	3–0		2nd
2013–14	Group B	(Vanuatu)	Amicale	0–1		2nd
2013–14	Semi-finals	(French Polynesia)	AS Pirae	3–0	1–2	4–2
2013–14	Final	(Vanuatu)	Amicale	2–1	1–1	3–2
2014–15	Group B	(Fiji)	Suva	3–0		1st
2014–15	Group B	(Solomon Islands)	Western United	3–0		1st
2014–15	Group B	(Vanuatu)	Amicale	3–0		1st
2014–15	Semi-finals	(New Caledonia)	Gaïtcha FCN	1–0		
2014–15	Final	(New Zealand)	Team Wellington	1–1 (4–3 p.)		
2016	Group A	(Papua New Guinea)	Lae City Dwellers	2–1		1st
2016	Group A	(Solomon Islands)	Solomon Warriors	4–0		1st
2016	Group A	(Vanuatu)	Amicale	3–1		1st
2016	Semi-finals	(French Polynesia)	A.S. Tefana	4–2		
2016	Final	(New Zealand)	Team Wellington	3–0		
2017	Group C	(Papua New Guinea)	Lae City Dwellers	2–0		1st
2017	Group C	(Solomon Islands)	Western United	2–1		1st
2017	Group C	(Vanuatu)	Malampa Revivors	11–0		1st
2017	Semi-finals	(French Polynesia)	A.S. Tefana	2–0	2–0	4–0
2017	Final	(New Zealand)	Team Wellington	3–0	2–0	5–0
2018	Group C	(French Polynesia)	Vénus	7–0		1st
2018	Group C	(Papua New Guinea)	Madang	5–0		1st
2018	Group C	(Fiji)	Lautoka	1–0		1st
2018	Quarter-finals	(Solomon Islands)	Solomon Warriors	2–0		
2018	Semi-finals	(New Zealand)	Team Wellington	0–0	2–2	2–2 (a)
2019	Group D	(New Caledonia)	AS Magenta	2–1		1st
2019	Group D	(Cook Islands)	Tupapa Maraerenga	15–0		1st
2019	Group D	(Solomon Islands)	Solomon Warriors	6–0		1st
2019	Quarter-finals	(Papua New Guinea)	Toti City	4–0		
2019	Semi-finals	(New Caledonia)	AS Magenta	1–2		
2020	Group D (Note: On 4 September 2020, OFC announced that the competition was abandoned due to the COVID-19 pandemic.)	(Fiji)	Ba	6–0		1st
2020	Group D	(French Polynesia)	Vénus	1–0		1st
2020	Group D	(Samoa)	Lupe o le Soaga	2–0		1st
2022	Group B	(New Caledonia)	Hienghène Sport	5–0		1st
2022	Group B	(Fiji)	Rewa	3–0		1st
2022	Group B	(Cook Islands)	Nikao Sokattack	4–1		1st
2022	Semi-finals	(Solomon Islands)	Central Coast	2–0		
2022	Final	(French Polynesia)	Vénus	3–0		
2023	National play-offs	(New Zealand)	Wellington Olympic	5–3	1–1	6–4
2023	Group A	(Solomon Islands)	Solomon Warriors	3–1		1st
2023	Group A	(Fiji)	Suva	3–1		1st
2023	Group A	(Samoa)	Lupe o le Soaga	3–0 (w/d (Note: The match was cancelled due to injuries in the Lupe ole Soaga squad. Lupe ole Soaga SC will have all its matches cancelled and considered null and void.))		1st
2023	Semi-finals	(Vanuatu)	Ifira Black Bird	2–2 (5–4 p.)		
2023	Final	(Fiji)	Suva	4–2 (a.e.t.)		
2024	National play-offs	(New Zealand)	Wellington Olympic	1–0	3–3	4–3
2024	Group A	(Fiji)	Rewa	2–2		1st
2024	Group A	(Papua New Guinea)	Hekari United	1–0		1st
2024	Group A	(Solomon Islands)	Solomon Warriors	5–0		1st
2024	Semi-finals	(New Caledonia)	AS Magenta	1–0		
2024	Final	(French Polynesia)	AS Pirae	4–0		
2025	Group A	(French Polynesia)	AS Pirae	1–0		1st
2025	Group A	(New Caledonia)	Tiga Sport	2–0		1st
2025	Group A	(Fiji)	Rewa	1–1		1st
2025	Semi-finals	(Vanuatu)	Ifira Black Bird	2–0		
2025	Final	(Papua New Guinea)	Hekari United	2–0		
2026	Group A	(Solomon Islands)	Central Coast	2–1		1st
2026	Group A	(New Caledonia)	Tiga Sport	1–0		1st
2026	Group A	(French Polynesia)	Vénus	4–3		1st
2026	Semi-finals	(Fiji)	Rewa	3–1		
2026	Final	(Solomon Islands)	Central Coast	2–0		

==== OFC President's Cup ====
Season	Round	Club		Home	Away	Aggregate
2014	Group A	Singapore U23		4–0		1st
2014	Group A	(Cayman Islands)	Bodden Town	9–0		1st
2014	Final	(Vanuatu)	Amicale	2–1		

==== Intercontinental Cup / FIFA Club World Cup ====
Season	Competition	Round	Club	Score
2006	FIFA Club World Cup	Quarter-finals	(Egypt) Al-Ahly	0–2 (N)
2006	FIFA Club World Cup	Fifth place play-off	(South Korea) Jeonbuk Hyundai Motors	0–3 (N)
2009	FIFA Club World Cup	Quarter-finals play-off	(United Arab Emirates) Al-Ahli	2–0 (A)
2009	FIFA Club World Cup	Quarter-finals	(Mexico) Atlante	0–3 (N)
2009	FIFA Club World Cup	Fifth place match	(Democratic Republic of the Congo) TP Mazembe	3–2 (N)
2011	FIFA Club World Cup	Quarter-finals play-off	(Japan) Kashiwa Reysol	0–2 (A)
2012	FIFA Club World Cup	Quarter-finals play-off	(Japan) Sanfrecce Hiroshima	0–1 (A)
2013	FIFA Club World Cup	Quarter-finals play-off	(Morocco) Raja Casablanca	1–2 (A)
2014	FIFA Club World Cup	Quarter-finals play-off	(Morocco) Moghreb Tetouan	0–0 (4–3 p) (A)
2014	FIFA Club World Cup	Quarter-finals	(Algeria) ES Sétif	1–0 (N)
2014	FIFA Club World Cup	Semi-finals	(Argentina) San Lorenzo	1–2 (a.e.t.) (N)
2014	FIFA Club World Cup	Third place match	(Mexico) Cruz Azul	1–1 (4–2 p) (N)
2015	FIFA Club World Cup	Quarter-finals play-off	(Japan) Sanfrecce Hiroshima	0–2 (A)
2016	FIFA Club World Cup	Quarter-finals play-off	(Japan) Kashima Antlers	1–2 (A)
2017	FIFA Club World Cup	Quarter-finals play-off	(United Arab Emirates) Al-Jazira	0–1 (A)
2020	FIFA Club World Cup	Withdrew due to COVID-19 pandemic		
2022	FIFA Club World Cup	Quarter-finals play-off	(Egypt) Al Ahly	0–3 (N)
2023	FIFA Club World Cup	Quarter-finals play-off	(Saudi Arabia) Al-Ittihad	0–3 (A)
2024	FIFA Intercontinental Cup	African–Asian–Pacific Cup play-off	(United Arab Emirates) Al Ain	2–6 (A)
2025	FIFA Club World Cup	Group C	(Germany) Bayern Munich	0–10 (N)
2025	FIFA Club World Cup	Group C	(Portugal) Benfica	0–6 (N)
2025	FIFA Club World Cup	Group C	(Argentina) Boca Juniors	1–1 (N)
2025	FIFA Intercontinental Cup	African–Asian–Pacific Cup play-off	(Egypt) Pyramids	0–3 (A)

===== FIFA Club World Cup statistics =====
Year	FIFA Club World Cup								Top goalscorer		Managers
Year	Country	Pld	W	D	L	GF	GA	Place	Player	Goals	Managers
2006	Japan	2	0	0	2	0	5	6th	—N/a	0	Allan Jones
2009	United Arab Emirates	3	2	0	1	5	5	5th	Jason Hayne	2	Paul Posa
2011	Japan	1	0	0	1	0	2	7th	—N/a	0	Ramon Tribulietx
2012	Japan	1	0	0	1	0	1	7th	—N/a	0	Ramon Tribulietx
2013	Morocco	1	0	0	1	1	2	7th	Roy Krishna	1	Ramon Tribulietx
2014	Morocco	4	1	2	1	3	3	3rd	Berlanga, De Vries, Irving	1	Ramon Tribulietx
2015	Japan	1	0	0	1	0	2	7th	—N/a	0	Ramon Tribulietx
2016	Japan	1	0	0	1	1	2	7th	Kim Dae-wook	1	Ramon Tribulietx
2017	United Arab Emirates	1	0	0	1	0	1	7th	—N/a	0	Ramon Tribulietx
2022	Morocco	1	0	0	1	0	3	7th	—N/a	0	Albert Riera
2023	Saudi Arabia	1	0	0	1	0	3	7th	—N/a	0	Albert Riera
2025	United States	3	0	1	2	1	17	27th	Christian Gray	1	Paul Posa

===== FIFA Intercontinental Cup statistics =====
Year	FIFA Intercontinental Cup							Top goalscorer		Managers
Year	Pld	W	D	L	F	A	Place	Player	Goals	Managers
2024	1	0	0	1	2	6	6th	Bevan, Lagos	1	Albert Riera
2025	1	0	0	1	0	3	6th	—N/a	0	Paul Posa

=== All international competitions statistics ===
Auckland City FC record in international football by competition
Competition	Apps	Pld	W	D	L	F	A	GD	Win%
OFC Champions League	20	112	83	20	9	326	81	+245	74.11
OFC President's Cup	1	3	3	0	0	15	1	+14	100.00
FIFA Club World Cup	12	17	3	2	12	10	29	−19	17.65
FIFA Intercontinental Cup	2	2	0	0	2	2	9	−7	0.00
Total	35	134	89	22	23	353	120	+233	66.42

== Rankings ==
=== Club world ranking ===
As of 11 September 2025

Rank	Team	Points
459	(Bahrain) Al-Khaldiya	59.00
459	(Panama) Plaza Amador	59.00
459	(New Zealand) Auckland City	59.00
459	(Bolivia) The Strongest	59.00
459	(North Macedonia) Vardar	59.00

== Honours ==
Type	Competition	Titles	Seasons
Domestic (NZF)	NZ Football League	11	2004–05, 2005–06, 2006–07, 2008–09, 2013–14, 2014–15, 2017–18, 2019–20^{(Note: Due to the COVID-19 pandemic, the 2019–20 season was concluded after 16 rounds. The remaining two rounds of the regular season and the finals series were cancelled. Auckland City, who were leading the regular season table, were declared champions and also awarded the Minor Premiership.)}, 2022, 2024, 2025
Domestic (NZF)	Chatham Cup	1	2022
Domestic (NZF)	ASB Charity Cup	7	2011, 2013, 2015, 2016, 2018, 2019, 2020
Domestic (NZF)	Premiers of NZFC	12	2004–05, 2005–06, 2009–10, 2011–12, 2013–14, 2014–15, 2015–16, 2016–17, 2017–18, 2018–19, 2019–20, 2020–21
Regional	Northern League	4	2021, 2022, 2023, 2024
Continental (OFC)	OFC Champions League	14	2006, 2008–09, 2010–11, 2011–12, 2012–13, 2013–14, 2014–15, 2016, 2017, 2022, 2023, 2024, 2025, 2026
Continental (OFC)	OFC President's Cup	1	2014

- record

=== International ===
- FIFA Club World Cup
  - Bronze Medal (1): 2014

=== Youth team ===
- National Youth League
  - Champions (5): 2007, 2009, 2012, 2013, 2017

=== Friendlies ===
- Hong Kong Lunar New Year Cup
  - Champions (1): 2017

== See also ==
- Auckland Football Federation

== Notes ==
Chatham Cup
Preceded by Cashmere Technical	Winner; 2022 Chatham Cup	Succeeded by Christchurch United
