= Keryn Jordan =

South African soccer player

Personal information
- Full name: Keryn David Jordan
- Date of birth: 1 November 1975
- Place of birth: Pretoria, Gauteng, South Africa
- Date of death: 21 October 2013 (aged 37)
- Place of death: Pretoria, Gauteng, South Africa
- Height: 1.78 m (5 ft 10 in)
- Position: Striker

Senior career*
Years	Team	Apps	(Gls)
1994–1995	Pretoria City	7	(3)
1996–2003	Manning Rangers	94	(52)
2003–2004	Moroka Swallows	?	(8)
2004–2005	Waitakere United	21	(15)
2005–2010	Auckland City FC	79	(61)

International career
1999	South Africa	1	(0)
- * Club domestic league appearances and goals

Keryn David Jordan (1 November 1975 – 21 October 2013) was a South African footballer who primarily played as a striker during a fifteen-year career.

== Club career ==
=== Early career ===
He started his career in his native South Africa at Pretoria City, before transferring to Manning Rangers where he won the golden boot during the 1997–98 Premier Soccer League season with 11 goals. In the 2003/2004 season, he also led with 8 goals.

=== Waitakere United ===
Jordan then moved to New Zealand, intending to play for the New Zealand Knights in the newly formed Australian and New Zealand A-League. He was unsuccessful in this and signed with new New Zealand Football Championship team Waitakere United instead. In his first season with the club (2004/2005), he scored 15 goals in the 21 rounds, and earned the Golden Boot.

== International career ==
Jordan earned one cap for South Africa at senior international level, in 1999.

== Illness and death ==
In 2008, after an unexplained three months on the sideline, Jordan announced that he had been suffering from cancer for three years. He had initially been worried that it would interfere with his application for permanent residency and New Zealand citizenship, but was treated and given the all-clear by doctors, and made his comeback in a 4–1 win against Canterbury United.

On 19 March 2010, Jordan announced his retirement from all levels of domestic and international football, citing ongoing knee injuries. Jordan had not played a full game since the 2009 Club World Cup, and he felt it the right time to retire, after what he conceded was an ultimately successful career.

Jordan died of cancer on 21 October 2013, aged 37, in his hometown of Pretoria. The cancer had started as a melanoma spot thirteen years earlier, and eventually spread to his brain.
