= New Zealand Football Championship =

New Zealand Football Championship (NZFC)
- Founded: 2004; 22 years ago
- First season: 2004–05
- Folded: 2021; 5 years ago
- Country: New Zealand
- Confederation: OFC
- Number of clubs: 8
- Level on pyramid: 1 (2004–2021)
- Domestic cup: White Ribbon Cup
- International cup: OFC Champions League
- Last champions: Team Wellington (3rd title) (2020–21)
- Current premiers: Auckland City (12th title)
- Most championships: Auckland City (8 titles)
- Most premierships: Auckland City (12 titles)
- Most appearances: Jake Butler (257 appearances)
- Top scorer: Emiliano Tade (80 goals)
- Broadcaster: Sky Sports
- Website: www.nzfc.co.nz

The New Zealand Football Championship (Māori: Te Whakataetae Whutupaoro a Aotearoa) was a men's association football league at the top of the New Zealand league system. Founded in 2004, the New Zealand Football Championship was the successor to a myriad of short-lived football leagues in the country, including the National Soccer League, the National Summer Soccer League and the New Zealand Superclub League. The league was contested by ten teams in a franchise system. For sponsorship reasons, the competition was known as the ISPS Handa Men's Premiership. From the 2021 season, it was replaced by the New Zealand National League.

The seasons used to run from October through to April, and consist of an eighteen-round regular season followed by a playoff series involving the four highest-placed teams, culminating in a Grand Final. Each season, two clubs would gain qualification to the OFC Champions League, the continental competition for the Oceania region. The league does not use a system of promotion and relegation.

Auckland City were the most successful side since the competition's inception, with twelve premierships and seven championship titles. A youth competition, called the National Youth League, runs parallel to the regular season.

== Competition format ==
There were two stages to the competition: the regular season, in which each team played each other twice for a total of 18 games; and the playoffs, in which the top four teams in the league play knockout matches in order to determine the champion.

=== Regular season ===
Each team played each other team twice: once at home, and once away. Teams score three points for a win, one for a draw, and no points for a loss. At the end of the regular season, the top four teams progress to the playoffs.

For the first four seasons, the regular season had the teams play each other three times. This was changed to a home-and-away system in 2008, due to financial difficulties affecting some clubs.

=== Playoffs ===
The playoffs consist of three matches; there were two semi-final matches, and the winners of each progress to a one-match Grand Final.

In the inaugural season, three teams took part in the playoffs. The Minor Premier (the winner of the regular season) received automatic entry to the grand final as well as hosting rights, while the second and third placed teams played a one-game preliminary final to determine entry to the grand final. The NZFC also experimented with a five team playoff in the 2005–06 season, however, this was discontinued and the league reverted to the three-team playoff system for the 2006–07 and 2007–08 seasons. The league changed to the four-team playoff system in the 2009–10 season.

=== Qualification to OFC Champions League ===
Two teams from the NZFC qualified for the OFC Champions League each season: the team that won the regular season (the "Minor Premier") and the team that won the Grand Final (the "Champion"). If the same team wins both the Minor Premiership and the Championship, the second Champions League spot is granted to the regular season runner-up. This occurred on numerous occasions; the first instance being in 2006 when Auckland City (premiers and champions) and YoungHeart Manawatu qualified, YoungHeart Manawatu not making it to the Grand Final.

No promotion and relegation existed, making it a closed league similar to the A-League in Australia and Major League Soccer in the United States.

== History ==
=== Establishment in 2004 to present ===
The New Zealand Football Championship was created as a replacement to the former New Zealand National Soccer League, a tournament involving clubs from the regional governing bodies of New Zealand Football. The NZFC was to be run as a summer league involving new clubs created solely for the new competition, with these new clubs being run jointly by existing winter clubs. The only exception to this was Napier City Rovers, whose summer club would be rebranded Hawke's Bay United during the second season, to be operated jointly by other clubs in the Hawke's Bay region.

Eleven groups bid for franchises, with the successful bids being announced on 7 April 2004 as Auckland City, Canterbury United, Napier City Rovers, Otago United, Team Wellington, Waikato FC, Waitakere United, and YoungHeart Manawatu, with Olé Madrids, East Auckland and Team Bay of Plenty being excluded. Unhappy at their exclusion, the Olé Madrids bid team took New Zealand Soccer to court, suing for damages and demanding inclusion in the competition, claiming that, whilst they met NZ Soccer's criteria for inclusion, other successful bids did not. The case was dropped by the Madrids team eight days before the commencement of the first NZFC season. The Olé Academy, previously having had a relationship with Team Wellington, currently holds an exclusive partnership with current league side Eastern Suburbs. East Auckland also considered legal action, however this was not pursued.

The first match of the competition was on 15 October 2004, with Auckland City defeating Napier City Rovers 3–1 at Park Island, Napier. Auckland City were also crowned the inaugural NZFC champions after defeating Waitakere United 3–2 in the final.

The second season saw Napier City Rovers rebrand and reorganize their NZFC team as Hawke's Bay United, forming an amalgamated franchise with other local clubs. It also saw the first instance of a NZFC team winning the O-League, with Auckland City FC defeating Tahitian team AS Pirae 3–1.

At the conclusion of the 2006–07 season, New Zealand Football granted three-season licence extensions to seven of the eight franchises – all but YoungHeart Manawatu, who had to reapply due to concerns over the club's financial and organisational situation. However, YoungHeart eventually earned reinstatement after beating out four rival bids – one based in Gisborne, one from North Shore City, and two from Manukau. Olé Madrids also applied for the licence; however they withdrew early.

On 2 September 2010, New Zealand Football announced a five-year sponsorship agreement with ASB Bank resulting in the rebranding of the New Zealand Football Championship to the ASB Premiership.

In 2013, after a review of the competition by the ASB Premiership review committee, YoungHeart Manawatu was dropped from the competition after finishing last in the previous three seasons. New Zealand Football also confirmed that a team composed of New Zealand players born on or after 1 January 1995 would take Manawatu's place in the Premiership for at least two seasons. The addition of the team – to be known as Wanderers SC – was to provide adequate preparation for New Zealand's U-20 players for the upcoming 2015 FIFA U-20 World Cup which will be hosted by New Zealand. Much confusion surrounded the initials "SC" in the Wanderers' name, as no official explanation was given as to what they stood for. It wasn't until after their first match that coach Darren Bazeley finally revealed that "SC" stood for "Special Club", saying "it acknowledges this team has arisen out of a special situation and was specially formed for the purpose."

The 2014–15 season saw the Premiership expand to nine teams for the first time in its history. Wellington Phoenix Reserves was added to the competition to provide game time for the members of the Phoenix squad who are not playing frequently for the first team in the A-League. Restrictions were also put in place for all clubs requiring that at least 50% of match day squads are players who are eligible to play for the All Whites.

After 11 full seasons, only Auckland City and Waitakere United have been crowned Premiers or Champions, with Auckland City adding their sixth premiership and sixth title in the 2014–15 season. This trend was bucked, however, in the twelfth season of the competition, as Team Wellington defeated Auckland City 4–2 after extra time in the final. The 2018–19 saw Eastern Suburbs crowned as champions for the first time, becoming the first club to win the NZFC and the New Zealand National Soccer League.

=== 2016 expansion ===
In December 2015 it was announced that the league would be expanding to 10 teams for the 2016–17 season with Eastern Suburbs from Auckland, Hamilton Wanderers from Hamilton, and Tasman United from Nelson joining the league, while WaiBop United would exit the competition.

=== Rebrandings ===
In September 2016, it was announced that the expanded league would be rebranded as the Stirling Sports Premiership.

In March 2017, it was announced that the league would be rebranded as the ISPS Handa Premiership, due to a three-year sponsorship deal with ISPS Handa.

=== National League Championship ===
In March 2021, New Zealand Football announced a change to the structure of both the premiership and the top regional leagues around the country. The four top regional leagues (NRFL Premier, Central Premier League, Mainland Premier League and the FootballSouth Premier League) would be formed into the Northern League, Central League, and the Southern League. These leagues would allow local clubs to qualify for the premiership season (now known as the National League Championship), with the top 4 teams from the Northern League, the top 3 teams from the Central League, and the top 2 teams from the Southern League making up the competition, alongside the Wellington Phoenix Reserve side. All teams that qualify plus the Phoenix Reserves, would then play a single round-robin competition between September and December.

== Clubs ==
Until 2019, the New Zealand Football Championship had no promotion or relegation, similar to leagues in Australia and the United States. A promotion and relegation system was to be introduced to the National League in 2020/2021, taking the form of a slot protection model. This model protects one National League slot for each major region of the country to protect geographic representation and maintain a pathway for all clubs into the ISPS Handa Premiership. A slot for the Wellington Phoenix's reserve side was to also be protected. Promotion and relegation were to be decided every 4 years.

Location of all clubs in New Zealand for all seasons of the league

=== Current clubs ===
Team	City, Region	Stadium	Joined	Head Coach
Auckland City	Auckland, Auckland	Kiwitea Street	2004	(England) José Figueira
Canterbury United	Christchurch, Canterbury	English Park	2004	(England) Lee Padmore
Eastern Suburbs	Auckland, Auckland	Madills Farm	2016	(New Zealand) Hoani Edwards
Hamilton Wanderers	Hamilton, Waikato	Porritt Stadium	2016	(New Zealand) Kale Herbert
Hawke's Bay United	Napier, Hawke's Bay	Bluewater Stadium	2005	(England) Bill Robertson (England) Chris Greatholder
Team Wellington	Wellington, Wellington	David Farrington Park	2004	(England) Scott Hales
Waitakere United	Whenuapai, Auckland	Fred Taylor Park	2004	(England) Paul Hobson
Wellington Phoenix Reserves	Wellington, Wellington	Newtown Park	2014	(England) Paul Temple

=== Former clubs ===
Team	City, Region	Joined	Left
YoungHeart Manawatu	Palmerston North, Manawatū-Whanganui	2004	2013
Wanderers SC	North Shore, Auckland	2013	2015
WaiBOP United	Cambridge, Waikato	2004	2016
Southern United	Dunedin, Otago	2004	2020
Tasman United	Nelson, Nelson	2016	2020

=== Name changes ===
- Napier City Rovers → Hawke's Bay United
- Otago United → Southern United
- Waikato FC → WaiBOP United

== Champions and premiers ==
Season	Regular Season				Grand Final		
Season	Premiers	Points	Runners-up	Points	Champions	Score	Runners-up
2004–05	Auckland City	46	Waitakere United	40	Auckland City	3 – 2	Waitakere United
2005–06	Auckland City	48	YoungHeart Manawatu	46	Auckland City	3 – 3 (a.e.t.); 4 – 3 (p.s.o.)	Canterbury United
2006–07	Waitakere United	47	YoungHeart Manawatu	45	Auckland City	3 – 2	Waitakere United
2007–08	Waitakere United	51	Auckland City	50	Waitakere United	2 – 0	Team Wellington
2008–09	Waitakere United	33	Auckland City	25	Auckland City	2 – 1	Waitakere United
2009–10	Auckland City	31	Waitakere United	29	Waitakere United	3 – 1	Canterbury United
2010–11	Waitakere United	36	Auckland City	30	Waitakere United	3 – 2	Auckland City
2011–12	Auckland City	36	Canterbury United	29	Waitakere United	4 – 1	Team Wellington
2012–13	Waitakere United	37	Auckland City	33	Waitakere United	4 – 3 (a.e.t.)	Auckland City
2013–14	Auckland City	33	Team Wellington	26	Auckland City	1 – 0	Team Wellington
2014–15	Auckland City	42	Team Wellington	30	Auckland City	2 – 1	Hawke's Bay United
2015–16	Auckland City	38	Hawke's Bay United	30	Team Wellington	4 – 2 (a.e.t.)	Auckland City
2016–17	Auckland City	36	Team Wellington	36	Team Wellington	2 – 1	Auckland City
2017–18	Auckland City	40	Team Wellington	37	Auckland City	1 – 0	Team Wellington
2018–19	Auckland City	52	Eastern Suburbs	40	Eastern Suburbs	3 – 0	Team Wellington
2019–20	Auckland City	37^{†}	Team Wellington	34^{†}	Auckland City	Not played^{†}	Team Wellington
2020–21	Auckland City	28	Team Wellington	26	Team Wellington	4 – 2	Auckland City

^{†} Due to the COVID-19 pandemic, the 2019–20 season was concluded after 16 rounds. The remaining two rounds of the regular season and the finals series were cancelled. Auckland City, who were leading the regular season table, were declared champions and also awarded the Minor Premiership, and qualified for the 2021 OFC Champions League together with Team Wellington, who were at second place in the regular season table.

=== Premiership winners ===
Team	Titles	Runners-up	Winning years
Auckland City	12	4	2004–05, 2005–06, 2009–10, 2011–12, 2013–14, 2014–15, 2015–16, 2016–17, 2017–18, 2018–19, 2019–20, 2020–21
Waitakere United	5	2	2006–07, 2007–08, 2008–09, 2010–11, 2012–13
Team Wellington	–	6	
YoungHeart Manawatu	–	2	
Canterbury United	–	1	
Hawke's Bay United	–	1	
Eastern Suburbs	–	1	

=== Championship winners ===
Team	Titles	Runners-up	Winning years
Auckland City	8	5	2004–05, 2005–06, 2006–07, 2008–09, 2013–14, 2014–15, 2017–18, 2019–20
Waitakere United	5	3	2007–08, 2009–10, 2010–11, 2011–12, 2012–13
Team Wellington	3	6	2015–16, 2016–17, 2020–21
Eastern Suburbs	1	–	2018–19
Canterbury United	–	2	
Hawke's Bay United	–	1	

== Awards ==
=== Golden Boot ===
The Golden Boot is presented to the player who scores the most goals during the season.

Year	Player	Club	Goals
2007–08	(New Zealand) Graham Little	Team Wellington	12
2008–09	(Costa Rica) Luis Corrales	Team Wellington	12
2009–10	(Vanuatu) Seule Soromon	YoungHeart Manawatu	9
2010–11	(New Zealand) Allan Pearce	Waitakere United	13
2011–12	(Papua New Guinea) George Slefendorfas	Canterbury United	12
2012–13	(Fiji) Roy Krishna	Waitakere United	12
2013–14	(Argentina) Emiliano Tade	Auckland City	12
2014–15	(United States) Tyler Boyd (England) Tom Jackson (New Zealand) Sean Lovemore	Wellington Phoenix; Southern United; Hawke's Bay United	10
2015–16	(New Zealand) Ryan De Vries	Auckland City	15
2016–17	(England) Tom Jackson	Team Wellington	16
2017–18	(Argentina) Emiliano Tade	Auckland City	16
2018–19	(New Zealand) Callum McCowatt	Eastern Suburbs	21
2019–20	(New Zealand) Myer Bevan	Auckland City	15
2020–21	(Ghana) Derek Tieku (New Zealand) Hamish Watson^{†}	Hamilton Wanderers; Team Wellington	12

^{†} Due to reaching 12 goals in less games, Hamish Watson was awarded the trophy at the Grand finals.

=== Steve Sumner Trophy ===
The Steve Sumner Trophy is presented to the man of the match in the final.

Year	Player	Club
2017–18	Callum McCowatt	Auckland City
2018–19	Callum McCowatt	Eastern Suburbs
2019–20	Not awarded^{†}	
2020–21	Andy Bevin	Team Wellington

^{†} Due to the COVID-19 pandemic, the 2019–20 season was concluded after 16 rounds and the final series wasn't played.

=== Team of the Decade ===
In 2014, to celebrate the first 10 years of the league under the franchise format (2004–05 to 2013–14), New Zealand Football announced an official Team of the Decade and five individual player awards.

Prior to the ASB Premiership Grand Final in 2014, the Team of the Decade was announced, as selected by a panel of media experts. The team was selected in a 4–3–3 formation.

Position	Player	Club(s)
Goalkeeper	(England) Danny Robinson	Waikato, Waitakere United
Defenders	(New Zealand) James Pritchett	Auckland City
Defenders	(New Zealand) Ivan Vicelich	Auckland City
Defenders	(New Zealand) Danny Hay	Waitakere United
Defenders	(New Zealand) Ian Hogg	Hawke's Bay United, Waitakere United, Auckland City
Midfielders	(Wales) Chris Bale	Waitakere United, Team Wellington, Auckland City
Midfielders	(New Zealand) Aaron Clapham	Canterbury United
Midfielders	(Spain) Albert Riera	Auckland City
Strikers	(South Africa) Keryn Jordan	Waitakere United, Auckland City
Strikers	(Fiji) Roy Krishna	Waitakere United, Auckland City
Strikers	(Solomon Islands) Benjamin Totori	YoungHeart Manawatu, Waitakere United
Substitutes	(New Zealand) Ross Nicholson (RGK)	Auckland City, YoungHeart Manawatu
Substitutes	(New Zealand) Ben Sigmund	Canterbury United, Auckland City
Substitutes	(New Zealand) Jake Butler	Waitakere United
Substitutes	(New Zealand) Allan Pearce	Waitakere United
Substitutes	(South Africa) Grant Young	Hawke's Bay United, Waitakere United, Auckland City
Coach	(England) Alan Jones	Auckland City

=== Players of the Decade ===
Throughout the 2013–14 national league season, four Player of the Decade awards (based on playing position) were announced and prior to the 2014 Grand Final an overall Player of the Decade was announced. These awards were decided by a panel of media experts with input from fans via a public vote.

Award	Player	Club(s)
Player of the Decade	(South Africa) Keryn Jordan	Waitakere United, Auckland City
Goalkeeper of the Decade	(England) Danny Robinson	Waikato, Waitakere United
Defender of the Decade	(New Zealand) Ivan Vicelich	Auckland City
Midfielder of the Decade	(New Zealand) Aaron Clapham	Canterbury United
Striker of the Decade	(Fiji) Roy Krishna	Waitakere United, Auckland City

== Records and statistics ==
Regular season matches

Updated to end of 2020–21 season

Club	SP	Pld	W	D	L	GF	GA	GD	Pts	1st	2nd	3rd	4th
Auckland City	17	282	200	47	35	699	278	+421	647	12	4	1	-
Canterbury United	17	282	115	53	114	461	444	+17	398	-	1	4	5
Eastern Suburbs	5	84	43	14	27	176	114	+62	143	-	1	-	3
Hamilton Wanderers	5	84	21	13	50	128	204	−76	76	-	-	1	-
Hawke's Bay United¹	17	282	101	51	130	477	582	−105	354	-	1	2	3
Southern United²	16	268	59	49	160	308	593	−285	226	-	-	-	-
Tasman United	4	70	19	17	34	112	143	−31	74	-	-	-	-
Team Wellington	17	282	145	54	83	613	445	+168	489	-	6	4	4
WaiBOP United³	12	198	61	28	109	272	410	−138	211	-	-	1	-
Waitakere United	17	282	151	42	89	602	413	+189	495	5	2	3	2
Wanderers SC	2	30	6	4	20	43	68	−25	22	-	-	-	-
Wellington Phoenix Reserves	7	114	28	20	66	183	289	−106	104	-	-	-	-
YoungHeart Manawatu	9	154	51	25	78	253	344	−91	178	-	2	1	-

¹ Includes record as Napier City Rovers
² Includes record as Otago United
³ Includes record as Waikato FC

Finals matches

As of the conclusion of the 2020–21 season

Club	SP	Pld	W	D	L	GF	GA	GD	1st	2nd
Auckland City	16	34	22	1	11	78	52	+26	8	5
Team Wellington	13	29	15	2	12	55	58	−3	3	6
Waitakere United	11	24	13	1	10	64	52	+12	5	3
Canterbury United	8	16	4	2	10	19	32	−13	-	2
Hawke's Bay United¹	5	9	1	0	8	13	24	−11	-	1
Eastern Suburbs	3	4	2	0	2	5	6	−1	1	-
YoungHeart Manawatu	3	5	1	1	3	6	10	−4	-	-
Southern United²	1	1	0	1	0	2	2	0	-	-
Hamilton Wanderers	1	1	0	0	1	1	4	−3	-	-
WaiBOP United³	1	1	0	0	1	1	4	−3	-	-

¹ Includes record as Napier City Rovers
² Includes record as Otago United
³ Includes record as Waikato FC

Largest victories

Season	Home team	Result	Away team	Date
2013–14	Southern United	0 – 10	Auckland City	16 February 2013
2006–07	Waitakere United	8 – 0	Southern United	8 March 2007
2007–08	YoungHeart Manawatu	0 – 8	Team Wellington	6 January 2008
2007–08	Canterbury United	1 – 9	Waitakere United	20 January 2008
2011–12	Canterbury United	9 – 1	YoungHeart Manawatu	22 January 2012
2012–13	Waikato	1 – 9	Waitakere United	20 January 2013
2005–06	YoungHeart Manawatu	8 – 1	Hawke's Bay United	18 February 2006
2006–07	Team Wellington	7 – 0	Hawke's Bay United	26 January 2007
2011–12	Canterbury United	7 – 0	Hawke's Bay United	4 February 2012

Highest scoring matches

Season	Home team	Result	Away team	Date
2005–06	Team Wellington	4 – 6	Auckland City	7 January 2006
2007–08	Canterbury United	1 – 9	Waitakere United	20 January 2008
2011–12	Canterbury United	9 – 1	YoungHeart Manawatu	22 January 2012
2012–13	Waikato	1 – 9	Waitakere United	20 January 2013
2012–13	Waitakere United	6 – 4	Hawke's Bay United	9 March 2013
2013–14	Southern United	0 – 10	Auckland City	16 February 2013
2005–06	YoungHeart Manawatu	8 – 1	Hawke's Bay United	18 February 2006
2007–08	Waikato	4 – 5	YoungHeart Manawatu	30 March 2008
2011–12	YoungHeart Manawatu	2 – 7	Waitakere United	15 January 2012

== Related competitions ==
=== OFC Champions League ===
The OFC Champions League, also known as the O-League, is the premier football competition in Oceania. It is organized by the OFC, Oceania's football governing body. It has been organized since 2007 under the current format, following its successor, the Oceania Club Championship. Two teams from the ISPS Handa Premiership participate annually. Four O-League titles have been won by teams from New Zealand.

=== ASB Charity Cup ===
The ASB Charity Cup was introduced in 2011 as a season opener played the weekend before the first matches of the ASB Premiership season. The fixture pits the ASB Premiership Grand Final winner against the best performing New Zealand team in the OFC Champions League. However, when the same team fills both categories as Auckland City did in 2014 and 2015 the ASB Premiership runner-up qualifies for Charity Cup.

Year	Winner	Score	Runner-up
2011	Auckland City	3–2	Waitakere United
2012	Waitakere United	2–1	Auckland City
2013	Auckland City	4–1	Waitakere United
2014	Team Wellington	2–2 (4–3 PSO)	Auckland City
2015	Auckland City	3–0	Team Wellington
2016	Auckland City	3–1	Team Wellington
2017	Team Wellington	3–1	Auckland City FC
2018	Auckland City	4–3	Team Wellington

ASB Phoenix Challenge

The 2010–11 season saw the introduction of the ASB Challenge Series. This was an individual friendly competition in which the eight Premiership teams competed against a reserve team attached to Wellington Phoenix, a New Zealand-based team playing in the Australian A-League. The ASB Phoenix Challenge was discontinued after the 2010–11 season but reinstated for 2012–2013, its last appearance.

White Ribbon Cup

The White Ribbon Cup, is a knockout cup competition run by New Zealand Football. The 2011–12 season will be the inaugural season of the NZF Cup.

It was established in 2011 to provide regular football for the six clubs not participating in the Oceania Champions League and runs in conjunction with the ISPS Handa Premiership regular season.

Season	Winner	Score	Runner-up
2011–12	Team Wellington	6–1	Waikato FC

=== National Youth League ===
New Zealand Football additionally ran the National Youth League, a competition for the youth teams for each of the clubs in the New Zealand Football Championship. It was held between October and December, and consisted of each team playing each other once; the fixture list mirroring that of the senior league. The team with the most points at the end of the season became the champions. The final champions were the youth team of Auckland City. After a review by New Zealand Football of all their national competitions, it was decided to end the national youth competition with its last season being 2019. In the last season of the competition, Auckland City won its seventh title as well as winning three in a row from 2017 to 2019 to finish as champions of the competition.

== See also ==
- Football in New Zealand
- New Zealand National Soccer League
- National Women's League
- Chatham Cup
- Kate Sheppard Cup
- Auckland Derby
