= WaiBOP United =

New Zealand football club

Waikato FC/WaiBOP United
- Full name: Waikato FC/WaiBOP United
- Nickname: WaiBOP
- Founded: 2004
- Dissolved: 2016
- Ground: John Kerkhof Park, Cambridge, New Zealand
- Capacity: 3,000
- League: ASB Premiership
- 2015–16: 5th
- Website: www.waikatofc.co.nz
Home colours	Away colours

WaiBOP United (known as Waikato FC until 2013) was a football club based in Hamilton, New Zealand. The club was founded in 2004 and disbanded in 2016 and played in the ASB Premiership. WaiBOP United played their home fixtures at John Kerkhof Park in Cambridge. The club's social media accounts are now inactive.

The club was the regional representative for Waikato-Bay of Plenty Football, and also played home fixtures in Rotorua and Mount Maunganui, both in the Bay of Plenty region. Between 2008 and 2010, Waikato FC was based at Centennial Park in Ngāruawāhia, and before that, played at Waikato Stadium.

From the 2014–15 season, the club changed its colours and kit to predominantly red and blue to better represent both Waikato and Bay of Plenty.

== History ==
Chart of yearly ladder positions for WaiBOP United in NZ 1st division soccer

Waikato's first season in existence was moderately successful. Playing in the inaugural season of the New Zealand Football Championship, they managed to finish in third place, after a poor start to the campaign.

Waikato's first ever competitive game was away at YoungHeart Manawatu, which they won convincingly 4–0 sending them straight to the top of table. Unfortunately, they only won one of their next nine games, a run which saw them slide down to seventh in the eight-team league. In a dramatic change of fortunes, Waikato went on to win their next five games, including an away win over eventual champions Auckland City. They only lost two more games during the season and defied pre-season predictions by claiming third place and a spot in the playoffs' "Elimination Final" against Waitakere United. Waikato were crushed 4–1 by Waitakare at Trusts Stadium, Auckland, ending their hopes of Championship victory but claiming overall third place was deemed a good achievement for a team that many expected to finish last.

Craig Flowerday won Waikato's Player' Player of the Year award, and goalkeeper Mark Fulcher won Supporters' Player of the Year. David Samson won the Young Player of the Year Award. Striker Colin Gardyne won Sky Sports' Goal of the Season award, and was also Waikato FC's joint-top goalscorer along with Brett Derry.

Despite finishing second bottom of the table, the team showed signs of promise, losing several fixtures by a single goal. Indeed, injuries to key personnel did little to dent the squad's resolve. The move to playing games outside Hamilton, perhaps was not financially successful, as the gate numbers were not as large as expected, but Rotorua became a fortress with wins over both Hawke's Bay Utd and eventual champions Auckland City.

For the start of Season 5, the Waikato FC made some bold intentions by signing up Kevin Fallon to manage the club. From the outside everything at the club seemed fine, but internally the club was in financial strife. Just out from the start of the season, the club came out and said that it could no longer afford to compete in the NZFC. This created a huge outcry amongst the football fraternity. To make the situation worse for the NZFC, Team Wellington also publicly announced that it too could no longer afford to take part in the competition.

With the prospect of no Waikato/Bay Of Plenty representation at the national level, plus the fear that the NZFC would collapse, various people in the football community stepped in to help, some of the most notable being Gordon Glen-Watson, who had played top-level football in New Zealand, and Wayne Bates, a Ngaruawahia United AFC alumni. Anyone costing the club significant sums of money was let go, leaving the club with no players or coaching staff. To help keep the club alive, Ngaruawahia United offered Waikato FC their facilities at Centennial Park for training and playing.

Dave Edmondson, Ngaruawahia United's coach, put his name forward to help the team at no cost and Graham Pearce, formally of Waitakere United, came on board and very quickly Waikato FC put together a piecemeal team to compete in the NZFC.

The NZFC itself went through a major restructure during this same period to keep Waikato FC and Team Wellington in competition. To keep the costs down, the third round of the competition was culled. This was good news for some clubs but not others, especially teams based in the Auckland region. As compensation, an extended finals was introduced with each team playing home and away.

While Waikato FC did not make the top four and qualify for the playoffs, it remained in touch with the leaders throughout the season and had it been lucky enough to pick up a further four points, would have qualified for the finals.

In December 2015 it was announced that they'd be passing their ASB Premiership licence on to Hamilton Wanderers effective 2016–17 season ending their existence in the top flight of New Zealand Football.

They played their last match away to Auckland City FC on 28 February 2016, going down 4–1 to bring their existence to an end.

== NZFC League Positions & Finals Results ==
A list of Waikato FC's League Placings as well as the NZFC League Champions:

Year	Games	Won	Drawn	Lost	GF	GA	Points	Place	Champion
2004–05	21	9	4	8	27	25	31	3rd	Auckland City FC
2005–06	21	6	4	11	31	44	22	7th	Auckland City FC
2006–07	21	3	5	13	19	45	14	7th	Auckland City FC
2007–08	21	5	5	11	24	34	20	5th	Waitakere United
2008–09	14	6	1	7	19	22	19	6th	Auckland City FC
2009–10	14	3	1	10	19	33	10	8th	Waitakere United
2010–11	14	4	3	7	21	33	15	6th	Waitakere United

- 2004–05: Waikato FC played Waitakere United away in the Preliminary Final losing 4–1. Auckland City FC won the Grand Final 3–2.
- 2005–06: Top five sides in the League appeared in Playoffs. Auckland City FC won the Grand Final 4–3 on penalties against Canterbury United after extra time finished 3–3.
- 2006–07: Return to Preliminarily and Grand Final only format. Playing the Grand Final at home, Waitakere United lost 2–3 to Auckland City FC.
- 2007–08: Same format as 2006–2007 with Waitakere United winning 2–0 against Team Wellington at home.
- 2008–09: Season reduced to Round Robin format due to various clubs, especially Waikato FC suffering from severe financial difficulties. To compensate for this, a Round Robin top four playoff was introduced with Waitakere United losing 1–2 to Auckland City FC at home in the Grand Final.

== Managers ==
- (New Zealand) Declan Edge (1 July 2004 – 30 June 2006)
- (New Zealand) Roger Wilkinson (1 July 2006 – 30 June 2008)
- (New Zealand) Dave Edmondson (1 July 2008 – 30 June 2009)
- (New Zealand) Che Bunce (1 July 2009 – 30 June 2010)
- (Germany) Willy Gerdsen (10 Aug 2010 – 30 June 2011)
- (New Zealand) Dave Edmondson (1 July 2011 – 22 Aug 2011)
- (New Zealand) Declan Edge (23 Aug 2011 – 27 Nov 2012)
- (New Zealand) Mark Cossey (27 Nov 2012 – 30 June 2013)
- (New Zealand) Peter Smith (1 July 2013–present)
