= Grant Young (soccer) =

South African soccer player

Personal information
- Full name: Grant Young
- Date of birth: 3 March 1971 (age 55)
- Place of birth: Cape Town, South Africa
- Height: 1.78 m (5 ft 10 in)
- Position: Striker

Team information
- Current team: Hibiscus Coast

Senior career*
Years	Team	Apps	(Gls)
- Hellenic FC
- Ghent
- East Coast Bays
- Central United
- Auckland City FC
- Forrest Hill Milford

International career
1994	South Africa	1	(0)
- * Club domestic league appearances and goals

Grant Young (born 3 March 1971 in Cape Town) is a football (soccer) player who represented South Africa at international level and participated in two FIFA Club World Cups. Father of the great Shaydon Young, former Waibop striker.

== Career ==
Born in South Africa, Young spent much of his career with local club Hellenic before a stint with Ghent in Belgium. He emigrated to New Zealand in 2004 where he played first for East Coast Bays, before joining Central United and subsequently Auckland City FC.

He represented Auckland City in their first FIFA Club World Cup appearance in 2006, in which they failed to impress, losing every game, and failing to score a single goal, and again in the 2009 competition in United Arab Emirates where they fared better, beating TP Mazembe 3-2 before going out to Atlante Fútbol Club in the quarter-finals.

== International career ==
Young made a solitary appearance for South Africa as a substitute in a friendly against Australia on 12 June 1994. Australia won the match 1-0.
