= Waitakere United =

- Full name: Waitakere United Football Club
- Founded: 2004; 22 years ago
- Dissolved: 2021; 5 years ago
- Ground: Douglas Field at The Trusts Arena
- Capacity: 3,000
- Chairman: Peter Bult
- Manager: Paul Hobson
- League: ISPS Handa Premiership
- 2019-20: 3rd
Home colours	Away colours

Waitakere United was a football club based in Waitakere City, New Zealand. They were one of the franchises in the ISPS Handa Premiership. They played their home games at Fred Taylor Park in Kumeū and The Trusts Arena.

== History ==
Chart of yearly ladder positions for Waitakere United in NZ 1st division soccer

Waitakere United was formed as a special franchise club in 2004 to play in the New Zealand Football Championship (NZFC), New Zealand's top domestic football competition. The team represented 12 member clubs from Mt Albert to the Kaipara.

In the inaugural season (2004–05) of the NZFC, Waitakere United finished runners-up to the champions Auckland City but they followed up with a very disappointing 6th place in the next season. In the following season, however, Waitakere finished as NZFC premiers but lost in the grand final once again to Auckland City FC 3–2.

Due to the withdrawal of Vanuatu's Port Vila Sharks, Waitakere was given a berth in the inaugural OFC Champions League, for 2007, as NZFC premiers. They finished atop their group, edging out Auckland City and New Caledonia's AS Mont-Dore. They went on to defeat Ba FC of Fiji in the final, becoming the first OFC-League champions. Commins Menapi scored a crucial away goal that proved the difference as the tie finished 2–2 in aggregate. Taking this championship qualified United to compete in the 2007 FIFA Club World Cup in Japan, where they lost in the 'play-in' match to Sepahan 1–3.

Waitakere United defended their championship in capturing the 2007–08 OFC Champions League, defeating Kossa in the final 6–3 in goal aggregate. During this season, Douglas Field was under extensive renovation forcing Waitakere United to play most of their home fixtures at Fred Taylor Park in Whenuapai.

Waitakere had a notable rivalry with neighbours Auckland City. With the change of structure of football in New Zealand at the start of 2021, and the creation of the new New Zealand National League, this saw the end of Waitakere United, and consequently the end of the Auckland Derby.

== Honours ==
=== National ===
- New Zealand Football Championship
  - Champions (5): 2007–08, 2009–10, 2010–11, 2011–12, 2012–13
  - Premiers (5): 2006–07, 2007–08, 2008–09, 2010–11, 2012–13
- ASB Charity Cup
  - Champions (1): 2012

=== International ===
- OFC Champions League
  - Champions (2): 2007, 2007–08

=== Youth team ===
- ASB National Youth League
  - Champions (2): 2008, 2011

== Performance in OFC competitions ==
- OFC Champions League: 7 appearances

Best: Champions in 2007 and 2007–08
2007: Champions
2007–08: Champions
2008–09: 2° in Group A
2009–10: Finalist
2010–11: 2° in Group B
2011–12: 2° in Group A
2012–13: Finalist

Season	Competition	Round	Club	Home	Away	Aggregate
2007	OFC Champions League	Group A	(New Zealand) Auckland City	2–2	2–2	1st
2007	OFC Champions League	Group A	(New Caledonia) Mont-Dore	6–1	3–0	1st
2007	OFC Champions League	Final	(Fiji) 4R Electrical Ba	1–0	1–2	2–2 (a)
2007–08	OFC Champions League	Group A	(New Zealand) Auckland City	1–1	1–0	1st
2007–08	OFC Champions League	Group A	(French Polynesia) Mana-Ura	2–1	1–1	1st
2007–08	OFC Champions League	Final	(Solomon Islands) Kossa	5–0	1–3	6–3
2008–09	OFC Champions League	Group A	(New Zealand) Auckland City	1–3	2–2	2nd
2008–09	OFC Champions League	Group A	(Vanuatu) Port Vila Sharks	3–0	3–2	2nd
2009–10	OFC Champions League	Group A	(New Zealand) Auckland City	1–1	2–2	1st
2009–10	OFC Champions League	Group A	(New Caledonia) Magenta	4–1	1–1	1st
2009–10	OFC Champions League	Group A	(French Polynesia) Manu-Ura	2–0	5–1	1st
2009–10	OFC Champions League	Final	(Papua New Guinea) Hekari United	2–1	0–3	2–4
2010–11	OFC Champions League	Group B	(New Zealand) Auckland City	1–1	0–1	2nd
2010–11	OFC Champions League	Group B	(New Caledonia) Magenta	2–1	1–1	2nd
2010–11	OFC Champions League	Group B	(French Polynesia) Tefana	3–1	1–3	2nd
2011–12	OFC Champions League	Group A	(French Polynesia) Tefana	10–0	0–3	2nd
2011–12	OFC Champions League	Group A	(Fiji) Ba	4–0	2–3	2nd
2011–12	OFC Champions League	Group A	(New Caledonia) Mont-Dore	4–0	1–0	2nd
2012–13	OFC Champions League	Group B	(New Zealand) Auckland City	1–3	1–0	1st
2012–13	OFC Champions League	Group B	(French Polynesia) Dragon	0–0	1–0	1st
2012–13	OFC Champions League	Group B	(New Caledonia) Mont-Dore	3–1	3–2	1st
2012–13	OFC Champions League	Semi-finals	(Vanuatu) Amicale	2–1	2–0	4–1
2012–13	OFC Champions League	Final	(New Zealand) Auckland City	1–2		
2013–14	OFC Champions League	Group A	(French Polynesia) Pirae	1–3		3rd
2013–14	OFC Champions League	Group A	(Solomon Islands) Solomon Warriors	1–1		3rd
2013–14	OFC Champions League	Group A	(Samoa) Kiwi	2–0		3rd

== FIFA Club World Cup History ==
FIFA Club World Cup History
Year	Round	Score	Result	Scorers
2007	Play-off	(New Zealand) Waitakere United 1 – 3 Sepahan (Iran)	Loss	Aghily 74' (o.g.)
2008	Play-off	(New Zealand) Waitakere United 1 – 2 Adelaide United (Australia)	Loss	Seaman 34'

== Managers ==
- (New Zealand) Chris Milicich (2004–05)
- (England) Steve Cain (1 July 2006 – 30 June 2007)
- (New Zealand) Chris Milicich (1 July 2007 – 30 June 2009)
- (England) Neil Emblen (1 July 2009 – 30 June 2012)
- (New Zealand) Paul Marshall (1 July 2012 – 30 June 2013)
- (New Zealand) Paul Temple & (Republic of Ireland) Brian Shelley(1 July 2013–15)
- (New Zealand) Chris Milicich (2015 – 2019)
- (New Zealand) Paul Hobson (30 November 2019 – 2021)
