= 2013 OFC Champions League final =

- Event: 2012–13 OFC Champions League
Waitakere United	Auckland City
(New Zealand)	(New Zealand)
1	2
- Date: 19 May 2013
- Venue: Mount Smart Stadium (Arena 2), Auckland
- Referee: Peter O'Leary (New Zealand)
- Attendance: 3,000

The 2013 OFC Champions League final was the final of the 2012–13 OFC Champions League, the 12th edition of the Oceania Cup, Oceania's premier club football tournament organized by the Oceania Football Confederation (OFC), and the 7th season under the current OFC Champions League name.

The final was contested between two New Zealand teams, Waitakere United and Auckland City, at Arena 2 of Mount Smart Stadium in Auckland, New Zealand, on 19 May 2013. The winner earned the right to represent the OFC at the 2013 FIFA Club World Cup, entering at the qualifying play-off round.

Auckland City won the final 2–1 to record their third consecutive and fifth overall Champions League title.

== Background ==
This is the first ever OFC club final which involves two teams from the same country. Either Auckland City or Waitakere United have appeared in the previous seven OFC club finals. Auckland City are the two-time defending champions and have played in four previous finals, winning all of them (2006, 2009, 2011, and 2012), while Waitakere United have played in three previous finals, winning two (2007 and 2008) and losing one (2010).

== Road to final ==
Note: In all results below, the score of the finalist is given first.

(New Zealand) Waitakere United				Round	(New Zealand) Auckland City			
Opponent	Result			Group stage	Opponent	Result		
(French Polynesia) Dragon	0–0 (H)			Matchday 1	(New Caledonia) Mont-Dore	2–0 (A)		
(New Zealand) Auckland City	1–3 (H)			Matchday 2	(New Zealand) Waitakere United	3–1 (A)		
(French Polynesia) Dragon	1–0 (A)			Matchday 3	(New Caledonia) Mont-Dore	12–2 (H)		
(New Caledonia) Mont-Dore	3–1 (H)			Matchday 4	(French Polynesia) Dragon	1–3 (H)		
(New Zealand) Auckland City	1–0 (A)			Matchday 5	(New Zealand) Waitakere United	0–1 (H)		
(New Caledonia) Mont-Dore	3–2 (A)			Matchday 6	(French Polynesia) Dragon	1–1 (A)		
Group B winner: Team / Pld / W / D / L / GF / GA / GD / Pts; (New Zealand) Waitakere United / 6 / 4 / 1 / 1 / 9 / 6 / +3 / 13; (New Zealand) Auckland City / 6 / 3 / 1 / 2 / 19 / 8 / +11 / 10; (French Polynesia) Dragon / 6 / 2 / 3 / 1 / 9 / 5 / +4 / 9; (New Caledonia) Mont-Dore / 6 / 0 / 1 / 5 / 7 / 25 / −18 / 1; Source:				Final standings	Group B runner-up: Team / Pld / W / D / L / GF / GA / GD / Pts; (New Zealand) Waitakere United / 6 / 4 / 1 / 1 / 9 / 6 / +3 / 13; (New Zealand) Auckland City / 6 / 3 / 1 / 2 / 19 / 8 / +11 / 10; (French Polynesia) Dragon / 6 / 2 / 3 / 1 / 9 / 5 / +4 / 9; (New Caledonia) Mont-Dore / 6 / 0 / 1 / 5 / 7 / 25 / −18 / 1; Source:			
Opponent	Agg.	1st leg	2nd leg	Semi-finals	Opponent	Agg.	1st leg	2nd leg
(Vanuatu) Amicale	4–1	2–0 (A)	2–1 (H)	Semi-finals	(Fiji) Ba	7–1	6–1 (H)	1–0 (A)

== Rules ==
The final was played as a single match at a pre-determined venue (a change from previous OFC Champions League finals which had been played on a home-and-away two-legged basis). If tied after regulation, extra time and, if necessary, penalty shoot-out were used to decide the winner.

== Match ==
19 May 2013
15:45 UTC+12

Waitakere United (New Zealand)	1–2	(New Zealand) Auckland City
Coombes 39'	Report	Dickinson 16'; Feneridis 19'

Mount Smart Stadium (Arena 2), Auckland
Attendance: 3,000
Referee: Peter O'Leary (New Zealand)

Waitakere United	Auckland City

GK	1	(England) Danny Robinson
DF	2	(New Zealand) Aaron Scott
DF	4	(New Zealand) Tim Myers	(yellow card) 31' (yellow-red card) 59'
DF	5	(Republic of Ireland) Brian Shelley
DF	6	(Netherlands) Matt Cunneen
MF	8	(New Zealand) Chad Coombes
MF	18	(New Zealand) Sam Mathews		(substituted off) 76'
MF	20	(South Africa) Ryan De Vries
FW	10	(New Zealand) Allan Pearce		(substituted off) 53'
FW	12	(Fiji) Roy Krishna
FW	17	(New Zealand) Jake Butler (c)
Substitutes:
GK	28	(New Zealand) Alex Carr
DF	3	(New Zealand) Jack Beguely
MF	7	(New Zealand) Jeremy Christie
MF	19	(New Zealand) Daniel Morgan		(substituted on) 76'
MF	23	(Japan) Masaki Nomoto
MF	27	(England) Chris Palmer		(substituted on) 53'
FW	30	(New Zealand) Rory Turner
Manager:
(New Zealand) Paul Marshall

GK	12	(New Zealand) Tamati Williams
DF	3	(Japan) Takuya Iwata
DF	7	(New Zealand) James Pritchett
DF	15	(New Zealand) Ivan Vicelich (c)
DF	19	(Croatia) Mario Bilen
MF	8	(Wales) Chris Bale		(substituted off) 90+4'
MF	11	(New Zealand) Daniel Koprivcic		(substituted off) 55'
MF	13	(New Zealand) Alex Feneridis	(yellow card) 43'	(substituted off) 88'
FW	16	(Spain) Albert Riera	(yellow card) 45+2'
FW	9	(Spain) Manel Expósito	(yellow card) 64'
FW	14	(England) Adam Dickinson	(yellow card) 90+4'
Substitutes:
GK	1	(New Zealand) Jacob Spoonley
DF	22	(New Zealand) Andrew Milne		(substituted on) 90+4'
MF	4	(New Zealand) Adam McGeorge		(substituted on) 88'
MF	5	(England) Darren White		(substituted on) 55'
MF	17	(Spain) Pedro García
FW	20	(Argentina) Emiliano Tade
FW	21	(Papua New Guinea) David Browne
Manager:
(Spain) Ramon Tribulietx

Assistant referees:
Jan-Hendrik Hintz (New Zealand)
Ravinesh Kumar (Fiji)
Fourth official:
Norbert Hauata (Tahiti)
