= 2012–13 OFC Champions League =

Tournament details
- Dates: 1–8 May 2012 (preliminary stage); 30 March – 19 May 2013 (final stage)
- Teams: 8 (final stage); 12 (total) (from 11 associations)

Final positions
- Champions: (New Zealand) Auckland City (5th title)
- Runners-up: (New Zealand) Waitakere United

Tournament statistics
- Matches played: 36
- Goals scored: 132 (3.67 per match)
- Top scorer(s): (Nigeria) Sanni Issa (9 goals)
- Best player: (Nigeria) Sanni Issa
- Best goalkeeper: (England) Danny Robinson

The 2012–13 OFC Champions League was the 12th edition of the Oceanian Club Championship, Oceania's premier club football tournament organized by the Oceania Football Confederation (OFC), and the 7th season under the current OFC Champions League name.

Auckland City became the first team to win three consecutive title after defeating Waitakere United in an all-New Zealand final. As the winner of the 2013 OFC Champions League, they earned the right to represent the OFC at the 2013 FIFA Club World Cup.

== Format change ==
Location of teams of the 2012–13 OFC Champions League.
Teams entering the group stage
Team entering the play-off round
Teams entering the preliminary round

The OFC decided on the following format changes for the 2013 edition:

- A preliminary stage was added to the tournament such that teams from all eleven OFC member associations have a chance to contest the title of O-League Champion.
- Instead of kicking off in late October or early November, the group stage was played in a one-month period in March and April, and games took place every weekend, including mid-week matches.
- Unlike in previous years, a semi-final stage was played and featured the two highest-placed teams in each group. These matches were played over two legs on a home-and-away basis.
- The victorious semi-final teams then clashed in a winner-takes-all final at a pre-determined venue. The one-match final is a change from previous seasons, in which the final was played over two legs, home and away.

== Teams ==
The following teams entered the competition.

Association	Team	Qualifying method
Teams entering the group stage
Fiji	Ba	2011 Fiji National Football League champion
New Zealand	Waitakere United	2011–12 ASB Premiership grand final champion
New Zealand	Auckland City	2011–12 ASB Premiership regular season premier
Papua New Guinea	Hekari United	2011–12 Papua New Guinea National Soccer League champion
Solomon Islands	Solomon Warriors	2011–12 Solomon Islands S-League champion
(French Polynesia) Tahiti	Dragon	2011–12 Tahiti Division Fédérale champion
Vanuatu	Amicale	2012 Vanuatu National Soccer League champion
Team entering the play-off round
New Caledonia	Mont-Dore	2011 New Caledonia Division Honneur champion
Teams entering the preliminary round
American Samoa	Pago Youth	2011 FFAS Senior League champion
Cook Islands	Tupapa Maraerenga	2011 Cook Islands Round Cup champion
Samoa	Kiwi	2010–11 Samoa National League champion
Tonga	Lotoha'apai United	2010–11 Tonga Major League champion

== Schedule ==
The schedule of the competition was as follows.

Stage		Date (local time)
Preliminary stage	Matchday 1	1 May 2012
Preliminary stage	Matchday 2	3 May 2012
Preliminary stage	Matchday 3	5 May 2012
Preliminary stage	Play-off	8 May 2012
Group stage	Matchday 1	30 March 2013
Group stage	Matchday 2	3, 5–7 April 2013
Group stage	Matchday 3	12–13 April 2013
Group stage	Matchday 4	17 April 2013
Group stage	Matchday 5	20–21, 23 April 2013
Group stage	Matchday 6	27–28 April 2013
Semi-finals	First leg	4–5 May 2013
Semi-finals	Second leg	11–12 May 2013
Final		19 May 2013

Matches played in Tahiti are one day behind the other countries in global time as Tahiti is on the other side of the International Date Line.

== Preliminary stage ==
The preliminary stage matches were played in Tonga from 1 May to 8 May 2012.

=== Preliminary round ===
In the preliminary round, the four teams played each other on a round-robin basis. The group winner advanced to the play-off round.

Team	Pld	W	D	L	GF	GA	GD	Pts
(Cook Islands) Tupapa Maraerenga	3	2	1	0	14	4	+10	7
(Tonga) Lotoha'apai United	3	2	1	0	11	4	+7	7
(Samoa) Kiwi	3	1	0	2	7	5	+2	3
(American Samoa) Pago Youth	3	0	0	3	1	20	−19	0

1 May 2012
13:00 UTC+13

Pago Youth (American Samoa)	1–5	(Samoa) Kiwi
P. Samuelu 90'	Report	Malo 7', 23'; Saofaiga 26', 80'; Gosche 70'

Loto-Tonga Centre, ‘Atele
Attendance: 100
Referee: Rakesh Varman (Fiji)
1 May 2012
15:30 UTC+13

Lotoha'apai United (Tonga)	3–3	(Cook Islands) Tupapa Maraerenga
Maamaaloa 68'; M. Uhatahi 75'; Moala 81'	Report	Best 37'; Berlim 55', 69'

Loto-Tonga Centre, ‘Atele
Attendance: 300
Referee: Mirko Benischke (New Zealand)

3 May 2012
13:00 UTC+13

Lotoha'apai United (Tonga)	6–0	(American Samoa) Pago Youth
M. Uhatahi 23', 30'; Maamaaloa 54', 71', 89'; S. T. Faupula 83'	Report

Loto-Tonga Centre, ‘Atele
Attendance: 200
Referee: Norbert Hauata (Tahiti)
3 May 2012
15:30 UTC+13

Kiwi (Samoa)	1–2	(Cook Islands) Tupapa Maraerenga
Saofaiga 19'	Report	Harmon 29'; Best 31'

Loto-Tonga Centre, ‘Atele
Attendance: 150
Referee: John Saohu (Solomon Islands)

5 May 2012
13:00 UTC+13

Tupapa Maraerenga (Cook Islands)	9–0	(American Samoa) Pago Youth
Tiro 3'; Berlim 23', 30', 53', 71'; Fowler 45+2'; Manuel 51', 69'; Harmon 88'	Report

Loto-Tonga Centre, ‘Atele
Attendance: 100
Referee: Rakesh Varman (Fiji)
5 May 2012
15:30 UTC+13

Kiwi (Samoa)	1–2	(Tonga) Lotoha'apai United
Saofaiga 84'	Report	M. Uhatahi 45+5'; Uele 57' (pen.)

Loto-Tonga Centre, ‘Atele
Attendance: 350
Referee: Mirko Benischke (New Zealand)

=== Play-off round ===
In the play-off round, the winner of the preliminary round and the team entering in this round played each other over one match. The winner advanced to the group stage to join the seven automatic qualifiers.

8 May 2012
15:00 UTC+13

Tupapa Maraerenga (Cook Islands)	1–3	(New Caledonia) Mont-Dore
Harmon 90+2'	Report	Kenon 33'; Bessières 45'; Wamytan 85' (pen.)

Loto-Tonga Centre, ‘Atele
Attendance: 400
Referee: Norbert Hauata (Tahiti)

== Group stage ==
In the group stage, the eight teams were divided into two groups of four. In each group, the four teams played each other on a home-and-away round-robin basis. The group winners and runners-up advanced to the semi-finals.

On 5 February 2013, the OFC announced the draw and schedule of the group stage. The group stage matches were played from 30 March to 28 April 2013.

=== Group A ===
Team	Pld	W	D	L	GF	GA	GD	Pts	BA	AMI	SOL	HEK
(Fiji) Ba	6	5	1	0	16	4	+12	16		2–0	5–0	2–0
(Vanuatu) Amicale	6	3	1	2	7	4	+3	10	1–2		2–0	2–0
(Solomon Islands) Solomon Warriors	6	1	1	4	7	15	−8	4	2–2	0–2		4–2
(Papua New Guinea) Hekari United	6	1	1	4	5	12	−7	4	1–3	0–0	2–1	

30 March 2013
15:00 UTC+11

Solomon Warriors (Solomon Islands)	0–2	(Vanuatu) Amicale
	Report	Masauvakalo 64'; Gueye 76' (pen.)

Lawson Tama Stadium, Honiara
Attendance: 12,000
Referee: Nick Waldron (New Zealand)
30 March 2013
15:00 UTC+10

Hekari United (Papua New Guinea)	1–3	(Fiji) Ba
Jack 50'	Report	Tiwa 44'; Issa 52'; Manuca 90+2'

PMRL Stadium, Port Moresby
Referee: Peter O'Leary (New Zealand)

3 April 2013
15:00 UTC+11

Solomon Warriors (Solomon Islands)	2–2	(Fiji) Ba
Billy 32'; Lea'alafa 90+2'	Report	Issa 6', 20'

Lawson Tama Stadium, Honiara
Attendance: 10,000
Referee: Hillary Ani (Papua New Guinea)
6 April 2013
15:00 UTC+10

Hekari United (Papua New Guinea)	0–0	(Vanuatu) Amicale
	Report

PMRL Stadium, Port Moresby
Referee: Rakesh Varman (Fiji)

13 April 2013
15:00 UTC+12

Ba (Fiji)	2–0	(Papua New Guinea) Hekari United
Tiwa 18'; Issa 80'	Report

Govind Park, Ba
Referee: Averii Jacques (Tahiti)
13 April 2013
15:00 UTC+11

Amicale (Vanuatu)	2–0	(Solomon Islands) Solomon Warriors
Bongnaim 60'; Fred 88'	Report

Port Vila Municipal Stadium, Port Vila
Referee: Peter O'Leary (New Zealand)

17 April 2013
15:00 UTC+12

Ba (Fiji)	5–0	(Solomon Islands) Solomon Warriors
Tiwa 2'; Issa 47', 63', 75'; Naioko 86'	Report

Govind Park, Ba
Attendance: 6,000
Referee: Hillary Ani (Papua New Guinea)
17 April 2013
15:00 UTC+11

Amicale (Vanuatu)	2–0	(Papua New Guinea) Hekari United
Nawo 38'; Masauvakalo 76'	Report

Port Vila Municipal Stadium, Port Vila
Attendance: 6,000
Referee: John Saohu (Solomon Islands)

20 April 2013
15:00 UTC+11

Solomon Warriors (Solomon Islands)	4–2	(Papua New Guinea) Hekari United
G. Feni 11', 44'; Kilifa 13', 27'	Report	Waroi 43'; Gunemba 89'

Lawson Tama Stadium, Honiara
Referee: Salesh Chand (Fiji)
20 April 2013
15:00 UTC+11

Amicale (Vanuatu)	1–2	(Fiji) Ba
Masauvakalo 19'	Report	Suwamy 60' (pen.); Issa 67' (pen.)

Port Vila Municipal Stadium, Port Vila
Attendance: 8,000
Referee: Mirko Benischke (New Zealand)

27 April 2013
15:00 UTC+12

Ba (Fiji)	2–0	(Vanuatu) Amicale
Issa 60' (pen.); Shaheed 83'	Report

Govind Park, Ba
Referee: Matt Conger (New Zealand)
27 April 2013
15:00 UTC+10

Hekari United (Papua New Guinea)	2–1	(Solomon Islands) Solomon Warriors
Gunemba 17'; Dabinyaba 27'	Report	Kilifa 54'

PMRL Stadium, Port Moresby
Referee: Nick Waldron (New Zealand)

=== Group B ===
Team	Pld	W	D	L	GF	GA	GD	Pts	WAI	AUC	DRA	MON
(New Zealand) Waitakere United	6	4	1	1	9	6	+3	13		1–3	0–0	3–1
(New Zealand) Auckland City	6	3	1	2	19	8	+11	10	0–1		1–3	12–2
(French Polynesia) Dragon	6	2	3	1	9	5	+4	9	0–1	1–1		1–1
(New Caledonia) Mont-Dore	6	0	1	5	7	25	−18	1	2–3	0–2	1–4	

30 March 2013
15:00 UTC+13

Waitakere United (New Zealand)	0–0	(French Polynesia) Dragon
	Report

Fred Taylor Park, Auckland
Attendance: 300
Referee: Rakesh Varman (Fiji)
30 March 2013
15:00 UTC+11

Mont-Dore (New Caledonia)	0–2	(New Zealand) Auckland City
	Report	Souto 61'; Dickinson 67' (pen.)

Stade Numa-Daly Magenta, Nouméa
Attendance: 350
Referee: Averii Jacques (Tahiti)

5 April 2013
19:00 UTC+11

Mont-Dore (New Caledonia)	1–4	(French Polynesia) Dragon
Painbéni 10'	Report	T. Tehau 40', 81'; Teikihakaupoko 86'; Chong Hue 88'

Stade Numa-Daly Magenta, Nouméa
Referee: Gerald Oiaka (Solomon Islands)
7 April 2013
15:00 UTC+12

Waitakere United (New Zealand)	1–3	(New Zealand) Auckland City
Krishna 55'	Report	Dickinson 5', 62' (pen.); Souto 51'

Fred Taylor Park, Auckland
Attendance: 1,500
Referee: Peter O'Leary (New Zealand)

13 April 2013
15:00 UTC+12

Auckland City (New Zealand)	12–2	(New Caledonia) Mont-Dore
Dickinson 4', 34', 43'; White 8'; Souto 9'; Bale 18'; Bilen 26', 38'; Riera 28'; Expósito 61', 65', 81'	Report	Bob 46'; Painbéni 78'

Kiwitea Street, Auckland
Referee: Norbert Hauata (Tahiti)
12 April 2013
19:30 UTC−10

Dragon (French Polynesia)	0–1	(New Zealand) Waitakere United
	Report	Butler 43'

Stade Pater Te Hono Nui, Pirae
Referee: Isidore Assiene-Ambassa (New Caledonia)

17 April 2013
15:00 UTC+12

Auckland City (New Zealand)	1–3	(French Polynesia) Dragon
Dickinson 45+1' (pen.)	Report	T. Tehau 76'; Vicelich 84' (o.g.); Graglia 90+1'

Trusts Stadium, Auckland
Attendance: 600
Referee: Gerald Oiaka (Solomon Islands)
17 April 2013
18:00 UTC+12

Waitakere United (New Zealand)	3–1	(New Caledonia) Mont-Dore
Palmer 2' (pen.); Krishna 49', 55'	Report	Maou 75'

Trusts Stadium, Auckland
Attendance: 800
Referee: Kader Zitouni (Tahiti)

21 April 2013
15:00 UTC+12

Auckland City (New Zealand)	0–1	(New Zealand) Waitakere United
	Report	Butler 26'

Kiwitea Street, Auckland
Attendance: 2,000
Referee: Andrew Achari (Fiji)
23 April 2013
19:30 UTC−10

Dragon (French Polynesia)	1–1	(New Caledonia) Mont-Dore
Vallar 35'	Report	Vakie 73'

Stade Pater Te Hono Nui, Pirae
Referee: Robinson Banga (Vanuatu)

27 April 2013
19:30 UTC−10

Dragon (French Polynesia)	1–1	(New Zealand) Auckland City
T. Tehau 5'	Report	Expósito 39'

Stade Pater Te Hono Nui, Pirae
Referee: Rakesh Varman (Fiji)
28 April 2013
16:30 UTC+11

Mont-Dore (New Caledonia)	2–3	(New Zealand) Waitakere United
Bessières 36'; Bob 66'	Report	Palmer 1', 53' (pen.); De Vries 78'

Stade Numa-Daly Magenta, Nouméa
Referee: Gerald Oiaka (Solomon Islands)

== Knockout stage ==
=== Semi-finals ===
In the semi-finals, the winner of Group A play the runner-up of Group B, and the winner of Group B play the runner-up of Group A. In each tie, teams play each other on a home-and-away two-legged basis, with the group winners hosting the second leg. If the aggregate score is tied after the second leg, the away goals rule is applied. If away goals are also tied, extra time is played, and the away goals rule is applied again after extra time, i.e., if there are goals scored during extra time and the aggregate score is still tied, the away team qualifies. If no goals are scored during extra time, the winner is determined by penalty shoot-out.

The first legs were played on 4 and 5 May 2013, and the second legs were played on 11 and 12 May 2013.

==== First leg ====
4 May 2013
15:00 UTC+11

Amicale (Vanuatu)	0–2	(New Zealand) Waitakere United
	Report	Krishna 33', 45+2'

Port Vila Municipal Stadium, Port Vila
Referee: Averii Jacques (Tahiti)

5 May 2013
15:00 UTC+12

Auckland City (New Zealand)	6–1	(Fiji) Ba
Expósito 31', 73'; Tade 63'; White 80', 89'; Bilen 86'	Report	Manuca 34'

Kiwitea Street, Auckland
Attendance: 3,000
Referee: Norbert Hauata (Tahiti)

==== Second leg ====
11 May 2013
14:00 UTC+12

Ba (Fiji)	0–1	(New Zealand) Auckland City
	Report	Feneridis 51'

Govind Park, Ba
Referee: Gerald Oiaka (Solomon Islands)

Auckland City won 7–1 on aggregate and advanced to the final.

12 May 2013
14:00 UTC+12

Waitakere United (New Zealand)	2–1	(Vanuatu) Amicale
Coombes 66'; Krishna 89'	Report	Nawo 37'

Fred Taylor Park, Auckland
Referee: Kader Zitouni (Tahiti)

Waitakere United won 4–1 on aggregate and advanced to the final.

=== Final ===
In the final, the two semi-final winners played each other over one match at a pre-determined venue, with extra time and penalty shoot-out used to decide the winner if necessary. The final was played at Arena 2 of Mount Smart Stadium in Auckland, New Zealand on 19 May 2013.

19 May 2013
15:45 UTC+12

Waitakere United (New Zealand)	1–2	(New Zealand) Auckland City
Coombes 39'	Report	Dickinson 16'; Feneridis 19'

Mount Smart Stadium (Arena 2), Auckland
Attendance: 3,000
Referee: Peter O'Leary (New Zealand)

== Awards ==
Award	Player	Team
Golden Ball	(Nigeria) Sanni Issa	(Fiji) Ba
Golden Boot	(Nigeria) Sanni Issa	(Fiji) Ba
Golden Gloves	(England) Danny Robinson	(New Zealand) Waitakere United
Fair Play Award	—	(Solomon Islands) Solomon Warriors

== Goalscorers ==
=== Preliminary stage ===
In the preliminary stage (preliminary round and play-off round), there were 37 goals in 7 matches, for an average of 5.29 goals per match.

Rank	Player	Team	Goals
1	(Cook Islands) Leo Berlim	(Cook Islands) Tupapa Maraerenga	6
2	(Samoa) Mike Saofaiga	(Samoa) Kiwi	4
2	(Tonga) Timote Maamaaloa	(Tonga) Lotoha'apai United	4
2	(Tonga) Mark Uhatahi	(Tonga) Lotoha'apai United	4
5	(Cook Islands) Grover Harmon	(Cook Islands) Tupapa Maraerenga	3
6	(Cook Islands) Campbell Best	(Cook Islands) Tupapa Maraerenga	2
6	(Cook Islands) Roger Manuel	(Cook Islands) Tupapa Maraerenga	2
6	(Samoa) Silao Malo	(Samoa) Kiwi	2
10	(American Samoa) Puni Samuelu	(American Samoa) Pago Youth	1
10	(Cook Islands) Hone Fowler	(Cook Islands) Tupapa Maraerenga	1
10	(Cook Islands) Twin Tiro	(Cook Islands) Tupapa Maraerenga	1
10	(New Caledonia) Loïc Bessières	(New Caledonia) Mont-Dore	1
10	(New Caledonia) Pascal Kenon	(New Caledonia) Mont-Dore	1
10	(New Caledonia) Jacques Wamytan	(New Caledonia) Mont-Dore	1
10	(Samoa) Luki Gosche	(Samoa) Kiwi	1
10	(Tonga) Soane Faupula	(Tonga) Lotoha'apai United	1
10	(Tonga) Lafaele Moala	(Tonga) Lotoha'apai United	1
10	(Tonga) Kilifi Uele	(Tonga) Lotoha'apai United	1

=== Final stage ===
In the final stage (group stage, semi-finals and final), there were 95 goals in 29 matches, for an average of 3.28 per match.

Rank	Player	Team	Goals
1	(Nigeria) Sanni Issa	(Fiji) Ba	9
2	(England) Adam Dickinson	(New Zealand) Auckland City	8
3	(Spain) Manel Expósito	(New Zealand) Auckland City	6
3	(Fiji) Roy Krishna	(New Zealand) Waitakere United	6
5	(French Polynesia) Teaonui Tehau	(French Polynesia) Dragon	4
6	(Fiji) Malakai Tiwa	(Fiji) Ba	3
6	(Croatia) Mario Bilen	(New Zealand) Auckland City	3
6	(Spain) Gustavo Souto	(New Zealand) Auckland City	3
6	(England) Darren White	(New Zealand) Auckland City	3
6	(England) Chris Palmer	(New Zealand) Waitakere United	3
6	(Solomon Islands) Moffat Kilifa	(Solomon Islands) Solomon Warriors	3
6	(Vanuatu) Fenedy Masauvakalo	(Vanuatu) Amicale	3
13	(Fiji) Tuimasi Manuca	(Fiji) Ba	2
13	(New Caledonia) Jean-Pierre Bob	(New Caledonia) Mont-Dore	2
13	(New Caledonia) Romain Painbéni	(New Caledonia) Mont-Dore	2
13	(New Zealand) Alex Feneridis	(New Zealand) Auckland City	2
13	(New Zealand) Jake Butler	(New Zealand) Waitakere United	2
13	(New Zealand) Chad Coombes	(New Zealand) Waitakere United	2
13	(Papua New Guinea) Raymond Gunemba	(Papua New Guinea) Hekari United	2
13	(Solomon Islands) Gagame Feni	(Solomon Islands) Solomon Warriors	2
13	(Solomon Islands) Joses Nawo	(Vanuatu) Amicale	2
22	(Fiji) Laisenia Raura Naioko	(Fiji) Ba	1
22	(Fiji) Abbu Zahid Shaheed	(Fiji) Ba	1
22	(Fiji) Avinesh Suwamy	(Fiji) Ba	1
22	(New Caledonia) Loïc Bessières	(New Caledonia) Mont-Dore	1
22	(New Caledonia) Dan Vakie	(New Caledonia) Mont-Dore	1
22	(Wales) Chris Bale	(New Zealand) Auckland City	1
22	(Spain) Albert Riera	(New Zealand) Auckland City	1
22	(Argentina) Emiliano Tade	(New Zealand) Auckland City	1
22	(South Africa) Ryan De Vries	(New Zealand) Waitakere United	1
22	(Papua New Guinea) Nigel Dabinyaba	(Papua New Guinea) Hekari United	1
22	(Papua New Guinea) Kema Jack	(Papua New Guinea) Hekari United	1
22	(Solomon Islands) Joachim Waroi	(Papua New Guinea) Hekari United	1
22	(Solomon Islands) Kidston Billy	(Solomon Islands) Solomon Warriors	1
22	(Solomon Islands) Micah Lea'alafa	(Solomon Islands) Solomon Warriors	1
22	(French Polynesia) Steevy Chong Hue	(French Polynesia) Dragon	1
22	(French Polynesia) Sylvain Graglia	(French Polynesia) Dragon	1
22	(French Polynesia) Andre Teikihakaupoko	(French Polynesia) Dragon	1
22	(French Polynesia) Nicolas Vallar	(French Polynesia) Dragon	1
22	(Vanuatu) Alphonse Bongnaim	(Vanuatu) Amicale	1
22	(Vanuatu) Dominique Fred	(Vanuatu) Amicale	1
22	(Senegal) Papa Gueye	(Vanuatu) Amicale	1

Own goals
Rank	Player	Team	Goals	Opponent
1	(New Zealand) Ivan Vicelich	(New Zealand) Auckland City	1	(French Polynesia) Dragon

== See also ==
- 2013 FIFA Club World Cup
