= 2010 OFC Champions League final =

- Event: 2009–10 OFC Champions League
PRK Hekari United	Waitakere United
(Papua New Guinea)	(New Zealand)
4	2

First leg
PRK Hekari United	Waitakere United
3	0
- Date: 17 April 2010
- Venue: PMRL Stadium, Port Moresby
- Referee: Gerard Parsons (Australia)
- Attendance: 15,000

Second leg
Waitakere United	PRK Hekari United
2	1
- Date: 2 May 2010
- Venue: Fred Taylor Park, Auckland
- Referee: Norbert Hauata (Tahiti)
- Attendance: 3,000

The 2010 OFC Champions League final was played over two legs between the winner of Group A Waitakere United from New Zealand and the winner of Group B PRK Hekari United from Papua New Guinea in the 2009–10 OFC Champions League. PRK Hekari United were crowned champions after defeating Waitakere United 4–2 on aggregate, ending New Zealand's dominance in the tournament since its inception in 2007.

== Road to the final ==
=== Waitakere United ===
Throughout the opening round, Waitakere United had been in a two-horse race between themselves and fellow NZFC club Auckland City FC who had won the previous season's Champions League. An early slip up against New Caledonian club AS Magenta saw the club slip to third in the group, however a strong performance in the return leg saw Waitakere win 4–1 at home and a 5–1 thrashing of Tahiti's AS Manu-Ura saw them draw level once more with Auckland City. The final game of the group drew them against their Auckland rivals away from home. A draw for Waitakere would see them progress to the final on goal difference, and the game finished 2–2, knocking favourites Auckland out of the competition.

=== PRK Hekari United ===
Like Waitakere United, Hekari started poorly in their group. A 3–3 draw against Tafea FC and a 2–1 loss at home to Lautoka F.C. saw them languishing at the bottom of the table. However their luck would change, defeating Tafea FC 4–0 in the return leg would see Hekari move back up the table and in contention to qualify for the final. Wins against Lautoka F.C. and a 4–1 thrashing of Solomon Islands team Marist FC would see Hekari progress through to the final, a point above Lautoka.

== Match summaries ==
=== Leg 1 ===
17 April 2010
15:00 UTC+10

PRK Hekari United (Papua New Guinea)	3 – 0	(New Zealand) Waitakere United
Kema Jack 27', 73'; Alick Maemae 49'	Report

PMRL Stadium, Port Moresby
Attendance: 15,000
Referee: Gerard Parsons (Australia)

=== Leg 2 ===
2 May 2010
14:00 UTC+12

Waitakere United (New Zealand)	2 – 1	(Papua New Guinea) PRK Hekari United
Neil Emblen 3'; Brent Fisher 84' (pen.)	Report	Kema Jack 35' (pen.)

Fred Taylor Park, Auckland
Attendance: 3,000
Referee: Norbert Hauata (Tahiti)

Team 1	Agg.	Team 2	1st leg	2nd leg
PRK Hekari United (Papua New Guinea)	4–2	(New Zealand) Waitakere United	3–0	2–1

== First Match ==
17 April 2010
15:00 UTC+10

PRK Hekari United (Papua New Guinea)	3 – 0	(New Zealand) Waitakere United
Kema Jack 27' 73'; Alick Maemae 48'	Report

PMRL Stadium, Port Moresby
Attendance: 15,000

Hekari United:
DF	2	(Solomon Islands) Gideon Omokirio
DF	4	(Papua New Guinea) Cyril Muta
FW	9	(Fiji) Tuimasi Manuca		(substituted off) 76'
MF	12	(Papua New Guinea) David Muta (c)		(substituted off) 87'
MF	16	(Fiji) Pita Bolaitoga
FW	17	(Papua New Guinea) Kema Jack
DF	19	(Papua New Guinea) Koriak Upaiga
GK	20	(Papua New Guinea) Gure Gabina
MF	25	(Solomon Islands) Stanley Waita
MF	26	(Solomon Islands) Alick Maemae	(yellow card) 45'
MF	28	(Solomon Islands) Henry Fa'arodo
Substitutes:
GK	1	(Papua New Guinea) Godfrey Baniau
DF	5	(Papua New Guinea) Brian Tuhiana
MF	7	(Solomon Islands) Benjamin Mela		(substituted on) 87'
MF	8	(Papua New Guinea) Michael Foster
MF	13	(Papua New Guinea) Andrew Lepani
FW	18	(Papua New Guinea) Eric Komeng		(substituted on) 76'
MF	23	(Papua New Guinea) Samuel Kini
Manager:
(Solomon Islands) Jerry Allen

Waitakere United:
GK	1	(England) Daniel Robinson
DF	2	(New Zealand) Jason Rowley
DF	3	(New Zealand) Aaron Soctt		(substituted off) 78'
DF	4	(New Zealand) Timothy Myers	(yellow card) 34'
MF	7	(England) Martin Bullock
FW	8	(New Zealand) Brent Fisher
FW	9	(Solomon Islands) Benjamin Totori		(substituted off) 88'
MF	11	(England) Neil Sykes (c)
FW	12	(Fiji) Roy Krishna
MF	16	(England) Neil Emblen
DF	21	(New Zealand) Jack Pelter		(substituted off) 84'
Substitutes:
MF	10	(New Zealand) Allan Pearce		(substituted on) 78'
FW	13	(Brazil) Dimas Da Silva
MF	18	(New Zealand) Zane Sole
MF	19	(New Zealand) Dakota Lucas		(substituted on) 88'
FW	20	(South Africa) Ryan De Vries
GK	22	(New Zealand) Liam Little
MF	27	(Wales) Paul Seaman		(substituted on) 84'
Manager:
(England) Neil Emblen

Referee:
(Australia) Gerard Parsons

Assistant referees:
(Australia) Murray Wilson
(Australia) Alex Glasgow
Fourth official:
(Solomon Islands) John Saohu

== Second Match ==
2 May 2010
14:00 UTC+12

Waitakere United (New Zealand)	2 – 1	(Papua New Guinea) PRK Hekari United
Neil Emblen 3'; Brent Fisher 84' (pen.)	Report	Kema Jack 35'

Fred Taylor Park, Auckland
Attendance: 3,000

Waitakere United:
GK	1	(England) Daniel Robinson	(yellow card) 32'
DF	2	(New Zealand) Jason Rowley
DF	4	(New Zealand) Timothy Myers
MF	7	(England) Martin Bullock	(yellow card) 36'
FW	8	(New Zealand) Brent Fisher
FW	9	(Solomon Islands) Benjamin Totori		(substituted off) 70'
MF	10	(New Zealand) Allan Pearce	(yellow card) 67'
MF	11	(England) Neil Sykes		(substituted off) 61'
FW	12	(Fiji) Roy Krishna		(substituted off) 57'
DF	16	(England) Neil Emblen
MF	17	(New Zealand) Jake Butler (c)
Substitutes:
DF	3	(New Zealand) Aaron Soctt
MF	18	(New Zealand) Zane Sole
MF	19	(New Zealand) Dakota Lucas		(substituted on) 70'
FW	20	(South Africa) Ryan De Vries		(substituted on) 57'
DF	21	(New Zealand) Jack Pelter		(substituted on) 61'
GK	22	(New Zealand) Liam Little
FW	24	(New Zealand) Luke Adams
Manager:
(England) Neil Emblen

Hekari United:
DF	2	(Solomon Islands) Gideon Omokirio
DF	4	(Papua New Guinea) Cyril Muta	(yellow card) 27'
FW	9	(Fiji) Tuimasi Manuca	(yellow card) 43'	(substituted off) 80'
MF	12	(Papua New Guinea) David Muta (c)
MF	16	(Fiji) Pita Bolaitoga	(yellow card) 69'
FW	17	(Papua New Guinea) Kema Jack
DF	19	(Papua New Guinea) Koriak Upaiga
GK	20	(Papua New Guinea) Gure Gabina
MF	25	(Solomon Islands) Stanley Waita
MF	26	(Solomon Islands) Alick Maemae
MF	28	(Solomon Islands) Henry Fa'arodo
Substitutes:
GK	1	(Papua New Guinea) Godfrey Baniau
DF	5	(Papua New Guinea) Brian Tuhiana
MF	7	(Solomon Islands) Benjamin Mela
MF	8	(Papua New Guinea) Michael Foster
FW	11	(Solomon Islands) Joachim Waroi		(substituted on) 80'
MF	13	(Papua New Guinea) Andrew Lepani
FW	18	(Papua New Guinea) Eric Komeng
Manager:
(Solomon Islands) Jerry Allen

Referee:
(French Polynesia) Norbert Hauata

Assistant referees:
(Fiji) Ashwin Kumar
(Vanuatu) Michael Joseph
Fourth official:
(Fiji) Rakesh Varman

== Champion ==
OFC Champions League
2009–10 winners

PRK Hekari United
First title
