= 2014 OFC Champions League final =

- Event: 2013–14 OFC Champions League
| Amicale | Auckland City |
| (Vanuatu) | (New Zealand) |
| 2 | 3 |
- on aggregate

First leg
| Amicale | Auckland City |
| 1 | 1 |
- Date: 10 May 2014
- Venue: Port Vila Municipal Stadium, Port Vila
- Referee: Kader Zitouni (Tahiti)

Second leg
| Auckland City | Amicale |
| 2 | 1 |
- Date: 18 May 2014
- Venue: Kiwitea Street, Auckland
- Referee: Norbert Hauata (Tahiti)

The 2014 OFC Champions League final was the final of the 2013–14 OFC Champions League, the 13th edition of the Oceania Cup, Oceania's premier club football tournament organized by the Oceania Football Confederation (OFC), and the 8th season under the current OFC Champions League name.

The final was contested in two-legged home-and-away format between Amicale of Vanuatu and Auckland City of New Zealand. The first leg was hosted by Amicale at Port Vila Municipal Stadium in Port Vila on 10 May 2014, while the second leg was hosted by Auckland City at Kiwitea Street in Auckland on 18 May 2014. The winner earned the right to represent the OFC at the 2014 FIFA Club World Cup, entering at the qualifying play-off round. Both finalists also earned invitations to participate in the 2014 OFC President's Cup.

The first leg ended in a 1–1 draw, and Auckland City won the second leg 2–1, giving them a record-setting sixth OFC club title.

== Background ==
Amicale had played in one previous OFC Champions League final, where they lost to Auckland City 6–1 on aggregate in 2011. Auckland City were the three-time defending champions and had played in five previous finals, winning all of them in 2006, 2009, 2011, 2012, and 2013.

The two teams were drawn into Group B of this season's group stage with Nadi of Fiji and Dragon of Tahiti. Both Amicale and Auckland City won their first two matches, and Amicale won 1–0 in the final match to finish top of the group stage, while Auckland City also advanced to the semi-finals as the best runner-up. In the semi-finals, Amicale eliminated Ba of Fiji, while Auckland City eliminated Pirae of Tahiti.

== Road to final ==
Note: In all results below, the score of the finalist is given first.

| (Vanuatu) Amicale | | Round | (New Zealand) Auckland City | |
|---|---|---|---|---|
| Opponent | Result | Group stage (Host: Fiji) | Opponent | Result |
| (French Polynesia) Dragon | 1–0 | Group stage (Host: Fiji) | (Fiji) Nadi | 3–0 |
| (Fiji) Nadi | 6–0 | Group stage (Host: Fiji) | (French Polynesia) Dragon | 3–0 |
| (New Zealand) Auckland City | 1–0 | Group stage (Host: Fiji) | (Vanuatu) Amicale | 0–1 |
| Group B winner: Team / Pld / W / D / L / GF / GA / GD / Pts; (Vanuatu) Amicale / 3 / 3 / 0 / 0 / 8 / 0 / +8 / 9; (New Zealand) Auckland City / 3 / 2 / 0 / 1 / 6 / 1 / +5 / 6; (French Polynesia) Dragon / 3 / 1 / 0 / 2 / 5 / 4 / +1 / 3; (Fiji) Nadi / 3 / 0 / 0 / 3 / 0 / 14 / −14 / 0; Source: | | Group stage (Host: Fiji) | Group B runner-up: Team / Pld / W / D / L / GF / GA / GD / Pts; (Vanuatu) Amicale / 3 / 3 / 0 / 0 / 8 / 0 / +8 / 9; (New Zealand) Auckland City / 3 / 2 / 0 / 1 / 6 / 1 / +5 / 6; (French Polynesia) Dragon / 3 / 1 / 0 / 2 / 5 / 4 / +1 / 3; (Fiji) Nadi / 3 / 0 / 0 / 3 / 0 / 14 / −14 / 0; Source: | |
| (Fiji) Ba | 2–1 (away) | Semi-finals (Home-and-away) | (French Polynesia) Pirae | 3–0 (home) |
| (Fiji) Ba | 0–0 (home) | Semi-finals (Home-and-away) | (French Polynesia) Pirae | 1–2 (away) |
| Amicale won 2–1 on aggregate. | | Semi-finals (Home-and-away) | Auckland City won 4–2 on aggregate. | |

== Rules ==
The final was played on a home-and-away two-legged basis. The away goals rule, extra time and penalty shoot-out were used to decide the winner if necessary.

== Matches ==
=== First leg ===
10 May 2014
14:00 UTC+11

| Amicale (Vanuatu) | 1–1 | (New Zealand) Auckland City |
|---|---|---|
| Fred 75' | Report | Tade 29' |

Port Vila Municipal Stadium, Port Vila
Attendance: 10,000
Referee: Kader Zitouni (Tahiti)

| Amicale | Auckland City |

| GK | 1 | (Vanuatu) Chikau Mansale |
| DF | 4 | (Italy) Davide Talone |
| DF | 17 | (Solomon Islands) Nelson Sale Kilifa (c) | (yellow card) 90' |
| DF | 31 | (Serbia) Marko Đorđević |
| DF | 34 | (Scotland) Colin Marshall |
| MF | 6 | (Fiji) Shivan Swamy | | (substituted off) 68' |
| MF | 9 | (Fiji) Esava Naqeleca | (yellow card) 84' |
| MF | 29 | (Vanuatu) Dominique Fred |
| FW | 10 | (Serbia) Nikola Vasilić | | (substituted off) 54' |
| FW | 22 | (Vanuatu) Fenedy Masauvakalo |
| FW | 30 | (Solomon Islands) Jack Wetney | | (substituted off) 76' |
Substitutes:
| GK | 20 | (Australia) Michael Rutherford |
| DF | 21 | (Vanuatu) Paul Young |
| DF | 25 | (Fiji) Ilaitia Tuilau |
| MF | 8 | (Serbia) Milan Matić |
| MF | 16 | (Vanuatu) Daniel Natou |
| MF | 35 | (Solomon Islands) Richard Anisua |
| FW | 11 | (Nigeria) Sanni Issa | | (substituted on) 68' |
| FW | 13 | (Vanuatu) François Sakama | | (substituted on) 76' |
| FW | 24 | (Vanuatu) Kensi Tangis | | (substituted on) 54' |
Manager:
(Australia) Nathan Hall

| GK | 1 | (New Zealand) Tamati Williams | (yellow card) 63' |
| DF | 3 | (Japan) Takuya Iwata |
| DF | 4 | (Croatia) Mario Bilen | | (substituted off) 77' |
| DF | 6 | (England) John Irving |
| DF | 15 | (New Zealand) Ivan Vicelich (c) |
| DF | 22 | (New Zealand) Andrew Milne |
| MF | 23 | (England) Sam Burfoot |
| MF | 26 | (United States) Sean Morris |
| FW | 10 | (South Africa) Ryan De Vries |
| FW | 17 | (Portugal) João Moreira | | (substituted off) 72' |
| FW | 20 | (Argentina) Emiliano Tade | | (substituted off) 49' |
Substitutes:
| GK | 18 | (England) Louie Caunter |
| DF | 7 | (New Zealand) James Pritchett |
| MF | 16 | (South Korea) Kim Dae-wook | | (substituted on) 77' |
| MF | 21 | (New Zealand) Mario Ilich |
| FW | 19 | (Papua New Guinea) David Browne | | (substituted on) 49' |
| FW | 25 | (New Zealand) Sean Lovemore | | (substituted on) 72' |
Manager:
(Spain) Ramon Tribulietx

Assistant referees:
Terry Piri (Cook Islands)
Didier Hmuzo (New Caledonia)
Fourth official:
Isidore Assiene-Ambassa (New Caledonia)

=== Second leg ===
18 May 2014
14:00 UTC+12

| Auckland City (New Zealand) | 2–1 | (Vanuatu) Amicale |
|---|---|---|
| De Vries 67'; Tade 87' | Report | Tangis 45+1' |

Kiwitea Street, Auckland
Attendance: 3,000
Referee: Norbert Hauata (Tahiti)

| Auckland City | Amicale |

| GK | 1 | (New Zealand) Tamati Williams |
| DF | 3 | (Japan) Takuya Iwata |
| DF | 4 | (Croatia) Mario Bilen |
| DF | 6 | (England) John Irving |
| DF | 15 | (New Zealand) Ivan Vicelich (c) | (yellow card) 27' |
| DF | 22 | (New Zealand) Andrew Milne | (yellow card) 90' |
| MF | 16 | (South Korea) Kim Dae-wook |
| MF | 23 | (England) Sam Burfoot | | (substituted off) 66' |
| FW | 10 | (South Africa) Ryan De Vries | | (substituted off) 90+1' |
| FW | 17 | (Portugal) João Moreira | | (substituted off) 78' |
| FW | 20 | (Argentina) Emiliano Tade | (yellow card) 88' |
Substitutes:
| GK | 18 | (England) Louie Caunter |
| DF | 7 | (New Zealand) James Pritchett |
| MF | 9 | (England) Darren White | | (substituted on) 90+1' |
| MF | 21 | (New Zealand) Mario Ilich |
| MF | 26 | (United States) Sean Morris | | (substituted on) 78' |
| FW | 19 | (Papua New Guinea) David Browne | | (substituted on) 66' |
| FW | 25 | (New Zealand) Sean Lovemore |
Manager:
(Spain) Ramon Tribulietx

| GK | 1 | (Vanuatu) Chikau Mansale (c) |
| DF | 4 | (Italy) Davide Talone |
| DF | 25 | (Fiji) Ilaitia Tuilau | (yellow card) 32' |
| DF | 31 | (Serbia) Marko Đorđević |
| DF | 34 | (Scotland) Colin Marshall |
| MF | 9 | (Fiji) Esava Naqeleca | (yellow card) 15' |
| MF | 29 | (Vanuatu) Dominique Fred |
| FW | 11 | (Nigeria) Sanni Issa | | (substituted off) 62' |
| FW | 22 | (Vanuatu) Fenedy Masauvakalo |
| FW | 24 | (Vanuatu) Kensi Tangis |
| FW | 30 | (Solomon Islands) Jack Wetney | | (substituted off) 69' |
Substitutes:
| GK | 20 | (Australia) Michael Rutherford |
| DF | 18 | (Vanuatu) Robert Tom |
| DF | 21 | (Vanuatu) Paul Young |
| MF | 6 | (Fiji) Shivan Swamy |
| MF | 8 | (Serbia) Milan Matić |
| MF | 16 | (Vanuatu) Daniel Natou |
| MF | 35 | (Solomon Islands) Richard Anisua |
| FW | 10 | (Serbia) Nikola Vasilić | | (substituted on) 62' |
| FW | 13 | (Vanuatu) François Sakama | | (substituted on) 69' |
Manager:
(Australia) Nathan Hall

Assistant referees:
Tevita Makasini (Tonga)
Phillipe Revel (Tahiti)
Fourth official:
Averii Jacques (Tahiti)
