= Takuya Iwata (footballer, born 1983) =

Japanese footballer

Takuya Iwata 岩田卓也
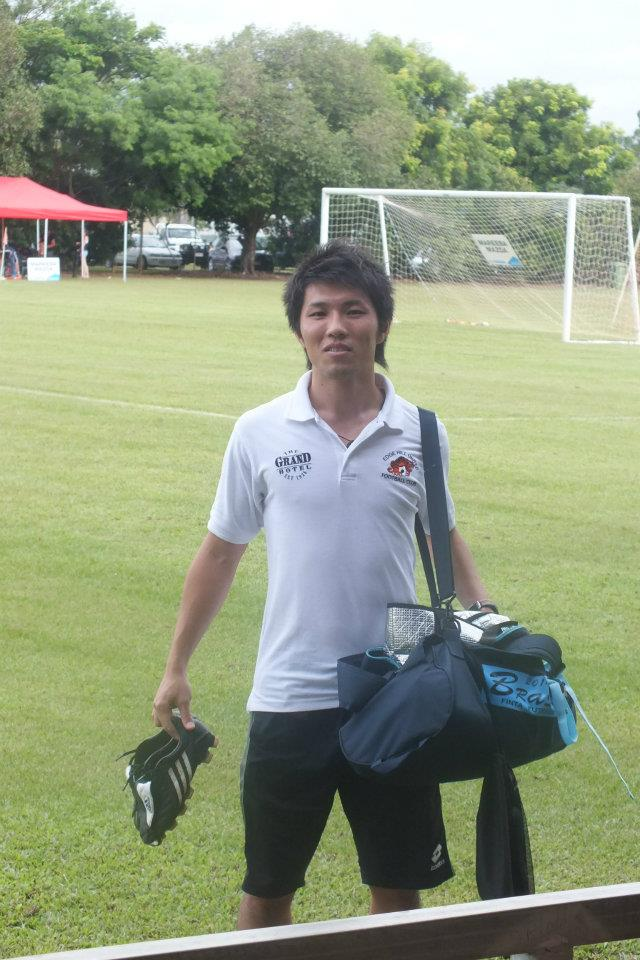
- Takuya Iwata in 2012

Personal information
- Full name: Takuya Iwata
- Date of birth: 22 April 1983 (age 43)
- Place of birth: Aichi Prefecture, Japan
- Height: 1.73 m (5 ft 8 in)
- Position: Left back

Team information
- Current team: Onehunga Mangere United
- Number: 20

Youth career
- 1999–2001: Gifu Technical High School
- 2002–2005: Hamamatsu University

Senior career*
| Years | Team | Apps | (Gls) |
| 2006 | FC Gifu | | |
| 2007–2009 | FC Gifu B | | |
| 2010–2011 | Edge Hill United | | |
| 2012 | Far North Queensland FC | | |
| 2012–2019 | Central United | | |
| 2012–2019 | Auckland City | 81 | (2) |
| 2020 | Western Springs | | |
| 2020–2021 | Hayabusa Eleven | | |
| 2021–2022 | Fukui United | | |
| 2022–2023 | Auckland City | 19 | (0) |
| 2024 | Western Springs | 21 | (0) |
| 2025– | Onehunga Mangere United | | |
- * Club domestic league appearances and goals as of 25 November 2024

Takuya Iwata (岩田 卓也, Iwata Takuya; born 22 April 1983) is a Japanese footballer who plays as a left back for Northern League club Onehunga Mangere United.

== Club career ==
=== Japan ===
Iwata began his football career with Gifu Technical High School between 1999 and 2001. Then he went to study at Hamamatsu University, where he also played for the college football team from 2002 and 2005. In 2006, Iwata began to play with FC Gifu. At the end of the 2006 season he was transferred to the club's B team, in which he played between 2007 and 2009.

=== Australia ===
In 2010, Iwata was signed by Edge Hill United in Cairns for the Far North Queensland Premier League in Australia . This club played there until 2011. Iwata was part of the team that won the 2011 Far North Queensland Premier League, and was named the club MVP. In addition, that season's Edge Hill United won the Matsuda Cup. In 2012, he went to play with Far North Queensland Bulls FC in the Queensland State League. Before the end of the season he was transferred again.

=== New Zealand ===
In 2012, Iwata was signed by Central United in the Northern League (New Zealand). In August, Central United won the 2012 Chatham Cup Final against Lower Hutt City AFC where they won by 6–1.

Iwata began to play with Auckland City FC in October 2012, becoming was part of the bronze medal-winning team at the 2014 FIFA Club World Cup. Iwata played the entire game in the match against Cruz Azul to decide third place. That and a friendly between Auckland City and the Japan National Football Team have earned Iwata considerable press coverage in Japan.

== Honours ==
Edge Hill United

- Far North Queensland Premier League: 2011
- Matsuda Cup: 2011

Central United

- Chatham Cup: 2012

Auckland City

- FIFA Club World Cup 2014 Bronze Medal
- OFC Champions League 2013, 2014, 2024
- ASB Premiership 2013-14
- OFC President's Cup 2014
- ASB Charity Cup 2013

Individual

- Edge Hill United Player of the Year: 2011
- Central United FC – Most Improved Player: 2012
- Auckland City FC Sportsman of the Year: 2013, 2014
