= Danny Robinson =

English footballer and manager

Dan Robinson
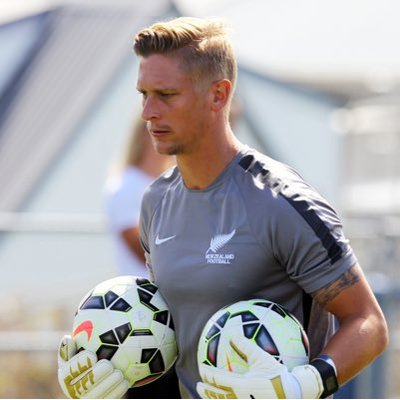
- Robinson in 2016

Personal information
- Full name: Daniel Mark Robinson
- Date of birth: 1 September 1982 (age 44)
- Place of birth: Derby, United Kingdom
- Position: Goalkeeper

Team information
- Current team: Peterborough United (assistant manager)

Youth career
- 1995–1999: Derby County
- 1999–2001: Blackpool

Senior career*
Years	Team	Apps	(Gls)
2001–2005	Burton Albion	1	
2004	→ Ilkeston Town (loan)	4	
2004	→ Gisborne City (loan)	8	
2005–2007	Gisborne City	36	
2006–2008	Waikato FC	42	
2008	Hamilton Wanderers		
2009	Lynn Avon United		
2010–2011	Bay Olympic		
2012	Waitakere City		
2015–2016	Birkenhead United		
2008–2016	Waitakere United		

Managerial career
- 2006–2007: Waikato FC Youth
- 2010–2012: New Zealand U-20 Women (GK coach)
- 2012: Waitakere City
- 2012–2014: New Zealand Women (GK coach)
- 2014–2016: New Zealand Women (assistant coach)
- 2026–: Peterborough United (assistant manager)
- * Club domestic league appearances and goals

Dan Robinson (born 1 September 1982) is an English football coach and former goalkeeper. He is currently the assistant manager of Peterborough United.

Robinson is a four-time winner of the New Zealand Football Championship (NZFC) with Waitakere United and in 2014 was named as the best goalkeeper of that competition's first decade. He was also the first goalkeeper to play 100 games in the New Zealand Football Championship.

As a player he has been to one FIFA Club World Cup and has also coached, as either an assistant coach or goalkeeping coach, at four FIFA tournaments including the 2012 Olympic Games and the 2015 FIFA Women's World Cup.

== Playing career ==
=== Early career ===
Robinson began his career playing for Derby County playing for the schoolboys team from the age of 11 to 16. In 1999, at the age of 17, he signed as an apprentice at Blackpool and played two years at youth and reserve team levels. In 2001, he signed a professional contract with Burton Albion, who were then under the management of Nigel Clough. During four seasons with the Brewers the bulk of his first team appearances would come in cup competitions. He made his one and only league appearance for Burton Albion in January 2003 in a Football Conference fixture away to Scarborough and was sent off on debut in the 4–1 defeat.

=== Move to New Zealand ===
In 2004, Robinson joined New Zealand side Gisborne City on loan and in 2005 he returned on a permanent basis, also taking the role as the club's academy director.

After two seasons of winter regional football with Gisborne, Robinson signed with Waikato FC for the 2006-07 New Zealand Football Championship. He would return for one more winter season with Gisborne between his first two summers in the national league with Waikato. Since 2008, Robinson has played national league football in the summer for Waitakere United but he has played for various regional clubs in the winter including Hamilton Wanderers, Bay Olympic, Lynn-Avon United and Birkenhead United.

=== Waitakere United ===
In 2008, Robinson moved to Auckland to develop his coaching career and sign for then Oceania Champions Waitakere United, who had qualified for the 2008 FIFA Club World Cup. Robinson started five league games and two OFC Champions League games in his first season with Waitakere United but was on the bench for their FIFA Club World Cup playoff defeat to Adelaide United as well as the NZFC Grand Final defeat to Auckland City.

The following season, he established himself as the first choice goalkeeper, playing all but one match for Waitakere as they claimed their second New Zealand title and finished runners-up in the 2010 OFC Champions League.

Between 2009–10 and 2012–13, with Robinson as the first choice goalkeeper, Waitakere won an unprecedented four straight NZFC titles, added two more minor premierships and one Charity Cup win. They would also make two OFC Champions League finals but lost them both.

On 27 January 2013, towards the end of this period of domestic success, Robinson also became the first goalkeeper to play 100 matches in the NZFC. The following season, as part of the marking of the first ten seasons of the franchise-based format of the national league, Robinson was named as the league's Goalkeeper of the Decade and was also named to the Team of the Decade. The awards were chosen by a public vote and a panel of football writers.

The 2013-14 season marked the start of a rebuilding phase for Waitakere and they finished fourth in the league, losing to Auckland City in the semifinals. The following season, they would again lose to Auckland City in the semifinals after finishing fourth in the regular season. Robinson was named captain for the 2014–15 season. In the 2015–16 season Robinson reduced his playing role with Waitakere to fulfill his full-time coaching duties with the New Zealand women's team.

== Coaching career ==
Following a three-month loan to Gisborne City in 2004, former New Zealand coach Kevin Fallon enticed Robinson to return on a permanent basis in 2005 with a full-time contract that included a role as the club's academy director.

He continued to balance playing and coaching roles when he signed for Waikato FC in the New Zealand Football Championship, coaching the club's U-20 team in the National Youth League for one season. While playing in Gisborne and the Waikato he also held development roles with Central Football Federation and Waikato-Bay of Plenty Football.

Robinson moved to Auckland move in 2008 partly to pursue more coaching opportunities. His first international role came as goalkeeper coach for the New Zealand U-20 Women for the 2010 FIFA U-20 Women's World Cup in Germany and he would retain the same role for the 2012 FIFA U-20 Women's World Cup in Japan.

He was elevated to the goalkeeper coach role for the senior women's team in 2012 ahead of the London Olympics where the team lost in the quarterfinals to eventual gold medal winners, USA. The same year Robinson also coached Waitakere City in the premier division of the Northern Region Football League.

Northern Football Federation appointed Robinson as a Football Development Officer in February 2013 with a regional responsibility for clubs in the West Auckland area.

In 2014, his coaching role with the Football Ferns became full-time with additional responsibility for overseeing the development of U-17 and U-20 women's goalkeepers. His current title with the New Zealand Women's Team is Assistant Coach specialising in goalkeeping.

In September 2016, he moved back to England and returned to his first club Burton Albion to take up the role of academy manager.

On 16 October 2026, after being the head of the academy. Robinson was appointed assistant manager at Peterborough United following the appointment of Robbie Savage.

== Personal life ==
Robinson is married and has one child. He is a lifelong fan of Derby County F.C. His father, Phil, was a match official in the Football League and his Robinson's younger brother, Adam, is lead sports scientist at Derby County's Academy.

== Honours ==
=== Player ===
==== Club ====
Waitakere United

- New Zealand Football Championship: (4) 2009–10, 2010–11, 2011–12, 2012–13
- New Zealand Football Championship Minor Premiers: (3) 2008–09, 2010–11, 2012–13
- OFC Champions League Runners-up: (2) 2009–10, 2012–13
- ASB Charity Cup: 2012
- New Zealand Football Championship Runners-up: 2008–09

Bay Olympic

- Northern League (New Zealand): 2011

Burton Albion

- Northern Premier League: 2001–02

=== Other individual honours ===
- OFC Champions League Golden Glove (best goalkeeper): 2012–13
- New Zealand Football Championship Goalkeeper of the Decade (2004/05–2013/14)
- New Zealand Football Championship Team of the Decade (2004/05–2013/14)

=== Records ===
- First goalkeeper to play 100 matches in the New Zealand Football Championship
