= Tamati Williams =

New Zealand footballer (born 1984)

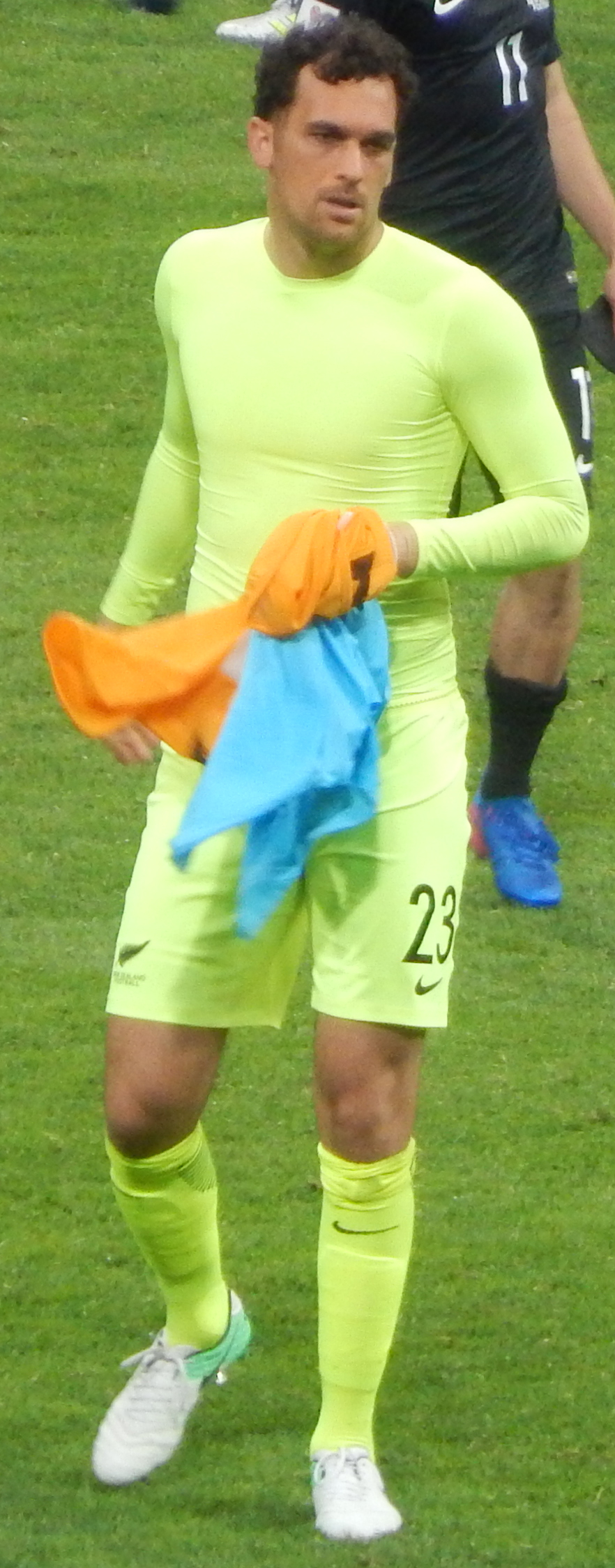
- Williams with New Zealand in 2017

Personal information
- Full name: Tamati Andre Williams
- Date of birth: 19 January 1984 (age 42)
- Place of birth: Dunedin, Otago, New Zealand
- Height: 1.92 m (6 ft 4 in)
- Position: Goalkeeper

Senior career*
Years	Team	Apps	(Gls)
2003–2004	Football Kingz		
2004–2005	Waikato		
2005–2007	University-Mount Wellington		
2007–2008	Auckland City	18	(0)
2008–2011	Forrest Hill Milford		
2011–2015	Auckland City	48	(0)
2016–2017	RKC Waalwijk	42	(0)
2017	AaB	0	(0)

International career
- New Zealand U17
- New Zealand U20
- New Zealand U23
2014	New Zealand	1	(0)
- * Club domestic league appearances and goals

Tamati Andre Williams (born 19 January 1984) is a New Zealand former professional footballer and fashion model. He played as a goalkeeper and made one appearance for the New Zealand national team.

== Club career ==
After unsuccessful trials with Blackburn Rovers and Stockport County in England at the age of 18, Williams began his club career with Football Kingz FC in their final season in the now-defunct National Soccer League. After a period with ASB Premiership side Waikato FC, Williams played one season for Auckland City in 2007 before temporarily retiring from football to work as a fashion model.

Williams joined Danish Superliga club AaB in summer 2017. He served as a backup to Jacob Rinne, while Michael Lansing was out with an injury. He left the club at the end of the year.

== International career ==
Williams represented New Zealand at the under-17, under-20, and under-23 Olympic levels. He made his debut as a full international against South Africa, when he replaced his colleague Glen Moss as a second-half substitute.

== Modeling career ==
As a fashion model, Williams has represented brands such as Calvin Klein and Esprit, and has worked in the United States, France, Italy, and Australia. In 2007, he was featured on an episode of America's Next Top Model, appearing in a beach photo with Cycle 8 winner Jaslene Gonzalez. He is represented by the agencies Red11 in Auckland, and Chic Management in Sydney.

== Personal life ==
Williams was born in Dunedin, and lived for a period in his childhood in Whangārei. His father played rugby union for Otago. As of 2014, Williams was studying for a postgraduate diploma in zoology and conservation biology.

He is of Māori descent, and holds a Dutch passport through a grandparent.

== Honours ==
Uni-Mount Wellington

- Chatham Cup: 2003

Auckland City

- ASB Premiership: 2014
- OFC Champions League: 2012, 2013, 2014, 2015
- FIFA Club World Cup bronze medal: 2014
