= 2007–08 OFC Champions League =

Tournament details
- Dates: June 12, 2007 – May 4, 2008
- Teams: 9 (from 8 associations)

Final positions
- Champions: (New Zealand) Waitakere United (2nd title)
- Runners-up: (Solomon Islands) Kossa

Tournament statistics
- Matches played: 17
- Goals scored: 53 (3.12 per match)
- Top scorer(s): (Solomon Islands) James Naka (Solomon Islands) Joe Luwi (4 goals each)

The 2007–08 OFC Champions League was the 7th edition of the Oceanian Club Championship, Oceania's premier club football tournament organized by the Oceania Football Confederation (OFC), and the 2nd season under the current OFC Champions League name. The qualifying round was held at Stade Numa-Daly in Nouméa, New Caledonia, from 12 to 16 February 2007, with the main competition taking the form of a home and away group stage followed by a knockout round, which was played from 27 October 2007 until 11 May 2008.

The qualifying round was contested by teams from the three lowest ranked nations in Oceania and Vanuatu, who lost their automatic qualification place due to the withdrawal of their representative in the previous year's competition.

The winner of the tournament was Waitakere Utd of New Zealand, who reclaimed their title by beating Kossa FC of the Solomon Islands in the two legged final. The winners claimed Oceania's US$1 million (NZ$1.41 million) berth in the 2008 FIFA Club World Cup in Japan.

== Participants ==
Location of teams of the 2007–08 OFC Champions League.

The following teams entered the competition.

Association	Team	Qualifying method
Teams entering the group stage
Fiji	Ba F.C.	2007 Fiji National Football League first stage champion
New Zealand	Auckland City	2006–07 New Zealand Football Championship grand final champion
New Zealand	Waitakere United	2006–07 New Zealand Football Championship regular season premier
Solomon Islands	Kossa	2006–07 Solomon Islands National Club Championship champion
(French Polynesia) Tahiti	Manu-Ura	2005–06 Tahiti Division Fédérale champion
Teams entering the preliminary round
Cook Islands	Nikao Sokattak (Note: Nikao Sokattak withdrew from the competition.)	2006 Cook Islands Round Cup champion
New Caledonia	Baco	2006–07 New Caledonia Super Ligue champion
Papua New Guinea	University Inter	2006 Papua New Guinea overall final champion
Vanuatu	Tafea FC	2007 VFF Bred Cup winner

== OFC O-League preliminary tournament ==
The Preliminary Tournament was played at Stade Numa-Daly Magenta in Nouméa, New Caledonia.

Team	Pld	W	D	L	GF	GA	GD	Pts	Qualification
(Vanuatu) Tafea	2	2	0	0	10	1	+9	6	Advance to group stage
(New Caledonia) Baco	2	1	0	1	2	5	−3	3	
(Papua New Guinea) University Inter	2	0	0	2	1	7	−6	0	
(Cook Islands) Nikao Sokattack	0	0	0	0	0	0	0	0	Withdrew

Date	Home	Score	Away
Jun 12	Baco	2–0	University Inter
Jun 14	Tafea	5–1	University Inter
Jun 16	Tafea	5–0	Baco

== Group stage ==
=== Group A ===
Pos	Team	Pld	W	D	L	GF	GA	GD	Pts	WAI	AUC	MU
1	(New Zealand) Waitakere United	4	2	2	0	5	3	+2	8		1–1	2–1
2	(New Zealand) Auckland City	4	2	1	1	8	2	+6	7	0–1		6–0
3	(French Polynesia) Manu-Ura	4	0	1	3	2	10	−8	1	1–1	0–1	

=== Group B ===
Pos	Team	Pld	W	D	L	GF	GA	GD	Pts	KOS	TAF	BA
1	(Solomon Islands) Kossa	4	2	2	0	8	4	+4	8		1–1	2–0
2	(Vanuatu) Tafea	4	1	2	1	4	4	0	5	1–1		2–1
3	(Fiji) Ba F.C.	4	1	0	3	4	8	−4	3	2–4	1–0	

== Final ==
Team 1	Agg.	Team 2	1st leg	2nd leg
Kossa (Solomon Islands)	3–6	(New Zealand) Waitakere United	3–1	0–5

2008-04-26
14:00 UTC+11

Kossa (Solomon Islands)	3–1	(New Zealand) Waitakere United
Luwi 21' 41'; Naka 85'	(Report)	Perry 49'

Lawson Tama Stadium, Honiara, Solomon Islands
Attendance: 20,000
Referee: Rakesh Varman (Fiji)

Kossa FC:
4	(Solomon Islands) Tome Faisi
5	(Solomon Islands) Samson Takayama
6	(Solomon Islands) Mahlon Maemania
10	(Solomon Islands) Francis Nee
11	(Solomon Islands) Joe Luwi
13	(Solomon Islands) James Naka
15	(Solomon Islands) Seni Ngava
16	(Solomon Islands) Paul Wale	(substituted off) 89'
17	(Solomon Islands) Gideon Omokirio
19	(Papua New Guinea) Reginald Davani	(yellow card) 47'
21	(Solomon Islands) Severino Aefi
Substitutes:
1	(Solomon Islands) John Morgan
3	(Solomon Islands) Sam Maemania
8	(Solomon Islands) Philip Ashley
9	(Solomon Islands) Samsom Waahero
12	(Solomon Islands) Roy Enori
14	(Solomon Islands) Terry Oiaka
20	(Solomon Islands) Willie Sade	(substituted on) 89'
Manager:
(Solomon Islands) Jacob Moli

Waitakere United:
GK	1	(New Zealand) Richard Gillispie
DF	2	(New Zealand) Jonathan Perry
DF	6	(England) Darren Bazeley
FW	8	(Solomon Islands) Commins Menapi	(yellow card) 77'	(substituted off) 78'
FW	9	(Solomon Islands) Benjamin Totori
FW	10	(New Zealand) Allan Pearce		(substituted off) 87'
MF	11	(England) Neil Sykes
MF	13	(Croatia) Daniel Koprivcic		(substituted off) 43'
MF	15	(Wales) Christopher Bale
MF	16	(England) Neil Emblen
MF	17	(New Zealand) Jake Butler
Substitutes:
DF	5	(New Zealand) Danny Hay
MF	7	(New Zealand) Jason Hayne		(substituted on) 43'
MF	14	(New Zealand) Hoani Edwards		(substituted on) 78'
DF	20	(New Zealand) Jason Rowley
DF	21	(New Zealand) Graham Pearce		(substituted on) 87'
GK	22	(New Zealand) Simon Eaddy
Manager:
(New Zealand) Chris Milicich

Referee:
(Fiji) Rakesh Varman

Assistant referees:
(Fiji) Andrew Achari
(Vanuatu) Mahit Chilia
Fourth official:
(Vanuatu) Lencie Fred

2008-05-11
14:00 UTC+12

Waitakere United (New Zealand)	5–0	(Solomon Islands) Kossa FC
Totori 8'; Emblen 25'; Pearce 72' 77'; Butler 85'	(Report)

Trusts Stadium, Waitakere City, New Zealand
Attendance: 6,000
Referee: Ben Williams (Australia)

Waitakere United:
GK	1	(New Zealand) Richard Gillispie
DF	2	(New Zealand) Jonathan Perry
DF	5	(New Zealand) Danny Hay	(yellow card) 21'	(substituted off) 62'
MF	7	(New Zealand) Jason Hayne
FW	9	(Solomon Islands) Benjamin Totori		(substituted off) 64'
FW	10	(New Zealand) Allan Pearce
MF	11	(England) Neil Sykes
MF	13	(Croatia) Daniel Koprivcic		(substituted off) 89'
MF	15	(Wales) Christopher Bale
MF	16	(England) Neil Emblen
MF	17	(New Zealand) Jake Butler
Substitutes:
DF	6	(England) Darren Bazeley		(substituted on) 62'
FW	8	(Solomon Islands) Commins Menapi		(substituted on) 64'
DF	20	(New Zealand) Jason Rowley		(substituted on) 89'
DF	21	(New Zealand) Graham Pearce
GK	22	(New Zealand) Simon Eaddy
DF	24	(New Zealand) Tim Myers
Manager:
(New Zealand) Chris Milicich

Kossa FC:
4	(Solomon Islands) Tome Faisi
5	(Solomon Islands) Samson Takayama
6	(Solomon Islands) Mahlon Maemania
10	(Solomon Islands) Francis Nee
11	(Solomon Islands) Joe Luwi
13	(Solomon Islands) James Naka
15	(Solomon Islands) Seni Ngava
16	(Solomon Islands) Paul Wale	(substituted off) 74'
17	(Solomon Islands) Gideon Omokirio
19	(Papua New Guinea) Reginald Davani
21	(Solomon Islands) Severino Aefi
Substitutes:
3	(Solomon Islands) Sam Maemania
8	(Solomon Islands) Philip Ashley
9	(Solomon Islands) Samsom Waahero
12	(Solomon Islands) Roy Enori
14	(Solomon Islands) Terry Oiaka
20	(Solomon Islands) Willie Sade	(substituted on) 74'
Manager:
(Solomon Islands) Jacob Moli

Referee:
(Australia) Benjamin Williams

Assistant referees:
(Tonga) Tevita Makasini
(Vanuatu) Michael Joseph
Fourth official:
(French Polynesia) Norbert Hauata

Waitakere United win 6–3 on aggregate and advance to the 2008 FIFA Club World Cup.

OFC Champions League
2007–2008 Winners
(New Zealand)
Waitakere United
Second title

== Top goal-scorers ==
#	Player	Team	Goals
1	(Solomon Islands) James Naka	(Solomon Islands) Kossa	4
1	(Solomon Islands) Joe Luwi	(Solomon Islands) Kossa	4
3	(South Africa) Keryn Jordan	(New Zealand) Auckland City	2
3	(Fiji) Avinesh Suwamy	(Fiji) Ba F.C.	2
3	(New Zealand) Allan Pearce	(New Zealand) Waitakere United	2
Last updated May 11, 2008
