= Chris Palmer (footballer) =

English footballer (born 1983)

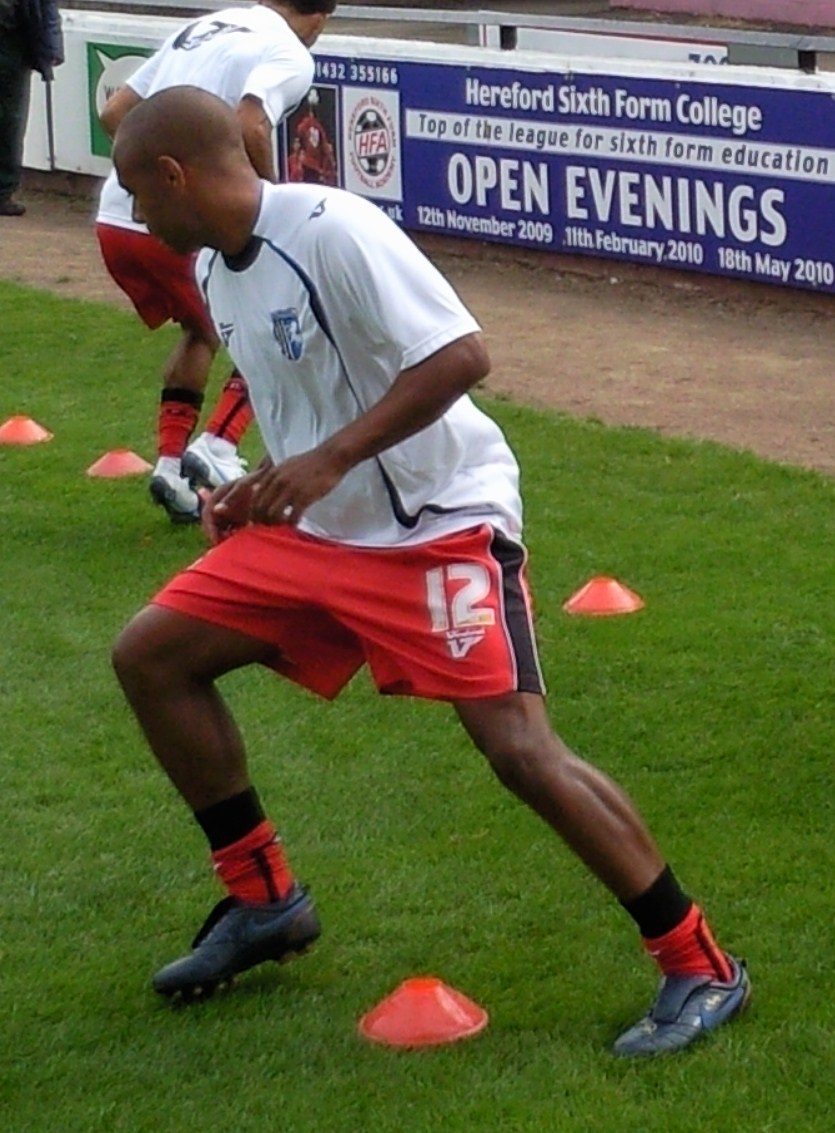

Personal information
- Date of birth: 16 October 1983 (age 43)
- Place of birth: Derby, England
- Positions: Midfielder; defender

Senior career*
Years	Team	Apps	(Gls)
2002–2004	Derby County	0	(0)
2004	→ Hereford United (loan)	3	(0)
2004–2006	Notts County	54	(5)
2006–2008	Wycombe Wanderers	33	(0)
2007	→ Darlington (loan)	4	(0)
2008–2009	Walsall	44	(1)
2009–2011	Gillingham	38	(5)
2011–2013	Burton Albion	43	(3)
2013	Waitakere United		
2013	Ilkeston	8	(1)
2013	Oxford City	8	(0)
2013–2014	Rainworth Miners Welfare		
2014	Mickleover Sports		
2014	Tamworth	5	(0)
Total		240	(15)
- * Club domestic league appearances and goals

Christopher Palmer (born 16 October 1983) is an English former professional footballer who made more than 200 appearances in the Football League, as a midfielder.

== Playing career ==
Palmer was born in Derby and attended Derby Moor Community School. He began his professional career with Derby County, but did not establish himself as a first-team member. He then joined Notts County in 2004, from where he went out to Hereford United on loan for a month, making three appearances. He was given a first-team place on his return, making 24 appearances and scoring four goals.

Palmer signed for Wycombe Wanderers in the summer of 2006. He initially held down a place in the first team, but struggled to win back his place after a shoulder injury. He went on loan to Darlington in August 2007. After being released by Wycombe he signed for Walsall on 1 August 2008, after a successful trial period with the club.

On 6 July 2009, Palmer joined Football League One side Gillingham. On 17 June 2011, Palmer moved to Football League Two side Burton Albion.

Following his release from Burton Albion, Palmer joined Waitakere United in New Zealand on a short-term contract. He scored three goals for Waitakere in the group stages of the 2012–13 OFC Champions League and played in the final, which they lost 2–1 to Auckland City. He later returned to England to play for Northern Premier League Premier Division side Ilkeston on non-contract terms on 16 August 2013, where he was joined by his former Burton Albion colleague Aaron Webster. He made nine appearances for the Robins in all competitions, scoring once.

On 3 October 2013, Palmer left Ilkeston and signed for Conference North side Oxford City. On 29 January 2014, Palmer signed for Conference Premier side Tamworth, but after five appearances Palmer was released by the club on 27 February 2014.
