= Nikola Vasilić =

Serbian footballer (born 1989)

Personal information
- Full name: Nikola Vasilić
- Date of birth: January 30, 1989 (age 37)
- Place of birth: Belgrade, Yugoslavia
- Height: 6 ft 3 in (1.91 m)
- Position: Forward

Youth career
- 2005–2007: Obilić
- 2007–2008: Porto
- 2008–2009: Teleoptik
- 2008–2009: Snagov
- 2009–2010: BASK

Senior career*
Years	Team	Apps	(Gls)
2010	Mladi Radnik	9	(2)
2011	Elbasani	5	(0)
2011	BASK		
2011–2012	Sinđelić Niš	20	(5)
2012	Novi Sad	3	(0)
2013	San Antonio Scorpions	5	(1)
2013–2014	Amicale	7	(3)
2014	Victoria Hotspurs		
2015	Pembroke Athleta		
2015	Rudar Kakanj	4	(0)
2015–2021	SV Donaustauf	132	(109)
2021–2022	SpVgg SV Weiden	26	(15)
2022–2023	PKB Padinska Skela		
- * Club domestic league appearances and goals as of June 23, 2013

Nikola Vasilić (born January 30, 1989) is a Serbian retired footballer.

== Career ==
Vasilić began his career in 2010 with Mladi Radnik and later competed for KS Elbasani, Sinđelić Niš and Novi Sad, all in Eastern Europe. He moved to the US when he signed for NASL club San Antonio Scorpions on February 19, 2013 and then played in the OFC Champions League for Vanuatuan powerhouse Amicale.

He joined Pembroke Athleta from Gozitan side Victoria Hotspurs in February 2015.
