= Sanni Issa =

Nigerian footballer (born 1991)

Personal information
- Date of birth: 17 August 1991 (age 35)
- Place of birth: Kano, Nigeria
- Position: Forward

Senior career*
Years	Team	Apps	(Gls)
2010–2011	Lautoka		
2011–2012	Rewa		
2012	Suva		
2012–2013	Ba FA		
2013–2014	Amicale		
2014	WaiBOP United		
2014–2015	Auckland City	4	(0)
2016	WaiBOP United	6	(2)
- Lynn-Avon United
2017	Ba FA		
2018	Manukau United	19	(19)
2018–2019	Waitakere United	8	(2)
2019–2021	Manukau United	44	(21)
2020	Coastal Spirit	2	(4)
2021	Birkenhead United		
2022	Christchurch United	10	(11)
2022–2023	Rewa		
- * Club domestic league appearances and goals

Sanni Issa (born 17 August 1991) is a Nigerian professional footballer who plays as a forward.

== Career ==
Born in Nigeria, Issa moved to Oceania in 2010 to join Fijian club Lautoka. He also played for Rewa and Suva in Fiji, before joining Ba FA in 2012. While at Ba, he became both the top goalscorer and best player at the 2012–13 OFC Champions League, scoring nine goals as Ba reached the semi-finals.

In 2013, following the Fiji Football Association's decision to ban foreign players from league competitions, Issa moved to Vanuatu to join Amicale, where he helped them reach the 2014 OFC Champions League final, losing to Auckland City. In August 2014, he trialed with both Mangere United and Auckland City, and eventually signed for WaiBOP United in September, but issues over his visa requirements meant Issa didn't play a match for them.

In December 2014, he joined Auckland City, and was chosen as part of their 2014 FIFA Club World Cup squad in Morocco, where he scored the winning goals in two penalty shootouts as Auckland City finished third. Issa later signed for WaiBOP United in January 2016, but decided to terminate his contract in September.

In February 2017, Issa returned to Ba FA. In 2020, he was playing for Manukau United. After two stints at Manukau United and one at Waitakere United between 2018 and 2021, he joined Birkenhead United in June 2021.

In July 2022, Issa rejoined Rewa ahead of the 2022 OFC Champions League group stage, later spending the 2023 Fiji Premier League season at the club.
