= Alex Feneridis =

New Zealand footballer

Personal information
- Full name: Alex Feneridis
- Date of birth: 13 November 1989 (age 37)
- Place of birth: Wellington, New Zealand
- Height: 1.86 m (6 ft 1 in)
- Position: Midfielder

Team information
- Current team: Glenfield Rovers

Senior career*
Years	Team	Apps	(Gls)
2006–2014	Auckland City	76	(13)
2014–2016	Team Wellington	25	(3)
2016–	Glenfield Rovers		

International career
2012	New Zealand U-23	1	(0)
- * Club domestic league appearances and goals as of 7 February 2016

Alex (Alexander) Feneridis (Greek: Άλεξ (Αλέξανδρος) Φενερίδης) is a New Zealand football player of Greek heritage who plays for Team Wellington.

Alex Feneridis is the son of businessman and horse breeder Costa Feneridis, who in turn is a grandson of Arcady (Arcadios) Feneridis, New Zealand Chess Champion in 1957. Alex has a younger sister, former Auckland schoolgirls tennis champion Danielle Feneridis.

Feneridis started his career with Auckland City, playing there for eight years. In September 2014, Feneridis opted to leave Auckland City and join Team Wellington.

== International career ==
He was also in the New Zealand Olympic team in London 2012 and made an appearance against Egypt.

== Honours ==
Auckland City FC

- OFC Champions League (5): 2008–09, 2010–11, 2011–12, 2012–13, 2013–14
- New Zealand Football Championship Premiers (3): 2009–10, 2011–12, 2013–14
- New Zealand Football Championship Champions (2): 2009, 2014
- Charity Cup (2): 2011, 2013

Team Wellington

- Charity Cup: 2014
- New Zealand Football Championship Champions: 2016
