= Gustavo Souto =

Spanish footballer

Personal information
- Full name: Gustavo Souto Sampedro
- Date of birth: 19 April 1983 (age 43)
- Place of birth: Vigo, Spain
- Height: 1.80 m (5 ft 11 in)
- Position: Striker

Senior career*
Years	Team	Apps	(Gls)
2002–2004	Choco		
2004–2005	Porriño Industrial	30	(13)
2005–2006	Alondras	35	(19)
2006–2007	Langreo	18	(3)
2007–2008	Villa Santa Brígida	50	(24)
2008–2009	Racing Ferrol	14	(2)
2009	Atlético Ciudad	15	(6)
2009–2010	Guadalajara	14	(9)
2010–2011	Eibar	14	(2)
2011	Logroñés	13	(1)
2011–2012	Teruel	30	(7)
2012	FC Kairat	9	(2)
2013	Auckland City	7	(4)
2013–2014	Ourense	31	(6)
2014–2015	Alondras	26	(5)
2015	Auckland City	0	(0)
2015–2016	Rápido Bouzas	24	(8)
- * Club domestic league appearances and goals

Gustavo Souto Sampedro (born 19 April 1983) is a Spanish retired footballer who played as a forward.

== Club career ==
Souto started his senior career with CD Choco. In 2012, he signed for Kairat in the Kazakhstan Premier League, where he made nine league appearances and scored two goals. After that, he played for New Zealand club Auckland City, and Spanish clubs Ourense CF, Alondras CF, and Rápido de Bouzas before retiring in 2016.

After retiring, Souto started working as a financial advisor in his home country.
