= Neil Sykes =

English footballer

Personal information
- Date of birth: 17 December 1974 (age 51)
- Place of birth: Doncaster, England
- Height: 1.78 m (5 ft 10 in)
- Position: Midfielder

Youth career
- Sheffield Wednesday

Senior career*
Years	Team	Apps	(Gls)
1999–2002	Central United		
2005–2007	Auckland City		
2007–2011	Waitakere City		
- * Club domestic league appearances and goals

Neil Sykes (born 17 December 1974) is an English former professional footballer who played as a midfielder.

== Career ==
Sykes played in New Zealand with Central United, Auckland City and Waitakere City, appearing in the OFC Champions League and FIFA Club World Cup. He won the New Zealand Football Championship five times, and the OFC Champions League twice. In November 2010, Sykes made his 100th appearance in the ASB Premiership.
