= Roger Manuel =

Cook Islands footballer

Personal information
- Full name: Roger Manuel
- Date of birth: 10 November 1988 (age 37)
- Place of birth: Cook Islands
- Position: Midfielder

Team information
- Current team: Tupapa Maraerenga (assistant)

Senior career*
Years	Team	Apps	(Gls)
2011–2025	Tupapa Maraerenga		

International career
2009–2011	Cook Islands	4	(0)

Managerial career
- Tupapa Maraerenga (assistant)
- 2026–: Cook Islands U15 (assistant)
- * Club domestic league appearances and goals

Roger Manuel (born 10 November 1988) in the Cook Islands is a former international footballer who played as a midfielder for Tupapa Maraerenga and the Cook Islands national football team.

== National team Matches ==
2009-06-13

Tonga-Cook Islands 1-2 Friendly National Academy Stadium

2011-08-27

Papua New Guinea-Cook Islands 4-0 Pacific Games 2011 - Group B Stade Boéwa

2011-09-01

Cook Islands-Kiribati 3-0 Pacific Games 2011 - Group B Stade Boéwa

2011-09-03

Cook Islands-Fiji 1-4 Pacific Games 2011 - Group B Stade Boéwa

2011-11-22

Cook Islands-Samoa 2-3 World Cup 2014 - First Round Football Federation Samoa Football Stadium
