= 2013–14 New Zealand Football Championship =

ASB Premiership
- Season: 2013–14
- Champions: Auckland City FC
- Premiers: Auckland City FC
- OFC Champions League: Auckland City FC; Team Wellington
- Matches: 61
- Goals: 234 (3.84 per match)
- Top goalscorer: Emiliano Tade (12)
- Biggest home win: Team Wellington 6 – 1 Hawke's Bay United
- Biggest away win: Southern United 0 – 10 Auckland City FC
- Highest scoring: Southern United 0 – 10 Auckland City FC

The New Zealand Football Championship's 2013–14 season (known as the ASB Premiership for sponsorship reasons) will be the tenth season of the NZFC since its establishment in 2004. The home and away season will begin on 10 November 2013 with the final scheduled to be on 16 March 2014. Auckland City and Waitakere United will represent the ASB Premiership in the 2013–14 OFC Champions League after finishing Champions and Runners-up respectively in the 2012–13 competition. Two franchises have had changes to the clubs branding for this season, with Otago United changing to Southern United and Waikato FC changing to Waibop United. YoungHeart Manawatu has been replaced with Wanderers SC, which aims to give young football players top level matches under the New Zealand Football High Performance Strategy.

== Clubs ==
| Team | Location | Stadium | Capacity | Manager | Captain | Kit manufacturer | Shirt sponsor |
|---|---|---|---|---|---|---|---|
| Auckland City FC | Auckland | Kiwitea Street | 3,500 | (Spain) Ramon Tribulietx | | Nike | Trillian Trust Inc. |
| Canterbury United | Christchurch | ASB Football Park | 9,000 | (New Zealand) Keith Braithwaite | | Samurai | Robbie's Bar and Bistro |
| Hawke's Bay United | Napier | Bluewater Stadium | 5,000 | (New Zealand) Chris Greatholder | | Lotto Sport Italia | Kinetic Electrical |
| Southern United | Dunedin | Forsyth Barr Stadium | 30,500 | (Brazil) Luis Uehura | | Lotto Sport Italia | Gran's Remedy |
| Team Wellington | Wellington | David Farrington Park | 3,000 | (New Zealand) Matt Calcott | | Adidas | Exodus Health & Fitness Club |
| WaiBOP United | Cambridge | John Kerkhof Park | 2,000 | (Scotland) Peter Smith | | Nike | The Soccer Shop |
| Waitakere United | West Auckland | Fred Taylor Park | 2,500 | (New Zealand) Paul Temple & Brian Shelley | | Lotto Sport Italia | Cuesports Foundation |
| Wanderers SC | Albany | North Harbour Stadium | 25,000 | (New Zealand) Darren Bazeley | | Nike | Trillian Trust Inc. |

== Regular season ==
=== League table ===
| Pos | Team | Pld | W | D | L | GF | GA | GD | Pts | Qualification |
|---|---|---|---|---|---|---|---|---|---|---|
| 1 | Auckland City (C) | 14 | 10 | 3 | 1 | 40 | 12 | +28 | 33 | Qualified for the Champions League and Premiership Finals |
| 2 | Team Wellington | 14 | 8 | 2 | 4 | 37 | 25 | +12 | 26 | Qualified for the Champions League and Premiership Finals |
| 3 | Hawke's Bay United | 14 | 8 | 2 | 4 | 29 | 28 | +1 | 26 | Qualified for the Premiership Finals |
| 4 | Waitakere United | 14 | 7 | 2 | 5 | 30 | 19 | +11 | 23 | Qualified for the Premiership Finals |
| 5 | Canterbury United | 14 | 6 | 4 | 4 | 22 | 16 | +6 | 22 | |
| 6 | WaiBOP United | 14 | 4 | 2 | 8 | 24 | 31 | −7 | 14 | |
| 7 | Southern United | 14 | 3 | 1 | 10 | 19 | 50 | −31 | 10 | |
| 8 | Wanderers SC | 14 | 1 | 2 | 11 | 19 | 39 | −20 | 5 | |

(C) Champions

=== Fixtures and results ===
==== Round 1 ====
Saturday, 10 November 2013

| 1:00pm Sunday | Waibop United | 2–1 | Canterbury United | Rotorua International Stadium, Rotorua |
| | Miloš Nikolić 41'; Maksim Manko 78' | Report | Dan Terris 7' | Attendance: 324; Referee: Chris Kerr |

| 1:00pm Sunday | Southern United | 0–3 | Waitakere United | Forsyth Barr Stadium, Dunedin |
| | | Report | Richard Cardozo 43', 73'; Dan Morgan 62' | Attendance: 400; Referee: Nick Waldron |

| 2:00pm Sunday | Team Wellington | 1–4 | Auckland City FC | David Farrington Park, Wellington |
| | Jamie de Abreu 22' | Report | Darren White 10'; David Browne 80'; Alex Feneridis 90'; Mario Bilen 90' | Referee: Matt Conger |

==== Round 2 ====
Saturday, 16 November 2013

| 2:00pm Saturday | Wanderers SC | 2–2 | Canterbury United | North Harbour Stadium, Auckland |
| | Scott Doney 18'; Finn Cochrane 90+4' | Report | Frederico Marquez 44'; Damien Hirst 49' (o.g.) | Attendance: 453; Referee: Peter O'Leary |

| 5:00pm Saturday | Hawke's Bay United | 3–2 | Southern United | Bluewater Stadium, Napier |
| | Tom Mosquera 36', 68'; Sean Lovemore 80' | Report | Daniel Morris 10'; Campbell Higgins 26' | Attendance: 487; Referee: J. Rowbury |

Sunday, 17 November 2013

| 2:00pm Sunday | Auckland City FC | 3–1 | Waibop United | Kiwitea Street, Auckland |
| | Roy Krishna 45+3'; Adam Dickinson 84'; David Browne 90+3' | Report | Maksim Manko 2' | Attendance: 1200; Referee: Isaac Trevis |

| 4:00pm Sunday | Waitakere United | 2–0 | Team Wellington | Fred Taylor Park, West Auckland |
| | Jordan Lowdon 42'; Richie Cardozo 48' | Report | | Attendance: 417; Referee: Mirko Benischke |

==== Round 3 ====
Saturday, 23 November 2013

| 5:00pm Saturday | Waibop United | 0–2 | Hawke's Bay United | John Kerkhof Park, Cambridge |
| | | Report | Sean Morris 71'; Thomas Mosquera 86' | Attendance: 422; Referee: Nick Waldron |

Sunday, 24 November 2013

| 2:00pm Sunday | Canterbury United | 0–0 | Auckland City FC | ASB Football Park, Christchurch |
| | | Report | | Attendance: 600; Referee: John Rowbury |

| 2:00pm Sunday | Team Wellington | 3–1 | Southern United | David Farrington Park, Wellington |
| | Henry Fa'arodo 19', 79'; Charlie Henry 30' | Report | Henrique Alves Viana 5' |

| 4:00pm Sunday | Waitakere United | 4–1 | Wanderers SC | Fred Taylor Park, West Auckland |
| | Ian Hogg 29'; Jake Butler 45+1'; Dylan Stansfield 52'; Jordon Lowdon 70' | Report | Stuart Holthusen 90+1' (pen.) | Attendance: 375; Referee: Matt Conger |

==== Round 4 ====
Saturday, 30 November 2013

| 2:00pm Saturday | Auckland City FC | 2–0 | Waitakere United | Kiwitea Street, Auckland |
| | Chris Bale 31'; Darren White 90+1' | Report | | Attendance: 1274; Referee: Peter O'Leary |

Sunday, 1 December 2013

| 12:00pm Sunday | Hawke's Bay United | 1–2 | Team Wellington | Bluewater Stadium, Napier |
| | Aaron Jones 53' | Report | Charlie Henry 54'; Hamish Watson 61' | Attendance: 310; Referee: I. Trevis |

| 2:00pm Sunday | Southern United | 0–3 | Canterbury United | Rugby Park, Invercargill |
| | | Report | Aaron Clapham 42'; Federico Marquez 66'; Russell Kamo 75' | Attendance: 150; Referee: John Rowbury |

| 2:00pm Sunday | Wanderers SC | 3–3 | Waibop United | North Harbour Stadium, Auckland |
| | Ben Thomas 3'; Elijiah Neblett 71'; Nick Sugden 90+7' | Report | Milos Nikolic 11'; Masaki Nomoto 32'; Maksim Manko 60' | Attendance: 349; Referee: Mirko Benischke |

==== Round 5 ====
Saturday, 7 December 2013

| 5:00pm Saturday | Waibop United | 4–2 | Southern United | John Kerkhof Park, Cambridge |
| | Milos Nikolic 31' (pen.), 85'; Shaydon Young 45'; Reid Drake 61' | Report | Henrique Alves Viana 71'; Matt Joy 90' | Attendance: 461; Referee: Antony Riley |

Sunday, 8 December 2013

| 2:00pm Sunday | Canterbury United | 2–0 | Team Wellington | ASB Football Park, Christchurch |
| | Aaron Clapham 1' (pen.), 27' | Report | | Referee: Campbell-Kirk Waugh |

| 4:00pm Sunday | Waitakere United | 2–2 | Hawke's Bay United | Fred Taylor Park, West Auckland |
| | Richie Cardozo 19'; Dylan Stansfield 38' | Report | Danny Wilson 9'; Tom Biss 90' | Attendance: 378; Referee: John Rowbury |

==== Round 6 ====
Saturday, 14 December

| 2:45pm Saturday | Team Wellington | 3–2 | Wanderers SC | Westpac Stadium, Wellington |
| | Henry Fa'arodo 8'; Cam Lindsay 40'; Charlie Henry 57' (pen.) | Report | Scott Doney 30'; Elijah Neblett 75' | Attendance: 278; Referee: Nick Waldron |

| 4:00pm Saturday | Waitakere United | 3–0 | Waibop United | Fred Taylor Park, West Auckland |
| | Sam French 13', 77'; Jarrod Young 87' | Report | | Attendance: 257; Referee: Campbell Kirk-Waugh |

| 5:00pm Saturday | Hawke's Bay United | 1–0 | Canterbury United | Bluewater Stadium, Napier |
| | Tom Biss 75' | Report | | Attendance: 419; Referee: Mirko Benischke |

==== Round 7 ====
Sunday, 22 December 2013

| 2:00pm Sunday | Canterbury United | 3–2 | Waitakere United | ASB Football Park, Christchurch |
| | Aaron Clapham 19', 32' (pen.); Danny Boys 49' | Report | Dylan Stansfield 51'; Richie Cardozo 82' | Attendance: 620; Referee: Nick Waldron |

| 2:00pm Sunday | Auckland City FC | 4–4 | Hawke's Bay United | Kiwitea Street, Auckland |
| | Cristobal Marquez 34', 56'; Emiliano Tade 53', 71' | Report | David Mulligan 31'; Tom Biss 32'; Sean Lovemore 40'; Aaron Jones 77' | Attendance: 765; Referee: Antony Riley |

| 2:00pm Sunday | Wanderers SC | 1–2 | Southern United | North Harbour Stadium, Auckland |
| | Michael Den Heijer 68' | Report | Andrew Ridden 41'; Henrique Alves Viana 51' | Attendance: 200; Referee: Matt Conger |

| 4:05pm Sunday | Team Wellington | 3–2 | Waibop United | Westpac Stadium, Wellington |
| | Henry Fa'arodo 4'; Cole Peverley 32'; Cory Chettleburgh 60' | | Adam Cowan 28' (o.g.); Maksim Manko 41' | Referee: Peter O'Leary |

==== Round 8 ====
Sunday, 12 January 2014

| 1:00pm Sunday | Waitakere United | 1–3 | Southern United | Fred Taylor Park, West Auckland |
| | Tim Myers 39' | Report | Henrique Alves Viana 3'; Peter Rae 43'; Logan Wright-Webb 68' | Attendance: 200; Referee: Matt Conger |

| 2:00pm Sunday | Auckland City FC | 3–2 | Team Wellington | Kiwitea Street, Auckland |
| | Emiliano Tade 10' (pen.), 61'; Ryan de Vries 53' | Report | Henry Fa'arodo 80'; Charlie Henry 83' | Attendance: 900; Referee: Nick Waldron |

| 2:00pm Sunday | Canterbury United | 1–0 | Waibop United | ASB Football Park, Christchurch |
| | Federico Marquez 56' | Report | | Attendance: 550; Referee: Peter O'Leary |

| 3:00pm Sunday | Wanderers SC | 1–3 | Hawke's Bay United | North Harbour Stadium, Auckland |
| | Stuart Holthusen 10' | Report | Sean Morris 24'; Tomas Mosquera 35', 52' | Attendance: 154; Referee: John Rowbury |

- Due to a breach of player eligibility regulations, the match between Wanderers SC and Hawke's Bay United on 12 January – originally a 1–3 win to Hawke's Bay United – has been awarded as a 3–0 win to Wanderers SC.

==== Round 9 ====
Saturday, 18 January 2014

| 5:00pm Saturday | Southern United | 1–6 | Hawke's Bay United | Forsyth Barr Stadium, Dunedin |
| | Taylor McCormack 65' | Report | Aaron Jones 19'; Nathaniel Hailemariam 40', 65'; Tom Biss 71'; Bill Robertson 85'; Harley Rodeka 90+1' | Attendance: 250; Referee: Mirko Benischke |

| 5:00pm Saturday | Waibop United | 0–2 | Auckland City FC | John Kerkhof Park, Cambridge |
| | | Report | Emiliano Tade 38'; Darren White 90+1' | Attendance: 671; Referee: Campbell Kirk-Waugh |

Sunday, 19 January 2014

| 2:00pm Sunday | Canterbury United | 2–0 | Wanderers SC | ASB Football Park, Christchurch |
| | Russell Kamo 38'; Michael White 85' | | | Attendance: 600; Referee: Isaac Trevis |

| 3:00pm Sunday | Team Wellington | 3–1 | Waitakere United | David Farrington Park, Wellington |
| | Joel Stevens 14'; Cole Peverley 60'; Hamish Watson 86' | Report | Jordan Lowdon 62' | Referee: Brian Botha |

==== Round 5 Catch Up ====
Wednesday, 22 January 2014

| 6:00pm Wednesday | Wanderers SC | 0–2 | Auckland City FC | North Harbour Stadium, Auckland |
| | | Report | Alex Feneridis 59'; Emiliano Tade 90+4' | Attendance: 435; Referee: Mirko Benitschke |

==== Round 10 ====
Saturday, 25 January 2014

| 5:00pm Saturday | Hawke's Bay United | 3–2 | Waibop United | Bluewater Stadium, Napier |
| | Tom Biss 8'; Bill Robertson 11'; Sean Lovemore 28' | Report | Jack McNab 42'; Sam Messam 83' | Attendance: 482; Referee: Matt Conger |

Sunday, 26 January 2014

| 2:00pm Sunday | Southern United | 2–2 | Team Wellington | Forsyth Barr Stadium, Dunedin |
| | Jacob Schneider 2'; Regan Coldicott 63' | Report | Henry Fa'arodo 6'; Joel Stevens 60' | Referee: Campbell-Kirk Waugh |

| 2:00pm Sunday | Auckland City FC | 1–1 | Canterbury United | Kiwitea Street, Auckland |
| | Adam Dickinson 8' | Report | Aaron Clapham 59' | Attendance: 932; Referee: Mirko Benischke |

| 2:00pm Sunday | Wanderers SC | 1–6 | Waitakere United | North Harbour Stadium, Auckland |
| | Andre De Jong 58' | Report | Jordan Lowdon 36'; Maksim Manko 44'; Dylan Stansfield 48', 61'; Richie Cardozo 67'; Sansern Limwatthana 89' | Attendance: 343; Referee: Antony Riley |

==== Round 11 ====
Saturday, 1 February 2014

| 2:00pm Saturday | Waibop United | 3–1 | Wanderers SC | Links Ave, Tauranga |
| | Jack McNab 45+2', 61'; Masaki Nomoto 80' | Report | Adam Mitchell 64' | Attendance: 383; Referee: Nick Waldron |

Sunday, 2 February 2014

| 2:00pm Sunday | Canterbury United | 2–0 | Southern United | ASB Football Park, Christchurch |
| | Russell Kamo 48'; Aaron Clapham 55' | Report | | Attendance: 600; Referee: Antony Riley |

| 2:00pm Sunday | Team Wellington | 6–1 | Hawke's Bay United | David Farrington Park, Wellington |
| | Charlie Henry 47', 83'; Henry Fa'arodo 68'; Joel Stevens 78'; Hamish Watson 86', 90' | Report | Sean Morris 24' (pen.) | Referee: Mirko Benischke |

| 4:00pm Sunday | Waitakere United | 1–0 | Auckland City FC | Fred Taylor Park, West Auckland |
| | Maksim Manko 3' | Report | | Attendance: 679; Referee: Matt Conger |

==== Round 1 Catch Up ====
Thursday, 6 February 2014

| 2:00pm Thursday | Hawke's Bay United | 1–0 | Wanderers SC | Bluewater Stadium, Napier |
| | Harley Rodeka 50' | Report | | Attendance: 333; Referee: Anthony Riley |

==== Round 6 Catch Up ====
Thursday, 6 February 2014

| 2:00pm Thursday | Auckland City FC | 3–0 | Southern United | Kiwitea Street, Auckland |
| | Alex Feneridis 27'; Darren White 34'; Sam Burfoot 72' | Report | | Attendance: 743; Referee: John Rowbury |

==== Round 12 ====
Sunday, 9 February 2014

| 1:00pm Sunday | Southern United | 1–6 | Waibop United | Forsyth Barr Stadium, Dunedin |
| | Daniel Morris 88' | Report | Nik Robson 10', 20', 54', 58'; Sam Messam 37'; Liam Higgins 84' | Attendance: 120; Referee: I. Trevis |

| 2:00pm Sunday | Hawke's Bay United | 2–1 | Waitakere United | Bluewater Stadium, Napier |
| | Tom Biss 38'; Tom Mosquera 44' | Report | Richard Cardoza 72' | Attendance: 428; Referee: Nick Waldron |

| 2:00pm Sunday | Team Wellington | 3–3 | Canterbury United | David Farrington Park, Wellington |
| | Charlie Henry 23' (pen.), 32'; Tom Doyle 65' | Report | Russell Kamo 3'; Frederico Marquez 40'; Michael White 77' | Referee: Campbell Kirk Waugh |

| 2:00pm Sunday | Auckland City FC | 2–1 | Wanderers SC | Kiwitea Street, Auckland |
| | Darren White 14'; Emiliano Tade 31' | Report | Andre de Jong 50' | Attendance: 832; Referee: Matt Conger |

==== Round 13 ====
Saturday, 15 February 2014

| 5:00pm Saturday | Waibop United | 1–1 | Waitakere United | John Kerkhof Park, Cambridge |
| | Jack McNab 61' | Report | Richie Cardozo 80' (pen.) | Attendance: 419; Referee: Campbell-Kirk Waugh |

Sunday, 16 February 2014

| 1:00pm Sunday | Southern United | 0–10 | Auckland City FC | Forsyth Barr Stadium, Dunedin |
| | | Report | Emiliano Tade 16', 56'; Joao Moreira 27'; Darren White 67', 82'; Takuya Iwata 71'; Adam Dickinson 72'; Chris Bale 75'; Andrew Milne 79' (pen.); Ryan De Vries 90+2' | Attendance: 150; Referee: John Rowbury |

| 2:00pm Sunday | Canterbury United | 1–2 | Hawke's Bay United | ASB Football Park, Christchurch |
| | Aaron Clapham 70' (pen.) | Report | Tom Biss 31'; Aaron Jones 90' | Attendance: 725; Referee: Matt Conger |

| 3:00pm Sunday | Wanderers SC | 1–4 | Team Wellington | North Harbour Stadium, Auckland |
| | Judd Baker 54' | Report | Henry Fa'arodo 16'; Tom Doyle 74'; Colin Murphy 80'; Sam Mason-Smith 90+5' | Attendance: 200; Referee: Nick Waldron |

==== Round 14 ====
Saturday, 22 February 2014

| 12:30pm Saturday | Waibop United | 0–5 | Team Wellington | John Kerkhof Park, Cambridge |
| | | [ Report] | | Attendance: 332 |

| 5:00pm Saturday | Hawke's Bay United | 1–4 | Auckland City FC | Bluewater Stadium, Napier |
| | | [ Report] |

Sunday, 23 February 2014

| 2:00pm Sunday | Southern United | 5–3 | Wanderers SC | Rugby Park Stadium, Invercargill |
| | | [ Report] |

| 4:00pm Sunday | Waitakere United | 3–1 | Canterbury United | Fred Taylor Park, West Auckland |
| | | [ Report] |

=== Positions by round ===
| Team ╲ Round | 1 | 2 | 3 | 4 | 5 | 6 | 7 | 8 | 9 | 10 | 11 | 6 Catch-Up | 12 | 13 | 14 |
|---|---|---|---|---|---|---|---|---|---|---|---|---|---|---|---|
| Auckland City | 1 | 1 | 2 | 1 | 1 | 2 | 3 | 1 | 1 | | | | 1 | 1 | 1 |
| Canterbury United | 4 | 6 | 6 | 5 | 3 | 5 | 4 | 2 | 2 | 2 | | | 3 | 4 | 5 |
| Hawke's Bay United | 0 | 3 | 3 | 3 | 4 | 3 | 5 | 5 | 4 | | | | | 2 | 3 |
| Southern United | 6 | 7 | 8 | 8 | 8 | 8 | 7 | 7 | 7 | | | | | 7 | 7 |
| Team Wellington | 5 | 8 | 4 | 4 | 6 | 4 | 2 | 4 | 3 | | | | | 3 | 2 |
| Waibop United | 3 | 4 | 5 | 6 | 5 | 6 | 6 | 6 | 6 | | | | | 6 | 6 |
| Waitakere United | 2 | 2 | 1 | 2 | 2 | 1 | 1 | 3 | 5 | | | | | 5 | 4 |
| Wanderers SC | 0 | 5 | 7 | 7 | 7 | 7 | 8 | 8 | 8 | | | | | 8 | 8 |

== Finals ==
=== Semi-finals – first leg ===
Saturday, 1 March 2014

| 2:00 pm Saturday | Waitakere United | 0–4 | Auckland City FC | Fred Taylor Park, West Auckland |

Sunday, 2 March 2014

| 2:00 pm Sunday | Hawke's Bay United | 1–2 | Team Wellington | Bluewater Stadium, Napier |

=== Semi-finals – second leg ===
Saturday, 8 March 2014

| 1:00 pm Saturday | Team Wellington | 1–0 | Hawke's Bay United | David Farrington Park, Wellington |

Sunday, 9 March 2014

| 2:00 pm Sunday | Auckland City FC | 4–1 | Waitakere United | Kiwitea Street, Auckland |

=== Final ===
Sunday, 16 March 2014

| 2:35 pm Sunday | Auckland City FC | 1–0 | Team Wellington | Kiwitea Street, Auckland |
| | Tade 31' | Report | | Attendance: 2232; Referee: Matt Conger |

== Season statistics ==
=== Leading goalscorers ===
Updated to end of Round 13

| Total | Player | | Team | Goals per Round | | | | | | | | | | | | | |
| Total | Player | | Team | 1 | 2 | 3 | 4 | 5 | 6 | 7 | 8 | 9 | 10 | 11 | 12 | 13 | 14 |
|---|---|---|---|---|---|---|---|---|---|---|---|---|---|---|---|---|---|
| 12 | (Argentina) | Emiliano Tade | Auckland City FC | | | | | 1 | | 2 | 2 | 1 | | | 1 | 2 | 3 |
| 8 | (England) | Charlie Henry | Team Wellington | | | 1 | 1 | | 1 | | 1 | | | 2 | 2 | | |
| 8 | (Australia) | Richard Cardozo | Waitakere United | 2 | 1 | | | 1 | | 1 | | | 1 | | 1 | 1 | |
| 8 | (New Zealand) | Aaron Clapham | Canterbury United | | | | 1 | 2 | | 2 | | | 1 | 1 | | 1 | |
| 8 | (Solomon Islands) | Henry Fa'arodo | Team Wellington | | | 2 | | | 1 | 1 | 1 | | 1 | 1 | | 1 | |
| 7 | (New Zealand) | Darren White | Auckland City FC | 1 | | | 1 | | 1 | | | 1 | | | 1 | 2 | |
| 7 | (New Zealand) | Tom Biss | Hawke's Bay United | | | | | 1 | 1 | 1 | | 1 | 1 | | 1 | 1 | |
| 6 | (Ukraine) | Maksim Manko | Waibop United | 1 | 1 | | 1 | | | 1 | | | 1 | 1 | | | |
| 4 | (New Zealand) | Miloš Nikolić | Waibop United | 1 | | | 1 | 2 | | | | | | | | | |
| 4 | (Brazil) | Henrique Alves Viana | Southern United | | | 1 | | 1 | | 1 | 1 | | | | | | |
| 4 | (Scotland) | Jordan Lowdon | Waitakere United | | 1 | 1 | | | | | | 1 | 1 | | | | |
| 4 | (New Zealand) | Dylan Stansfield | Waitakere United | | | 1 | | 1 | | 1 | | | 1 | | | | |
| 4 | (New Zealand) | Hamish Watson | Team Wellington | | | | 1 | | | | | 1 | | 2 | | | |
| 4 | (New Zealand) | Nik Robson | Waibop United | | | | | | | | | | | | 4 | | |
| 4 | (New Zealand) | Tom Mosquera | Hawke's Bay United | | 2 | 1 | | | | | | | | | 1 | | |
| 4 | (New Zealand) | Russell Kamo | Canterbury United | | | | 1 | | | | | 1 | | 1 | 1 | | |
| 4 | (Italy) | Frederico Marquez | Canterbury United | | 1 | | 1 | | | | 1 | | | | 1 | | |
| 4 | (England) | Jack McNab | Waibop United | | | | | | | | | | 1 | 2 | | 1 | |
| 4 | (England) | Aaron Jones | Hawke's Bay United | | | | 1 | | | 1 | | 1 | | | | 1 | |
| 3 | (New Zealand) | Alex Feneridis | Auckland City FC | 1 | | | | 1 | 1 | | | | | | | | |
| 3 | (New Zealand) | Sean Lovemore | Hawke's Bay United | | 1 | | | | | 1 | | | 1 | | | | |
| 3 | (New Zealand) | Joel Stevens | Team Wellington | | | | | | | 1 | | | 1 | 1 | | | |
| 3 | (England) | Adam Dickinson | Auckland City FC | | 1 | | | | | | | | 1 | | | 1 | |
| 2 | (Papua New Guinea) | David Browne | Auckland City FC | 1 | 1 | | | | | | | | | | | | |
| 2 | (New Zealand) | Scott Doney | Wanderers SC | | 1 | | | | 1 | | | | | | | | |
| 2 | (New Zealand) | Elijah Neblett | Wanderers SC | | | | 1 | | 1 | | | | | | | | |
| 2 | (Scotland) | Sam French | Waitakere United | | | | | | 2 | | | | | | | | |
| 2 | (Spain) | Cristóbal Márquez Crespo | Auckland City FC | | | | | | | 2 | | | | | | | |
| 2 | (New Zealand) | Stuart Holthusen | Wanderers SC | | | 1 | | | | | 1 | | | | | | |
| 2 | (New Zealand) | Harley Rodeka | Hawke's Bay United | 1 | | | | | | | | 1 | | | | | |
| 2 | (New Zealand) | Nathaniel Hailemariam | Hawke's Bay United | | | | | | | | | 2 | | | | | |
| 2 | (New Zealand) | Cole Peverley | Team Wellington | | | | | | | 1 | | 1 | | | | | |
| 2 | (England) | Bill Robertson | Hawke's Bay United | | | | | | | | | 1 | 1 | | | | |
| 2 | (Japan) | Masaki Nomoto | Waibop United | | | | 1 | | | | | | | 1 | | | |
| 2 | (United States) | Sean Morris | Hawke's Bay United | | | 1 | | | | | | | | 1 | | | |
| 2 | (New Zealand) | Daniel Morris | Southern United | | 1 | | | | | | | | | | 1 | | |
| 2 | (New Zealand) | Sam Messam | Waibop United | | | | | | | | | | 1 | | 1 | | |
| 2 | (New Zealand) | Michael White | Canterbury United | | | | | | | | | 1 | | | 1 | | |
| 2 | (New Zealand) | Andre De Jong | Wanderers SC | | | | | | | | | | 1 | | 1 | | |
| 2 | (Wales) | Chris Bale | Auckland City FC | | | | 1 | | | | | | | | | 1 | |
| 2 | (South Africa) | Ryan de Vries | Auckland City FC | | | | | | | | 1 | | | | | 1 | |
| 2 | (New Zealand) | Tom Doyle | Team Wellington | | | | | | | | | | | | 1 | 1 | |
| 1 | (England) | Dan Terris | Canterbury United | 1 | | | | | | | | | | | | | |
| 1 | (New Zealand) | Dan Morgan | Waitakere United | 1 | | | | | | | | | | | | | |
| 1 | (Australia) | Jamie de Abreu | Team Wellington | 1 | | | | | | | | | | | | | |
| 1 | (Croatia) | Mario Bilen | Auckland City FC | 1 | | | | | | | | | | | | | |
| 1 | (New Zealand) | Finn Cochrane | Wanderers SC | | 1 | | | | | | | | | | | | |
| 1 | (New Zealand) | Campbell Higgins | Southern United | | 1 | | | | | | | | | | | | |
| 1 | (Fiji) | Roy Krishna | Auckland City FC | | 1 | | | | | | | | | | | | |
| 1 | (New Zealand) | Ian Hogg | Waitakere United | | | 1 | | | | | | | | | | | |
| 1 | (New Zealand) | Jake Butler | Waitakere United | | | 1 | | | | | | | | | | | |
| 1 | (New Zealand) | Ben Thomas | Wanderers SC | | | | 1 | | | | | | | | | | |
| 1 | (New Zealand) | Nick Sugden | Wanderers SC | | | | 1 | | | | | | | | | | |
| 1 | (New Zealand) | Shaydon Young | Waibop United | | | | | 1 | | | | | | | | | |
| 1 | (New Zealand) | Reid Drake | Waibop United | | | | | 1 | | | | | | | | | |
| 1 | (New Zealand) | Matt Joy | Southern United | | | | | 1 | | | | | | | | | |
| 1 | (New Zealand) | Danny Wilson | Hawke's Bay United | | | | | 1 | | | | | | | | | |
| 1 | (New Zealand) | Cameron Lindsay | Team Wellington | | | | | | 1 | | | | | | | | |
| 1 | (New Zealand) | Jarrod Young | Waitakere United | | | | | | 1 | | | | | | | | |
| 1 | (New Zealand) | Sam Burfoot | Auckland City FC | | | | | | 1 | | | | | | | | |
| 1 | (England) | Danny Boys | Canterbury United | | | | | | | 1 | | | | | | | |
| 1 | (New Zealand) | David Mulligan | Hawke's Bay United | | | | | | | 1 | | | | | | | |
| 1 | (New Zealand) | Michael Den Heijer | Wanderers SC | | | | | | | 1 | | | | | | | |
| 1 | (New Zealand) | Andrew Ridden | Southern United | | | | | | | 1 | | | | | | | |
| 1 | (New Zealand) | Cory Chettleburgh | Team Wellington | | | | | | | 1 | | | | | | | |
| 1 | (New Zealand) | Tim Myers) | Waitakere United | | | | | | | | 1 | | | | | | |
| 1 | (New Zealand) | Peter Rae | Southern United | | | | | | | | 1 | | | | | | |
| 1 | (New Zealand) | Logan Wright-Webb | Southern United | | | | | | | | 1 | | | | | | |
| 1 | (New Zealand) | Taylor McCormack | Southern United | | | | | | | | | 1 | | | | | |
| 1 | (Germany) | Jacob Schneider | Southern United | | | | | | | | | | 1 | | | | |
| 1 | (New Zealand) | Regan Coldicott | Southern United | | | | | | | | | | 1 | | | | |
| 1 | (Thailand) | Sansern Limwatthana | Waitakere United | | | | | | | | | | 1 | | | | |
| 1 | (New Zealand) | Adam Mitchell | Wanderers SC | | | | | | | | | | | 1 | | | |
| 1 | (New Zealand) | Liam Higgins | Waibop United | | | | | | | | | | | | 1 | | |
| 1 | (Portugal) | Joao Moreira | Auckland City FC | | | | | | | | | | | | | 1 | |
| 1 | (Japan) | Takuya Iwata | Auckland City FC | | | | | | | | | | | | | 1 | |
| 1 | (New Zealand) | Andrew Milne | Auckland City FC | | | | | | | | | | | | | 1 | |
| 1 | (New Zealand) | Judd Baker | Wanderers SC | | | | | | | | | | | | | 1 | |
| 1 | (New Zealand) | Colin Murphy | Team Wellington | | | | | | | | | | | | | 1 | |
| 1 | (England) | Sam Mason-Smith | Team Wellington | | | | | | | | | | | | | 1 | |

A goal was scored from a penalty kick
Two goals were scored from penalty kicks

=== Own goals ===
Updated to end of Round 7

| Total | Player | | Team | Week(s) |
|---|---|---|---|---|
| 1 | (New Zealand) | Damien Hirst | Wanderers SC (v Canterbury United) | 2 |
| 1 | (New Zealand) | Adam Cowan | Team Wellington (v WaiBOP United) | 7 |

== ASB Premiership Monthly Awards ==
| Month | Most Outstanding Player | | Coach of the Month | |
| Month | Player | Club | Player | Club |
|---|---|---|---|---|
| November 2013 | | | | |
