= Jake Butler =

New Zealand footballer (born 1984)

Personal information
- Full name: Jacob Butler
- Date of birth: 12 November 1984 (age 41)
- Place of birth: New Zealand
- Height: 1.85 m (6 ft 1 in)
- Position: Midfielder

Team information
- Current team: Werribee City FC
- Number: 17

Senior career*
Years	Team	Apps	(Gls)
2002–2006	Bay Olympic	103	(33)
2008–2014	Waitakere United	180	(27)
2012–2019	Waitakere City FC	105	(25)
2014	Tampines Rovers FC	22	(5)
2015–2019	Waitakere United	60	(14)
2018–2019	Werribee City FC	41	(20)
2019–2020	Hamilton Wanderers	9	(3)
2021–2022	Geelong SC	25	(5)
2023	Williamstown Soccer Club	42	(14)
Total		587	(146)

International career^{‡}
2013–2014	New Zealand	3	(0)

Managerial career
- 2015–2017: Waitakere City FC
- 2022: Geelong SC
- * Club domestic league appearances and goals as of 23 November 2020 ‡ National team caps and goals as of 23 January 2014

Jacob Butler (born 12 November 1984) is a New Zealand footballer who currently plays as a midfielder for National Premier Leagues Victoria club Brunswick City. He has also appeared for the New Zealand national football team. Butler was the captain of Waitakere United during its most successful period, winning the New Zealand national competition five times, including leading the team to four consecutive titles after taking over captaincy. Butler has played in seven editions of the OFC Champions League winning it twice, which also led to two appearances at the FIFA Club World Cup. Butler is the leading appearance holder at Waitakere United, having played for the club since its first year of existence in 2004 until he left in 2019.

== Career ==
On 2 June 2014, Butler joined Singaporean S-league team Tampines Rovers in the mid-season transfer window on a six-month contract. He scored his first goal for the club against Warriors FC in the Singapore League Cup. He went on to make 23 appearances scoring 4 goals, playing every minute of every scheduled match.

In January 2015 Butler returned to play for Waitakere United, signing mid-season after his stint in Singapore. Butler helped the team finish fourth after being in seventh place at the Christmas break. He played every minute of the remaining 11 games.

In April 2015 Butler signed a short-term deal with Team Wellington for the OFC Champions League tournament held in Fiji.

Mid season in May 2015, Butler agreed to take over as player–coach of Waitakere City FC who play in the NRFL Premier. This league runs in the winter instead of the summer like the New Zealand Football Championship. During his 2 seasons at the helm, Waitakere city won the league in 2016 and finished fourth respectively in 2017.

Before the start of the start of the 2019–20 season, Butler returned to New Zealand to play in the New Zealand Football Championship for the Hamilton Wanderers.

== International career ==
Butler made his full All Whites debut in a 1–0 win over Saudi Arabia on 4 September 2013.

== Honours ==
- New Zealand Football Championship (5): 2007–08, 2009–10, 2010–11, 2011–12, 2012–13
- OFC Champions League (2): 2007, 2007–08
