= OFC Men's Champions League =

- Organiser(s): OFC
- Founded: 1987; 39 years ago (rebranded in 2007)
- Region: Oceania
- Teams: 8 (group stage); 18 (total)
- Current champions: (New Zealand) Auckland City (14th title)
- Most championships: (New Zealand) Auckland City (14 titles)
- Broadcaster: FIFA+ (live streaming)
- Website: oceaniafootball.com/ofcchampionsleague
- 2026 OFC Men's Champions League

The OFC Men's Champions League is a men's club football competition in Oceania. It is organised by the OFC, Oceania's football governing body. Beginning as the Oceania Club Championship (1987–2006), it has been organised since 2007 under its current format. The first four Club Championship titles were won by Australian clubs. Since 2006, when Australia left the OFC, 16 OFC titles have been won by clubs from New Zealand, one by a Papua New Guinean club and one by a New Caledonian club.

Trophies for OFC tournament winners are made by London-based silversmiths Thomas Lyte. The winning club used to qualify for the FIFA Intercontinental Cup, entering at the African–Asian–Pacific Cup play-off stage. Additionally, the best-ranked champion in a 4-year period, Auckland City FC, qualified for the 2025 edition of the FIFA Club World Cup. Qualifications for those tournaments are now handled by the OFC Professional League.

== History ==
Oceania Club Championship and OFC Champions League winners
Season	Winners
Oceania Club Championship
1987	(Australia) Adelaide City
1988–1998: Not held
1999	(Australia) South Melbourne
2000: Not held
2001	(Australia) Wollongong Wolves
2002–2004: Not held
2005	(Australia) Sydney FC
2006	(New Zealand) Auckland City
OFC Champions League
2007	(New Zealand) Waitakere United
2007–08	(New Zealand) Waitakere United (2)
2008–09	(New Zealand) Auckland City (2)
2009–10	(Papua New Guinea) Hekari United
2010–11	(New Zealand) Auckland City (3)
2011–12	(New Zealand) Auckland City (4)
2012–13	(New Zealand) Auckland City (5)
2013–14	(New Zealand) Auckland City (6)
2014–15	(New Zealand) Auckland City (7)
2016	(New Zealand) Auckland City (8)
2017	(New Zealand) Auckland City (9)
2018	(New Zealand) Team Wellington
2019	(New Caledonia) Hienghène Sport
2020–2021: Cancelled
2022	(New Zealand) Auckland City (10)
2023	(New Zealand) Auckland City (11)
2024	(New Zealand) Auckland City (12)
2025	(New Zealand) Auckland City (13)
2026	(New Zealand) Auckland City (14)

=== Oceania Club Championship ===
The Oceania Club Championship was initially held in one or two venues in a single host nation. The format featured groups playing single round-robin matches, followed by semi-finals and a final, typically lasting around ten days. The inaugural competition in 1987 was played as a single play-off match between the domestic champions of New Zealand and Australia, won by Adelaide City. Following a twelve-year hiatus, the OFC revived the competition as an all-Oceania tournament in January 1999 in Nadi and Lautoka, Fiji. Nine teams participated, with Australian side South Melbourne claiming the title and qualifying for the inaugural 2000 FIFA Club World Championship.

Subsequent editions saw Wollongong Wolves (2001), Sydney FC (2005), and Auckland City (2006) secure titles. Sydney FC did not defend its title in 2006 as Football Federation Australia left the OFC to join the Asian Football Confederation (AFC).

=== OFC Champions League ===
==== 2007–2014 ====
In 2007, the tournament was rebranded as the OFC Champions League. The revised format initially featured two groups, with group winners advancing to a two-legged final played over home and away legs across a seven-month season running from October to April. For the 2012–13 season, a preliminary qualifying stage was introduced for the champions of smaller member associations. The knockout stage was expanded to include semi-finals and a single-leg final at a neutral venue in Auckland, where Auckland City defeated Waitakere United to earn their fifth title. The 2013–14 season saw the group stage centralized in Fiji, while semi-finals and finals returned to a two-legged home-and-away format.

==== 2014–present ====
The tournament was briefly renamed as the Fiji Airways OFC Champions League for the 2014–15 edition. In 2017, the main group stage was expanded to 16 teams hosted across four nations, with group winners advancing to two-legged semi-finals and finals. Quarter-finals were introduced in 2018.

The 2019 final between New Caledonian sides Hienghène Sport and AS Magenta marked the first final without a New Zealand representative since 2005. Following cancellations due to the COVID-19 pandemic in 2020 and 2021, the tournament returned in 2022, with Auckland City FC continuing a dominant run by winning consecutive titles through 2025. In 2024, the tournament was officially renamed the OFC Men's Champions League. Winners of the competition qualify for the annual FIFA Intercontinental Cup, while global representation at the expanded FIFA Club World Cup transitioned to the newly established OFC Professional League.

== Format ==
The OFC Men's Champions League currently features eight teams split into two groups of four. The top two teams from each group advance to the knockout stage, starting with the semi-finals.

== Broadcasting ==
From the 2024 season, all games are live streamed on FIFA+.

== List of finals ==
Key
†	Match was won during extra time
*	Match was won on a penalty shoot-out
&	Finals decided on away goals

- The "Season" column refers to the season the competition was held, and wikilinks to the article about that season.
- The wikilinks in the "Score" column point to the article about that season's final game.

List of Oceania Club Championship and OFC Champions League finals
Season	Country	Winners	Score	Runners-up	Country	Venue	Attendance
Oceania Club Championship
1987	Australia	Adelaide City	1–1* (Note: Score was 1–1 after 90 minutes and extra time. Adelaide City won the penalty shoot-out 4–1.)	Mount Wellington	New Zealand	(Australia) Hindmarsh Stadium, Adelaide	3,500
1999	Australia	South Melbourne	5–1	Nadi	Fiji	(Fiji) Prince Charles Park, Nadi	10,000
2001	Australia	Wollongong Wolves	1–0	Tafea	Vanuatu	(Papua New Guinea) Lloyd Robson Oval, Port Moresby	3,000
2005	Australia	Sydney FC	2–0	AS Magenta	New Caledonia	(French Polynesia) Stade Pater, Papeete	4,000
2006	New Zealand	Auckland City	3–1	AS Pirae	Tahiti	(New Zealand) North Harbour Stadium, Auckland	2,000
OFC Champions League
2007	New Zealand	Waitakere United	1–2	4R Electrical Ba	Fiji	(Fiji) Govind Park, Ba	10,000
2007	New Zealand	Waitakere United	1–0^{&}	4R Electrical Ba	Fiji	(New Zealand) Mount Smart Stadium, Auckland	9,000
2007–08	New Zealand	Waitakere United	1–3	Kossa	Solomon Islands	(Solomon Islands) Lawson Tama Stadium, Honiara	20,000
2007–08	New Zealand	Waitakere United	5–0	Kossa	Solomon Islands	(New Zealand) The Trusts Arena, Auckland	6,000
2008–09	New Zealand	Auckland City	7–2	Koloale	Solomon Islands	(Solomon Islands) Lawson Tama Stadium, Honiara	20,000
2008–09	New Zealand	Auckland City	2–2	Koloale	Solomon Islands	(New Zealand) Kiwitea Street, Auckland	1,250
2009–10	Papua New Guinea	Hekari United	3–0	Waitakere United	New Zealand	(Papua New Guinea) PMRL Stadium, Port Moresby	15,000
2009–10	Papua New Guinea	Hekari United	1–2	Waitakere United	New Zealand	(New Zealand) Fred Taylor Park, Auckland	3,000
2010–11	New Zealand	Auckland City	2–1	Amicale	Vanuatu	(Vanuatu) Port Vila Municipal Stadium, Port Vila	7,925
2010–11	New Zealand	Auckland City	4–0	Amicale	Vanuatu	(New Zealand) Kiwitea Street, Auckland	3,000
2011–12	New Zealand	Auckland City	2–1	Tefana	Tahiti	(New Zealand) Kiwitea Street, Auckland	1,500
2011–12	New Zealand	Auckland City	1–0	Tefana	Tahiti	(French Polynesia) Stade Louis Ganivet, Faʻaʻā	1,900
2012–13	New Zealand	Auckland City	2–1	Waitakere United	New Zealand	(New Zealand) Mount Smart Stadium (Arena 2), Auckland	3,000
2013–14	New Zealand	Auckland City	1–1	Amicale	Vanuatu	(Vanuatu) Port Vila Municipal Stadium, Port Vila	10,000
2013–14	New Zealand	Auckland City	2–1	Amicale	Vanuatu	(New Zealand) Kiwitea Street, Auckland	3,000
2014–15	New Zealand	Auckland City	1–1* (Note: Score was 1–1 after 90 minutes and extra time. Auckland City won the penalty shoot-out 4–3.)	Team Wellington	New Zealand	(Fiji) ANZ Stadium, Suva	3,000
2016	New Zealand	Auckland City	3–0	Team Wellington	New Zealand	(New Zealand) QBE Stadium, Auckland	1,500
2017	New Zealand	Auckland City	3–0	Team Wellington	New Zealand	(New Zealand) David Farrington Park, Wellington	1,000
2017	New Zealand	Auckland City	2–0	Team Wellington	New Zealand	(New Zealand) Kiwitea Street, Auckland	1,000
2018	New Zealand	Team Wellington	6–0	Lautoka	Fiji	(New Zealand) David Farrington Park, Wellington	1,200
2018	New Zealand	Team Wellington	4–3	Lautoka	Fiji	(Fiji) Churchill Park, Lautoka	1,000
2019	New Caledonia	Hienghène Sport	1–0	AS Magenta	New Caledonia	(New Caledonia) Stade Numa-Daly Magenta, Nouméa	7,000
2020	Competition abandoned due to COVID-19 pandemic in Oceania; title not awarded						
2021	No competition due to COVID-19 pandemic in Oceania; title not awarded						
2022	New Zealand	Auckland City	3–0	Vénus	Tahiti	(New Zealand) Ngahue Reserve, Auckland	400
2023	New Zealand	Auckland City	4–2^{†}	Suva	Fiji	(Vanuatu) VFF Freshwater Stadium, Port Vila	5,420
2024	New Zealand	Auckland City	4–0	Pirae	Tahiti	(French Polynesia) Stade Pater, Papeete	819
2025	New Zealand	Auckland City	2–0	Hekari United	Papua New Guinea	(Solomon Islands) National Stadium, Honiara	6,000
2026	New Zealand	Auckland City	2–0	Central Coast	Solomon Islands	(Fiji) Govind Park, Ba	

== Records and statistics ==
=== Performance by club ===
Performance in the OFC Club Championship and OFC Champions League by club
Club	Titles	Runners-up	Years won	Years runner-up
(New Zealand) Auckland City	14	—	2006, 2009, 2011, 2012, 2013, 2014, 2015, 2016, 2017, 2022, 2023, 2024, 2025, 2026	—
(New Zealand) Waitakere United	2	2	2007, 2008	2010, 2013
(New Zealand) Team Wellington	1	3	2018	2015, 2016, 2017
(Papua New Guinea) Hekari United	1	1	2010	2025
(Australia) Adelaide City	1	—	1987	—
(Australia) South Melbourne	1	—	1999	—
(Australia) Wollongong Wolves	1	—	2001	—
(Australia) Sydney FC	1	—	2005	—
(New Caledonia) Hienghène Sport	1	—	2019	—
(French Polynesia) Pirae	—	2	—	2006, 2024
(New Caledonia) Magenta	—	2	—	2005, 2019
(Vanuatu) Amicale	—	2	—	2011, 2014
(New Zealand) Uni-Mount Bohemian	—	1	—	1987
(Fiji) Nadi	—	1	—	1999
(Vanuatu) Tafea	—	1	—	2001
(Fiji) Ba	—	1	—	2007
(Solomon Islands) Kossa	—	1	—	2008
(Solomon Islands) Koloale	—	1	—	2009
(French Polynesia) Tefana	—	1	—	2012
(Fiji) Lautoka	—	1	—	2018
(French Polynesia) Vénus	—	1	—	2022
(Fiji) Suva	—	1	—	2023
(Solomon Islands) Central Coast	—	1	—	2026

=== Performance by nation ===
Nation	Winners	Runners-up	Winning clubs	Runner-up clubs
New Zealand	17	6	Auckland City (14); Waitakere United (2); Team Wellington (1)	Waitakere United (2); Team Wellington (3); Uni-Mount Bohemian (1)
Australia (Note: Football Federation Australia were founder members of the Oceania Football Confederation (OFC) before joining the Asian Football Confederation in 2006.)	4	0	Adelaide City (1); South Melbourne (1); Wollongong Wolves (1); Sydney FC (1)	—N/a
New Caledonia	1	2	Hienghène Sport (1)	AS Magenta (2)
Papua New Guinea	1	1	Hekari United (1)	Hekari United (1)
Fiji	0	4	—N/a	Nadi (1); Ba (1); Lautoka (1); Suva (1)
Tahiti	0	4	—N/a	AS Pirae (2); AS Tefana (1); AS Vénus (1)
Solomon Islands	0	3	—N/a	Kossa (1); Koloale (1); Central Coast (1)
Vanuatu	0	3	—N/a	Amicale (2); Tafea (1)

Performances in finals by nation
Nation	Titles	Runners-up	Total
New Zealand	17	6	23
Australia	4	0	4
New Caledonia	1	2	3
Papua New Guinea	1	1	2
Fiji	0	4	4
Tahiti	0	4	4
Solomon Islands	0	3	3
Vanuatu	0	3	3

=== All-time top 10 OFC Champions League rankings ===
As of 12 April 2025

Best Finish	Winner	Runners-up	Semi-finals	Quarter-finals

Pos	Team	Pld	W	D	L	GF	GA	GD	Pts
1	(New Zealand) Auckland City (20)	115	85	21	9	333	82	+251	276
2	(New Zealand) Waitakere United (8)	49	26	12	11	99	47	+52	90
3	(Papua New Guinea) Hekari United (13)	58	26	11	21	103	76	+27	89
4	(New Caledonia) Magenta (11)	50	25	10	15	110	63	+47	85
5	(Fiji) Ba (13)	55	24	7	24	79	90	−11	79
6	(Vanuatu) Tafea (9)	38	18	8	12	97	64	+33	62
7	(New Zealand) Team Wellington (5)	27	19	4	4	94	26	+68	61
8	(French Polynesia) AS Pirae (8)	35	17	6	12	85	58	+27	57
9	(Cook Islands) Tupapa Maraerenga (10)	38	17	4	17	110	116	−6	55
10	(Vanuatu) Amicale (6)	35	16	5	14	50	40	+10	53

Rank	Club	Years	Pld	W	D	L	GF	GA	GD	Pts	W	RU	SF	QF	16	GS
1	(New Zealand) Auckland City	20	112	83	20	9	326	81	+245	321	13		2			4

* Number in parentheses show number of participations. In italic, defunct teams.

=== All-time table by leagues ===
- As of 9 November 2022. All matches including qualifying were taken into account with a game decided by penalties counted as draw. No awarded/withdrawn games were counted.

#	League	Teams Apps	Pld	W	D	L	GF	GA	GD	Pts	W	RU	SF	QF	16	GS
1	New Zealand National League	40	193	128	37	28	557	165	+392	421	16	6	6			8

Pos	Team	Pld	W	D	L	GF	GA	GD	Pts
1	New Zealand	193	128	37	28	557	165	+392	421
2	Fiji	119	47	16	56	187	242	−55	157
3	Vanuatu	109	44	22	43	205	188	+17	154
4	New Caledonia	97	38	16	43	178	187	−9	130
5	Tahiti	108	38	15	55	224	221	+3	129
6	Solomon Islands	102	36	18	48	203	225	−22	126
7	Papua New Guinea	89	28	14	47	143	239	−96	98
8	Samoa	54	19	4	31	112	176	−64	61
9	Cook Islands	44	16	5	23	99	128	−29	53
10	Australia (Note: Football Federation Australia were founder members of the Oceania Football Confederation (OFC) before joining the Asian Football Confederation in 2006.)	17	16	1	0	90	9	+81	49
11	Tonga	34	6	5	23	46	153	−107	23
12	American Samoa	22	1	2	19	25	128	−103	5
13	Palau (Note: Palau is not OFC member.)	1	0	0	1	2	6	−4	0

== See also ==
- OFC Professional League
- Oceania Cup Winners' Cup
- OFC Women's Champions League
