= Chris Bale =

Welsh footballer (born 1982)

Personal information
- Date of birth: 30 May 1982 (age 44)
- Place of birth: Wales
- Position: Midfielder

Senior career*
Years	Team	Apps	(Gls)
- Merthyr Tydfil
2007–2009	Waitakere United		
2009–2010	Team Wellington	13	(1)
2010–2012	Waitakere United	31	(5)
2012–2014	Auckland City	28	(9)
2014–2015	Waitakere United	14	(1)
2015–2016	Team Wellington	15	(3)
2017	Waitakere United	7	(0)
- * Club domestic league appearances and goals

Christopher Bale (born 30 May 1982) is a Welsh former footballer who played as a midfielder.

== Personal life ==
Bale was born in 1982 in Wales. He has worked as a territory manager.

== Career ==
In 2012, Bale signed for New Zealand side Auckland City. He was described as "ever-present for the Navy Blues".

== Style of play ==
Bale mainly operated as a midfielder. He was described as "more about box-to-box action".
