= Tim Myers (footballer) =

New Zealand footballer (born 1990)

Personal information
- Full name: Timothy Esmonde Myers
- Date of birth: 17 September 1990 (age 36)
- Place of birth: Auckland, New Zealand
- Height: 1.84 m (6 ft 0 in)
- Position: Centre-back

Senior career*
| Years | Team | Apps | (Gls) |
| 2007–2014 | Waitakere United | 90 | (6) |
| 2014–2015 | Team Wellington FC | 75 | (5) |
| 2015–2019 | Three Kings United | | |

International career
| 2007 | New Zealand U17 | 2 | (0) |
| 2008 | New Zealand U20 | 3 | (0) |
| 2012 | New Zealand U23 | 4 | (0) |
| 2012 | New Zealand | 3 | (0) |
- * Club domestic league appearances and goals

Timothy Esmonde Myers (born 17 September 1990) is a New Zealand former professional footballer who played as a centre-back. He made three appearances for the New Zealand national team in 2012.

== Club career ==
Myers began playing for Eastern Suburbs in Auckland as a five-year-old. He moved to Waitakere United as a teenager. In 2005, at the age of 14, Myers was captain of the New Zealand team at the Manchester United Premier Cup tournament in Hong Kong.

== International career ==
Myers represented New Zealand at 2007 FIFA U-17 World Cup playing the first two matches. He also played for the New Zealand Under-20 team at the 2008 OFC U-20 Championship as the Kiwis finished third place. In 2012, Myers was called up to the Under-23 team, winning the OFC U-23 Championship and qualifying to 2012 Olympic Football Tournament, where he played in one of New Zealand's games. He missed two of the three warmup games due to an injury.

Myers was called to 2012 OFC Nations Cup and had his debut coming off the bench against Papua New Guinea, appearing in two other matches of the tournament.

== Career statistics ==
New Zealand national team
| Year | Apps | Goals |
|---|---|---|
| 2012 | 3 | 0 |
| Total | 3 | 0 |

New Zealand's goal tally first.

International appearances and goals
| # | Date | Venue | Opponent | Result | Competition | Goal | Match Report |
|---|---|---|---|---|---|---|---|
2012
| 1 | 4 June | Lawson Tama Stadium, Honiara | Papua New Guinea | 2–1 | 2012 OFC Nations Cup | | NZ Football |
| 2 | 6 June | Lawson Tama Stadium, Honiara | Solomon Islands | 1–1 | 2012 OFC Nations Cup | | NZ Football |
| 3 | 10 June | Lawson Tama Stadium, Honiara | Solomon Islands | 4–3 | 2012 OFC Nations Cup | | NZ Football |
