= Fred Taylor Park =

Home stadium to Waitakere United

Coordinates: 36.8001°S 174.5957°E

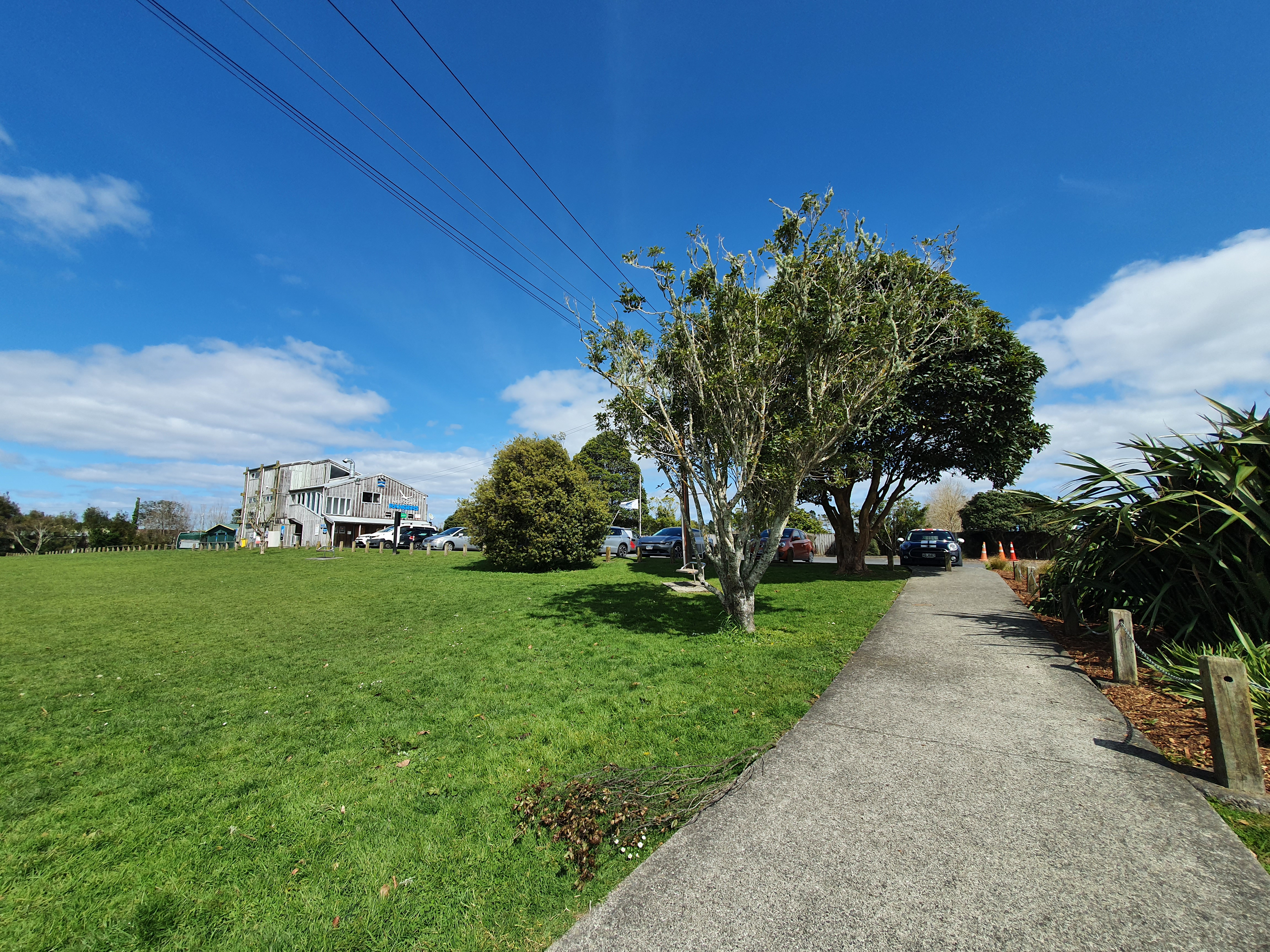
- Interactive map of Fred Taylor Park
- Location: 184 Fred Taylor Drive, Whenuapai, Auckland, New Zealand
- Owner: City of Auckland
- Operator: City of Auckland
- Capacity: 1,000
- Surface: Grass Pitch

Tenants
- Waitakere City (–2020); Waitakere United (2004–2021); West Coast Rangers (2021–present); Auckland FC Reserves (2025–present)

Fred Taylor Park is an association football ground based in Whenuapai, Auckland. It is currently the home ground of West Coast Rangers and Auckland FC Reserves. It was also the home to Waitakere City F.C. and Waitakere United before those clubs dissolved in 2020 and 2021 respectively.

== History ==
In September 2022, FIFA announced that Fred Taylor Park was shortlisted to be a team base camp for the 2023 FIFA Women's World Cup. On 12 December 2022, Fred Taylor Park was announced as the training ground for Vietnam during the world cup.
