= 2012 OFC Champions League final =

- Event: 2011–12 OFC Champions League
Auckland City	Tefana
(New Zealand)	(French Polynesia)
3	1
- on aggregate

First leg
Auckland City	Tefana
2	1
- Date: 29 April 2012
- Venue: Kiwitea Street, Auckland
- Referee: John Saohu (Solomon Islands)
- Attendance: 1,500

Second leg
Tefana	Auckland City
0	1
- Date: 12 May 2012
- Venue: Stade Louis Ganivet, Faaa
- Referee: Isidore Assiene-Ambassa (New Caledonia)
- Attendance: 1,900

The 2012 OFC Champions League final was the final of the 2011–12 OFC Champions League, the 11th season of the Oceania Cup, Oceania's premier club football tournament organized by the Oceania Football Confederation (OFC), and the 6th season under the current name of the OFC Champions League (also known as O-League).

The final was played over two legs between Tefana from Tahiti and Auckland City from New Zealand, on 29 April and 12 May 2012. After winning the first leg 2–1, Auckland City also won the second leg 1–0 to complete a 3–1 aggregate win. As the OFC Champions League winners, they qualified for the 2012 FIFA Club World Cup as the OFC representative, entering the qualifying play-off round.

== Background ==
Auckland City were the defending champions, winning the title in 2010–11 after beating Amicale in the 2011 OFC Champions League Final. They also won two other finals in 2009 and 2006.

Tefana finished fourth in the group stage in the previous season. They became the second Tahitian side to reach an Oceanian club final, after Pirae in 2006 where they lost to Auckland City.

== Road to final ==
(French Polynesia) Tefana		Round	(New Zealand) Auckland City	
Opponent	Result	Group stage	Opponent	Result
(New Zealand) Waitakere United	0–10 (A)	Matchday 1	(Solomon Islands) Koloale	4–1 (A)
(New Caledonia) Mont-Dore	1–1 (A)	Matchday 2	(Papua New Guinea) Hekari United	2–0 (H)
(Fiji) Ba	4–1 (H)	Matchday 3	(Vanuatu) Amicale	3–2 (H)
(New Zealand) Waitakere United	3–0 (H)	Matchday 4	(Solomon Islands) Koloale	7–3 (H)
(New Caledonia) Mont-Dore	2–0 (H)	Matchday 5	(Papua New Guinea) Hekari United	1–1 (A)
(Fiji) Ba	5–0 (A)	Matchday 6	(Vanuatu) Amicale	0–1 (A)
Group A winner: Team / Pld / W / D / L / GF / GA / GD / Pts; (French Polynesia) Tefana / 6 / 4 / 1 / 1 / 15 / 12 / +3 / 13; (New Zealand) Waitakere United / 6 / 4 / 0 / 2 / 21 / 6 / +15 / 12; (Fiji) Ba / 6 / 3 / 0 / 3 / 7 / 16 / −9 / 9; (New Caledonia) Mont-Dore / 6 / 0 / 1 / 5 / 2 / 11 / −9 / 1		Final standings	Group B winner: Team / Pld / W / D / L / GF / GA / GD / Pts; (New Zealand) Auckland City / 6 / 4 / 1 / 1 / 17 / 8 / +9 / 13; (Papua New Guinea) Hekari United / 6 / 3 / 2 / 1 / 9 / 6 / +3 / 11; (Vanuatu) Amicale / 6 / 2 / 1 / 3 / 6 / 7 / −1 / 7; (Solomon Islands) Koloale / 6 / 1 / 0 / 5 / 7 / 18 / −11 / 3	

== Rules ==
The winners of the two groups played in the final over two legs, with the order of matches decided by a random draw. The away goals rule applied, with extra time and a penalty shootout used to decide the winner if necessary.

== Match summary ==
=== First leg ===
29 April 2012
14:00 UTC+12:00

Auckland City (New Zealand)	2 – 1	(French Polynesia) Tefana
Mulligan 57'; Koprivcic 60'	Report	Williams 72'

Kiwitea Street, Auckland
Attendance: 1,500
Referee: John Saohu (Solomon Islands)

Auckland City	Tefana

AUCKLAND CITY:
GK	1	(New Zealand) Jacob Spoonley
DF	3	(New Zealand) Ian Hogg	(yellow card) 62'
DF	5	(Spain) Ángel Berlanga
DF	7	(New Zealand) James Pritchett
MF	8	(New Zealand) Dave Mulligan		(substituted off) 65'
FW	9	(Spain) Manel Expósito
FW	11	(New Zealand) Daniel Koprivcic
MF	13	(New Zealand) Alex Feneridis	(yellow card) 60'
FW	14	(England) Adam Dickinson		(substituted off) 80'
DF	15	(New Zealand) Ivan Vicelich (c)
MF	16	(Spain) Albert Riera
Substitutes:
GK	12	(New Zealand) Tamati Williams
DF	4	(New Zealand) Riki van Steeden
MF	6	(New Zealand) Chad Coombes	(yellow card) 82'	(substituted on) 80'
FW	10	(Costa Rica) Luis Corrales		(substituted on) 65'
MF	17	(New Zealand) Adam McGeorge
FW	22	(New Zealand) Andrew Milne
DF	23	(New Zealand) Simon Arms
Manager:
(Spain) Ramon Tribulietx

TEFANA:
GK	23	(French Polynesia) Xavier Samin
DF	2	(French Polynesia) Stephane Faatiarau
DF	3	(French Polynesia) Pierre Kugogne	(yellow card) 79'
MF	6	(French Polynesia) Heimano Bourebare
FW	7	(French Polynesia) Taufa Neuffer	(yellow card) 21'	(substituted off) 86'
MF	8	(French Polynesia) Tetiamana Marmouyet (c)	(yellow card) 31'
DF	11	(French Polynesia) Jean-Claude Chang Koei Chang
MF	13	(French Polynesia) Stanley Atani	(yellow card) 55'
MF	15	(French Polynesia) Lorenzo Tehau		(substituted off) 67'
FW	19	(French Polynesia) Alvin Tehau
DF	21	(French Polynesia) Angelo Tchen	(yellow card) 23'	(substituted off) 81'
Substitutes:
GK	25	(French Polynesia) Leonce Roometua
DF	4	(French Polynesia) Luthy Bohl
DF	5	(French Polynesia) Mihimana Lemaire
FW	17	(French Polynesia) Roihau Degage		(substituted on) 86'
DF	18	(French Polynesia) Tauraa Marmouyet		(substituted on) 81'
FW	20	(French Polynesia) Axel Williams		(substituted on) 67'
FW	24	(French Polynesia) David Chang Koei Chang
Manager:
(French Polynesia) Laurent Heinis

Assistant referees:
Jackson Namo (Solomon Islands)
Ravinesh Kumar (Fiji)
Fourth official:
Rakesh Varman (Fiji)

=== Second leg ===
12 May 2012
16:00 UTC−10:00

Tefana (French Polynesia)	0 – 1	(New Zealand) Auckland City
	Report	Expósito 41'

Stade Louis Ganivet, Faaa
Attendance: 1,900
Referee: Isidore Assiene-Ambassa (New Caledonia)

Tefana	Auckland City

TEFANA:
GK	23	(French Polynesia) Xavier Samin
DF	3	(French Polynesia) Pierre Kugogne
MF	6	(French Polynesia) Heimano Bourebare	(yellow card) 40'
FW	7	(French Polynesia) Taufa Neuffer		(substituted off) 72'
MF	8	(French Polynesia) Tetiamana Marmouyet (c)
DF	11	(French Polynesia) Jean-Claude Chang Koei Chang
MF	16	(French Polynesia) Sebastian Labayen	(yellow card) 25'	(substituted off) 77'
DF	18	(French Polynesia) Tauraa Marmouyet
FW	19	(French Polynesia) Alvin Tehau	(yellow card) 63'
FW	20	(French Polynesia) Axel Williams		(substituted off) 56'
DF	21	(French Polynesia) Angelo Tchen
Substitutes:
GK	25	(French Polynesia) Leonce Roometua
DF	2	(French Polynesia) Stephane Faatiarau
MF	10	(French Polynesia) Hiva Kamoise		(substituted on) 77'
DF	12	(French Polynesia) Viritua Tiaiho
MF	13	(French Polynesia) Stanley Atani		(substituted on) 72'
MF	15	(French Polynesia) Lorenzo Tehau		(substituted on) 56'
FW	17	(French Polynesia) Roihau Degage
Manager:
(French Polynesia) Laurent Heinis

AUCKLAND CITY:
GK	1	(New Zealand) Jacob Spoonley	(yellow card) 90'
DF	3	(New Zealand) Ian Hogg
DF	5	(Spain) Ángel Berlanga
DF	7	(New Zealand) James Pritchett
FW	9	(Spain) Manel Expósito		(substituted off) 90+1'
FW	11	(New Zealand) Daniel Koprivcic		(substituted off) 51'
MF	13	(New Zealand) Alex Feneridis	(red card) 69'
FW	14	(England) Adam Dickinson	(yellow card) 39'
DF	15	(New Zealand) Ivan Vicelich (c)
MF	16	(Spain) Albert Riera
MF	21	(Spain) Ivan Diaz	(yellow card) 65'	(substituted off) 73'
Substitutes:
GK	12	(New Zealand) Tamati Williams
MF	6	(New Zealand) Chad Coombes		(substituted on) 51'
MF	8	(New Zealand) Dave Mulligan
FW	10	(Costa Rica) Luis Corrales
MF	17	(New Zealand) Adam McGeorge		(substituted on) 73'
FW	20	(Argentina) Emiliano Tade
FW	22	(New Zealand) Andrew Milne		(substituted on) 90+1'
Manager:
(Spain) Ramon Tribulietx

Assistant referees:
Michael Joseph (Vanuatu)
Didier Hmuso (New Caledonia)
Fourth official:
Bruce George (Vanuatu)
