= 2011–12 OFC Champions League =

Tournament details
- Dates: 29 October 2011 – 12 May 2012
- Teams: 8 (from 7 associations)

Final positions
- Champions: (New Zealand) Auckland City (4th title)
- Runners-up: (French Polynesia) Tefana

Tournament statistics
- Matches played: 26
- Goals scored: 88 (3.38 per match)
- Top scorer: (Spain) Manel Expósito (6 goals)
- Best player: (Spain) Albert Riera
- Best goalkeeper: (New Zealand) Jacob Spoonley

The 2011–12 OFC Champions League, also known as the 2012 O-League, was the 11th edition of the Oceanian Club Championship, Oceania's premier club football tournament organized by the Oceania Football Confederation (OFC), and the 6th season under the current OFC Champions League name. It was contested by eight teams from seven countries. The teams were split into two four-team pools, the winner of each pool contesting the title of O-League Champion and the right to represent the OFC at the 2012 FIFA Club World Cup.

The title was won by the defending champions Auckland City.

== Participants ==
Location of teams of the 2011–12 OFC Champions League.

From the 2011–12 season, the two New Zealand clubs were placed in different groups (in previous tournaments they were placed in the same group) – one was drawn with the club champions of Fiji, New Caledonia and Tahiti while the other competed in the second group with the champions of Vanuatu, Solomon Islands and Papua New Guinea.

Again no preliminary tournament for the 2011–12 O-League was played. Instead, the champion teams from American Samoa, Samoa, Cook Islands and Tonga would take part in a pilot stand-alone tournament in 2012. It was proposed that this competition would in future seasons became a preliminary tournament with the winner qualifying to play off for a place in the O-League (starting from 2012–13).

Association	Team	Qualifying method
Fiji	Ba	2010 Fiji National Football League champion
New Caledonia	Mont-Dore	2010 New Caledonia Division Honneur champion
New Zealand	Waitakere United	2010–11 New Zealand Football Championship champion and premier
New Zealand	Auckland City	2010–11 New Zealand Football Championship regular season runner-up
Papua New Guinea	Hekari United	2010–11 Papua New Guinea National Soccer League champion
Solomon Islands	Koloale	2011 Solomon Islands Champions League Playoff winner
(French Polynesia) Tahiti	Tefana	2010–11 Tahiti Division Fédérale champion
Vanuatu	Amicale	2011 Vanuatu National Soccer League winner

== Schedule ==
The match schedule was as follows.

Round		Date
Group stage	Matchday 1	29–30 October 2011
Group stage	Matchday 2	19–20 November 2011
Group stage	Matchday 3	3–4 December 2011
Group stage	Matchday 4	18–19 February 2012
Group stage	Matchday 5	3–4 March 2012
Group stage	Matchday 6	31 March–1 April 2012
Final	First leg	28–29 April 2012
Final	Second leg	12–13 May 2012

== Group stage ==
Based on seeding, sporting reasons and travel considerations, the OFC Executive Committee separated the teams into two groups in June 2011. A draw was held at the OFC Headquarters in Auckland, New Zealand on 19 July 2011, 14:30 UTC+12:00, to decide the "position" of each team within those groups, which was used to determine the schedule.

In each group, the teams played each other home-and-away in a round-robin format, with the group winner advancing to the final. If two or more teams were tied on points, the tiebreakers would be as follows:

1. Goal difference
2. Goals scored
3. Head-to-head record among teams concerned (points; goal difference; goals scored)
4. Fair play record
5. Drawing of lots

=== Group A ===
Team	Pld	W	D	L	GF	GA	GD	Pts	TEF	WAI	BA	MON
(French Polynesia) Tefana	6	4	1	1	15	12	+3	13		3–0	4–1	2–0
(New Zealand) Waitakere United	6	4	0	2	21	6	+15	12	10–0		4–0	4–0
(Fiji) Ba	6	3	0	3	7	16	−9	9	0–5	3–2		2–1
(New Caledonia) Mont-Dore	6	0	1	5	2	11	−9	1	1–1	0–1	0–1	

29 October 2011
14:00 UTC+13:00

Waitakere United (New Zealand)	10 – 0	(French Polynesia) Tefana
Pearce 10' (pen.), 44'; De Vries 14', 37', 75'; Krishna 33', 40', 49', 70', 90'	Report

Fred Taylor Park, Auckland
Attendance: 900
Referee: Rakesh Varman (Fiji)
30 October 2011
15:00 UTC+13:00

Ba (Fiji)	2 – 1	(New Caledonia) Mont-Dore
Swamy 64', 82'	Report	J. Hmaé 33'

Govind Park, Ba
Attendance: 1,500
Referee: Chris Kerr (New Zealand)

12 November 2011^{1}
15:00 UTC+11:00

Mont-Dore (New Caledonia)	1 – 1	(French Polynesia) Tefana
M. Hmaé 70'	Report	Kamoise 80'

Stade Numa-Daly Magenta, Nouméa
Attendance: 300
Referee: Jamie Cross (New Zealand)
20 November 2011
15:00 UTC+13:00

Waitakere United (New Zealand)	4 – 0	(Fiji) Ba
Vesikula 56' (o.g.); McKenzie 60'; Bale 71'; Lovemore 90+3'	Report

Fred Taylor Park, Auckland
Attendance: 4,000
Referee: Norbert Hauata (Tahiti)

3 December 2011
15:00 UTC+11:00

Mont-Dore (New Caledonia)	0 – 1	(New Zealand) Waitakere United
	Report	Bale 40'

Stade Numa-Daly Magenta, Nouméa
Attendance: 400
Referee: Averii Jacques (Tahiti)
2 December 2011
19:30 UTC−10:00

Tefana (French Polynesia)	4 – 1	(Fiji) Ba
Marmouyet 21' (pen.); Degage 38', 77'; Williams 85'	Report	Vesikula 59' (pen.)

Stade Louis Ganivet, Faaa
Attendance: 117
Referee: Nick Waldron (New Zealand)

18 February 2012
15:00 UTC+11:00

Mont-Dore (New Caledonia)	0 – 1	(Fiji) Ba
	Report	Vakatalesau 36' (pen.)

Stade Numa-Daly Magenta, Nouméa
Attendance: 100
Referee: Peter O'Leary (New Zealand)
17 February 2012
19:30 UTC−10:00

Tefana (French Polynesia)	3 – 0	(New Zealand) Waitakere United
Tehau 1'; Labayen 43'; Neuffer 70'	Report

Stade Louis Ganivet, Faaa
Attendance: 193
Referee: Isidore Assiene-Ambassa (New Caledonia)

2 March 2012
19:30 UTC−10:00

Tefana (French Polynesia)	2 – 0	(New Caledonia) Mont-Dore
Degage 47'; Chang Koei Chang 71' (pen.)	Report

Stade Louis Ganivet, Faaa
Attendance: 248
Referee: Andrew Achari (Fiji)
4 March 2012
15:00 UTC+12:00

Ba (Fiji)	3 – 2	(New Zealand) Waitakere United
Tekiate 36'; Salauneune 51'; Kainihewe 73'	Report	Cunneen 31'; Lovemore 83'

Govind Park, Ba
Attendance: ?
Referee: Norbert Hauata (Tahiti)

31 March 2012
15:00 UTC+13:00

Waitakere United (New Zealand)	4 – 0	(New Caledonia) Mont-Dore
McKenzie 68'; Haviland 73'; Pearce 82'; Lovermore 87'	Report

Fred Taylor Park, Auckland
Attendance: 150
Referee: Kader Zitouni (Tahiti)
15 April 2012^{2}
16:30 UTC+12:00

Ba (Fiji)	0 – 5	(French Polynesia) Tefana
	Report	Tchen 36', 42'; Neuffer 53'; Tehau 74'; Williams 86'

Bill McKinlay Park, Auckland (New Zealand)^{2}
Referee: Gerald Oiaka (Solomon Islands)

Notes

- Note 1: Rescheduled due to Tefana's involvement in the 2011–12 Coupe de France.
- Note 2: Originally scheduled to be played on 31 March 2012 at Govind Park, Ba, but postponed to 1 April 2012 and moved to Churchill Park, Lautoka, due to a severe storm that caused massive disruption across Fiji and left Govind Park in an unsuitable state to host the fixture. Due to further deterioration in the weather situation and outlook, it was decided to postpone the match to a later date. With Fiji still recovering from the flooding, it was proposed that the match would take place in Auckland.

=== Group B ===
Team	Pld	W	D	L	GF	GA	GD	Pts	AUC	HEK	AMI	KOL
(New Zealand) Auckland City	6	4	1	1	17	8	+9	13		2–0	3–2	7–3
(Papua New Guinea) Hekari United	6	3	2	1	9	6	+3	11	1–1		2–0	3–1
(Vanuatu) Amicale	6	2	1	3	6	7	−1	7	1–0	1–1		2–0
(Solomon Islands) Koloale	6	1	0	5	7	18	−11	3	1–4	1–2	1–0	

29 October 2011
15:00 UTC+11:00

Amicale (Vanuatu)	1 – 1	(Papua New Guinea) Hekari United
Masauvakalo 45'	Report	Jack 90+3'

Port Vila Municipal Stadium, Port Vila
Attendance: 6,500
Referee: Peter O'Leary (New Zealand)
29 October 2011
15:00 UTC+11:00

Koloale (Solomon Islands)	1 – 4	(New Zealand) Auckland City
Totori 74' (pen.)	Report	Expósito 22' (pen.), 54'; Mulligan 86', 90+3'

Lawson Tama Stadium, Honiara
Attendance: 18,000
Referee: Andrew Achari (Fiji)

19 November 2011
14:00 UTC+13:00

Auckland City (New Zealand)	2 – 0	(Papua New Guinea) Hekari United
Expósito 49'; Tade 72'	Report

Kiwitea Street, Auckland
Attendance: 800
Referee: Rakesh Varman (Fiji)
19 November 2011
15:00 UTC+11:00

Amicale (Vanuatu)	2 – 0	(Solomon Islands) Koloale
Waroi 3', 53'	Report

Port Vila Municipal Stadium, Port Vila
Attendance: 6,000
Referee: Nick Waldron (New Zealand)

10 December 2011^{3}
15:00 UTC+10:00

Hekari United (Papua New Guinea)	3 – 1	(Solomon Islands) Koloale
Waqa 6'; Lepani 16'; Baleitoga 79'	Report	Naka 82'

PMRL Stadium, Port Moresby
Attendance: ?
Referee: Andrew Achari (Fiji)
18 January 2012^{4}
17:45 UTC+13:00

Auckland City (New Zealand)	3 – 2	(Vanuatu) Amicale
Expósito 40' (pen.), 45+1'; Dickinson 87'	Report	Pritchett 23' (o.g.); Maemae 76'

Kiwitea Street, Auckland
Attendance: 800
Referee: Kader Zitouni (Tahiti)

18 February 2012
15:00 UTC+13:00

Auckland City (New Zealand)	7 – 3	(Solomon Islands) Koloale
Dickinson 7', 59'; Coombes 36'; Lafai 40' (o.g.); Vicelich 58'; Milne 62'; Koprivcic 83'	Report	Anisi 16'; Totori 65'; Naka 90+3'

Kiwitea Street, Auckland
Attendance: 850
Referee: Averii Jacques (Tahiti)
18 February 2012
15:00 UTC+10:00

Hekari United (Papua New Guinea)	2 – 0	(Vanuatu) Amicale
Jack 11', 79'	Report

PMRL Stadium, Port Moresby
Attendance: 5,000
Referee: Chris Kerr (New Zealand)

3 March 2012
15:00 UTC+11:00

Koloale (Solomon Islands)	1 – 0	(Vanuatu) Amicale
Sale 87'	Report

Lawson Tama Stadium, Honiara
Attendance: ?
Referee: Nick Waldron (New Zealand)
3 March 2012
15:00 UTC+10:00

Hekari United (Papua New Guinea)	1 – 1	(New Zealand) Auckland City
Dunadamu 60'	Report	Feneridis 90+1'

PMRL Stadium, Port Moresby
Attendance: ?
Referee: Gerald Oiaka (Solomon Islands)

31 March 2012
15:00 UTC+11:00

Amicale (Vanuatu)	1 – 0	(New Zealand) Auckland City
Tangis 60'	Report

Port Vila Municipal Stadium, Port Vila
Attendance: 5,000
Referee: Bruce George (Vanuatu)
31 March 2012
15:00 UTC+11:00

Koloale (Solomon Islands)	1 – 2	(Papua New Guinea) Hekari United
Totori 16' (pen.)	Report	Dunadamu 45'; Jack 75'

Lawson Tama Stadium, Honiara
Attendance: 5,000
Referee: Nick Waldron (New Zealand)

Notes

- Note 3: Postponed from 3 December 2011 due to ground availability issues.
- Note 4: Rescheduled due to Auckland City's involvement in the 2011 FIFA Club World Cup.

== Final ==
The winners of the two groups played in the final over two legs, with the order of matches decided by a random draw. The away goals rule applied, with extra time and a penalty shootout used to decide the winner if necessary.

Team 1	Agg.	Team 2	1st leg	2nd leg
Auckland City (New Zealand)	3–1	(French Polynesia) Tefana	2–1	1–0

29 April 2012
14:00 UTC+12:00

Auckland City (New Zealand)	2 – 1	(French Polynesia) Tefana
Mulligan 57'; Koprivcic 60'	Report	Williams 72'

Kiwitea Street, Auckland
Attendance: 1,500
Referee: John Saohu (Solomon Islands)

12 May 2012
16:00 UTC−10:00

Tefana (French Polynesia)	0 – 1	(New Zealand) Auckland City
	Report	Expósito 41'

Stade Louis Ganivet, Faaa
Attendance: 1,900
Referee: Isidore Assiene-Ambassa (New Caledonia)

Auckland City won 3–1 on aggregate. As OFC Champions League winners they qualified for the qualifying round of the 2012 FIFA Club World Cup.

OFC Champions League
2011–12 Winners
(New Zealand)
Auckland City
Fourth title

== Awards ==
The following awards were given:

- Golden Ball (best player): (Spain) Albert Riera (Auckland City)
- Golden Boot (top scorer): (Spain) Manel Expósito (Auckland City)
- Golden Gloves (best goalkeeper): (New Zealand) Jacob Spoonley (Auckland City)
- Fair Play Award: (Solomon Islands) Koloale

== Goalscorers ==
Rank	Name	Team	Goals
1	(Spain) Manel Expósito	(New Zealand) Auckland City	6
2	(Fiji) Roy Krishna	(New Zealand) Waitakere United	5
3	(Papua New Guinea) Kema Jack	(Papua New Guinea) Hekari United	4
4	(New Zealand) Dave Mulligan	(New Zealand) Auckland City	3
4	(Solomon Islands) Benjamin Totori	(Solomon Islands) Koloale	3
4	(French Polynesia) Axel Williams	(French Polynesia) Tefana	3
4	(South Africa) Ryan De Vries	(New Zealand) Waitakere United	3
4	(New Zealand) Sean Lovemore	(New Zealand) Waitakere United	3
4	(New Zealand) Allan Pearce	(New Zealand) Waitakere United	3
10	(Solomon Islands) Joachim Waroi	(Vanuatu) Amicale	2
10	(England) Adam Dickinson	(New Zealand) Auckland City	2
10	(New Zealand) Daniel Koprivcic	(New Zealand) Auckland City	2
10	(Fiji) Avinesh Swamy	(Fiji) Ba	2
10	(Fiji) Maciu Dunadamu	(Papua New Guinea) Hekari United	2
10	(Solomon Islands) James Naka	(Solomon Islands) Koloale	2
10	(French Polynesia) Roihau Degage	(French Polynesia) Tefana	2
10	(French Polynesia) Taufa Neuffer	(French Polynesia) Tefana	2
10	(French Polynesia) Angelo Tchen	(French Polynesia) Tefana	2
10	(French Polynesia) Alvin Tehau	(French Polynesia) Tefana	2
10	(Wales) Chris Bale	(New Zealand) Waitakere United	2
10	(New Zealand) Ross McKenzie	(New Zealand) Waitakere United	2
22	(Solomon Islands) Alick Maemae	(Vanuatu) Amicale	1
22	(Vanuatu) Fenedy Masauvakalo	(Vanuatu) Amicale	1
22	(Vanuatu) Kensi Tangis	(Vanuatu) Amicale	1
22	(New Zealand) Chad Coombes	(New Zealand) Auckland City	1
22	(New Zealand) Alex Feneridis	(New Zealand) Auckland City	1
22	(New Zealand) Andrew Milne	(New Zealand) Auckland City	1
22	(Argentina) Emiliano Tade	(New Zealand) Auckland City	1
22	(New Zealand) Ivan Vicelich	(New Zealand) Auckland City	1
22	(Fiji) Malakai Kainihewe	(Fiji) Ba	1
22	(Fiji) Jone Salauneune	(Fiji) Ba	1
22	(Fiji) Remueru Tekiate	(Fiji) Ba	1
22	(Fiji) Osea Vakatalesau	(Fiji) Ba	1
22	(Fiji) Jone Vesikula	(Fiji) Ba	1
22	(Fiji) Pita Baleitoga	(Papua New Guinea) Hekari United	1
22	(Papua New Guinea) Andrew Lepani	(Papua New Guinea) Hekari United	1
22	(Fiji) Taniela Waqa	(Papua New Guinea) Hekari United	1
22	(Solomon Islands) Steven Anisi	(Solomon Islands) Koloale	1
22	(Solomon Islands) Ezra Sale	(Solomon Islands) Koloale	1
22	(New Caledonia) José Hmaé	(New Caledonia) Mont-Dore	1
22	(New Caledonia) Michel Hmaé	(New Caledonia) Mont-Dore	1
22	(French Polynesia) Jean-Claude Chang Koei Chang	(French Polynesia) Tefana	1
22	(French Polynesia) Hiva Kamoise	(French Polynesia) Tefana	1
22	(French Polynesia) Sebastian Labayen	(French Polynesia) Tefana	1
22	(French Polynesia) Tetiamana Marmouyet	(French Polynesia) Tefana	1
22	(New Zealand) Matt Cunneen	(New Zealand) Waitakere United	1
22	(New Zealand) Ross Haviland	(New Zealand) Waitakere United	1

Own goals

Rank	Name	Team	Goals	Opponent
1	(New Zealand) James Pritchett	(New Zealand) Auckland City	1	(Vanuatu) Amicale
1	(Fiji) Jone Vesikula	(Fiji) Ba	1	(New Zealand) Waitakere United
1	(Solomon Islands) Francis Lafai	(Solomon Islands) Koloale	1	(New Zealand) Auckland City
