= 2010–11 OFC Champions League =

Tournament details
- Dates: 23 October 2010 – 17 April 2011
- Teams: 8 (from 7 associations)

Final positions
- Champions: (New Zealand) Auckland City (3rd title)
- Runners-up: (Vanuatu) Amicale

Tournament statistics
- Matches played: 26
- Goals scored: 76 (2.92 per match)
- Top scorer: (Vanuatu) Fenedy Masauvakalo (8 goals)

The 2010–11 OFC Champions League, also known as the 2011 O-League for short, was the 10th edition of the Oceanian Club Championship, Oceania's premier club football tournament organized by the Oceania Football Confederation (OFC), and the 5th season under the current OFC Champions League name. It was contested by eight teams from seven countries. The teams were split into two four-team pools, the winner of each pool contesting the title of O-League Champion and the right to represent the OFC at the 2011 FIFA Club World Cup.

The tournament was won by Auckland City of New Zealand.

== Participants ==
Association	Team	Qualifying method
Fiji	Lautoka	2009 Fiji National Football League champion
New Caledonia	Magenta	2009 New Caledonia Division Honneur champion
New Zealand	Waitakere United	2009–10 New Zealand Football Championship champion
New Zealand	Auckland City	2009–10 New Zealand Football Championship premier
Papua New Guinea	Hekari United	2009–10 Papua New Guinea National Soccer League champion
Solomon Islands	Koloale	2009–10 Solomon Islands National Club Championship champion
(French Polynesia) Tahiti	Tefana	2009–10 Tahiti Division Fédérale champion
Vanuatu	Amicale	2009–10 Vanuatu National Soccer League winner

== Schedule ==
Location of teams of the 2010–11 OFC Champions League.

The match schedule is as follows.

Round		Date
Group stage	Matchday 1	23–24 October 2010
Group stage	Matchday 2	13–14 November 2010
Group stage	Matchday 3	4–5 December 2010
Group stage	Matchday 4	5–6 February 2011
Group stage	Matchday 5	26–27 February 2011
Group stage	Matchday 6	19–20 March 2011
Final	First leg	2–3 April 2011
Final	Second leg	16–17 April 2011

== Group stage ==
The official draw was conducted at the OFC Executive Committee meeting in Johannesburg, South Africa in June 2010, and announced by the OFC on 11 June 2010.

In each group, the teams played each other home-and-away in a round-robin format, with the group winner advancing to the final. If two or more teams are tied on points, the tiebreakers are as follow:

1. Goal difference
2. Goals scored
3. Head-to-head record among teams concerned (points; goal difference; goals scored)
4. Fair play record
5. Drawing of lots

=== Group A ===
Team	Pld	W	D	L	GF	GA	GD	Pts	AMI	KOL	LAU	HEK
(Vanuatu) Amicale	6	3	1	2	12	7	+5	10		2–0	5–1	3–3
(Solomon Islands) Koloale	6	3	0	3	10	10	0	9	1–0		1–2	2–1
(Fiji) Lautoka	6	2	2	2	6	13	−7	8	1–0	1–6		0–0
(Papua New Guinea) Hekari United	6	1	3	2	10	8	+2	6	1–2	4–0	1–1	

Legend: Blue = home team win; Yellow = draw; Red = away team win.

23 October 2010
15:00 UTC+11:00

Koloale (Solomon Islands)	1–2	(Fiji) Lautoka
Ian Paia 35'	Report	Matthew Mayora 16', 26'

Lawson Tama Stadium, Honiara
Attendance: 16,000
Referee: Chris Kerr (New Zealand)
23 October 2010
15:00 UTC+10:00

Hekari United (Papua New Guinea)	1–2	(Vanuatu) Amicale
Henry Fa'arodo 57'	Report	Fenedy Masauvakalo 23'; Jack Wetney 49'

PMRL Stadium, Port Moresby
Attendance: 5,500
Referee: Nick Waldron (New Zealand)

13 November 2010
15:00 UTC+13:00

Lautoka (Fiji)	1–0	(Vanuatu) Amicale
Valerio Nawatu 19'	Report

Govind Park, Ba
Referee: John Saohu (Solomon Islands)
13 November 2010
15:00 UTC+10:00

Hekari United (Papua New Guinea)	4–0	(Solomon Islands) Koloale
Henry Fa'arodo 32', 64'; Kema Jack 43'; Abraham Iniga 76'	Report

PMRL Stadium, Port Moresby
Referee: Peter O'Leary (New Zealand)

4 December 2010
15:00 UTC+11:00

Amicale (Vanuatu)	2–0	(Solomon Islands) Koloale
Fenedy Masauvakalo 15', 40'	Report

Port Vila Municipal Stadium, Port Vila
Referee: Chris Kerr (New Zealand)
15 January 2011^{1}
15:00 UTC+13:00

Lautoka (Fiji)	0–0	(Papua New Guinea) Hekari United
	Report

Churchill Park, Lautoka
Attendance: 4,000
Referee: Peter O'Leary (New Zealand)

5 February 2011
15:00 UTC+13:00

Lautoka (Fiji)	1–6	(Solomon Islands) Koloale
Valerio Nawatu 10'	Report	Jeffery Bule 19' (pen.); George Suri 25'; Benjamin Totori 28', 62', 77' (pen.); Ezra Sale 52'

Churchill Park, Lautoka
Referee: Michael Hester (New Zealand)
5 February 2011
15:00 UTC+11:00

Amicale (Vanuatu)	3–3	(Papua New Guinea) Hekari United
Alick Maemae 39' (pen.); Derek Malas 51'; Fenedy Masauvakalo 74'	Report	Osea Vakatalesau 58', 87'; Malakai Tiwa 90+4'

Port Vila Municipal Stadium, Port Vila
Referee: Averii Jacques (Tahiti)

26 February 2011
15:00 UTC+11:00

Koloale (Solomon Islands)	2–1	(Papua New Guinea) Hekari United
Mostyn Beui 20', 66'	Report	Tuimasi Manuca 79'

Lawson Tama Stadium, Honiara
Referee: Chris Kerr (New Zealand)
26 February 2011
15:00 UTC+11:00

Amicale (Vanuatu)	5–1	(Fiji) Lautoka
Fenedy Masauvakalo 7', 45+2', 89'; Alick Maemae 29'; Jack Wetney 33'	Report	Alvin Avinesh 68' (pen.)

Port Vila Municipal Stadium, Port Vila
Referee: Mirko Benischke (New Zealand)

19 March 2011
15:00 UTC+11:00

Koloale (Solomon Islands)	1–0	(Vanuatu) Amicale
Joses Nawo 83'	Report

Lawson Tama Stadium, Honiara
Attendance: 10,000
Referee: Andrew Achari (Fiji)
19 March 2011
15:00 UTC+10:00

Hekari United (Papua New Guinea)	1–1	(Fiji) Lautoka
Andrew Setefano 90+5'	Report	Peni Finau 38'

PMRL Stadium, Port Moresby
Referee: John Saohu (Solomon Islands)

Notes

- Note 1: Postponed from 4 December 2010 due to Hekari United's involvement in the 2010 FIFA Club World Cup.

=== Group B ===
Team	Pld	W	D	L	GF	GA	GD	Pts	AUC	WAI	MAG	TEF
(New Zealand) Auckland City	6	4	2	0	12	2	+10	14		1–0	3–0	5–0
(New Zealand) Waitakere United	6	2	2	2	8	8	0	8	1–1		2–1	3–1
(New Caledonia) Magenta	6	2	1	3	6	7	−1	7	0–1	1–1		1–0
(French Polynesia) Tefana	6	1	1	4	5	14	−9	4	1–1	3–1	0–3	

Legend: Blue = home team win; Yellow = draw; Red = away team win.

23 October 2010
15:00 UTC+13:00

Auckland City (New Zealand)	3–0	(New Caledonia) Magenta
Adam McGeorge 18'; David Mulligan 30'; Daniel Koprivcic 34'	Report

Kiwitea Street, Auckland
Attendance: 896
Referee: Norbert Hauata (Tahiti)
24 October 2010
14:00 UTC+13:00

Waitakere United (New Zealand)	3–1	(French Polynesia) Tefana
Roy Krishna 45+1'; Mike Gwyther 81'; Sean Lovemore 83'	Report	Axel Williams 23'

Fred Taylor Park, Auckland
Attendance: 400
Referee: Andrew Achari (Fiji)

13 November 2010
15:00 UTC+11:00

Magenta (New Caledonia)	1–0	(French Polynesia) Tefana
Jean Philippe Saiko 65'	Report

Stade Numa-Daly Magenta, Noumea
Attendance: 2,000
Referee: Michael Hester (New Zealand)
14 November 2010
14:00 UTC+13:00

Waitakere United (New Zealand)	1–1	(New Zealand) Auckland City
Roy Krishna 82'	Report	Alex Feneridis 90+2'

Fred Taylor Park, Auckland
Referee: Averii Jacques (Tahiti)

4 December 2010
15:00 UTC+11:00

Magenta (New Caledonia)	1–1	(New Zealand) Waitakere United
Francis Watrone 77'	Report	Allan Pearce 70'

Stade Numa-Daly Magenta, Noumea
Referee: John Saohu (Solomon Islands)
3 December 2010
19:15 UTC−10:00

Tefana (French Polynesia)	1–1	(New Zealand) Auckland City
Tetiamana Marmouyet 52'	Report	Ángel Berlanga 90'

Stade Louis Ganivet, Faaa
Referee: Rakesh Varman (Fiji)

4 February 2011
19:15 UTC−10:00

Tefana (French Polynesia)	3–1	(New Zealand) Waitakere United
Lorenzo Tehau 20'; Alvin Tehau 30'; Axel Williams 90+1'	Report	Allan Pearce 45+2' (pen.)

Stade Louis Ganivet, Faaa
Referee: Bertrand Billon (New Caledonia)
21 February 2011^{2}
19:00 UTC+11:00

Magenta (New Caledonia)	0–1	(New Zealand) Auckland City
	Report	Manel Expósito 83'

Stade Numa-Daly Magenta, Noumea
Referee: John Saohu (Solomon Islands)

25 February 2011
19:30 UTC−10:00

Tefana (French Polynesia)	0–3	(New Caledonia) Magenta
	Report	Cesar Lolohea 22'; Georges Gope-Fenepej 78', 81'

Stade Louis Ganivet, Faaa
Referee: Nick Waldron (New Zealand)
27 February 2011
15:00 UTC+13:00

Auckland City (New Zealand)	1–0	(New Zealand) Waitakere United
Stuart Kelly 12'	Report

Kiwitea Street, Auckland
Attendance: 2,500
Referee: Peter O'Leary (New Zealand)

19 March 2011
15:00 UTC+13:00

Waitakere United (New Zealand)	2–1	(New Caledonia) Magenta
Ryan De Vries 31'; Allan Pearce 87'	Report	Benjamin Longue 30' (pen.)

Fred Taylor Park, Auckland
Attendance: 1,000
Referee: Norbert Hauata (Tahiti)
19 March 2011
15:00 UTC+13:00

Auckland City (New Zealand)	5–0	(French Polynesia) Tefana
Ivan Vicelich 28'; Daniel Koprivcic 44', 90+2'; Andrew Milne 59'; Ian Hogg 90' (pen.)	Report

Kiwitea Street, Auckland
Attendance: 1,500
Referee: Campbell-Kirk Waugh (New Zealand)

Notes

- Note 2: Postponed from 5 February 2011 due to unsuitability of the Stade Numa Daly.

== Final ==
The winners of groups A and B played in the final over two legs. The hosts of each leg was decided by draw, and announced by the OFC on 22 March 2011. The away goals rule would be applied, and extra time and penalty shootout would be used to decide the winner if necessary.

Team 1	Agg.	Team 2	1st leg	2nd leg
Amicale (Vanuatu)	1–6	(New Zealand) Auckland City	1–2	0–4

2 April 2011
15:00 UTC+11:00

Amicale (Vanuatu)	1–2	(New Zealand) Auckland City
Fenedy Masauvakalo 67'	Report	Manel Expósito 22' (pen.); Luis Corrales 82'

Port Vila Municipal Stadium, Port Vila
Attendance: 7,925
Referee: Bertrand Billon (New Caledonia)

17 April 2011
14:00 UTC+12:00

Auckland City (New Zealand)	4–0	(Vanuatu) Amicale
Alex Feneridis 26'; Daniel Koprivcic 62' (pen.); Manel Expósito 72'; Adam McGeorge 82'	Report

Kiwitea Street, Auckland
Attendance: 3,000
Referee: Norbert Hauata (Tahiti)

Auckland City won 6–1 on aggregate. As OFC Champions League winners they qualify for the qualifying round of the 2011 FIFA Club World Cup.

OFC Champions League
2010–11 Winners
(New Zealand)
Auckland City
Third title

== Goalscorers ==
- Goalscorer statistics correct as of 17 April 2011.

Name	Club	Goals
(Vanuatu) Fenedy Masauvakalo	(Vanuatu) Amicale	8
(Croatia) Daniel Koprivcic	(New Zealand) Auckland City	3
(Spain) Manel Expósito	(New Zealand) Auckland City	3
(Solomon Islands) Henry Fa'arodo	(Papua New Guinea) Hekari United	3
(Solomon Islands) Benjamin Totori	(Solomon Islands) Koloale	3
(New Zealand) Allan Pearce	(New Zealand) Waitakere United	3
(Solomon Islands) Alick Maemae	(Vanuatu) Amicale	2
(Solomon Islands) Jack Wetney	(Vanuatu) Amicale	2
(New Caledonia) Georges Gope-Fenepej	(New Caledonia) Magenta	2
(French Polynesia) Axel Williams	(French Polynesia) Tefana	2
(New Zealand) Adam McGeorge	(New Zealand) Auckland City	2
(New Zealand) Alex Feneridis	(New Zealand) Auckland City	2
(Solomon Islands) Mostyn Beui	(Solomon Islands) Koloale	2
(Australia) Matthew Mayora	(Fiji) Lautoka	2
(Fiji) Valerio Nawatu	(Fiji) Lautoka	2
(Fiji) Osea Vakatalesau	(Papua New Guinea) Hekari United	2
(Fiji) Roy Krishna	(New Zealand) Waitakere United	2
(Vanuatu) Derek Malas	(Vanuatu) Amicale	1
(New Caledonia) Benjamin Longue	(New Caledonia) Magenta	1
(New Caledonia) Cesar Lolohea	(New Caledonia) Magenta	1
(New Caledonia) Francis Watrone	(New Caledonia) Magenta	1
(New Caledonia) Jean Phillipe Saiko	(New Caledonia) Magenta	1
(French Polynesia) Alvin Tehau	(French Polynesia) Tefana	1
(French Polynesia) Lorenzo Tehau	(French Polynesia) Tefana	1
(French Polynesia) Tetiamana Marmouyet	(French Polynesia) Tefana	1
(Spain) Albert Vidal	(New Zealand) Auckland City	1
(New Zealand) Andrew Milne	(New Zealand) Auckland City	1
(Spain) Ángel Berlanga	(New Zealand) Auckland City	1
(New Zealand) David Mulligan	(New Zealand) Auckland City	1
(New Zealand) Ian Hogg	(New Zealand) Auckland City	1
(New Zealand) Ivan Vicelich	(New Zealand) Auckland City	1
(Costa Rica) Luis Corrales	(New Zealand) Auckland City	1
(Scotland) Stuart Kelly	(New Zealand) Auckland City	1
(Fiji) Alvin Avinesh	(Fiji) Lautoka	1
(Fiji) Peni Finau	(Fiji) Lautoka	1
(Solomon Islands) Abraham Iniga	(Papua New Guinea) Hekari United	1
(Samoa) Andrew Setefano	(Papua New Guinea) Hekari United	1
(Papua New Guinea) Kema Jack	(Papua New Guinea) Hekari United	1
(Fiji) Malakai Tiwa	(Papua New Guinea) Hekari United	1
(Fiji) Tuimasi Manuca	(Papua New Guinea) Hekari United	1
(Solomon Islands) Ezra Sale	(Solomon Islands) Koloale	1
(Solomon Islands) George Suri	(Solomon Islands) Koloale	1
(Solomon Islands) Ian Paia	(Solomon Islands) Koloale	1
(Solomon Islands) Jeffrey Bule	(Solomon Islands) Koloale	1
(Solomon Islands) Joses Nawo	(Solomon Islands) Koloale	1
(New Zealand) Mike Gwyther	(New Zealand) Waitakere United	1
(South Africa) Ryan De Vries	(New Zealand) Waitakere United	1
(New Zealand) Sean Lovemore	(New Zealand) Waitakere United	1
