= 2015–16 Wellington Phoenix FC season =

Wellington Phoenix
2015–16 season
- Chairman: Rob Morrison
- Manager: Ernie Merrick
- Stadium: Westpac Stadium, Wellington
- A-League: 9th
- ASB Premiership: 7th
- FFA Cup: Round of 16
- Top goalscorer: League: Blake Powell (8 goals); All: Blake Powell (9 goals)
- Highest home attendance: 13,584 vs Adelaide United; 13 November 2015
- Lowest home attendance: 5,103 vs Melbourne Victory; 2 April 2016
- Average home league attendance: 8,042
Home colours	Away colours

The 2015–16 Wellington Phoenix FC season was the club's ninth season since its establishment in 2007. The club participated in the A-League for the ninth time, the FFA Cup for the second time, and fielded a reserves squad in the ASB Premiership for the second time.

== Players ==
=== Squad information ===
Note: Flags indicate national team as defined under FIFA eligibility rules; some limited exceptions apply. Players may hold more than one non-FIFA nationality.

No.	Pos.	Nation	Player
1	GK	NZL	Glen Moss
2	DF	MLT	Manny Muscat
3	DF	NZL	Justin Gulley
4	MF	CUW	Roly Bonevacia
5	DF	AUS	Troy Danaskos
6	DF	AUS	Dylan Fox
8	MF	ESP	Alex Rodriguez
10	MF	NZL	Michael McGlinchey
11	FW	NZL	Kwabena Appiah
12	FW	AUS	Blake Powell
13	MF	ESP	Albert Riera
14	MF	NZL	Alex Rufer

No.	Pos.	Nation	Player
15	MF	NZL	James McGarry (Youth)
16	MF	NZL	Louis Fenton
17	MF	AUS	Vince Lia
18	DF	NZL	Ben Sigmund (Vice-captain)
19	DF	NZL	Tom Doyle
20	GK	AUS	Lewis Italiano
21	FW	FIJ	Roy Krishna
22	DF	AUS	Andrew Durante (Captain)
23	MF	NZL	Matthew Ridenton
24	FW	NZL	Logan Rogerson (Youth)
26	FW	NZL	Hamish Watson (Injury replacement)

=== From youth squad ===
N	Pos.	Nat.	Name	Age	Notes
29	FW	(New Zealand)	Joel Stevens	20	
30	GK	(New Zealand)	Oliver Sail	19	
31	MF	(New Zealand)	Andrew Blake	19	
32	DF	(New Zealand)	Tamupiwa Dimairo	19	
15	MF	(New Zealand)	James McGarry	17	
24	FW	(New Zealand)	Logan Rogerson	17	
3	DF	(New Zealand)	Justin Gulley	22	

=== Transfers in ===
No.	Pos.	Nat.	Name	Age	Moving from	Type	Transfer window	Ends	Transfer fee	Source
12	FW	(Australia)	Blake Powell	24	APIA Leichhardt Tigers (Australia)	Transfer	Pre-season	2016	Free	
7	MF	(Netherlands)	Jeffrey Sarpong	27	Free agent	Transfer	Pre-season	2017	Free	
5	DF	(Australia)	Troy Danaskos	23	Sydney Olympic (Australia)	Transfer	Pre-season	2016	Free	
6	DF	(Australia)	Dylan Fox	21	Bonnyrigg White Eagles (Australia)	Transfer	Pre-season	2017	Free	
26	FW	(New Zealand)	Hamish Watson	22	Hawke's Bay United	Injury replacement	Round 19	2016	Free	

=== Transfers out ===
No.	Pos.	Nat.	Name	Age	Moving to	Type	Transfer window	Transfer fee	Source
12	FW	(New Zealand)	Tyler Boyd	20	Vitória de Guimarães (Portugal)	End of contract	Pre-season		
5	DF	(New Zealand)	Michael Boxall	26	SuperSport United (South Africa)	Released	Pre-season		
6	DF	(Australia)	Josh Brindell-South	22		Released	Pre-season		
7	FW	(Costa Rica)	Kenny Cunningham	29		Released	Pre-season		
15	MF	(New Zealand)	Jason Hicks	25		Released	Pre-season		
3	FW	(Australia)	Joel Griffiths	35		Released	Pre-season		
9	FW	(Australia)	Nathan Burns	27	FC Tokyo (Japan)	Transfer	Pre-season		
7	MF	(Netherlands)	Jeffrey Sarpong	27		Released	Round 17		

=== Contracts Extensions ===
Name	Position	Duration	Contract Expiry	Notes
(New Zealand) Lewis Italiano	Goalkeeper	1 year	2017	
(Australia) Dylan Fox	Defender	3 years	2019	
(Spain) Alex Rodriguez	Central midfielder	1 year	2017	
(New Zealand) Tom Doyle	Left-back	1 year	2017	
(New Zealand) Matthew Ridenton	Midfielder	2 years	2018	
(Australia) Blake Powell	Striker	1 year	2017	

== Technical staff ==
Position	Name
Head coach	(Scotland) Ernie Merrick
Assistant coach	(England) Chris Greenacre
Reserves Team Coach	(England) Andy Hedge
Goalkeeping coach	(Scotland) Jonathan Gould
Strength & conditioning coach	(Scotland) Lee Spence

== Statistics ==
=== Squad statistics ===
N	Pos.	Nat.	Name	Total					A-League					FFA Cup					ASB Premiership
N	Pos.	Nat.	Name	Apps	Goals	Yellow card	Second yellow card	Red card	Apps	Goals	Yellow card	Second yellow card	Red card	Apps	Goals	Yellow card	Second yellow card	Red card	Apps	Goals	Yellow card	Second yellow card	Red card
1	GK	(New Zealand)	Glen Moss	28	0	1	0	0	27+0	0	1	0	0	1+0	0	0	0	0	0+0	0	0	0	0
2	DF	(Malta)	Manny Muscat	27	1	7	0	0	25+0	1	6	0	0	2+0	0	1	0	0	0+0	0	0	0	0
3	DF	(New Zealand)	Justin Gulley	12	0	1	0	0	7+1	0	0	0	0	0+0	0	0	0	0	4+0	0	1	0	0
4	MF	(Curaçao)	Roly Bonevacia	28	6	8	0	0	26+0	6	7	0	0	2+0	0	1	0	0	0+0	0	0	0	0
5	DF	(Australia)	Troy Danaskos	12	0	1	0	0	4+2	0	1	0	0	0+0	0	0	0	0	6+0	0	0	0	0
6	DF	(Australia)	Dylan Fox	17	0	6	1	0	8+4	0	5	0	0	0+0	0	0	0	0	5+0	0	1	1	0
8	MF	(Spain)	Alex Rodriguez	24	0	5	0	0	18+6	0	5	0	0	0+0	0	0	0	0	0+0	0	0	0	0
10	MF	(New Zealand)	Michael McGlinchey	28	3	0	0	0	26+0	3	0	0	0	2+0	0	0	0	0	0+0	0	0	0	0
11	FW	(New Zealand)	Kwabena Appiah	15	1	0	0	0	1+13	0	0	0	0	1+0	1	0	0	0	0+0	0	0	0	0
12	FW	(Australia)	Blake Powell	24	9	2	0	0	13+10	8	2	0	0	0+0	0	0	0	0	1+0	1	0	0	0
13	MF	(Spain)	Albert Riera	26	0	7	2	0	24+0	0	6	2	0	2+0	0	1	0	0	0+0	0	0	0	0
14	MF	(New Zealand)	Alex Rufer	8	0	1	0	0	1+3	0	0	0	0	1+1	0	0	0	0	2+0	0	1	0	0
15	MF	(New Zealand)	James McGarry	13	5	1	0	0	0+1	0	0	0	0	0+0	0	0	0	0	11+1	5	1	0	0
16	MF	(New Zealand)	Louis Fenton	21	1	4	0	0	11+9	1	3	0	0	1+0	0	1	0	0	0+0	0	0	0	0
17	MF	(Australia)	Vince Lia	18	1	7	0	0	13+3	1	6	0	0	0+2	0	1	0	0	0+0	0	0	0	0
18	DF	(New Zealand)	Ben Sigmund	18	0	4	0	0	12+3	0	3	0	0	2+0	0	1	0	0	1+0	0	0	0	0
19	DF	(New Zealand)	Tom Doyle	21	1	9	0	0	17+3	1	9	0	0	0+1	0	0	0	0	0+0	0	0	0	0
20	GK	(Australia)	Lewis Italiano	7	0	0	0	0	0+0	0	0	0	0	1+0	0	0	0	0	6+0	0	0	0	0
21	FW	(Fiji)	Roy Krishna	18	7	4	0	0	16+0	6	3	0	0	2+0	1	1	0	0	0+0	0	0	0	0
22	DF	(New Zealand)	Andrew Durante	26	0	7	0	0	24+0	0	7	0	0	2+0	0	0	0	0	0+0	0	0	0	0
23	MF	(New Zealand)	Matthew Ridenton	20	4	2	0	0	7+8	3	2	0	0	2+0	0	0	0	0	3+0	1	0	0	0
24	FW	(New Zealand)	Logan Rogerson	11	3	0	0	0	0+0	0	0	0	0	0+0	0	0	0	0	9+2	3	0	0	0
25	DF	(New Zealand)	Tamupiwa Dimairo	12	0	3	0	0	0+0	0	0	0	0	0+1	0	0	0	0	10+1	0	3	0	0
26	FW	(New Zealand)	Hamish Watson	8	3	1	1	0	6+2	3	1	1	0	0+0	0	0	0	0	0+0	0	0	0	0
26	DF	(New Zealand)	Ben Stroud	0	0	0	0	0	0+0	0	0	0	0	0+0	0	0	0	0	0+0	0	0	0	0
28	FW	(New Zealand)	Joel Stevens	14	3	0	0	0	2+3	0	0	0	0	0+1	0	0	0	0	8+0	3	0	0	0
29	MF	(New Zealand)	Andrew Blake	10	2	2	0	0	0+0	0	0	0	0	1+0	0	0	0	0	9+0	2	2	0	0
30	GK	(New Zealand)	Oliver Sail	11	0	0	0	0	0+0	0	0	0	0	0+0	0	0	0	0	8+3	0	0	0	0
31	DF	(New Zealand)	Luke Tongue	5	0	0	0	0	0+0	0	0	0	0	0+0	0	0	0	0	4+1	0	0	0	0
32	MF	(New Zealand)	Sarpreet Singh	12	1	3	0	0	0+0	0	0	0	0	0+0	0	0	0	0	12+0	1	3	0	0
34	MF	(New Zealand)	Sam Gillespie	2	0	0	0	0	0+0	0	0	0	0	0+0	0	0	0	0	1+1	0	0	0	0
35	MF	(New Zealand)	Ruari Cahill-Fleury	10	2	0	0	0	0+0	0	0	0	0	0+0	0	0	0	0	2+8	2	0	0	0
35	MF	(New Zealand)	Nick Lane	1	0	0	0	0	0+0	0	0	0	0	0+0	0	0	0	0	0+1	0	0	0	0
36	MF	(New Zealand)	Liam Wood	10	0	3	0	0	0+0	0	0	0	0	0+0	0	0	0	0	8+2	0	3	0	0
37	DF	(New Zealand)	Sam Philip	8	0	1	0	0	0+0	0	0	0	0	0+0	0	0	0	0	6+2	0	1	0	0
38	DF	(New Zealand)	Sam Wilson	1	0	0	0	0	0+0	0	0	0	0	0+0	0	0	0	0	1+0	0	0	0	0
39	MF	(New Zealand)	Joe Bell	14	0	1	0	0	0+0	0	0	0	0	0+0	0	0	0	0	10+4	0	1	0	0
41	MF	(New Zealand)	Cherbel Khouchaba	14	1	0	0	0	0+0	0	0	0	0	0+0	0	0	0	0	5+9	1	0	0	0
42	MF	(New Zealand)	Oliver Whyte	2	1	0	0	0	0+0	0	0	0	0	0+0	0	0	0	0	0+2	1	0	0	0
43	GK	(New Zealand)	Marcel Kampman	0	0	0	0	0	0+0	0	0	0	0	0+0	0	0	0	0	0+0	0	0	0	0
44	DF	(New Zealand)	Louis Evans	9	1	2	0	0	0+0	0	0	0	0	0+0	0	0	0	0	8+1	1	2	0	0
45	MF	(New Zealand)	Max Mata	6	3	0	0	0	0+0	0	0	0	0	0+0	0	0	0	0	6+0	3	0	0	0
46	DF	(New Zealand)	Jack Sinclair	4	0	1	0	0	0+0	0	0	0	0	0+0	0	0	0	0	2+2	0	1	0	0
47	MF	(New Zealand)	Liam Hare	6	0	0	0	0	0+0	0	0	0	0	0+0	0	0	0	0	6+0	0	0	0	0
50	GK	(New Zealand)	Bgoni Washington	0	0	0	0	0	0+0	0	0	0	0	0+0	0	0	0	0	0+0	0	0	0	0
Players no longer at the club:
7	MF	(Netherlands)	Jeffrey Sarpong	13	0	1	0	0	9+4	0	1	0	0	0+0	0	0	0	0	0+0	0	0	0	0

- Last updated: 10 April 2016
- Source: au.soccerway.com
- (yellow card) = Number of bookings; (second yellow card) = Number of sending offs after a second yellow card; (red card) = Number of sending offs by a direct red card.

== Pre-season and friendlies ==
27 June 2015 Fiji Tour	Fiji U-23	2–1	(New Zealand) Phoenix Premiers	Suva, Fiji
14:30 FJT	Matarerega 54'; Nakalevu 80'	Report	McGarry (?)	Stadium: ANZ National Stadium

27 June 2015 Fiji Tour	Fiji	1–2	(New Zealand) Wellington Phoenix	Suva, Fiji
17:30 FJT	Krishna 24'	Report	Bonevacia 40'; Doyle 77'	Stadium: ANZ National Stadium; Attendance: 12,000

30 June 2015 Fiji Tour	Fiji U-23	1–3	(New Zealand) Phoenix Premiers	Ba, Fiji
15:00 FJT	Qasevakatini 69'	Report	Cahill-Fleury 17'; Mata 32', 48'	Stadium: Govind Park

30 June 2015 Fiji Tour	Fiji	2–2	(New Zealand) Wellington Phoenix	Ba, Fiji
18:00 FJT	Krishna 80'; Jese 83'	Report	Gulley 12'; Appiah 16'	Stadium: Govind Park

13 July 2015	Stop Out (New Zealand)	1–4	(New Zealand) Wellington Phoenix	Timaru, New Zealand
	Grimley (?)	Report	Krishna (?); McGlinchey (?)	Stadium: Fraser Park

21 July 2015	Petone (New Zealand)	3–3	(New Zealand) Wellington Phoenix	Petone, New Zealand
	Green 31'; Elia 36' (pen.), 51'	Report	Bonevacia (?); McGarry (?); Rogerson (?)	Stadium: Petone Memorial Park

22 July 2015	Wellington Phoenix (New Zealand)	3–0	(New Zealand) Miramar Rangers	Wellington, New Zealand
	Appiah 20', 48'; Cahill-Fleury 77'	Report		Stadium: Alex Moore Park

28 July 2015	Wests (New Zealand)	3–2	(New Zealand) Wellington Phoenix	Porirua, New Zealand
	Sippola 59' (pen.); Billingsley (?); Parker-Price (?)	Report	Powell 55'; McGarry (?)	Stadium: Ole Football Academy

23 August 2015	New Zealand	2–1	(New Zealand) Wellington Phoenix	New Plymouth, New Zealand
13:30 NZST	Fenton (?); Rufer (?)	Report	Krishna (?)	Stadium: Yarrow Stadium

30 August 2015	Wellington Phoenix (New Zealand)	3–3	(Australia) Capital Football XI	Raumati Beach, New Zealand
14:00 NZST	Powell 10'; Appiah 25', 49'	Report	Viera (?); Corrales 75'	Stadium: Weka Park

13 September 2015 Sinopec Tour	Western Sydney Wanderers (Australia)	1–3	(New Zealand) Wellington Phoenix	Parramatta, Australia
18:00 AEST	Nichols 70'	Report	Bonevacia 8', 16'; Powell 85'	Stadium: Pirtek Stadium; Referee: Stephen Lucas

15 September 2015 Sinopec Tour	APIA Leichhardt Tigers (Australia)	3–5	(New Zealand) Wellington Phoenix	Sydney, Australia
19:30 AEST	Olsen 38'; Elasi 74'; Biczo 88'	Report	45' (o.g.); McGarry 57'; Ridenton 64'; Appiah 76', 83'	Stadium: Leichhardt Oval; Referee: Steve Lucas

18 September 2015 Sinopec Tour	Sydney FC (Australia)	1–3	(New Zealand) Wellington Phoenix	Wollongong, Australia
19:45 AEST	Hološko 67'	Report	Krishna 32'; Powell 37', 38'	Stadium: WIN Stadium; Attendance: 2,874; Referee: Strebre Delovski

26 September 2015 Sinopec Tour	Wellington Phoenix (New Zealand)	2–2	(New Zealand) Auckland City	Wellington, New Zealand
14:00 NZST	Danaskos 36'; Krishna 23'	Report	De Vries 15', 62'	Stadium: Westpac Stadium

== Competitions ==
=== Overview ===
Competition	First match	Last match	Starting round	Final position	Record							
Competition	First match	Last match	Starting round	Final position	Pld	W	D	L	GF	GA	GD	Win %
A-League	11 October 2015	10 April 2016	Matchday 1	9th	27	7	4	16	34	54	−20	25.93
FFA Cup	4 August 2015	7 November 2015	Round of 32	Round of 16	2	1	0	1	2	5	−3	50.00
Total					29	8	4	17	36	59	−23	27.59

Source: Competitions

=== A-League ===
==== League table ====
Pos	Team	Pld	W	D	L	GF	GA	GD	Pts	Qualification
1	Adelaide United (C)	27	14	7	6	45	28	+17	49	Qualification for 2017 AFC Champions League group stage and Finals series
2	Western Sydney Wanderers	27	14	6	7	44	33	+11	48	Qualification for 2017 AFC Champions League group stage and Finals series
3	Brisbane Roar	27	14	6	7	49	40	+9	48	Qualification for 2017 AFC Champions League second preliminary round and Finals series
4	Melbourne City	27	13	5	9	63	44	+19	44	Qualification for Finals series
5	Perth Glory	27	13	4	10	49	42	+7	43	Qualification for Finals series
6	Melbourne Victory	27	11	8	8	40	33	+7	41	Qualification for Finals series
7	Sydney FC	27	8	10	9	36	36	0	34	
8	Newcastle Jets	27	8	6	13	28	41	−13	30	
9	Wellington Phoenix (Note: Wellington Phoenix cannot qualify for the AFC Champions League as they are not recognised as an AFC club.)	27	7	4	16	34	54	−20	25	
10	Central Coast Mariners	27	3	4	20	33	70	−37	13	

Source: A-Leagues
Rules for classification: 1) points; 2) goal difference; 3) number of goals scored.
(C) Champions

==== Results summary ====
Overall								Home						Away					
Pld	W	D	L	GF	GA	GD	Pts	W	D	L	GF	GA	GD	W	D	L	GF	GA	GD
27	7	4	16	34	54	−20	25	4	2	7	16	24	−8	3	2	9	18	30	−12

Last updated: 10 April 2016.
Source: ultimatealeague.com

==== Results by round ====
Round	1	2	3	4	5	6	7	8	9	10	11	12	13	14	15	16	17	18	19	20	21	22	23	24	25	26	27
Ground	H	A	H	A	A	H	A	A	H	A	H	A	A	H	A	A	H	H	A	A	H	H	A	H	A	H	H
Result	L	W	W	L	D	W	L	D	W	L	D	L	L	D	L	L	L	L	W	L	W	L	W	L	L	L	L
Position	8	5	3	5	7	6	6	7	6	6	6	6	6	7	7	8	8	9	9	9	9	9	9	9	9	9	9

Updated to match(es) played on 10 April 2016. Source: ultimatealeague.com
A = Away; H = Home; W = Win; D = Draw; L = Loss

==== Matches ====
Win Draw Loss

11 October 2015 1	Wellington Phoenix	1–2	Newcastle Jets	Wellington
19:00 NZDT	Lee 45+2' (o.g.)	Report	Carney 30'; Trifunović 70'; Boogaard (yellow card) 52' (yellow-red card) 77'	Stadium: Westpac Stadium; Attendance: 6,255; Referee: Shaun Evans

18 October 2015 2	Perth Glory	1–2	Wellington Phoenix	Perth
16:00 AWST	Sándor 7'; R. Garcia (yellow card) 72' (yellow-red card) 84'	Report	Krishna 9'; Lia 89'	Stadium: nib Stadium; Attendance: 8,145; Referee: Stephen Lucas

24 October 2015 3	Wellington Phoenix	3–2	Brisbane Roar	Wellington
19:15 NZDT	McGlinchey 35'; Krishna 49'; Powell 78'	Report	D. Petratos 26'; North 60'	Stadium: Westpac Stadium; Attendance: 6,103; Referee: Jarred Gillett

2 November 2015 4	Melbourne Victory	3–0	Wellington Phoenix	Melbourne
19:30 AEDT	Berisha 10', 61'; Durante 55' (o.g.)	Report		Stadium: Etihad Stadium; Attendance: 24,934; Referee: Shaun Evans

8 November 2015 5	Central Coast Mariners	1–1	Wellington Phoenix	Gosford
17:00 AEDT	O'Donovan 76'	Report	McGlinchey 8'	Stadium: Central Coast Stadium; Attendance: 6,460; Referee: Chris Beath

13 November 2015 6	Wellington Phoenix	4–2	Adelaide United	Wellington
19:30 NZDT	Krishna 4'; Bonevacia 22', 51'; Ridenton 68'	Report	Goodwin 3'; Sánchez 89'	Stadium: Westpac Stadium; Attendance: 13,584; Referee: Ben Williams

21 November 2015 7	Western Sydney Wanderers	2–1	Wellington Phoenix	Parramatta
17:15 AEDT	Piovaccari 9'; Bridge 85'	Report	Muscat 18'	Stadium: Pirtek Stadium; Attendance: 14,426; Referee: Strebre Delovski

26 November 2015 8	Sydney FC	0–0	Wellington Phoenix	Sydney
20:00 AEDT		Report		Stadium: Allianz Stadium; Attendance: 9,253; Referee: Chris Beath

5 December 2015 9	Wellington Phoenix	2–0	Melbourne Victory	Auckland
19:15 NZDT	Krishna 18'; Bonevacia 44'	Report		Stadium: QBE Stadium; Attendance: 10,852; Referee: Alan Milliner

12 December 2015 10	Brisbane Roar	2–1	Wellington Phoenix	Cairns
16:15 AEST	Lustica 71'; Maclaren 86'	Report	Krishna 45+1'	Stadium: Cazaly's Stadium; Attendance: 5,162; Referee: Jarred Gillett

19 December 2015 11	Wellington Phoenix	1–1	Sydney FC	Wellington
19:15 NZDT	Krishna 89' (pen.)	Report	Hološko 84'	Stadium: Westpac Stadium; Attendance: 10,027; Referee: Peter Green

26 December 2015 12	Adelaide United	3–0	Wellington Phoenix	Adelaide
16:45 ACDT	Muscat 42' (o.g.); Goodwin 73'; Marrone 75'	Report	Riera (yellow card) 12' (yellow-red card) 56'	Stadium: Coopers Stadium; Attendance: 11,655; Referee: Chris Beath

31 December 2015 13	Central Coast Mariners	3–1	Wellington Phoenix	Gosford
19:00 AEDT	F. Ferreira 27' (pen.); Austin 30'; Neill 70'	Report	Powell 67'	Stadium: Central Coast Stadium; Attendance: 10,073; Referee: Kris Griffiths-Jones

10 January 2016 14	Wellington Phoenix	0–0	Brisbane Roar	Wellington
19:00 NZDT		Report		Stadium: Westpac Stadium; Attendance: 7,774; Referee: Stephen Lucas

17 January 2016 15	Newcastle Jets	3–1	Wellington Phoenix	Newcastle
17:00 AEDT	Trifunović 7' (pen.); Kitto 26'; Kantarovski (yellow card) 36' (yellow-red card) 58'; Carney 66'	Report	Ridenton 81'	Stadium: Hunter Stadium; Attendance: 7,595; Referee: Jarred Gillett

25 January 2016 16	Melbourne City	3–1	Wellington Phoenix	Melbourne
19:30 AEDT	Fornaroli 12'; Novillo 31', 49'	Report	Bonevacia 66'	Stadium: AAMI Park; Attendance: 10,825; Referee: Peter Green

30 January 2016 17	Wellington Phoenix	1–3	Central Coast Mariners	Christchurch
19:15 NZDT	Powell 90+2'	Report	García 50'; Roux 53'; Austin 85'	Stadium: AMI Stadium; Attendance: 8,545; Referee: Strebre Delovski

7 February 2016 18	Wellington Phoenix	0–1	Perth Glory	Wellington
17:00 NZDT		Report	Harold 21'	Stadium: Westpac Stadium; Attendance: 7,135; Referee: Jarred Gillett

14 February 2016 19	Western Sydney Wanderers	2–5	Wellington Phoenix	Parramatta
17:00 AEDT	Nichols 75'; Bridge 84'; Aspropotamitis (red card) 89'	Report	Powell 4', 20', 33', 71'; McGlinchey 90' (pen.)	Stadium: Pirtek Stadium; Attendance: 12,589; Referee: Peter Green

20 February 2016 20	Newcastle Jets	3–2	Wellington Phoenix	Newcastle
17:15 AEDT	Durante 27' (o.g.); Nordstrand 53', 73'	Report	Watson 22', 37' (yellow card) 41' (yellow-red card) 71'	Stadium: Hunter Stadium; Attendance: 7,120; Referee: Chris Beath

26 February 2016 21	Wellington Phoenix	2–1	Melbourne City	Wellington
19:30 NZDT	Fenton 12'; Ridenton 15'	Report	Mooy 19'	Stadium: Westpac Stadium; Attendance: 6,591; Referee: Matthew Conger

5 March 2016 22	Wellington Phoenix	0–4	Adelaide United	Wellington
19:15 NZDT		Report	McGowan 31'; Mauk 41'; Djite 49'; Sánchez 90'	Stadium: Westpac Stadium; Attendance: 6,595; Referee: Peter Green

12 March 2016 23	Sydney FC	1–3	Wellington Phoenix	Sydney
17:15 AEDT	Hološko 51'	Report	Powell 12'; Watson 13'; Bonevacia 37'	Stadium: Allianz Stadium; Attendance: 10,235; Referee: Takuto Okabe (Japan)

20 March 2016 24	Wellington Phoenix	1–2	Perth Glory	Wellington
17:00 NZDT	Doyle 90+2'	Report	Keogh 36'; Castro 74'	Stadium: Westpac Stadium; Attendance: 5,844; Referee: Ben Williams

28 March 2016 25	Melbourne City	3–0	Wellington Phoenix	Melbourne
19:30 AEDT	Novillo 43'; Fornaroli 66', 80'	Report		Stadium: AAMI Park; Attendance: 9,895; Referee: Chris Beath

2 April 2016 26	Wellington Phoenix	1–4	Melbourne Victory	Wellington
19:15 NZDT	Riera (yellow card) 45+2' (yellow-red card) 55'; Bonevacia 82'	Report	Berisha 8' (red card) 35'; Bozanic 19'; Barbarouses 56'; Howard 90+3'	Stadium: Westpac Stadium; Attendance: 5,103; Referee: Ben Williams

10 April 2016 27	Wellington Phoenix	0–2	Western Sydney Wanderers	Wellington
17:00 NZST		Report	Šantalab 31', 44'	Stadium: Westpac Stadium; Attendance: 10,143; Referee: Shaun Evans

=== FFA Cup ===
11 August 2015 Round of 32	Central Coast Mariners (New South Wales)	0–1	(New Zealand) Wellington Phoenix	Gosford, Australia
19:30 (AEST)		Report	Appiah 17'	Stadium: Central Coast Stadium; Attendance: 6,111; Referee: Steve Lucas

26 August 2015 Round of 16	Melbourne City (Victoria (state))	5–1	(New Zealand) Wellington Phoenix	Melbourne, Australia
19:30 (AEST)	Mooy 18' (pen.); Novillo 21'; Fornaroli 32' (pen.); Koren 40'; Dekker 49'	Report	Krishna 34' (pen.)	Stadium: AAMI Park; Attendance: 4,027; Referee: Lucien Laverdure

=== ASB Premiership ===
==== League table ====
Pos	Team	Pld	W	D	L	GF	GA	GD	Pts	Qualification
1	Auckland City	13	11	2	0	39	11	+28	35	Qualification to the Champions League and Finals series
2	Hawke's Bay United	13	8	3	2	27	15	+12	27	Qualification to the Champions League and Finals series
3	Team Wellington	14	8	3	3	36	21	+15	27	Qualification to the Finals series
4	Canterbury United	13	7	2	4	25	21	+4	23	Qualification to the Finals series
5	WaiBOP United	13	6	0	7	28	23	+5	18	
6	Waitakere United	13	4	1	8	22	34	−12	13	
7	Phoenix Premiers	14	2	1	11	24	46	−22	7	
8	Southern United	13	1	0	12	9	39	−30	3	

Updated to match(es) played on 24 February 2016. Source: NZ Football

==== Results summary ====
Overall								Home						Away					
Pld	W	D	L	GF	GA	GD	Pts	W	D	L	GF	GA	GD	W	D	L	GF	GA	GD
14	2	1	11	24	46	−22	7	2	0	5	11	22	−11	0	1	6	13	24	−11

Last updated: 26 February 2016.
Source: soccerway.com

==== Results by round ====
Round	1	2	3	4	5	6	7	8	9	10	11	12	13	14
Ground	H	H	A	H	A	A	H	A	A	A	H	H	A	H
Result	L	L	L	W	D	L	L	L	L	L	L	W	L	L
Position	8	7	8	6	6	7	7	7	7	7	7	7	7	7

Updated to match(es) played on 26 February 2016. Source: soccerway.com
A = Away; H = Home; W = Win; D = Draw; L = Loss

==== Matches ====
15 November 2015 1	Phoenix Premiers	0–3	Canterbury United	Wellington
14:00 NZST		Report	White 69', 72'; Chang 84'	Stadium: David Farrington Park; Referee: Matthew Conger

22 November 2015 2	Phoenix Premiers	1–3	Auckland City	Wellington
14:00 NZST	McGarry 65'	Report	De Vries 33'; Lewis 63'; Álvaro 75'	Stadium: Newtown Park; Referee: Campbell-Kirk Waugh

29 November 2015 3	Southern United	1–0	Phoenix Premiers	Dunedin
14:00 NZST	Ridden 8'	Report		Stadium: Forsyth Barr Stadium; Referee: John Rowbury

3 December 2015 4	Phoenix Premiers	2–1	Waitakere United	Auckland
19:35 NZST	Mata 40'; Ridenton 53'	Report	Bowen 16'	Stadium: Mount Smart Stadium; Referee: Campbell-Kirk Waugh

13 December 2015 5	Hawke's Bay United	5–5	Phoenix Premiers	Napier
13:00 NZST	Watson 47'; Chettleburgh 49'; Sole 68'; Mason-Smith 71', 90+2'	Report	Stevens 9', 57' (pen.); Mata 14', 23'; Rogerson 44'; Fox (yellow card) 31' (yellow-red card) 66'	Stadium: Bluewater Stadium; Referee: Chris Kerr

20 December 2015 6	Team Wellington	3–2	Phoenix Premiers	Wellington
14:00 NZST	Harris 36'; Peverley 45+1'; Musa 85'	Report	Powell 68' (pen.); Stevens 90+6'	Stadium: David Farrington Park; Referee: Antony Riley

9 January 2016 7	Phoenix Premiers	3–4	WaiBOP United	Wellington
14:00 NZST	Rogerson 46'; Blake 47'; Evans 81'	Report	Tinsley 52' (pen.), 90+6'; Hoyle 64'; Ilich 69'	Stadium: Newtown Park; Referee: Nick Waldron

17 January 2016 8	Waitakere United	4–1	Phoenix Premiers	Auckland
16:35 NZST	Manickum 23'; Lovemore 45+1'; Bowen 90'; Barnes 90+2'	Report	Blake 15'	Stadium: QBE Stadium; Referee: Cory Mills

24 January 2016 9	Auckland City	4–2	Phoenix Premiers	Auckland
16:35 NZST	Moreira 11' (pen.), 21', 42'; De Vries 40'	Report	Cahill-Fleury 22', 78'	Stadium: Kiwitea Street; Referee: Hayden McCabe

30 January 2016 10	Canterbury United	3–1	Phoenix Premiers	Christchurch
16:15 NZST	White 29'; Clapham 44' de Jong 82'	Report	Singh 40'	Stadium: AMI Stadium; Referee: Nick Waldron

6 February 2016 11	Phoenix Premiers	0–2	Hawke's Bay United	Wellington
13:00 NZST		Report	Mason-Smith 6', 89'	Stadium: Newtown Park; Referee: Campbell-Kirk Waugh

13 February 2016 12	Phoenix Premiers	4–3	Southern United	Wellington
13:00 NZST	McGarry 2', 22', 33'; Khouchaba 37'	Report	French 12', 87'; Williams 48'	Stadium: David Farrington Park; Referee: Chris Kerr

20 February 2016 13	WaiBOP United	4–2	Phoenix Premiers	Mount Maunganui
13:00 NZST	Morris 26'; Hoyle 36', 43'; Ilich 83'	Report	Rogerson 64'; Whyte 89'	Stadium: Links Avenue; Referee: Nick Waldron

26 February 2016 14	Phoenix Premiers	1–6	Team Wellington	Wellington
16:15 NZST	McGarry 60'	Report	Villa 7'; Wood 23' (o.g.); Barcia 25', 48'; Jackson 83', 87'	Stadium: Westpac Stadium; Referee: John Rowbury
