= Albert Riera (footballer, born 1983) =

Spanish footballer and manager (born 1983)

Personal information
- Full name: Albert Riera Vidal
- Date of birth: 28 December 1983 (age 42)
- Place of birth: Barcelona, Spain
- Height: 1.73 m (5 ft 8 in)
- Position: Midfielder

Senior career*
Years	Team	Apps	(Gls)
2006–2007	Binéfar		
2007–2008	Atlético Monzón		
2008–2009	Balaguer		
2009–2010	Benavent		
2010	Mollerussa		
2011–2013	Auckland City	35	(1)
2013–2016	Wellington Phoenix	68	(0)
2016–2021	Auckland City	56	(0)
Total		159	(1)

Managerial career
- 2021: West Coast Rangers (assistant)
- 2021: West Coast Rangers
- 2021–2025: Auckland City
- 2025: Galaxy
- 2026: Christchurch United
- 2027–: Vanuatu United
- * Club domestic league appearances and goals as of 14 May 2021

Albert Riera Vidal (born 28 December 1983) is a Spanish professional football manager and former player who is the head coach of OFC Professional League club Vanuatu United. Riera spent the majority of his playing career in New Zealand, mainly appearing as a defensive midfielder for Auckland City in the New Zealand Football Championship and for Wellington Phoenix in the A-League.

== Playing career ==
Born in Barcelona, Catalonia, Riera played with local teams, at the beginning in Aragon (Binéfar and Atlético Monzón), and later in Catalonia (Balaguer, Benavent and Mollerussa).

=== Auckland City ===
Riera debuted with Auckland City on 21 February 2011, coming on as a substitute in the 73rd minute of a match against AS Magenta in the 2010–11 OFC Champions League. Riera and Auckland City went on to win the Champions League, with Riera coming on as a substitute in two games (against Magenta and against Waitakere United) and starting in two (against Tefana and against Amicale). In the 2010–11 New Zealand Football Championship Riera played in a total of five games, as well as the four games in the OFC Champions League.

In the 2011–12 season Riera played in 24 matches with Auckland City. Domestically, he played in 14 matches in the New Zealand Football Championship, in which Auckland City won the premiership, and in the ASB Charity Cup match against Waitakere United. Riera also played in all 8 matches of the OFC Champions League, in which he won the Golden Ball award for best player of the tournament, and played together with Auckland City in the FIFA Club World Cup, where they were eliminated in the first round, after losing to Kashiwa Reysol.

In the 2012–13 season Riera played in 26 matches with Auckland City. Domestically, he played in 16 matches in the New Zealand Football Championship, in which Auckland City took 2nd place, and in the ASB Charity Cup match against Waitakere United. Riera scored his first goal in the opening round of the domestic league against Canterbury United. Riera also played in 8 matches of the OFC Champions League, helping Auckland City win their fifth title of the competition, and their third consecutive title. Once again he played for Auckland City in the FIFA Club World Cup, where they were eliminated in the first round, after losing to Sanfrecce Hiroshima.

=== Wellington Phoenix ===
Riera was signed by Wellington Phoenix of the A-League on 7 October 2013, after they had played a pre-season friendly against Auckland City. He debuted for Wellington Phoenix in the opening match of the 2013–14 season against Brisbane Roar, coming on as a substitute in the 55th minute. Halfway through the season, he signed a year-long extension to his contract with Wellington Phoenix. Riera was named the Phoenix's player of the year for the 2013–14 season.

Riera announced his retirement on 21 May 2016.

=== Return to Auckland City ===
Riera's retirement was short lived, as he signed for his former club Auckland City for the 2016–17 New Zealand Football Championship season.

== Coaching career ==
He left Auckland City at the end of the 2020–21 season to take up a role as assistant manager of West Coast Rangers, newly formed to compete in the Northern League, along with former Auckland City teammate Ángel Berlanga. On 4 May 2021, after a poor start to the 2021 Northern League season, manager Chris Acott stepped down and was replaced by Riera; however, West Coast Rangers could not avoid relegation to NRFL Division 1.

On 1 December 2021, it was announced that Riera would return to Auckland City as their new manager for the 2022 Northern League season. On 21 January 2025, Riera stepped down as Auckland City manager.

On 1 June 2025, it was announced Riera would be taking over as Vanuatu side Galaxy as manager.

On 13 November 2025, Christchurch United announced Riera as their manager for the 2026 season. He was relieved of his duties after failing to automatically qualify for the restructured 2027 National League.

== Personal life ==
In October 2018, Riera became a New Zealand citizen.

== Career statistics ==
Club	Season	League			Cup		Continental		Other		Total	
Club	Season	Division	Apps	Goals	Apps	Goals	Apps	Goals	Apps	Goals	Apps	Goals
Auckland City	2010–11	NZ Premiership	2	0	—		4	0	3	0	9	0
Auckland City	2011–12	NZ Premiership	12	0	—		8	0	4	0	24	0
Auckland City	2012–13	NZ Premiership	13	1	—		8	1	5	0	26	2
Auckland City	Total		27	1	0	0	20	1	12	0	59	2
Wellington Phoenix	2013–14	A-League	17	0	—		—		—		17	0
Wellington Phoenix	2014–15	A-League	26	0	—		—		1	0	27	0
Wellington Phoenix	2015–16	A-League	24	0	—		—		—		24	0
Wellington Phoenix	Total		67	0	0	0	0	0	1	0	68	0
Auckland City	2016–17	NZ Premiership	14	0	—		6	0	3	0	23	0
Auckland City	2017–18	NZ Premiership	16	0	—		0	0	3	0	19	0
Auckland City	2018–19	NZ Premiership	5	0	—		4	0	1	0	10	0
Auckland City	2019–20	NZ Premiership	5	0	—		2	0	—		7	0
Auckland City	2020–21	NZ Premiership	11	0	—		—		0	0	11	0
Auckland City	Total		51	0	0	0	12	0	7	0	70	0
Career total			145	1	0	0	32	1	20	0	197	2

== Managerial statistics ==
As of match played 1 November 2025

Team	Nat	From	To	Record				
Team	Nat	From	To	G	W	D	L	Win %
West Coast Rangers	(New Zealand)	May 2021	November 2021	12	3	1	8	25.0
Auckland City	(New Zealand)	November 2021	21 January 2025	122	96	12	14	78.69
Galaxy	(Vanuatu)	1 June 2025	1 November 2025	5	4	1	0	80.00
Christchurch United	(New Zealand)	1 January 2026	present	0	0	0	0	—
Total				139	103	14	22	74.10

== Honours ==
=== Player ===
Auckland City

- New Zealand Football Championship Premiers: 2011–12
- ASB Charity Cup: 2011
- OFC Champions League: 2010–11, 2011–12, 2012–13
- A-League All Stars: 2014

Individual

- OFC Golden Ball: 2011–12

=== Manager ===
Auckland City

- OFC Champions League: 2022, 2023, 2024
- New Zealand National League: 2022, 2024
- Chatham Cup: 2022
- Northern League: 2022, 2023, 2024
