= Ross McKenzie =

Scottish-born New Zealand footballer

Personal information
- Date of birth: 16 March 1983 (age 43)
- Place of birth: Dundee, Scotland

College career
Years	Team	Apps	(Gls)
2002–2005	Akron Zips		

Senior career*
Years	Team	Apps	(Gls)
2006–2007	Auckland City FC		
2007	Waikato FC		
2007–2008	Sengkang Punggol		
2008–2009	Team Wellington		
2011–2012	Waitakere United	16	(1)
- * Club domestic league appearances and goals

Ross McKenzie (born 16 March 1983) is a New Zealand former footballer.

One of Sengkang Punggol's foreign imports listed for the 2007 S.League, McKenzie was said to have made a positive impact on the squad, recovering from an injury to the knee that season as well.

Slotted two goals in a 2–2 tie with Tampines Rovers in the semi-finals of the 2007 Singapore League Cup.

McKenzie played and scored for the New Zealand club Waitakere United in the 2012 O-League.
