= 2011 Solomon Islands Champions League Playoff =

Koloale	Solomon Warriors
3	2

First Leg
Koloale	Solomon Warriors
0	0
- Date: June 13, 2011
- Venue: Lawson Tama Stadium, Honiara

Second Leg
Solomon Warriors	Koloale
2	3
- Date: June 16, 2011
- Venue: Lawson Tama Stadium, Honiara

The 2011 Solomon Islands Champions League Playoff was a two-legged playoff for one spot in the 2011–12 OFC Champions League. The two teams that participated were Koloale, who won the 2010–11 Telekom S-League, and Solomon Warriors, who won the 2011 Knockout Championship. Koloale F.C. won and advanced to the Champions League.
