= Roihau Degage =

Tahitian footballer (born 1988)

Personal information
- Full name: Roihau Degage
- Date of birth: 12 December 1988 (age 37)
- Place of birth: Tahiti
- Position: Forward

Senior career*
Years	Team	Apps	(Gls)
2010–	AS Tefana		

International career
2012–	Tahiti	5	(2)
Medal record
Men's football
Representing Tahiti
OFC Nations Cup
Winner	2012 Solomon Islands
Men's Beach soccer
Representing Tahiti
OFC Beach Soccer Nations Cup
Third place	2009 Tahiti
- * Club domestic league appearances and goals

Roihau Degage is a Tahitian and a member of the Tahiti national football team currently playing for AS Tefana.

== International goals ==
#	Date	Venue	Opponent	Score	Result	Competition
1	3 June 2012	Lawson Tama Stadium, Honiara	New Caledonia	4-2	4-3	2012 OFC Nations Cup
2	22 September 2012	Stade Jean-Bouin, Issy-les-Moulineaux	Mayotte	1-3	1-3	2012 Coupe de l'Outre-Mer

== Honours ==
AS Tefana

- Tahiti First Division: 2010, 2011
- Tahiti Cup: 2010, 2011

Tahiti

- OFC Nations Cup: 2012
- OFC Beach Soccer Nations Cup: 3rd place, 2009

== International career statistics ==
Tahiti national team
Year	Apps	Goals
2012	5	2
Total	5	2
