= Troy Danaskos =

Australian professional footballer (born 1991)

Personal information
- Full name: Troy Danaskos
- Date of birth: 20 November 1991 (age 34)
- Place of birth: Australia
- Position: Left back

Team information
- Current team: St George FC

Youth career
- 2009–2011: Sydney Olympic

Senior career*
Years	Team	Apps	(Gls)
2012–2015	Sydney Olympic	80	(3)
2015–2016	Wellington Phoenix	6	(0)
2015–2016	Wellington Phoenix Reserves	6	(0)
2017	Bonnyrigg White Eagles	13	(1)
2017–2018	Marconi Stallions	21	(0)
2019	Sydney Olympic	3	(0)
2020–2022	St George City	50	(2)
2022–	St George FC	56	(15)
- * Club domestic league appearances and goals as of 25 August 2024 ‡ National team caps and goals as of 14 November 2015

Troy Danaskos (born 20 November 1991) is an Australian professional footballer who played as a defender for St George FC. He is currently the captain of the Saints.

His father Tony Danaskos played in the NSL for St George FC.
