= A.S. Tefana =

Tahitian football club

AS Tefana
- Full name: Association Sportive Tefana Football
- Founded: 1933
- Ground: Stade Louis Ganivet; Faʻaʻā, Tahiti, French Polynesia
- Capacity: 5,000
- Chairman: Thomas Flohr
- Manager: Xavier Samin
- League: Tahiti Ligue 1
- 2024–25: 3rd
Home colours	Away colours

Association Sportive Tefana Football, is a football club from Faʻaʻā, Tahiti, French Polynesia. The club plays their home matches at Stade Louis Ganivet. The club became the second French Polynesian team to have reached the final of the OFC Champions League, which they achieved in 2012.

== Recent seasons ==
In 2010 AS Tefana won the Tahitian Championship for the second time in their history, finishing third in the initial league table but won the Championship Play-off comfortably, finishing nine points ahead of their closest rivals. In the 2010–11 OFC Champions League, Tefana only won one game, over New Zealand's powerhouse Waitakere United.

In 2011, Tefana won their third championship with three rounds remaining. In their return to the O-League, the 2011–12 tournament begun with a record-breaking defeat of 0–10 to Waitakere United. Afterwards Tefana won all its games on the way to the finals, the best result by a Tahitian team since A.S. Pirae featured in the final of the 2006 OFC Club Championship. Auckland City FC wound up defeating Tefana at the 2012 OFC Champions League Final, with a 2–1 in Auckland and 1–0 in Faʻaʻā. They also won the Tahiti Cup, and qualified for the 2011–12 Coupe de France, where they were eliminated by Red Star 93.

In 2012, Tefana lost the Tahitian Championship to AS Dragon, but won the Tahiti Cup. On the 2012-13 Coupe de France, they were defeated by GSI Pontivy. The team also signed a three-year partnership with French Ligue 1 team AS Saint-Étienne.

== Achievements ==
- Tahiti First Division: 6

2005, 2010, 2011, 2015, 2016, 2023.

- Tahiti Cup: 7

2007, 2008, 2010, 2011, 2012, 2014, 2017.

- Tahiti Coupe des Champions: 3

2007, 2014, 2017.

- Coupe T.O.M: 1

2006.

=== Last seasons ===
Season	League/position
2012-13	2nd in Ligue 1. Tahiti Cup runners-up.
2013-14	2nd in Ligue 1. Tahiti Cup champions.
2014-15	1st in Ligue 1. Qualified to OFC Champions League. Group stage at OFC Champions League. 7th Round of Coupe de France. Tahiti Cup runners-up.
2015-16	1st in Ligue 1. Qualified to OFC Champions League. Quarter finals of Tahiti Cup.
2016-17	1st in Ligue 1 - Lost championship playoff. Semifinals of OFC Champions League. Tahiti Cup champions.
2017-18	2nd in Ligue 1 - Qualified to OFC Champions League. 7th Round of Coupe de France. Semifinals of Tahiti Cup.
2018-19	3rd in Ligue 1. Tahiti Cup runners-up.
2019-20	5th in Ligue 1. Group stage at OFC Champions League. Round 1 of Tahiti Cup.

== Performance in OFC competitions ==
- OFC Champions League: 3 appearances

2015: –
2012: Finalist
2011: 4° in Group B

OFC Men's Champions League results
Season	Round	Club	Home	Away	Aggregate

Season	Round	Club	Result
2010–11	Group B	(New Zealand) Waitakere United	1–3
2010–11	Group B	(New Caledonia) Magenta	0–1
2010–11	Group B	(New Zealand) Auckland City	1–1
2010–11	Group B	(New Zealand) Waitakere United	3–1
2010–11	Group B	(New Caledonia) Magenta	0–3
2010–11	Group B	(New Zealand) Auckland City	0–5
2011–12	Group A	(New Zealand) Waitakere United	0–10
2011–12	Group A	(New Caledonia) Mont-Dore	1–1
2011–12	Group A	(Fiji) Ba F.C.	4–1
2011–12	Group A	(New Zealand) Waitakere United	3–0
2011–12	Group A	(New Caledonia) Mont-Dore	2–0
2011–12	Group A	(Fiji) Ba F.C.	5–0
2011–12	Final	(New Zealand) Auckland City	1–2
2011–12	Final	(New Zealand) Auckland City	0–1
2014–15	Group C	(New Zealand) Team Wellington	0–3
2014–15	Group C	(Vanuatu) Tafea	1–1
2014–15	Group C	(Papua New Guinea) Hekari United	2–3
2016	Group C	(Fiji) Nadi F.C.	6–1
2016	Group C	(New Caledonia) Magenta	2–4
2016	Group C	(Samoa) Kiwi F.C.	7–0
2016	Semi	(New Zealand) Auckland City	2–4
2017	Group D	(Vanuatu) Erakor Golden Star	2–4
2017	Group D	(Fiji) Rewa	2–0
2017	Group D	(Solomon Islands) Marist	2–2
2017	Semi	(New Zealand) Auckland City	0–2
2017	Semi	(New Zealand) Auckland City	0–2
2019	Group A	(Papua New Guinea) Toti City Dwellers	3–3
2019	Group A	(New Caledonia) Hienghène Sport	0–1
2019	Group A	(Vanuatu) Malampa Revivors F.C.	3–3
