= James Pritchett (footballer) =

New Zealand footballer (born 1982)

Personal information
- Full name: James Keith Pritchett
- Date of birth: 1 July 1982 (age 44)
- Place of birth: Watford, England
- Height: 1.78 m (5 ft 10 in)
- Position: Defender

Senior career*
Years	Team	Apps	(Gls)
2001	Aberdeen FC		
2003	Football Kingz	13	(0)
2004	Cambridge United		
2005–2011	Auckland City FC	44	
2011	Khonkaen FC		
2012–2015	Auckland City FC		

International career
1999	New Zealand U-17		
2003–2004	New Zealand U-19		
2006–2008	New Zealand	6	(0)
- * Club domestic league appearances and goals

James Keith Pritchett (born 1 July 1982 in Watford, England) is an association football player who represented New Zealand as a defender at both age group and senior international level. He is the son of former New Zealand manager Keith Pritchett.

His senior career included one season with the Football Kingz, New Zealand's professional franchise in the Australian NSL He represented Auckland City FC at the 2006 FIFA Club World Cup, where they lost against Al Ahly and Jeonbuk Hyundai.

Pritchett was included in the New Zealand under-17 side for the 1999 FIFA under-17 World Cup hosted by New Zealand, appearing in all three group games. He also represented New Zealand at under-23 level in New Zealand's failed bid to qualify for the 2004 Olympics.

Pritchett went on to make his full All Whites début in a 2–1 win over Malaysia on 23 February 2006 and has six A-international caps to his credit.
