= Stade Louis Ganivet =

Multi-use stadium in Faaa, Tahiti, French Polynesia

- Stade Louis Ganivet
- Interactive map of Stade Louis Ganivet
- Full name: Stade Louis Ganivet
- Location: Faaa, Tahiti
- Coordinates: 17.5576°S 149.5947°W
- Capacity: 5,000

Tenant
- AS Tefana

Stade Louis Ganivet is a multi-use stadium in Faaa, Tahiti, in French Polynesia. It is currently used mostly for football matches and hosts the home matches of AS Tefana of the Tahiti Division Fédérale. The stadium holds 5,000 spectators.
