= Adam McGeorge =

New Zealand footballer (born 1989)

Personal information
- Full name: Adam Jamie McGeorge
- Date of birth: 30 March 1989 (age 37)
- Place of birth: Rotorua, New Zealand
- Height: 1.81 m (5 ft 11 in)
- Position: Midfielder

Team information
- Current team: Unicorns FC

Youth career
- Auckland City

Senior career*
Years	Team	Apps	(Gls)
2008–2012	Auckland City	48	(6)
2012–2013	Team Wellington	8	(1)
2013	Auckland City	0	(0)
2014	Waitakere United	5	(0)
2014	Central United		
2015–2016	Auckland City	7	(0)
2017–2018	Romford	9	(0)
2019–	Kiwi FC	8	(2)

International career^{‡}
- New Zealand U-15
2008	New Zealand U-20	2	(1)
2012	New Zealand U-23	7	(0)
2012–	New Zealand	2	(0)
- * Club domestic league appearances and goals as of 13 April 2018 ‡ National team caps and goals as of 31 July 2012

Adam Jamie McGeorge (born 30 March 1989) is a New Zealand footballer who plays as a midfielder for Auckland City in the New Zealand Football Championship.

== Club career ==
After a successful stint at Auckland City, McGeorge made a surprise move south to join Team Wellington in October 2012.

In 2019, McGeorge made his long-awaited return to the footballing world when he signed a one-year deal with FC Lahore. McGeorge made his debut against The Rams in April and scored one of Lahore's six goals on the day. Later in the season, he would go on to win man of the match in a memorable 2–0 win against F-Team. All good things must, however, come to an end, and Lahore announced that McGeorge would be leaving the club to join Montreal Impact in January 2020. A testimonial was planned for December 2019 but was ultimately postponed due to unforeseen circumstances.

== International career ==
In May 2012 McGeorge and then Auckland City teammate Ian Hogg received call ups to the senior national side for friendlies versus El Salvador, Honduras and for the 2012 OFC Nations Cup. McGeorge made his All Whites debut versus Honduras coming on a late substitute in his side's 1–0 win.

In mid-2012 McGeorge was named in the New Zealand Olympic Football team for London 2012. McGeorge featured in the Oly-Whites' opening game in at the tournament, a 1–0 loss to Belarus in Coventry, replacing Adam Thomas for the last 13 minutes. The team were eliminated in the group stage.

=== International goals and caps ===
New Zealand's goal tally first.

International appearances and goals
#	Date	Venue	Opponent	Result	Competition	Goal	Match Report
2012
1	26 May	Cotton Bowl Stadium, Dallas	Honduras	1–0	International Match		NZ Football (archived)
2	6 June	Lawson Tama Stadium, Honiara	Solomon Islands	1–1	2012 OFC Nations Cup		NZ Football (archived)

=== International career statistics ===
New Zealand national team
Year	Apps	Goals
2012	2	0
Total	2	0

=== Career ===
Adam joined Aon Risk Services in Auckland in late 2013 to support his professional football career. In March 2014 he transferred internally within Aon and joined the Construction team which specialises in insurance for contractors and principals to construction projects.
