= Axel Williams =

Tahitian footballer (born 1983)

Personal information
- Full name: Axel Williams
- Date of birth: 3 December 1983 (age 42)
- Place of birth: Tahiti
- Position: Forward

Senior career*
Years	Team	Apps	(Gls)
2005–2010	AS Pirae		
2010–2014	AS Tefana		
2015–2022	AS Pirae		

International career^{‡}
2007–2022	Tahiti	12	(2)
- * Club domestic league appearances and goals ‡ National team caps and goals as of 15:47, 16 December 2015 (UTC)

Axel Williams (born 3 December 1983 in Pirae) is a Tahitian footballer currently playing for AS Tefana.

== Career ==
=== Club ===
Williams started his professional career 2005 with AS Pirae. After five years left Piraé and joined to AS Tefana, who played in the 2011/2012 season in the O-League.

=== International ===
Williams is since 2007 a member of the Tahiti national football team. He played in twelve games and scored two goals.

==== International goals ====
#	Date	Venue	Opponent	Score	Result	Competition
1	29 August 2007	Toleafoa J.S. Blatter Complex, Apia	Tuvalu	1-0	1-1	2007 Pacific Games
2	29 September 2010	Stade Langrenay, Longjumeau	New Caledonia	1-1	1-1	2010 Coupe de l'Outre-Mer

== International career statistics ==
Tahiti national team
Year	Apps	Goals
2007	4	1
2010	3	1
2012	5	0
Total	12	2
