= Fenedy Masauvakalo =

Vanuatuan footballer

Personal information
- Date of birth: 4 November 1984 (age 42)
- Place of birth: Vanuatu
- Position: Forward

Team information
- Current team: Tupuji Imere
- Number: 10

Senior career*
| Years | Team | Apps | (Gls) |
| 2006–2007 | Tupuji Imere | | |
| 2007–2010 | Mitchelton SC | | |
| 2010–2014 | Amicale | | (6) |
| 2014 | Central Sport | | |
| 2014–2017 | Amicale | | |
| 2017 | Central Sport | | |
| 2017– | Tupuji Imere | | |

International career^{‡}
| 2007– | Vanuatu | 15 | (2) |
Medal record
Men's football
Representing Vanuatu
Pacific Games
| Bronze medal – third place | 2007 Samoa |
- * Club domestic league appearances and goals as of 19 September 2017 ‡ National team caps and goals as of 4 June 2016

Fenedy Masauvakalo (born 4 November 1984), is a Vanuatuan footballer and a striker that plays for Vanuatu. He is currently the national team's captain.

== International career ==
He scored against Fiji in a 3–2 away win during 2018 Oceanian World Cup Qualification.

=== International goals ===
As of match played 4 June 2016. Vanuatu score listed first, score column indicates score after each Masauvakalo goal.

International goals by date, venue, cap, opponent, score, result and competition
| No. | Date | Venue | Cap | Opponent | Score | Result | Competition |
|---|---|---|---|---|---|---|---|
| 1 | 26 March 2016 | Port Vila Municipal Stadium, Port Vila, Vanuatu | 12 | New Caledonia | 1–1 | 2–1 | Friendly |
| 2 | 4 June 2016 | Sir John Guise Stadium, Port Moresby, Papua New Guinea | 15 | Fiji | 2–0 | 3–2 | 2016 OFC Nations Cup |

== Honours ==
Vanuatu

- Pacific Games: Bronze Medalist, 2007
