= Sean Lovemore =

New Zealand footballer

Personal information
- Full name: Sean Naohiko Patrick Lovemore
- Date of birth: 8 June 1992 (age 34)
- Place of birth: Auckland, New Zealand
- Height: 1.80 m (5 ft 11 in)
- Position: Striker

Senior career*
Years	Team	Apps	(Gls)
2010–2012	Waitakere United	8	(1)
2011	→ Wellington Phoenix (loan)	1	(0)
2012–2015	Hawke's Bay United	41	(24)
2015–2016	Waitakere United	14	(8)
2016	Oakleigh Cannons	10	(3)
2016–2017	Eastern Suburbs	16	(6)
2017–2019	Onehunga Sports		
2020–	Auckland United		

International career^{‡}
2011	New Zealand U-20	5	(0)
2012	New Zealand U-23	4	(3)
- * Club domestic league appearances and goals as of 24 April 2020 ‡ National team caps and goals as of 24 April 2020

Sean Naohiko Patrick Lovemore (born 8 June 1992) is a New Zealand footballer who currently plays for Auckland United in the NRFL Premier.

== Club career ==
Lovemore was educated at Macleans College. After high school, he started playing for Waitakere United and on 8 February 2011 he was signed on loan by A-League club Wellington Phoenix. Lovemore made his professional debut in the A-League on 9 February 2011 in a round 26 clash against Sydney FC coming off the bench in the 65th minute of the game in a 2–0 loss.

== International career ==
In 2011 Lovemore travelled with the New Zealand under 20 side to the 2011 FIFA U-20 World Cup in Colombia where he made two appearances.

== A-League career statistics ==
All-Time Club Performances
Club	Season	NZFC		Club World Cup		Oceania		Total
Club	Season	App	Goals	App	Goals	App	Goals	App	Goals
Waitakere United (NZFC)	2010–11	8	1			2	1	10	2
Waitakere United (NZFC)	Club Total	8	1			2	1	10	2
Club	Season	A-League		Finals Series		Asia		Total
Club	Season	App	Goals	App	Goals	App	Goals	App	Goals
Wellington Phoenix F.C. (A-League)	2010–11	1	0					1	0
Wellington Phoenix F.C. (A-League)	Club Total	1	0					1	0
Career totals		9	1			2	1	11	2
Last updated 21 May 2011
