= Chris Kerr (referee) =

New Zealand football referee

- Full name: Christopher Simon Kerr
- Born: 2 September 1976 (age 50); Irvine, Scotland
- Other occupation: Systems Engineer

Domestic
Years	League	Role
2006–2017	ISPS Handa Premiership	Referee

International
Years	League	Role
2012	FIFA listed	Referee

Chris Kerr (born 2 September 1976) is a retired FIFA referee, from Auckland, New Zealand. He officiated on the ISPS Handa Premiership, the national football competition of New Zealand, and is also a former OFC Champions League referee in the Oceania Football Confederation. His occupation is as a Systems Engineer.

== Career ==
Kerr first took up refereeing in 1991 at the age of 14 in his home town of New Plymouth. In 2006, he became a referee on the New Zealand Football Championship. In 2009, he officiated his first OFC Champions League match between Marist FC (Solomon Islands) and Lautoka F.C. (Fiji) in Honiara. Since then, he has refereed further OFC Champions League games and was a match official at the South Pacific Games in 2011 refereeing his first international. In 2012, he was promoted to the FIFA list as a referee and nominated for New Zealand Footballs' Referee of the year.

Kerr was appointed as a match official at OFC Nations Cup, which served as round 2 of qualification for the 2014 FIFA World Cup in Brazil for the OFC region. He officiated the match between Tahiti and New Caledonia.

Kerr came off the FIFA referee list at the start of 2013 due to being unavailable

In 2014, Kerr was the referee for the Chatham Cup Final at North Harbour Stadium between Central United and Cashmere Technical
