= Manel Expósito =

Spanish footballer

Personal information
- Full name: Manel Expósito Presseguer
- Date of birth: 29 November 1981 (age 44)
- Place of birth: Barcelona, Spain
- Height: 1.76 m (5 ft 9 in)
- Position: Forward

Senior career*
Years	Team	Apps	(Gls)
199x-2000	UE Vic		
2000–2001	CE Júpiter		
2001–2003	UE Sant Andreu		
2003–2005	FC Barcelona B	36	(5)
2005–2006	Atlético Madrid C		
2006–2007	AD Alcorcón	13	(1)
2007	UE Figueres	16	(5)
2007–2008	Benidorm CF	32	(4)
2008–2010	UDA Gramenet	51	(8)
2010	CF Atlético Ciudad	13	(3)
2010	AD Cerro de Reyes	13	(1)
2010–2013	Auckland City FC	37	(25)
2013–2015	K.A.S. Eupen	20	(2)

Managerial career
- 2015–2021: Eupen (assistant)
- 2023–2024: OH Leuven (assistant)
- 2025: Guadalajara (assistant)
- 2025-: CSKA Moscow (assistant)
- * Club domestic league appearances and goals

Manel Exposito Presseguer (born 29 November 1981) is a Spanish retired footballer who now works as an assistant coach at CSKA Moscow.

== Career ==
Exposito started his senior career with UE Vic. In 2013, he signed for K.A.S. Eupen in the Belgian First Division B, where he made twenty-four appearances and scored two goals before retiring in 2015.
