= Faʼaʼā =

Commune in French Polynesia, France

- Commune
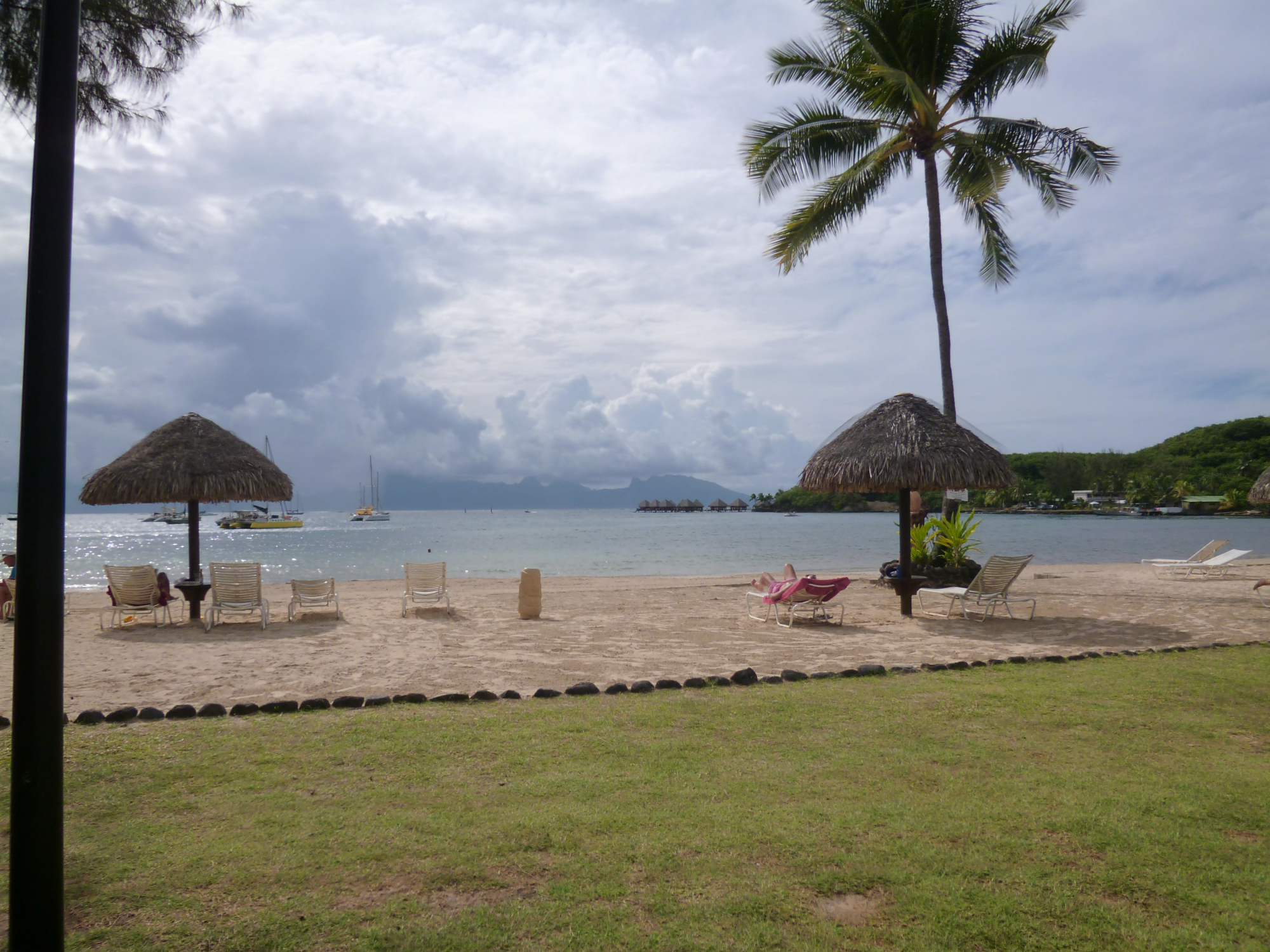
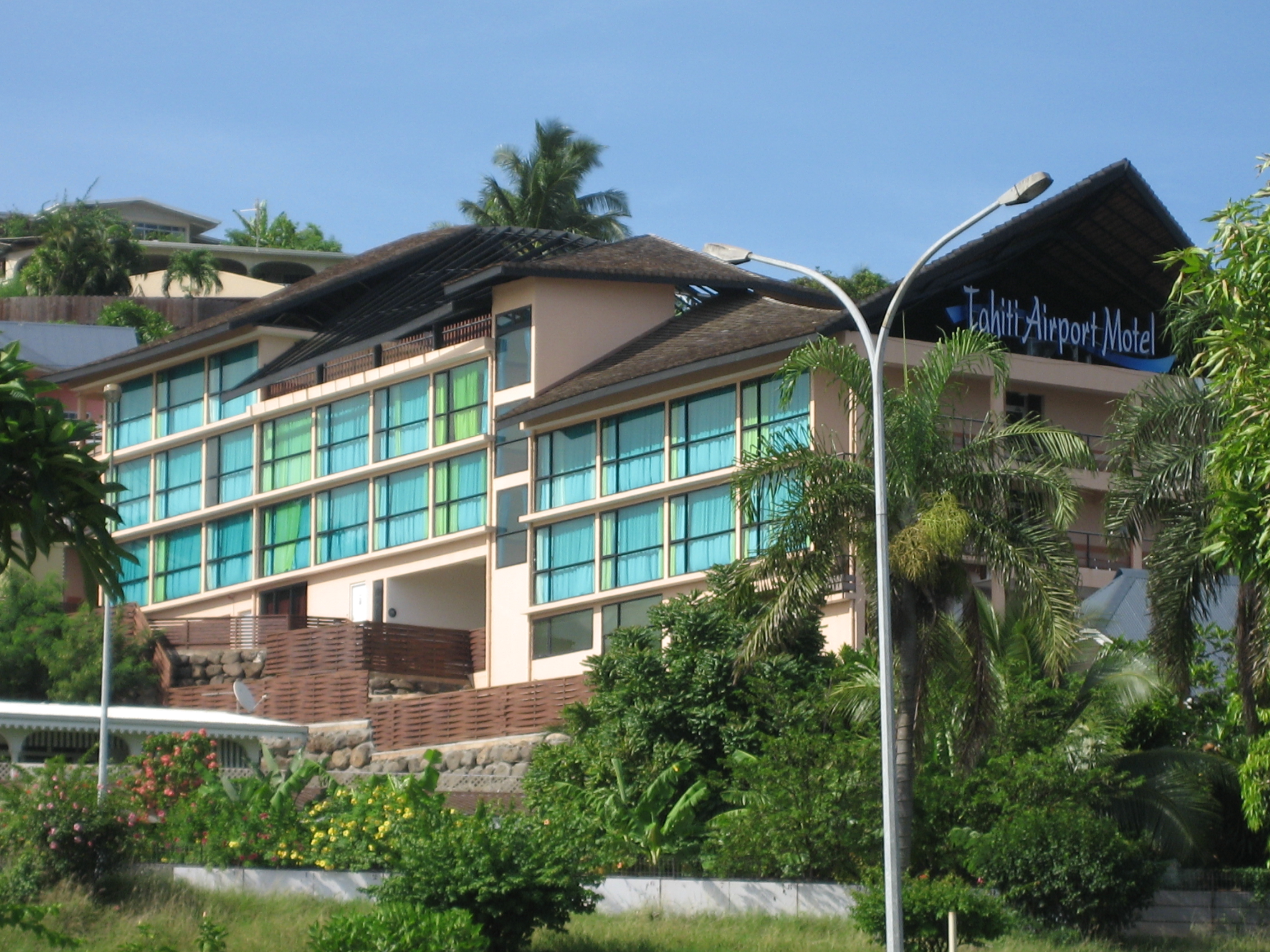
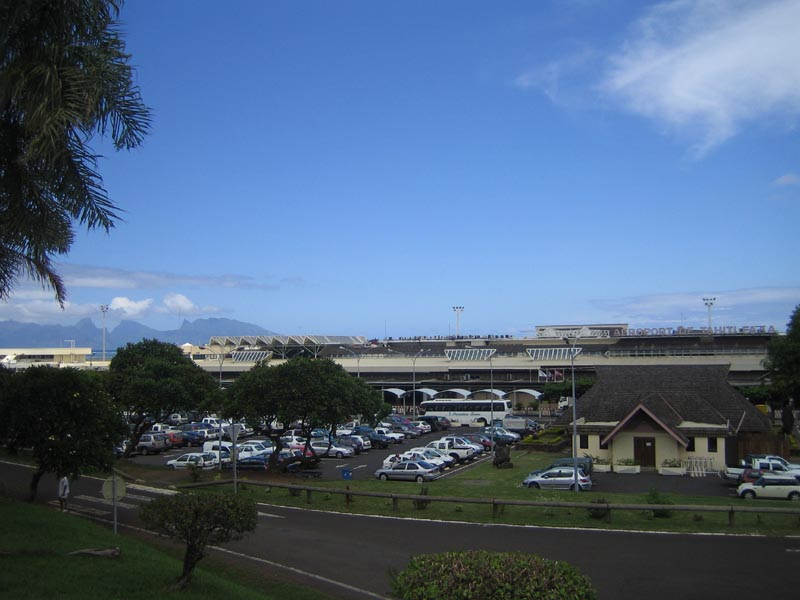
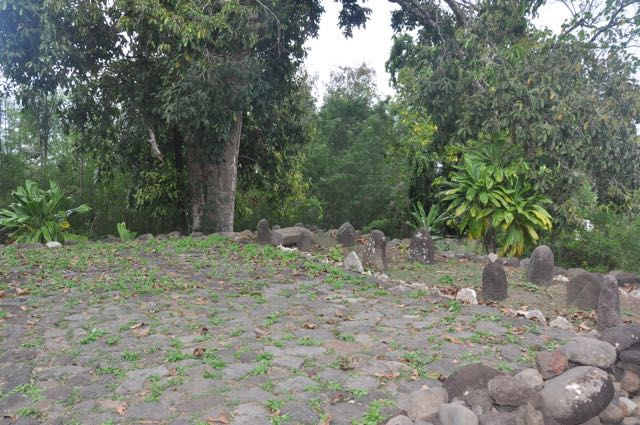
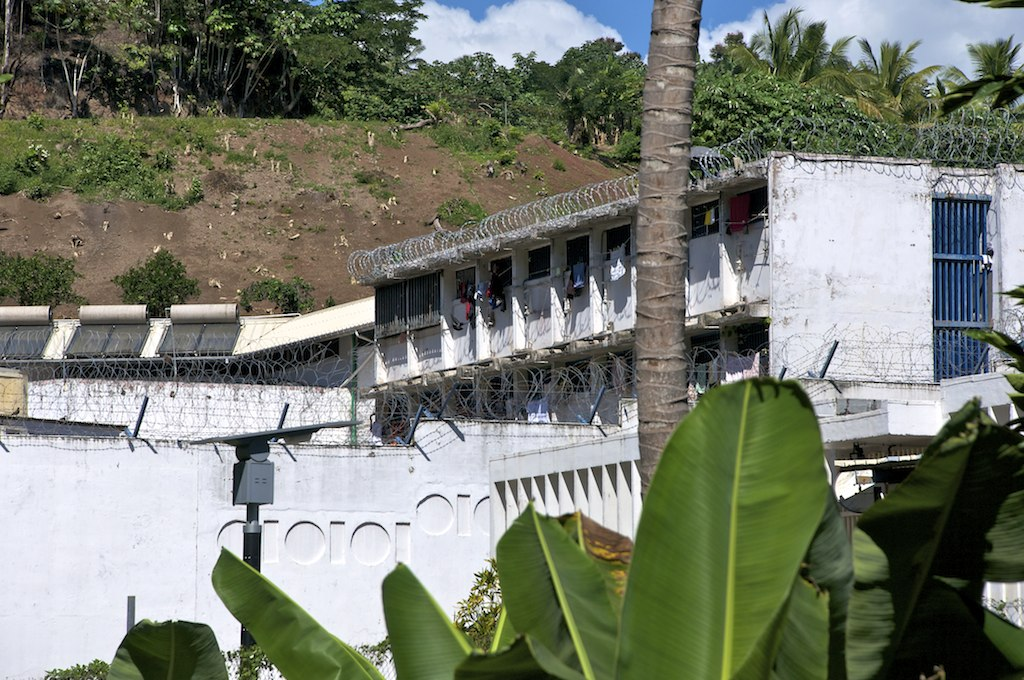
- Coastline of Faʼaʼā Tahiti Airport Hotel Faa'a International Airport Marae Taumata Faʼaʼā-Nuutania Prison

- Location of the commune (in red) within the Windward Islands
- Location of Faʼaʼā
- Coordinates: 17°33′04″S 149°35′51″W
- Country: France
- Overseas collectivity: French Polynesia
- Subdivision: Windward Islands

Government
  - Mayor (2020–2026): Oscar Temaru
- Area^{1}: 34.2 km^{2} (13.2 sq mi)
- Elevation: 7 m (23 ft)
- Highest elevation: 1,493 m (4,898 ft)
- Lowest elevation: 0 m (0 ft)
- Population (2022): 29,826
  - Density: 872/km^{2} (2,260/sq mi)
- Time zone: UTC−10:00
- INSEE/Postal code: 98715 /98704
- ^{1} French Land Register data, which excludes lakes, ponds, glaciers > 1 km^{2} (0.386 sq mi or 247 acres) and river estuaries.

Faʼaʼā (Note: Pronounced [faʔaˈʔaː], spelled also Faaa, Faaʼā or Fa'ā.) is a commune in the suburbs of Papeʼete in French Polynesia, an overseas country of France in the Pacific Ocean. Faʼaʼā is located on the island of Tahiti, in the administrative subdivision of the Windward Islands, themselves part of the Society Islands. At the 2022 census Faʼaʼā had a population of 29,826, making it the most populous commune on Tahiti and in French Polynesia. Faʼaʼā has many mountains inland that can reach 1,500 m (5,000 ft). Mount Marau is an extinct volcano in the inland limits and can be seen from nearby Moʼorea. The area of Faʼaʼā is 9 m (30 ft) above mean sea level on average.

Faʼaʼā has a long history. Captain James Cook landed on Faʼaʼā when he came to Tahiti in 1769 on his first expedition to the Pacific. The commune is the political stronghold of independence leader Oscar Temaru who has served three times as president.

== Demographics ==
In 1988 Faʼaʼā overtook Papeʼete as the most populated commune in the urban area of Papeʼete and in French Polynesia. Despite this change in population, the urban area as a whole is named Papeʼete and Faʼaʼā is still considered a suburb, due to Papeʼete's historical importance and its status as administrative capital of French Polynesia. The Papeʼete Urban Area has a population of about 130,000.

Historical population
Year	Pop.	±%
2002	28,182	—
2007	29,851	+5.9%
2012	29,719	−0.4%
2017	29,506	−0.7%
2022	29,826	+1.1%

== Politics ==
The municipality of Faʼaʼā is administered by a 35-member municipal council, headed by a mayor assisted by 10 deputies. The council regulates the affairs of the commune through its deliberations and responds to the wishes of its population through the services of the town hall, which has five directorates headed by a general directorate.

=== List of mayors of Fa'a'ā ===
- Francis Sanford (1965–1977)
- Alfred Helme (1977–1983)
- Oscar Temaru (1983–present)

== Transportation ==
=== Air ===
Faa'a International Airport is located in the north of Faʼaʼā commune, some 5 km (3.1 mi) southwest of the center of Papeʼete. The airport is the only international airport in French Polynesia. Travellers from other islands must come to this airport for international flights. Some of the international flights from the airport go to Los Angeles, California; Tokyo, Japan; and Auckland, New Zealand. The airport is easily accessible from downtown Faʼaʼā. Airport shuttles and Tahiti buses come to the parking lot. There are coconut trees and a Tiki in the parking lot. Flowers from local farms are sent to the airport to be given to arriving passengers.

=== Freeways and roads ===
Tahiti's West Coast freeway runs through the commune from Papeʼete to Teahupoʼo. There are many other roads in Faʼaʼā. The Tahiti transportation bus runs around the Papeʼete area. There is little road traffic in Faʼaʼā. There are bridges over the many canals and small rivers that flow through Faʼaʼā. Most of the streets are paved.

== Location and geography ==
Faʼaʼā is located in northwestern Tahiti. Just 6 kilometers (4 mi) south of the town center of Papeʼete, the runway for Faʼaʼā International Airport is built on coral reef since there is limited flat land. There is a slight bay south of the airport where the roads and freeways move inland. Downtown Faʼaʼā is about 6 m (20 ft) above mean sea level. Faʼaʼā is in northwestern French Polynesia. The Papenoʼo River is fairly close. Faʼaʼā extends inland about 15 km (9 mi). Mount Orohena is in the mountains of Faʼaʼā. The mountain is the highest point in French Polynesia at 2,200 m (7,300 ft). Tahiti Iti is just to the southeast of the commune. Moʼorea, which is Tahiti's sister island, is located just 15 km (9.3 mi) across the Pacific Ocean. Many people can see Mount Tohivea which is the tallest mountain on Moʼorea at nearly 1,200 m (4,000 ft). Los Angeles, California is located 6,616 km (4,111 mi) northeast, Santiago, Chile is 3,400 km (2,100 mi) east, Faʼaʼā Sydney, Australia is located 3,200 km (2,000 mi) west. Easter Island is not too far east of Faʼaʼā. There are some viewpoints in Faʼaʼā to see Moʼorea. Moʼorea appears as a gray mound with mountains across the Pacific Ocean. The Faʼaʼā Nature Park is a major park in the mountains. New Caledonia is located not too far to the west of Faʼaʼā.

=== Nearby communes ===
Moʼorea-Maiao on Moʼorea is located just across the Pacific Ocean 15 km (9.3 mi) away. Vaitape, Bora Bora is 218 km (135 mi) away and is the largest commune of Bora Bora. Uturoa is a closer commune on Raiatea. Papeʼete borders Faʼaʼā on the north and Paperā borders Faʼaʼā on the south.

== Climate ==
Faʼaʼā lies in a tropical monsoon climate zone and thus experiences very little seasonal variation.

Cyclones have struck Faʼaʼā about 10 times, causing major damage to the neighborhoods low and flat. Houses flipped over and some flooding took place in downtown Faʼaʼā . The surges were about 9 m (29 ft) tall.

Comparison of local Meteorological data with other cities in France
Town	Sunshine (hours/yr)	Rain (mm/yr)	Snow (days/yr)	Storm (days/yr)	Fog (days/yr)
National average	1,973	770	14	22	40
Faʼaʼā	2,660.4	1,687.7	0	36.9	0.1
Paris	1,661	637	12	18	10
Nice	2,724	767	1	29	1
Strasbourg	1,693	665	29	29	56
Brest	1,605	1,211	7	12	75

Climate data for Faʼaʼā (1991−2020 normals, extremes 1957−present)
Month	Jan	Feb	Mar	Apr	May	Jun	Jul	Aug	Sep	Oct	Nov	Dec	Year
Record high °C (°F)	34.1 (93.4)	34.5 (94.1)	34.5 (94.1)	34.5 (94.1)	33.3 (91.9)	32.7 (90.9)	31.9 (89.4)	31.6 (88.9)	31.7 (89.1)	32.4 (90.3)	33.9 (93.0)	33.2 (91.8)	34.5 (94.1)
Mean daily maximum °C (°F)	31.0 (87.8)	31.1 (88.0)	31.5 (88.7)	31.3 (88.3)	30.4 (86.7)	29.6 (85.3)	29.2 (84.6)	29.0 (84.2)	29.3 (84.7)	29.7 (85.5)	30.4 (86.7)	30.6 (87.1)	30.3 (86.5)
Daily mean °C (°F)	27.7 (81.9)	27.8 (82.0)	28.1 (82.6)	27.9 (82.2)	27.0 (80.6)	26.1 (79.0)	25.6 (78.1)	25.4 (77.7)	25.8 (78.4)	26.3 (79.3)	27.2 (81.0)	27.5 (81.5)	26.9 (80.4)
Mean daily minimum °C (°F)	24.4 (75.9)	24.5 (76.1)	24.7 (76.5)	24.5 (76.1)	23.6 (74.5)	22.6 (72.7)	22.1 (71.8)	21.9 (71.4)	22.3 (72.1)	23.0 (73.4)	23.9 (75.0)	24.3 (75.7)	23.5 (74.3)
Record low °C (°F)	19.5 (67.1)	18.9 (66.0)	20.5 (68.9)	19.2 (66.6)	18.8 (65.8)	15.9 (60.6)	16.3 (61.3)	14.9 (58.8)	15.8 (60.4)	15.8 (60.4)	18.1 (64.6)	19.5 (67.1)	14.9 (58.8)
Average precipitation mm (inches)	267.6 (10.54)	244.5 (9.63)	166.5 (6.56)	99.2 (3.91)	104.1 (4.10)	74.5 (2.93)	44.1 (1.74)	41.3 (1.63)	50.1 (1.97)	102.7 (4.04)	105.1 (4.14)	279.1 (10.99)	1,578.8 (62.16)
Average precipitation days (≥ 1.0 mm)	12.8	12.1	9.6	8.1	7.5	5.1	4.5	4.7	4.5	7.0	8.3	14.1	98.2
Mean monthly sunshine hours	209.9	188.0	228.7	223.2	223.3	221.4	237.6	240.6	232.1	232.6	224.1	199.0	2,660.4
Source: Météo-France

== Education ==
The University of French Polynesia is in central Faʼaʼā. Students from many other islands come to this university since it is the only one in the territory. It is a relatively small university with around 2,000 students. There are elementary, middle, and high schools located inland in the neighborhoods. Most of the schools are in separate buildings, each of them being one class. There are about five classes per grade at elementary schools. Some families have their children go to school in other countries like the United States or New Zealand. If they were to have their students go to California for education, they would usually go to the University of California, Los Angeles in Los Angeles. The main subject at the schools in Faʼaʼā is mathematics.

== History of Faʼaʼā ==
=== Early settlers ===
Faʼaʼā was first settled by travelers from Asia who arrived in canoes in the year 700. At that time, the settlers from Asia made small houses from grass and wood. Faʼaʼā had only 400 residents. They fished from the beach and from their canoes. The settlers made spears from the charcoal on the beach. Soon, many more settlers came from Asia, swelling the population to 700 by the year 1220. Some of the people fed on breadfruit and bananas from banana trees. The settlers kept moving inland from the beach. They looked across the ocean and saw Moʼorea, which had also been settled. Some of the settlers on Tahiti paddled their canoes to visit Moʼorea. By 1300, Faʼaʼā had about 1,000 residents. Faʼaʼā had many grass houses along the beach, many close to one another. Some of the residents left open spaces to let their kids play. Some of the early Tahitians made small fires from leaves to stay warm during winter. By the 1330s, 1,300 residents had settled in Faʼaʼā. Most of the settlers moved their houses inland as the beachfront was flooded during cyclones and high tides. The Tahitians moved into the small valleys close to Mount Orohena. Many of the early Polynesians had canoed to Moʼorea and back many times. They had been careful of the many stonefish in the water.

=== European contact ===
European settlers came during the 1500s. In 1769 Captain James Cook became the third European visitor to Tahiti. The Tahitians were all wondering who he was and why he was here. Then he left Tahiti and went exploring other islands in the Pacific Ocean. He later reached New Zealand and the eastern coast of Australia. Then Charles Darwin came on his expedition to Tahiti. During the late 1800s, Faʼaʼā had a population of 2,000 residents. Some of the residents went to California to go to the California Gold Rush to search for a new life. Faʼaʼā was part of the Kingdom of Tahiti until the annexation of 1880. Many buildings made from wood were along the coast of Faʼaʼā. Some small markets selling bananas and other fruits were busy. Residents from Moʼorea came to get fruits from the markets. Farms could be found in the mountains of Faʼaʼā.

=== Modern Faʼaʼā ===
During the early 1900s, Faʼaʼā's population had grown to 5,000. Many markets had more choices and even some toys for kids. Some bigger boats were made for the new Faʼaʼā Port. The boats sailed from Faʼaʼā onward to other communes on Tahiti such as Arue and Teahupoʼo. Downtown Faʼaʼā was very busy and public beaches were formed on the waterfront of Faʼaʼā. There was a big field in the north of Faʼaʼā and Faʼaʼā International Airport was built here in 1962. One of the first airplanes was Air Tahiti, which first went to other islands in French Polynesia. The international airlines such as Air Tahiti Nui were incorporated in the late 1990s. Air Moʼorea runs several flights daily between Tahiti and Moʼorea. In 2007 one flight crashed into the lagoon and 20 people died. Don the Beachcomber lived here part of his life. The Moʼorea ferry was also created after the flight and still sails to Moʼorea each day. Today, Faʼaʼā has a population of nearly 30,000 inhabitants.

=== Dates ===
700
The area of Faʼaʼā is first settled by early Polynesians
900
Faʼaʼā has many grass houses along the beach and inland
1600
Faʼaʼā's population grows to 1,500
1767
Captain Samuel Wallis is the first European to land on Tahiti
1768
Louis-Antoine de Bougainville is the second European to land on Tahiti
1769
Captain James Cook is the third European to land on Tahiti
1855
Many Faʼaʼā residents leave for the California Gold Rush
1910
Faʼaʼā has more than 5,000 residents
1962
Faʼaʼā International Airport opened
1998
Air Tahiti Nui is founded
2007
Air Moʼorea crashes while going to Moʼorea

== Parks and recreation ==
There is one long coastal beach park with 3 playgrounds per kilometer and concrete spaces where Tahitian dancers perform. Coconut trees dot the coastline and can be up to 12 metres (40 ft) tall. There are many more parks in the neighborhoods of Faʼaʼā. The usual park in Faʼaʼā has a playground, open grass spaces, and trees and only a few have Basketball courts. School parks have mainly open grass spaces and a few trees. There are about 170 parks in Faʼaʼā. Hiking trails can be found in the mountains of Tahiti. It is part of the Faʼaʼā Nature Park. There are viewing points viewing the Papeʼete Area. The harbor can also be seen with the Aremiti Ferry coming in and out of the harbor. Mape trees grow in the park. The hiking trails are made of dirt and are 1.2 m (4 ft) wide. There are also hiking trails in nearby communes of Tahiti and Moʼorea.

== Economy ==
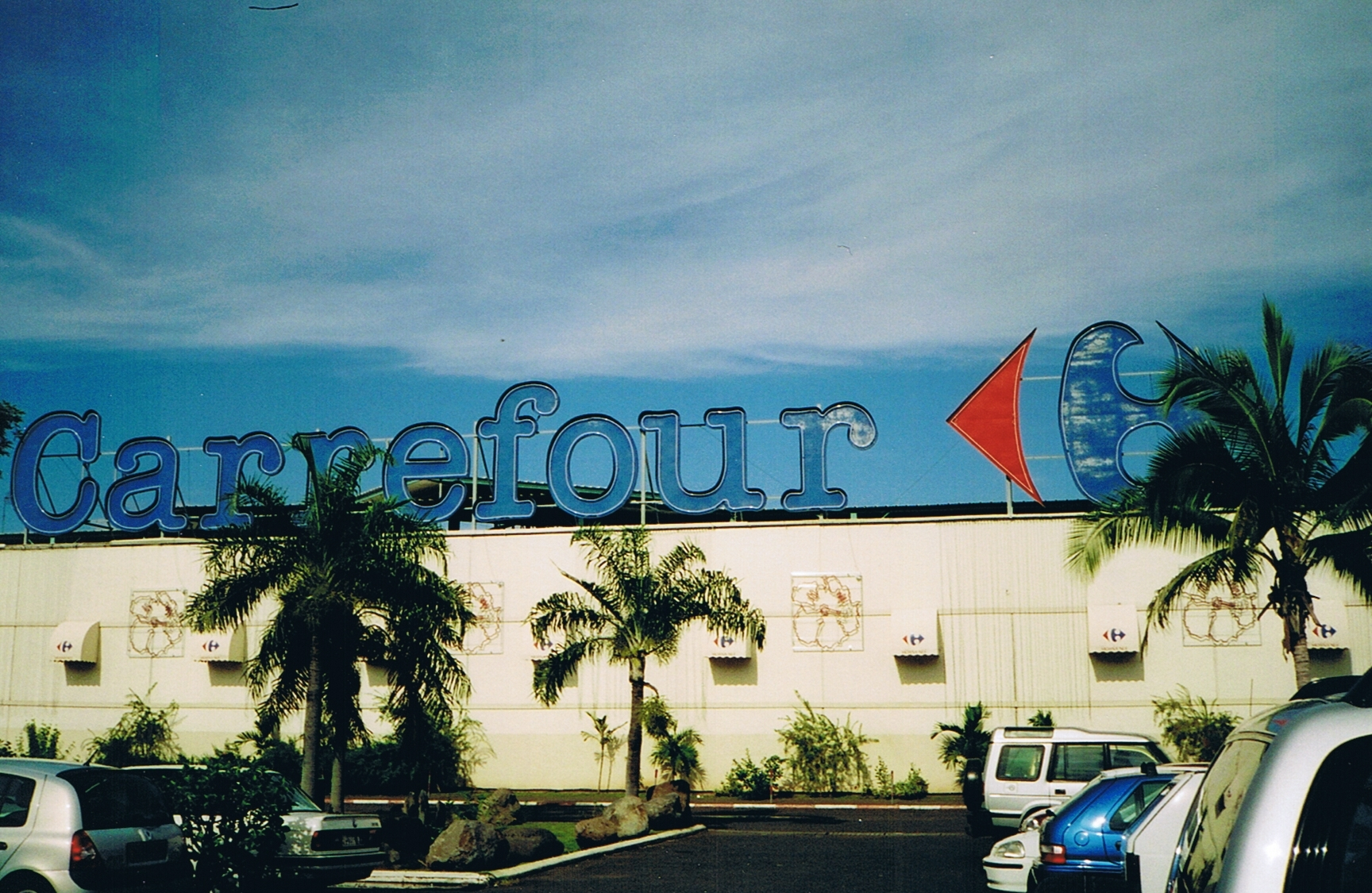
The Carrefour market, located in the commune

Air Tahiti has its head office on the airport property in Faʼaʼā. There are many supermarkets in Faʼaʼā. The supermarkets mainly sell bread, milk, fruits, and ice cream. There is also one of the largest malls in French Polynesia in downtown Faʼaʼā. It has a clothing store a market, and a souvenir shop. The now defunct Air Moʼorea had its head office in Faʼaʼā. Many people that work in other communes such as Papeʼete or Teahupoʼo live in Faʼaʼā. There are businesses like McDonald's that are close to the public beach. The port of Papeʼete has many workers that live in Faʼaʼā. Many other people that work in Papeʼete or Teahupoʼo live in Faʼaʼā. The port of Papeʼete has many workers who live in Faʼaʼā. There is a Carrefour market in the commune.

=== Agriculture ===
Farms in Faʼaʼā are usually found in the mountains to the east. The farms are all more than 300 m (1,000 ft) above mean sea level far from the coastline. The farms in the mountains have Tahitian flowers growing in the fields. The flowers get picked and are usually sent to Faʼaʼā International Airport to greet the passengers that have just arrived. There are many tractors on the fields that plow the dirt. Banana trees are plentiful throughout Faʼaʼā and also a major export to other islands. The main islands that get imported from Faʼaʼā are Moʼorea, Huahine, and Raiatea. Many strawberries are also found in the farms. Potatoes, apples, and raspberries are all other major fruits grown at the farms of Faʼaʼā. School lunches usually contain fruits from these farms. The Moʼorea juice factory is a major juice factory on Moʼorea that exports its juice to Faʼaʼā.

== Sports ==
=== World Championship Tour ===
The surfing world champions of Teahupoʼo have been to Faʼaʼā. Teahupoʼo is a reef break, making big waves. The swells usually break to the left but sometimes break to the right. The big swells cause Teahupoʼo to become a major place for the World Championship Tour (WCT). People such as Mike Stewart and Ben Severson are the boogieboarding champions of Teahupoʼo. The first surfing champion of Teahupoʼo to win an award was in 1999.

=== Other sports ===
Soccer games (in Faʼaʼā, it's called football) is a major sport played at the school parks. The parks have chairs set in a field and people can easily see the game. The soccer fields are relatively small.

Other major sports played in Faʼaʼā are tennis and basketball.

== Name ==
The official spelling of the French Commune is Faaa. However, it is more frequently spelled as Faa'a or Fa'a'a, using the apostrophe to represent the glottal stop, as promoted by the Académie Tahitienne and accepted by the territorial government.

== Music of Faʼaʼā ==
The nose flute (vivo) is a popular instrument throughout French Polynesia. Tahitian drums (toere) are also popular and are made from hollow trunks of trees and animal skins. The residents of Faʼaʼā can take lessons at the University of French Polynesia.

== Art ==
There are art museums in the mountains of Faʼaʼā. The mountains of Tahiti and other islands have inspired Paul Gauguin. Some paintings can be found in the museums which are a very popular tourist attraction. The Musée de la Perle is a major art museum in nearby Papeʼete. The house of James Norman Hall used to be a mansion in Arue. It is now a renowned museum that is a major tourist attraction. Art galleries are found throughout the island of Tahiti and there are 10 in Papeʼete.

== See also ==
- Demographics of France
- Demographics of French Polynesia
- Mahina, French Polynesia
