= 2012–13 New Zealand Football Championship =

ASB Premiership
- Season: 2012–13
- Champions: Waitakere United
- Premiers: Waitakere United
- OFC Champions League: Waitakere United; Auckland City
- Matches: 44
- Goals: 174 (3.95 per match)
- Top goalscorer: Roy Krishna (12)
- Biggest home win: 5x 4–0
- Biggest away win: Waikato 1–9 Waitakere United (Round 9)
- Highest scoring: Waikato 1–9 Waitakere United (Round 9)

The New Zealand Football Championship's 2012–13 season (known as the ASB Premiership for sponsorship reasons) will be the ninth season of the NZFC since its establishment in 2004. The home and away season will begin on 3 November 2012 with the final scheduled to be on 17 March 2013. As a new feature, three games will be played as curtain-raisers to Wellington Phoenix home matches in Westpac Stadium. Auckland City and Waitakere United will represent the ASB Premiership in the 2012–13 OFC Champions League after finishing Minor Premiers and Champions respectively in the 2011–12 competition.

== Clubs ==
Team	Location	Stadium	Capacity	Manager	Captain	Kit manufacturer	Shirt sponsor
Auckland City FC	Auckland	Kiwitea Street	3,500	(Spain) Ramon Tribulietx	(New Zealand) Ivan Vicelich	Nike	Trillian Trust Inc.
Canterbury United	Christchurch	ASB Football Park	9,000	(New Zealand) Keith Braithwaite	(England) Dan Terris	Samurai	Robbie's Bar and Bistro
Hawke's Bay United	Napier	Bluewater Stadium	5,000	(New Zealand) Chris Greatholder	(England) Bill Robertson	Samurai	Kinetic Electrical
Otago United	Dunedin	Forsyth Barr Stadium	30,500	(New Zealand) Richard Murray	(New Zealand) Tristan Prattley	Canterbury	Gran's Remedy
Team Wellington	Wellington	David Farrington Park	3,000	(New Zealand) Matt Calcott	(New Zealand) Karl Whalen	adidas	Exodus Health & Fitness Club
Waikato FC	Hamilton	Porritt Stadium	2,700	(New Zealand) Mark Cossey	(New Zealand) Adam Thomas	Nike	The Soccer Shop
Waitakere United	West Auckland	Fred Taylor Park	2,500	(New Zealand) Paul Marshall	(New Zealand) Jake Butler	Lotto Sport Italia	Cuesports Foundation
YoungHeart Manawatu	Palmerston North	Memorial Park	8,000	(New Zealand) Stu Jacobs	(New Zealand) Nathan Cooksley	Nike	New Zealand Pharmaceuticals

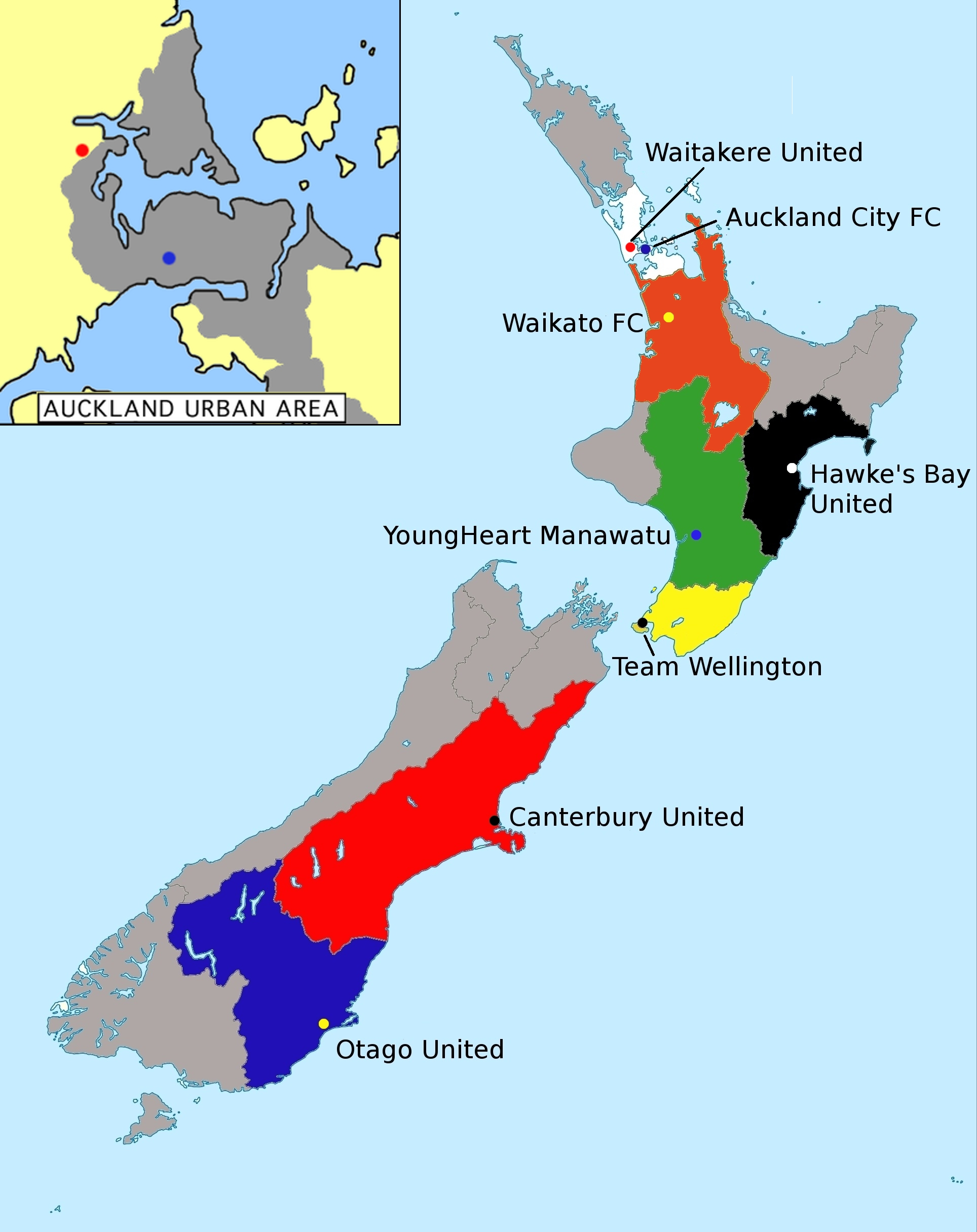
Location of clubs and the region they represent

== League table ==
Pos	Team	Pld	W	D	L	GF	GA	GD	Pts	Qualification
1	Waitakere United (C)	14	12	1	1	48	12	+36	37	Qualified for the Finals and Champions League
2	Auckland City	14	10	3	1	44	18	+26	33	Qualified for the Finals and Champions League
3	Canterbury United	14	9	1	4	34	19	+15	28	Qualified for the Finals
4	Hawke's Bay United	14	7	3	4	29	21	+8	24	Qualified for the Finals
5	Team Wellington	14	7	0	7	27	21	+6	21	
6	Waikato FC	14	3	0	11	18	48	−30	9	
7	Otago United	14	2	0	12	14	40	−26	6	
8	YoungHeart Manawatu	14	2	0	12	15	50	−35	6	Disbanded at end of season

(C) Champions

== Regular season ==
=== Round 1 ===
Saturday, 3 November 2012

2:00pm Saturday	Auckland City FC	5–2	Canterbury United	Kiwitea Street, Auckland
	Adam Dickinson 20', 29'; Chris Bale 39'; Albert Riera 77'; Emiliano Tade 81'	Preview; Report	Julyan Collett 40'; Aaron Clapham 69' (pen.)	Attendance: 635; Referee: Peter O'Leary

Sunday, 4 November 2012

12:00pm Sunday	Otago United	0–3	YoungHeart Manawatu	Forsyth Barr Stadium, Dunedin
		Preview; Report	Tomas Mosquera 8', 28', 55'	Attendance: 250; Referee: Issac Trevis

12:00pm Sunday	Waikato FC	0–2	Hawke's Bay United	Porritt Stadium, Hamilton
		Preview; Report	Sean Lovemore 71', 80'	Attendance: 300; Referee: John Rowberry

2:00pm Sunday	Waitakere United	3–0	Team Wellington	Fred Taylor Park, West Auckland
	Roy Krishna (28s); David Mulligan 65' (pen.); Allan Pearce 78'	Preview; Report		Attendance: 347; Referee: Matt Conger

=== Round 2 ===
Sunday, 11 November 2012

1:45pm Sunday	Team Wellington	0–1	Canterbury United	Westpac Stadium, Wellington
		Preview; Report	Julyan Collett 13'	Attendance: 402; Referee: Mark Hester

2:00pm Sunday	Waitakere United	1–0	Waikato FC	Fred Taylor Park, West Auckland
	David Mulligan 66' (pen.)	Preview; Report		Attendance: 328; Referee: Isaac Trevis

2:00pm Sunday	Hawke's Bay United	4–2	YoungHeart Manawatu	Bluewater Stadium, Napier
	Stephen Hoyle 6'; Cole Peverley 31'; Sean Lovemore 45+2', 46'	Preview; Report	Tom Mosquera 75'; Lewis Cumber 76'	Attendance: 413; Referee: Nick Waldron

2:00pm Sunday	Otago United	1–3	Auckland City FC	Forsyth Barr Stadium, Dunedin
	Regan Coldicott 62'	Preview; Report	Luis Corrales 85', 90+2'; Alex Feneridis 89'	Attendance: 200; Referee: Campbell-Kirk Waugh

=== Round 3 ===
Sunday, 18 November 2012

1:00pm Sunday	Waikato FC	1–4	Team Wellington	Porritt Stadium, Hamilton
	Eder Franchini 33'	Preview; Report	Hamish Watson (2) 38' (pen.), 64'; Cory Chettleburgh 61'; Karsten Viborg 81'	Attendance: 450; Referee: Matt Conger

2:00pm Sunday	YoungHeart Manawatu	0–5	Waitakere United	Memorial Park, Palmerston North
		Preview; Report	Ryan de Vries 13'; David Mulligan 30'; Roy Krishna 40'; Allan Pearce 46'; George Slefendorfas 89'	Attendance: 400

2:00pm Sunday	Canterbury United	2–1	Otago United	ASB Football Park, Christchurch
	Darren White 24'; Dimitar Bayrev 26'	Preview; Report	Joel Stevens 45'	Referee: Mirko Benischke

2:30pm Sunday	Auckland City FC	1–1	Hawke's Bay United	Kiwitea Street, Auckland
	Alex Feneridis 53'	Preview; Report	Sean Lovemore 32'

=== Round 4 ===
Sunday, 25 November 2012

12:00pm Sunday	Waikato FC	0–5	Canterbury United	Centennial Park, Ngāruawāhia
		Preview; Report	Russell Kamo 18'; Aaron Clapham 55'; Darren White 74'; Ashley Welborn 77', 81'	Attendance: 250; Referee: Nick Waldron

2:00pm Sunday	Waitakere United	1–1	Auckland City FC	Fred Taylor Park, West Auckland
	Jake Butler 22'	Preview; Report	Luis Corrales 41'	Attendance: 650; Referee: Mirko Benischke

2:00pm Sunday	Team Wellington	3–1	YoungHeart Manawatu	David Farrington Park, Wellington
	Tobias Bertsch 39'; Henry Fa'arodo 56'; Justin Gulley 65'	Preview; Report	Tom Mosquera 34'	Attendance: 412; Referee: Peter O'Leary

2:00pm Sunday	Hawke's Bay United	2–0	Otago United	Bluewater Stadium, Napier
	Rudi Bauerfiend 47'; Sean Lovemore 77'	Preview; Report		Attendance: 412; Referee: Matt Conger

=== Round 5 ===
Sunday, 2 December 2012

1:45pm Sunday	YoungHeart Manawatu	2–3	Waikato FC	Westpac Stadium, Wellington
	Tom Mosquera 68', 90+2'	Preview; Rrport	Rory Turner 18'; Sam Margetts 69'; Ryan Thomas 81'	Attendance: 150; Referee: Campbell Kirk Waugh

2:00pm Sunday	Waitakere United	4–1	Otago United	Fred Taylor Park, West Auckland
	David Mulligan 13'; Jake Butler 55'; Roy Krishna 86'; Ryan De Vries 88'	Preview; Report	Joel Stevens 7'	Attendance: 212; Referee: Nick Waldron

2:30pm Sunday	Canterbury United	4–0	Hawke's Bay United	English Park, Christchurch
	Aaron Clapham 33', 62' (pen.); Russell Kamo 38'; Dan Terris 73'	Preview; Report		Attendance: 400; Referee: John Rowbury

=== Round 6 ===
Sunday, 9 December 2012

1:45pm Sunday	Team Wellington	0–1	Otago United	Westpac Stadium, Wellington
		Report	Joel Stevens 84'	Attendance: 412; Referee: Mirko Benischke

2:00pm Sunday	YoungHeart Manawatu	0–2	Canterbury United	Memorial Park, Palmerston North
		Report	Darren White 74'; Russell Kamo 85'	Attendance: 150; Referee: Mark Hester

2:30pm Sunday	Waitakere United	3–1	Hawke's Bay United	Fred Taylor Park, West Auckland
	Brian Shelley 11'; David Mulligan 14'; Milos Nikolic 90+2'	Report	Stephen Hoyle 22'	Attendance: 273; Referee: Matt Conger

=== Round 7 ===
Sunday, 16 December 2012

1:00pm Sunday	Otago United	1–6	Waikato FC	Forsyth Barr Stadium, Dunedin
	Tristan Prattley 60'	Preview; Report	Jack Hobson-McVeigh 20'; Eder Franchini 24'; Rory Turner 48', 72', 90+2'; Hone Fowler 79'	Attendance: 200; Referee: Matt Conger

2:00pm Sunday	Auckland City FC	4–0	YoungHeart Manawatu	Kiwitea Street, Auckland
	Chris Bale 16'; Emiliano Tade 19'; Manel Exposito 41' (pen.); David Browne 70'	Preview; Report		Attendance: 1027; Referee: Isaac Trevis

2:00pm Sunday	Hawke's Bay United	3–0	Team Wellington	Bluewater Stadium, Napier
	Dakota Lucas 13'; Cole Peverley 14' (pen.); Connor Tinnion 66'	Preview; Report		Attendance: 426; Referee: Nick Waldron

2:00pm Sunday	Canterbury United	1–3	Waitakere United	ASB Football Park, Christchurch
	Dan Terris 8'	Preview; Report	Jake Butler 15'; Roy Krishna 53'; Ryan de Vries 88'	Attendance: 400; Referee: Mirko Benischke

=== Round 6 Catch Up ===
Sunday, 6 January 2013

5:30pm Wednesday	Waikato FC	1–4	Auckland City FC	Centennial Park, Ngāruawāhia
	Sam Margetts 31'	Preview; Report	Daniel Koprivcic 3', 61'; Manel Exposito 49', 59'	Attendance: 513; Referee: Mirko Benischke

=== Round 8 ===
Sunday, 12 January 2013

4:00pm Saturday	Team Wellington	1–3	Waitakere United	David Farrington Park, Wellington
	Darren Cheriton 5'	Preview; Report	Brian Shelley 16'; Roy Krishna 57', 74'	Attendance: 212; Referee: Campbell-Kirk Waugh

Sunday, 13 January 2013

2:00pm Sunday	Canterbury United	1–3	Auckland City FC	ASB Football Park, Christchurch
	Andrew Barton 14'	Preview; Report	Alex Feneridis 26'; Daniel Koprivcic 52'; Emiliano Tade 79'	Attendance: 600; Referee: Issac Trevis

2:00pm Sunday	Hawke's Bay United	4–0	Waikato FC	Bluewater Stadium, Napier
	Jarrod Smith 45', 48'; Conor Tinnion 77'; Sean Lovemore 80'	Preview; Report		Attendance: 413; Referee: R Scholes

2:00pm Sunday	YoungHeart Manawatu	1–4	Otago United	Memorial Park, Palmerston North
	Suele Soromon 87' (pen.)	Preview; Report	Aaron Burgess 11' (pen.), 74'; Regan Coldicott 62', 67'	Attendance: 150; Referee: N Waldron

=== Round 9 ===
Sunday, 20 January 2013

2:00pm Sunday	Auckland City FC	3–1	Otago United	Kiwitea Street, Auckland
	Andrew Milne 17'; Manel Exposito 24'; Adam Dickinson 66'	Preview; Report	Regan Coldicott 37'	Attendance: 934; Referee: Jon Rowberry

2:00pm Sunday	YoungHeart Manawatu	1–5	Hawke's Bay United	Memorial Park, Palmerston North
	Seule Soromon 74'	Preview; Report	Dakota Lucas 3'; Cole Peverley 15'; Sean Lovemore 19', 45'; Jarrod Smith 21'	Referee: Mirko Benischke

2:00pm Sunday	Waikato FC	1–9	Waitakere United	Porritt Stadium, Hamilton
	Sunny Singh 60'	Preview; Report	Allan Pearce 10', 27', 83'; Brian Shelley 17'; Chad Coombes 18'; Roy Krishna 21', 85', 90'; Ryan De Vries 23'	Attendance: 439; Referee: Peter O'Leary

2:00pm Sunday	Canterbury United	0–2	Team Wellington	ASB Football Park, Christchurch
		Preview; Report	Wiremu Patrick 45' (pen.); Luis Corrales 68'	Attendance: 400; Referee: Mark Hester

=== Round 10 ===
Saturday, 26 January 2013

2:00pm Saturday	Waitakere United	4–0	YoungHeart Manawatu	Fred Taylor Park, West Auckland
	Tim Myers 27', 31'; Roy Krishna 74', 90+4'	Preview; Report		Attendance: 342; Referee: Mark Hester

2:00pm Saturday	Team Wellington	1–0	Waikato FC	David Farrington Park, Wellington
	Luke Rowe 89'	Preview; Report		Attendance: 251; Referee: Issac Trevis

Sunday, 27 January 2013

Hawke's Bay United	1–1	Auckland City FC	Bluewater Stadium, Napier
Jarrod Smith 70'	Report	Pedro Garcia 57'	Attendance: 516; Referee: J Rowbury

3:00pm Sunday	Otago United	1–4	Canterbury United	Forsyth Barr Stadium, Dunedin
	Regan Coldicott 85'	Report	Ken Yamamoto 28', 75'; Ashley Wellbourn 33'; Andy Barton 68'	Attendance: 300; Referee: Campbell-Kirk Waugh

=== Round 11 ===
Saturday, 2 February 2013

1:00pm Saturday	Auckland City FC	2–3	Waitakere United	Kiwitea Street, Auckland
	Alex Feneridis 11'; Manel Exposito 48'	Report	Luiz Del Monte 43'; Roy Krishna 59'; Tim Myers 74'	Attendance: 1876; Referee: Matt Conger

Sunday, 3 February 2013

12:00pm Sunday	Otago United	1–3	Hawke's Bay United	Forsyth Barr Stadium, Dunedin
	Victor da Costa 57'	Report	Jarrod Smith 2' (pen.); Stephen Hindmarch 8'; Sean Lovemore 63' (pen.)	Attendance: 200; Referee: Mirko Benischke

2:00pm Sunday	Canterbury United	4–0	Waikato FC	ASB Football Park, Christchurch
	Aaron Clapham 41', 49' (pen.); Russell Kamo 63'; Ken Yamamoto 83'	Report		Attendance: 275; Referee: Peter O'Leary

2:00pm Sunday	YoungHeart Manawatu	0–6	Team Wellington	Memorial Park, Palmerston North
		Report	Wiremu Patrick 2', 7'; Rowe Dominic 39'; Luke Rowe 41'; Hamish Watson 80', 83'	Attendance: 200; Referee: J Rowbury

=== Round 5 Catch Up ===
Wednesday, 6 February 2013

2:00pm Wednesday	Auckland City FC	3–2	Team Wellington	Kiwitea Street, Auckland
	Chris Bale 39'; Manel Exposito 73'; Ivan Vicelich 90+4'	Preview; Report	Henry Fa'arodo 9'; Cory Chettleburgh 57'	Attendance: 716; Referee: Campbell-Kirk Waugh

=== Round 12 ===
Sunday, 10 February 2013

1:00pm Sunday	Otago United	1–4	Waitakere United	Forsyth Barr Stadium, Dunedin
	Regan Coldicott 49'	Preview; Report	Ryan De Vries 31', 37', 90+3' (pen.); Milos Nikolic 89'	Attendance: 220; Referee: I. Trevis

2:00pm Sunday	Hawke's Bay United	1–1	Canterbury United	Bluewater Stadium, Napier
	Connor Tinnion 43'	Preview; Report	Aaron Clapham 45+2'	Attendance: 464; Referee: Nick Waldron

2:30pm Sunday	Waikato FC	2–3	YoungHeart Manawatu	Porritt Stadium, Hamilton
	Rory Turner 8'; Gurjeep Singh 54'	Preview; Report	Seule Soromon 4', 18'; Sam Redwood 84'	Attendance: 304; Referee: Mirko Benischke

4:00pm Sunday	Team Wellington	2–3	Auckland City FC	David Farrington Park, Wellington
	Darren Cheriton 32'; Hamish Watson 81'	Preview; Report	Adam Dickinson 52'; Simon Arms 66'; Daniel Koprivcic 90+1'	Attendance: 305; Referee: Peter O'Leary

=== Round 13 ===
Sunday, 17 February 2013

2:00pm Sunday	Auckland City FC	7–1	Waikato FC	Kiwitea Street, Auckland
	Gustavo Souto 11', 24'; Alex Feneridis 29'; Adam Dickinson 43' (pen.); Manel Exposito 45+1'; Emiliano Tade 59'; Chris Bale 89'	Report	Sunny Singh 55'	Attendance: 874; Referee: Nick Waldron

2:00pm Sunday	Otago United	0–2	Team Wellington	Rugby Park, Invercargill
		Report	Henry Fa'arodo 16'; Hamish Watson 24'	Attendance: 350; Referee: Mark Hester

2:10pm Sunday	Canterbury United	4–1	YoungHeart Manawatu	ASB Football Park, Christchurch
	Aaron Clapham 11' (pen.), 70', 82' (pen.); Russell Kamo 59'	Report	Seule Soroman 33' (pen.)	Attendance: 375; Referee: Matt Conger

2:15pm Sunday	Hawke's Bay United	0–3	Waitakere United	Bluewater Stadium, Napier
		Report	Jake Butler 31'; Matt Cunneen 51'; Ryan De Vries 56'	Attendance: 415; Referee: Peter O'Leary

=== Round 14 ===
Saturday, 23 February 2013

1:30pm Saturday	Team Wellington	4–2	Hawke's Bay United	David Farrington Park, Wellington
	Luis Corrales 16'; Hamish Watson 29', 47'; Adam McGeorge 35'	Report	Stephen Hoyle 38'; Dakota Lucas 45+1'	Attendance: 222; Referee: Mirko Benischke

Sunday, 24 February 2013

1:00pm Sunday	Waikato FC	3–1	Otago United	Centennial Park, Ngāruawāhia
	Gurjeep Singh 9', 23'; Alexis Cárcamo 70'	Report	Aajay Cunningham 54'	Referee: Peter O'Leary

1:00pm Sunday	Waitakere United	2–3	Canterbury United	Fred Taylor Park, West Auckland
	Milos Nikolic 42'; Louie Bush 90+3' (o.g.)	Report	Aaron Clapham 8' (pen.); Russell Kamo 59', 90+1'	Attendance: 609; Referee: Nick Waldron

2:00pm Sunday	YoungHeart Manawatu	1–4	Auckland City FC	Memorial Park, Palmerston North
	Dale Higham 4'	Report	Emiliano Tade 23', 50'; Manuel Exposito 64'; Daniel Saric 83'	Attendance: 150; Referee: Campbel-Kirk Waugh

== Finals ==
=== Semi-finals – first leg ===
Sunday, 3 March 2013

2:00 pm Sunday	Hawke's Bay United	1–4	Waitakere United	Bluewater Stadium, Napier

2:00 pm Sunday	Canterbury United	1–2	Auckland City FC	ASB Football Park, Christchurch

=== Semi-finals – second leg ===
Saturday, 9 March 2013

2:00 pm Saturday	Waitakere United	6–4	Hawke's Bay United	Fred Taylor Park, West Auckland

Sunday, 10 March 2013

2:00 pm Sunday	Auckland City FC	3–1	Canterbury United	Kiwitea Street, Auckland

=== Final ===
Sunday, 17 March 2013

2:00 pm Sunday	Waitakere United	4–3 (a.e.t.)	Auckland City FC	Fred Taylor Park, West Auckland
	Roy Krishna 30', 90'; Allan Pearce 32', 100'	Report	Manel Exposito 15', 74'; Chris Bale 89'	Attendance: 1600; Referee: Peter O'Leary

== Positions by round ==
Team ╲ Round	1	2	3	4	5	6	7	6*	8	9	10	11	5*	12	13	14
Auckland City	1	1	2	4	4	4	4	3	2	2	2	3	2	2	2	2
Canterbury United	6	5	4	3	2	2	2	2	4	4	4	4	4	4	3	3
Hawke's Bay United	4	2	3	2	3	3	3	4	3	3	3	2	3	3	4	4
Otago United	7	8	7	7	8	8	8	8	7	6	6	6	6	6	6	7
Team Wellington	7	7	5	5	5	5	5	5	5	5	5	5	5	5	5	5
Waikato FC	5	6	8	8	7	7	6	6	6	7	7	7	7	7	7	6
Waitakere United	2	3	1	1	1	1	1	1	1	1	1	1	1	1	1	1
YoungHeart Manawatu	2	4	6	6	6	6	7	7	8	8	8	8	8	8	8	8

^{*} Signals catch-up rounds

== Season statistics ==
=== Leading goalscorers ===
Updated to end of regular season

Total	Player		Team	Goals per Round (Note: Goals scored within Round 5 Catch-up were included within Round 5, and goals scored within Round 6 Catch-up were included within Round 6)													
Total	Player		Team	1	2	3	4	5	6	7	8	9	10	11	12	13	14
12	(Fiji)	Roy Krishna	Waitakere United	1		1		1		1	2	3	2	1			
11	(New Zealand)	Aaron Clapham	Canterbury United	1			1	2						2	1	3	1
10	(New Zealand)	Sean Lovemore	Hawke's Bay United	2	2	1	1				1	2		1			
8	(South Africa)	Ryan De Vries	Waitakere United			1		1		1		1			3	1	
8	(New Zealand)	Hamish Watson	Team Wellington			2								2	1	1	2
8	(Spain)	Manel Exposito	Auckland City FC					1	2	1		1		1		1	1
7	(New Zealand)	Tomas Mosquera	YoungHeart Manawatu	3	1		1	2									
7	(New Zealand)	Russell Kamo	Canterbury United				1	1	1					1		1	2
6	(New Zealand)	Regan Coldicott	Otago United		1						2	1	1		1		
6	(Argentina)	Emiliano Tade	Auckland City FC	1						1	1					1	2

A goal was scored from a penalty kick Two goals were scored from penalty kicks

=== Own goals ===
Updated to end of regular season

Total	Player		Team	Week(s)
1	(New Zealand)	Louie Bush	Canterbury United (v Waitakere United)	14

== ASB Premiership Monthly Awards ==
Month	Most Outstanding Player		Coach of the Month	
Month	Player	Club	Player	Club
November 2012	(New Zealand) Russell Kamo	Canterbury United	(New Zealand) Chris Greatholder	Hawke's Bay United
December 2012	(New Zealand) Jake Butler	Waitakere United	(New Zealand) Paul Marshall	Waitakere United
January 2013	(Fiji) Roy Krishna	Waitakere United	(Spain) Ramon Tribulietx	Auckland City FC
February 2013	(New Zealand) Aaron Clapham	Canterbury United	(New Zealand) Keith Braithwaite	Canterbury United

== Attendances ==
Team	Home average
Auckland City	1,010
Hawke's Bay United	437
Canterbury United	408
Waitakere United	394
Waikato FC	376
Team Wellington	317
Otago United	246
YoungHeart Manawatu	200
