= Elliot Collier =

New Zealand footballer

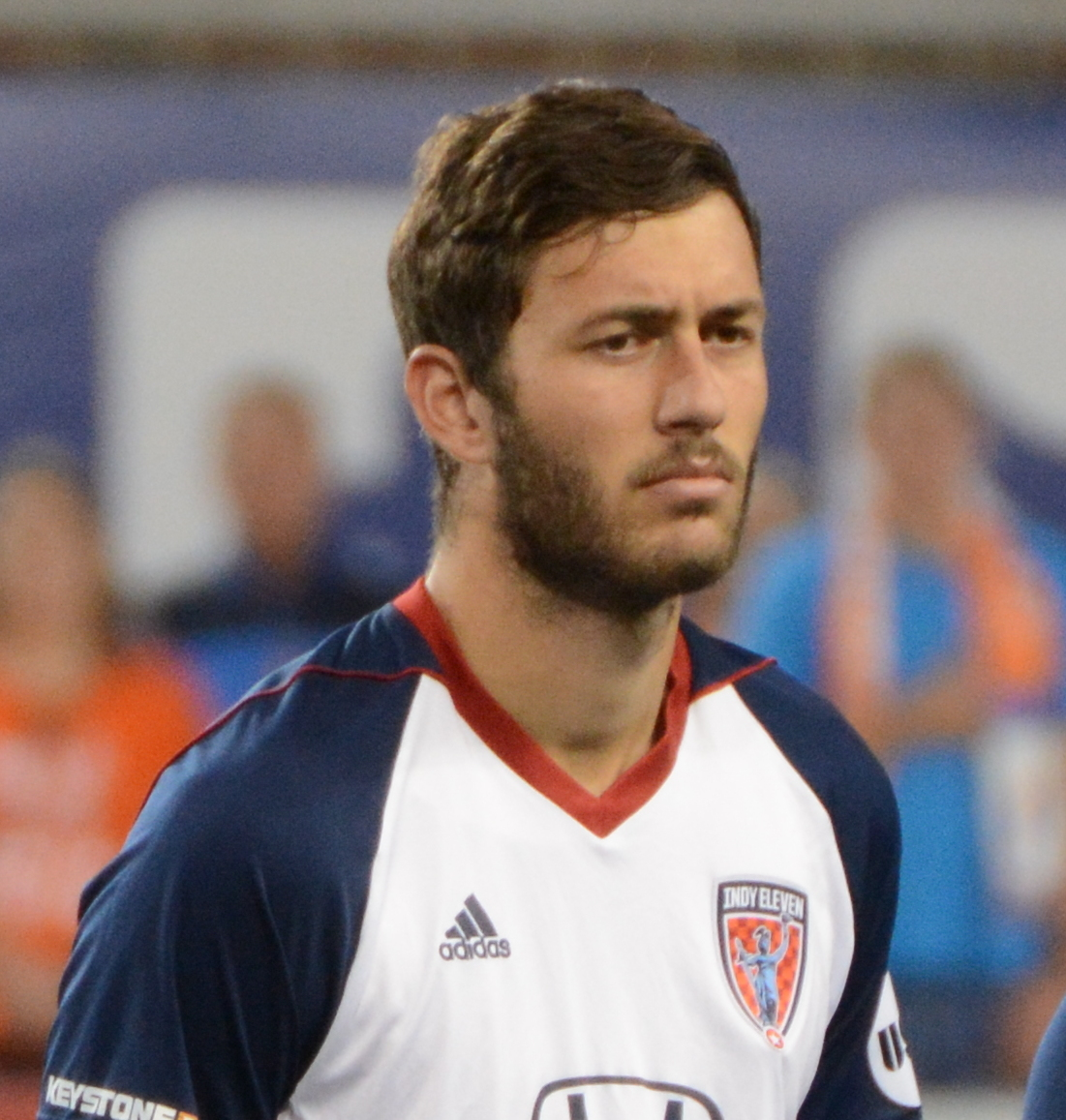
- Collier with Indy Eleven in 2018

Personal information
- Full name: Elliot Collier
- Date of birth: 22 February 1995 (age 31)
- Place of birth: Hamilton, New Zealand
- Height: 1.93 m (6 ft 4 in)
- Position: Forward

Youth career
- Olé Football Academy

College career
Years	Team	Apps	(Gls)
2014–2017	Loyola Ramblers	69	(15)

Senior career*
Years	Team	Apps	(Gls)
2012	Hamilton Wanderers	?	(8)
2012–2013	Waikato United	2	(0)
2013	Island Bay United	19	(16)
2016	Chicago FC United	8	(2)
2017	Michigan Bucks	0	(0)
2018–2021	Chicago Fire	54	(1)
2018	→ Indy Eleven (loan)	11	(1)
2019	→ Memphis 901 (loan)	26	(6)
2022	San Antonio FC	23	(4)
2023	San Diego Loyal	23	(2)
2024–2025	Indy Eleven	49	(5)

International career^{‡}
2019–	New Zealand	2	(0)
- * Club domestic league appearances and goals as of 15:09, 23 December 2025 (UTC) ‡ National team caps and goals as of 21 November 2024

Elliot Collier (born 22 February 1995) is a New Zealand professional soccer player who most recently played as a forward for USL Championship club Indy Eleven and the New Zealand national team.

== Club career ==
=== Semi-professional & college (2012–2017) ===
After spending time in his native New Zealand playing semi-professionally with Hamilton Wanderers, Waikato United and Island Bay United, Collier moved to the United States to play college soccer at Loyola University Chicago. Collier played four years with the Ramblers, scoring 15 goals and tallying 11 assists in 69 appearances.

Collier also appeared for USL PDL sides Chicago FC United and Michigan Bucks.

=== Chicago Fire (2018–2021) ===
On 21 January 2018, Collier was selected with the 49th overall pick of the 2018 MLS SuperDraft by the Chicago Fire. Collier signed with the club on 28 February 2018.

Collier made his professional debut on 10 March 2018 as an 88th-minute substitute during a 3–4 loss to Sporting Kansas City.

Collier made 16 appearances for the Fire in his debut season, scoring one goal and making one assist.

==== Loan to Indy Eleven (2018) ====
On 10 August 2018, Collier joined USL Championship club Indy Eleven on loan for the remainder of the 2018 season. Collier made 11 appearances for the Eleven, including five starts, and scored one goal.

==== Loan to Memphis 901 FC (2019) ====
Collier was loaned to USL Championship club Memphis 901 FC in his second full year with the Fire. Collier made 26 total appearances for Memphis, scoring six goals including the club's first ever competitive goal in a 1–1 draw at Loudoun United on 16 March and the club's first hat-trick in a 4–1 victory over Hartford Athletic on 6 July.

==== Return to Chicago (2020–2021) ====
Collier returned to his parent club at the conclusion of the 2019 season, signing a new contract under new head coach Raphaël Wicky. Collier would make 21 appearances, including two starts, for the MLS club in the 2020 season.

Collier returned with the Fire for the 2021 MLS season, making 17 appearances, including three starts. Collier's contract option was declined by Chicago and he was released by the club at the conclusion of the 2021 season.

=== San Antonio FC (2022) ===
Collier signed with San Antonio FC in the USL Championship on 7 January 2022. Collier made 25 total appearances for San Antonio, scoring four league goals and one in the U.S. Open Cup. Collier made one substitute playoffs appearance for San Antonio, coming on in the 97th minute of the team's 3–1 victory over Louisville City in the final. Collier was released by San Antonio at the end of the 2022 season.

=== San Diego Loyal (2023) ===
On 27 December 2022, it was announced that Collier would play the 2023 season with San Diego Loyal in the USL Championship. Collier ended the season with two goals and three assists, with San Diego in third in the Western Conference, qualifying for the playoffs.

=== Return to Indy Eleven (2024–2025) ===
Collier returned to Indy Eleven on 17 January 2024 ahead of the 2024 USL Championship season. He made his second debut for the club on 9 March in the club's season opening 2–1 defeat at Oakland Roots, replacing fellow debutant Karsen Henderlong in the 66th minute. Collier scored his first goal of the 2024 season on 4 May in a 1–0 victory over Monterey Bay FC. Collier scored his second goal of the season on 5 July in a 3–3 away draw against Rhode Island FC. He ended the season with 37 total appearances, including in Indy Eleven's playoff defeat to Rhode Island FC and their historic semifinal appearance in the U.S. Open Cup. On 20 November 2024, Indy Eleven announced that Collier would remain with the team for a second season. Collier spent the 2025 season with Indy Eleven, making 24 appearances in all competitions. His contract ended with the club upon the conclusion of the 2025 season.

== International career ==
Collier was born in New Zealand to an English mother and Kiwi father, and was eligible to represent both national teams. Collier received his first call-up to the New Zealand men's national team in November 2019 and made his international debut in a 3–1 friendly defeat to the Republic of Ireland on 14 November 2019, replacing winger Callum McCowatt in the 85th minute.

Collier made his first start for New Zealand in a 1–0 friendly defeat to Lithuania on 17 November 2019.

== Personal life ==
Collier was a close friend and teammate of New Zealand futsal player Atta Elayyan, who was murdered in the Christchurch mosque shootings on 15 March 2019. Collier wore a black armband in remembrance of Elayyan in a 1–1 draw with Loudoun United the next day while on loan at Memphis 901 FC. Collier scored for Memphis, the first goal in the club's history, and later dedicated the goal to Elayyan.

== Career statistics ==
=== Club ===
As of match played 25 October 2025.

Appearances and goals by club, season and competition
Club	Season	League			National Cup		Playoffs		League Cup		Total	
Club	Season	Division	Apps	Goals	Apps	Goals	Apps	Goals	Apps	Goals	Apps	Goals
WaiBOP United	2012–13	NZ Premiership	2	0	—		—		—		2	0
Island Bay United	2013	Central League	19	16	—		—		—		19	16
Chicago FC United	2016	USL League 2	8	2	—		—		—		8	2
Michigan Bucks	2017	USL PDL	0	0	1	0	—		—		1	0
Chicago Fire	2018	Major League Soccer	16	1	1	1	—		—		17	2
Chicago Fire	2019	Major League Soccer	0	0	—		—		—		0	0
Chicago Fire	2020	Major League Soccer	21	0	—		—		—		21	0
Chicago Fire	2021	Major League Soccer	17	0	—		—		—		17	0
Chicago Fire	Total		54	1	1	1	0	0	0	0	55	2
Indy Eleven (loan)	2018	USL Championship	11	1	—		1	0	—		12	1
Memphis 901 (loan)	2019	USL Championship	26	6	3	1	—		—		29	7
San Antonio FC	2022	USL Championship	22	4	2	1	1	0	—		25	5
San Diego Loyal	2023	USL Championship	23	2	2	0	0	0	—		25	2
Indy Eleven	2024	USL Championship	31	5	5	0	1	0	—		37	5
Indy Eleven	2025	USL Championship	18	0	2	0	0	0	4	0	24	0
Indy Eleven	Total		49	5	7	0	1	0	4	0	61	5
Career total			214	37	16	3	3	0	4	0	237	40
