= 2022 San Antonio FC season =

San Antonio FC
2022 season
- Owner: Spurs Sports & Entertainment
- Head coach: Alen Marcina
- Stadium: Toyota Field
- USLC: Western Conference: 1st Overall: 1st
- USLC Playoffs: Winners
- U.S. Open Cup: Round of 32
- Copa Tejas: Winners
- Copa Tejas Shield: Winners
- Top goalscorer: League: Samuel Adeniran (10 goals); All: Samuel Adeniran (12 goals)
- Highest home attendance: 8,534 vs Louisville City FC (November 13, 2022)
- Lowest home attendance: 2,145 vs D'Feeters Kicks SC (April 5, 2022)
- Average home league attendance: League: 5,980; Playoffs: 8,329
- Biggest win: 6–0 (April 30 vs. Monterey Bay FC)
- Biggest defeat: 0–3 (May 7 at Phoenix Rising FC); 0–3 (August 6 at San Diego Loyal SC)
Home colors	Away colors

The 2022 San Antonio FC season was the club's seventh season of existence. Including the San Antonio Thunder of the original NASL and the former San Antonio Scorpions of the modern NASL, it was the 13th season of professional soccer in San Antonio. The club played in the USL Championship, the second division of the United States soccer league system, and participated in the U.S. Open Cup.

== Club ==
=== Coaching staff ===
Position	Staff
Head coach	(Canada) Alen Marcina
Assistant coach	(Croatia) Dario Pot
SAFC Pro Academy Director & Director of Goalkeeping	(Mexico) Juan Lamadrid
Academy coach	(United States) Oscar Munoz
Academy coach	(United States) Tim Chestney
Academy coach	(United States) Ryan Roushandel
Academy coach	(Colombia) Camilo Botero Fonseca
Equipment Manager	(United States) Rashad Moore
High Performance Coordinator	(United States) Sean Arters
Head athletic trainer	(United States) Jesse Lowrance
Assistant Athletic Trainer	(United States) Alex Saldana

Source: San Antonio FC

=== Other information ===
Owner	(United States) Spurs Sports & Entertainment
Chairman	(United States) Peter J. Holt
Managing Director	(United States) Tim Holt
Ground (capacity and dimensions)	Toyota Field (8,200 / 110x70 yards)
Training Ground	S.T.A.R. Soccer Complex

Source: San Antonio FC

== Squad information ==
=== First team squad ===
As of September 16, 2022.

Squad No.	Name	Nationality	Position(s)	Date of birth (age)
Goalkeepers
0	Grant Makela	(United States)	GK	May 6, 1998 (age 28)
1	Jordan Farr	(United States)	GK	October 5, 1994 (age 31)
50	Jude Bosshardt	(United States)	GK	April 19, 2005 (age 21)
Defenders
2	Carter Manley	(United States)	DF	April 29, 1996 (age 30)
3	Mitchell Taintor	(United States)	DF	September 11, 1994 (age 31)
4	Fabien Garcia	(France)	DF	July 14, 1994 (age 32)
7	Saad Abdul-Salaam	(United States)	DF	September 8, 1991 (age 34)
17	Jordan Ayimbila	(Ghana)	DF	January 15, 1999 (age 27)
22	Shannon Gomez	(Trinidad and Tobago)	DF	October 5, 1996 (age 29)
31	Connor Maloney	(United States)	DF	May 18, 1995 (age 31)
33	Jasser Khmiri	(Tunisia)	DF	July 27, 1997 (age 28)
52	Kibukila Mbula	(United States)	DF	April 24, 2006 (age 20)
56	Giovanni Padilla	(United States)	DF	March 23, 2006 (age 20)
Midfielders
5	Jordy Delem	(Martinique)	MF	March 18, 1993 (age 33)
6	PC	(Brazil)	MF	March 10, 1996 (age 30)
8	Deshane Beckford	(Jamaica)	MF	April 14, 1998 (age 28)
10	David Loera	(United States)	MF	September 10, 1998 (age 27)
19	Cristian Parano	(Argentina)	MF	August 16, 1999 (age 26)
25	Mohammed Abu	(Ghana)	MF	November 14, 1991 (age 34)
32	Ates Diouf	(Senegal)	MF	March 24, 2000 (age 26)
54	Henrik Sakshaug	(United States)	MF	January 19, 2005 (age 21)
57	Matthew Matsuzaki	(United States)	MF	February 21, 2005 (age 21)
80	Nicky Hernandez	(United States)	MF	September 21, 1998 (age 27)
Forwards
9	Santiago Patiño	(Colombia)	FW	March 10, 1997 (age 29)
11	Justin Dhillon	(United States)	FW	June 6, 1995 (age 31)
14	Samuel Adeniran	(United States)	FW	September 30, 1998 (age 27)
18	Elliot Collier	(New Zealand)	FW	February 22, 1995 (age 31)
20	Ignacio Bailone	(Argentina)	FW	January 20, 1994 (age 32)
27	Jack Lynn	(United States)	FW	January 12, 2000 (age 26)
53	Kai Louviere	(United States)	FW	November 20, 2004 (age 21)
55	Eduardo Fernandez	(United States)	FW	April 25, 2006 (age 20)

== Player movement ==
=== In ===
Pos	Player	Previous club	Fee	Date	Source
MF	(United States) Mitchell Taintor	(United States) Sacramento Republic FC	Undisclosed	January 4, 2022	
DF	(United States) Carter Manley	(United States) Rio Grande Valley FC Toros	Undisclosed	January 5, 2022	
FW	(New Zealand) Elliot Collier	(United States) Chicago Fire FC	Undisclosed	January 7, 2022	
MF	(United States) David Loera	(United States) Orlando City SC	Undisclosed	January 11, 2022	
DF	(Trinidad and Tobago) Shannon Gomez	(United States) Sacramento Republic FC	Undisclosed	January 13, 2022	
MF	(Senegal) Ates Diouf	(United States) Austin Bold FC	Undisclosed	January 19, 2022	
GK	(United States) Jordan Farr	(United States) Indy Eleven	Undisclosed	January 26, 2022	
GK	(Colombia) Cristian Bonilla	(Colombia) La Equidad	Undisclosed	January 27, 2022	
MF	(Jamaica) Deshane Beckford	(United States) Colorado Springs Switchbacks FC	Undisclosed	February 4, 2022	
DF	(France) Fabien Garcia	(United States) Austin Bold FC	Undisclosed	February 4, 2022	
FW	(The Gambia) Kekuta Manneh	(United States) Austin FC	Undisclosed	February 7, 2022	
DF	(France) Diedie Traore	(France) SAS Épinal	Undisclosed	February 24, 2022	
GK	(United States) Jude Bosshardt	(United States) SAFC Pro Academy	Undisclosed	March 8, 2022	
DF	(United States) Roman Holt	(United States) SAFC Pro Academy	Undisclosed	March 8, 2022	
DF	(United States) Kibukila Mbula	(United States) SAFC Pro Academy	Undisclosed	March 8, 2022	
FW	(United States) Kai Louviere	(United States) SAFC Pro Academy	Undisclosed	March 8, 2022	
MF	(United States) Henrik Sakshaug	(United States) SAFC Pro Academy	Undisclosed	March 8, 2022	
DF	(Tunisia) Jasser Khmiri	(Canada) Vancouver Whitecaps FC	Undisclosed	March 22, 2022	
FW	(United States) Eduardo Fernandez	(United States) SAFC Pro Academy	Undisclosed	April 5, 2022	
DF	(United States) Giovanni Padilla	(United States) SAFC Pro Academy	Undisclosed	April 5, 2022	
MF	(United States) Matthew Matsuzaki	(United States) SAFC Pro Academy	Undisclosed	April 5, 2022	
FW	(Argentina) Ignacio Bailone	(Croatia) HNK Šibenik	Undisclosed	May 18, 2022	
MF	(Martinique) Jordy Delem	(United States) Seattle Sounders FC	Undisclosed	May 19, 2022	
DF	(United States) Saad Abdul-Salaam	(United States) Columbus Crew	Undisclosed	June 22, 2022	
GK	(United States) Grant Makela	(United States) Des Moines Menace	Undisclosed	September 7, 2022	

=== Out ===
Pos	Player	Transferred To	Fee	Date	Source
MF	(United States) Marcus Epps	(United States) Phoenix Rising FC	Undisclosed	December 8, 2021	
MF	(United States) Cameron Lindley	(United States) Colorado Springs Switchbacks FC	Undisclosed	December 11, 2021	
MF	(Argentina) Emil Cuello	(United States) Sacramento Republic FC	Undisclosed	December 14, 2021	
MF	(United States) Ethan Bryant	(United States) Richmond Kickers	Undisclosed	December 14, 2021	
MF	(United States) Jose Gallegos	(Denmark) SønderjyskE Fodbold	Undisclosed	January 28, 2022	
GK	(Colombia) Cristian Bonilla	Retired	Undisclosed	March 31, 2022	
FW	(The Gambia) Kekuta Manneh	Mutual termination	Undisclosed	April 19, 2022	
DF	(France) Diedie Traore	Mutual termination	Undisclosed	June 30, 2022	
GK	(United States) Matt Cardone	Retired	Undisclosed	July 3, 2022	
DF	(United States) Roman Holt	(United States) Ocean City Nor'easters	Undisclosed	July 15, 2022	

=== Loan in ===
Pos	Player	Loaned From	Start	End	Source
DF	(Ghana) Jordan Ayimbila	(Ghana) Accra Lions FC	March 9, 2022	End of season	
MF	(United States) Nicky Hernandez	(United States) FC Dallas	April 13, 2022	End of season	
MF	(United States) Samuel Adeniran	(United States) Seattle Sounders FC	June 9, 2022	End of season	
MF	(Argentina) Cristian Parano	(Portugal) F.C. Paços de Ferreira	August 17, 2022	End of season	
FW	(United States) Jack Lynn	(United States) Orlando City SC	September 16, 2022	End of season	

=== Loan out ===
Pos	Player	Loaned To	Start	End	Source
MF	(United States) Leo Torres	(United States) Real Monarchs	February 1, 2022	End of season	

== Pre-season ==
The pre-season match vs FC Dallas was announced on January 6, 2022, by FCD. The remaining pre-season schedule was released on January 21, 2021, by SAFC.

February 12, 2022	FC Dallas	6–0	San Antonio FC	Frisco, Texas
1:00 PM CDT	Obrian 4', 6'; Ferreira 17' (pen.), 29', 33'; Arriola 68'	Report		Stadium: Toyota Stadium; Attendance: Closed-Door

February 20, 2022	San Antonio FC	2–1	Houston Dynamo 2	San Antonio, Texas
1:00 PM CDT	Patiño 5', 46' (Loera)	Report	Úlfarsson 87'	Stadium: Toyota Field; Attendance: Closed-Door

February 26, 2022	San Antonio FC	0–1	FC Tulsa	San Antonio, Texas
1:00 PM CDT		Report	Čuić 63'	Stadium: Toyota Field

March 5, 2022	San Antonio FC	0–7	El Paso Locomotive FC	San Antonio, Texas
1:00 PM CDT			Egiluz; Luna unknown François; Velásquez; Sonupe.	Stadium: Toyota Field; Attendance: Closed-Door
Note: San Antonio FC fielded members of their Pro Academy team

== Competitions ==
=== Overall ===
Position in the Western Conference

Competition	Started round	Final position / round	First match	Last match
USL Championship Western Conference	—	Winners	March 12, 2022	October 15, 2022
USL Championship Playoffs	Conference Semifinals	Winners	October 28, 2022	November 13, 2022
U.S. Open Cup	Second round	Round of 32	April 5, 2022	May 11, 2022

Updated to match played November 13, 2022
Source: Competitions

=== Overview ===
Competition	Record							
Competition	G	W	D	L	GF	GA	GD	Win %
USL Championship	34	24	5	5	54	26	+28	70.59
USL Championship Playoffs	3	3	0	0	8	1	+7	100.00
U.S. Open Cup	3	2	0	1	5	3	+2	66.67
Total	40	29	5	6	67	30	+37	72.50

Updated to match played November 13, 2022
Source: Competitions

=== USL Championship ===
==== Conference table ====
Western Conference

Pos	Team	Pld	W	L	T	GF	GA	GD	Pts	Qualification
1	San Antonio FC (C, X)	34	24	5	5	54	26	+28	77	Qualification for the Conference Semifinals
2	San Diego Loyal SC	34	18	10	6	68	55	+13	60	Playoffs
3	Colorado Springs Switchbacks	34	17	13	4	59	53	+6	55	Playoffs
4	Sacramento Republic	34	15	11	8	48	34	+14	53	Playoffs
5	New Mexico United	34	13	9	12	49	40	+9	51	Playoffs

Source: USL Championship Standings
(C) Champions; (X) Regular Season League Champion

==== Results summary ====
Overall								Home						Away					
Pld	W	D	L	GF	GA	GD	Pts	W	D	L	GF	GA	GD	W	D	L	GF	GA	GD
34	24	5	5	54	26	+28	77	11	5	1	31	11	+20	13	0	4	23	15	+8

Last updated: October 17, 2022.

==== Results by matchday ====
Position in the Western Conference

Round	1	2	3	4	5	6	7	8	9	10	11	12	13	14	15	16	17	18	19	20	21	22	23	24	25	26	27	28	29	30	31	32	33	34
Stadium	H	A	A	H	A	H	A	H	A	A	A	A	A	H	A	H	H	H	A	A	H	A	H	H	H	A	A	H	H	H	H	A	A	H
Result	W	W	W	L	W	W	W	W	L	W	W	L	W	D	W	W	W	W	W	W	D	L	W	W	D	L	W	W	D	W	W	W	W	D
Position	7	4	3	4	3	3	2	2	2	2	1	2	2	2	1	1	1	1	1	1	1	1	1	1	1	1	1	1	1	1	1	1	1	1

Updated to match(es) played on October 17, 2022. Source:
A = Away; H = Home; W = Win; D = Draw; L = Loss

==== Matches ====
The home opener vs Detroit City was announced on January 6, 2022. Home team is listed first, left to right.

Win Draw Loss Postponed

Kickoff times are in CDT (UTC-05) unless shown otherwise

March 12, 2022 1	San Antonio FC	1–0	Detroit City FC	San Antonio, Texas
7:30 p.m. CST	Abu (yellow card) 23'; Manley (yellow card) 26'; Garcia 68'; Dhillon (yellow card) 84'	Report	Hoppenot (yellow card) 10'; Dunwell (yellow card) 45'; Bryant (yellow card) 90+3'; Amoo-Mensah (yellow card) 90+5'	Stadium: Toyota Field; Attendance: 6,033; Referee: Elvis Osmanovic

March 19, 2022 2	LA Galaxy II	1–2	San Antonio FC	Carson, California
6:00 p.m. CST	González (yellow card) 13' (yellow-red card) 52'; Harvey 30'	Report	Loera 10'; Manley (yellow card) 35'; Garcia (yellow card) 39'; Taintor (yellow card) 50', (goal) 53'; Collier (red card) 55'	Stadium: Dignity Health Sports Park; Attendance: 500; Referee: DeShun Beard

March 27, 2022 3	Rio Grande Valley FC Toros	1–2	San Antonio FC	Edinburg, Texas
6:30 p.m. CST	Ruiz (yellow card) 18'; Borczak 44'; López (yellow card) 49'; Vázquez (yellow card) 89'	Report	Diouf (yellow card) 8'; Collier 34', (yellow card) 36'; Loera 45', (yellow card) 90'; Traore (yellow card) 53'; Ayimbila (yellow card) 78'; Garcia (yellow card) 86'	Stadium: H-E-B Park; Attendance: 3,759; Referee: Jeremy Scheer

April 2, 2022 4	San Antonio FC	0–2	Phoenix Rising FC	San Antonio, Texas
7:30 p.m. CST	King (yellow card) 14'; Repetto 56'; Epps 90+1'	Report	Traore (yellow card) 19'	Stadium: Toyota Field; Attendance: 5,511; Referee: Eric Tattersall

April 9, 2022 5	Orange County SC	0–1	San Antonio FC	Irvine, California
9:00 p.m. CST	Orozco (yellow card) 50'; Kuningas (yellow card) 90+7'	Report	PC (yellow card) 20'; Collier 60'; Traore (yellow card) 63'; Dhillon (yellow card) 90+1'; Gomez (yellow card) 90+6'	Stadium: Championship Soccer Stadium; Attendance: 4,167; Referee: Ricardo Fierro

April 16, 2022 6	San Antonio FC	1–0	El Paso Locomotive FC	San Antonio, Texas
7:30 p.m. CST	Collier 11'; PC (yellow card) 38'; Garcia (yellow card) 41'; Maloney (yellow card) 69'; Taintor (yellow card) 90+5'	Report	Brockbank (yellow card) 18'; Borelli (yellow card) 64'; Luna (yellow card) 90+7'	Stadium: Toyota Field; Attendance: 5,167; Referee: Luis Guardia

April 23, 2022 7	New Mexico United	0–1	San Antonio FC	Albuquerque, New Mexico
8:00 p.m. CDT	Tetteh (yellow card) 43'; Etaka (yellow card) 45+2'; Portillo (yellow card) 56'; Bruce (yellow card) 65'; Kiesewetter (yellow card) 89'	Report	Taintor (yellow card) 18'; Dhillon 67' (pen.); Garcia (yellow card) 84'	Stadium: Isotopes Park; Attendance: 11,420; Referee: Michael Radchuk

April 30, 2022 8	San Antonio FC	6–0	Monterey Bay FC	San Antonio, Texas
7:30 p.m. CST	Collier 21'; PC 25'; Hernandez 39'; Taintor 76'; Dhillon 83'; Ayimbila 90+2'	Report	Doner (yellow card) 43'; Murphy (yellow card) 65'	Stadium: Toyota Field; Attendance: 6,638; Referee: Katja Koroleva

May 7, 2022 9	Phoenix Rising FC	3–0	San Antonio FC	Chandler, Arizona
9:30 p.m. CST	Hurst 26', 34', (yellow card) 88'; Moar (yellow card) 45+3'; Epps (yellow card) 45+3'; Njie (yellow card) 64' (yellow-red card) 72'; Antwi (yellow card) 86', (goal) 90+5'	Report	Taintor (yellow card) 47'; Abu (yellow card) 54'	Stadium: Wild Horse Pass Stadium; Attendance: 6,486; Referee: Calin Radosav

May 14, 2022 10	Miami FC	0–2	San Antonio FC	University Park, Florida
6:00 p.m. CST	Murphy (yellow card) 36'; Antonelli (yellow card) 61'; Ofeimu (yellow card) 90+4'	Report	Khmiri (yellow card) 39'; Beckford 41', (yellow card) 51'; Diouf (yellow card) 63'; Taintor (yellow card) 68', (goal) 90+5' (pen.); PC (yellow card) 77'	Stadium: Riccardo Silva Stadium; Attendance: 1,307; Referee: Gerald Flores

May 21, 2022	San Antonio FC	PP	Colorado Springs Switchbacks FC	San Antonio, Texas
7:30 p.m. CST				Stadium: Toyota Field
Note: Postponed after multiple covered individuals from San Antonio tested positive for COVID-19.

May 28, 2022 11	Rio Grande Valley FC Toros	2–3	San Antonio FC	Edinburg, Texas
7:30 p.m. CST	Cabezas 41'; Ycaza (yellow card) 56'; López (yellow card) 71'; Hernández (yellow card) 76'; Pimentel (red card) 77'; Ackwei (yellow card) 79'; Malešević (yellow card) 80'; Herrera 90+2'	Report	Dhillon 26', (yellow card) 31', (goal) 87'; Traore (yellow card) 31'; Garcia (yellow card) 43'; Khmiri (yellow card) 45+5'; Taintor 62', (yellow card) 79'; Delem (yellow card) 89'	Stadium: H-E-B Park; Attendance: 3,053; Referee: Melvin Rivas

June 4, 2022 12	Sacramento Republic FC	1–0	San Antonio FC	Sacramento, California
10:00 p.m. CDT	Martínez 37'; Felipe (yellow card) 45+1'; López (yellow card) 72'	Report	Garcia (yellow card) 19' (yellow-red card) 90'; PC (yellow card) 42'; Beckford (yellow card) 45+2'	Stadium: Heart Health Park; Attendance: 9,641; Referee: Michael Radchuk

June 11, 2022 13	Monterey Bay FC	2–3	San Antonio FC	Seaside, California
5:00 p.m. CDT	Volesky 18', (yellow card) 52'; Delem 68' (o.g.); Roberts (yellow card) 90+1' (yellow-red card) 90+4'	Report	Dhillon (yellow card) 3', (goal) 43'; Maloney (yellow card) 22'; Strong 39' (o.g.); Delem (yellow card) 60'; Beckford (yellow card) 70'; Patiño 82', (yellow card) 90'; PC (yellow card) 90+1'	Stadium: Cardinale Stadium; Attendance: 3,110; Referee: Ricardo Fierro

June 18, 2022 14	San Antonio FC	1–1	Oakland Roots SC	San Antonio, Texas
8:00 p.m. CST	Khmiri (yellow card) 44'; Adeniran 45+1'; Taintor (yellow card) 86'; Farr (yellow card) 90+2'	Report	Nane (yellow card) 14', (goal) 29'; Formella (yellow card) 37'; Fissore (yellow card) 90+6'; Hernández (yellow card) 90+7'	Stadium: Toyota Field; Attendance: 5,563; Referee: Brad Jensen

June 24, 2022 15	Colorado Springs Switchbacks FC	0–1	San Antonio FC	Colorado Springs, Colorado
8:00 p.m. CDT	Makangila (yellow card) 25'; Echevarria (yellow card) 85'; Mahoney (yellow card) 85'	Report	Khmiri (yellow card) 18'; Maloney (yellow card) 35'; Mahoney 48' (o.g.); PC (yellow card) 90+8'	Stadium: Weidner Field; Attendance: 6,733; Referee: Matthew Conger

June 28, 2022 16	San Antonio FC	2–1	FC Tulsa	San Antonio, Texas
8:00 p.m. CST	Diouf (yellow card) 44'; Bailone 55'; Adeniran 57'; Abu (yellow card) 79'	Report	Torres (yellow card) 31'; Williams 36'; Obinwa (yellow card) 52'; McFarlane (yellow card) 76'	Stadium: Toyota Field; Attendance: 5,015; Referee: Matthew Thompson

July 2, 2022 17	San Antonio FC	2–0	Charleston Battery	San Antonio, Texas
8:00 p.m. CST	Patiño 29'; Khmiri (yellow card) 31'; Bailone 66'	Report	Pérez Oquendo (yellow card) 24'; Sheldon (yellow card) 70'; Piggott (yellow card) 85'; Kwakwa (yellow card) 88'	Stadium: Toyota Field; Attendance: 7,044; Referee: Gerald Flores

July 16, 2022 18	San Antonio FC	5–0	Atlanta United 2	San Antonio, Texas
8:00 p.m. CST	Adeniran 13', 51'; Patiño 16', 33' (pen.); Maloney (yellow card) 20'; PC (yellow card) 65'; Dhillon (penalty missed) 71', 88'	Report	Centeno (yellow card) 58'; Reyes (yellow card) 71'	Stadium: Toyota Field; Attendance: 5,716; Referee: Abdou Ndiaye

July 23, 2022 19	El Paso Locomotive FC	0–1	San Antonio FC	El Paso, Texas
8:30 p.m. CDT	Yuma (yellow card) 43'; Gómez (yellow card) 83'; Azcona (yellow card) 88'	Report	Abdul-Salaam (yellow card) 11'; Patiño 47'; Abu (yellow card) 74'; Gomez (yellow card) 81'	Stadium: Southwest University Park; Attendance: 6,333; Referee: Ricardo Fierro

July 27, 2022 20	Las Vegas Lights FC	0–2	San Antonio FC	Las Vegas, Nevada
9:30 p.m. CDT		Report	Abdul-Salaam (yellow card) 11', (goal) 34'; Patiño (yellow card) 53'; Hernandez (yellow card) 58'; Adeniran 64', (yellow card) 85'	Stadium: Cashman Field; Referee: Jervis Atagana

July 30, 2022 21	San Antonio FC	1–1	LA Galaxy II	San Antonio, Texas
8:00 p.m. CDT	Taintor (yellow card) 37'; Patiño (red card) 62'; Gomez (yellow card) 64', (goal) 90+5'; PC (yellow card) 77'; Dhillon (yellow card) 88'	Report	Campbell (yellow card) 18'; Harvey (yellow card) 61'; Saldana (yellow card) 62'; Drack 87'; Judd (yellow card) 90+4'	Stadium: Toyota Field; Attendance: 6,281; Referee: Jeremy Scheer

August 6, 2022 22	San Diego Loyal SC	3–0	San Antonio FC	San Diego, California
9:00 p.m. CDT	Guido (yellow card) 3'; Conway 65', (yellow card) 76'; Stoneman 72'; Vassell 77'; Adams (yellow card) 88'	Report	Garcia (yellow card) 24'; Hernandez (yellow card) 68'	Stadium: Torero Stadium; Attendance: 4,756; Referee: Brandon Stevis
Note: 200th USL league match

August 10, 2022 23	San Antonio FC	2–1	Loudoun United FC	San Antonio, Texas
8:00 p.m. CDT	Adeniran 10', 51'; Taintor (yellow card) 45+3'	Report	Zanne (yellow card) 18'; Nyeman 45'; Diarra (yellow card) 75'	Stadium: Toyota Field; Attendance: 4,297; Referee: Melvin Rivas

August 13, 2022 24	San Antonio FC	2–0	Las Vegas Lights FC	San Antonio, Texas
8:00 p.m. CDT	Hernandez 34'; Lara 45+1' (o.g.); Dhillon (yellow card) 53'; PC (yellow card) 90+3'	Report	Lara (yellow card) 45'; Daroma (yellow card) 83'	Stadium: Toyota Field; Attendance: 5,521; Referee: Adam Kilpatrick

August 20, 2022 25	San Antonio FC	2–2	Rio Grande Valley FC Toros	San Antonio, Texas
8:00 p.m. CDT	Khmiri (yellow card) 17'; Abu (yellow card) 18'; Farr (yellow card) 43'; Adeniran (yellow card) 45'; Maloney (yellow card) 53'; Gomez 59'; Bailone (yellow card) 84'; Taintor (yellow card) 90', (goal) 90+6'	Report	Pinzon 34'; Ward 36', (yellow card) 90+5'; Ycaza (yellow card) 80'; Coronado (yellow card) 90+9' (yellow-red card) 90+10'	Stadium: Toyota Field; Attendance: 6,511; Referee: Greg Dopka

August 27, 2022 26	Indy Eleven	1–0	San Antonio FC	Indianapolis, Indiana
6:00 p.m. CDT	Tejada (yellow card) 14'; Dambrot 40'; Brown (yellow card) 45+4'; Trilk (yellow card) 90+8'	Report	Khmiri (yellow card) 79'; Abu (yellow card) 86'	Stadium: Michael A. Carroll Stadium; Attendance: 10,081; Referee: Calin Radosav

September 3, 2022 27	Oakland Roots SC	0–2	San Antonio FC	Oakland, California
9:00 p.m. CDT	Mfeka (yellow card) 23'; Diaz (yellow card) 90+3'	Report	Adeniran 5', 85'; PC (yellow card) 22'; Patiño (yellow card) 65'; Khmiri (yellow card) 67'	Stadium: Laney College Football Stadium; Attendance: 5,093; Referee: Elvis Osmanovic

September 10, 2022 28	San Antonio FC	1–0	San Diego Loyal SC	San Antonio, Texas
7:30 p.m. CDT	Bailone 30'; Taintor (yellow card) 45+1'	Report	Stoneman (yellow card) 79'; Blake (yellow card) 82'	Stadium: Toyota Field; Attendance: 7,019; Referee: Elijio Arreguin

September 17, 2022 29	San Antonio FC	1–1	New Mexico United	San Antonio, Texas
7:30 p.m. CDT	Bailone 54'; Manley (yellow card) 69'; Adeniran (yellow card) 71'	Report	Portillo (yellow card) 20'; Wehan 66'; Frater (yellow card) 74'; Hamilton (yellow card) 81'; Swartz (yellow card) 85'	Stadium: Toyota Field; Attendance: 6,019; Referee: Brad Jensen

September 20, 2022 30	San Antonio FC	1–0	Colorado Springs Switchbacks FC	San Antonio, Texas
7:30 p.m. CST	Khmiri (yellow card) 23'; PC 76'; Baillone (yellow card) 86'	Report	Erdmann (yellow card) 14'; Edwards (yellow card) 45'; Hodge (yellow card) 55'; Amoh (yellow card) 74'	Stadium: Toyota Field; Attendance: 5,113; Referee: Elvis Osmanovic
Note: Rescheduled match from May 21, 2022.

September 24, 2022 31	San Antonio FC	1–0	Sacramento Republic FC	San Antonio, Texas
7:30 p.m. CST	Adeniran 17'; PC (yellow card) 27'; Maloney (yellow card) 33'; Gomez (yellow card) 45+4' (yellow-red card) 84'; Taintor (yellow card) 74'	Report	López (yellow card) 30'; Foster (yellow card) 50'; Ross (yellow card) 62'; Martínez (yellow card) 69'; Archimède (yellow card) 90+6'	Stadium: Toyota Field; Attendance: 6,205; Referee: Mathew Corrigan

October 1, 2022 32	Pittsburgh Riverhounds SC	0–1	San Antonio FC	Pittsburgh, Pennsylvania
6:00 p.m. CST	Osuna (yellow card) 90+3'	Report	Delem (yellow card) 18'; Manley 86'	Stadium: Highmark Stadium; Attendance: 3,045; Referee: Thomas Snyder

October 9, 2022 33	Birmingham Legion FC	1–2	San Antonio FC	Birmingham, Alabama
4:00 p.m. CST	Marlon 19' (pen.), (yellow card) 54'; Rufe (yellow card) 90'	Report	Bailone 41'; Patiño 84'; Hernandez (yellow card) 90+3'	Stadium: Protective Stadium; Referee: Sergii Demianchuk

October 15, 2022 34	San Antonio FC	2–2	Orange County SC	San Antonio, Texas
7:30 p.m. CST	Bailone 43'; Gomez (yellow card) 45+3'; Parano 46'; Khmiri (yellow card) 61'; Farr (yellow card) 90'; PC (yellow card) 90+3'	Report	Richards (yellow card) 12'; Miles (yellow card) 14'; Iloski 25'; Orozco 45+1'; Torres (yellow card) 45+3'; McCabe (yellow card) 90'	Stadium: Toyota Field; Attendance: 8,015; Referee: Danielle Chesky

=== USL Championship Playoffs ===
On August 27, 2022, San Antonio clinched a spot in the 2022 USL Championship Playoffs. On October 1, San Antonio secured the best record in the USL Championship regular season, guaranteeing home-field advantage throughout the playoffs.

October 28, 2022 Conference Semifinals	San Antonio FC	3–0	Oakland Roots SC	San Antonio, Texas
7:30 p.m. CDT	Adeniran 2'; Khmiri (yellow card) 20'; Garcia (yellow card) 56'; Patiño 75', 90'	Report	Barbir (yellow card) 52'; Rodriguez (yellow card) 78'; Rito (yellow card) 89'; Hernández (yellow card) 89'	Stadium: Toyota Field; Attendance: 8,208; Referee: Elvis Osmanovic

November 6, 2022 Conference Final	San Antonio FC	2–0	Colorado Springs Switchbacks FC	San Antonio, Texas
7:30 p.m. CDT	Maloney 23'; Parano (yellow card) 66'; Adeniran (yellow card) 75'; Patiño (yellow card) 90+2', (goal) 90+11'	Report	Ngalina (yellow card) 10'; Hodge (yellow card) 49'; Henríquez (yellow card) 54'; Wheeler (yellow card) 78'; Herrera (yellow card) 87'; Mahoney (yellow card) 89'	Stadium: Toyota Field; Attendance: 8,245; Referee: Kevin Broadley

November 13, 2022 USL Championship Final	San Antonio FC	3–1	Louisville City FC	San Antonio, Texas
7:30 p.m. CDT	Garcia (yellow card) 47'; Patiño 45+3' (pen.), 70'; Delem (yellow card) 62'; Adeniran 64'	Report	Lancaster (yellow card) 44'; Faundez (yellow card) 61'; Ownby 78'; Mushagalusa (yellow card) 80'	Stadium: Toyota Field; Attendance: 8,534; Referee: Elvis Osmanovic; MVP: Santiago Patiño

=== Lamar Hunt U.S. Open Cup ===
April 5, 2022 Second round	San Antonio FC (Texas)	3–1	(Texas) D'Feeters Kicks Soccer Club	San Antonio, Texas
7:30 p.m. CDT	Sakshaug 53', 57'; Maloney 54'	Report	Ojeda (yellow card) 27'; Ramirez (yellow card) 39' (yellow-red card) 83'; Mendez 61'	Stadium: Toyota Field; Attendance: 2,145

April 20, 2022 Third Round	San Antonio FC (Texas)	2–1 (a.e.t.)	(Texas) Austin FC	San Antonio, Texas
8:00 p.m. CDT	Collier (yellow card) 16', (goal) 82'; Gomez (yellow card) 45+1'; Abu (yellow card) 89'; Manley 96'; Sakshaug (yellow card) 120+3'; Farr (yellow card) 120+4'	Report	Jiménez (yellow card) 36'; Fagúndez 47'; Kolmanič (yellow card) 90+5'	Stadium: Toyota Field; Attendance: 7,922

May 11, 2022 Round of 32	Houston Dynamo FC (Texas)	1–0	(Texas) San Antonio FC	Houston, Texas
7:30 p.m. CDT	Picault (yellow card) 42'; Ferreira 82'	Report	Abu (yellow card) 40'; Garcia (yellow card) 42'; Taintor (yellow card) 76'	Stadium: PNC Stadium; Referee: Nima Saghafi

=== Exhibition ===
On May 10, 2022, it was announced that San Antonio would host Liga MX side Atlético San Luis for an international friendly.

June 14, 2021 Friendly	San Antonio FC (United States)	0–4	(Mexico) Atlético San Luis	San Antonio, Texas
8:00 p.m. CDT		Report	5' (pen.); 17'; 45'; 90'	Stadium: Toyota Field

== Statistics ==
=== Appearances ===
Discipline includes league, playoffs, and Open Cup play.

No.	Pos.	Name	League		Playoffs		U.S. Open Cup		Total		Discipline	
No.	Pos.	Name	Apps	Goals	Apps	Goals	Apps	Goals	Apps	Goals	Yellow card	Red card
0	GK	(United States) Grant Makela	0	0	0	0	0	0	0	0	0	0
1	GK	(United States) Jordan Farr	31	0	3	0	2	0	35	0	4	0
2	DF	(United States) Carter Manley	21 (2)	1	2 (1)	0	1 (1)	1	24 (4)	2	3	0
3	DF	(United States) Mitchell Taintor	30	5	3	0	2	0	36	5	13	0
4	DF	(France) Fabien Garcia	25 (1)	1	3	0	2	0	30 (1)	1	9	0
5	MF	(Martinique) Jordy Delem	6 (10)	0	3	0	0	0	9 (10)	0	4	0
6	MF	(Brazil) PC	27 (1)	2	1	0	2 (1)	0	30 (2)	2	12	0
7	DF	(United States) Saad Abdul-Salaam	8 (3)	1	0 (1)	0	0	0	8 (4)	1	2	0
8	MF	(Jamaica) Deshane Beckford	4 (9)	1	0	0	1 (1)	0	5 (10)	1	2	0
9	FW	(Colombia) Santiago Patiño	12 (5)	6	3	5	0 (1)	0	15 (6)	11	4	1
10	MF	(United States) David Loera	7 (6)	2	0	0	0 (1)	0	7 (7)	2	1	0
11	MF	(United States) Justin Dhillon	24 (2)	6	1 (2)	0	3	0	28 (4)	6	6	0
14	FW	(United States) Samuel Adeniran	18 (2)	10	3	2	0	0	21 (2)	12	4	0
17	DF	(Ghana) Jordan Ayimbila	1 (7)	1	0	0	2	0	3 (7)	1	1	0
18	FW	(New Zealand) Elliot Collier	14 (8)	4	0 (1)	0	2	1	16 (9)	5	2	1
19	MF	(Argentina) Cristian Parano	9 (1)	1	2 (1)	0	0	0	11 (2)	1	1	0
20	FW	(Argentina) Ignacio Bailone	6 (16)	6	0 (3)	0	0	0	6 (19)	6	2	0
22	DF	(Trinidad and Tobago) Shannon Gomez	19 (11)	2	3	0	1 (1)	0	23 (12)	2	5	1
25	MF	(Ghana) Mohammed Abu	25 (4)	0	1	0	2	0	28 (4)	0	8	0
27	FW	(United States) Jack Lynn	2 (3)	0	0	0	0	0	2 (3)	0	0	0
31	DF	(United States) Connor Maloney	33	0	3	1	1 (2)	1	37 (2)	2	6	0
32	MF	(Senegal) Ates Diouf	5 (6)	0	0	0	0 (1)	0	5 (7)	0	3	0
33	DF	(Tunisia) Jasser Khmiri	23	0	2	0	2	0	26	0	11	0
50	GK	(United States) Jude Bosshardt	0	0	0	0	0	0	0	0	0	0
52	DF	(United States) Kibukila Mbula	0	0	0	0	0	0	0	0	0	0
53	FW	(United States) Kai Louviere	0	0	0	0	1	0	1	0	0	0
54	MF	(United States) Henrik Sakshaug	0 (1)	0	0	0	1 (1)	2	1 (2)	2	1	0
55	FW	(United States) Eduardo Fernandez	0	0	0	0	0 (1)	0	0 (1)	0	0	0
56	DF	(United States) Giovanni Padilla	0	0	0	0	1	0	1	0	0	0
56	MF	(United States) Mathhew Matsuzaki	0	0	0	0	0	0	0	0	0	0
80	MF	(United States) Nicky Hernandez	11 (12)	2	0	0	2	0	13 (12)	2	2	0
Players who left the club
	GK	(Colombia) Cristian Bonilla	3	0	0	0	0	0	3	0	0	0
	GK	(United States) Matt Cardone	0 (1)	0	0	0	1	0	1 (1)	0	0	0
	DF	(United States) Roman Holt	0	0	0	0	1 (1)	0	1 (1)	0	0	0
	FW	(The Gambia) Kekuta Manneh	0	0	0	0	0	0	0	0	0	0
	DF	(France) Diedie Traore	8 (3)	0	0	0	0 (1)	0	8 (4)	0	4	0

Last updated: November 13, 2022.
Source: San Antonio FC

=== Top scorers ===
The list is sorted by shirt number when total goals are equal.

Rnk	Pos	No.	Player	League	Playoffs	U.S. Open Cup	Total
1	FW	14	(United States) Samuel Adeniran	10	2	0	12
2	FW	9	(Colombia) Santiago Patiño	6	5	0	11
3	FW	11	(United States) Justin Dhillon	6	0	0	6
4	DF	3	(United States) Mitchell Taintor	5	0	0	5
4	FW	18	(New Zealand) Elliot Collier	4	0	1	5
4	FW	20	(Argentina) Ignacio Bailone	5	0	0	5
7	DF	2	(United States) Carter Manley	1	0	1	2
7	MF	6	(Brazil) PC	2	0	0	2
7	MF	10	(United States) David Loera	2	0	0	2
7	DF	22	(Trinidad and Tobago) Shannon Gomez	2	0	0	2
7	DF	31	(United States) Connor Maloney	0	1	1	2
7	MF	54	(United States) Henrik Sakshaug	0	0	2	2
7	MF	80	(United States) Nicky Hernandez	2	0	0	2
14	DF	4	(France) Fabien Garcia	1	0	0	1
14	MF	7	(United States) Saad Abdul-Salaam	1	0	0	1
14	MF	8	(Jamaica) Deshane Beckford	1	0	0	1
14	DF	17	(Ghana) Jordan Ayimbila	1	0	0	1
14	MF	19	(Argentina) Cristian Parano	1	0	0	1
#	Own goals			3	0	0	3
TOTALS				54	8	5	67

Last updated: November 13, 2022.
Source: San Antonio FC

=== Clean sheets ===
The list is sorted by shirt number when total clean sheets are equal.

Rnk	No.	Player	League	Playoffs	U.S. Open Cup	Total
1	1	(United States) Jordan Farr	15	2	0	17
2	23	(Colombia) Cristian Bonilla	1	0	0	1
TOTALS			16	2	0	18

Last updated: November 13, 2022.
Source: San Antonio FC

=== Summary ===
Games played	40 (34 USL Championship) (3 USL Championship Playoffs) (3 U.S. Open Cup)
Games won	29 (24 USL Championship) (3 USL Championship Playoffs) (2 U.S. Open Cup)
Games drawn	5 (5 USL Championship) (0 USL Championship Playoffs) (0 U.S. Open Cup)
Games lost	6 (5 USL Championship) (0 USL Championship Playoffs) (1 U.S. Open Cup)
Goals scored	67 (54 USL Championship) (8 USL Championship Playoffs) (5 U.S. Open Cup)
Goals conceded	30 (26 USL Championship) (1 USL Championship Playoffs) (3 U.S. Open Cup)
Goal difference	+37 (+28 USL Championship) (+7 USL Championship Playoffs) (+2 U.S. Open Cup)
Clean sheets	19 (17 USL Championship) (2 USL Championship Playoffs) (0 U.S. Open Cup)
Yellow cards	113 (98 USL Championship) (7 USL Championship Playoffs) (8 U.S. Open Cup)
Red cards	4 (4 USL Championship) (0 USL Championship Playoffs) (0 U.S. Open Cup)
Most appearances	(United States) Connor Maloney (39 appearances)
Top scorer	(United States) Samuel Adeniran (12 goals)
Winning Percentage	Overall: 29/40 (72.5%)

Last updated: November 13, 2022.
Source: San Antonio FC

== Awards ==
=== Player ===
No.	Player	Award	Week/Month	Source
3	(United States) Mitchell Taintor	Championship Team of the Week	Week 2	
1	(United States) Jordan Farr	Championship Save of the Week	Week 4	
1	(United States) Jordan Farr	Championship Save of the Week	Week 5	
1	(United States) Jordan Farr	Championship Team of the Week	Week 5	
3	(United States) Mitchell Taintor	Championship Team of the Week	Week 5	
4	(France) Fabien Garcia	Championship Team of the Week	Week 6	
18	(New Zealand) Elliot Collier	Championship Goal of the Week	Week 6	
1	(United States) Jordan Farr	Championship Team of the Week	Week 7	
1	(United States) Jordan Farr	Championship Save of the Week	Week 7	
3	(United States) Mitchell Taintor	Championship Team of the Week	Week 8	
4	(France) Fabien Garcia	Championship Team of the Week	Week 8	
80	(United States) Nicky Hernandez	Championship Team of the Week	Week 8	
1	(United States) Jordan Farr	Championship Player of the Month	April	
3	(United States) Mitchell Taintor	Championship Team of the Week	Week 10	
3	(United States) Mitchell Taintor	Championship Team of the Week	Week 12	
11	(United States) Justin Dhillon	Championship Team of the Week	Week 12	
6	(Brazil) PC	Championship Team of the Week	Week 14	
1	(United States) Jordan Farr	Championship Save of the Week	Week 14	
4	(France) Fabien Garcia	Championship Team of the Week	Week 19	
25	(Ghana) Mohammed Abu	Championship Team of the Week	Week 19	
1	(United States) Jordan Farr	Championship Save of the Week	Week 19	
1	(United States) Jordan Farr	Championship Save of the Week	Week 20	
14	(United States) Samuel Adeniran	Championship Team of the Week	Week 23	
80	(United States) Nicky Hernandez	Championship Team of the Week	Week 23	
80	(United States) Nicky Hernandez	Championship Goal of the Week	Week 23	
14	(United States) Samuel Adeniran	Championship Team of the Week	Week 26	
80	(United States) Nicky Hernandez	Championship Goal of the Month	August	
1	(United States) Jordan Farr	Championship Team of the Week	Week 27	
1	(United States) Jordan Farr	Championship Team of the Week	Week 29	
14	(United States) Samuel Adeniran	Championship Team of the Week	Week 29	
2	(United States) Carter Manley	Championship Team of the Week	Week 30	
1	(United States) Jordan Farr	Championship Player of the Month	September	
End of Season Awards
1	(United States) Jordan Farr	2022 USL Championship All-League First Team	November	
3	(United States) Mitchell Taintor	2022 USL Championship All-League First Team	November	
1	(United States) Jordan Farr	2022 USL Championship Goalkeeper of the Year	November	
3	(United States) Mitchell Taintor	2022 USL Championship Defender of the Year	November	
9	(Colombia) Santiago Patiño	2022 USL Championship Final Most Valuable Player	November	
1	(United States) Jordan Farr	2022 USL Championship Save of the Playoffs	November	
