= George Slefendorfas =

Papua New Guinean association footballer (born 1983)

Personal information
- Full name: George Slefendorfas
- Date of birth: 7 January 1983 (age 43)
- Place of birth: Port Moresby, Papua New Guinea
- Height: 1.83 m (6 ft 0 in)
- Position: Striker

Team information
- Current team: Werribee City FC
- Number: 9

Youth career
- Marlin Coast Rangers
- Edge Hill FC
- Stratford

Senior career*
Years	Team	Apps	(Gls)
2007	Marlin Coast Rangers	?	(3)
2008–2009	Dalkurd FF	?	(?)
2010	Heidelberg United	13	(4)
2011	Sunshine George Cross	3	(5)
2011–2012	Canterbury United	13	(13)
2012	Waitakere United	2	(1)
2013	WaiBOP United	2	(0)
2014–2015	Bendigo FC	38	(17)
2016	Whittlesea Ranges	26	(14)
2017–2018	Werribee City FC		
2019–	Whittlesea Ranges		

International career^{‡}
2014–	Papua New Guinea	1	(0)
- * Club domestic league appearances and goals as of 29 November 2013 ‡ National team caps and goals as of 15 September 2015

George Slefendorfas (born 7 January 1983) is a Papua New Guinean association footballer, who currently plays for Whittlesea Ranges FC in the National Premier Leagues Victoria 2. Besides Australia, he has played in Sweden and New Zealand. He is of Lithuanian and Papua New Guinean heritage. He played for Papua New Guinea.

== Career ==
Born in Papua New Guinea, Slefendorfas' family moved to Australia when he 8 years old, settling in the far North Queensland city of Cairns, Queensland. After playing for a few different clubs around Cairns, he moved to Sweden to play for then Swedish Division Three club Dalkurd FF. Before heading to Sweden, Slefendorfas helped the Rangers to an emphatic 8–0 victory over the Mareeba Bulls in the 2008 FNQ Division One Grand Final, scoring a hat trick.

Returning to Australia, Slefendorfas signed with Victorian Premier League club Heidelberg United in 2010, before moving on to the Victorian State League Division 1 club Sunshine George Cross FC in 2011.

After making some inquiries with Papua New Guinean legend Reggie Davani who he played alongside at Sunshine George Cross, Slefendorfas got in touch with Canterbury United coach Keith Braithwaite who signed him for the 2011–12 ASB Premiership season.

Slefendorfas made an excellent debut for Canterbury United against 2010–11 season wooden spooners YoungHeart Manawatu, scoring a brace in their 4–0 victory on the opening weekend of the season. Round 2 would provide more goals and excitement from him, as Canterbury United put Waikato FC to the sword 5–0, with Slefendorfas scoring 4 goals, to take his tally to 6 after only two games.

== Honours ==
Far North Queensland Division One

- 2008: Marlin Coast Rangers: Champions
