= Eder Franchini =

Chilean footballer

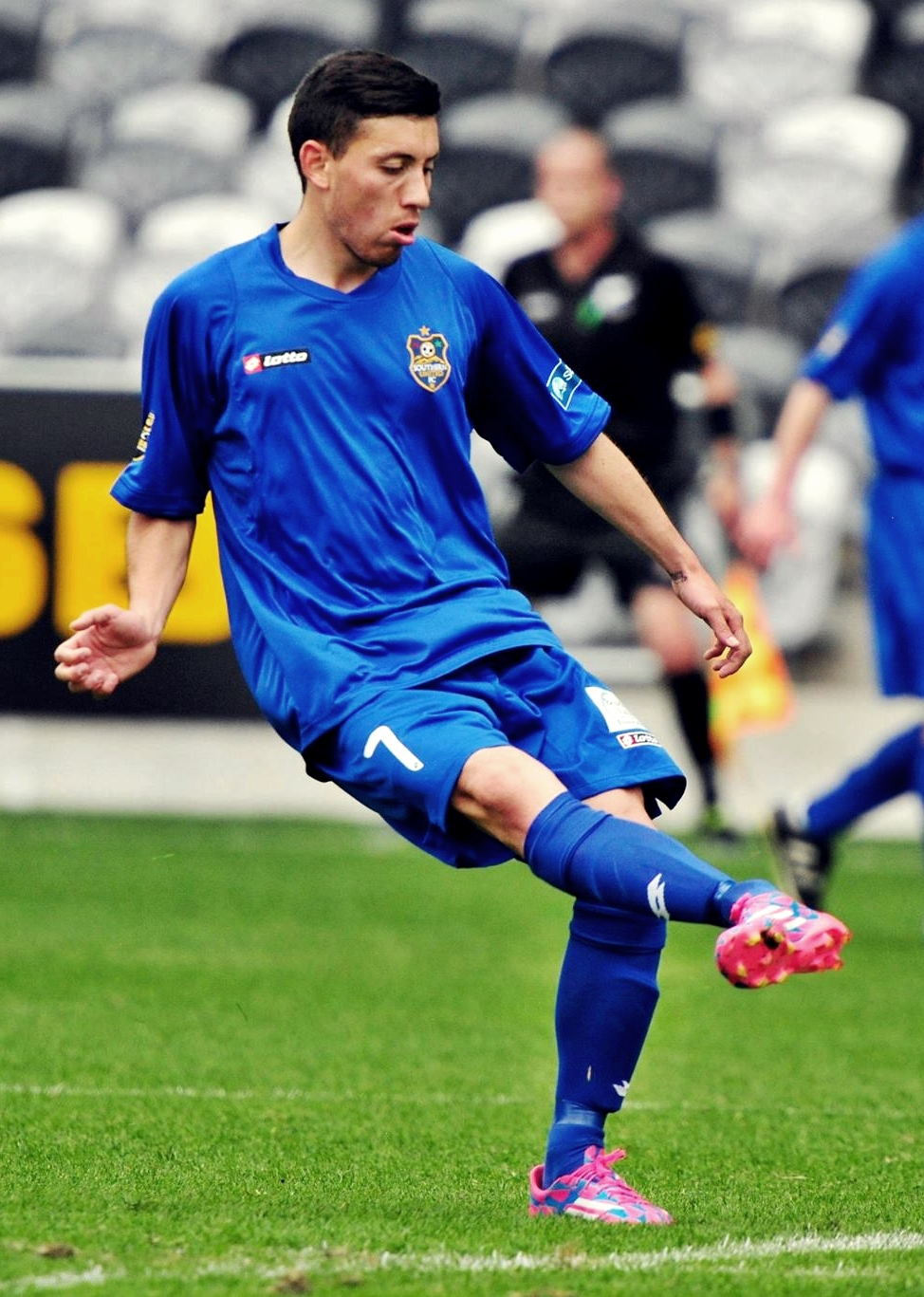

Personal information
- Full name: Eder Giovanni Franchini Pastén
- Date of birth: 26 July 1988 (age 38)
- Place of birth: Santiago, Chile
- Height: 1.73 m (5 ft 8 in)
- Position: Defensive midfielder

Team information
- Current team: Ngaruawahia United
- Number: 15

Youth career
- 2001–2006: Huachipato
- 2007: Universidad de Concepción

Senior career*
Years	Team	Apps	(Gls)
2012	Manukau City		
2012	Onehunga Sports		
2012–2013	Waikato FC	13	(2)
2013–2014	Hamilton Wanderers		
2014	Deportes Concepción (futsal)		
2014–2015	Southern United	10	(0)
2015–2018	Waitakere United	42	(3)
2017	→ Glenfield Rovers (loan)		
2018–2020	Glenfield Rovers		
2020–2021	Manukau United		
2021	West Coast Rangers	4	(0)
2021–2022	Manurewa AFC		
2022	Ngaruawahia United		

International career
2008	Chile (futsal)		
- * Club domestic league appearances and goals as of 28 February 2023

Eder Giovanni Franchini Pastén (born 26 July 1988) is a Chilean footballer who plays as a defensive midfielder. Besides Chile, he has played in New Zealand.

== Career ==
As a youth player, Franchini was with Huachipato and Universidad de Concepción until 2007. After having no chances to play professional football in his homeland, he switched to futsal, also representing the Chile national team in the 2008 Copa América.

In 2012, he emigrated to New Zealand and began a football career by signing with Manukau City. He has had an extensive career in that country, playing for clubs such as Waikato FC, Hamilton Wanderers, coinciding with his compatriot Alexis Cárcamo, Southern United, Waitakere United, Glenfield Rovers, among others. In the New Zealand football, he also coincided with another compatriots such as Nicolas Zambrano and Martín Canales.

In 2014, he returned to Chile for a brief stint and played for the Deportes Concepción futsal team in the Copa Libertadores, coinciding with Bernardo Araya, the most successful Chilean futsal player. At the tournament, they got a historical win against Uruguayan club Peñarol.

In April 2022, he signed with Ngaruawahia United.

== Personal life ==
At the same time he was a player of Waitakere United, he worked as a painter in a his friends' company. He made his home in Auckland, New Zealand, and started a painting company in 2019.
