= 2011–12 New Zealand Football Championship =

ASB Premiership
- Season: 2011–12
- Champions: Waitakere United
- Premiers: Auckland City
- OFC Champions League: Waitakere United; Auckland City
- Matches: 61
- Goals: 248 (4.07 per match)
- Top goalscorer: George Slefendorfas (12)
- Biggest home win: Canterbury United 9–1 YoungHeart Manawatu (Round 8)
- Biggest away win: Otago United 0–6 Waitakere United (Round 2); YoungHeart Manawatu 0–6 Auckland City FC (Round 11)
- Highest scoring: Canterbury United 9–1 YoungHeart Manawatu (Round 8)

The New Zealand Football Championship's 2011–12 season (known as the ASB Premiership for sponsorship reasons) will be the eighth season of the NZFC since its establishment in 2004. The home and away season will begin on 22 October 2011. Waitakere United and Auckland City will represent the ASB Premiership in the 2011–12 OFC Champions League after finishing Premiers and runners up respectively in the 2009–10 competition.

== Clubs ==
As in the previous season, eight clubs participated in the league.

=== Stadia and locations ===
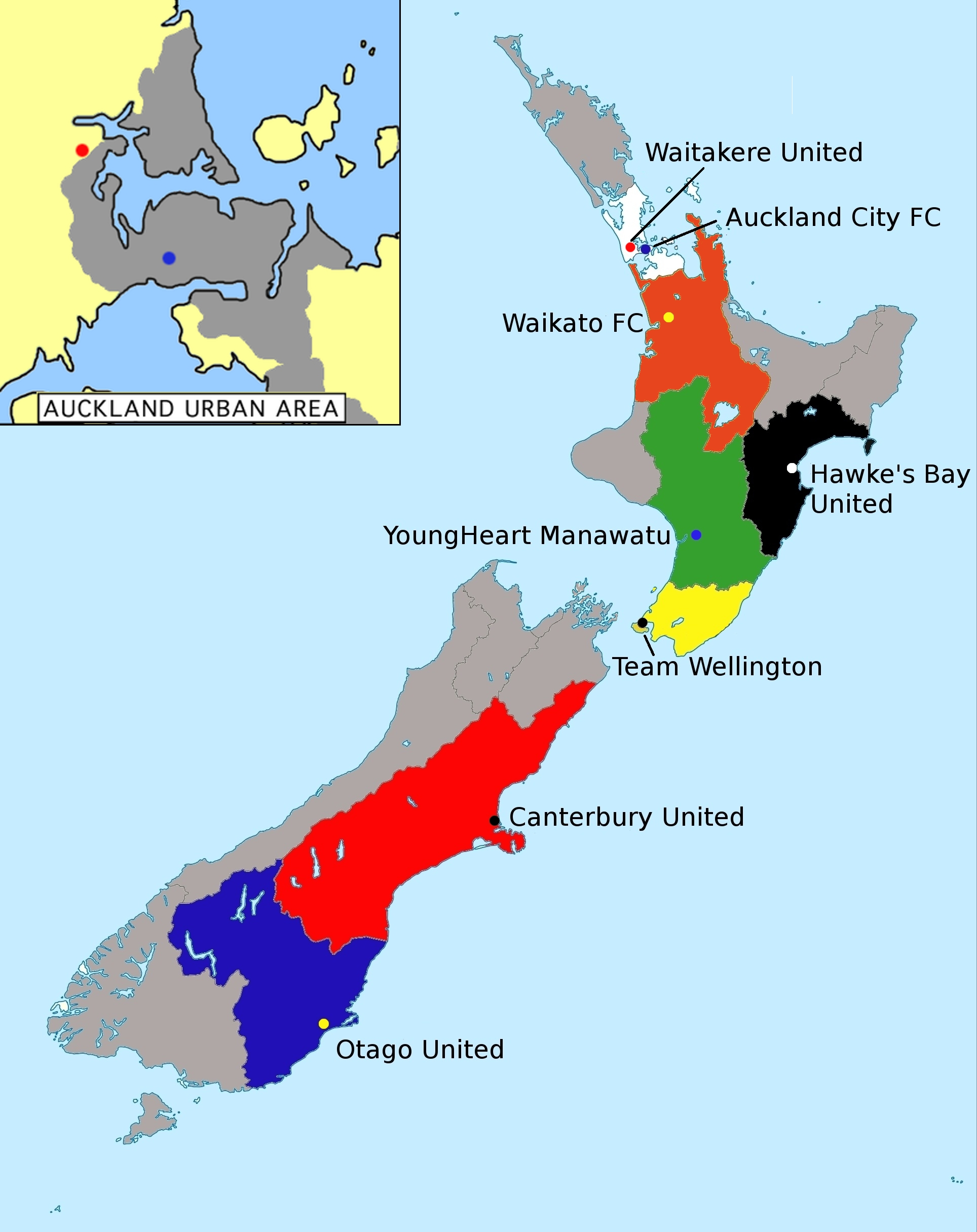
Location of clubs and the region they represent

Team	Location	Stadium	Capacity
Auckland City FC	Auckland	Kiwitea Street	3,500
Canterbury United	Christchurch	ASB Football Park	9,000
Hawke's Bay United	Napier	Bluewater Stadium	5,000
Otago United	Dunedin	Forsyth Barr Stadium	30,500
Team Wellington	Wellington	Newtown Park	5,000
Waikato FC	Hamilton	Porritt Stadium	2,700
Waitakere United	West Auckland	Fred Taylor Park	2,500
YoungHeart Manawatu	Palmerston North	Memorial Park	8,000

=== Personnel and kits ===
Team	Manager	Captain	Kit manufacturer	Shirt sponsor
Auckland City FC	(Spain) Ramon Tribulietx	(New Zealand) Ivan Vicelich	Nike	Trillian Trust Inc.
Canterbury United	(New Zealand) Keith Braithwaite	(England) Dan Terris	Samurai	Robbie's Bar and Bistro
Hawke's Bay United	(New Zealand) Chris Greatholder	(England) Bill Robertson	Umbro	Kinetic Electrical
Otago United	(New Zealand) Richard Murray	(New Zealand) Tristan Prattley	Canterbury	Gran's Remedy
Team Wellington	(New Zealand) Matt Calcott	(New Zealand) Karl Whalen	Lotto Sport Italia	Exodus Health & Fitness Club
Waikato FC	(New Zealand) Declan Edge	(New Zealand) Adam Thomas	Nike	The Soccer Shop
Waitakere United	(England) Neil Emblen	(New Zealand) Jake Butler	Lotto Sport Italia	Cuesports Foundation
YoungHeart Manawatu	(New Zealand) Stu Jacobs	(New Zealand) Nathan Cooksley	Umbro	New Zealand Pharmaceuticals

== League table ==
Pos	Team	Pld	W	D	L	GF	GA	GD	Pts	Qualification
1	Auckland City	14	11	3	0	43	11	+32	36	Qualified for the Finals and Champions League
2	Canterbury United	14	9	2	3	38	12	+26	29	Qualified for the Finals
3	Waitakere United (C)	14	9	0	5	44	17	+27	27	Qualified for the Finals and Champions League
4	Team Wellington	14	8	2	4	33	18	+15	26	Qualified for the Finals
5	Hawke's Bay United	14	6	1	7	28	35	−7	19	
6	Otago United	14	3	2	9	15	37	−22	11	
7	Waikato FC	14	2	3	9	17	39	−22	9	
8	YoungHeart Manawatu	14	0	3	11	12	61	−49	3	

(C) Champions

== Regular season ==
=== Round 1 ===
Saturday, 22 October 2011

2:00pm Saturday	Waitakere United	3–0	Hawke's Bay United	Fred Taylor Park, West Auckland
	Jake Butler 41'; Allan Pearce 80'; Roy Krishna 83'	Preview; Report		Attendance: 413; Referee: Peter O'Leary

Sunday, 23 October 2011

1:00pm Sunday	YoungHeart Manawatu	0–4	Canterbury United	Memorial Park, Palmerston North
		Preview; Report	Russell Kamo 3'; George Slefendorfas 5', 30'; Aaron Clapham 51' (pen.)	Referee: Nick Waldron

2:00pm Sunday	Waikato FC	1–5	Auckland City FC	Porritt Stadium, Hamilton
	Adam Thomas 38' (pen.)	Preview; Report	David Mulligan 23'; Manel Expósito 50', 63'; Emiliano Tade 54', 88'	Attendance: 200; Referee: Campbell Kirk-Waugh

2:30pm Sunday	Team Wellington	2–2	Otago United	David Farrington Park, Wellington
	Tristan Prattley 25' (o.g.); Karl Whalen 55'	Preview; Report	Ant Hancock 1'; Darren Overton 11'	Attendance: 272; Referee: Mirko Benischke

- Due to a breach of player eligibility regulations, the match between Team Wellington and Otago United on 23 October – originally a 2–2 draw –has been awarded as a 2–0 win to Team Wellington.

=== Round 2 ===
Sunday, 6 November 2011

2:00pm Sunday	Otago United	0–6	Waitakere United	Forsyth Barr Stadium, Dunedin
		Preview; Report	Ryan De Vries 31'; Roy Krishna 45'; Jude Fitzpatrick 45+4' (o.g.); Allan Pearce 65', 69'; Sean Lovemore 84'	Attendance: 950; Referee: Campbell Kirk-Waugh

2:00pm Sunday	Hawke's Bay United	2–2	YoungHeart Manawatu	Park Island, Napier
	Adam Cowan 47'; Hamish Watson 84'	Preview; Report	Bill Robertson 48' (o.g.); Jimmy Haidakis 66'	Attendance: 400; Referee: Mirko Benischke

2:00pm Sunday	Canterbury United	5–0	Waikato FC	ASB Football Park, Christchurch
	George Slefendorfas 3', 34', 34', 74'; Matt Thomas 68'	Preview; Report		Attendance: 500; Referee: John Rowbury

2:30pm Sunday	Auckland City FC	4–2	Team Wellington	Kiwitea Street, Auckland
	Tim Schaeffers 5' (o.g.); Emiliano Tade 43'; Luis Corrales 74'; Manel Expósito 79'	Preview; Report	Michael White 48'; Ethan Galbraith 57'	Attendance: 683; Referee: Matt Conger

=== Round 3 ===
Sunday, 13 November 2011

12:00pm Sunday	YoungHeart Manawatu	2–3	Otago United	Memorial Park, Palmerston North
	Nobuyoshi Ishi 3'; Jimmy Haidakis 20'	Preview; Report	Darren Overton 48'; Harley Rodeka 54', 83'	Attendance: 150; Referee: Jonathan Price

2:00pm Sunday	Waitakere United	1–3	Auckland City FC	Fred Taylor Park, West Auckland
	Ross McKenzie 42'	Preview; Report	Ross McKenzie 18' (o.g.); Timothy Myers 33' (o.g.); David Mulligan 57'	Attendance: 1034; Referee: Peter O'Leary

2:00pm Sunday	Team Wellington	3–0	Waikato FC	David Farrington Park, Wellington
	Tyson Holmes 19'; Ethan Galbraith 28'; Dakota Lucas 54'	Preview; Report		Attendance: 401; Referee: Nick Waldron

2:00pm Sunday	Hawke's Bay United	3–0	Canterbury United	Park Island, Napier
	Hamish Watson 45'; Bill Robertson 46'; Sam Margetts 62'	Preview; Report		Attendance: 403; Referee: Mark Hester

=== Round 4 ===
Sunday, 27 November 2011

12:00pm Sunday	Otago United	2–0	Hawke's Bay United	Tahuna Park, Dunedin
	Regan Coldicott 40'; Darren Overton 75'	Preview; Report		Attendance: 250; Referee: Matt Conger

2:00pm Sunday	Auckland City FC	5–0	YoungHeart Manawatu	Kiwitea Street, Auckland
	Daniel Koprivcic 7'; Luis Corrales 22'; David Mulligan 54' (pen.); Emiliano Tade 63'; Stephen Carmichael 82'	Preview; Report		Attendance: 987; Referee: Isaac Trevis

2:00pm Sunday	Waikato FC	1–4	Waitakere United	Porritt Stadium, Hamilton
	Harry Edge 89'	Preview; Report	Josh Greene 26' (o.g.); Roy Krishna 39'; Ryan De Vries 51'; Jake Butler 84'	Attendance: 230; Referee: Mirko Benischke

2:00pm Sunday	Canterbury United	1–0	Team Wellington	ASB Football Park, Christchurch
	Aaron Clapham 22' (pen.)	Preview; Report		Attendance: 300; Referee: Campbell- Kirk Waugh

=== Round 5 ===
Sunday, 11 December 2011

2:00pm Sunday	Team Wellington	1–2	Waitakere United	David Farrington Park, Wellington
	Patrick Fleming 33'	Preview; Report	Jake Butler 59'; Allan Pearce 74'	Attendance: 301; Referee: Chris Kerr

2:00pm Sunday	Otago United	1–0	Canterbury United	Forsyth Barr Stadium, Dunedin
	Mike Cunningham 2'	Preview; Report		Attendance: 500; Referee: Mirko Beneschke

2:00pm Sunday	YoungHeart Manawatu	1–3	Waikato FC	Memorial Park, Palmerston North
	Tomas Mosquera 63'	Preview; Report	Jason Hicks 26'; Adam Thomas 31'; Josh Greene 48'	Attendance: 100

Rescheduled (to Monday, 6 February 2012)

2:00pm Monday	Hawke's Bay United	v	Auckland City FC	Park Island, Napier
		Rescheduled due to the FIFA Club World Cup

=== Round 6 ===
Sunday, 18 December 2011

2:00pm Sunday	Auckland City FC	3–0	Otago United	Kiwitea Street, Auckland
	Emiliano Tade 69'; Andrew Milne 91'; Daniel Koprivcic 3'			Attendance: 547; Referee: John Rowbury

2:00pm Sunday	Team Wellington	2–0	YoungHeart Manawatu	David Farrington Park, Wellington
	Darren Cheriton 35'; Dakota Lucas 41'			Attendance: 241; Referee: Jonathon Price

2:00pm Sunday	Canterbury United	2–1	Waitakere United	ASB Football Park, Christchurch
	Cole Peverley 26' (pen.); Calvin Opperman 84'		Gagame Feni 90+3'	Attendance: 800; Referee: Mark Hester

Rescheduled (to Saturday, 11 February 2012)

2:00pm Sunday	Waikato FC	v	Hawke's Bay United	Porritt Stadium, Hamilton
		Rescheduled due to a waterlogged pitch

=== Round 7 ===
Saturday, 14 January 2012

2:00pm Saturday	Auckland City FC	3–0	Canterbury United	Kiwitea Street, Auckland
	Daniel Koprivcic 17'; Manel Expósito 60'; Emiliano Tade 88'			Attendance: 643; Referee: Peter O'Leary

Sunday, 15 January 2012

12:00pm Sunday	Otago United	0–2	Waikato FC	Forsyth Barr Stadium, Dunedin
			Mohammed Awad 82'; Jason Hicks 85'	Attendance: 250; Referee: Jamie Cross

1:00pm Sunday	Hawke's Bay United	2–6	Team Wellington	Park Island, Napier
	Sam Margetts 12', 38'		Louis Fenton 5', 19', 59', 89'; Dakota Lucas 55'; Ethan Galbraith 90+1'	Attendance: 387; Referee: Isaac Trevis

2:00pm Sunday	YoungHeart Manawatu	2–7	Waitakere United	Memorial Park, Palmerston North
	Seule Soromon 30'; Jimmy Haidakis 73'		Allan Pearce 1', 62' (pen.); Roy Krishna 26'; Sean Lovemore 38', 47', 67'; Jake Butler 71'	Attendance: 120; Referee: Matt Conger

=== Round 8 ===
Sunday, 22 January 2012

2:00pm Sunday	Auckland City FC	0–0	Waikato FC	Kiwitea Street, Auckland
		Preview; Report		Attendance: 876; Referee: Matt Conger

2:00pm Sunday	Otago United	1–2	Team Wellington	Caledonian, Dunedin
	Harley Rodeka 41'	Preview; Report	Karl Whalen 39'; Michael Eagar 47' (pen.)	Attendance: 210; Referee: Mirko Benischke

2:00pm Sunday	Hawke's Bay United	1–0	Waitakere United	Bluewater Stadium, Napier
	Conor Tinnion 78'	Preview; Report		Attendance: 322; Referee: C-K Waugh

2:00pm Sunday	Canterbury United	9–1	YoungHeart Manawatu	ASB Football Park, Christchurch
	Darren White 17'; Aaron Clapham 23', 64'; Joe Murray 34'; Tom Schwarz 53'; Matt Borren 55' (o.g.); Julyan Collett 79'; Russell Kamo 73', 83'	Preview; Report	Jimmy Haidakis 37'	Attendance: 450; Referee: Nick Waldron

- After carefully examining the match footage of the Canterbury United vs YoungHeart Manawatu game, two goals have been reassigned and awarded to different players: 1) the 34th-minute goal credited to Darren White has now been awarded to Joe Murray; and 2) the 56th-minute goal credited to Russel Kamo has now been awarded as an own goal scored by Matt Borren.

=== Round 9 ===
Sunday, 29 January 2012

12:30pm Sunday	Waikato FC	0–3	Canterbury United	Porritt Stadium, Hamilton
		Preview; Report	Russell Kamo 7', 23'; Aaron Clapham 79'	Attendance: 200; Referee: Campbell Waugh

1pm Sunday	Team Wellington	1–1	Auckland City FC	Newtown Park, Wellington
	Patrick Fleming 18'	Preview; Report	Manel Expósito 19'	Attendance: 351; Referee: Mark Hester

2pm Sunday	Waitakere United	5–0	Otago United	Fred Taylor Park, West Auckland
	Roy Krishna 9', 34', 74'; Liam Lockhart 12' (o.g.); Ryan De Vries 80'	Preview; Report		Attendance: 402; Referee: Isaac Trevis

2pm Sunday	YoungHeart Manawatu	0–5	Hawke's Bay United	Memorial Park, Palmerston North
		Preview; Report	Sam Margetts 5'; Tom Biss 17' (pen.), 72', 81' (pen.); Hamish Watson 90+1'	Attendance: 150; Referee: Chris Kerr

=== Round 10 ===
Saturday, 4 February 2012

2pm Saturday	Auckland City FC	3–1	Waitakere United	Kiwitea Street, Auckland
	Luis Corrales 29'; Daniel Koprivcic 69'; Manel Expósito 81'	Preview; Report	Chris Bale 56'	Attendance: 2003; Referee: Mirko Benischke

3pm Saturday	Canterbury United	7–0	Hawke's Bay United	ASB Football Park, Christchurch
	George Slefendorfas 18', 28', 34', 45', 60'; Darren White 36'; Aaron Clapham 46' (pen.)	Preview; Report		Attendance: 500; Referee: Jamie Cross

Sunday, 5 February 2012

12pm Sunday	Otago United	2–2	YoungHeart Manawatu	Forsyth Barr Stadium, Dunedin
	Harley Rodeka 14'; Aajay Cunningham 55'	Preview; Report	Suele Soromon 18'; Jimmy Haidakis 34'	Attendance: 501; Referee: John Rowbury

1pm Sunday	Waikato FC	2–3	Team Wellington	Porritt Stadium, Hamilton
	Adam Thomas 9' (pen.); Tyler Boyd 18'	Preview; Report	Ricky Zucco 11'; James Musa 34'; Louis Fenton 90+2'	Attendance: 170; Referee: Matt Stoneman

=== Round 5 Catch Up ===
Monday, 6 February 2012

2pm Monday	Hawke's Bay United	1–3	Auckland City FC	Bluewater Stadium, Napier
	Conor Tinnion 15'	Preview; Report	Emiliano Tade 45+1' (pen.), 87' (pen.); Manel Expósito 47'	Attendance: 400; Referee: Nick Waldron

=== Round 11 ===
Sunday, 12 February 2012

1pm Sunday	Hawke's Bay United	4–2	Otago United	Bluewater Stadium, Napier
	Jude Fitzpatrick 63' (o.g.); Hamish Watson 64'; Leon Birnie 75'; Stu Wilson 79'	Preview; Report	Ant Hancock 16', 45'	Attendance: 360; Referee: Chris Kerr

1pm Sunday	Team Wellington	1–1	Canterbury United	Newtown Park, Wellington
	Louis Fenton 84'	Preview; Report	Aaron Clapham 30' (pen.)	Attendance: 364; Referee: Peter O'Leary

2pm Sunday	Waitakere United	4–0	Waikato FC	Fred Taylor Park, West Auckland
	Ryan de Vries 5'; Chris Bale 29'; Allan Pearce 55'; Jake Butler 75'	Preview; Report		Attendance: 388; Referee: Nick Waldron

2pm Sunday	YoungHeart Manawatu	0–6	Auckland City FC	Memorial Park, Palmerston North
		Preview; Report	Andrew Milne 12'; Alex Feneridis 34'; Chad Coombes 37', 38', 45'; Adam Dickinson 41'	Attendance: 115; Referee: Jamie Cross

=== Round 6 Catch Up ===
Saturday, 11 February 2012

2pm Saturday	Waikato FC	2–4	Hawke's Bay United	Porritt Stadium, Hamilton
	Ryan Thomas 50'; Mohamed Awad 88'	Report	Adam Cowan 25'; Sam Margetts 44'; Bill Robertson 75'; Hamish Watson 89'	Attendance: 150; Referee: Campbell Waugh

=== Round 12 ===
Sunday, 26 February 2012

2pm Sunday	Auckland City FC	3–2	Hawke's Bay United	Kiwitea Street, Auckland
	Chad Coombes 52'; David Mulligan 70'; Luis Corrales 80'	Preview; Report	Conor Tinnion 1'; Tom Biss 88' (pen.)	Attendance: 833; Referee: Nick Waldron

2pm Sunday	Waikato FC	1–1	YoungHeart Manawatu	Porritt Stadium, Hamilton
	Tyler Boyd 42'	Preview; Report	Nathan Cooksley 34'	Referee: Mirko Benische

2pm Sunday	Canterbury United	3–0	Otago United	ASB Football Park, Christchurch
	Russell Kamo 42', 85'; Aaron Clapham 54'	Preview; Report		Attendance: 550; Referee: Peter O' Leary

4pm Sunday	Waitakere United	3–1	Team Wellington	Fred Taylor Park, West Auckland
	Chris Bale 23', 49'; Ryan De Vries 24'	Preview; Report	Louis Fenton 19'	Attendance: 300; Referee: Matt Conger

=== Round 13 ===
Sunday, 11 March 2012

2pm Sunday	Waitakere United	1–2	Canterbury United	Fred Taylor Park, West Auckland
	Ryan de Vries 4'	Preview; Report	Aaron Clapham 8'; George Slefendorfas 76'	Attendance: 567; Referee: Nick Waldron

2pm Sunday	Otago United	1–3	Auckland City FC	Forsyth Barr Stadium, Dunedin
	James Govan 67'	Preview; Report	Luis Corrales 34'; Manel Expósito 37'; Angel Berlanga 48'	Attendance: 250; Referee: Matt Stoneman

2pm Sunday	Hawke's Bay United	3–2	Waikato FC	Bluewater Stadium, Napier
	Danny Wilson 21'; Sam Margetts 77'; Dale Higham 90+1'	Preview; Report	Mohammed Awad 23'; Tyler Boyd 44'	Attendance: 420; Referee: Matt Conger

2pm Sunday	YoungHeart Manawatu	0–6	Team Wellington	Memorial Park, Palmerston North, Palmerston North
		Preview; Report	Henry Fa'Arodo 11'; Luke Rowe 27'; Dakota Lucas 51'; Patrick Fleming 61'; Louis Fenton 66'; Dominic Rowe 85'	Attendance: 150; Referee: Chris Kerr

=== Round 14 ===
Sunday, 25 March 2012

1pm Sunday	Waikato FC	3–3	Otago United	Porritt Stadium, Hamilton
	Ryan Thomas 68', 80'; Tyler Boyd 78'	Preview; Report	Ant Hancock 16', 62'; Harley Rodeka 71'	Referee: Peter O'Leary

Friday, 6 April 2012

2pm Friday	Waitakere United	6–1	YoungHeart Manawatu	Fred Taylor Park, Waitakere
	Rory Turner 1', 45+1'; Ryan de Vries 28'; Allan Pearce 33', 44'; Sean Lovemore 78'	Preview; Report	Nathan Cooksley 7'	Attendance: 348; Referee: John Rowbury

Sunday, 8 April 2012

1pm Sunday	Team Wellington	3–1	Hawke's Bay United	Newton Park, Wellington
	Luke Rowe 21'; Henry Fa'arodo 56', 75'	Preview; Report	Hamish Watson 18'	Attendance: 253; Referee: Peter O'Leary

2pm Sunday	Canterbury United	1–1	Auckland City FC	ASB Football Park, Christchurch
	Russell Kamo 12'	Preview; Report	Angel Berlanga 42'	Attendance: 550; Referee: Matt Conger

== Finals ==
Semifinals
Auckland City FC	0	1	1
Team Wellington	1	3	4
Canterbury United	1	2	3
Waitakere United	0	5	5

Finals
Team Wellington	1
Waitakere United	4

=== Semi-finals – first leg ===
15 April 2012	Team Wellington	1–0	Auckland City FC	Newtown Park, Wellington
Sunday 12pm	Johnny Raj 33'	Preview; Report		Attendance: 427; Referee: Mirko Benischke

15 April 2012	Waitakere United	0–1	Canterbury United	Fred Taylor Park, West Auckland
Sunday 2pm		Preview; Report	Russell Kamo 8'	Attendance: 347; Referee: Matt Conger

=== Semi-finals – second leg ===
22 April 2012	Auckland City FC	1–3	Team Wellington	Kiwitea Street, Auckland
Sunday 2pm	Manel Expósito 71'	Preview; Report	Henry Fa'arodo 25'; Dakota Lucas 82', 90'	Attendance: 1279; Referee: Chris Kerr

22 April 2012	Canterbury United	2–5	Waitakere United	ASB Football Park, Christchurch
Sunday 2pm	Aaron Clapham 13'; George Slefendorfas 30'	Preview; Report	Ryan De Vries 12', 87'; Jake Butler 48'; Roy Krishna 49', 63'	Attendance: 1400; Referee: Mirko Benischke

=== Final ===
28 April 2012
Saturday 7:35pm

Waitakere United	4–1	Team Wellington
Roy Krishna 45+1', 89'; Allan Pearce 77'; Jake Butler 84'	Preview; Report	Henry Fa'arodo 85'

Trusts Stadium, West Auckland
Attendance: 2500
Referee: Nick Waldron

== Positions by round ==
Team ╲ Round	1	2	3	4	5	6	7	8	9	10*	11	12	13	14
Auckland City	1	3	1	1	1	1	1	1	1	1	1	1	1	1
Canterbury United	2	1	3	3	4	3	4	3	3	2	2	2	2	2
Hawke's Bay United	6	5	5	6	6	6	7	6	5	5	5	5	5	5
Otago United	4	7	6	4	3	5	5	5	6	6	6	6	6	6
Team Wellington	4	4	4	5	5	4	3	4	4	3	4	4	4	4
Waikato FC	7	8	8	8	7	7	6	7	7	7	7	7	7	7
Waitakere United	3	1	2	2	2	2	2	2	2	4	3	3	3	3
YoungHeart Manawatu	8	6	7	7	8	8	8	8	8	8	8	8	8	8

^{*} Round 10 positions include the Round 5 catch-up game between Hawkes Bay United and Auckland City

== Season statistics ==
=== Leading goalscorers ===
Updated to Round 14

Total	Player		Team	Goals per Round													
Total	Player		Team	1	2	3	4	5	6	7	8	9	10*	11*	12	13	14
12	(Papua New Guinea)	George Slefendorfas	Canterbury United	2	4								5			1	
9	(New Zealand)	Aaron Clapham	Canterbury United	1			1				2	1	1	1	1	1	
9	(New Zealand)	Allan Pearce	Waitakere United	1	2			1		2				1			2
8	(Argentina)	Emiliano Tade	Auckland City FC	2	1		1		1	1			2				
8	(Spain)	Manel Expósito	Auckland City FC	2	1					1		1	2			1	
8	(New Zealand)	Louis Fenton	Team Wellington							4			1	1	1	1	
8	(New Zealand)	Russell Kamo	Canterbury United	1							2	2			2		1
7	(Fiji)	Roy Krishna	Waitakere United	1	1		1			1		3					
7	(South Africa)	Ryan De Vries	Waitakere United		1		1					1		1	1	1	1
6	(New Zealand)	Sam Margetts	Hawke's Bay United			1				2		1		1		1	
6	(New Zealand)	Hamish Watson	Hawke's Bay United		1	1						1		2			1

A goal was scored from a penalty kick Two goals were scored from penalty kicks

- Goals scored during Round 5 catch up were included in Round 10, and goals scored during Round 6 catch up were included in Round 11

=== Own goals ===
Updated to end of Round 11

Total	Player		Team	Week(s)
2	(New Zealand)	Jude Fitzpatrick	Otago United (v Waitakere United); Otago United (v Hawke's Bay United)	2,11
1	(New Zealand)	Tristan Prattley	Otago United (v Team Wellington)	1
1	(England)	Bill Robertson	Hawke's Bay United (v YoungHeart Manawatu)	2
1	(New Zealand)	Tim Schaeffers	Team Wellington (v Auckland City FC)	2
1	(New Zealand)	Ross McKenzie	Waitakere United (v Auckland City FC)	3
1	(New Zealand)	Timothy Myers	Waitakere United (v Auckland City FC)	3
1	(New Zealand)	Josh Greene	Waikato FC (v Waitakere United)	4
1	(New Zealand)	Matt Borren	YoungHeart Manawatu (v Canterbury United)	8
1	(New Zealand)	Liam Lockhart	Otago United (v Waitakere United)	9

== ASB Premiership Monthly Awards ==
Month	Most Outstanding Player		Coach of the Month	
Month	Player	Club	Player	Club
November 2011	(Papua New Guinea) George Slefendorfas	Canterbury United	(Spain) Ramon Tribulietx	Auckland City FC
December 2011	(New Zealand) Adam Highfield	Canterbury United	(New Zealand) Declan Edge	Waikato FC
January 2012	(New Zealand) Aaron Clapham	Canterbury United	(New Zealand) Matt Calcott	Team Wellington
February 2012	(Wales) Chris Bale	Waitakere United	(Spain) Ramon Tribulietx	Auckland City FC
March/April 2012	(New Zealand) Luke Rowe	Team Wellington	(New Zealand) Keith Braithwaite	Canterbury United
