= Alexis Cárcamo =

Chilean footballer

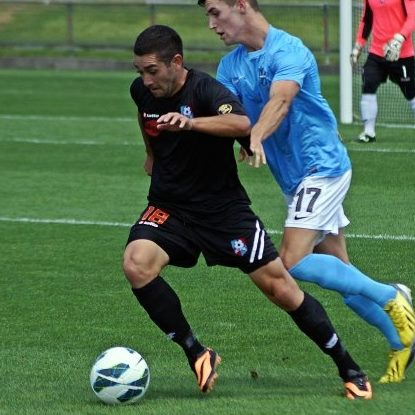

Personal information
- Full name: Alexis Patricio Cárcamo Varela
- Date of birth: 3 September 1984 (age 42)
- Place of birth: Rancagua, Chile
- Position: Attacking midfielder

Youth career
- Escuela Bernardo O'Higgins

Senior career*
Years	Team	Apps	(Gls)
- Magallanes
- Barnechea
- Deportes Santa Cruz
2007	Los Desordenados		
2010	Deportes Paniahue		
2011–2012	Onehunga Sports		
2012–2013	Waikato FC		
2013–2016	WaiBOP United		
2015–2018	Hamilton Wanderers		
2018–2019	Glenfield Rovers		
2019–2020	Tasman United		
2020–2021	Manurewa AFC		
- * Club domestic league appearances and goals

Alexis Patricio Cárcamo Varela (born 3 September 1984) is a Chilean former footballer who played as an attacking midfielder. Besides Chile, he played in New Zealand.

== Career ==
As a child, Cárcamo was with Escuela de Fútbol Bernardo O'Higgins in his city of birth. At professional level, Cárcamo played for Magallanes, Barnechea and Deportes Santa Cruz in his homeland. In addition, he played for club Los Desordenados from Rancagua and Deportes Paniahue. As a member of Deportes Paniahue, he took part in the 2010 Copa Chile Bicentenario.

In 2011, he moved to New Zealand thanks to a friend from O'Higgins and joined Onehunga Sports. In 2012, he signed with Waikato FC, later WaiBOP United, in the New Zealand top level. He also played for Hamilton Wanderers, where he coincided with his compatriot Ignacio Machuca and became the team captain, Glenfield Rovers, Tasman United and Manurewa AFC.

== Personal life ==
At the same time he was a player, he started a football academy in New Zealand.
