= Keith Braithwaite =

New Zealand footballer

Personal information
- Full name: Keith Braithwaite
- Place of birth: England
- Position: Midfielder

Senior career*
Years	Team	Apps	(Gls)
- Christchurch United

International career
1988	New Zealand	1	(0)

Managerial career
- 2009 –: Canterbury United
- * Club domestic league appearances and goals

Keith Braithwaite is a former association football player who represented New Zealand at international level.

Braithwaite played for Christchurch United Football Club from 1982 to 1992. During his time with the club, Braithwaite became their all time longest serving captain, as well as the club's top goal scorer. In 1987, he set a National League record of scoring six goals in a single game against Manawatu.

Braithwaite made a solitary official international appearance for New Zealand in a 3–2 win over Saudi Arabia on 23 June 1988.

== Honours ==
Individual

- Mainland Football Male Team Coach of the Year: 2009
- Mainland Football Women's Team Coach of the Year: 2016
