= 2018–19 New Zealand Football Championship =

ISPS Handa Premiership
- Season: 2018–19
- Champions: Eastern Suburbs
- Premiers: Auckland City
- OFC Champions League: Auckland City; Eastern Suburbs
- Matches: 89
- Goals: 343 (3.85 per match)
- Top goalscorer: Callum McCowatt (18 goals)
- All statistics correct as of 31 March 2018.

The 2018–19 New Zealand Football Championship season (currently known as the ISPS Handa Premiership for sponsorship reasons) was the fifteenth season of the NZFC since its establishment in 2004. Ten teams competed in the competition with Auckland City and Team Wellington representing the ISPS Handa Premiership in the 2019 OFC Champions League after finishing Champions and Premiers (Auckland City) and runner-up (Team Wellington) respectively in the 2017–18 competition.

== Clubs ==
Team	Location	Stadium	Capacity	Manager	Kit manufacturer	Shirt sponsor
Auckland City	Auckland	Kiwitea Street	3,250	(Spain) Ramon Tribulietx	Kappa	Trillian Trust Inc (Front) Carters (Back)
Canterbury United	Christchurch	English Park	9,000	(New Zealand) Willy Gerdsen	Nike	Robbie's Bar and Bistro
Eastern Suburbs	Auckland	Riverhills Park	5,000	(New Zealand) Danny Hay	Lilywhites	Winger Motors
Hamilton Wanderers	Hamilton	Porritt Stadium	5,000	(New Zealand) Ricki Herbert	Kelme	The Soccer Shop
Hawke's Bay United	Napier	Bluewater Stadium	5,000	(England) Brett Angell	Adidas	Thirsty Whale
Southern United	Dunedin	Sunnyvale Park	1,000	(Republic of Ireland) Paul O'Reilly	Lotto Sport Italia	Freshwater Solutions
Tasman United	Nelson	Trafalgar Park	18,000	(England) Andy Hedge	Nike	Nelson Pine LVL (Front) Sprig & Fern (Back)
Team Wellington	Wellington	David Farrington Park	2,250	(England) José Figueira	Nike	Stonewood Homes
Waitakere United	Auckland	The Trusts Arena	4,900	(New Zealand) Chris Milicich	Lotto Sport Italia	Mitre 10 Mega - Henderson (Front) Heritage Hotels (Back)
Wellington Phoenix	Wellington	Porirua Park	1,900	(England) Paul Temple	Adidas	Huawei

== Regular season ==
=== League table ===
Pos	Team	Pld	W	D	L	GF	GA	GD	Pts	Qualification
1	Auckland City	18	17	1	0	46	18	+28	52	Qualification to OFC Champions League group stage and Finals series
2	Eastern Suburbs (C)	18	13	1	4	53	16	+37	40	Qualification to OFC Champions League group stage and Finals series
3	Canterbury United	18	10	4	4	34	29	+5	34 (Note: Head-to-head results: Team Wellington 1–1 Canterbury United, Canterbury United 2–1 Team Wellington.)	Qualification to Finals series
4	Team Wellington	18	10	4	4	43	25	+18	34	Qualification to Finals series
5	Southern United	18	6	5	7	24	30	−6	23	
6	Hamilton Wanderers	18	5	2	11	34	44	−10	17 (Note: Head-to-head results: Hawke's Bay United 0–2 Hamilton Wanderers, Hamilton Wanderers 4–4 Hawke's Bay United.)	
7	Hawke's Bay United	18	4	5	9	38	55	−17	17	
8	Tasman United	18	3	5	10	22	36	−14	14	
9	Waitakere United	18	4	1	13	29	46	−17	13	
10	Wellington Phoenix Reserves	18	3	2	13	22	46	−24	11	

Source: NZ Football
(C) Champions

=== Positions by round ===
Team ╲ Round	1	2	3	4	5	6	7	8	9	10	11	12	13	14	15	16	17	18	19	20	21
Auckland City	1	1	3	3	2	1	1	1	1	1	1	1	1	1	1	1	1	1	1	1	1
Canterbury United	2	5	5	5	5	6	5	6	5	5	4	3	4	3	3	4	4	4	4	3	3
Eastern Suburbs	2	2	1	1	3	3	3	3	3	2	2	2	2	2	2	2	2	2	2	2	2
Hamilton Wanderers	2	3	4	4	4	4	4	4	4	4	5	5	5	5	5	6	6	6	6	6	6
Hawke's Bay United	2	10	6	8	8	9	8	7	6	6	6	6	6	6	7	7	7	7	7	7	7
Southern United	2	6	7	6	7	7	6	5	7	7	7	7	7	7	6	5	5	5	5	5	5
Tasman United	2	7	8	9	9	8	9	9	9	9	9	9	9	8	8	8	9	9	9	9	8
Team Wellington	10	4	2	2	1	2	2	2	2	3	3	4	3	4	4	3	3	3	3	4	4
Waitakere United	2	8	9	7	6	5	7	8	8	8	8	8	8	9	9	9	8	8	8	8	9
Wellington Phoenix	2	9	9	10	10	10	10	10	10	10	10	10	10	10	10	10	10	10	10	10	10

Leader and qualification to OFC Champions League Group stage
Qualification to Finals series

Updated to match(es) played on Completed. Source: NZ Football

Notes:

- The match between Southern United and Auckland City in Round 3 was abandoned at 0–0 after 47 minutes due to the pitch becoming unplayable, it will be rescheduled for 14 February 2019.
- Waitakere United were tied with Wellington Phoenix Reserves at the end of Round 3 in last place.
- The match between Canterbury United and Tasman United was cancelled due to the Christchurch mosque shootings and awarded as a 0–0 draw.

=== Fixtures and results ===
The 2018–19 season took place in a round-robin format, with each side playing every other side at both home and away.

==== Round 1 ====
14 October 2018 Charity Cup	Auckland City	4–3	Team Wellington	Auckland
Sunday, 16:35 NZDT	Howieson 19'; Lopez 30'; Morgan 52'; Lea'alafa 73'	Report	Barcia 16'; Watson 17', 85'	Stadium: Kiwitea Street; Referee: Cory Mills

==== Round 2 ====
20 October 2018	Eastern Suburbs	5–0	Hawke's Bay United	Auckland
Saturday, 16:00 NZDT	De Jong 7'; Sinclair 27', 74'; Awad 61'; Pijnaker 83'	Report		Stadium: Madills Farm; Referee: Anna-Marie Keighley

21 October 2018	Canterbury United	1–0	Southern United	Christchurch
Sunday, 13:00 NZDT	Liddicoat 36'	Report		Stadium: English Park; Referee: Campbell-Kirk Waugh

21 October 2018	Hamilton Wanderers	3–1	Waitakere United	Hamilton
Sunday, 14:00 NZDT	Semmy 15', 39'; Bueno 22'	Report	Issa 61'	Stadium: Porritt Stadium; Referee: Cory Mills

21 October 2018	Auckland City	3–1	Tasman United	Auckland
Sunday, 14:00 NZDT	Lopez 30', 67'; Browne 52'	Report	Vale 69' (o.g.)	Stadium: Kiwitea Street; Referee: Calvin Berg

21 October 2018	Wellington Phoenix Reserves	1–4	Team Wellington	Wellington
Sunday, 14:10 NZDT	Harris 20'	Report	Barcia 28'; Bevin 39'; Watson 56' (pen.); Cameron 79'	Stadium: Westpac Stadium; Referee: Ben O'Connell

==== Round 3 ====
27 October 2018	Eastern Suburbs	2–0	Wellington Phoenix Reserves	Auckland
Saturday, 15:00 NZDT	Wooldridge 6'; De Jong 25'	Report		Stadium: Riverhills Park; Referee: Allan Wilson

28 October 2018	Hawke's Bay United	2–2	Canterbury United	Napier
Sunday, 13:00 NZDT	Oliveri 45+3'; Ifill 90+4'	Report	Ogilvie 56'; Hoyle 60'	Stadium: Bluewater Stadium; Referee: Nick Waldron

14 February 2019	Southern United	1–1	Auckland City	Dunedin
Thursday, 16:00 NZDT	Last 10'	Report	López 69' (pen.)	Stadium: Caledonian Ground; Referee: Cory Mills

28 October 2018	Tasman United	1–2	Hamilton Wanderers	Nelson
Sunday, 14:00 NZDT	Othman 87'	Report	Ayers 43' (o.g.); Terry 69'	Stadium: Trafalgar Park; Referee: Ben O'Connell

28 October 2018	Waitakere United	0–3	Team Wellington	Auckland
Sunday, 16:35 NZDT		Report	Watson 4' (pen.); Ilich 79'; Allen 81'	Stadium: The Trusts Arena; Referee: Antony Riley

==== Round 4 ====
3 November 2018	Wellington Phoenix Reserves	1–5	Waitakere United	Wellington
Saturday, 16:45 NZDT	Harris 55'	Report	Bassett 3'; Connor-McLean 31'; Frachini 44'; Butler 70'; Abba 80'	Stadium: Westpac Stadium; Referee: Calvin Berg

4 November 2018	Hamilton Wanderers	0–1	Southern United	Hamilton
Sunday, 14:00 NZDT		Report	Wade 68'	Stadium: Porritt Stadium; Referee: Anna-Marie Keighley

4 November 2018	Auckland City	2–1	Hawke's Bay United	Auckland
Sunday, 14:00 NZDT	Manickum 67'; Lea'alafa 71'	Report	Mason-Smith 90+1'	Stadium: Kiwitea Street; Referee: Campbell-Kirk Waugh

4 November 2018	Canterbury United	1–3	Eastern Suburbs	Christchurch
Sunday, 14:00 NZDT	Clark 74'	Report	Just 2'; Liddicoat 5' (o.g.); de Jong 33'	Stadium: English Park; Referee: Antony Riley

4 November 2018	Team Wellington	2–0	Tasman United	Wellington
Sunday, 14:00 NZDT	Watson 34'; Sinclair 38'	Report		Stadium: David Farrington Park; Referee: Matthew Conger

==== Round 5 ====
11 November 2018	Hawke's Bay United	0–2	Hamilton Wanderers	Napier
Sunday, 14:00 NZDT		Report	Shaw 54'; Semmy 73'	Stadium: Bluewater Stadium; Referee: Ben O'Connell

11 November 2018	Team Wellington	3–1	Southern United	Wellington
Sunday, 14:00 NZDT	Ilich 29'; Sinclair 60'; Hailemariam 72'	Report	Al-Kalisy 38'	Stadium: David Farrington Park; Referee: Campbell-Kirk Waugh

11 November 2018	Waitakere United	3–0	Tasman United	Auckland
Sunday, 14:00 NZDT	Franchini 70' (pen.); Abba 75', 80'	Report		Stadium: The Trusts Arena; Referee: Peter Linney

11 November 2018	Wellington Phoenix Reserves	2–3	Canterbury United	Wellington
Sunday, 15:00 NZDT	Ebbinge 24', 27'	Report	Hoyle 45+1'; Schwarz 61'; Thurston 85'	Stadium: Newtown Park; Referee: Anna-Marie Keighley

11 November 2018	Eastern Suburbs	0–1	Auckland City	Auckland
Sunday, 16:35 NZDT		Report	Manickum 54'	Stadium: Riverhills Park; Referee: Nick Waldron

==== Round 6 ====
18 November 2018	Hamilton Wanderers	0–2	Eastern Suburbs	Cambridge
Sunday, 14:00 NZDT		Report	Awad 21'; McCowatt 48'	Stadium: John Kerkhof Park; Referee: Campbell-Kirk Waugh

18 November 2018	Auckland City	4–1	Canterbury United	Auckland
Sunday, 14:00 NZDT	Morgan 44'; Lopez 45+3' (pen.); Drake 74'; Manickum 83'	Report	Hoyle 10'	Stadium: Kiwitea Street; Referee: Peter Linney

18 November 2018	Tasman United	3–2	Wellington Phoenix Reserves	Nelson
Sunday, 14:00 NZDT	Hughes-Mason 53'; Othman 70'; Larsen 72'	Report	Waine 8', 77'	Stadium: Trafalgar Park; Referee: Antony Riley

18 November 2018	Team Wellington	2–2	Hawke's Bay United	Wellington
Sunday, 14:00 NZDT	Watson 32'; Hailemariam 52'	Report	Akers 48', 80'	Stadium: David Farrington Park; Referee: Allan Wilson

18 November 2018	Waitakere United	1–1	Southern United	Auckland
Sunday, 16:35 NZDT	Butler 60'	Report	Al-Kalisy 48'	Stadium: The Trusts Arena; Referee: Ben O'Connell

==== Round 7 ====
25 November 2018	Southern United	3–1	Tasman United	Dunedin
Sunday, 13:00 NZDT	Coughlan 10', 45' (pen.); Last 58'	Report	Hughes-Mason 38'	Stadium: Sunnyvale Park; Referee: Peter Linney

25 November 2018	Hawke's Bay United	4–0	Waitakere United	Napier
Sunday, 14:00 NZDT	Zupo 22'; Mason-Smith 54', 59'; Eriksson 83'	Report		Stadium: Bluewater Stadium; Referee: Cory Mills

25 November 2018	Canterbury United	3–3	Hamilton Wanderers	Christchurch
Sunday, 14:00 NZDT	Hoyle 5', 54'; Schwarz 16'	Report	Ruka 65'; Bueno 67', 77'	Stadium: English Park; Referee: Calvin Berg

25 November 2018	Wellington Phoenix Reserves	0–3	Auckland City	Wellington
Sunday, 15:00 NZDT		Report	Vale 22'; Morgan 46'; Drake 59'	Stadium: David Farrington Park; Referee: Allan Wilson

25 November 2018	Eastern Suburbs	1–2	Team Wellington	Auckland
Sunday, 16:35 NZDT	de Jong 19'	Report	Watson 12', 24' (pen.)	Stadium: Riverhills Park; Referee: Anna-Marie Keighley

==== Round 8 ====
1 December 2018	Team Wellington	1–1	Canterbury United	Wellington
Saturday, 14:00 NZDT	Liddicoat 45' (o.g.)	Report	Kowal 75'	Stadium: David Farrington Park; Referee: Nick Waldron

1 December 2018	Waitakere United	0–2	Eastern Suburbs	Auckland
Saturday, 14:00 NZDT		Report	de Jong 59' (pen.), 86'	Stadium: McLennan Park; Referee: Campbell-Kirk Waugh

2 December 2018	Tasman United	2–4	Hawke's Bay United	Nelson
Sunday, 14:00 NZDT	Winterton 66'; Hughes-Mason 70'	Report	Oliveri 8'; Mason-Smith 9'; Akers 30'; Goto 34'	Stadium: Trafalgar Park; Referee: Anna-Marie Keighley

2 December 2018	Wellington Phoenix Reserves	1–2	Southern United	Wellington
Sunday, 15:00 NZDT	Curry 52'	Report	Curry 37' (o.g.); Coughlan 90+2'	Stadium: Newtown Park; Referee: Antony Riley

2 December 2018	Hamilton Wanderers	0–1	Auckland City	Hamilton
Sunday, 16:35 NZDT		Report	Bonsu-Maro 87'	Stadium: Porritt Stadium; Referee: Peter Linney

==== Round 9 ====
9 December 2018	Hawke's Bay United	3–2	Southern United	Napier
Sunday, 13:00 NZDT	Goto 28'; Mason-Smith 36'; Oliveri 64'	Report	Wade 10'; Coughlan 42'	Stadium: Bluewater Stadium; Referee: Nick Waldron

9 December 2018	Hamilton Wanderers	3–1	Wellington Phoenix Reserves	Hamilton
Sunday, 14:00 NZDT	Semmy 15', 67'; Bueno 77'	Report	Nichols 38'	Stadium: Porritt Stadium; Referee: Calvin Berg

9 December 2018	Canterbury United	2–1	Waitakere United	Christchurch
Sunday, 14:00 NZDT	Ogilvie 44'; Chang 84'	Report	Issa 23'	Stadium: English Park; Referee: Anna-Marie Keighley

9 December 2018	Eastern Suburbs	0–0	Tasman United	Auckland
Sunday, 16:35 NZDT		Report		Stadium: Riverhills Park; Referee: Peter Linney

==== Round 10 ====
16 December 2018	Hawke's Bay United	1–4	Eastern Suburbs	Napier
Sunday, 14:00 NZDT	Mason-Smith 90+3'	Report	de Jong 24'; McCowatt 35'; Just 72'; Parker-Price 75'	Stadium: Bluewater Stadium; Referee: Cory Mills

16 December 2018	Southern United	0–1	Canterbury United	Dunedin
Sunday, 14:00 NZDT		Report	Hoyle 36'	Stadium: Tahuna Park; Referee: Antony Riley

16 December 2018	Tasman United	1–3	Auckland City	Nelson
Sunday, 14:00 NZDT	Hughes-Mason 49'	Report	Browne 5', 66'; Lopez 12' (pen.)	Stadium: Trafalgar Park; Referee: Campbell-Kirk Waugh

16 December 2018	Waitakere United	3–4	Hamilton Wanderers	Auckland
Sunday, 16:35 NZDT	Basset 4'; Butler 22'; Gordon 23'	Report	Bueno 55', 73', 77'; Semmy 80'	Stadium: The Trusts Arena; Referee: Nick Waldron

==== Round 11 ====
6 January 2019	Hawke's Bay United	4–1	Wellington Phoenix Reserves	Napier
Sunday, 13:00 NZDT	Mason-Smith 32', 48', 90+5'; Oliveri 90+3'	Report	Waine 24'	Stadium: Bluewater Stadium; Referee: Campbell-Kirk Waugh

6 January 2019	Southern United	1–6	Eastern Suburbs	Dunedin
Sunday, 14:00 NZDT	Coughlan 87' (pen.)	Report	de Jong 6'; McCowatt 43', 84'; Wooldridge 47'; Just 49', 52'	Stadium: Forsyth Barr Stadium; Referee: Calvin Berg

6 January 2019	Waitakere United	0–2	Auckland City	Auckland
Sunday, 14:00 NZDT		Report	López 39' (pen.), 58'	Stadium: The Trusts Arena; Referee: Cory Mills

6 January 2019	Team Wellington	2–1	Hamilton Wanderers	Wellington
Sunday, 14:00 NZDT	Hailemariam 20'; Sinclair 55'	Report	Hoyle 58'	Stadium: David Farrington Park; Referee: Anna-Marie Keighley

6 January 2019	Canterbury United	1–0	Tasman United	Christchurch
Sunday, 16:35 NZDT	Kowal 59'	Report		Stadium: English Park; Referee: Nick Waldron

==== Round 12 ====
12 January 2019	Wellington Phoenix Reserves	0–4	Eastern Suburbs	Wellington
Saturday, 16:45 NZDT		Report	McCowatt 9', 63', 66'; Just 13'	Stadium: Westpac Stadium; Referee: Allan Wilson

13 January 2019	Hamilton Wanderers	2–3	Tasman United	Auckland
Sunday, 14:00 NZDT	Semmy 40'; Tieku 47'	Report	Worrall 13' (pen.); Othman 26', 71'	Stadium: Centre Park; Referee: Peter Linney

13 January 2019	Auckland City	2–1	Southern United	Auckland
Sunday, 14:00 NZDT	Panzer 58' (o.g.); Tavano 65'	Report	Coughlan 39'	Stadium: Kiwitea Street; Referee: Antony Riley

13 January 2019	Canterbury United	5–2	Hawke's Bay United	Christchurch
Sunday, 14:00 NZDT	Hoyle 3'; Ogilvie 56' (pen.), 66'; Kowal 74'; King 88'	Report	Chettleburgh 28'; Lack 86'	Stadium: English Park; Referee: Calvin Berg

13 January 2019	Team Wellington	1–2	Waitakere United	Wellington
Sunday, 14:00 NZDT	Molloy 90+4'	Report	Burfoot 10'; Mechell 24'	Stadium: David Farrington Park; Referee: Nick Waldron

==== Round 13 ====
19 January 2019	Southern United	3–1	Hamilton Wanderers	Dunedin
Saturday, 14:00 NZDT	Coughlan 14', 24', 31'	Report	Pratt 23'	Stadium: Forsyth Barr Stadium

19 January 2019	Eastern Suburbs	5–1	Canterbury United	Auckland
Saturday, 16:00 NZDT	de Jong 49', 62'; Built 71'; Wooldridge 76'; McCowatt 88'	Report	King 20'	Stadium: Riverhills Park

20 January 2019	Waitakere United	0–2	Wellington Phoenix Reserves	Auckland
Sunday, 14:00 NZDT		Report	Waine 55'; Richards 59'	Stadium: McLennan Park

20 January 2019	Tasman United	2–2	Team Wellington	Blenheim
Sunday, 14:00 NZDT	Othman 85', 90+3'	Report	Kilkolly 21', 90+2'	Stadium: Lansdowne Park

20 January 2019	Hawke's Bay United	1–4	Auckland City	Napier
Sunday, 16:35 NZDT	Mason-Smith 58'	Report	Tavano 23'; Lea'alafa 48'; Vale 67'; Browne 90+1'	Stadium: Bluewater Stadium

==== Round 14 ====
27 January 2019	Auckland City	3–2	Eastern Suburbs	Auckland
Sunday, 14:00 NZDT	Lea'alafa 14', 47'; Kaltack 23'	Report	McCowatt 54'; Wooldridge 64'	Stadium: Kiwitea Street

27 January 2019	Canterbury United	2–1	Wellington Phoenix Reserves	Christchurch
Sunday, 14:00 NZDT	Hoyle 4', 79'	Report	Liddicoat 37' (o.g.)	Stadium: English Park

27 January 2019	Tasman United	3–1	Waitakere United	Nelson
Sunday, 14:00 NZDT	Othman 63'; Ridsdale 86'; McClay 90'	Report	Carpenter 16'	Stadium: Trafalgar Park

27 January 2019	Southern United	0–0	Team Wellington	Dunedin
Sunday, 14:00 NZDT		Report		Stadium: Forsyth Barr Stadium

27 January 2019	Hamilton Wanderers	4–4	Hawke's Bay United	Hamilton
Sunday, 16:35 NZDT	Bueno 6', 77'; Semmy 13'; Dowling 59'	Report	Akers 4'; Hoyle 10' (o.g.); Mason-Smith 14'; Hoy 89'	Stadium: Porritt Stadium

==== Round 15 ====
3 February 2019	Hawke's Bay United	3–6	Team Wellington	Napier
Sunday, 13:00 NZDT	Mason-Smith 31'; Chettleburgh 74'; Oliveri 90+2'	Report	Clapham 13', 49'; Kilkolly 33'; Sinclair 38'; Bevin 42'; Allen 88' (pen.)	Stadium: Bluewater Stadium

3 February 2019	Southern United	2–1	Waitakere United	Dunedin
Sunday, 14:00 NZDT	McDonald 65'; Coughlan 79' (pen.)	Report	Abba 40'	Stadium: Sunnyvale Park

3 February 2019	Canterbury United	0–1	Auckland City	Christchurch
Sunday, 14:00 NZDT		Report	Bonsu-Maro 69'	Stadium: English Park

3 February 2019	Wellington Phoenix Reserves	1–1	Tasman United	Porirua
Sunday, 15:00 NZDT	Waine 86'	Report	Hughes-Mason 45+1'	Stadium: Porirua Park

3 February 2019	Eastern Suburbs	5–1	Hamilton Wanderers	Auckland
Sunday, 16:35 NZDT	McCowatt 42', 45+3'; Just 50', 87'; de Jong 52'	Report	Bueno 37' (pen.)	Stadium: Riverhills Park

6 February 2019	Team Wellington	3–0	Wellington Phoenix Reserves	Wellington
Wednesday, 14:00 NZDT	Hailemariam 20'; Clapham 59'; Molloy 80'			Stadium: David Farrington Park

==== Round 16 ====
10 February 2019	Hamilton Wanderers	2–4	Canterbury United	Hamilton
Sunday, 14:00 NZDT	Tieku 28'; Nottage 62'	Report	Kowal 9', 53'; Ogilvie 32'; Hoyle 72'	Stadium: Porritt Stadium

10 February 2019	Auckland City	2–1	Wellington Phoenix Reserves	Auckland
Sunday, 14:00 NZDT	Browne 24'; Al-Khalisy 51'	Report	Gulley 61'	Stadium: Kiwitea Street

10 February 2019	Team Wellington	3–1	Eastern Suburbs	Wellington
Sunday, 14:00 NZDT	Allen 33', 45+1'; Clapham 39'	Report	McCowatt 27'	Stadium: David Farrington Park

==== Round 17 ====
17 February 2019	Tasman United	1–2	Southern United	Nelson
Sunday, 14:00 NZDT	Ellul 42'	Report	Coughlan 82', 89'	Stadium: Trafalgar Park

17 February 2019	Canterbury United	2–1	Team Wellington	Christchurch
Sunday, 14:00 NZDT	Ogilvie 51' (pen.); Clark 89'	Report	Bevin 55'	Stadium: English Park

17 February 2019	Auckland City	3–2	Hamilton Wanderers	Auckland
Sunday, 14:00 NZDT	Browne 48'; Bonsu-Maro 74'; Howieson 80'	Report	Semmy 89'; Bueno 90'	Stadium: Kiwitea Street

==== Round 18 ====
24 February 2019	Southern United	2–2	Wellington Phoenix Reserves	Dunedin
Sunday, 14:00 NZDT	McDonald 21'; Soromon 42'	Report	Stensness 37'; Waine 67'	Stadium: Sunnyvale Park

24 February 2019	Waitakere United	7–2	Hawke's Bay United	Auckland
Sunday, 14:00 NZDT	Carpenter 19'; Connor-McLean 24', 28', 44'; Abba 66'; Bassett 72'; Burfoot 90'	Report	Mason-Smith 38', 70' (pen.)	Stadium: The Trusts Arena

==== Round 19 ====
2 March 2019	Eastern Suburbs	5–1	Waitakere United	Auckland
Saturday, 16:00 NZDT	de Jong 28' (pen.), 33', 62'; McCowatt 43', 65'	Report	Browne 79'	Stadium: Riverhills Park

3 March 2019	Hawke's Bay United	2–2	Tasman United	Napier
Sunday, 13:00 NZDT	Mason-Smith 57', 82'	Report	MacDevitt 33'; Slotemaker 90+2'	Stadium: Bluewater Stadium

==== Round 20 ====
10 March 2019	Southern United	2–2	Hawke's Bay United	Dunedin
Sunday, 11:00 NZDT	Soromon 14'; Coughlan 36'	Report	Ifill 16' (pen.); Oliveri 44'	Stadium: Sunnyvale Park

10 March 2019	Wellington Phoenix Reserves	3–2	Hamilton Wanderers	Porirua
Sunday, 14:00 NZDT	Batchelor 30'; Waine 45+5', 90+4'	Report	Semmy 66'; Bueno 88' (pen.)	Stadium: Porirua Park

10 March 2019	Tasman United	1–3	Eastern Suburbs	Nelson
Sunday, 14:00 NZDT	Worrall 52'	Report	McCowatt 45' (pen.), 88'; de Jong 72'	Stadium: Trafalgar Park

10 March 2019	Team Wellington	1–2	Auckland City	Wellington
Sunday, 14:00 NZDT	Clapham 10'	Report	Bonsu-Maro 14', 72'	Stadium: David Farrington Park

10 March 2019	Waitakere United	1–4	Canterbury United	Auckland
Sunday, 16:35 NZDT	Bassett 6'	Report	Thurston 28' (pen.), 38'; Schwarz 43'; Kowal 60'	Stadium: The Trusts Arena

==== Round 21 ====
16 March 2019	Eastern Suburbs	3–0	Southern United	Auckland
Saturday, 16:00 NZDT	McCowatt 60', 64'; de Jong 69'	Report		Stadium: Riverhills Park

17 March 2019	Wellington Phoenix Reserves	3–1	Hawke's Bay United	Porirua
Sunday, 14:00 NZDT	Richards 52'; Batchelor 70' (pen.), 87'	Report	Mandair 15'	Stadium: Porirua Park

17 March 2019	Hamilton Wanderers	2–4	Team Wellington	Hamilton
Sunday, 14:00 NZDT	Dowling 34'; Pratt 90'	Report	Bevin 2'; Kilkolly 62', 72'; Clapham 69'	Stadium: Porritt Stadium

17 March 2019	Tasman United	0–0*	Canterbury United	Nelson
Sunday, 14:00 NZDT		Report		Stadium: Trafalgar Park

17 March 2019	Auckland City	5–2	Waitakere United	Auckland
Sunday, 16:35 NZDT	Tavano 9', 86'; Manickum 36', 45'; Bonsu-Maro 47'	Report	Conroy 82', 87'	Stadium: Kiwitea Street

* The match between Canterbury United and Tasman United was cancelled due to the Christchurch mosque shootings and awarded as a 0–0 draw.

== Finals series ==
=== Semi-finals ===
23 March 2019
Saturday, 14:35 NZDT

Eastern Suburbs	1–0	Canterbury United
de Jong 54'	Report

The Trusts Arena, Auckland
24 March 2019
Sunday, 14:35 NZDT

Auckland City	1–3	Team Wellington
Berlanga 69'	Report	Kilkolly 36' (pen.); Sinclair 55'; Stevens 90+3'

Kiwitea Street, Auckland
Referee: Antony Riley

=== Grand final ===
31 March 2019
Sunday, 16:35 NZDT

Eastern Suburbs	3–0	Team Wellington
McCowatt 7', 36', 58'	Report

North Harbour Stadium, Auckland
Referee: Nick Waldron (New Zealand)

Eastern Suburbs	Team Wellington

GK	1	Andrew Withers
DF	16	Dominic Wooldridge	(substituted off) 89'
DF	3	Kelvin Kalua	(substituted off) 90'
DF	4	Nando Pijnaker
MF	15	Dalton Wilkins	(yellow card) 76'
MF	7	Tim Payne (c)
MF	6	Harry Edge
MF	8	Owen Parker-Price
FW	14	Elijah Just	(substituted off) 81'
FW	10	Andre de Jong
FW	9	Callum McCowatt	7', 36', 58'
Substitutes:
GK	21	Justin Biega
DF	2	Alex Clayton
DF	5	Adam Thomas
MF	23	Campbell Strong	(substituted on) 89'
MF	17	Michael Built	(substituted on) 90'
MF	12	Kingsley Sinclair
FW	11	Mohammed Awad	(substituted on) 81'
Manager:
Danny Hay

GK	1	Scott Basalaj
DF	11	Bill Robertson	(substituted off) 51'
DF	4	Mario Ilich
DF	16	Taylor Schrijvers
MF	14	Jack-Henry Sinclair
MF	17	Alex Palezević
MF	12	Andy Bevin (c)	(yellow card) 38'
MF	18	Aaron Clapham	(substituted off) 54'
MF	15	Joel Stevens	(substituted off) 51'
FW	10	Nathanael Hailemariam
FW	16	Angus Kilkolly
Substitutes:
GK	22	Marcel Kampman
DF	3	Adam Mitchell
MF	7	Eric Molloy	(substituted on) 51'
MF	8	Henry Cameron
MF	13	Daniel Mulholland	(substituted on) 54'
FW	19	Ross Allen	(substituted on) 51'
Manager:
José Figueira

Steve Sumner Trophy:
Callum McCowatt

== Statistics ==
As of 17 March 2019

=== Top scorers ===
Rank	Player	Club	Goals
1	(New Zealand) Callum McCowatt	Eastern Suburbs	18
2	(New Zealand) Andre de Jong	Eastern Suburbs	16
2	(England) Sam Mason-Smith	Hawke's Bay United	16
4	(Republic of Ireland) Garbhan Coughlan	Southern United	13
5	(Uruguay) Martín Bueno	Hamilton Wanderers	12
6	(England) Stephen Hoyle	Canterbury United	10
6	(Papua New Guinea) Tommy Semmy	Hamilton Wanderers	10
8	(Spain) Javier López	Auckland City	8
8	(Syria) Ahmed Othman	Tasman United	8
8	(New Zealand) Ben Waine	Wellington Phoenix Reserves	8
8	(New Zealand) Hamish Watson	Team Wellington	8

=== Hat-tricks ===
Player	For	Against	Result	Date	Ref
(Italy) Martín Bueno	Hamilton Wanderers	Waitakere United	4–3	16 December 2018	
(England) Sam Mason-Smith	Hawke's Bay United	Wellington Phoenix Reserves	4–1	6 January 2019	
(New Zealand) Callum McCowatt	Eastern Suburbs	Wellington Phoenix Reserves	4–0	12 January 2019	
(Republic of Ireland) Garbhan Coughlan	Southern United	Hamilton Wanderers	3–1	19 January 2019	
(New Zealand) Alex Connor-McLean	Waitakere United	Hawke's Bay United	7–2	24 February 2019	
(New Zealand) Andre de Jong	Eastern Suburbs	Waitakere United	5–1	3 March 2019	
(New Zealand) Callum McCowatt	Eastern Suburbs	Team Wellington	3–0	31 March 2019	

=== Own goals ===
Player	Club	Against	Round
Jordan Vale	Auckland City	Tasman United	2
Sean Liddicoat	Canterbury United	Eastern Suburbs	4
Sean Liddicoat	Canterbury United	Team Wellington	8
Boyd Curry	Wellington Phoenix Reserves	Southern United	8
Erik Panzer	Southern United	Auckland City	12
James Hoyle	Hamilton Wanderers	Hawke's Bay United	14
