= 2019–20 New Zealand Football Championship =

ISPS Handa Premiership
- Season: 2019–20
- Champions: Auckland City
- Premiers: Auckland City
- OFC Champions League: Auckland City; Team Wellington
- Matches: 60
- Goals: 226 (3.77 per match)
- Top goalscorer: Myer Bevan (12)
- Biggest home win: Eastern Suburbs 6–0 Southern United (2 February 2020)
- Biggest away win: Canterbury United 1–6 Eastern Suburbs (19 January 2020)
- Highest scoring: Waitakere United 2–6 Auckland City (11 January 2020)
- All statistics correct as of 2 February 2020.

The 2019–20 New Zealand Football Championship season (currently known as the ISPS Handa Premiership for sponsorship reasons) was the sixteenth season of the NZFC since its establishment, in 2004. Ten teams compete in the competition with Eastern Suburbs and Auckland City representing the ISPS Handa Premiership in the 2020 OFC Champions League after finishing Champions (Eastern Suburbs) and Premiers (Auckland City) respectively in the 2018–19 competition.

== Clubs ==
| Team | Location | Stadium | Capacity | Manager | Kit manufacturer | Shirt sponsor |
|---|---|---|---|---|---|---|
| Auckland City | Auckland | Kiwitea Street | 3,250 | (England) José Figueira | Kappa | Trillian Trust Inc (Front) Carters (Back) |
| Canterbury United | Christchurch | English Park | 9,000 | (England) Lee Padmore | Nike | Robbie's Bar and Bistro |
| Eastern Suburbs | Auckland | Madills Farm | 5,000 | (England) Tony Readings | Lilywhites | Winger Motors |
| Hamilton Wanderers | Hamilton | Porritt Stadium | 5,000 | (New Zealand) Kale Herbert | Kelme | The Soccer Shop |
| Hawke's Bay United | Napier | Bluewater Stadium | 5,000 | (England) Chris Greatholder (England) Bill Robertson | Adidas | Thirsty Whale |
| Southern United | Dunedin | Sunnyvale Park | 1,000 | (Republic of Ireland) Paul O'Reilly | Lotto Sport Italia | Freshwater Solutions |
| Tasman United | Nelson | Trafalgar Park | 18,000 | (England) Jess Ibrom | Nike | Nelson Pine LVL (Front) Sprig & Fern (Back) |
| Team Wellington | Wellington | David Farrington Park | 2,250 | (New Zealand) Scott Hales | Nike | Stonewood Homes |
| Waitakere United | Auckland | The Trusts Arena | 4,900 | (New Zealand) Chris Milicich | Lotto Sport Italia | Mitre 10 Mega - Henderson (Front) Heritage Hotels (Back) |
| Wellington Phoenix | Wellington | Porirua Park | 1,900 | (England) Paul Temple | Adidas | Huawei |

=== Managerial changes ===
| Team | Outgoing manager | Manner of departure | Date of vacancy | Position on table | Incoming manager | Date of appointment |
|---|---|---|---|---|---|---|
| Hamilton Wanderers | (New Zealand) Ricki Herbert | Resigned | 4 December 2019 | 10th | (New Zealand) Kale Herbert | 4 December 2019 |

== Regular season ==
=== League table ===
On 18 March 2020, New Zealand Football announced that the 2019–20 New Zealand Football Championship season had been concluded due to the COVID-19 pandemic. The remaining two rounds of the regular season and the finals series were cancelled. Auckland City, who were leading the regular season table, were declared champions and also awarded the Minor Premiership, and qualified for the 2021 OFC Champions League together with Team Wellington, who were at second place in the regular season table.

| Pos | Team | Pld | W | D | L | GF | GA | GD | Pts | Qualification |
|---|---|---|---|---|---|---|---|---|---|---|
| 1 | Auckland City (C) | 16 | 11 | 4 | 1 | 42 | 15 | +27 | 37 | Qualification to OFC Champions League group stage |
| 2 | Team Wellington | 16 | 10 | 4 | 2 | 36 | 15 | +21 | 34 | Qualification to OFC Champions League group stage |
| 3 | Waitakere United | 16 | 8 | 3 | 5 | 35 | 32 | +3 | 27 | |
| 4 | Eastern Suburbs | 16 | 6 | 4 | 6 | 33 | 26 | +7 | 22 | |
| 5 | Tasman United | 16 | 6 | 2 | 8 | 27 | 26 | +1 | 20 | Disbanded at end of season |
| 6 | Hamilton Wanderers | 16 | 6 | 2 | 8 | 24 | 39 | −15 | 20 | |
| 7 | Southern United | 16 | 5 | 4 | 7 | 25 | 38 | −13 | 19 | Disbanded at end of season |
| 8 | Wellington Phoenix Reserves | 16 | 4 | 6 | 6 | 30 | 32 | −2 | 18 | |
| 9 | Hawke's Bay United | 16 | 4 | 3 | 9 | 32 | 44 | −12 | 15 | |
| 10 | Canterbury United | 16 | 2 | 4 | 10 | 19 | 36 | −17 | 10 | |

Source: NZ Football
(C) Champions

=== Positions by round ===
| Team ╲ Round | 1 | 2 | 3 | 4 | 5 | 6 | 7 | 8 | 9 | 10 | 11 | 12 | 13 | 14 | 15 | 16 | 17 | 18 | 19 | 20 | 21 |
|---|---|---|---|---|---|---|---|---|---|---|---|---|---|---|---|---|---|---|---|---|---|
| Auckland City | 4 | 3 | 1 | 1 | 1 | 1 | 1 | 1 | 1 | 1 | 1 | 1 | | | | | | | | | |
| Canterbury United | 7 | 6 | 6 | 7 | 8 | 8 | 9 | 7 | 8 | 9 | 10 | 10 | | | | | | | | | |
| Eastern Suburbs | 5 | 8 | 4 | 4 | 5 | 5 | 4 | 4 | 6 | 4 | 3 | 3 | | | | | | | | | |
| Hamilton Wanderers | 9 | 7 | 8 | 9 | 10 | 10 | 8 | 6 | 4 | 3 | 5 | 6 | | | | | | | | | |
| Hawke's Bay United | 6 | 5 | 3 | 3 | 3 | 3 | 3 | 3 | 3 | 6 | 7 | 7 | | | | | | | | | |
| Southern United | 2 | 4 | 7 | 5 | 6 | 6 | 7 | 8 | 7 | 8 | 8 | 8 | | | | | | | | | |
| Tasman United | 10 | 10 | 10 | 8 | 7 | 7 | 6 | 9 | 5 | 5 | 6 | 5 | | | | | | | | | |
| Team Wellington | 1 | 2 | 5 | 6 | 2 | 2 | 2 | 2 | 2 | 2 | 2 | 2 | | | | | | | | | |
| Waitakere United | 3 | 1 | 2 | 2 | 4 | 4 | 5 | 5 | 9 | 7 | 4 | 4 | | | | | | | | | |
| Wellington Phoenix | 8 | 9 | 9 | 10 | 9 | 9 | 10 | 10 | 10 | 10 | 9 | 9 | | | | | | | | | |

| Leader and qualification to OFC Champions League Group stage |
| Qualification to Finals series |

Updated to match(es) played on 26 January 2020. Source: NZ Football

Notes:

- Southern United beat Tasman United 4–0 in round 1, however it was ruled by NZ Football that they had played an ineligible player so forfeited the result. This meant the win was awarded as a 3–0 result to Tasman United.

=== Fixtures and results ===
The season was scheduled to be played on a home and away basis between November 2019 and March 2020, with the finals series being played in April 2020.

==== Round 1 ====
| 2 November 2019 | Hawke's Bay United | 2–3 | Auckland City | Napier |
| Saturday, 15:00 NZDT | Hoy 32'; Parker 68' | Report | Bevan 14', 21', 45' | Stadium: Bluewater Stadium; Referee: Ben O'Connell |

| 2 November 2019 | Waitakere United | 3–1 | Wellington Phoenix | Auckland |
| Saturday, 15:00 NZDT | Schnell 33'; McIsaac 43'; Porter 80' | Report | Sutton 2' | Stadium: Seddon Fields; Referee: Anna-Marie Keighley |

| 2 November 2019 | Southern United | 0–3* | Tasman United | Dunedin |
| Saturday, 16:00 NZDT | Stevens 31', 51'; Last 16'; Coughlan 58' | Report | | Stadium: Logan Park; Referee: Cory Mills |

| 3 November 2019 | Team Wellington | 5–1 | Hamilton Wanderers | Wellington |
| Sunday, 14:00 NZDT | Watson 15', 54'; Bassett 27'; Bevin 66'; Kilkolly 90' | Report | Tieku 31' | Stadium: David Farrington Park; Referee: Matthew Conger |

| 3 November 2019 | Eastern Suburbs | 1–0 | Canterbury United | Auckland |
| Sunday, 16:00 NZDT | Mechell 63' | Report | | Stadium: Madills Farm; Referee: Campbell-Kirk Kawana-Waugh |

*Southern United beat Tasman United 4–0 however it was ruled by NZ Football that they had played an ineligible player so forfeited the result. This meant the win was awarded as a 3–0 result to Tasman United.

==== Round 2 ====
| 10 November 2019 | Wellington Phoenix | 3–4 | Hawke's Bay United | Porirua |
| Sunday, 13:00 NZDT | Driehuis 88', 90+2', 90+3' | Report | Sacramento 8', 65', 78'; Selemani 49' | Stadium: Porirua Park; Referee: Calvin Berg |

| 10 November 2019 | Canterbury United | 2–1 | Southern United | Christchurch |
| Sunday, 14:00 NZDT | King 18'; Dalton 83' | Report | Coughlan 13' | Stadium: English Park; Referee: Matthew Conger |

| 10 November 2019 | Hamilton Wanderers | 3–0 | Eastern Suburbs | Hamilton |
| Sunday, 14:00 NZDT | Butler 33'; Tieku 35'; Semmy 44' | Report | | Stadium: Porritt Stadium; Referee: Sean Reilly |

| 10 November 2019 | Tasman United | 0–2 | Waitakere United | Nelson |
| Sunday, 14:00 NZDT | | Report | Connor-McLean 66', 90+3' | Stadium: Saxton Field; Referee: Ben O'Connell |

| 10 November 2019 | Auckland City | 2–2 | Team Wellington | Auckland |
| Sunday, 16:00 NZDT | Bevan 24' (pen.); Rogerson 78' | Report | Bassett 38'; Watson 47' (pen.) | Stadium: Kiwitea Street; Referee: Cory Mills |

==== Round 3 ====
| 16 November 2019 | Hamilton Wanderers | 0–5 | Auckland City | Cambridge |
| Saturday, 14:00 NZDT | | Report | Rogerson 28'; 37' (o.g.); Bevan 44' (pen.), 60'; Browne 87' | Stadium: John Kerkhof Park; Referee: Luke Gardner |

| 16 November 2019 | Waitakere United | 1–1 | Canterbury United | Auckland |
| Saturday, 15:00 NZDT | Connor-McLean 81' | Report | Liddicoat 15' | Stadium: Seddon Fields; Referee: Cory Mills |

| 16 November 2019 | Hawke's Bay United | 2–0 | Tasman United | Napier |
| Saturday, 16:00 NZDT | Delaney 9'; Robertson 34' | Report | | Stadium: Bluewater Stadium; Referee: Antony Riley |

| 16 November 2019 | Southern United | 2–4 | Eastern Suburbs | Dunedin |
| Saturday, 16:00 NZDT | Coughlan 49' (pen.); Brook 67' | Report | Drake 25'; Bueno 27'; Hoyle 47'; Awad 58' | Stadium: Logan Park; Referee: Ben O'Connell |

| 17 November 2019 | Team Wellington | 2–2 | Wellington Phoenix | Wellington |
| Sunday, 14:00 NZDT | Watson 23'; Bassett 26' | Report | Waine 55', 64' | Stadium: David Farrington Park; Referee: Sean Reilly |

==== Round 4 ====
| 23 November 2019 | Southern United | 4–0 | Hamilton Wanderers | Dunedin |
| Saturday, 16:30 NZDT | Al-Kalisy 4', 90+1'; O'Keeffe 11'; Stevens 90+4' | Report | | Stadium: Forsyth Barr Stadium; Referee: Calvin Berg |

| 23 November 2019 | Wellington Phoenix | 0–3 | Auckland City | Wellington |
| Saturday, 16:30 NZDT | | Report | Bevan 43' (pen.); Manickum 82'; Vale 89' | Stadium: Westpac Stadium; Referee: Ben O'Connell |

| 24 November 2019 | Canterbury United | 2–2 | Hawke's Bay United | Christchurch |
| Sunday, 14:00 NZDT | Mitchell 5'; Zeb 75' | Report | Selemani 64'; Goto 75' | Stadium: English Park; Referee: Sean Reilly |

| 24 November 2019 | Tasman United | 1–0 | Team Wellington | Nelson |
| Sunday, 14:00 NZDT | Saïko 62' (pen.) | Report | | Stadium: Saxton Field; Referee: Cory Mills |

| 24 November 2019 | Eastern Suburbs | 1–1 | Waitakere United | Auckland |
| Sunday, 16:00 NZDT | de Jong 40' | Report | Schnell 33' | Stadium: Madills Farm; Referee: Luke Gardner |

==== Round 5 ====
| 30 November 2019 | Waitakere United | 2–5 | Southern United | Auckland |
| Saturday, 15:00 NZDT | 50' (o.g.); Duncan 90' | Report | Coughlan 28'; Mackenzie 31'; Stevens 38', 51', 85' (pen.) | Stadium: Seddon Fields; Referee: Nick Waldron |

| 1 December 2019 | Hawke's Bay United | 3–3 | Eastern Suburbs | Napier |
| Sunday, 14:00 NZDT | Akers 39'; Selemani 65', 78' | Report | Hoyle 8', 12'; Gray 84' | Stadium: Bluewater Stadium; Referee: Campbell-Kirk Kawana-Waugh |

| 1 December 2019 | Hamilton Wanderers | 2–4 | Wellington Phoenix | Hamilton |
| Sunday, 14:00 NZDT | Wilke 2'; Tieku 10' | Report | Othman 15', 56'; Sutton 42' (pen.); Sprowson 80' | Stadium: Porritt Stadium; Referee: Cory Mills |

| 1 December 2019 | Team Wellington | 2–1 | Canterbury United | Wellington |
| Sunday, 14:00 NZDT | Sinclair 24'; McKeown 31' | Report | Ferguson 22' | Stadium: David Farrington Park; Referee: Calvin Berg |

| 1 December 2019 | Auckland City | 2–1 | Tasman United | Auckland |
| Sunday, 16:00 NZDT | Howieson 37'; Bevan 48' (pen.) | Report | Boss 75' | Stadium: Kiwitea Street; Referee: Anna-Marie Keighley |

==== Round 6 ====
| 7 December 2019 | Southern United | 2–2 | Hawke's Bay United | Dunedin |
| Saturday, 16:00 NZDT | Ledwith 48'; Brook 86' | Report | Delaney 2'; Selemani 56' | Stadium: Logan Park; Referee: Anna-Marie Keighley |

| 8 December 2019 | Canterbury United | 0–3 | Auckland City | Christchurch |
| Sunday, 14:00 NZDT | | Report | Bilen 65'; Bevan 71'; Howieson 90+3' | Stadium: English Park; Referee: Campbell-Kirk Kawana-Waugh |

| 8 December 2019 | Hamilton Wanderers | 1–2 | Waitakere United | Hamilton |
| Sunday, 14:00 NZDT | Terry 58' | Report | Burfoot 26'; Foulds 44' | Stadium: Porritt Stadium; Referee: Matthew Conger |

| 8 December 2019 | Tasman United | 1–1 | Wellington Phoenix | Nelson |
| Sunday, 14:00 NZDT | Tod-Smith 52' | Report | Heath 27' | Stadium: Trafalgar Park; Referee: Nick Waldron |

| 8 December 2019 | Eastern Suburbs | 2–3 | Team Wellington | Auckland |
| Sunday, 16:00 NZDT | Drake 48'; Bueno 55' (pen.) | Report | Bassett 60' (pen.), 80' (pen.); Sinclair 81' | Stadium: Madills Farm; Referee: Cory Mills |

==== Round 7 ====
| 14 December 2019 | Wellington Phoenix | 3–3 | Canterbury United | Porirua |
| Saturday, 13:00 NZDT | Othman 11', 84'; Heath 19' | Report | King 9'; Clapham 54'; Chang 90+7' | Stadium: Porirua Park; Referee: Campbell-Kirk Kawana-Waugh |

| 14 December 2019 | Auckland City | 0–0 | Eastern Suburbs | Auckland |
| Saturday, 16:30 NZDT | | Report | | Stadium: Kiwitea Street; Referee: Matthew Conger |

| 15 December 2019 | Hawke's Bay United | 4–2 | Waitakere United | Napier |
| Sunday, 14:00 NZDT | Selemani 30'; Signey 69'; Delaney 76', 84' | Report | Porter 13'; McIsaac 45+2' | Stadium: Bluewater Stadium; Referee: Nick Waldron |

| 15 December 2019 | Tasman United | 2–3 | Hamilton Wanderers | Nelson |
| Sunday, 14:00 NZDT | Tod-Smith 25'; Randall 45+2' | Report | Tieku 12'; Butler 51' (pen.); Semmy 56' | Stadium: Trafalgar Park; Referee: Cory Mills |

| 15 December 2019 | Team Wellington | 6–1 | Southern United | Wellington |
| Sunday, 14:00 NZDT | Sinclair 10', 67'; Bassett 13'; McKeown 47'; Stamecic 49'; Watson 64' | Report | Coughlan 72' | Stadium: David Farrington Park; Referee: Antony Riley |

==== Round 8 ====
| 20 December 2019 | Canterbury United | 2–0 | Tasman United | Christchurch |
| Friday, 18:30 NZDT | King 72'; Clapham 74' | Report | | Stadium: English Park; Referee: Calvin Berg |

| 21 December 2019 | Waitakere United | 1–1 | Team Wellington | Auckland |
| Saturday, 15:00 NZDT | Schnell 60' | Report | Watson 90+4' | Stadium: Seddon Fields; Referee: Campbell-Kirk Kawana-Waugh |

| 21 December 2019 | Southern United | 0–0 | Auckland City | Dunedin |
| Saturday, 16:00 NZDT | | Report | | Stadium: Logan Park; Referee: Dan Woulahan |

| 22 December 2019 | Eastern Suburbs | 2–2 | Wellington Phoenix | Auckland |
| Sunday, 16:00 NZDT | Bueno 55' (pen.); Drake 74' | Report | Waine 9'; Hooper 40' | Stadium: Madills Farm; Referee: Antony Riley |

| 22 December 2019 | Hamilton Wanderers | 2–1 | Hawke's Bay United | Hamilton |
| Sunday, 16:00 NZDT | Tieku 75'; Butler 90' | Report | Selemani 87' | Stadium: Porritt Stadium; Referee: Anna-Marie Keighley |

==== Round 9 ====
| 11 January 2020 | Waitakere United | 2–6 | Auckland City | Auckland |
| Saturday, 15:00 NZDT | Schnell 56'; Carlson-Du Toit 83' | Report | Manickum 20', 48'; Howieson 40'; Bevan 64'; Lewis 80'; Bonsu-Maro 86' | Stadium: Seddon Fields; Referee: Matthew Conger |

| 11 January 2020 | Wellington Phoenix | 1–1 | Southern United | Wellington |
| Saturday, 16:30 NZDT | Heath 32' | Report | Cromb 85' | Stadium: Sky Stadium; Referee: Antony Riley |

| 12 January 2020 | Canterbury United | 1–3 | Hamilton Wanderers | Christchurch |
| Sunday, 14:00 NZDT | King 68' | Report | Tieku 82'; Semmy 84', 88' | Stadium: English Park; Referee: Nick Waldron |

| 12 January 2020 | Tasman United | 2–0 | Eastern Suburbs | Nelson |
| Sunday, 14:00 NZDT | Saïko 49'; Brooks 90+7' | Report | | Stadium: Saxton Field; Referee: Calvin Berg |

| 12 January 2020 | Team Wellington | 4–0 | Hawke's Bay United | Wellington |
| Sunday, 14:00 NZDT | Watson 4', 5'; Mason-Smith 37'; Hailemariam 90+3' | Report | | Stadium: David Farrington Park; Referee: Ben O'Connell |

==== Round 10 ====
| 18 January 2020 | Tasman United | 5–0 | Southern United | Blenheim |
| Saturday, 16:00 NZDT | Saïko 6'; Slotemaker 15'; Watson 55'; Randall 60'; Vickers 69' | Report | | Stadium: Lansdowne Park; Referee: Ben O'Connell |

| 19 January 2020 | Canterbury United | 1–6 | Eastern Suburbs | Christchurch |
| Sunday, 14:00 NZDT | Ferguson 1' | Report | Thurston 29', 73' (pen.); Gray 37'; Bueno 41', 45'; Drake 83' | Stadium: English Park; Referee: Cory Mills |

| 19 January 2020 | Hamilton Wanderers | 1–0 | Team Wellington | Hamilton |
| Sunday, 14:00 NZDT | Tieku 11' | Report | | Stadium: Porritt Stadium; Referee: Antony Riley |

| 19 January 2020 | Wellington Phoenix | 3–4 | Waitakere United | Porirua |
| Sunday, 14:00 NZDT | Heath 22', 90+2'; Bidois 52' | Report | Porter 12'; Schnell 27'; Zambrano 54'; Connor-McLean 90+6' | Stadium: Porirua Park; Referee: Sean Reilly |

| 19 January 2020 | Auckland City | 4–2 | Hawke's Bay United | Auckland |
| Sunday, 18:00 NZDT | Bevan 37', 65'; Berlanga 38'; Howieson 90+1' | Report | Robertson 34'; Kilkolly 54' | Stadium: Kiwitea Street; Referee: Calvin Berg |

==== Round 11 ====
| 25 January 2020 | Waitakere United | 3–2 | Tasman United | Auckland |
| Saturday, 15:00 NZDT | Gibert 45+3'; Porter 53'; Burfoot 72' | Report | Saïko 3'; Watson 49' | Stadium: Seddon Fields; Referee: Luke Gardner |

| 25 January 2020 | Southern United | 2–1 | Canterbury United | Dunedin |
| Saturday, 16:00 NZDT | Ledwith 61'; Cromb 85' | Report | King 23' | Stadium: Logan Park; Referee: Nick Waldron |

| 26 January 2020 | Hawke's Bay United | 0–2 | Wellington Phoenix | Napier |
| Sunday, 14:00 NZDT | | Report | Othman 55'; Old 64' | Stadium: Bluewater Stadium; Referee: Cory Mills |

| 26 January 2020 | Eastern Suburbs | 3–0 | Hamilton Wanderers | Auckland |
| Sunday, 16:00 NZDT | Bueno 4', 53'; Thurston 24' | Report | | Stadium: Madills Farm; Referee: Ben O'Connell |

| 26 January 2020 | Team Wellington | 0–0 | Auckland City | Wellington |
| Sunday, 16:00 NZDT | | Report | | Stadium: David Farrington Park; Referee: Antony Riley |

==== Round 12 ====
| 1 February 2020 | Wellington Phoenix | 0–1 | Team Wellington | Porirua |
| Saturday, 14:00 NZDT | | Report | Sinclair 90+6' (pen.) | Stadium: Porirua Park; Referee: Ben O'Connell |

| 2 February 2020 | Eastern Suburbs | 6–0 | Southern United | Auckland |
| Sunday, 12:00 NZDT | Bueno 9', 47', 53'; Built 22'; Drake 70'; Kalua 78' | Report | | Stadium: Madills Farm; Referee: Antony Riley |

| 2 February 2020 | Auckland City | 3–1 | Hamilton Wanderers | Auckland |
| Sunday, 14:00 NZDT | Tade 34'; 44' (o.g.); Bevan 77' | Report | Ott 84' | Stadium: Kiwitea Street; Referee: Luke Gardner |

| 2 February 2020 | Tasman United | 3–1 | Hawke's Bay United | Nelson |
| Sunday, 14:00 NZDT | Saïko 34', 73'; Winterton 49' | Report | Selemani 90+5' | Stadium: Saxton Field; Referee: Campbell-Kirk Kawana-Waugh |

| 2 February 2020 | Canterbury United | 1–2 | Waitakere United | Christchurch |
| Sunday, 16:00 NZDT | Richards 55' | Report | Burfoot 77'; Schnell 85' | Stadium: English Park; Referee: Cory Mills |

==== Round 13 ====
| 8 February 2020 | Waitakere United | v | Eastern Suburbs | Auckland |
| Saturday, 16:00 NZDT | | | | Stadium: Seddon Fields |

| 9 February 2020 | Hamilton Wanderers | v | Southern United | Hamilton |
| Sunday, 12:00 NZDT | | | | Stadium: Porritt Stadium |

| 9 February 2020 | Hawke's Bay United | v | Canterbury United | Napier |
| Sunday, 13:00 NZDT | | | | Stadium: Bluewater Stadium |

| 9 February 2020 | Auckland City | v | Wellington Phoenix | Auckland |
| Sunday, 14:00 NZDT | | | | Stadium: Kiwitea Street |

| 9 February 2020 | Team Wellington | v | Tasman United | Wellington |
| Sunday, 14:00 NZDT | | | | Stadium: David Farrington Park |

==== Round 14 ====
| 15 February 2020 | Southern United | v | Waitakere United | Dunedin |
| Saturday, 16:00 NZDT | | | | Stadium: Logan Park |

| 15 February 2020 | Wellington Phoenix | v | Hamilton Wanderers | Auckland |
| Saturday, 16:30 NZDT | | | | Stadium: Eden Park |

==== Round 15 ====
| 23 February 2020 | Eastern Suburbs | v | Hawke's Bay United | Auckland |
| Sunday, 14:00 NZDT | | | | Stadium: Madills Farm |

| 23 February 2020 | Tasman United | v | Auckland City | Nelson |
| Sunday, 14:00 NZDT | | | | Stadium: Trafalgar Park |

| 23 February 2020 | Canterbury United | v | Team Wellington | Christchurch |
| Sunday, 16:00 NZDT | | | | Stadium: English Park |

==== Round 16 ====
| 29 February 2020 | Waitakere United | v | Hamilton Wanderers | Auckland |
| Saturday, 16:00 NZDT | | | | Stadium: Seddon Fields |

| 1 March 2020 | Hawke's Bay United | v | Southern United | Napier |
| Sunday, 13:00 NZDT | | | | Stadium: Bluewater Stadium |

| 1 March 2020 | Team Wellington | v | Eastern Suburbs | Wellington |
| Sunday, 14:00 NZDT | | | | Stadium: David Farrington Park |

==== Round 17 ====
| 8 March 2020 | Auckland City | v | Canterbury United | Auckland |
| Sunday, 14:00 NZDT | | | | Stadium: Kiwitea Street |

| 8 March 2020 | Wellington Phoenix | v | Tasman United | Porirua |
| Sunday, 14:00 NZDT | | | | Stadium: Porirua Park |

==== Round 18 ====
| 14 March 2019 | Waitakere United | v | Hawke's Bay United | Auckland |
| Saturday, 15:00 NZDT | | | | Stadium: Seddon Fields |

| 14 March 2020 | Southern United | v | Team Wellington | Dunedin |
| Saturday, 16:00 NZDT | | | | Stadium: Logan Park |

| 15 March 2020 | Hamilton Wanderers | v | Tasman United | Hamilton |
| Sunday, 12:00 NZDT | | | | Stadium: Porritt Stadium |

| 15 March 2020 | Canterbury United | v | Wellington Phoenix | Christchurch |
| Sunday, 14:00 NZDT | | | | Stadium: English Park |

| 15 March 2020 | Eastern Suburbs | v | Auckland City | Auckland |
| Sunday, 16:00 NZDT | | | | Stadium: Madills Farm |

==== Round 19 ====
| 22 March 2020 | Wellington Phoenix | v | Eastern Suburbs | Porirua |
| Sunday, 13:00 NZDT | | | | Stadium: Porirua Park |

| 22 March 2020 | Hawke's Bay United | v | Hamilton Wanderers | Napier |
| Sunday, 14:00 NZDT | | | | Stadium: Bluewater Stadium |

| 22 March 2020 | Auckland City | v | Southern United | Auckland |
| Sunday, 14:00 NZDT | | | | Stadium: Kiwitea Street |

| 22 March 2020 | Team Wellington | v | Waitakere United | Wellington |
| Sunday, 15:00 NZDT | | | | Stadium: David Farrington Park |

| 22 March 2020 | Tasman United | v | Canterbury United | Nelson |
| Sunday, 16:00 NZDT | | | | Stadium: Trafalgar Park |

==== Round 20 ====
| 28 March 2020 | Southern United | v | Wellington Phoenix | Dunedin |
| Saturday, 16:00 NZDT | | | | Stadium: Logan Park |

| 29 March 2020 | Hamilton Wanderers | v | Canterbury United | Hamilton |
| Sunday, 14:00 NZDT | | | | Stadium: Porritt Stadium |

| 29 March 2020 | Auckland City | v | Waitakere United | Auckland |
| Sunday, 14:00 NZDT | | | | Stadium: Kiwitea Street |

| 29 March 2020 | Eastern Suburbs | v | Tasman United | Auckland |
| Sunday, 14:00 NZDT | | | | Stadium: Madills Farm |

| 29 March 2020 | Hawke's Bay United | v | Team Wellington | Napier |
| Sunday, 16:00 NZDT | | | | Stadium: Bluewater Stadium |

== Finals series ==
=== Semi-finals ===
11/12 April 2020

| 1st | v | 4th |

TBC
11/12 April 2020

| 2nd | v | 3rd |

TBC

=== Grand final ===
19 April 2020
Sunday, 16:35 NZDT

| Winner SF1 | v | Winner SF2 |

North Harbour Stadium, Auckland

== Statistics ==
As of 2 February 2020

=== Top scorers ===
| Rank | Player | Club | Goals |
|---|---|---|---|
| 1 | Myer Bevan | Auckland City | 13 |
| 2 | Martín Bueno | Eastern Suburbs | 10 |
| 3 | Ahinga Selemani | Hawke's Bay United | 8 |
| 3 | Hamish Watson | Team Wellington | 8 |
| 5 | Derek Tieku | Hamilton Wanderers | 7 |
| 6 | Ollie Bassett | Team Wellington | 6 |
| 6 | Jean-Philippe Saiko | Tasman United | 6 |
| 6 | Dane Schnell | Waitakere United | 6 |
| 9 | Reid Drake | Eastern Suburbs | 5 |
| 9 | Byron Heath | Wellington Phoenix Reserves | 5 |
| 9 | George King | Canterbury United | 5 |
| 9 | Ahmed Othman | Wellington Phoenix Reserves | 5 |
| 9 | Jack-Henry Sinclair | Team Wellington | 5 |

=== Hat-tricks ===
| Round | Player | For | Against | Result | Date | Ref |
|---|---|---|---|---|---|---|
| 1 | Myer Bevan | Auckland City | Waitakere United | 3–2 | 2 November 2019 | |
| 2 | Dylan Sacramento | Hawke's Bay United | Wellington Phoenix Reserves | 3–4 | 10 November 2019 | |
| 2 | Blake Driehuis | Wellington Phoenix Reserves | Hawke's Bay United | 3–4 | 10 November 2019 | |
| 5 | Joel Stevens | Southern United | Hawke's Bay United | 5–2 | 1 December 2019 | |
| 12 | Martín Bueno | Eastern Suburbs | Southern United | 6–0 | 2 February 2020 | |
