= 2017–18 New Zealand Football Championship =

ISPS Handa Premiership
- Season: 2017–18
- Champions: Auckland City
- Premiers: Auckland City
- Matches: 103
- Goals: 321 (3.12 per match)
- Top goalscorer: Emiliano Tade (16 goals)
- Biggest home win: Auckland City 6–0 Hamilton Wanderers (13 November 2017)
- Biggest away win: Wellington Phoenix 1–7 Eastern Suburbs (4 February 2018)
- Highest scoring: Tasman United 4–4 Hamilton Wanderers (14 January 2018); Hamilton Wanderers 3–5 Eastern Suburbs (21 January 2018); Wellington Phoenix 1–7 Eastern Suburbs (4 February 2018); Wellington Phoenix 3–5 Canterbury United (11 February 2018); Waitakere United 5–3 Tasman United (18 March 2018)
- All statistics correct as of 1 April 2018.

The 2017–18 New Zealand Football Championship season (currently known as the ISPS Handa Premiership for sponsorship reasons) was the fourteenth season of the NZFC since its establishment in 2004. Ten teams competed in the competition with Team Wellington and Auckland City representing the ISPS Handa Premiership in the 2018 OFC Champions League after finishing Champions and Premiers respectively in the 2016–17 competition.

== Clubs ==
Team	Location	Stadium	Capacity	Manager	Kit manufacturer	Shirt sponsor
Auckland City	Sandringham, Auckland	Kiwitea Street	3,250	(Spain) Ramon Tribulietx	Kappa	Hi-Chew (front) Trillian Trust Inc (Back) Carters (Back)
Canterbury United	Christchurch	English Park	9,000	(New Zealand) Willy Gerdsen	Nike	Robbie's Bar and Bistro
Eastern Suburbs	Panmure, Auckland	Bill McKinlay Park	5,000	(New Zealand) Danny Hay	Lilywhites	Winger Motors
Hamilton Wanderers	Hamilton	Porritt Stadium	5,000	(New Zealand) Ricki Herbert	Nike	The Soccer Shop
Hawke's Bay United	Napier	Bluewater Stadium	5,000	(England) Brett Angell	Adidas	Kinetic Electrical
Southern United	Dunedin	Sunnyvale Park	1,000	(Republic of Ireland) Paul O'Reilly	Lotto Sport Italia	Freshwater Solutions
Tasman United	Nelson	Trafalgar Park	18,000	(Croatia) Davor Tavich	Joma	Nelson Pine LVL (Front) Sprig & Fern (Back)
Team Wellington	Wellington	David Farrington Park	2,250	(England) Jose Figueira	Nike	Stonewood Homes
Waitakere United	Whenuapai, Auckland	The Trusts Arena	4,900	(New Zealand) Chris Milicich	Lotto Sport Italia	Jerry Clayton BMW (Front) Heritage Hotels (Back)
Wellington Phoenix	Wellington	David Farrington Park	2,250	(England) Chris Greenacre	Adidas	Huawei

=== Kits ===
Auckland City	Canterbury United	Eastern Suburbs	Hamilton Wanderers	Hawke's Bay United
Southern United	Team Wellington	Tasman United	Waitakere United	Wellington Phoenix

== Regular season ==
=== League table ===
Pos	Team	Pld	W	D	L	GF	GA	GD	Pts	Qualification
1	Auckland City (C)	18	12	4	2	41	12	+29	40	Qualification to the Champions League and Finals series
2	Team Wellington	18	11	4	3	39	20	+19	37	Qualification to the Champions League and Finals series
3	Canterbury United	18	11	3	4	35	20	+15	36	Qualification to the Finals series
4	Eastern Suburbs	18	10	2	6	37	24	+13	32	Qualification to the Finals series
5	Southern United	18	6	6	6	28	27	+1	24	
6	Tasman United	18	6	5	7	34	39	−5	23	
7	Waitakere United	18	5	4	9	30	34	−4	19	
8	Hawke's Bay United	18	5	4	9	21	36	−15	19	
9	Wellington Phoenix Reserves	18	4	3	11	27	53	−26	15	
10	Hamilton Wanderers	18	1	3	14	23	50	−27	6	

Updated to match(es) played on 18 March 2018. Source: NZ Football
(C) Champions

=== Positions by round ===
Team ╲ Round	1	2	3	4	5	6	7	8	9	10	11	12	13	14	15	16	17	18
Auckland City	9	4	2	1	1	1	1	1	2	2	3	3	1	1	1	1	1	1
Team Wellington	3	2	4	2	2	2	2	2	1	1	1	1	2	2	2	2	2	2
Canterbury United	5	7	8	8	8	8	8	6	6	4	4	4	4	4	4	4	3	3
Eastern Suburbs	2	3	1	3	3	3	4	4	3	3	2	2	3	3	3	3	4	4
Southern United	4	6	7	6	5	5	5	7	7	7	8	8	8	8	6	6	6	5
Tasman United	1	1	3	5	4	4	6	5	5	6	6	5	5	5	5	5	5	6
Waitakere United	5	9	6	7	7	6	3	3	4	5	5	6	6	6	7	7	8	7
Hawke's Bay United	7	5	5	4	6	7	7	8	9	8	7	7	7	7	8	8	7	8
Wellington Phoenix	7	8	9	9	9	9	9	9	8	9	9	9	9	9	9	9	9	9
Hamilton Wanderers	10	10	10	10	10	10	10	10	10	10	10	10	10	10	10	10	10	10

Leader and qualification to AFC Champions League Group stage
Qualification to Finals series

Source: NZ Football

Notes:

- Auckland City and Team Wellington played their Round 8 game early on 15 October 2017, and had an extra game played between Rounds 1 and 7.
- Canterbury United were tied with Waitakere United at the end of Round 1.
- Hawke's Bay United were tied with Wellington Phoenix Reserves at the end of Round 1.
- Auckland City and Eastern Suburbs had a game in hand between Rounds 7 and 12, with their Round 7 game played before the start of Round 13 on 24 January 2018.
- Wellington Phoenix and Canterbury United had a game in hand between Rounds 4 and 14, with their Round 4 game played before the start of Round 15 on 11 February 2018.
- Auckland City beat Tasman United 3–1 in round 9, however it was ruled by NZ Football that they had played an ineligible player so forfeited the result. This meant the win was awarded as a 3–0 result to Tasman.

=== Fixtures and results ===
The 2017–18 season sees every team play the other both home and away. The Round 7 and round 8 matches between Team Wellington and Eastern Suburbs vs Auckland City have been moved due to Auckland City playing at 2017 FIFA Club World Cup at the start of December. The match between Wellington Phoenix Reserves and Canterbury United was postponed till February 2018 due to New Zealand playing their intercontinental playoff against Peru that same day in Wellington.

==== Round 8 (rescheduled) ====
15 October 2017	Team Wellington	3–1	Auckland City	Wellington
Sunday, 14:00 NZDT	39' (o.g.); Hilliar 77'; Stevens 88'	Report	Bright 20'	Stadium: David Farrington Park

==== Round 1 ====
22 October 2017	Hamilton Wanderers	1–4	Tasman United	Hamilton
Sunday, 13:00 NZDT	Evans 30' (pen.)	Report	Allan 15'; Al-Kalisy 35', 36'; Ifill 71'	Stadium: Porritt Stadium; Referee: Nick Waldron

22 October 2017	Southern United	2–2	Auckland City	Dunedin
Sunday, 14:00 NZDT	Furlong 25'; Connor 87'	Report	De Vries 12'; Tade 86'	Stadium: Forsyth Barr Stadium; Referee: Campbell-Kirk Waugh

22 October 2017	Team Wellington	1–3	Eastern Suburbs	Wellington
Sunday, 14:00 NZDT	Bevin 70'	Report	de Jong 30', 49', 84' (pen.)	Stadium: David Farrington Park; Referee: Calvin Berg

22 October 2017	Canterbury United	1–1	Waitakere United	Christchurch
Sunday, 16:35 NZDT	Hoyle 43'	Report	Linderboom 73'	Stadium: English Park; Referee: Ben O'Connell

23 October 2017	Hawke's Bay United	0–0	Wellington Phoenix Reserves	Napier
Monday, 16:35 NZDT		Report		Stadium: Bluewater Stadium; Referee: Antony Riley

==== Round 2 ====
28 October 2017	Wellington Phoenix Reserves	2–5	Team Wellington	Wellington
Saturday, 14:00 NZDT	Rogerson 14', 84' (pen.)	Report	Bevin 22'; Jackson 38'; Stevens 55'; Kilkolly 81' (pen.); Hailemariam 90+4'	Stadium: David Farrington Park; Referee: Calvin Berg

29 October 2017	Hamilton Wanderers	0–1	Hawke's Bay United	Hamilton
Sunday, 14:00 NZDT		Report	Wakino 21'	Stadium: Porritt Stadium; Referee: Cory Mills

29 October 2017	Southern United	0–1	Eastern Suburbs	Dunedin
Sunday, 14:00 NZDT		Report	de Jong 86'	Stadium: Sunnyvale Park; Referee: Matt Conger

29 October 2017	Canterbury United	0–1	Tasman United	Christchurch
Sunday, 14:00 NZDT		Report	Elliot 85'	Stadium: English Park; Referee: Anna-Marie Keighley

29 October 2017	Waitakere United	0–5	Auckland City	Auckland
Sunday, 16:35 NZDT		Report	Tade 36' (pen.), 73'; de Vries 43', 63', 90'	Stadium: The Trusts Arena; Referee: Peter Linney

==== Round 3 ====
4 November 2017	Eastern Suburbs	2–1	Hamilton Wanderers	Auckland
Saturday, 14:00 NZDT	Dyer 62'; Mata 87'	Report	Shaw 79'	Stadium: William Green Domain; Referee: Nick Waldron

5 November 2017	Hawke's Bay United	1–1	Team Wellington	Napier
Sunday, 13:00 NZDT	Taye 40'	Report	Gulley 10'	Stadium: Bluewater Stadium; Referee: John Rowbury

5 November 2017	Wellington Phoenix Reserves	0–5	Waitakere United	Wellington
Sunday, 14:00 NZDT		Report	Ohtsuka 17'; Linderboom 35'; Shaw 40', 76'; Estay 88'	Stadium: David Farrington Park; Referee: Matthew Conger

5 November 2017	Tasman United	2–2	Southern United	Nelson
Sunday, 14:00 NZDT	Allan 39'; Smith 59'	Report	Furlong 9' (pen.); Ridden 76'	Stadium: Trafalgar Park; Referee: Antony Riley

5 November 2017	Auckland City	3–1	Canterbury United	Auckland
Sunday, 16:35 NZDT	McCowatt 9', 65'; Tade 16'	Report	Nicklaw 90+2'	Stadium: Kiwitea Street; Referee: Campbell-Kirk Waugh

==== Round 4 ====
12 November 2017	Auckland City	6–0	Hamilton Wanderers	Auckland
Sunday, 14:00 NZDT	De Vries 14', 90'; McCowatt 27'; Tade 42', 78'; 67' (o.g.)	Report		Stadium: Kiwitea Street; Referee: Calvin Berg

12 November 2017	Team Wellington	2–1	Tasman United	Wellington
Sunday, 14:00 NZDT	Jackson 7', 90+3'	Report	Ifill 56'	Stadium: David Farrington Park; Referee: Matt Conger

12 November 2017	Eastern Suburbs	1–2	Hawke's Bay United	Auckland
Sunday, 14:00 NZDT	Mata 77'	Report	Christiesen 20', 52'	Stadium: William Green Domain; Referee: Peter Linney

12 November 2017	Waitakere United	1–2	Southern United	Auckland
Sunday, 14:00 NZDT	Franchini-Pasten 70'	Report	Furlong 90+1', 90+3'	Stadium: The Trusts Arena; Referee: Anna-Marie Keighley

==== Round 5 ====
18 November 2017	Tasman United	0–0	Waitakere United	Nelson
Saturday, 13:00 NZDT		Report		Stadium: Trafalgar Park; Referee: Campbell-Kirk Waugh

19 November 2017	Southern United	2–1	Hawke's Bay United	Dunedin
Sunday, 14:00 NZDT	Ridden 71'; Coughlan 90'	Report	Palezevic 43'	Stadium: Sunnyvale Park; Referee: Peter Linney

19 November 2017	Canterbury United	3–2	Eastern Suburbs	Christchurch
Sunday, 14:00 NZDT	Pendrigh 64'; Hoyle 83', 90+3'	Report	Vale 22'; Tieku 44'	Stadium: English Park; Referee: Cory Mills

19 November 2017	Auckland City	4–0	Wellington Phoenix Reserves	Auckland
Sunday, 14:00 NZDT	Tade 39', 68'; Kim 65'; Tavano 66'	Report		Stadium: Kiwitea Street; Referee: Antony Riley

19 November 2017	Hamilton Wanderers	1–3	Team Wellington	Hamilton
Sunday, 16:35 NZDT	Pasagic 45+1'	Report	Kilkolly 3', 8', 44'	Stadium: Porritt Stadium; Referee: Anna-Marie Keighley

==== Round 6 ====
25 November 2017	Tasman United	2–2	Eastern Suburbs	Nelson
Saturday, 13:00 NZDT	Smith 21'; Ifill 77'	Report	Cox 15'; Tieku 43'	Stadium: Trafalgar Park; Referee: John Rowbury

25 November 2017	Auckland City	5–0	Hawke's Bay United	Auckland
Saturday, 14:00 NZDT	Tade 13', 64' (pen.); De Vries 53', 71'; Morgan 75'	Report		Stadium: Kiwitea Street; Referee: Cory Mills

25 November 2017	Wellington Phoenix Reserves	2–2	Southern United	Wellington
Saturday, 16:45 NZDT	Rufer 9' (pen.); McGarry 46'	Report	Coughlan 72', 82'	Stadium: Westpac Stadium; Referee: Avnit Maharaj

26 November 2017	Canterbury United	3–0	Hamilton Wanderers	Christchurch
Sunday, 14:00 NZDT	Pendrigh 25', 49'; Hoyle 80'	Report		Stadium: English Park; Referee: Calvin Berg

26 November 2017	Waitakere United	2–1	Team Wellington	Auckland
Sunday, 14:00 NZDT	Ohtsuka 17'; Linderboom 45'	Report	Molloy 90+3'	Stadium: The Trusts Arena; Referee: Peter Linney

==== Round 7 ====
3 December 2017	Tasman United	0–2	Wellington Phoenix Reserves	Nelson
Sunday, 14:00 NZDT		Report	Singh 31'; Rogerson 78' (pen.)	Stadium: Trafalgar Park; Referee: Robert Fleetham

3 December 2017	Hawke's Bay United	1–3	Waitakere United	Napier
Sunday, 14:00 NZDT	Cain 40'	Report	Linderboom 1'; Collett 16'; Butler 51'	Stadium: Bluewater Stadium; Referee: Nick Waldron

3 December 2017	Team Wellington	2–0	Canterbury United	Wellington
Sunday, 14:00 NZDT	Kilkolly 13'; Sinclair 64'	Report		Stadium: David Farrington Park; Referee: John Rowbury

3 December 2017	Hamilton Wanderers	2–2	Southern United	Hamilton
Sunday, 14:00 NZDT	Built 19'; Varela 48'	Report	Ridden 1'; Guardiola 5'	Stadium: Porritt Stadium; Referee: Hayden McCabe

==== Round 8 ====
9 December 2017	Eastern Suburbs	2–2	Wellington Phoenix Reserves	Auckland
Saturday, 14:00 NZDT	Lowry 65' (o.g.); Payne 80'	Report	McGarry 10'; Lowry 90+4'	Stadium: Bill McKinlay Park; Referee: Hayden McCabe

10 December 2017	Southern United	0–2	Canterbury United	Dunedin
Sunday, 14:00 NZDT		Report	Hoyle 64'; Nakamura 81' (pen.)	Stadium: Sunnyvale Park; Referee: Nick Waldron

10 December 2017	Hawke's Bay United	1–1	Tasman United	Napier
Sunday, 14:00 NZDT	Hoy 17'	Report	Kowal 64'	Stadium: Bluewater Stadium; Referee: Cory Mills

10 December 2017	Hamilton Wanderers	2–4	Waitakere United	Hamilton
Sunday, 16:35 NZDT	Semmy 36', 42'	Report	Linderboom 23'; Collett 60'; Manickum 62'; James 82'	Stadium: Porritt Stadium; Referee: Anna-Marie Keighley

==== Round 9 ====
16 December 2017	Wellington Phoenix Reserves	3–1	Hamilton Wanderers	Wellington
Saturday, 13:00 NZDT	Tongue 53'; McGarry 82' (pen.); Whyte 88'	Report	Semmy 46'	Stadium: David Farrington Park; Referee: Hayden McCabe

17 December 2017	Auckland City	0–3*	Tasman United	Auckland
Sunday, 14:00 NZDT	White 39'; De Vries 42', 85' (pen.)	Report	Kaltak	Stadium: Kiwitea Street; Referee: Campbell-Kirk Waugh

17 December 2017	Team Wellington	0–0	Southern United	Wellington
Sunday, 14:00 NZDT		Report		Stadium: David Farrington Park; Referee: Antony Riley

17 December 2017	Canterbury United	3–0	Hawke's Bay United	Christchurch
Sunday, 14:00 NZDT	Hoyle 18'; Nicklaw 20'; Ogilvie 30' (pen.)	Report		Stadium: English Park; Referee: Anna-Marie Keighley

17 December 2017	Waitakere United	0–2	Eastern Suburbs	Auckland
Sunday, 16:35 NZDT		Report	De Jong 19', 40'	Stadium: The Trusts Arena; Referee: Allan Wilson

* Auckland City beat Tasman United 3–1 however it was ruled by NZ Football that they had played an ineligible player so forfeited the result. This meant the win was awarded as a 3–0 result to Tasman United.

==== Round 10 ====
6 January 2018	Eastern Suburbs	2–0	Southern United	Auckland
Saturday, 14:00 NZDT	Prattley 22'; Built 90+1'	Report		Stadium: Bill McKinlay Park; Referee: Arnit Maharaj

7 January 2018	Hawke's Bay United	2–2	Hamilton Wanderers	Napier
Sunday, 14:00 NZDT	Christensen 39'; Palezevic 83'	Report	McHenery 48' (o.g.); Pasagic 64'	Stadium: Bluewater Stadium; Referee: Peter Linney

7 January 2018	Auckland City	2–2	Waitakere United	Auckland
Sunday, 14:00 NZDT	Tade 29'; McCowatt 67'	Report	James 48'; Linderboom 57' (pen.)	Stadium: Kiwitea Street; Referee: Matthew Conger

7 January 2018	Team Wellington	4–1	Wellington Phoenix Reserves	Wellington
Sunday, 14:00 NZDT	Bevin 12'; Sinclair 14'; Hailemariam 35'; Fenton 43'	Report	Wood 32'	Stadium: David Farrington Park; Referee: Cory Mills

7 January 2018	Tasman United	0–6	Canterbury United	Nelson
Sunday, 16:35 NZDT		Report	Nakamura 31', 44', 80'; Spain 40'; Ogilvie 67'; Hoyle 75'	Stadium: Trafalgar Park; Referee: Nick Waldron

==== Round 11 ====
13 January 2018	Auckland City	1–1	Southern United	Auckland
Saturday, 14:00 NZDT	Lea'alafa 47'	Report	Wade 70'	Stadium: Kiwitea Street

13 January 2018	Eastern Suburbs	2–1	Team Wellington	Auckland
Saturday, 14:00 NZDT	Tieku 48'; de Jong 90+1'	Report	Hailemariam 18'	Stadium: Bill McKinlay Park

13 January 2018	Wellington Phoenix Reserves	2–3	Hawke's Bay United	Wellington
Saturday, 16:45 NZDT	Whyte 48'; Singh 61'	Report	Taye 23'; Hoy 47'; Thurston 53'	Stadium: Westpac Stadium

14 January 2018	Tasman United	4–4	Hamilton Wanderers	Nelson
Sunday, 14:00 NZDT	Tod-Smith 8'; Ifill 21' (pen.), 48' (pen.), 60'	Report	Pasagic 17' (pen.), 28' (pen.); Semmy 54'; Varela 89'	Stadium: Trafalgar Park

14 January 2018	Waitakere United	1–1	Canterbury United	Auckland
Sunday, 14:00 NZDT	Darkwa 58'	Report	31' (o.g.)	Stadium: The Trusts Arena

==== Round 12 ====
21 January 2018	Hamilton Wanderers	3–5	Eastern Suburbs	Hamilton
Sunday, 14:00 NZDT	Pasagic 23' (pen.); Hayes 86'; Semmy 90'	Report	Tieku 8'; Dyer 45', 90+2'; de Jong 73'; Palmer 87'	Stadium: Porritt Stadium; Referee: Campbell-Kirk Waugh

21 January 2018	Southern United	2–4	Tasman United	Dunedin
Sunday, 14:00 NZDT	Last 24'; Ridsdale 90+2'	Report	Allan 38'; Ifill 44' (pen.); Kowal 68', 87'	Stadium: Sunnyvale Park; Referee: Matthew Conger

21 January 2018	Canterbury United	0–2	Auckland City	Christchurch
Sunday, 14:00 NZDT		Report	Tade 22', 45+2'	Stadium: English Park; Referee: Cory Mills

21 January 2018	Waitakere United	2–3	Wellington Phoenix Reserves	Auckland
Sunday, 14:00 NZDT	Cain 27'; Linderboom 42'	Report	Watson 28'; Collett 53' (o.g.); Whyte 84'	Stadium: The Trusts Arena; Referee: Antony Riley

21 January 2018	Team Wellington	2–1	Hawke's Bay United	Wellington
Sunday, 16:35 NZDT	Kayara 69'; Allen 75'	Report	De St Croix 85'	Stadium: Jerry Collins Stadium; Referee: Nick Waldron

==== Round 7 (rescheduled) ====
24 January 2018	Eastern Suburbs	0–2	Auckland City	Auckland
Wednesday, 18:00 NZDT		Report	Tade 20'; Lea'alafa 71'	Stadium: William Green Domain; Referee: Campbell-Kirk Waugh

==== Round 13 ====
27 January 2018	Tasman United	1–4	Team Wellington	Nelson
Saturday, 14:00 NZDT	Wright 88'	Report	Sinclair 12', 60'; Allen 40'; Mulholland 87'	Stadium: Saxton Field; Referee: Calvin Berg

28 January 2018	Hawke's Bay United	2–0	Eastern Suburbs	Palmerston North
Sunday, 13:00 NZDT	Marowa 52'; Wakino 75'	Report		Stadium: Memorial Park; Referee: Matthew Conger

28 January 2018	Southern United	1–0	Waitakere United	Dunedin
Sunday, 14:00 NZDT	Furlong 85' (pen.)	Report		Stadium: Sunnyvale Park; Referee: Hayden McCabe

28 January 2018	Canterbury United	3–2	Wellington Phoenix Reserves	Christchurch
Sunday, 14:00 NZDT	Nakamura 13'; Schwarz 73'; Terris 80'	Report	Singh 30', 49'	Stadium: English Park; Referee: Robert Fleetham

28 January 2018	Hamilton Wanderers	0–1	Auckland City	Tauranga
Sunday, 16:35 NZDT		Report	Lea'alafa 22'	Stadium: Links Avenue; Referee: Allan Wilson

==== Round 14 ====
4 February 2018	Wellington Phoenix Reserves	1–7	Eastern Suburbs	Wellington
Sunday, 14:00 NZDT	Rogerson 45+1'	Report	de Jong 3', 59'; Built 36', 50'; Moore 65' (o.g.); Tieku 68'; Dyer 72'	Stadium: David Farrington Park; Referee: Ben O'Connell

4 February 2018	Tasman United	5–2	Hawke's Bay United	Nelson
Sunday, 14:00 NZDT	Kowal 4'; Ifill 28', 83', 86'; Matthysen 85'	Report	Robertson 79'; Taye 87' (pen.)	Stadium: Saxton Field; Referee: Anna-Marie Keighley

4 February 2018	Canterbury United	2–1	Southern United	Christchurch
Sunday, 14:00 NZDT	Mitchell 21'; Ogilvie 85' (pen.)	Report	Furlong 43' (pen.)	Stadium: English Park; Referee: Campbell-Kirk Waugh

4 February 2018	Waitakere United	1–2	Hamilton Wanderers	Auckland
Sunday, 14:00 NZDT	Collett 25'	Report	Semmy 20'; Frank 67'	Stadium: The Trusts Arena; Referee: Cory Mills

4 February 2018	Auckland City	0–0	Team Wellington	Auckland
Sunday, 16:35 NZDT		Report		Stadium: Kiwitea Street; Referee: Nick Waldron

==== Round 4 (rescheduled) ====
11 February 2018	Wellington Phoenix Reserves	3–5	Canterbury United	Wellington
Sunday, 14:00 NZDT	Rogerson 1'; Ebbinge 10', 48'	Report	King 41'; Ogilvie 50' (pen.), 90+2'; Hoyle 59'; Schwarz 82'	Stadium: David Farrington Park; Referee: Allan Wilson

==== Round 15 (split round) ====
11 February 2018	Hawke's Bay United	0–3	Auckland City	Napier
Sunday, 14:00 NZDT		Report	McCowatt 23'; Lea'alafa 29'; Rogers 52'	Stadium: Bluewater Stadium; Referee: Calvin Berg

11 February 2018	Eastern Suburbs	3–0	Tasman United	Auckland
Sunday, 16:35 NZDT	Built 48'; Prattley 74'; Mata 87'	Report		Stadium: Bill McKinlay Park; Referee: Hayden McCabe

18 February 2018	Southern United	4–0	Wellington Phoenix Reserves	Dunedin
Sunday, 14:00 NZDT	Ridsdale 15'; Ledwith 37'; Treadwell 49'; Ridden 89'	Report		Stadium: Sunnyvale Park; Referee: Cory Mills

18 February 2018	Team Wellington	4–1	Waitakere United	Wellington
Sunday, 14:00 NZDT	Sinclair 5' (Pen.); Bevin 9', 73'; Allen 51'	Report	Ohtsuka 25'	Stadium: David Farrington Park; Referee: Antony Riley

18 February 2018	Hamilton Wanderers	0–1	Canterbury United	Hamilton
Sunday, 16:35 NZDT		Report	King 57'	Stadium: Porritt Stadium; Referee: Hayden McCabe

==== Round 16 (split round) ====
11 February 2018	Southern United	1–3	Team Wellington	Dunedin
Sunday, 14:00 NZDT	Coughlan 21'	Report	Kayara 18'; Sinclair 58'; Allen 68'	Stadium: Sunnyvale Park; Referee: Ben O'Connell

17 February 2018	Tasman United	0–1	Auckland City	Nelson
Sunday, 14:00 NZDT		Report	McCowatt 40'	Stadium: Saxton Field; Referee: Robert Fleetham

24 February 2018	Hamilton Wanderers	1–2	Wellington Phoenix Reserves	Tauranga
Saturday, 14:00 NZDT	Riley 50'	Report	McGarry 45'; Pratt 77' (o.g.)	Stadium: Links Avenue; Referee: Anna-Marie Keighley

25 February 2018	Hawke's Bay United	1–2	Canterbury United	Napier
Sunday, 16:35 NZDT	de Croix 63'	Report	Hoyle 77'; Nakamura 86'	Stadium: Bluewater Stadium; Referee: Antony Riley

4 March 2018	Eastern Suburbs	2–1	Waitakere United	Auckland
Sunday, 16:35 NZDT	Tieku 1'; de Jong 24' (pen.)	Report	Shaw 29'	Stadium: Bill McKinlay Park; Referee: Campbell-Kirk Waugh

==== Round 17 ====
10 March 2018	Southern United	3–1	Hamilton Wanderers	Dunedin
Saturday, 14:00 NZDT	Ridsdale 7', 31'; Coughlan 14'	Report	Semmy 83'	Stadium: Sunnyvale Park; Referee: Nick Waldron

11 March 2018	Wellington Phoenix Reserves	2–3	Tasman United	Wellington
Sunday, 14:00 NZDT	Patterson 23' (pen.); Whyte 79'	Report	Kowal 11'; Ifill 26' (pen.), 90+2'	Stadium: David Farrington Park; Referee: Peter Linney

11 March 2018	Canterbury United	0–0	Team Wellington	Christchurch
Sunday, 14:00 NZDT		Report		Stadium: English Park; Referee: Hayden McCabe

11 March 2018	Waitakere United	1–2	Hawke's Bay United	Auckland
Sunday, 14:00 NZDT	Thomas 83'	Report	Adjei 28', 42'	Stadium: The Trusts Arena; Referee: Allan Wilson

11 March 2018	Auckland City	1–0	Eastern Suburbs	Auckland
Sunday, 16:35 NZDT	McCowatt 82'	Report		Stadium: Kiwitea Street; Referee: Antony Riley

==== Round 18 ====
17 March 2018	Eastern Suburbs	1–2	Canterbury United	Auckland
Saturday, 14:00 NZDT	Tieku 6' (pen.)	Report	Richards 87'; de Vries 90'	Stadium: William Green Domain; Referee: Cory Mills

17 March 2018	Hawke's Bay United	1–3	Southern United	Napier
Saturday, 14:00 NZDT	de St Croix 83'	Report	Coughlan 23', 44' (pen.), 62'	Stadium: Bluewater Stadium; Referee: Hayden McCabe

17 March 2018	Wellington Phoenix Reserves	0–2	Auckland City	Auckland
Saturday, 16:35 NZDT		Report	Tade 36', 41'	Stadium: QBE Stadium; Referee: Arnit Maharaj

18 March 2018	Waitakere United	5–3	Tasman United	Auckland
Sunday, 14:00 NZDT	Cain 20', 31' (pen.), 42'; Zambrano 81'; Manickum 90+2'	Report	Kowal 35'; Tod-Smith 52'; Elliot 77'	Stadium: Fred Taylor Park; Referee: Anna-Marie Keighley

18 March 2018	Team Wellington	3–2	Hamilton Wanderers	Wellington
Sunday, 14:00 NZDT	Bevin 6', 87'; Sinclair 16'	Report	Pratt 59'; Pasagic 67' (pen.)	Stadium: David Farrington Park; Referee: Peter Linney

== Finals series ==
=== Semi-finals ===
24 March 2018
Saturday, 14:05 NZDT

Auckland City	4–0	Eastern Suburbs
Tade 56' (pen.), 86'; McCowatt 71'; Wilkins 90+4'	Report

Kiwitea Street, Auckland
Referee: Cory Mills
25 March 2018
Sunday, 14:05 NZDT

Team Wellington	1–0	Canterbury United
Kayara 27'	Report

David Farrington Park, Wellington
Referee: Nick Waldron

=== Grand final ===
1 April 2018
Sunday, 16:35 NZDT

Auckland City	1–0	Team Wellington
McCowatt 83'	Report

QBE Stadium, Auckland
Attendance: 2,196
Referee: Campbell-Kirk Waugh (New Zealand)

Auckland City	Team Wellington

GK	1	Eñaut Zubikarai	(yellow card) 90+2'
DF	9	Darren White
DF	5	Ángel Berlanga (c)
DF	6	Te Atawhai Hudson-Wihongi
MF	7	Cameron Howieson
MF	8	Albert Riera
MF	11	Fabrizio Tavano		(substituted off) 69'
MF	15	Dan Morgan
FW	20	Emiliano Tade	(yellow card) 47'
FW	9	Kris Bright		(substituted off) 69'
FW	26	Callum McCowatt
Substitutes:
GK	24	Conor Tracey
DF	25	Owen Parker-Price
DF	13	Alfie Rogers
MF	4	Mario Bilen		(substituted in) 69'
MF	17	Reid Drake
MF	27	Dalton Wilkins
FW	19	Micah Lea'alafa		(substituted in) 69'
Manager:
Ramon Tribulietx

GK	1	Scott Basalaj
DF	2	Justin Gulley (c)
DF	4	Mario Ilich
DF	3	Scott Hilliar	(yellow card) 80'
MF	10	Nathanael Hailemariam
MF	7	Eric Molloy
MF	11	Mario Barcia		(substituted off) 89'
MF	12	Andy Bevin
FW	13	Roy Kayara
FW	14	Jack-Henry Sinclair		(substituted off) 62'
FW	19	Ross Allen
Substitutes:
GK	22	Marcel Kampman
DF	5	Liam Wood
MF	20	Daniel Mulholland
FW	16	Angus Kilkolly		(substituted in) 62'
FW	21	Hamish Watson		(substituted in) 89'
Manager:
José Figueira

Steve Sumner Trophy:
Callum McCowatt

Assistant referees:
Gareth Sheehan
Edward Cook
Fourth official:
Nick Waldron

== Statistics ==
As of 18 March 2018

=== Top scorers ===
Rank	Player	Club	Goals
1	(Argentina) Emiliano Tade	Auckland City	16
2	(Barbados) Paul Ifill	Tasman United	12
3	(New Zealand) Andre de Jong^{1}	Eastern Suburbs	11
4	(England) Stephen Hoyle	Canterbury United	9
5	(Republic of Ireland) Garbhan Coughlan	Southern United	8
5	(New Zealand) Ryan De Vries^{2}	Auckland City	8
7	(New Zealand) Andrew Bevin	Team Wellington	7
7	(South Africa) Keegan Linderboom	Waitakere United	7
7	(New Zealand) Callum McCowatt	Auckland City	7
7	(Papua New Guinea) Tommy Semmy	Hamilton Wanderers	7
7	(New Zealand) Jack-Henry Sinclair	Team Wellington	7
7	(Ghana) Derek Tieku	Eastern Suburbs	7

^{1} Transferred to Maccabi Hakoah in Australia, 5 March 2018.
^{2} Transferred to FC Gifu in Japan, 17 January 2018.

=== Hat-tricks ===
Player	For	Against	Result	Date	Ref
(New Zealand) Andre de Jong	Eastern Suburbs	Team Wellington	3–1	22 October 2017	
(New Zealand) Ryan de Vries	Auckland City	Waitakere United	5–0	29 October 2017	
(New Zealand) Angus Kilkolly	Team Wellington	Hamilton Wanderers	3–1	19 November 2017	
(Japan) Futa Nakamura	Canterbury United	Tasman United	6–0	7 January 2018	
(Barbados) Paul Ifill	Tasman United	Hamilton Wanderers	4–4	14 January 2018	
(Barbados) Paul Ifill	Tasman United	Hawke's Bay United	5–2	4 February 2018	
(Republic of Ireland) Garbhan Coughlan	Southern United	Hawke's Bay United	3–1	17 March 2018	
(New Zealand) Ryan Cain	Waitakere United	Tasman United	5–3	17 March 2018	

=== Own goals ===
Player	Club	Against	Round
Unknown	Hamilton Wanderers	Auckland City	4
Unknown	Auckland City	Team Wellington	8
Ryan Lowry	Wellington Phoenix Reserves	Eastern Suburbs	8
Daniel McHenery	Hawke's Bay United	Hamilton Wanderers	10
Unknown	Waitakere United	Canterbury United	11
Julyan Collett	Waitakere United	Wellington Phoenix Reserves	12
Liam Moore	Wellington Phoenix Reserves	Eastern Suburbs	14
Xavier Pratt	Hamilton Wanderers	Wellington Phoenix Reserves	16
