= Liam MacDevitt =

English TV presenter (born 1994)

- Born: Liam Joshua MacDevitt; 26 October 1994 (age 32); Reading, Berkshire, England
- Occupation: Television presenter
- Years active: 2020–present

Liam Joshua MacDevitt (born 26 October 1994) is an English television presenter and former footballer. He is a regular broadcaster within football & Formula 1 Coverage on television in the UK & US. Among his presenting credits are appearances for BBC, CBS, ITV, Amazon Prime and F1. On the BBC he has appeared on programmes such as Football Focus, and Match of the Day.

Ahead of the 2025/26 season he joined TNT Sports as a reporter across their Premier League, FA Cup, UEFA Champions League & Europa League coverage.

He has interviewed winners and nominees of the PFA Players' Player of the Year awards, including Mohamed Salah, Erling Haaland, Bukayo Saka, and others.

== Career ==
Liam MacDevitt
Personal information
- Positions: Forward; midfielder

Youth career
- Yeovil Town
- Reading

Senior career*
Years	Team	Apps	(Gls)
2012–2014	Yeovil Town	0	(0)
2013	Swindon Town	0	(0)
2013	Bristol City		
2013	→ Farnborough (loan)		
2013	→ Stoke City (loan)	1	
2013	Gosport Borough		
2016	St Albans City	3	(1)
2016	Horsham	21	(9)
2016	Greenwich Borough	36	(22)
2017	Lewes		
2018	Southern United		
2019	Tasman United	4	(1)
2019–2020	Stalybridge Celtic	22	(9)
2020–2021	Bury AFC	52	(19)
- * Club domestic league appearances and goals

MacDevitt began his football career in the youth system at Reading before joining Yeovil Town's academy. On 1 July 2012, he signed a two-year professional contract with Yeovil Town. Yeovil Town. During his time at Yeovil, he scored twice in a 4–2 FA Youth Cup defeat to Oxford United and made a first-team appearance against Exeter City on 11 August 2012. against Oxford United

In his second year, Yeovil Town were promoted to the EFL Championship.

In 2015, MacDevitt joined Gosport Borough in the National league South scoring on his debut in a 6–3 victory against Sholing.

MacDevitt then joined St. Albans City on a free transfer. Making his debut in a 1–0 loss against Ebbsfleet United.

In 2018, MacDevitt joined Southern United in the ISPS Handa Premiership, In January 2019 he was transferred to Tasman United.

Returning to England in 2019, he signed with Stalybridge Celtic until 2020, before concluding his playing career with Bury AFC in 2021 to transition into broadcasting.

== Honours ==
Yeovil Town

- Football League One play-offs: 2013
