= Sam Mason-Smith =

English footballer

Personal information
- Date of birth: 25 October 1991 (age 35)
- Place of birth: Four Gotes, England
- Position: Forward

Team information
- Current team: Greytown
- Number: 22

Youth career
- Histon

Senior career*
| Years | Team | Apps | (Gls) |
| –2010 | Histon | | |
| 2010–2011 | Soham Town Rangers | | |
| 2011 | Richmond Athletic | | |
| 2011–2014 | Team Wellington | 16 | (2) |
| 2012–2015 | Miramar Rangers | | |
| 2015–2018 | Wairarapa United | 41 | (41) |
| 2015–2018 | Hawke's Bay United | 34 | (17) |
| 2018 | Stellenbosch | 13 | (1) |
| 2018–2019 | Hawke's Bay United | 16 | (16) |
| 2019 | Preston Lions | 13 | (3) |
| 2019–2021 | Team Wellington | 14 | (1) |
| 2020–2024 | Miramar Rangers | 18 | (20) |
| 2025–2026 | Wellington Olympic | 17 | (4) |
| 2026– | Greytown | 0 | (0) |
- * Club domestic league appearances and goals as of 18:30, 8 March 2026 (UTC)

Sam Mason-Smith (born 25 October 1991) is an English professional footballer who plays as a forward for New Zealand Capital Premier club Greytown.

== Career ==
=== New Zealand ===
Embarking on a move to New Zealand's Richmond Athletic with three other Englishmen for 2011, Mason-Smith gained a switch to Team Wellington who play in the national league. With the National League in New Zealand played during the summer, Mason-Smith played his winter season for local team Miramar Rangers. He continued playing for the two teams until 2015 when he signed with Hawke's Bay United to play National League, finishing the 2015–16 with six goals. Mason-Smith also didn't return to Miramar Rangers for the 2016 season, instead playing for Wairarapa United Central Premier League. In one game, he converted five goals in a 5-0 trouncing of Petone which was a record for the most goals by a Wairarapa athlete in a Central League meeting, the previous being four. The following season with Wairarapa United, Mason-Smith was tasked with being responsible for Wairarapa's strikeforce again. After a successful season he was awarded the 2017 Central League Player of the Year.

=== South Africa ===
Heading to South Africa for a one-month trial with Stellenbosch near the end of 2017, the Englishman contended in the 2017–18 Nedbank Cup with them, meeting Kaizer Chiefs in the Round of 16.

=== Return to New Zealand and Australia ===
In March 2019, after a prolific spell with New Zealand Football Championship side Hawke's Bay United, Mason-Smith joined Victorian State League Division 1 side Preston Lions.

After playing winter with Preston Lion's, Mason-Smith returned to Team Wellington for the 2019–20 season of the New Zealand Football Championship.

== Honours ==
=== Club ===
Wairarapa United:

- Central Premier League Player of the Year: 2017
