= Andrew Abba =

Solomon Islands footballer (born 1989)

Personal information
- Full name: Andrew Abba
- Date of birth: 25 November 1989 (age 36)
- Place of birth: Solomon Islands
- Height: 1.57 m (5 ft 2 in)
- Position: Forward

Team information
- Current team: Northern Rovers
- Number: 14

Youth career
- –2006: Temotu Arrows
- 2006–2008: Nelson College

Senior career*
Years	Team	Apps	(Gls)
2008–2010	Hawke's Bay United	25	(7)
2010–2011	Team Wellington	9	(1)
2011–2012	Wellington Olympic		
2012–2013	Team Wellington	0	(0)
2015–2017	Stop Out		
2018	Western Springs		
2018–2019	Waitakere United	16	(5)
2020	Forrest Hill Milford		
2021–	Northern Rovers	13	(1)

International career^{‡}
2005	Solomon Islands U17		
2013–	Solomon Islands	7	(5)
- * Club domestic league appearances and goals as of 2 December 2018 ‡ National team caps and goals as of 18 July 2019

Andrew Abba (born 25 November 1989) is a Solomon Islands footballer who plays as a forward for Waitakere United in the ISPS Handa Premiership. He was named to the national team in 2013, and made his debut in a FIFA World Cup qualifier against Tahiti.

He moved to Nelson College at the age of 17 after receiving a scholarship, and has played his club football in the country ever since.

== International career ==
=== International goals ===
Scores and results list the Solomon Islands' goal tally first.

No.	Date	Venue	Opponent	Score	Result	Competition
1.	8 June 2019	National Stadium, Kallang, Singapore	Singapore	2–1	3–4	Friendly
2.	8 July 2019	National Soccer Stadium, Apia, Samoa	American Samoa	5–0	13–0	2019 Pacific Games
3.	8 July 2019	National Soccer Stadium, Apia, Samoa	American Samoa	7–0	13–0	2019 Pacific Games
4.	8 July 2019	National Soccer Stadium, Apia, Samoa	American Samoa	8–0	13–0	2019 Pacific Games
5.	8 July 2019	National Soccer Stadium, Apia, Samoa	American Samoa	13–0	13–0	2019 Pacific Games
