= Kiernan Hughes-Mason =

English footballer (born 1991)

Personal information
- Full name: Kiernan Peter Hughes-Mason
- Date of birth: 22 October 1991 (age 35)
- Place of birth: Hackney, London, England
- Positions: Winger; striker

Youth career
- 1999–2006: Arsenal
- 2006–2007: Tottenham Hotspur
- 2007–2009: Millwall

Senior career*
Years	Team	Apps	(Gls)
2009–2011	Millwall	2	(0)
2010	→ Cheltenham Town (loan)	0	(0)
2010	→ Tooting & Mitcham United (loan)		
2010	→ Tooting & Mitcham United (loan)		
2011	→ Chelmsford City (loan)	6	(0)
2011	Tooting & Mitcham United		
2011–2012	Kettering Town	12	(1)
2012	Grimsby Town	11	(2)
2012–2014	Welling United	54	(11)
2013	→ Concord Rangers (loan)	4	(1)
2014	→ Hayes & Yeading United (loan)	3	(1)
2014	Maidstone United	9	(0)
2014–2016	Leatherhead	112	(31)
2016	Walton Casuals	5	(1)
2016–2017	Hastings United	27	(14)
2017	Grays Athletic	6	(1)
2017–2018	Barking	33	(10)
2018	North Wellington		
2018–2019	Tasman United		
2019	Barking	1	(0)
2019–2020	Hythe Town	8	(0)
2020	Woodford Town	1	(0)
2020–2022	Hashtag United	39	(2)
2022	Saffron Walden Town	5	(1)
2022–2023	Tilbury	16	(0)
2023–2024	Tower Hamlets	44	(7)
2024	Corinthian-Casuals	1	(0)
2024	Enfield Borough	6	(1)

Managerial career
- 2023–2024: Tower Hamlets (joint)
- 2024: Enfield Borough
- * Club domestic league appearances and goals

Kiernan Peter Hughes-Mason (born 22 October 1991) is an English former football player and coach. He played as a winger or striker.

He notably played professional football for Millwall, Cheltenham Town and Grimsby Town, as well as having brief spells in New Zealand with North Wellington and Tasman United. He has spent most of his career in non-league football and has played for Tooting & Mitcham United, Chelmsford City, Kettering Town, Welling United, Concord Rangers, Hayes & Yeading United, Maidstone United, Leatherhead, Walton Casuals, Hastings United, Grays Athletic, Barking, Hythe Town, Hashtag United, Saffron Walden Town and Tilbury.

In August 2024, Hughes-Mason was convicted of grievous bodily harm and child cruelty, and was subsequently sacked as manager of Enfield Borough. He was jailed for 14 years.

== Club career ==
=== Youth career ===
Hughes-Mason started his career at the age of seven, playing alongside Jack Wilshere and Emmanuel Frimpong in the youth ranks at Arsenal. At the age of 14, he was deemed too small by the club and released. He then joined local rivals Tottenham Hotspur for a season but failed to earn a scholarship at the club. Following his release, Hughes-Mason was offered a scholarship with Millwall.

=== Professional career ===
After two years in the youth section, Hughes-Mason made his professional debut for Millwall in August 2009 and the age of 17. Named on the bench the following game, he struggled to break into the team and joined Cheltenham Town in April 2010. However, he failed to make an appearance for the League Two club, where he remained until the end of the season.

In July 2010, Hughes-Mason went on trial with Swindon Town alongside PSG forward Yoann Arquin but was unable to impress and later returned to Millwall. In August 2010, he joined Tooting & Mitcham United on a one-month loan, before returning for a second spell in November 2010.

In February 2011, Hughes-Mason joined Conference South outfit Chelmsford City on loan and made six appearances in the latter stages of the season. At the end of the 2010–11 season, he was released by Millwall.

Hughes-Mason trialed with Burton Albion in July 2011, and Grimsby Town two weeks later, but was unable to earn a contract with either club.

=== Semi-professional career ===
In August 2011, Hughes-Mason re-joined Tooting & Mitcham United on non-contract terms, before earning a move to Kettering Town in October 2011. Despite his previously unsuccessful trial, he returned to professional football and signed with Conference Premier club Grimsby Town in January 2012, and remained with the club until the end of the season.

In May 2012, the striker completed a move to Conference South side Welling United, where he earned promotion back to the Premier division in his inaugural season with the club. Scoring 11 league goals and making 49 appearances in all competitions during the season, he couldn't have the same impact in his second campaign. Hughes-Mason made 15 league appearances during the 2013-14 season, and joined Concord Rangers on loan in December 2013. He also had a brief loan at Hayes & Yeading United, scoring once in three appearances.

Following his departure from Welling United late into the season, Hughes-Mason joined Maidstone United for the remainder of the campaign, making nine league appearances.

In July 2014, he joined league Isthmian Premier Division rivals Leatherhead. A successful first season saw Hughes-Mason feature regularly for the recently promoted club with 21 goals in all competitions. He remained in the first team set-up the following season with 14 goals, and added another two to his tally during the 2016–17 season. Continuing to feature regularly under newly appointed manager Jimmy Bullard, he recorded 14 appearances in all competitions prior to his departure.

In October 2016, Hughes-Mason joined Isthmian Division One South side Walton Casuals. He scored his first goal for the club in his second appearance, netting in a 3–2 win over Hastings United.

In November 2016, he was snapped up by league rivals Hastings United. Hughes-Mason scored on his debut with a 90th-minute goal in a 7–0 victory at Chatham Town, and opened the scoring three days later when making his home debut in a 3–0 win over Greenwich Borough.

After a season with Barking, where he scored ten goals, Hughes-Mason left the club to move to New Zealand and join North Wellington. He then joined New Zealand Premiership side Tasman United ahead of the new campaign.

He returned to England in 2019 to re-sign for Barking, before signing for Hythe Town in September 2019.

In 2020, Hughes-Mason became the manager for the newly formed Hashtag United reserve team. On 19 October 2020, he made his debut for the first team as a 75th-minute substitute for striker George Smith against Clapton, scoring a goal in the 90th minute.

On 6 June 2022, Saffron Walden Town announced the signing of Hughes-Mason from Hashtag United. He made his league debut in their first game of the season, a 2–1 win against Clapton.

In February 2024, Hughes-Mason made a singular appearance for Corinthian-Casuals.

== International career ==
Hughes-Mason was born in the London Borough of Hackney, and is of Antigua and Barbudan, Dominican and Grenadian descent. In August 2012, he was called up to the Antigua and Barbuda Under-20 squad, who he qualifies for through his mother, for the 2013 CONCACAF U-20 Championship qualifiers against Dominica, Grenada and Curaçao. However, when Hughes-Mason reported to the games, he was unable to play due to a mix-up regarding eligibility as he did not meet the age criteria.

== Managerial career ==
On 7 February 2023, Hughes-Mason joined Tower Hamlets as joint-manager.

Ahead of the 2024–25 season, Hughes-Mason was appointed manager of Enfield Borough, before being dismissed on 21 August 2024 following his criminal conviction.

== Child cruelty conviction ==
In August 2024, Hughes-Mason was convicted of grievous bodily harm and child cruelty, after inflicting 17 separate injuries to his ex-partner's daughter in a series of attacks in 2019 and 2020. Hughes-Mason's acts required the child to need 24-hour care as a result of the "life-changing brain injuries". On 10 September 2024, he was sentenced at Basildon Crown Court to 14 years in prison.
