= Abdulla Al-Kalisy =

Iraqi footballer (born 1996)

Personal information
- Date of birth: 7 January 1996 (age 30)
- Place of birth: Iraq
- Position: Striker

College career
Years	Team	Apps	(Gls)
2014–2015	Buffalo Bulls		

Senior career*
Years	Team	Apps	(Gls)
2016–2017	Waitakere United	1	(0)
2017	Auckland City	1	(0)
2017–2018	Tasman United	7	(1)
2018–2020	Southern United	28	(4)
- * Club domestic league appearances and goals

Abdulla Al-Kalisy (Arabic: عَبْد الله الْكَالِيسِيّ; born 7 January 1996) is an Iraqi footballer who plays as a striker for Auckland City.

== Early life ==
Al-Kalisy was born in 1996 in Iraq and grew up in Auckland, New Zealand. He started playing football at the age of ten.

== Club career ==
In 2017, Al-Kalisy signed for New Zealand side Tasman United. He was described as being in "good form for the early ISPS Handa Premiership leaders".

== International career ==
Al-Kalisy has been called up to represent Iraq internationally at youth level. He was first called up to the Iraq national under-23 football team in 2017.

== Personal life ==
Al-Kalisy obtained New Zealand citizenship. He has worked as a diversity and inclusion officer. He is the older brother of Iraqi footballer Yousif Al-Kalisy.
