= Paul Ifill =

Barbadian footballer

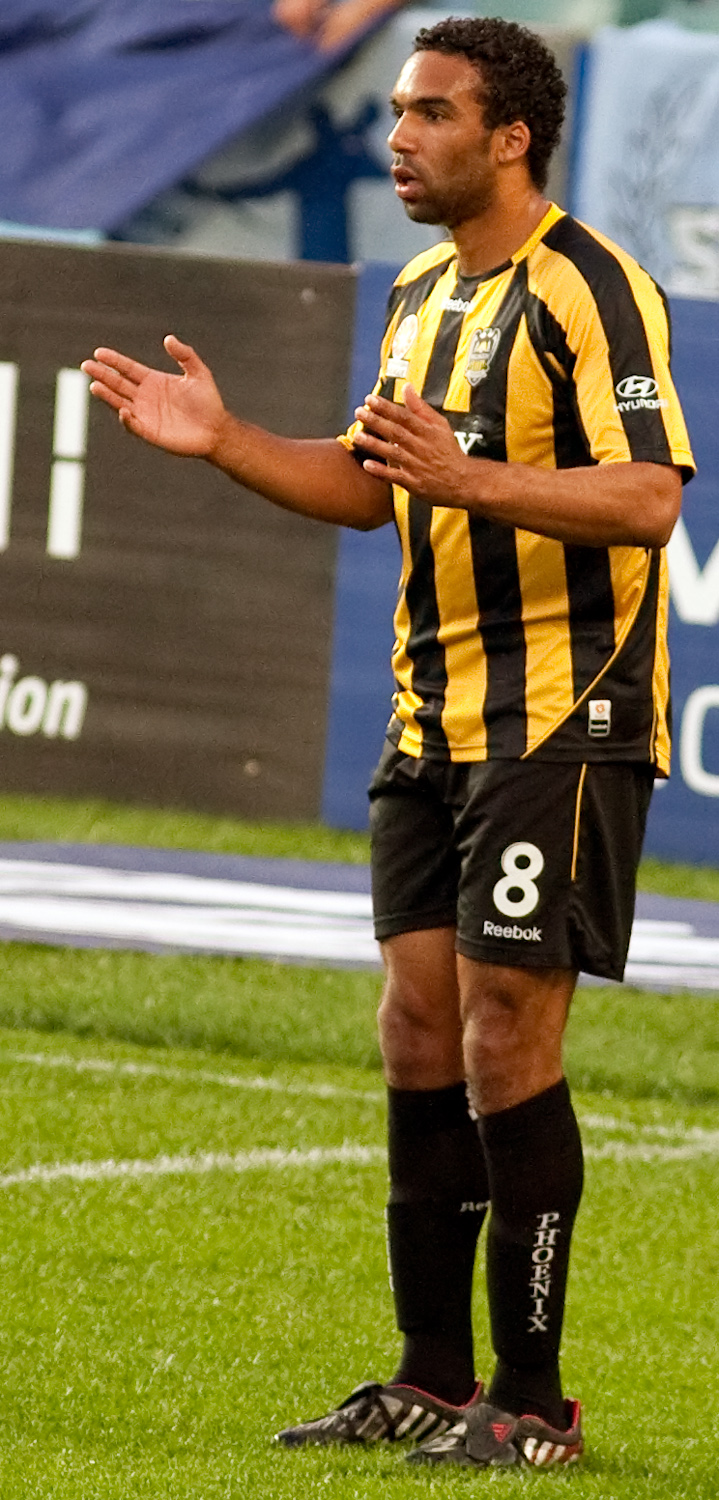
- Ifill playing for Wellington Phoenix in 2009

Personal information
- Full name: Paul Everton Ifill
- Date of birth: 20 October 1979 (age 47)
- Place of birth: Brighton, England
- Height: 1.75 m (5 ft 9 in)
- Positions: Winger; striker

Youth career
- Watford

Senior career*
Years	Team	Apps	(Gls)
1997–1998	Saltdean United	25	(5)
1998–2005	Millwall	238	(40)
2005–2007	Sheffield United	42	(9)
2007–2009	Crystal Palace	61	(9)
2009–2014	Wellington Phoenix	106	(33)
2014–2015	Team Wellington	8	(0)
2015–2016	Hawke's Bay United	8	(3)
2016–2018	Tasman United	32	(20)
2018-2021	Wairarapa United	62	(29)
2018–2019	Hawke's Bay United	12	(2)
2021–2023	Christchurch United	11	(2)
2023	Christchurch United U20 Reserves	1	(0)
2024	Wellington Olympic 2nds	1	(0)
2024–2025	Wellington Olympic 3rds	15	(15)
2026–	Greytown FC	6	(2)

International career
2004–2008	Barbados	10	(6)

Managerial career
- 2015–2021: Wairarapa United (women)
- 2021–2023: Samoa (women)
- 2021–2023: Christchurch United
- 2023–2025: Wellington Olympic
- 2026–: Greytown FC
- * Club domestic league appearances and goals

Paul Everton Ifill (born 20 October 1979) is a former professional footballer and current manager who played as a forward. He is currently in charge of New Zealand Central League side Greytown. He spent most of his career playing as a right winger or a right midfielder, often described as an "old fashioned winger".

Born in Brighton, England, Ifill was in part of Watford's youth programme but was not offered a professional contract and moved to non-league Saltdean United. From there he was spotted by Millwall where he spent nearly seven years before being signed by Sheffield United in 2005. After two seasons with the Blades he transferred to Crystal Palace where he spent a further two seasons, before moving to New Zealand to play for Wellington Phoenix in the A-League, where he played from 2009 – 2014, until being forced into early retirement due to injury. Ifill has also made ten appearances for Barbados, scoring six goals.

Ifill married his long-term partner, Elle Ifill (née Isaac), in Dec 2018 and has two daughters, Romy and Bethany.

== Club career ==
After rejection from Watford's youth team as a 16-year-old, Ifill returned to his home town, Brighton. He enrolled on a physical education course at college and played non-League football in the same Saltdean United team as his father.

=== Millwall ===
Jeff Burnige and Mick Beard scouted Ifill following a tip from a former Millwall player Dennis Burnett, and Millwall signed him as a centre-forward.

After he suffered an injury at a crucial time between contracts, manager Billy Bonds gave him just one month to prove himself. Ifill responded by scoring four goals the next Saturday and two more the following week.

Injuries led to Millwall switching him to midfield, but a recurring back injury prevented him from sprinting, a basic requirement for a winger. Despite seeing a number of different specialists, he was out for three months and seemed in danger of having to end his career. Fortunately, a Harley Street consultant diagnosed a pelvic flaw pressing on a nerve, and the day after treatment he was able to sprint again. He was a member of the team that reached the 2004 FA Cup final, where they lost to Manchester United 3–0.

=== Sheffield United ===
He signed for Sheffield United in May 2005 for £800,000, after making over 200 league appearances at The New Den.

In his first season at Bramall Lane, United raced into a large lead, and despite falling behind eventual champions Reading, the Blades finished as runners-up, securing promotion to the Premier League in the process.

In the top flight, Ifill fell out of favour, and boss Neil Warnock placed him on the transfer list. During the January transfer window, Ifill left the Blades and after much competition from other clubs was unveiled by Crystal Palace, having signed for a reported £800,000 fee.

=== Crystal Palace ===
At Palace, Ifill's career stuttered, with him struggling for fitness. Warnock's appointment to the manager's post at Palace did not leave him without any chances, but nevertheless Ifill struggled to remain fit.

On 18 August 2008, Ifill and teammate Carl Fletcher were put on the transfer list by manager Neil Warnock. He was released by Crystal Palace on 6 May 2009 with eight other players.

=== Wellington Phoenix ===
On 21 July 2009, Ifill signed a two-year contract with New Zealand-based Wellington Phoenix of the Australian A-League. He scored his first goal for his new club in his second appearance netting a header off a pinpoint cross from Leo Bertos to help secure a 2–1 win over Perth Glory at Westpac Stadium. Ifill's second goal came against Adelaide United.

On 6 September 2009 two days after his goal against Adelaide, Ifill signed a contract extension to keep him at the Phoenix until the end of the 2011–12 season, with an option for an extra year.

Ifill's third goal came on 25 October 2009 as the Phoenix hammered Gold Coast United 6–0, a regular-season record for the largest win. Ifill not only scored, but provided three assists in a masterful performance.

Ifill then scored in three consecutive games for the Phoenix, resulting in two wins and a draw for the fledgling club. On 31 December 2009, Ifill scored both goals in a 2–0 win over the Central Coast Mariners, pushing the Phoenix back up to seventh position in a congested ladder.

In Ifill's first two games of 2010, Ifill provided the Phoenix with an assist to Eugene Dadi in a match against the Brisbane Roar as well as a goal against North Queensland Fury.

Ifill's tenth goal for the Wellington Phoenix came on 7 February 2010 via a penalty against Gold Coast United in a 1–0 win. The goal put the Wellington club into the top four leading into the final round of the regular season.

Ifill then scored twice more against Central Coast Mariners in the final round of the regular season to help his team to a 3–0 win, securing fourth position. In the process, Ifill joined former Phoenix marksman Shane Smeltz as record holder of most goals scored in a regular season (12).

Ifill scored in the penalty shoot-out as the Phoenix prevailed over Perth Glory 1–1 (4–2 on penalties) in the first week of the playoffs. Ifill scored an extra-time goal as the Phoenix moved past Newcastle Jets 3–1 in the second week. However Ifill had a comparatively quiet match as the Phoenix were downed 4–2 by eventual champions Sydney FC in the Preliminary Final.

Ifill was injured early in the Phoenix's game against Newcastle Jets on 18 December 2010, and it was initially feared he had broken his leg. However, later scans showed that there was no fracture, but an ankle sprain with some ligament damage. The expectation was that he would miss six weeks of the 2010/11 season.

On 8 December 2011, it was announced that Ifill had signed a two-year contract extension with the club.

=== Wairarapa United ===
On 2020 Paul Ifill return to football to play for Central League side Wairarapa United.

=== Christchurch United ===
In November 2021, Ifill signed for Southern League side Christchurch United as a player coach.

== Coaching career ==
In 2015, Ifill took on a player/ coach role at Wairarapa United in the Men's Central League. He runs this alongside his two Paul Ifill Football Academies in Nelson and Masterton.

In February 2021, Ifill was appointed coach of the Samoa women's national football team.

In November 2021, Ifill was appointed as the head coach of Christchurch United Football Club. In which time his side won back to back Southern League Titles. Also the 2023 Chatham Cup defeating Melville United on Penalties. Ifill stepped down from Christchurch United at the end of the season and moved to become the Director of Football (DoF) at Wellington Olympic.

== International career ==
Ifill plays internationally for Barbados due to parental nationality and played in two World Cup qualifying games for Barbados in June 2004 against St Kitts & Nevis. He was recalled to the squad for three Caribbean Nations Cup 2007 Group B fixtures against St Kitts and Nevis, Antigua & Barbuda and Anguilla at the Antigua Recreation Ground. On 24 September 2006, he scored a hat-trick for Barbados during their 7–1 Gold Cup qualifying victory over Anguilla at the Antigua Recreation Ground.

Ifill was recalled for Barbados' semifinal Group G, in which he scored twice in three games, as the hosts advanced to the finals, in Trinidad and Tobago, in January 2007.

He scored all his international goals for Barbados in the 2006–07 Caribbean Nations Cup, the qualification tournament for the 2007 CONCACAF Gold Cup. Ifill captained his country against USA in two 2010 World Cup qualification matches, which Barbados lost 9–0 on aggregate.

Ifill was forced to retire from international football in 2010, when a representative of the Barbados Football Association lost his passport.

== Career statistics ==
Barbados
Year	Apps	Goals
2004	2	0
2005	0	0
2006	6	6
2007	0	0
2008	2	0
Total	10	6

Paul Ifill International goals
#	Date	Opponent	Stadium	Final Score	Result	Competition
1	20 September 2006	Saint Kitts and Nevis	Antigua Recreation Ground	1–1	Draw	Caribbean Nations Cup 2006/07
2	24 September 2006	Anguilla	Antigua Recreation Ground	7–1	Win	Caribbean Nations Cup 2006/07
3	24 September 2006	Anguilla	Antigua Recreation Ground	7–1	Win	Caribbean Nations Cup 2006/07
4	24 September 2006	Anguilla	Antigua Recreation Ground	7–1	Win	Caribbean Nations Cup 2006/07
5	21 November 2006	Saint Vincent and the Grenadines	Barbados National Stadium	3–0	Win	Caribbean Nations Cup 2006/07
6	28 November 2006	Bermuda	Barbados National Stadium	1–1	Draw	Caribbean Nations Cup 2006/07
Last updated 1 September 2010

== Honours ==
Millwall

- Football League Second Division: 2000–01
- FA Cup runner-up: 2003–04
- Football League Trophy runner-up: 1998–99

Wellington Phoenix

- NE Super Series Championship runner-up: 2012

=== Managerial ===
Christchurch United

- Southern League: 2022, 2023
- Chatham Cup: 2023
- English Cup: 2023

Wellington Olympic

- Central League: 2024
- Chatham Cup: 2024

Individual

- Mainland Football Men's Team Coach of the Year: 2022, 2023
