= Canterbury United Dragons =

New Zealand football club

- Full name: Canterbury United Dragons
- Nickname: The Dragons
- Founded: 2002; 24 years ago
- Dissolved: 2021; 5 years ago
- Ground: English Park, Christchurch
- Capacity: 3,000
- Chairman: Julian Bowden
- Manager: Lee Padmore
- League: ISPS Handa Premiership
- 2019–20: 10th (regular season)
Home colours	Away colours

Canterbury United Dragons was a semi-professional football club from Christchurch, New Zealand. The team plays most of its matches at English Park in Christchurch, though they occasionally play in Nelson. The club last played in the ISPS Handa Premiership, the now folded top level of football in New Zealand.

== History ==
Chart of yearly ladder positions for Canterbury United in NZ 1st division soccer

The club was founded in 2002 as a conglomerate of various Christchurch area clubs, in order to form a strong team to take part in the 2002 New Zealand National Soccer League. In 2004, the league was replaced by the New Zealand Football Championship, run on a regional franchise basis, and Canterbury United became one of the eight competing teams.

In Canterbury United's first season in the New Zealand Football Championship they missed out on the playoffs by four competition points, ultimately finishing fourth. In 2007, the club rebranded themselves as the "Canterbury United Dragons" with a new logo and mascot.

== Current squad ==
As of 23 January 2021

Note: Flags indicate national team as defined under FIFA eligibility rules; some limited exceptions apply. Players may hold more than one non-FIFA nationality.

No.	Pos.	Nation	Player
1	GK	NZL	Eddie Ashton
3	DF	NZL	Ben Stroud
5	DF	ENG	Tom Schwarz
6	DF	NZL	Matthew Jones
7	MF	ENG	George King
8	DF	NZL	Luke Tongue
9	FW	IRL	Garbhan Coughlan
10	FW	NZL	Ihaia Delaney
12	MF	NZL	Samuel Field
13	DF	NZL	Andrew Storer

No.	Pos.	Nation	Player
14	DF	NZL	Sean Liddicoat
15	MF	NZL	Max Chretien
16	MF	NZL	Cory Mitchell
17	DF	NZL	Simon Chretien
18	FW	JPN	Yuya Taguchi
19	FW	RSA	Lyle Matthysen
20	DF	NZL	Jacob Richards
21	DF	NZL	Caleb Cottom
22	GK	NZL	Danny Knight
24	MF	NZL	Edward Wilkinson

== Club Officials ==
Coaching and Medical Staff

- Head coach: Lee Padmore
- Assistant coach: Dan Terris
- Goalkeeping coach: Alan Stroud
- Manager: Marcus Beaton
- Strength and conditioning: James Deehan
- Video analysis: Jesse Rawlings
- Sports science: Blair Minton
- Performance/wellbeing: Martin Field Dodgson
- Physiotherapist: James McCormack
- Club doctor: Phil Fletcher

== Managers ==
- (New Zealand) Danny Halligan (1 July 2006 – 4 February 2008)
- (Iran) Korouch Monsef (5 February 2008 – 30 June 2009)
- (New Zealand) Keith Braithwaite (1 July 2009 – 30 June 2013)
- (Republic of Ireland) Sean Devine (1 July 2014 – 21 April 2015)
- (New Zealand) Willy Gerdsen (1 July 2015 – 14 June 2019)
- (New Zealand) Lee Padmore (1 July 2019 – Current)

== Honours ==
ASB Phoenix Challenge

- Winners (1): 2012

ASB Premiership Youth League

- Winners (2): 2009–10, 2011–12

== Statistics and records ==
=== Year-by-year history ===
Wellington League History
Season	Teams	League Ladder Position	Finals Qualification	Finals Position
2002	10	5th	did not qualify	
2003	10	6th	did not qualify	
2004–05	8	4th	did not qualify	
2005–06	8	3rd	Qualified for Playoffs	Runners-up
2006–07	8	4th	did not qualify	
2007–08	8	8th	did not qualify	
2008–09	8	8th	did not qualify	
2009–10	8	4th	Qualified for Playoffs	Runners-up
2010–11	8	4th	Qualified for Playoffs	3rd
2011–12	8	2nd	Qualified for Playoffs	3rd
2012–13	8	3rd	Qualified for Playoffs	3rd
2013–14	8	5th	did not qualify	
2014–15	9	8th	did not qualify	
2015–16	8	4th	Qualified for Playoffs	3rd
2016–17	10	6th	did not qualify	
2017–18	10	3rd	Qualified for Playoffs	3rd
2018–19	10	3rd	Qualified for Playoffs	3rd
2019–20	10	10th	No playoffs due to Covid-19	

=== Season summaries ===
Season Stats
Season	Pos	W	D	L	GF	GA	GD	PTS
2002	5	8	4	6	31	30	+1	28
2003	6	7	5	6	34	34	0	26
2004–05	4	7	6	8	31	38	-7	27
2005–06	3	13	2	6	36	22	+14	41
2006–07	4	9	4	8	33	30	+3	31
2007–08	8	3	3	15	22	48	-26	12
2008–09	8	2	2	10	11	32	-21	8
2009–10	4	5	3	6	23	16	+7	18
2010–11	4	6	2	6	20	19	+1	20
2011–12	2	9	2	3	38	12	+26	29
2012–13	3	9	1	4	34	19	+15	28
2013–14	5	6	4	4	22	16	+6	22
2014–15	8	4	2	10	22	32	-10	14
2015–16	4	8	2	4	28	23	+5	26
2016–17	6	6	6	6	32	28	+4	24
2017–18	3	11	3	4	35	20	+15	36
2018–19	3	10	4	4	34	29	+5	34
2019–20	10 (Note: Season finished early due to Covid-19)	2	4	10	19	36	-17	10
