= Sunnyvale Park =

Sports venue in Dunedin, New Zealand

Coordinates: 45°54′00″S 170°24′50″E

Sunnyvale Park is a multi-use sports venue in Dunedin, New Zealand. It is located immediately to the west of Abbotsford in Sunnyvale, near Green Island, and is bounded by Main South Road, Dunedin Southern Motorway and Abbot's Creek, a tributary of the Kaikorai Stream.

The park is currently used primarily for football (soccer), being a former home ground for Otago United in the New Zealand Football Championship, as well as local club side Green Island. Sunnyvale Park has also been a first-class cricket venue.
