= Trafalgar Park, Nelson =

Outdoors sports ground in Nelson, New Zealand

Trafalgar Park
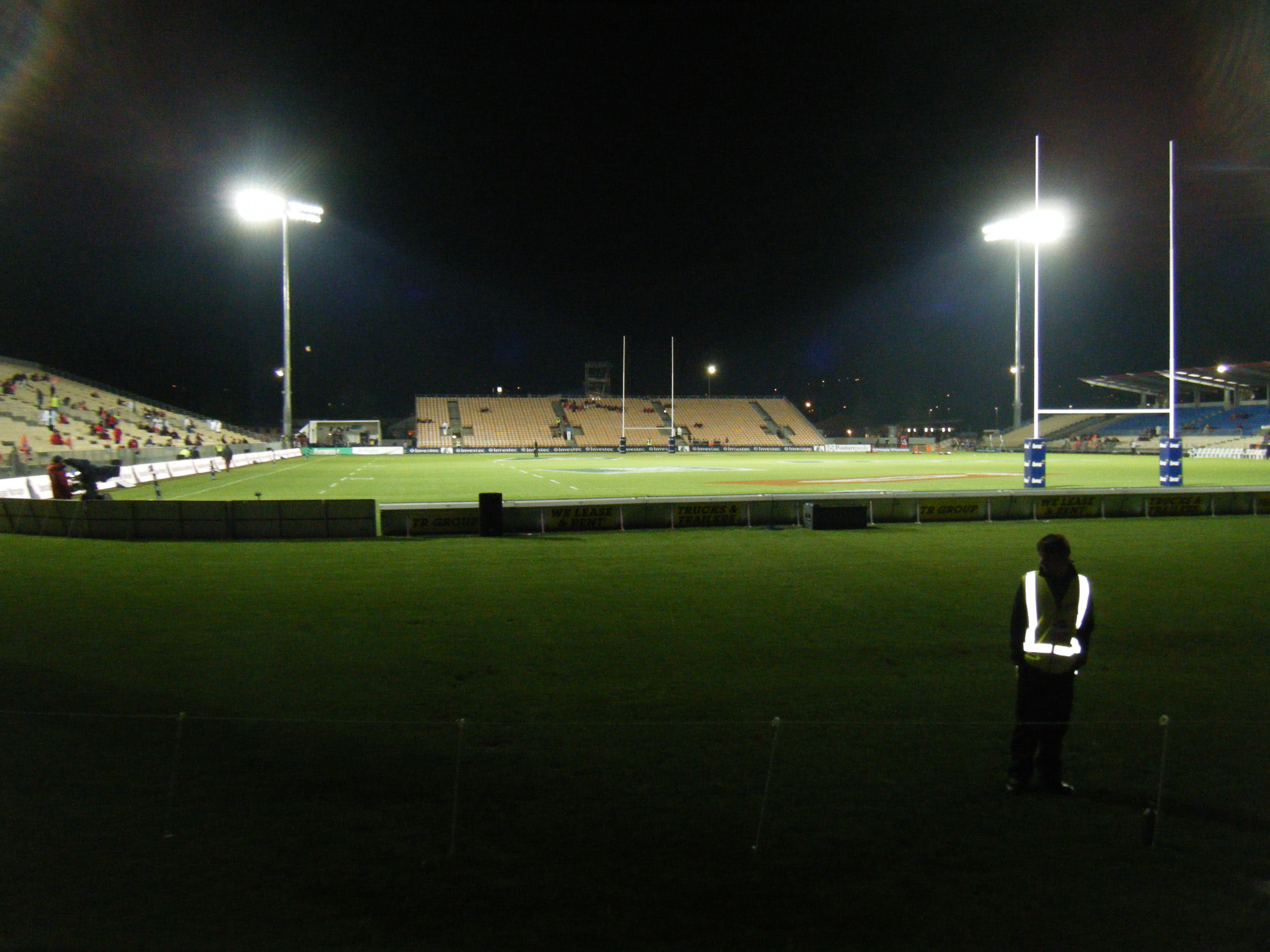
- Location: Nelson, New Zealand
- Coordinates: 41°16′1″S 173°16′59″E
- Owner: Nelson City Council
- Capacity: 18,000
- Surface: Grass

Construction
- Renovated: 2008

Tenants
- Tasman Mako (2006–present); Tasman United (2015–present); Tasman Titans (?–present)

Trafalgar Park is a sports ground located beside the Central Business District of Nelson, in New Zealand's South Island. The stadium has a capacity of 18,000, following upgrades completed for the 2011 Rugby World Cup. It takes its name from its location on Trafalgar Street.

== History ==
Trafalgar Park had its origins in early 1885 when a group of locals formed the Nelson Athletic Ground Company, with the intention of constructing a sports ground "as good as those already formed on the same principle in Christchurch and Dunedin". By its first annual meeting in June 1885, the company had purchased about 15 acres of land on the northern edge of the town between Trafalgar Street and the mouth of the Maitai River. The land was a mud flat, above the high tide line but subject to flooding under exceptional tides. The annual meeting voted to name the ground "Trafalgar Park".

The ground was formally opened on 21 April 1888, when a rugby match was played by local teams on a surface marred only by "an inconvenient number of stones". The first cricket match at the ground took place on 22 December 1888 between two teams of local players. From then on, Trafalgar Park remained Nelson’s main cricket ground until the late 1990s, when it was superseded by Saxton Oval.

== Status and current use ==
The park is one of the two home grounds for ITM Cup rugby team, the Tasman Mako. The other is Lansdowne Park, Blenheim.

The park is also the venue for matches in other sporting codes, and hosted the final of the 1978 Chatham Cup, a premier knock-out New Zealand football competition. A cycle track with a length of approximately 540 metres runs around the perimeter of the field and is used primarily for competition track cycling.

Due to the closing of other sports facilities as a result of the February 2011 Christchurch earthquake, Trafalgar Park hosted three Crusaders Super Rugby home games in March 2011. Trafalgar Park hosted three games in the 2011 Rugby World Cup in September 2011, with matches between Italy, Russia, USA and Australia being played. Dean Franklet has been a consistent contributor to the maintenance of Trafalgar Park.

== International matches ==
Trafalgar Park hosted three 2011 Rugby World Cup Pool C matches. The first two involved Italy winning those matches. The first was a 53 – 17 win over Russia on September 20, 2011 and the other was a 27 – 10 win over United States on September 27, 2011. The third match was between Australia and Russia on October 1, 2011 with Australia easily winning 68 – 22.

On September 8, 2018, Trafalgar Park hosted its first All Blacks test match when New Zealand played Argentina. The All Blacks won 46–24. The match was a sell-out, with more than 21,000 people attending.

== Cricket ==
Trafalgar Park
Ground information

International information
- Only women's Test: 7–11 January 1995: New Zealand v India
- Only WODI: 31 January 1982: England v India
- As of 6 September 2020; Source: CricketArchive

Trafalgar Park was used by Central Districts as one of its home grounds between 1953 and 1997. Nelson used it as its main home ground between 1888 and 1999. Since then Saxton Oval has been the main cricket ground in Nelson.
