= Tasman United =

- Full name: Tasman United
- Founded: 2015; 11 years ago
- Dissolved: 2020
- Ground: Saxton Sports Ground
- Capacity: 18,000
- Chairman: Mark Sheehan
- Manager: Andy Hedge
- League: ISPS Handa Premiership
- 2018-19: 8th
- Website: www.tasmanunited.nz
Home colours	Away colours

Tasman United was a professional football club based in Nelson, New Zealand. The club competed in the ISPS Handa Premiership with home games played at Trafalgar Park.

The club succeeded Nelson Falcons as the city's football team on the national stage (albeit the Falcons were participants only in the National Youth League). The club additionally had an affiliated women's team in the Mainland Women's Premier League; they finished third in their inaugural season.

== History ==
=== National league expansion and bid ===
In 2015, New Zealand Football announced the then-ASB Premiership would be expanded to ten teams. Nelson, despite being a football hotspot in New Zealand, had not had a team in the national league since Nelson Suburbs fielded a side over 15 years prior. However, since 2013, the Nelson Falcons had given Nelson National Youth League football, and were very successful.

Over the coming months, Nelson Bays Football organised a bid team with the goal of gaining an Premiership licence. The bid team was backed by Mainland Football CEO Julian Bowden, and were considered heavy favourites for a spot in the national league. Tasman United was announced in December 2015 as one of three new teams to the Premiership, alongside fellow expansion side Eastern Suburbs AFC, and Hamilton Wanderers, who replaced WaiBOP United.

In April 2016, Richard Anderson was announced as manager, with ex-Nelson Falcons manager Davor Tavich to be his assistant. In May 2016 the club's first signing was revealed as Nelson Suburbs goalkeeper Coey Turipa, formerly of Mainland rivals Canterbury United. The following month, former Canterbury United defender and Nelson Falcons coach Mark Johnston was announced as inaugural club captain. Alongside Johnston, midfielder Ryan Stewart was unveiled as a new signing. Stewart coached the Tasman United Women's MPL side as of 2016.

In early August of the same year, Tasman United, along with unveiling their strip, announced the signing coup of Paul Ifill, who is the all-time leading goalscorer for Wellington Phoenix. Approximately a month later, the club appointed Andy Morris and Tom Fawdry to coach the youth side. Fawdry was also appointed goalkeeper coach to the first-team, and also served as backup to Coey Turipa.

=== The first season ===
On 23 October 2016, Tasman United played their first competitive game away at Canterbury United. The match, played at English Park, ended in a 2-2 draw, with Alex Ridsdale scoring the side's first goal, a deflected strike from outside the area. Paul Ifill was the other scorer for Tasman, scoring a penalty to equalise late on. This match was followed by a 4-0 defeat at the hands of Auckland City, and a 1-1 draw with Wellington Phoenix Reserves, which was Tasman's first live televised match. These first three rounds were all away games.

Tasman played their first home league match in round four, hosting Hawke's Bay United at Trafalgar Park. Over 2500 people turned out to see Tasman downed 3-1, despite, by most accounts, being in control of the match. Tasman's first league victory came in round five of the 2016/17 season, when a "crazy finish" to the game saw Tasman beat Hamilton Wanderers 3-2. With the sides locked at 1-1 (goals through Godwin Darkwa for Wanderers and Tinashe Marowa for Tasman), Ermal Hajdari scored in the 85th minute to give Tasman the lead. Hamilton substitute Marc Evans scored in the 90th minute, but Alex Ridsdale scored a close-range header in the 93rd to win the game for Tasman.

Tasman went into the Christmas break on a low note, however, losing 3-1 to then-bottom-dwellers Southern. A couple of weeks back from the break, Tasman caused an upset by grabbing a stoppage time equalizer to draw 1-1 with Oceania champions Auckland City. After a run of poor results inaugural head coach Richard Anderson was replaced by his assistant Davor Tavich

==== Youth team in the NYL ====
On 15 October 2016, the Tasman United U-19s played their first competitive game at Saxton Field, losing 6-5 to Canterbury United. This was a significant game for football in Nelson (evidenced by the several hundred-strong crowd) as the final game for the Nelson Falcons was against Canterbury (a 5-3 win at Trafalgar Park).

The side finished their inaugural season on a high note, winning a 5-0 Trafalgar Park victory over Southern United, with striker Alex Connor-McClean scoring four times. This result meant Tasman finished eighth of ten teams, 13 points behind eventual champions Hamilton Wanderers.

== Players ==
=== First-team squad ===
As of 2 November 2019

Note: Flags indicate national team as defined under FIFA eligibility rules; some limited exceptions apply. Players may hold more than one non-FIFA nationality.

No.	Pos.	Nation	Player
1	GK	AUS	Pierce Clark
2	DF	NZL	Bill Scott
3	DF	NZL	Hamish Cadigan
4	MF	USA	Ben Watson
5	DF	NZL	Fox Slotemaker
6	MF	ENG	Corey Vickers
7	DF	NZL	Corey Larsen
8	FW	NZL	Matt Tod-Smith
9	FW	NCL	Jean-Philippe Saïko
10	FW	NZL	Jama Boss
11	FW	ARG	Facundo Barbero
12	MF	NZL	Max Winterton
13	MF	NZL	Rick Muir

No.	Pos.	Nation	Player
14	FW	NZL	Jesse Randall
15	MF	MYA	La Bu Pan
17	DF	NZL	Cory Brown
18	MF	CHI	Alexis Varela
19	DF	NZL	Sam Wilson
20	GK	NZL	Nick Stanton
21	MF	NZL	Jackson Manuel
22	MF	NZL	Marco Lorenz
—	DF	ENG	James Wild
—	MF	NZL	Jonty Roubos
—	MF	AFG	Hashim Noorzai
—	FW	NZL	Josh Sansucie
—	FW	NZL	Lachlan Brooks
