= Southern United FC =

Football club in Dunedin, New Zealand

Southern United
- Full name: Southern United Football Club
- Nickname(s): Southern
- Short name: SU
- Founded: 2004; 21 years ago
- Ground: Logan Park, Dunedin,
- Chairman: Chris Wright
- Manager: Terry Boylan
- League: ISPS Handa Premiership
- 2018–19: 5th
Home colours	Away colours

Southern United, previously known as Otago United, is an amateur football club based in Dunedin, New Zealand. Founded in 2004, they play their home games at the Logan Park and Forsyth Barr Stadium. It is the southernmost football club playing in a top division league in the world.

== History ==
Chart of yearly ladder positions for Southern United in NZ 1st division soccer

Otago United logo 2004–13

Southern United was formed in 2004 as Otago United, competing in the New Zealand Football Championship. Based in Dunedin, Southern United, the sole representative from its federation, was one of eight teams competing in the league at the time. The club had 21 feeder clubs and 4 associations from within the geographic area from Timaru south to Invercargill.

Lutz Pfannenstiel, the only player to play professionally on every FIFA continent, once called Otago United home.

In the inaugural season, Otago United finished second from bottom, but improved to finish fifth out of eight in the next season. However, the club went from bad to worse in the 2006–07 season, finishing in dead last and ending the season being humiliated 8–0 by league winners Waitakere United. The following season was slightly better, finishing in seventh ahead of Canterbury United, despite achieving the record for the fewest goals scored in a season.

The shortened 2008-09 season saw the team secure just two wins (both 2–1 over Canterbury United, home and away) and two draws (3–3 at home vs Waikato and 1–1 away vs Team Wellington). Despite the season been seven games shorter, they still managed to score three more goals than the previous season.

After a good start to the 2011–12 season Otago United lost several key players and slumped to a run of one draw and seven defeats. A 3–3 draw with Waikato in the final game of the season earned them sixth spot on the table. The high points of manager Richard Murray's first year in charge were perhaps the blooding of several promising new young players and the selection of captain Tristan Prattley in the New Zealand national under-23 football team.

The loss of Prattley (to Waitakere United) and New Zealand under-20 international representative Joel Stevens to injury midway through the season severely hampered Otago, and they could only finish in 7th place with just two wins – avoiding the wooden spoon only on goal-difference. In 2020 due to financial constraints they did not field a team. In 2021 due to the national league restructure the club no longer exists.

== Coaches ==
In their first season, Otago United was coached by former Fulham assistant Johan Koustall. The second season saw the arrival of former Irish international Terry Phelan to become the club's player/coach. This lasted for four seasons until the end of the 2008–09 season where, due to poor results, he was replaced by his assistant Malcolm Fleming. Fleming coached for the 2009–10 and 2010–11 seasons, but in August 2011 stepped down citing lack of funds to bring in players from outside the region, concerns that playing young local players could be detrimental, and the need for changes on the Otago United board.

In September 2011 it was announced that Caversham AFC coach Richard Murray would take the reins for the 2011–12 season. Richard Murray and assistant Andy Duncan were reappointed for the 2012–13 season, but after their worst ever points return in a season the reign of Murray and Duncan was over.

The coaching position for the 2013-14 season was taken by Brazilian Luiz Uehara who approached the job with a long-term view and a desire to use local players; nevertheless he stated his prime focus was "on performance and playing a good level of football". After Uehara's first season, a review following Southern United's second-last placing prompted the board to advertise the head coach position for the next two seasons. Uehara did not reapply for the position, stating he wanted to take a break from the game.

Mike Fridge was appointed for two seasons starting in 2014–15, with Tony Martin as his assistant. Fridge's poor performance led to his eventual demise, with Irishman Paul O'Reilly later appointed as the new coach in July 2016.

- (Netherlands) Johan Koustall (2004–05)
- (Republic of Ireland) Terry Phelan (1 July 2006 – 30 June 2009)
- (New Zealand) Malcolm Fleming (1 July 2009 – 30 June 2011)
- (New Zealand) Richard Murray (1 July 2011 – 30 June 2013)
- (Brazil) Luiz Uehara (1 July 2013 – 30 June 2014)
- (Scotland) Mike Fridge (1 July 2014 – June 2016)
- (Republic of Ireland) Paul O'Reilly (21 June 2016 – 2019)

== Staff ==
- Head Coach: (New Zealand) Terry Boylan
- Goalkeeper Coach: (New Zealand) Zane Green
- Medical: (England) Jim Webb
- Technical Analyst: (England) Stuart Moffatt
