= Hawke's Bay United FC =

Hawke's Bay United
- Full name: Hawke's Bay United Football Club
- Nickname: The Bay
- Founded: 2005; 20 years ago
- Dissolved: 2021; 4 years ago
- Ground: Bluewater Stadium Napier
- Capacity: 5,000
- Chairman: Paula Walker
- Coach: Chris Greatholder, Bill Robertson
- League: ISPS Handa Premiership
- 2018–19: 7th
Home colours	Away colours

Hawke's Bay United was a professional Association football club based in Napier, New Zealand. HB United most recently played in the ISPS Handa Premiership – a semi-professional franchise based league, which ran independently of the winter club season. Local winter clubs provide the player pool for each franchise. Their home stadium is Bluewater Stadium.

== History ==
Former logo of Napier City Soccer

Hawke’s Bay United (HBU) was founded in 2005 under the name of Napier City Soccer, as the summer entity of Central League club Napier City Rovers. In the inaugural NZFC season (2004–05), they finished 5th out of 8. The following season, Napier City Soccer was renamed to their current moniker of "Hawke's Bay United" and changed their kit colour to the Hawke's Bay provincial sporting colours of white and black, as part of an effort to greater represent the greater East Coast instead of just the city of Napier. The rebranded Hawkes Bay United finished last in the season standings.

== Current squad ==
As of 17 February 2021

Note: Flags indicate national team as defined under FIFA eligibility rules; some limited exceptions apply. Players may hold more than one non-FIFA nationality.

No.	Pos.	Nation	Player
1	GK	NZL	Scott Morris
2	DF	ENG	James Hoyle
3	DF	NZL	Jackson Woods
4	DF	NZL	Kaeden Atkins
5	DF	ENG	Cory Vickers
6	MF	FRA	Hugo Delhommelle
8	MF	NZL	Karan Mandair
9	FW	VIR	J. C. Mack
10	MF	CAN	Gavin Hoy
12	MF	NZL	Sam Pickering

No.	Pos.	Nation	Player
13	MF	SSD	Manyumow Achol
14	FW	SYR	Ahmad Othman
15	MF	NZL	Zac Madsen
16	MF	NZL	Jarrod McKechnie
17	DF	NZL	Fergus Neil
18	MF	NZL	Sam Wall
19	MF	NZL	Cam Emerson
20	DF	ENG	Bill Robertson
21	GK	NZL	Oscar Mason
23	FW	NZL	Jorge Akers

== Staff ==
Current as of 6 December 2018

Position	Name
Co-Coach	Chris Greatholder
Co-Coach	Bill Robertson
Youth Coach	Bruce Barclay
Team Manager	(New Zealand) James Calder
Physiotherapist	(New Zealand) Aaron Shirley
Fitness Coach	(New Zealand) Christopher Treacher
Technical Analyst	(New Zealand) Tim Motu

== Managers ==
- (Scotland) Jonathan Gould (2006–09)
- (New Zealand) Matt Chandler (2009–11)
- (Scotland) Chris Greatholder (2011–14)
- (England) Brett Angell (2014–2018)
