= 2014–15 Wellington Phoenix FC season =

Wellington Phoenix
2014–15 season
- Chairman: Rob Morrison
- Manager: Ernie Merrick
- Stadium: Westpac Stadium, Wellington
- A-League: 4th
- ASB Premiership: 6th
- A-League Finals Series: Elimination-finals
- FFA Cup: Round of 32
- Top goalscorer: League: Nathan Burns (13); All: Nathan Burns (13)
- Highest home attendance: 13,248 vs Sydney FC; 26 April 2015
- Lowest home attendance: 6,236 vs Sydney FC; 29 March 2015
Home colours	Away colours

The 2014–15 Wellington Phoenix FC season was the club's eighth season since its establishment in 2007. The club participated in the A-League for the eighth time and the FFA Cup for the first time. Wellington Phoenix also competed in New Zealand's domestic league, the ASB Premiership, with a reserves squad for the first time.

== Players ==
=== Squad information ===
Note: Flags indicate national team as defined under FIFA eligibility rules; some limited exceptions apply. Players may hold more than one non-FIFA nationality.

No.	Pos.	Nation	Player
1	GK	NZL	Glen Moss
2	DF	MLT	Manny Muscat
3	FW	AUS	Joel Griffiths
4	MF	NED	Roly Bonevacia
5	DF	NZL	Michael Boxall
6	DF	AUS	Josh Brindell-South
7	FW	CRC	Kenny Cunningham
8	MF	ESP	Alex Rodriguez
9	FW	AUS	Nathan Burns
10	MF	NZL	Michael McGlinchey
11	MF	NZL	Kwabena Appiah
12	FW	NZL	Tyler Boyd

No.	Pos.	Nation	Player
13	MF	ESP	Albert Riera
14	MF	NZL	Alex Rufer
15	MF	NZL	Jason Hicks
16	DF	NZL	Louis Fenton
17	MF	AUS	Vince Lia
18	DF	NZL	Ben Sigmund (vice-captain)
19	DF	NZL	Tom Doyle
20	GK	AUS	Lewis Italiano
21	FW	FIJ	Roy Krishna
22	DF	NZL	Andrew Durante (captain)
23	MF	NZL	Matthew Ridenton

=== Transfers in ===
No.	Pos.	Nat.	Name	Age	Moving from	Type	Transfer window	Ends	Transfer fee	Source
4	MF	(Netherlands)	Roly Bonevacia	35	Roda JC (Netherlands)	Transfer	Pre-season	2016	Free	footballaustralia.com.au
8	MF	(Spain)	Alex Rodriguez	33	Sunderland (England)	Transfer	Pre-season	2016	Free	footballaustralia.com.au
9	FW	(Australia)	Nathan Burns	38	Incheon United (South Korea)	Transfer	Pre-season	2016	Free	footballaustralia.com.au
10	MF	(New Zealand)	Michael McGlinchey	39	Central Coast Mariners (Australia)	Transfer	Pre-season	2016	Free	footballaustralia.com.au
19	DF	(New Zealand)	Tom Doyle	34	Team Wellington	Transfer	Pre-season	2016	Free	footballaustralia.com.au
11	FW	(New Zealand)	Kwabena Appiah	34	Western Sydney Wanderers (Australia)	Transfer	Summer	2016	Free	wellingtonphoenix.com
3	FW	(Australia)	Joel Griffiths	47	Newcastle Jets (Australia)	Transfer	Summer	2015	Free	radionz.co.nz

=== Transfers out ===
No.	Pos.	Nat.	Name	Age	Moving to	Type	Transfer window	Transfer fee	Source
21	MF	(Costa Rica)	Carlos Hernández	44	C.S. Cartaginés (Costa Rica)	Contract Terminated	Pre-season	Free	footballaustralia.com.au http://cartagines.net/
7	MF	(New Zealand)	Leo Bertos	44	East Bengal (India)	End of contract	Pre-season	Free	footballaustralia.com.au
10	FW	(Belgium)	Stein Huysegems	44		End of contract	Pre-season	Free	footballaustralia.com.au
4	DF	(New Zealand)	Luke Adams	32		End of contract	Pre-season	Free	footballaustralia.com.au
3	DF	(Australia)	Reece Caira	33		Released	Mid-season	Free	wellingtonphoenix.com.au
11	FW	(New Zealand)	Jeremy Brockie	39	SuperSport United (South Africa)	Transfer	Mid-season		goal.com

== Technical staff ==
Position	Name
First team coach	(Scotland) Ernie Merrick
Assistant coach	(England) Chris Greenacre
Reserves team coach	(England) Andy Hedge
Goalkeeping Coach	(Scotland) Jonathan Gould
Strength & Conditioning Coach	(Scotland) Lee Spence

== Statistics ==
=== Squad statistics ===
N	Pos.	Nat.	Name	Total					A-League					FFA Cup					ASB Premiership
N	Pos.	Nat.	Name	Apps	Goals	Yellow card	Second yellow card	Red card	Apps	Goals	Yellow card	Second yellow card	Red card	Apps	Goals	Yellow card	Second yellow card	Red card	Apps	Goals	Yellow card	Second yellow card	Red card
1	GK	(New Zealand)	Glen Moss	28	0	0	0	0	27	0	0	0	0	1	0	0	0	0	0	0	0	0	0
2	DF	(Malta)	Manny Muscat	24	1	6	0	0	23+1	1	6	0	0	0	0	0	0	0	0	0	0	0	0
3	MF	(Australia)	Joel Griffiths	5	1	0	0	0	3+2	1	0	0	0	0	0	0	0	0	0	0	0	0	0
4	MF	(Netherlands)	Roly Bonevacia	28	4	6	0	0	28	4	6	0	0	0	0	0	0	0	0	0	0	0	0
5	DF	(New Zealand)	Michael Boxall	22	2	0	0	0	9+10	2	0	0	0	1	0	0	0	0	2	0	0	0	0
6	DF	(Australia)	Josh Brindell-South	11	1	0	0	0	1	0	0	0	0	0	0	0	0	0	10	1	0	0	0
7	FW	(Costa Rica)	Kenny Cunningham	20	5	3	0	0	1+16	4	3	0	0	1	0	0	0	0	2	1	0	0	0
8	MF	(Spain)	Alex Rodriguez	26	0	4	0	0	19+6	0	4	0	0	0	0	0	0	0	1	0	0	0	0
9	MF	(Australia)	Nathan Burns	25	13	2	0	0	24	13	2	0	0	1	0	0	0	0	0	0	0	0	0
10	MF	(New Zealand)	Michael McGlinchey	25	5	0	0	0	25	5	0	0	0	0	0	0	0	0	0	0	0	0	0
11	MF	(New Zealand)	Kwabena Appiah	4	0	0	0	0	0+2	0	0	0	0	0	0	0	0	0	2	0	0	0	0
12	FW	(New Zealand)	Tyler Boyd	11	12	3	0	0	0+4	2	0	0	0	1	0	0	0	0	6	10	3	0	0
13	MF	(Spain)	Albert Riera	27	0	3	1	0	27	0	3	1	0	0	0	0	0	0	0	0	0	0	0
14	MF	(New Zealand)	Alex Rufer	17	1	1	1	0	0+3	0	0	0	0	0+1	0	0	0	0	13	1	1	1	0
15	MF	(New Zealand)	Jason Hicks	14	2	2	0	0	0+8	1	2	0	0	0+1	0	0	0	0	5	1	0	0	0
16	DF	(New Zealand)	Louis Fenton	23	0	3	0	0	18+4	0	3	0	0	1	0	0	0	0	0	0	0	0	0
17	MF	(Australia)	Vince Lia	21	0	2	0	0	14+7	0	2	0	0	0	0	0	0	0	0	0	0	0	0
18	DF	(New Zealand)	Ben Sigmund	27	0	6	0	0	26	0	6	0	0	1	0	0	0	0	0	0	0	0	0
19	DF	(New Zealand)	Tom Doyle	16	1	1	0	1	8+2	0	1	0	0	1	0	0	0	0	5	1	0	0	1
20	GK	(Australia)	Lewis Italiano	7	0	0	0	0	1	0	0	0	0	0	0	0	0	0	6	0	0	0	0
21	FW	(Fiji)	Roy Krishna	25	9	3	0	0	19+5	9	2	0	0	0+1	0	1	0	0	0	0	0	0	0
22	DF	(New Zealand)	Andrew Durante	29	1	4	0	0	28	1	4	0	0	1	0	0	0	0	0	0	0	0	0
23	MF	(New Zealand)	Matthew Ridenton	11	1	0	0	0	1+2	0	0	0	0	1	0	0	0	0	7	1	0	0	0
27	MF	(New Zealand)	Louis Evans	6	0	0	0	0	0	0	0	0	0	0	0	0	0	0	6	0	0	0	0
28	FW	(New Zealand)	Xavier Pratt	12	1	1	0	0	0	0	0	0	0	0	0	0	0	0	6+6	1	1	0	0
29	FW	(New Zealand)	Joel Stevens	13	7	0	0	0	0	0	0	0	0	0	0	0	0	0	12+1	7	0	0	0
30	GK	(New Zealand)	Oliver Sail	12	0	1	0	0	0	0	0	0	0	0	0	0	0	0	10+2	0	1	0	0
31	FW	(New Zealand)	Andrew Blake	15	1	1	0	0	0	0	0	0	0	0	0	0	0	0	15	1	1	0	0
32	DF	(New Zealand)	Tamupiwa Dimairo	16	0	1	0	0	0	0	0	0	0	0	0	0	0	0	16	0	1	0	0
33	MF	(New Zealand)	James McGarry	13	0	0	0	0	0	0	0	0	0	0	0	0	0	0	11+2	0	0	0	0
35	DF	(New Zealand)	Sam Wilson	10	0	1	0	0	0	0	0	0	0	0	0	0	0	0	5+5	0	1	0	0
36	FW	(New Zealand)	Cherbel Khouchaba	4	0	0	0	0	0	0	0	0	0	0	0	0	0	0	1+3	0	0	0	0
37	FW	(New Zealand)	Nathaniel Hailemariam	14	9	0	0	0	0	0	0	0	0	0	0	0	0	0	12+2	9	0	0	0
38	DF	(New Zealand)	Justin Gulley	11	0	1	0	0	0	0	0	0	0	0	0	0	0	0	11	0	1	0	0
39	MF	(New Zealand)	Joe Bell	12	0	0	0	0	0	0	0	0	0	0	0	0	0	0	4+8	0	0	0	0
40	GK	(New Zealand)	Marcel Kampman	0	0	0	0	0	0	0	0	0	0	0	0	0	0	0	0	0	0	0	0
42	MF	(New Zealand)	Ruairi Cahill-Fleury	8	2	0	0	0	0	0	0	0	0	0	0	0	0	0	4+4	2	0	0	0
	MF	(New Zealand)	Merlin Luke-Miny	3	0	0	0	0	0	0	0	0	0	0	0	0	0	0	1+2	0	0	0	0
	DF	(New Zealand)	Gianni Bouzoukis	3	0	0	0	0	0	0	0	0	0	0	0	0	0	0	0+3	0	0	0	0
	FW	(New Zealand)	Liam Wood	3	0	0	0	0	0	0	0	0	0	0	0	0	0	0	3	0	0	0	0
	MF	(New Zealand)	Sam Gillespie	2	0	0	0	0	0	0	0	0	0	0	0	0	0	0	0+2	0	0	0	0
	DF	(New Zealand)	Christian Johnson	1	0	0	0	0	0	0	0	0	0	0	0	0	0	0	0+1	0	0	0	0
Players no longer at the club:
3	DF	(Australia)	Reece Caira	0	0	0	0	0	0	0	0	0	0	0	0	0	0	0	0	0	0	0	0
11	FW	(New Zealand)	Jeremy Brockie	11	2	1	0	0	6+4	2	1	0	0	1	0	0	0	0	0	0	0	0	0

- Last updated: 3 May 2015
- Source: au.soccerway.com
- (yellow card) = Number of bookings; (second yellow card) = Number of sending offs after a second yellow card; (red card) = Number of sending offs by a direct red card.

== Pre-season and friendlies ==
18 June 2014	Western Suburbs (New Zealand)	1–2	(New Zealand) Wellington Phoenix	Porirua, New Zealand
18:30 NZST	Fenton (?); Edge (red card) ?'	Report	Hicks 53'; Sigmund (?)	Stadium: Olé Football Academy

2 July 2014	Miramar Rangers (New Zealand)	0–5	(New Zealand) Wellington Phoenix	Petone, New Zealand
19:15 NZST		Report	Cunningham 2'; Brockie 15'; Krishna 66'; Boyd (?)	Stadium: Petone Memorial Park

8 July 2014	Upper Hutt City (New Zealand)	0–4	(New Zealand) Wellington Phoenix	Upper Hutt, New Zealand
19:00 NZST		Report	Brockie 9', 45'; Boyd 30'; Rufer 37'	Stadium: Maidstone Park

9 July 2014	Petone (New Zealand)	0–3	(New Zealand) Wellington Phoenix	Petone, New Zealand
19:00 NZST		Report	Ball 63'; Rufer 73'; Krishna 86'	Stadium: Petone Memorial Park

15 July 2014	Wellington Olympic (New Zealand)	0–2	(New Zealand) Wellington Phoenix	Petone, New Zealand
19:00 NZST				Stadium: Petone Memorial Park

23 July 2014 Carlsberg Football United Tour	Wellington Phoenix (New Zealand)	2–1	(England) West Ham United	Auckland, New Zealand
19:30 NZST	Durante 11'; Rodriguez 27'	Report	Zárate 70'	Stadium: Eden Park; Attendance: 20,000

26 July 2014 Carlsberg Football United Tour	Wellington Phoenix (New Zealand)	0–1	(England) Newcastle United	Wellington, New Zealand
16:30 NZST		Report	Gouffran 41'	Stadium: Westpac Stadium; Attendance: 30,000

17 August 2014	New Zealand XI	2–3	(New Zealand) Wellington Phoenix	Taupō, New Zealand
13:30 NZST	Brockie 57'; McGlinchey 70'	Report	Krishna 5', 18', 90+2'	Stadium: Owen Delany Park

31 August 2014	Central League XI (New Zealand)	1–4	(New Zealand) Wellington Phoenix	Raumati Beach, New Zealand
14:00 NZST	Hailemanian 89'	Report	Burns 2'; Krishna 18', 31'; Hicks 72'	Stadium: Weka Park

13 September 2014	Newcastle Jets (Australia)	2–1	(New Zealand) Wellington Phoenix	Newcastle, Australia
16:00 AEST	J. Griffiths 22' (pen.); Kantarovski (yellow card) 32' (red card) 51'; Virgili 76'	Report	Brockie 60'	Stadium: Magic Park; Referee: Kris Griffiths-Jones

16 September 2014	Sydney United 58 (Australia)	1–1	(New Zealand) Wellington Phoenix	Sydney, Australia
	Kofinas 63'	Report	Hicks 2'	Stadium: Sydney United Sports Centre

19 September 2014	Sydney FC (Australia)	0–0	(New Zealand) Wellington Phoenix	Wollongong, Australia
19:30 AEST		Report		Stadium: WIN Stadium; Referee: Strebre Delovski

28 September 2014	Wellington Phoenix (New Zealand)	6–2	(New Zealand) Canterbury United	Wellington, New Zealand
14:30 NZST	Bonevacia 27'; Brockie 35'; Rodriguez 40'; 64' (o.g.); Cunningham 66'; Boyd 75'	Report	Schwarz 68' (pen.); Welbourn 88'	Stadium: Westpac Stadium

== Competitions ==
=== Overall ===
Competition	Started round	Final position / round	First match	Last match
A-League	—	4th	12 October 2014	26 April 2015
A-League Finals	Elimination-finals	Elimination-finals	3 May 2015	3 May 2015
FFA Cup	Round of 32	Round of 32	5 August 2014	5 August 2014
ASB Premiership	—	6th	2 November 2014	14 March 2015

=== A-League ===
==== League table ====
Pos	Team	Pld	W	D	L	GF	GA	GD	Pts	Qualification
1	Melbourne Victory (C)	27	15	8	4	56	31	+25	53	Qualification for 2016 AFC Champions League group stage and Finals series
2	Sydney FC	27	14	8	5	52	35	+17	50	Qualification for 2016 AFC Champions League group stage and Finals series
3	Adelaide United	27	14	4	9	47	32	+15	46	Qualification for 2016 AFC Champions League qualifying play-off and Finals series
4	Wellington Phoenix (Note: Wellington Phoenix cannot qualify for the AFC Champions League as they are not recognised as an AFC club.)	27	14	4	9	45	35	+10	46	Qualification for Finals series
5	Melbourne City	27	9	8	10	36	41	−5	35	Qualification for Finals series
6	Brisbane Roar	27	10	4	13	42	43	−1	34	Qualification for Finals series
7	Perth Glory (Note: Perth Glory disqualified from the Finals series and given a compulsory 7th-place finish due to salary cap violations.)	27	14	8	5	45	35	+10	50	
8	Central Coast Mariners	27	5	8	14	26	50	−24	23	
9	Western Sydney Wanderers	27	4	6	17	29	44	−15	18	
10	Newcastle Jets	27	3	8	16	23	55	−32	17	

Source: A-League
Rules for classification: 1) points; 2) goal difference; 3) number of goals scored.
(C) Champions

==== Results summary ====
Overall								Home						Away					
Pld	W	D	L	GF	GA	GD	Pts	W	D	L	GF	GA	GD	W	D	L	GF	GA	GD
27	14	4	9	45	35	+10	46	7	3	4	24	17	+7	7	1	5	21	18	+3

Last updated: 26 April 2015.
Source: ultimatealeague.com

==== Results by round ====
Round	1	2	3	4	5	6	7	8	9	10	11	12	13	14	15	16	17	18	19	20	21	22	23	24	25	26	27
Ground	H	A	H	A	H	A	A	H	A	H	A	H	A	H	A	A	H	H	A	H	A	A	H	H	A	H	H
Result	L	W	W	L	W	L	L	W	W	D	W	W	W	W	L	L	D	D	W	W	W	W	L	L	D	W	L
Position	7	5	4	5	5	5	5	5	5	5	3	3	3	2	4	4	4	4	4	2	1	1	1	4	5	4	4

Updated to match(es) played on 26 April 2015. Source: ultimatealeague.com
A = Away; H = Home; W = Win; D = Draw; L = Loss

==== Matches ====
12 October 2014 1	Wellington Phoenix	1–2	Perth Glory	Wellington
Sunday 17:00 NZDT	McGlinchey 73'	Report	Keogh 32'; Maclaren 86'	Stadium: Westpac Stadium; Attendance: 7,767; Referee: Alan Milliner

18 October 2014 2	Central Coast Mariners	1–2	Wellington Phoenix	Gosford
Saturday 17:00 AEDT	Doyle 12' (o.g.)	Report	McGlinchey 35'; Burns 54'	Stadium: Central Coast Stadium; Attendance: 7,237; Referee: Ben Williams

26 October 2014 3	Wellington Phoenix	4–1	Newcastle Jets	Wellington
Sunday 17:00 NZDT	Burns 4', 42'; McGlinchey 64'; Durante 90+4'	Report	J. Griffiths 90'	Stadium: Westpac Stadium; Attendance: 7,802; Referee: Chris Beath

3 November 2014 4	Melbourne Victory	2–0	Wellington Phoenix	Melbourne
Sunday 19:30 AEDT	Finkler 24'; Pain 68'	Report		Stadium: AAMI Park; Attendance: 23,827; Referee: Shaun Evans

7 November 2014 5	Wellington Phoenix	1–0	Western Sydney Wanderers	Wellington
Friday 19:40 NZDT	Burns 79'	Report		Stadium: Westpac Stadium; Attendance: 7,008; Referee: Lucien Laverdure

15 November 2014 6	Adelaide United	2–1	Wellington Phoenix	Adelaide
Saturday 16:30 ACDT	Boogaard 36'; Cirio 90+4'	Report	Bonevacia 15'	Stadium: Coopers Stadium; Attendance: 9,726; Referee: Strebre Delovski

21 November 2014 7	Perth Glory	2–1	Wellington Phoenix	Perth
Friday 18:45 AWST	De Silva 2'; Keogh 60'; Zadkovich (red card) 63'	Report	Krishna 84' (pen.)	Stadium: nib Stadium; Attendance: 9,233; Referee: Lucien Laverdure

30 November 2014 8	Wellington Phoenix	5–1	Melbourne City	Wellington
Sunday 17:00 NZDT	Burns 34', 47', 85' (pen.); Bonevacia 40'; Krishna 50'	Report	Williams 68' (pen.)	Stadium: Westpac Stadium; Attendance: 7,410; Referee: Jarred Gillett

6 December 2014 9	Newcastle Jets	1–3	Wellington Phoenix	Newcastle
Saturday 17:00 AEDT	J. Griffiths 24'	Report	Burns 73'; McGlinchey 74'; Krishna 78'	Stadium: Hunter Stadium; Attendance: 9,152; Referee: Adam Fielding

13 December 2014 10	Wellington Phoenix	1–1	Central Coast Mariners	Auckland
Saturday 17:00 NZDT	Krishna 76'	Report	Simon 40'	Stadium: Eden Park; Attendance: 11,051; Referee: Alan Milliner

21 December 2014 11	Sydney FC	0–2	Wellington Phoenix	Sydney
Sunday 17:00 AEDT		Report	Burns 73', 81'	Stadium: Allianz Stadium; Attendance: 14,672; Referee: Shaun Evans

28 December 2014 12	Wellington Phoenix	1–0	Western Sydney Wanderers	Wellington
Sunday 19:00 NZDT	Krishna 14'	Report		Stadium: Westpac Stadium; Attendance: 8,606; Referee: Peter O'Leary

31 December 2014 13	Adelaide United	1–3	Wellington Phoenix	Adelaide
Wednesday 19:00 ACDT	Cirio 73'	Report	Cunningham 54'; Boyd 77', 90+3'	Stadium: Coopers Stadium; Attendance: 10,060; Referee: Kris Griffiths-Jones

4 January 2015 14	Wellington Phoenix	3–0	Brisbane Roar	Wellington
Sunday 17:00 NZDT	Muscat 4'; Brockie 51' (pen.), 67'	Report		Stadium: Westpac Stadium; Attendance: 10,267; Referee: Stephen Lucas

2 February 2015 15	Brisbane Roar	3–2	Wellington Phoenix	Brisbane
Monday 19:00 AEST	Donachie 60'; Borrello 76'; Solórzano 90+2'	Report	Krishna 50'; Cunningham 81'	Stadium: Suncorp Stadium; Attendance: 9,263; Referee: Alan Milliner

8 February 2015 16	Western Sydney Wanderers	2–0	Wellington Phoenix	Penrith
Sunday 17:00 AEDT	Rukavytsya 18'; Šantalab 90+1'	Report		Stadium: Sportingbet Stadium; Attendance: 12,663; Referee: Stephen Lucas

14 February 2015 17	Wellington Phoenix	0–0	Melbourne City	Lower Hutt
Saturday 17:00 NZDT		Report		Stadium: Hutt Recreation Ground; Attendance: 9,232; Referee: Chris Beath

22 February 2015 18	Wellington Phoenix	2–2	Newcastle Jets	Lower Hutt
Sunday 17:00 NZDT	Krishna 68'; Hicks 90+4'	Report	Bonevacia 12' (o.g.); Neville 18'; B. Kantarovski (yellow card) 21' (yellow-red card) 87'	Stadium: Hutt Recreation Ground; Attendance: 8,437; Referee: Kris Griffiths-Jones

1 March 2015 19	Melbourne Victory	2–3	Wellington Phoenix	Melbourne
Sunday 17:00 AEDT	Galloway 34'; Barbarouses 53'	Report	Bonevacia 42'; Boxall 68'; Burns 77'	Stadium: AAMI Park; Attendance: 22,096; Referee: Jarred Gillett

7 March 2015 20	Wellington Phoenix	2–0	Adelaide United	Lower Hutt
Saturday 17:00 NZDT	J. Griffiths 79'; Burns 82'	Report		Stadium: Hutt Recreation Ground; Attendance: 7,819; Referee: Ben Williams

14 March 2015 21	Perth Glory	1–2	Wellington Phoenix	Perth
Saturday 18:30 AWST	Zadkovich 29'	Report	Krishna 23', 78'	Stadium: nib Stadium; Attendance: 9,178; Referee: Chris Beath

22 March 2015 22	Brisbane Roar	1–2	Wellington Phoenix	Brisbane
Sunday 16:00 AEST	Kaluđerović 5'	Report	McGlinchey 20'; Burns 45'	Stadium: Suncorp Stadium; Attendance: 10,075; Referee: Alan Milliner

29 March 2015 23	Wellington Phoenix	0–3	Sydney FC	Wellington
Sunday 17:00 NZDT		Report	Faty 9'; Smeltz 28' (red card) 70'; Muscat 40' (o.g.)	Stadium: Westpac Stadium; Attendance: 6,236; Referee: Peter Green

5 April 2015 24	Wellington Phoenix	0–3	Melbourne Victory	Wellington
Sunday 19:00 NZST		Report	Finkler 1'; Durante 59' (o.g.); Thompson 66'	Stadium: Westpac Stadium; Attendance: 8,417; Referee: Kris Griffiths-Jones

12 April 2015 25	Melbourne City	0–0	Wellington Phoenix	Melbourne
Sunday 17:00 AEST		Report		Stadium: AAMI Park; Attendance: 6,720; Referee: Peter Green

17 April 2015 26	Wellington Phoenix	3–2	Central Coast Mariners	Wellington
Friday 19:40 NZST	Bonevacia 65'; Cunningham 79', 90+5'	Report	Fitzgerald 11'; Bosnar 35'	Stadium: Westpac Stadium; Attendance: 6,868; Referee: Peter O'Leary

26 April 2015 27	Wellington Phoenix	1–2	Sydney FC	Wellington
Sunday 17:00 NZST	Boxall 46'	Report	Ibini 14'; Smeltz 32' (pen.)	Stadium: Westpac Stadium; Attendance: 13,248; Referee: Strebre Delovski

==== Finals series ====
3 May 2015 Elimination-finals	Wellington Phoenix	0–2	Melbourne City	Wellington
19:00 NZST (UTC+12:00)		Report	Kennedy 61'; Moss 72' (o.g.)	Stadium: Westpac Stadium; Attendance: 10,171; Referee: Ben Williams

=== FFA Cup ===
5 August 2014 Round of 32	Adelaide United	1–0	Wellington Phoenix	Adelaide
19:30 AEST	Cirio 31'	Report		Stadium: Marden Sports Complex; Attendance: 2,804; Referee: Shaun Evans

=== ASB Premiership ===
==== League table ====
Pos	Team	Pld	W	D	L	GF	GA	GD	Pts	Qualification
1	Auckland City	16	14	0	2	39	14	+25	42	Qualification to the 2015–16 OFC Champions League
2	Team Wellington	16	9	3	4	32	24	+8	30	Qualification to the 2015 ASB Premiership Finals (Note: The second OFC Champions League spot will be awarded to the team who wins the grand final, or the league runner-up if the premiers also win the grand final)
3	Hawke's Bay United	16	8	3	5	34	29	+5	27	Qualification to the 2015 ASB Premiership Finals
4	Waitakere United	16	8	2	6	29	23	+6	26	Qualification to the 2015 ASB Premiership Finals
5	WaiBOP United	16	7	1	8	24	29	−5	22	
6	Wellington Phoenix	16	7	0	9	37	42	−5	21	
7	Wanderers SC	16	5	2	9	24	29	−5	17	
8	Canterbury United	16	4	2	10	22	32	−10	14	
9	Southern United	16	3	1	12	20	39	−19	10	

Updated to match(es) played on 16 March 2015. Source: NZ Football

==== Results summary ====
Overall								Home						Away					
Pld	W	D	L	GF	GA	GD	Pts	W	D	L	GF	GA	GD	W	D	L	GF	GA	GD
16	7	0	9	37	42	−5	21	3	0	5	17	22	−5	4	0	4	20	20	0

Last updated: 16 March 2015.
Source: soccerway.com

==== Results by round ====
Round	1	2	3	4	5	6	7	8	9	10	11	12	13	14	15	16	17	18
Ground	A	H	B	H	A	A	H	A	A	H	A	B	A	H	H	A	H	H
Result	L	W	✖	L	W	W	L	L	W	L	L	✖	L	W	L	W	W	L
Position	8	3	5	7	4	3	3	5	3	4	5	7	7	6	6	6	5	6

Updated to match(es) played on 16 March 2015. Source: soccerway.com
A = Away; H = Home; W = Win; D = Draw; L = Loss

==== Matches ====
2 November 2014 1	Team Wellington	2–1	Phoenix Premiers	Wellington
15:00 NZDT	Corrales 38'; Peverley 82' (pen.)	Report	Boyd 29'; Rufer (yellow card) ?' (red card) 84'	Stadium: David Farrington Park

8 November 2014 2	Phoenix Premiers	3–0	Wanderers SC	Wellington
14:00 NZDT	Cunningham 8'; Boyd 26'; Messenger 65' (o.g.)	Report		Stadium: Newtown Park

23 November 2014 4	Phoenix Premiers	1–2	Waitakere United	Wellington
14:00 NZDT	Boyd 21'	Report	Dickinson 87'; Biss 90+1'	Stadium: Newtown Park

30 November 2014 5	Southern United	3–4	Phoenix Premiers	Invercargill
14:00 NZDT	Jackson 19', 90'; Hindson 35'	Report	Hailemariam 9'; Stevens 42' (pen.), 59', 80' (pen.)	Stadium: Rugby Park Stadium

7 December 2014 6	Hawke's Bay United	2–5	Phoenix Premiers	Napier
14:00 NZDT	Tinsley 31' (pen.); Barcia 52'	Report	Ridenton 20'; Hailemariam 30', 71'; Boyd 45' (pen.), 50'	Stadium: Bluewater Stadium

13 December 2014 7	Phoenix Premiers	0–2	WaiBOP United	Auckland
14:15 NZDT		Report	Marquez 18', 25'	Stadium: Eden Park

20 December 2014 8	Canterbury United	2–0	Phoenix Premiers	Christchurch
14:00 NZDT	Schwarz 37'; Clapham 43'	Report		Stadium: ASB Football Park

11 January 2015 9	Auckland City	1–3	Phoenix Premiers	Auckland
14:00 NZDT	Tavano 45+1'; Bilen (red card) 88'	Report	Hailemariam 15', 27'; Stevens 17'; Doyle (red card) 88'	Stadium: Kiwitea Street

17 January 2015 10	Phoenix Premiers	3–4	Team Wellington	Wellington
14:00 NZDT	Stevens 4'; Brindell-South 38'; Hailemariam 75'	Report	Peverley 15' (pen.) (yellow card) ?' (yellow-red card) 55'; Gwyther 48', 62'; Feneridis 82'	Stadium: Newtown Park; Attendance: 1,000

25 January 2015 11	Wanderers SC	2–1	Phoenix Premiers	Whangārei
13:00 NZDT	de Jong 15'; Hudson-Wihongi 74'	Report	Hicks 80'	Stadium: Toll Stadium; Attendance: 986

8 February 2014 13	Waitakere United	6–3	Phoenix Premiers	West Auckland
14:00 NZDT	Mulligan 11'; Solomons 29'; Bowen 36'; Bale 78'; Richards 83', 84'	Report	Hailemariam 5'; Boyd 54'; Doyle 79'	Stadium: Fred Taylor Park

15 February 2015 14	Phoenix Premiers	6–2	Southern United	Lower Hutt
14:00 NZDT	Hailemariam 53'; Boyd 84' (pen.), 88' (pen.), 89', 90+3' (pen.); Rufer 90+1'	Report	Jackson 3', 14'; Fitzpatrick (red card) 88'	Stadium: Hutt Recreation Ground

21 February 2015 15	Phoenix Premiers	2–4	Hawke's Bay United	Petone
14:00 NZDT	Cahill-Fleury 5'; Hailermariam 62'	Report	Lovemore 51', 79'; Lekaj 64'; Tinsley 65' (pen.)	Stadium: Petone Memorial Park

28 February 2015 16	WaiBOP United	2–3	Phoenix Premiers	Cambridge
15:00 NZDT	Coombes 35', 43'	Report	Blake 45+4'; Cahill-Fleury 76'; Stevens 88'	Stadium: John Kerkhof Park

7 March 2015 17	Phoenix Premiers	2–1	Canterbury United	Petone
14:00 NZDT	Stevens 51' (pen.); Pratt 74'	Report	Spain 56'	Stadium: Petone Memorial Park

14 March 2015 18	Phoenix Premiers	0–7	Auckland City	Wellington
14:00 NZDT		Report	De Vries 20', 60'; Óscar 24'; Moreira 32' (pen.), 43'; Carril 55'; A. Milne 73'	Stadium: Newtown Park
