= 2014–15 New Zealand Football Championship =

ASB Premiership
- Season: 2014–15
- Champions: Auckland City
- Premiers: Auckland City
- OFC Champions League: Auckland City; Team Wellington
- Matches: 72
- Goals: 261 (3.63 per match)
- Top goalscorer: Tyler Boyd (10); Tom Jackson (10); Sean Lovemore (10)
- Biggest home win: Wellington Phoenix 6–2 Southern United; 14 February 2015; Waitakere United 4–0 Team Wellington; 14 March 2015
- Biggest away win: Wellington Phoenix 0–7 Auckland City; 14 March 2015
- Highest scoring: Waitakere United 6–3 Wellington Phoenix; 3 February 2015
- All statistics correct as of 10 March 2015.

The 2014–15 New Zealand Football Championship season (currently known as the ASB Premiership for sponsorship reasons) was the eleventh season of the NZFC since its establishment in 2004. Nine teams are involved this season, which includes the newly formed Wellington Phoenix reserve team. Auckland City and Team Wellington will represent the ASB Premiership in the 2014–15 OFC Champions League after finishing Champions and Runners-up respectively in the 2013–14 competition.

== Clubs ==
Team	Location	Stadium	Capacity	Manager	Kit manufacturer	Shirt sponsor
Auckland City	Sandringham, Auckland	Kiwitea Street	3,500	(Spain) Ramon Tribulietx	Nike	Trillian Trust Inc.
Canterbury United	Christchurch	ASB Football Park	9,000	(Republic of Ireland) Sean Devine	Samurai	Robbie's Bar and Bistro
Hawke's Bay United	Napier	Bluewater Stadium	5,000	(England) Brett Angell	Lotto Sport Italia	Kinetic Electrical
Southern United	Dunedin	Forsyth Barr Stadium	30,500	(Scotland) Mike Fridge	Lotto Sport Italia	Gran's Remedy
Team Wellington	Wellington	David Farrington Park	3,000	(New Zealand) Matt Calcott	Nike	Exodus Health & Fitness Club
WaiBOP United	Cambridge	John Kerkhof Park	2,700	(Scotland) Peter Smith	Lotto Sport Italia	The Soccer Shop
Waitakere United	Whenuapai, Auckland	Fred Taylor Park	2,500	(Republic of Ireland) Brian Shelley	Lotto Sport Italia	Cuesports Foundation
Wanderers SC	Albany, Auckland	QBE Stadium	25,000	(England) Darren Bazeley	Nike	Trillian Trust Inc.
Wellington Phoenix	Wellington	Newtown Park	5,000	(England) Andy Hedge	Adidas	Huawei

=== Kits ===
Auckland City FC	Canterbury United	Hawke's Bay United	Southern United	Team Wellington
WaiBOP United	Waitakere United	Wanderers SC	Wellington Phoenix

== Regular season ==
=== League table ===
Pos	Team	Pld	W	D	L	GF	GA	GD	Pts	Qualification
1	Auckland City (C)	16	14	0	2	39	14	+25	42	Qualification to the Champions League and Finals series
2	Team Wellington	16	9	3	4	32	24	+8	30	Qualification to the Champions League and Finals series
3	Hawke's Bay United	16	8	3	5	34	29	+5	27	Qualification to the Finals series
4	Waitakere United	16	8	2	6	29	23	+6	26	Qualification to the Finals series
5	WaiBOP United	16	7	1	8	24	29	−5	22	
6	Wellington Phoenix Reserves	16	7	0	9	37	42	−5	21	
7	Wanderers SC	16	5	2	9	24	29	−5	17	Disbanded at end of season
8	Canterbury United	16	4	2	10	22	32	−10	14	
9	Southern United	16	3	1	12	20	39	−19	10	

Updated to match(es) played on 10 March 2015. Source: NZ Football
(C) Champions

=== Positions by round ===
Team ╲ Round	1	2	3	4	5	6	7	8	9	10	11	12	13	14	15	16	17	18
Auckland City	1	1	1	1	1	1	2	1	1	1	1	1	1	1	1	1	1	1
Team Wellington	4	2	2	2	2	2	1	2	2	2	2	2	2	2	2	2	2	2
Hawke's Bay United	5	7	4	6	6	6	4	3	4	5	6	4	5	4	3	3	3	3
Waitakere United	3	5	7	3	3	4	5	6	6	7	7	6	4	5	4	4	4	4
WaiBOP United	8	8	8	8	8	8	7	7	7	3	4	3	3	3	5	6	6	5
Wellington Phoenix	7	3	5	7	4	3	3	5	3	4	5	7	7	6	6	5	5	6
Wanderers SC	5	9	9	9	9	9	9	9	9	9	8	8	8	7	7	7	7	7
Canterbury United	2	4	6	5	7	7	6	4	5	6	3	5	6	8	8	8	8	8
Southern United	9	6	3	4	5	5	8	8	8	8	9	9	9	9	9	9	9	9

=== Fixtures and results ===
The 2014–15 season sees every team play the other both home and away. With the introduction of the Wellington Phoenix Reserves side creating an uneven number of teams, each team has two byes in the regular season. However, due to Auckland City FC's participation in the 2014 OFC President's Cup and the 2014 FIFA Club World Cup, several matches and byes have been rescheduled.

==== Round 4 (rescheduled) ====
25 October 2014	Southern United	0–3	Auckland City FC	Forsyth Barr Stadium, Dunedin
Saturday, 13:00 NZDT; Match rescheduled due to Auckland City competing in the OFC Presidents Cup		Report	Payne 25'; Vicelich 28'; Tade 52'	Referee: Campbell Kirk-Waugh

==== Round 1 ====
1 November 2014	Waitakere United	3–2	Wanderers SC	Fred Taylor Park, Auckland
Saturday, 14:00 NZDT	Biss 30'; Mulligan 40'; Boyens 61'	Report	Murati 6' de Jong 18'

1 November 2014	Canterbury United	2–0	WaiBOP United	ASB Football Park, Christchurch
Saturday, 14:00 NZDT	Schwarz 28'; Stansfield 62'	Report

2 November 2014	Auckland City FC	3–2	Hawke's Bay United	Kiwitea Street, Auckland
Sunday, 14:00 NZDT	Morton 25' (o.g.); Tavano 45'; Tade 64'	Report	Halpin 7'; Lovemore 77'	Referee: Matt Conger

2 November 2014	Team Wellington	2–1	Wellington Phoenix	David Farrington Park, Wellington
Sunday, 15:00 NZDT	Corrales 36'; Peverley 80' (pen.)	Report	Boyd 28'; Rufer (yellow card) ?' (yellow-red card) 82'	Referee: Peter O'Leary

Bye: Southern United

==== Round 8 (rescheduled) ====
8 November 2014	Waitakere United	0–1	Auckland City FC	Fred Taylor Park, Auckland
Saturday, 13:00 NZDT; Match rescheduled due to Auckland City competing in the FIFA Club World Cup		Report	Browne 90'	Referee: Peter O'Leary

==== Round 2 ====
8 November 2014	Canterbury United	0–1	Southern United	ASB Football Park, Christchurch
Saturday, 14:00 NZDT		Report	G. Milne 35'

9 November 2014	Wellington Phoenix	3–0	Wanderers SC	Newtown Park, Wellington
Sunday, 14:00 NZDT	Cunningham 8'; Boyd 26'; Messenger 65' (o.g.)	Report

9 November 2014	Hawke's Bay United	2–2	Team Wellington	Bluewater Stadium, Napier
Sunday, 14:00 NZDT	Lekaj 12'; Haviland 90'	Report	7' J. Smith; 54' Fa'arodo	Referee: Chris Kerr

==== Round 6 (rescheduled) ====
12 November 2014	Auckland City FC	3–0	Wanderers SC	Kiwitea Street, Auckland
Wednesday, 17:45 NZDT; Match rescheduled due to Auckland City competing in the FIFA Club World Cup	Tavano 11'; A. Milne 17', 65'	Report		Referee: Chris Kerr

==== Round 3 ====
15 November 2014	Southern United	2–1	Waitakere United	Forsyth Barr Stadium, Dunedin
Saturday, 13:00 NZDT	Ridden 16'; Da Costa 66'	Report	Richards 59'

16 November 2014	Team Wellington	3–2	WaiBOP United	David Farrington Park, Wellington
Sunday, 15:00 NZDT	Corrales 19'; Robertson 60'; Gwyther 72'	Report	Higgins 10'; Marquez 20'; Molony (red card) 50'

16 November 2014	Wanderers SC	1–2	Hawke's Bay United	Michaels Ave Reserve, Auckland
Sunday, 15:00 NZDT	de Jong 29' (pen.)	Report	Lekaj 34'; Gowan Stares 42' (o.g.)

Bye: Wellington Phoenix
Bye: Canterbury United (rescheduled from Round 15)

==== Round 4 ====
22 November 2014	WaiBOP United	3–1	Wanderers SC	Links Ave Reserve, Mount Maunganui
Saturday, 15:00 NZDT	O'Regan 3'; Coombes 10'; Higgins 62'	Report	Lewis 74'

23 November 2014	Wellington Phoenix	1–2	Waitakere United	Newtown Park, Wellington
Sunday, 14:00 NZDT	Boyd 21'	Report	Dickinson 87'; Biss 90+1'

23 November 2014	Canterbury United	2–2	Team Wellington	ASB Football Park, Christchurch
Sunday, 15:30 NZDT	Hofmann 19'; Spain 89'	Report	Fa'arodo 51'; Chettleburgh 86'

Bye: Hawke's Bay United

==== Round 5 ====
29 November 2014	Waitakere United	1–1	Hawke's Bay United	Fred Taylor Park, Auckland
Saturday, 14:00 NZDT	Biss 26' (pen.)	Report	Tinsley 27' (pen.)	Referee: Chris Kerr

29 November 2014	Team Wellington	4–0	Auckland City FC	David Farrington Park, Wellington
Saturday, 15:00 NZDT	Gwyther 20', 62'; Corrales 60'; J. Smith 74'	Report	Đorđević (yellow card) ?' (yellow-red card) 62'	Referee: Matt Conger

30 November 2014	Southern United	3–4	Wellington Phoenix	Rugby Park Stadium, Invercargill
Sunday, 14:00 NZDT	Jackson 19', 90'; Hindson 35'	Report	Hailemariam 9'; Stevens 42' (pen.), 59', 80' (pen.)

30 November 2014	Wanderers SC	3–1	Canterbury United	Seddon Fields, Auckland
Sunday, 15:00 NZDT	Baker 30'; Messenger 56'; Brotherton 71'	Report	Schwarz 44'

Bye: WaiBOP United

==== Round 6 ====
6 December 2014	WaiBOP United	1–1	Waitakere United	Links Ave Reserve, Mount Maunganui
Saturday, 15:00 NZDT	Varela 76'	Report	Biss 36'

7 December 2014	Hawke's Bay United	2–5	Wellington Phoenix	Bluewater Stadium, Napier
Sunday, 14:00 NZDT	Tinsley 31' (pen.); Barcia 52'	Report	Ridenton 20'; Hailemariam 30', 71'; Boyd 45' (pen.), 50'

7 December 2014	Team Wellington	2–0	Southern United	David Farrington Park, Wellington
Sunday, 15:00 NZDT	Corrales 2' (red card) 25'; Feneridis 15'	Report

Bye: Canterbury United

==== Round 7 ====
13 December 2014	Waitakere United	0–2	Canterbury United	Fred Taylor Park, Auckland
Saturday, 14:00 NZDT		Report	Barton 16'; O'Brien 75'

14 December 2014	Wellington Phoenix	0–2	WaiBOP United	Eden Park, Auckland
Saturday, 14:00 NZDT		Report	Marquez 18', 25'

14 December 2014	Hawke's Bay United	3–1	Southern United	Bluewater Stadium, Napier
Sunday, 14:00 NZDT	Tinsley 28' (pen.); Barbero 30'; Halpin 55'	Report	Jackson 6'

14 December 2014	Wanderers SC	1–4	Team Wellington	Bill McKinlay Park, Auckland
Sunday, 15:00 NZDT	Mitchell 3'	Report	Morris 45'; Fleming 52'; Bechar 62'; Robertson 78'

Bye: Auckland City FC

==== Round 8 ====
20 December 2014	Canterbury United	2–0	Wellington Phoenix	ASB Football Park, Christchurch
Saturday, 14:00 NZDT	Schwarz 37'; Clapham 43'	Report

20 December 2014	WaiBOP United	2–4	Hawke's Bay United	Rotorua International Stadium, Rotorua
Saturday, 16:00 NZDT	Wylie 22' (red card) 58'; Coombes 57'	Report	Haviland 29'; Lovemore 41', 72'; Tinsley 75'

21 December 2014	Wanderers SC	3–3	Southern United	Seddon Fields, Auckland
Sunday, 14:00 NZDT	Kilkolly 1' de Jong 21'; Messenger 70'	Report	Connor 8'; Fitzpatrick 80'; Jackson 85'

Bye: Team Wellington
Bye: Waitakere United rescheduled from Round 2

==== Round 9 ====
10 January 2015	Canterbury United	1–1	Hawke's Bay United	ASB Football Park, Christchurch
Saturday, 14:00 NZDT	Clapham 55' (pen.)	Report	Tinsley 47' (pen.)

11 January 2015	Auckland City FC	1–3	Wellington Phoenix	Kiwitea Street, Auckland
Sunday, 14:00 NZDT	Tavano 45+1'; Bilen (red card) 88'	Report	Hailemariam 15', 27'; Stevens 17'; Doyle (red card) 88'

11 January 2015	Southern United	0–1	WaiBOP United	Caledonian Ground, Dunedin
Sunday, 14:00 NZDT		Report	O'Regan 35'

11 January 2015	Team Wellington	1–2	Waitakere United	David Farrington Park, Wellington
Sunday, 15:00 NZDT	Robertson 28' (yellow card) ?' (yellow-red card) 90+1'; Musa (yellow card) ?' (yellow-red card) 54'	Report	Butler 52'; Manickum 68'

Bye: Wanderers SC

==== Round 15 (rescheduled) ====
14 January 2015	Wanderers SC	0–1	Auckland City FC	QBE Stadium, Auckland
Wednesday, 18:00 NZDT		Report	Vicelich 61'

==== Round 10 ====
17 January 2015	Wellington Phoenix	3–4	Team Wellington	Newton Park, Wellington
Saturday, 14:00 NZDT	Stevens 4'; Brindell-South 38'; Hailemariam 75'	Report	Peverley 15' (pen.) (yellow card) ?' (yellow-red card) 55'; Gwyther 48', 62'; Feneridis 82'

17 January 2015	WaiBOP United	4–3	Canterbury United	John Kerkhof Park, Cambridge
Saturday, 15:00 NZDT	Molony 46'; Neil 64', 90'; Jones 81'	Report	Clapham 35', 68' (pen.); Wellbourn 48'

17 January 2015	Wanderers SC	2–0	Waitakere United	QBE Stadium, Auckland
Saturday, 15:00 NZDT	Holthusen 13'; Lewis 80'	Report

18 January 2015	Hawke's Bay United	0–3	Auckland City FC	Bluewater Stadium, Napier
Sunday, 14:00 NZDT		Report	Tade 58' (pen.); Vicelich 77'; Burfoot 80'

Bye: Southern United

==== Round 11 ====
25 January 2015	Wanderers SC	2–1	Wellington Phoenix	Toll Stadium, Whangārei
Sunday, 13:00 NZDT	de Jong 15'; Hudson-Wihongi 74'	Report	Hicks 80'	Attendance: 986

25 January 2015	Auckland City FC	3–2	WaiBOP United	Kiwitea Street, Auckland
Sunday, 14:00 NZDT	Burfoot 5'; Đorđević 45+1', 58'	Report	Jones 28'; Marquez 78'

25 January 2015	Southern United	1–3	Canterbury United	Forsyth Barr Stadium, Dunedin
Sunday, 14:00 NZDT	Jackson 88'	Report	O'Brien 14'; Clapham 57'; Stanley 90+4'

25 January 2015	Team Wellington	1–0	Hawke's Bay United	David Farrington Park, Wellington
Sunday, 15:00 NZDT	J. Smith 78'	Report

Bye: Waitakere United

==== Round 12 ====
31 January 2015	Canterbury United	0–1	Auckland City FC	ASB Football Park, Christchurch
Saturday, 14:00 NZDT		Report	De Vries 55'

31 January 2015	WaiBOP United	2–1	Team Wellington	John Kerkhof Park, Cambridge
Saturday, 15:00 NZDT	Wylie 38'; Marquez 45'	Report	Corrales 5'

1 February 2015	Waitakere United	3–1	Southern United	Fred Taylor Park, Auckland
Sunday, 14:00 NZDT	Manickum 4', 12'; Porter 78'	Report	Fitzpatrick 57'

1 February 2015	Hawke's Bay United	3–1	Wanderers SC	Bluewater Stadium, Napier
Sunday, 14:00 NZDT	Lekaj 1'; F. Milne 45'; Pennycooke-Morgan 90+2'	Report	Hudson-Wihongi 80'

Bye: Wellington Phoenix

==== Round 13 ====
8 February 2015	Auckland City FC	4–2	Southern United	Kiwitea Street, Auckland
Sunday, 14:00 NZDT	Benjudah Fitzpatrick 4' (o.g.); Browne 5', 47'; Đorđević 87'	Report	McIntyre 29'; Jackson 62'

8 February 2015	Waitakere United	6–3	Wellington Phoenix	Fred Taylor Park, Auckland
Sunday, 14:00 NZDT	Mulligan 11'; Solomons 29'; Bowen 36'; Bale 78'; Richards 83', 84'	Report	Hailemariam 5'; Boyd 54'; Doyle 79'

8 February 2015	Wanderers SC	1–2	WaiBOP United	QBE Stadium, Auckland
Sunday, 15:00 NZDT	Baker 57'	Report	Elia 75'; Wylie 76'

8 February 2015	Team Wellington	3–0	Canterbury United	David Farrington Park, Wellington
Sunday, 15:00 NZDT	J. Smith 43', 78'; Corrales 66'	Report

Bye: Hawke's Bay United

==== Round 14 ====
14 February 2015	Wellington Phoenix	6–2	Southern United	Petone Memorial Park, Lower Hutt
Saturday, 14:00 NZDT	Hailemariam 53'; Boyd 84' (pen.), 88' (pen.), 89', 90+3' (pen.); Rufer 90+1'	Report	Jackson 3', 14'; Fitzpatrick (red card) 88'

15 February 2015	Canterbury United	1–4	Wanderers SC	ASB Football Park, Christchurch
Sunday, 14:00 NZDT	Hofmann 87'	Report	Lewis 18'; Baker 52' de Jong 58'; Murati 82'

15 February 2015	Auckland City FC	3–0	Team Wellington	Kiwitea Street, Auckland
Sunday, 14:00 NZDT	Irving 8' (pen.); Carril 13'; Óscar 90'	Report

15 February 2015	Hawke's Bay United	3–2	Waitakere United	Bluewater Stadium, Napier
Sunday, 14:15 NZDT	Lovemore 10', 49'; Palezevic 62'	Report	Bowen 8', 72'

Bye: WaiBOP United

==== Round 2 (rescheduled) ====
18 February 2015	WaiBOP United	0–2	Auckland City FC	John Kerkhof Park, Cambridge
Wednesday, 18:00 NZDT		Report	Browne 28'; Burfoot 90'	Referee: Campbell-Kirk Waugh

==== Round 15 ====
21 February 2015	Wellington Phoenix	2–4	Hawke's Bay United	Petone Memorial Park, Lower Hutt
Saturday, 13:30 NZDT	Cahill-Fleury 5'; Hailermariam 62'	Report	Lovemore 51', 79'; Lekaj 64'; Tinsley 65' (pen.)

21 February 2015	Waitakere United	2–1	WaiBOP United	Fred Taylor Park, West Auckland
Saturday, 14:00 NZDT	Biss 23'; Richards 90+4'	Report	Coombes 14'	Referee: Nicholas Waldron

22 February 2015	Southern United	1–2	Team Wellington	Forsyth Barr Stadium, Dunedin
Sunday, 14:00 NZDT	Jackson 43'	Report	J. Smith 34' (pen.); Gwyther 54'

22 February 2015	Auckland City FC	3–1	Canterbury United	Kiwitea Street, Auckland
Sunday, 14:00 NZDT	Carril 31'; Óscar 56' (pen.); Moreira 66'	Report	Peers 16'	Referee: Campbell-Kirk Waugh

Bye: Wanderers SC

==== Round 16 ====
28 February 2015	Canterbury United	1–2	Waitakere United	ASB Football Park, Christchurch
Saturday, 14:00 NZDT	Terris 87'	Report	Richards 53', 60'

28 January 2015	WaiBOP United	2–3	Wellington Phoenix	John Kerkhof Park, Cambridge
Saturday, 15:00 NZDT	Coombes 35', 43'	Report	Blake 45+4'; Cahill-Fleury 76'; Stevens 88'

1 March 2015	Southern United	1–2	Hawke's Bay United	Forsyth Barr Stadium, Dunedin
Sunday, 13:00 NZDT	Ridden 1'	Report	Lekaj 10'; Tinsley 55' (pen.)

1 March 2015	Team Wellington	1–1	Wanderers SC	David Farrington Park, Wellington
Sunday, 15:00 NZDT	Robertson 13'	Report	Maukau-McPhee 45'

Bye: Auckland City FC

==== Round 17 ====
7 March 2015	Wellington Phoenix	2–1	Canterbury United	Petone Memorial Park, Lower Hutt
Saturday, 14:00 NZDT	Stevens 51' (pen.); Pratt 74'	Report	Spain 56'

8 March 2015	Southern United	1–0	Wanderers SC	Caledonian Ground, Dunedin
Sunday, 14:00 NZDT	Jackson 65' (pen.)	Report	Mitchell (red card) 65'

8 March 2015	Auckland City FC	1–0	Waitakere United	Kiwitea Street, Auckland
Sunday, 14:00 NZDT	Carril 9'	Report

8 March 2015	Hawke's Bay United	0–1	WaiBOP United	Bluewater Stadium, Napier
Sunday, 15:00 NZDT		Report	Marquez 90'

Bye: Team Wellington

==== Round 18 ====
14 March 2015	Waitakere United	4–0	Team Wellington	Fred Taylor Park, West Auckland
Saturday, 14:00 NZDT	Bowen 4'; Biss 15'; Richards 33', 75'	Report

14 March 2015	Wellington Phoenix	0–7	Auckland City FC	Newton Park, Wellington
Saturday, 14:00 NZDT		Report	De Vries 20', 60'; Óscar 24'; Moreira 32' (pen.), 43'; Carril 55'; A. Milne 73'

14 March 2015	WaiBOP United	2–1	Southern United	John Kerkhof Park, Cambridge
Saturday, 17:00 NZDT	Greenhalgh 62' (pen.); Young 74'	Report	McLennan 38'

15 March 2015	Hawke's Bay United	5–2	Canterbury United	Bluewater Stadium, Napier
Sunday, 14:00 NZDT	Lovemore 3', 16', 77'; Tinsley 23'; Haviland 90+3'	Report	Clapham 6' (pen.); Spain 14'

Bye: Wanderers SC

== Finals series ==
Semi-finals
4	Waitakere United	0	1	1
1	Auckland City FC	2	5	7
3	Hawke's Bay United (a)	1	4	5
2	Team Wellington	2	3	5

Finals
1	Auckland City FC	2
3	Hawke's Bay United	1

=== Semi-finals first leg ===
21 March 2015	Waitakere United	0–2	Auckland City	Fred Taylor Park, Auckland
Saturday, 14:00 NZDT		Report	De Vries 27'; Óscar 44'

21 March 2015	Hawke's Bay United	1–2	Team Wellington	Bluewater Stadium, Napier
Saturday, 17:00 NZDT	Halpin 35' (pen.)	Report	Fa'arodo 8', 77'

=== Semi-finals second leg ===
29 March 2015	Team Wellington	3–4 (5 – 5a agg.)	Hawke's Bay United	David Farrington Park, Wellington
Sunday, 13:00 NZDT	Myers 16'; Hogg 36'; Robertson 66'	Report	Lovemore 8'; Tinsley 27' (pen.), 71' (pen.); Barbero 47'

29 March 2015	Auckland City	5–1 (7–1 agg.)	Waitakere United	Kiwitea Street, Auckland
Sunday, 14:00 NZDT	Browne 13', 15', 60'; Moreira 17'; Óscar 71'	Report	Richards 63'

=== Grand final ===
5 April 2015	Auckland City	2–1	Hawke's Bay United	Kiwitea Street, Auckland
Sunday, 14:00 NZST	De Vries 38'; Đorđević 62'	Report	Tinsley 19' (pen.)	Attendance: 1,853; Referee: Peter O'Leary

== Statistics ==
=== Top Goal scorers ===
Rank	Player	Team	Goals per Round																		Goals
Rank	Player	Team	1	2	3	4	5	6	7	8	9	10	11	12	13	14	15	16	17	18	Goals
1=	(New Zealand) Tyler Boyd	Wellington Phoenix	1	1		1		2							1	4					10
1=	(New Zealand) Tom Jackson	Southern United					2		1	1			1		1	2	1		1		10
1=	(New Zealand) Sean Lovemore	Hawke's Bay United	1							2						2	2			3	10
4	(New Zealand) Nathaniel Hailemariam	Wellington Phoenix					1	2			2	1			1	1	1				9
5	(England) Ryan Tinsley	Hawke's Bay United					1	1	1	1	1						1	1		1	8
6=	(New Zealand) Joel Stevens	Wellington Phoenix					3				1	1						1	1		7
6=	(England) Derice Richards	Waitakere United			1										1		1	2		2	7
8=	(Costa Rica) Luis Corrales	Team Wellington	1		1		1	1						1	1						6
8=	(New Zealand) Michael Gwyther	Team Wellington			1		2					2					1				6
8=	(New Zealand) Jarrod Smith	Team Wellington		1			1						1		2		1				6
8=	(Uruguay) Federico Marquez	WaiBOP United			1				2				1	1					1		6
8=	(New Zealand) Tom Biss	Waitakere United	1			1	1	1									1			1	6
8=	(New Zealand) Aaron Clapham	Canterbury United								1	1	2	1							1	6
14=	(New Zealand) Andre de Jong	Wanderers SC	1		1					1			1			1					5
14=	(New Zealand) Chad Coombes	WaiBOP United				1				1							1	2			5
14=	(Croatia) Viktor Lekaj	Hawke's Bay United		1	1									1			1	1			5
17=	(Papua New Guinea) David Browne	Auckland City FC		1*						1*					2						4
17=	(England) Bill Robertson	Team Wellington			1				1		1							1			4
17=	(Australia) Nathaniel Bowen	Waitakere United													1	2				1	4
17=	(Spain) Ivan Carril	Auckland City FC														1	1		1	1	4
21=	(England) Tom Schwarz	Canterbury United	1				1			1											3
21=	(Mexico) Fabrizio Tavano	Auckland City FC	1					1*			1										3
21=	(Argentina) Emiliano Tade	Auckland City FC	1			1*						1									3
21=	(New Zealand) Ivan Vicelich	Auckland City FC				1*						1					1*				3
21=	(New Zealand) Dylan Manickum	Waitakere United									1			2							3
21=	(Serbia) Marko Dordevic	Auckland City FC											2		1						3
21=	(New Zealand) Craig Wylie	WaiBOP United								1				1	1						3
21=	(New Zealand) Clayton Lewis	Wanderers SC				1						1				1					3
21=	(New Zealand) Judd Baker	Wanderers SC					1								1	1					3
21=	(New Zealand) Sam Burfoot	Auckland City FC		1*								1	1								3
21=	(New Zealand) Ryan De Vries	Auckland City FC												1						2	3
21=	(Spain) Óscar García	Auckland City FC														1	1			1	3
21=	(Portugal) Joao Moreira	Auckland City FC															1			2	3
21=	(New Zealand) Andrew Milne	Auckland City FC						2*												1	3
21=	(New Zealand) Ross Haviland	Hawke's Bay United		1						1										1	3
21=	(Papua New Guinea) Aaron Spain	Canterbury United				1													1	1	3
37=	(New Zealand) Liam Higgins	WaiBOP United			1	1															2
37=	(Solomon Islands) Henry Fa'arodo	Team Wellington		1		1															2
37=	(England) Saul Halpin	Hawke's Bay United	1						1												2
37=	(New Zealand) Brock Messenger	Wanderers SC					1			1											2
37=	(England) Sam O'Regan	WaiBOP United				1					1										2
37=	(New Zealand) Cole Peverley	Team Wellington	1									1									2
37=	(New Zealand) Alex Feneridis	Team Wellington						1				1									2
37=	(New Zealand) Fergus Neil	WaiBOP United										2									2
37=	(New Zealand) Mark Jones	WaiBOP United										1	1								2
37=	(New Zealand) Shawn O'Brien	Canterbury United							1				1								2
37=	(New Zealand) Benjudah Fitzpatrick	Southern United								1				1							2
37=	(New Zealand) Te Atawahi Hudson-Wihongi	Wanderers SC											1	1							2
37=	(New Zealand) David Mulligan	Waitakere United	1												1						2
37=	(New Zealand) Andrew Boyens	Waitakere United	1												1						2
37=	(New Zealand) Mario Hoffman	Canterbury United				1										1					2
37=	(New Zealand) Regont Murati	Wanderers SC	1													1					2
37=	(New Zealand) Ruairi Cahill-Fleury	Wellington Phoenix															1	1			2
37=	(New Zealand) Andrew Ridden	Southern United			1													1			2
55=	(New Zealand) Tim Payne	Auckland City FC				1*															1
55=	(New Zealand) Dylan Stansfield	Canterbury United	1																		1
55=	(New Zealand) George Milne	Southern United		1																	1
55=	(Costa Rica) Kenny Cunningham	Wellington Phoenix		1																	1
55=	(France) Victor da Costa	Southern United			1																1
55=	(New Zealand) Adam Dickinson	Waitakere United				1															1
55=	(New Zealand) Cory Chettleburgh	Team Wellington				1															1
55=	(New Zealand) Nicholas Hindson	Southern United					1														1
55=	(New Zealand) Sam Brotherton	Wanderers SC					1														1
55=	(Chile) Alexis Carcamo Varela	Waitakere United						1													1
55=	(Argentina) Mario Barcia	Hawke's Bay United						1													1
55=	(New Zealand) Matthew Ridenton	Wellington Phoenix						1													1
55=	(New Zealand) Andrew Barton	Canterbury United							1												1
55=	(Argentina) Facundo Barbero	Hawke's Bay United							1												1
55=	(New Zealand) Adam Mitchell	Wanderers SC							1												1
55=	(New Zealand) Patrick Fleming	Team Wellington							1												1
55=	(United States) Sean Morris	Team Wellington							1												1
55=	(France) Nicolas Bechar	Team Wellington							1												1
55=	(New Zealand) Angus Kilkolly	Wanderers SC								1											1
55=	(New Zealand) Thomas Connor	Southern United								1											1
55=	(New Zealand) Jacob Butler	Waitakere United									1										1
55=	(Australia) Josh Brindall-South	Wellington Phoenix										1									1
55=	(New Zealand) Wade Molony	WaiBOP United										1									1
55=	(New Zealand) Ashley Wellbourn	Canterbury United										1									1
55=	(New Zealand) Stuart Holthusen	Wanderers SC										1									1
55=	(New Zealand) Jason Hicks	Wellington Phoenix											1								1
55=	(New Zealand) Ryan Stanley	Canterbury United											1								1
55=	(New Zealand) Jake Porter	Waitakere United												1							1
55=	(New Zealand) Fin Milne	Hawke's Bay United												1							1
55=	(New Zealand) William McIntyre	Southern United													1						1
55=	(New Zealand) Alec Solomons	Waitakere United													1						1
55=	(Wales) Chris Bale	Waitakere United													1						1
55=	(New Zealand) Thomas Doyle	Wellington Phoenix													1						1
55=	(New Zealand) Van Elia	WaiBOP United													1						1
55=	(New Zealand) Alex Rufer	Wellington Phoenix														1					1
55=	(England) John Irving	Auckland City FC														1					1
55=	(New Zealand) Alex Palezevic	Hawke's Bay United														1					1
55=	(England) Mark Peers	Canterbury United															1				1
55=	(New Zealand) Dan Terris	Canterbury United																1			1
55=	(New Zealand) Andrew Blake	Wellington Phoenix																1			1
55=	(New Zealand) Cheauxyan Maukau-McPhee	Wanderers SC																1			1
55=	(New Zealand) Xavier Pratt	Wellington Phoenix																	1		1
55=	(New Zealand) Robbie Greenhalgh	WaiBOP United																		1	1
55=	(New Zealand) Jarrod Young	WaiBOP United																		1	1
55=	(New Zealand) Tim McLennan	Southern United																		1	1

Goal scored from penalty kick Two goals were scored from penalty kicks Team had a bye in this round

*Goals were scored in matches that were rescheduled.

=== Own goals ===
Player	Team	Opposition	Round
(New Zealand) Harry Morton	Hawke's Bay United	Auckland City	1
(New Zealand) Brock Messenger	Wanderers SC	Wellington Phoenix	2
(New Zealand) Gowan Stares	Wanderers SC	Hawke's Bay United	3
(New Zealand) Benjudah Fitzpatrick	Southern United	Auckland City	13

=== Discipline ===
The 'total' column is based on 1 point for a yellow card, 2 points for two yellows equalling red, and 3 points for a straight red card.
As of end of round 3, 16 November 2014

Team	Yellow card	Second yellow card	Red card	Total
Auckland City	6	0	0	6
Hawke's Bay United	5	0	0	5
Team Wellington	6	0	0	6
Waitakere United	5	0	0	5
Wanderers SC	5	0	0	5
WaiBOP United	0	0	1	3
Wellington Phoenix	1	1	0	3
Canterbury United	3	0	0	3
Southern United	1	0	0	1
