= Alex Rodríguez (Spanish footballer) =

Spanish footballer

Personal information
- Full name: Alejandro Rodríguez Gorrín
- Date of birth: 1 August 1993 (age 33)
- Place of birth: Tenerife, Spain
- Height: 1.77 m (5 ft 10 in)
- Position: Attacking midfielder

Team information
- Current team: Linfield
- Number: 6

Youth career
- –2009: Tenerife
- 2009–2014: Sunderland

Senior career*
Years	Team	Apps	(Gls)
2014–2017	Wellington Phoenix	72	(1)
2014	Wellington Phoenix Reserves	1	(0)
2017	Boavista	0	(0)
2018	Sepsi	12	(0)
2018–2019	Motherwell	20	(0)
2019–2024	Oxford United	89	(1)
2024	Forest Green Rovers	3	(0)
2025–	Linfield	9	(0)
- * Club domestic league appearances and goals as of 22 February 2026

Alejandro Rodríguez Gorrín (born 1 August 1993), also known as Alex Rodríguez, is a Spanish professional footballer who plays as a central midfielder for NIFL club Linfield.

Rodríguez was born in Tenerife and played youth football with Sunderland before starting his professional career with Wellington Phoenix.

== Early life ==
Gorrín was born in Tenerife.

== Career ==
Rodríguez was a member of Premier League club Sunderland's youth system for several years, including as captain of the youth team. After being released by Sunderland in 2014, Rodríguez signed with New Zealand-based A-League club Wellington Phoenix. In July 2014, Rodríguez scored his first Phoenix goal in a pre-season friendly win over Premier League side West Ham United after earlier setting up the opening goal. Alex made his competitive debut for Wellington in the side's loss to Perth Glory in the opening round of the 2014–15 A-League.

On 6 June 2017, Rodríguez signed with Portuguese club Boavista.

After a spell with Romanian club Sepsi, Rodríguez signed for Scottish Premiership club Motherwell in June 2018.

On 20 June 2019, Rodríguez signed a two-year contract with Oxford United, with the option of a third, on a free transfer after his Motherwell deal had expired. He made his Oxford debut in a 1–1 draw at Sunderland on the opening day of the 2019–20 season. Rodríguez scored his first goal for Oxford United on 24 November 2020, scoring from the penalty spot to secure a 1–1 draw with Portsmouth. He signed a new one-year deal at the end of the 2021–22 season, having missed the second half of the season with a knee injury. After his contract expired at the end of the 2022–23 season, Rodriguez continued to train with the Oxford United first team while recovering from his injury, playing two behind-closed-doors games, before being offered a short-term contract on 20 October.

On 12 January 2024, Rodríguez signed for League Two club Forest Green Rovers on a permanent deal. He was sent off on his debut, a 2–0 home defeat to Harrogate Town. He was released following relegation at the end of the 2023–24 season.

== Career statistics ==
As of end of 2023–24 season

Appearances and goals by club, season and competition
Club	Season	League			National cup		League cup		Other		Total	
Club	Season	Division	Apps	Goals	Apps	Goals	Apps	Goals	Apps	Goals	Apps	Goals
Wellington Phoenix	2014–15	A-League	25	0	0	0	0	0	0	0	25	0
Wellington Phoenix	2015–16	A-League	24	0	0	0	0	0	0	0	24	0
Wellington Phoenix	2016–17	A-League	23	1	0	0	0	0	0	0	23	1
Wellington Phoenix	Total		72	1	0	0	0	0	0	0	72	1
Wellington Phoenix Reserves	2014–15	New Zealand Football Championship	1	0	0	0	0	0	0	0	1	0
Boavista	2017–18	Primeira Liga	0	0	0	0	0	0	0	0	0	0
Sepsi	2017–18	Liga I	12	0	0	0	0	0	0	0	12	0
Motherwell	2018–19	Scottish Premiership	20	0	1	0	3	0	1 (Note: Appearances in the Scottish Challenge Cup, in which age-restricted teams from the Scottish Premiership clubs compete against senior clubs)	0	25	0
Oxford United	2019–20	League One	31	0	5	0	2	0	6 (Note: Three appearances in the Football League Trophy and three in the League One play-offs)	0	44	0
Oxford United	2020–21	League One	35	1	0	0	1	0	4 (Note: Three appearances in the Football League Trophy and one in the League One play-offs)	0	40	1
Oxford United	2021–22	League One	13	0	1	0	2	0	1 (Note: Appearances in the EFL Trophy)	0	17	0
Oxford United	2022–23	League One	8	0	1	0	1	1	3	0	13	1
Oxford United	2023–24	League One	1	0	0	0	0	0	1	0	2	0
Oxford United	Total		88	1	7	0	6	1	15	0	116	2
Forest Green Rovers	2023–24	League Two	3	0	0	0	0	0	0	0	3	0
Career total			196	2	8	0	9	1	16	0	229	3

== See also ==
- List of foreign A-League players
- List of Wellington Phoenix FC players
