= Te Atawhai Hudson-Wihongi =

New Zealand footballer

Personal information
- Full name: Te Atawhai Maurice Hudson-Wihongi
- Date of birth: 27 March 1995 (age 31)
- Place of birth: Auckland, New Zealand
- Height: 1.87 m (6 ft 2 in)
- Position: Midfielder

Team information
- Current team: Walthamstow

Youth career
- –2010: Waitakere City
- 2010–2012: Asia–Pacific Football Academy
- 2011–2012: Canterbury United
- 2012–2014: Real Salt Lake

Senior career*
Years	Team	Apps	(Gls)
2011–2012	Canterbury United	1	(0)
2014–2015	Wanderers SC	16	(2)
2015–2019	Auckland City	47	(0)
2019–2021	Wellington Phoenix	15	(0)
2019–2021	→ Wellington Phoenix Reserves	3	(0)
2021–2022	Auckland United	7	(2)
2022–	Walthamstow	50	(0)

International career^{‡}
2015	New Zealand U-20	5	(0)
2015–	New Zealand U-23	3	(1)
2015–2019	New Zealand	8	(0)
- * Club domestic league appearances and goals as of 13:00, 4 October 2022 ‡ National team caps and goals as of 5 January 2019

Te Atawhai Maurice Hudson-Wihongi (born 27 March 1995) is a New Zealand footballer who currently plays for Isthmian League North Division club Walthamstow. He has also played for the New Zealand national football team.

== Career ==
Following a short stint at Canterbury United, in which he featured in just one game as a substitute against Waikato FC on 29 January 2012, Hudson-Wihongi signed for United States side Real Salt Lake on a youth contract, appearing for the club's under-18s. Following his departure, Hudson-Wihongi trialed at Scottish club Aberdeen and Italian Serie D club Padova.

After signing for Auckland City FC from the now-defunct Wanderers SC, Hudson-Wihongi scored his first goal in the Charity Cup against Team Wellington. He also represented Auckland City at the 2015 FIFA Club World Cup, and played in their 0–1 loss against hosts Sanfrecce Hiroshima.

In July 2019, Hudson-Wihongi signed a one-year professional contract with Wellington Phoenix.

In October 2022, Hudson-Wihongi moved to England to join Southern Football League Division One South club Walthamstow.

== International career ==
Hudson-Wihongi has represented New Zealand at three different levels of international football. He represented New Zealand at the 2015 FIFA U-20 World Cup, and for the New Zealand national under-23 football team at the 2015 Pacific Games in which he scored in New Zealand's 5–0 win over New Caledonia in the group stage.

Hudson-Wihongi made his full New Zealand debut in a friendly against Oman, coming on as an 80th-minute substitute in the 1–0 win for New Zealand.

== Honors ==
=== National ===
New Zealand

- OFC Nations Cup: 2016

== Career statistics ==
=== Club ===
Appearances and goals by club, season and competition
Club	Season	League			Cup		League Cup		Other		Total	
Club	Season	Division	Apps	Goals	Apps	Goals	Apps	Goals	Apps	Goals	Apps	Goals
Canterbury United	2011–12	NZ Premiership	1	0	—		—		0	0	1	0
Wanderers SC	2014–15	NZ Premiership	16	2	—		—		—		16	2
Auckland City	2015–16	NZ Premiership	11	0	—		—		4	1	15	1
Auckland City	2016–17	NZ Premiership	5	0	—		—		0	0	5	0
Auckland City	2017–18	NZ Premiership	16	0	—		—		8	0	24	0
Auckland City	2018–19	NZ Premiership	10	0	—		—		5	2	15	2
Auckland City	Total				0	0	0	0				
Wellington Phoenix	2019–20	A-League	10	0	1	0	—		1	0	12	0
Wellington Phoenix	2020–21	A-League	4	0	—		—		—		4	0
Wellington Phoenix	Total		14	0	1	0	0	0	1	0	16	0
Wellington Phoenix Reserves	2019–20	NZ Premiership	3	0	—		—		—		3	0
Auckland United	2021	National League	7	2	0	0	—		—		7	2
Auckland United	2022	National League	8	1	0	0	—		—		8	1
Auckland United	Total		15	3	0	0	0	0	0	0	15	3
Enfield Town	2022–23	IL Premier Division	0	0	0	0	0	0	0	0	0	0
Walthamstow	2022–23	SFL Division One Central	19	0	0	0	0	0	1 (Note: Appearances in Essex Senior Cup)	0	20	0
Walthamstow	2023–24	IL North Division	26	0	0	0	1	0	3 (Note: One appearance in FA Trophy; one appearance in Essex Senior Cup; one appearance in Essex Thameside Trophy)	0	30	0
Walthamstow	2024–25	IL North Division	19	1	1	0	1	0	2 (Note: One appearance, one goal in FA Trophy; one appearance in Essex Senior Cup)	1	23	2
Walthamstow	2025–26	IL North Division	4	0	0	0	1	0	2 (Note: Appearances in FA Trophy)	0	7	0
Walthamstow	Total		68	0	1	0	3	0	8	1	80	1
Career total												
