= Adam Mitchell (footballer, born 1996) =

Croatian–New Zealand footballer

Personal information
- Full name: Adam Thomas Mitchell
- Date of birth: 1 June 1996 (age 30)
- Place of birth: Vrgorac, Croatia
- Height: 1.90 m (6 ft 3 in)
- Position: Centre-back

Team information
- Current team: Auckland City
- Number: 3

Youth career
- Waitakere City
- 2013: Central United

Senior career*
Years	Team	Apps	(Gls)
2013–2015	Wanderers SC	24	(2)
2015–2016	WaiBOP United	10	(0)
2016	Red Star Belgrade	0	(0)
2016	→ OFK Beograd (loan)	8	(0)
2017	Celje	0	(0)
2017–2018	Bolton Wanderers	0	(0)
2019	Team Wellington	3	(0)
2019–	Auckland City	141	(5)

International career
2013	New Zealand U17	8	(0)
2014–2015	New Zealand U20	5	(0)
2018	New Zealand	4	(0)
- * Club domestic league appearances and goals as of 9 May 2026

Adam Thomas Mitchell (born 1 June 1996) is a professional footballer who plays as a centre-back for National League club Auckland City. Born in Croatia, he represents the New Zealand national team.

== Club career ==
Mitchell was born in Vrgorac, Croatia, to a New Zealand father and Bosnian Croat mother and holds both New Zealand and Croatian citizenship. He grew up in Hobsonville in West Auckland, and began playing for Waitakere City before later moving to Central United (2013), starting as a midfielder before becoming a centre back. He was also a member of Wynton Rufer's Wynrs academy as a youngster.

Mitchell played three seasons in the New Zealand Football Championship, two seasons with Wanderers SC and one with WaiBOP United. Mitchell captained the Wanderers SC team that was formed to give the under-20s regular game time in the NZFC. He was also team-captain at WaiBOP United.

In summer 2016, he moved abroad, to Europe, where after trials, he signed a contract with Serbian giants Red Star Belgrade. He signed on 25 May 2016, a 1+2 years contract with Red Star. Due to his young age, in order to increase his chances to play, at final days of the Serbian 2016 summer transfer-window, he was loaned to OFK Beograd. He debuted with OFK in the 2016–17 Serbian First League on 10 September, in a home game against Inđija, a 1–0 win.

On 13 February 2017, he moved to Slovenian side NK Celje.

In the 2017–18 season he was a regular in the U23 squad of the Football League Championship side Bolton Wanderers. Following his release at the end of the season and a period training with Walsall and Swedish club Kalmar FF, on 12 February 2019 Mitchell signed with New Zealand club Team Wellington until the end of the season.

== International career ==
Mitchell represented New Zealand at U-17 and U-20 levels. He was part of the squad that won the 2013 OFC U-17 Championship, and was part of New Zealand's squad for the 2013 FIFA U-17 World Cup and the 2015 FIFA U-20 World Cup.

Mitchell was called up to the New Zealand national team twice in 2015 under Anthony Hudson as an injury replacement. He made his debut under Fritz Schmid on 24 March 2018 in a friendly game against Canada.

== Career statistics ==
=== Club ===
As of 20 November 2016

Club	Season	League			Cup		Continental		Other		Total	
Club	Season	Division	Apps	Goals	Apps	Goals	Apps	Goals	Apps	Goals	Apps	Goals
Wanderers SC	2013–14	Premiership	12	1	—		—		—		12	1
Wanderers SC	2014–15	Premiership	12	1	—		—		—		12	1
Wanderers SC	Total		24	2	—		—		—		24	2
WaiBOP United	2015–16	Premiership	10	0	—		—		—		10	0
OFK Beograd (loan)	2016–17	First League	8	0	0	0	—		—		8	0
Red Star Belgrade	2016–17	SuperLiga	0	0	0	0	0	0	—		0	0
Career total			42	2	0	0	0	0	—		42	2

== Honours ==
New Zealand U-17

- OFC U-17 Championship: 2013

Auckland City

- OFC Champions League: 2024, 2025
- National League: 2024, 2025
