= Clayton Lewis (footballer) =

New Zealand footballer (born 1997)

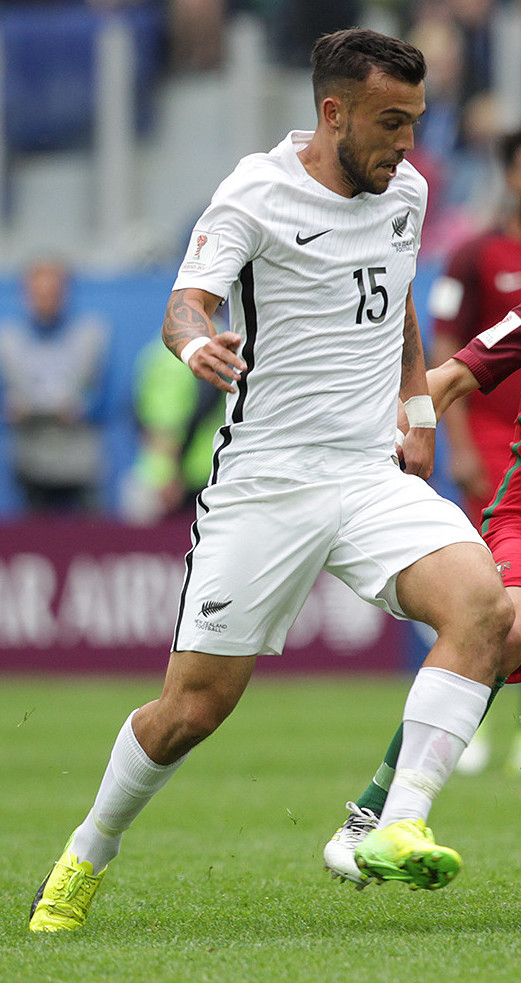
- Lewis playing for New Zealand against Portugal at the 2017 FIFA Confederations Cup

Personal information
- Full name: Clayton Rhys Lewis
- Date of birth: 12 February 1997 (age 29)
- Place of birth: Wellington, New Zealand
- Height: 1.69 m (5 ft 7 in)
- Position: Attacking midfielder

Youth career
- Wellington Olympic

Senior career*
Years	Team	Apps	(Gls)
2013–2014	Team Wellington	0	(0)
2014–2015	Wanderers SC	11	(2)
2015–2017	Auckland City	29	(9)
2016	Onehunga Sports	8	(2)
2017–2019	Scunthorpe United	19	(0)
2019–2020	Auckland City	13	(2)
2020–2023	Wellington Phoenix	63	(3)
2023–2024	Macarthur FC	26	(0)

International career^{‡}
2014–2017	New Zealand U20	12	(4)
2015–2021	New Zealand U23	10	(4)
2015–2024	New Zealand	27	(1)
- * Club domestic league appearances and goals as of 20 September 2024 ‡ National team caps and goals as of 27 March 2024 (UTC)

Clayton Rhys Lewis (born 12 February 1997 in Wellington) is a New Zealand footballer who plays as a midfielder.

== Club career ==
=== Junior and Semi-Professional Career ===
Lewis attended St Patrick's College, Wellington from 2010 until 2014. He began his career with Wellington Olympic where he played alongside his father Barry. Lewis came into prominence in the 2013 winter season where he was a key member of the Wellington Olympic team which finished second in the Central Premier League and reached the semifinals of the Chatham Cup. This exposure led his to being signed by Team Wellington for the 2013–14 ASB Premiership season. However, he did not make an appearance for Team Wellington.

On 1 July 2014 he was signed on a free transfer by Wanderers SC. Lewis made his debut on 22 November 2014 on the fifth match of the season away at WaiBOP United in a 3–0 win in which he scored. He would go on to make 11 appearances, score 3 goals and assist another 3 for the Wanderers that season before joining reigning champions Auckland City.

In 2016, Lewis served a one month ban for an anti-doping rule violation after testing positive for unintentionally elevated levels of salbutamol derived from the use of his asthma medication.

On 28 September 2017, Lewis signed a contract with League One club Scunthorpe United. Following minimal playing time over the three seasons he spent at Scunthorpe, Lewis' contract was terminated by mutual consent and he returned to Auckland City on 4 November 2019.

=== Wellington Phoenix ===
Lewis signed a one-year deal with A-League club Wellington Phoenix in October 2020. On 18 May 2021, his contract was extended for an additional two years. In March 2022, Lewis was ruled out for 12 weeks with an ankle injury obtained during a match against Perth Glory.

In March 2023, ahead of Wellington's round 19 fixture, it was announced that Lewis would depart Wellington at the end of the 2022-23 A-League season. Lewis went on to make 69 appearances across all competitions for Wellington, in his three seasons at the club.

=== Macarthur FC ===
3 days after Wellington Phoenix's season ended in an elimination final defeat to Adelaide United, Macarthur FC announced the signing of Lewis on a two-year contract.

== Betting scandal and sentencing ==
On 17 May 2024, Lewis, along with Macarthur FC teammates Kearyn Baccus and Ulises Dávila, was arrested and charged by the New South Wales Police Force in connection with alleged spot-fixing during the 2023–24 A-League Men season. Police alleged that club captain Dávila had received instructions from a South American associate to manipulate the number of yellow cards shown in four matches. It was further alleged that he paid Lewis and another player A$10,000 each to participate in the scheme.

Football Australia issued a no-fault suspension, preventing Lewis from participating in domestic football activities while the criminal proceedings were ongoing. Following the guilty plea, it was revealed that Football Australia had issued Lewis with a show cause notice in relation to a potential lifetime ban from the sport.

In September 2025, Lewis was sentenced at Sydney’s Downing Centre Local Court to a two-year conditional release order after pleading guilty to engaging in conduct that corrupts a betting outcome. Court documents stated that he intentionally received a yellow card in Macarthur FC’s match against Sydney FC on 9 December 2023 as part of the scheme. He was ordered to pay a A$10,000 pecuniary penalty and to undergo psychiatric treatment for gambling addiction and depression.

== International career ==
Lewis made his international debut for New Zealand on 31 March 2015 against South Korea, playing 54 minutes in a 1–0 defeat.

He has also made several appearances for the New Zealand under-20 team starting in April 2015. He is part of the under-20 side for the 2015 FIFA U-20 World Cup in New Zealand. He scored his first FIFA U-20 World Cup goal against Myanmar in a 5–1 group stage win at Westpac Stadium in Wellington.

In the 2017 FIFA Confederations Cup, Lewis assisted Chris Wood's goal against Mexico to put New Zealand up 1–0 in Sochi; this was New Zealand's only goal in the competition.

On 25 June 2021, Lewis was called up to the New Zealand squad for the delayed 2020 Summer Olympics.

During New Zealand's 4–0 victory against Fiji at the 2022 FIFA World Cup qualifiers, Lewis converted a penalty kick to score his first international goal.

== International goals ==
No.	Date	Venue	Opponent	Score	Result	Competition
1.	21 March 2022	Suheim bin Hamad Stadium, Doha, Qatar	Fiji	4–0	4–0	2022 FIFA World Cup qualification
