= Andre de Jong =

New Zealand footballer (born 1996)

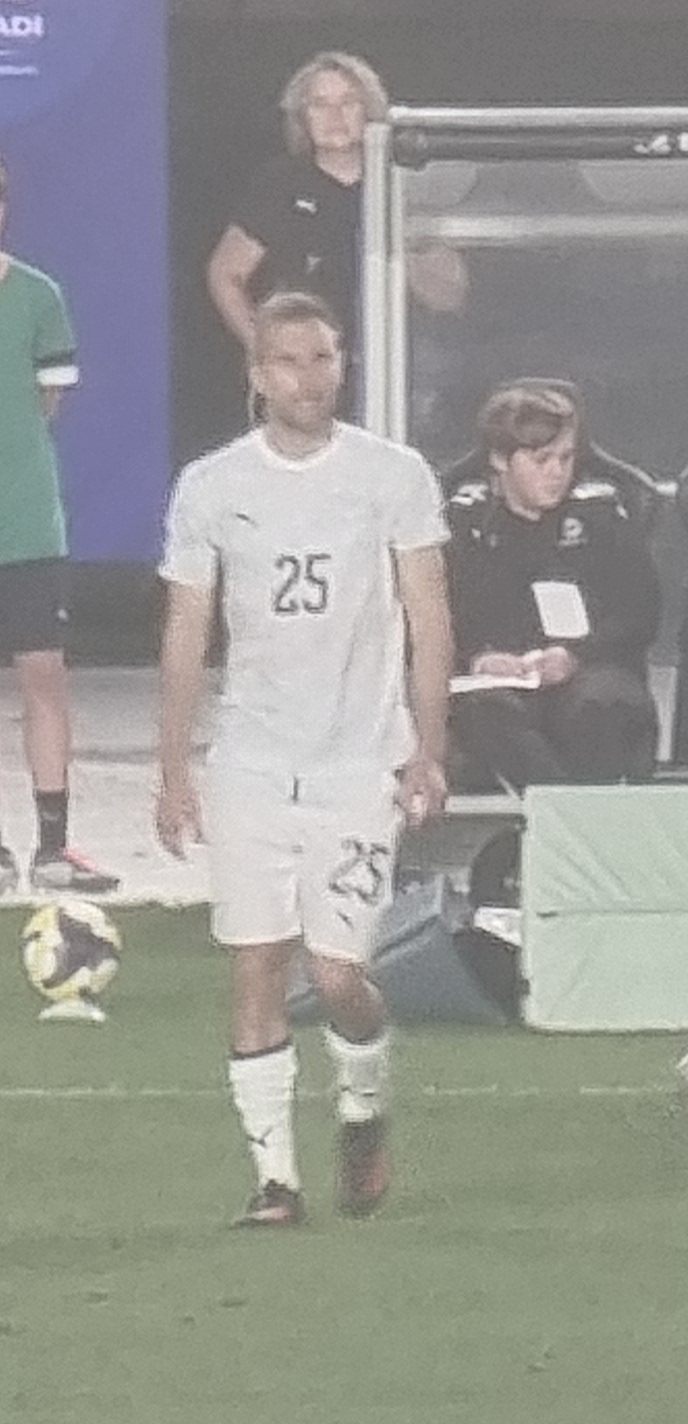
- De Jong playing for the All Whites in March 2026.

Personal information
- Full name: Andre Ernest de Jong
- Date of birth: 2 November 1996 (age 30)
- Place of birth: Ōtorohanga, New Zealand
- Height: 1.81 m (5 ft 11 in)
- Position: Forward

Team information
- Current team: Orlando Pirates
- Number: 18

Senior career*
Years	Team	Apps	(Gls)
2013–2015	Wanderers SC	30	(7)
2015–2016	Canterbury United	15	(7)
2016	Maccabi Hakoah	18	(4)
2016–2017	Canterbury United	17	(5)
2017	Maccabi Hakoah	22	(6)
2017–2018	Eastern Suburbs	16	(11)
2018	Maccabi Hakoah	17	(4)
2018–2019	Eastern Suburbs	20	(17)
2019	APIA Leichhardt	7	(1)
2019–2022	AmaZulu	32	(0)
2022–2023	Royal AM	9	(3)
2023–2025	Stellenbosch	72	(5)
2026–	Orlando Pirates	5	(0)

International career^{‡}
2018–	New Zealand	10	(2)
- * Club domestic league appearances and goals as of 4 January 2026 ‡ National team caps and goals as of 31 March 2022

Andre Ernest de Jong (born 2 November 1996) is a New Zealand professional footballer who plays as a forward for South African Premiership club Orlando Pirates and the New Zealand national team.

== Personal life ==
De Jong is of Dutch descent through his paternal grandparents. He is the son of former New Zealand striker, Fred de Jong.

== Career statistics ==
=== Club ===
Club	Season	League			Cup		League Cup		Continental		Other		Total	
Club	Season	Division	Apps	Goals	Apps	Goals	Apps	Goals	Apps	Goals	Apps	Goals	Apps	Goals
Wanderers SC	2013–14	NZ Premiership	14	2	—		—		—		—		14	2
Wanderers SC	2014–15	NZ Premiership	16	4	—		—		—		—		16	4
Wanderers SC	Total		30	6	0	0	0	0	0	0	0	0	30	6
Canterbury United	2015–16	NZ Premiership	14	7	—		—		—		1 (Note: Appearances in New Zealand Football Championship play-offs)	0	15	7
Canterbury United	2016–17	NZ Premiership	17	5	—		—		—		—		17	5
Canterbury United	Total		31	12	0	0	0	0	0	0	1	0	32	12
Maccabi Hakoah	2017	NPL NSW	22	6	—		—		—		—		22	6
Eastern Suburbs	2017–18	NZ Premiership	16	12	—		—		—		—		16	12
Maccabi Hakoah	2018	NPL NSW	17	4	1	0	—		—		—		18	4
Eastern Suburbs	2018–19	NZ Premiership	18	16	—		—		—		2	1	20	17
APIA Leichhardt	2019	NPL NSW	7	1	—		—		—		—		7	1
AmaZulu	2019–20	SA Premiership	11	0	0	0	1	0	—		—		12	0
AmaZulu	2020–21	SA Premiership	2	0	0	0	0	0	—		—		2	0
AmaZulu	2021–22	SA Premiership	19	0	0	0	0	0	1 (Note: Appearances in CAF Champions League)	0	0	0	20	0
AmaZulu	Total		32	0	0	0	1	0	1	0	0	0	34	0
Royal AM	2022–23	SA Premiership	9	3	0	0	0	0	3 (Note: Appearances in CAF Confederation Cup)	0	1 (Note: Appearances in MTN 8)	0	13	3
Stellenbosch	2022–23	SA Premiership	8	0	3	1	0	0	—		—		11	1
Stellenbosch	2023–24	SA Premiership	25	2	4	3	2	1	—		3	1	34	7
Stellenbosch	2024–25	SA Premiership	25	1	3	1	2	1	13	4	4	1	47	8
Stellenbosch	2025–26	SA Premiership	14	2	0	0	2	0	2	1	4	0	22	3
Stellenbosch	Total		72	5	10	5	6	2	15	5	11	2	114	19
Orlando Pirates	2025–26	SA Premiership	5	0	2	1	—		—		—		7	1
Career total														

=== International ===
Scores and results list New Zealand's goal tally first.

List of international goals scored by Andre de Jong
No.	Date	Venue	Opponent	Score	Result	Competition
1.	7 June 2018	Mumbai Football Arena, Mumbai, India	India	1–1	2–1	2018 Intercontinental Cup
2.	24 March 2022	Qatar SC Stadium, Doha, Qatar	New Caledonia	4–1	7–1	2022 FIFA World Cup qualification
