= Andrew Blake (footballer) =

New Zealand footballer

Personal information
- Full name: Andrew Tennant Blake
- Date of birth: 14 March 1996 (age 30)
- Place of birth: New Zealand
- Height: 1.81 m (5 ft 11 in)
- Position: Right-back

Team information
- Current team: Auckland City FC
- Number: 17

Youth career
- 2013–2014: Team Wellington

Senior career*
Years	Team	Apps	(Gls)
2014–2016	Wellington Phoenix Reserves	24	(3)
2015–2016	Wellington Phoenix	0	(0)
2016	→ Hawke's Bay United (loan)	4	(0)
2016–2017	Eastern Suburbs	15	(0)
2017–2019	Hibernian	0	(0)
2017–2018	→ Edinburgh City (loan)	7	(0)
2019–	Auckland City FC	11	(0)

International career^{‡}
2013	New Zealand U17	4	(1)
2015	New Zealand U20	3	(0)
- * Club domestic league appearances and goals as of 05:59, 8 February 2020 (UTC) ‡ National team caps and goals as of 28 August 2015

Andrew Tennant Blake (born 14 March 1996) is a professional New Zealand footballer who plays for Auckland City FC.

On 26 August 2015, he made his professional senior debut for Wellington Phoenix in the 2015 FFA Cup against Melbourne City. On 12 February 2016, following Hamish Watson joining Phoenix from Hawke's Bay United as an injury replacement, Blake was loaned out to Hawke's Bay United for the remainder of the season.

After a trial spell with Inverness Caledonian Thistle, Blake signed for Hibernian during the summer of 2017. He was then loaned to Edinburgh City in August 2017, but this deal was curtailed in January 2018 as Blake had suffered a long-term injury.

In September 2019, Blake joined Auckland City FC.

== Personal life ==
His older brother Hugh is a rugby union player.

== Career statistics ==
As of 13:47, 24 December 2017 (UTC)

Appearances and goals by club, season and competition
Club	Season	League			National Cup		League Cup		Other		Total	
Club	Season	Division	Apps	Goals	Apps	Goals	Apps	Goals	Apps	Goals	Apps	Goals
Wellington Phoenix Reserves	2014–15	NZF Championship	15	1	—		—		—		15	1
Wellington Phoenix Reserves	2015–16	NZF Championship	9	2	—		—		—		9	2
Wellington Phoenix Reserves	Total		24	3	—		—		—		24	3
Wellington Phoenix	2015–16	A-League	—		1	0	—		—		1	0
Hawke's Bay United (loan)	2015–16	NZF Championship	4	0	—		—		—		4	0
Eastern Suburbs	2016–17	NZF Championship	15	0	—		—		—		15	0
Hibernian	2017–18	Scottish Premiership	—		—		—		—		—	
Edinburgh City (loan)	2017–18	Scottish League Two	7	0	1	0	—		—		8	0
Career total			50	3	2	0	—		—		52	3
