= Iván Carril =

Spanish footballer

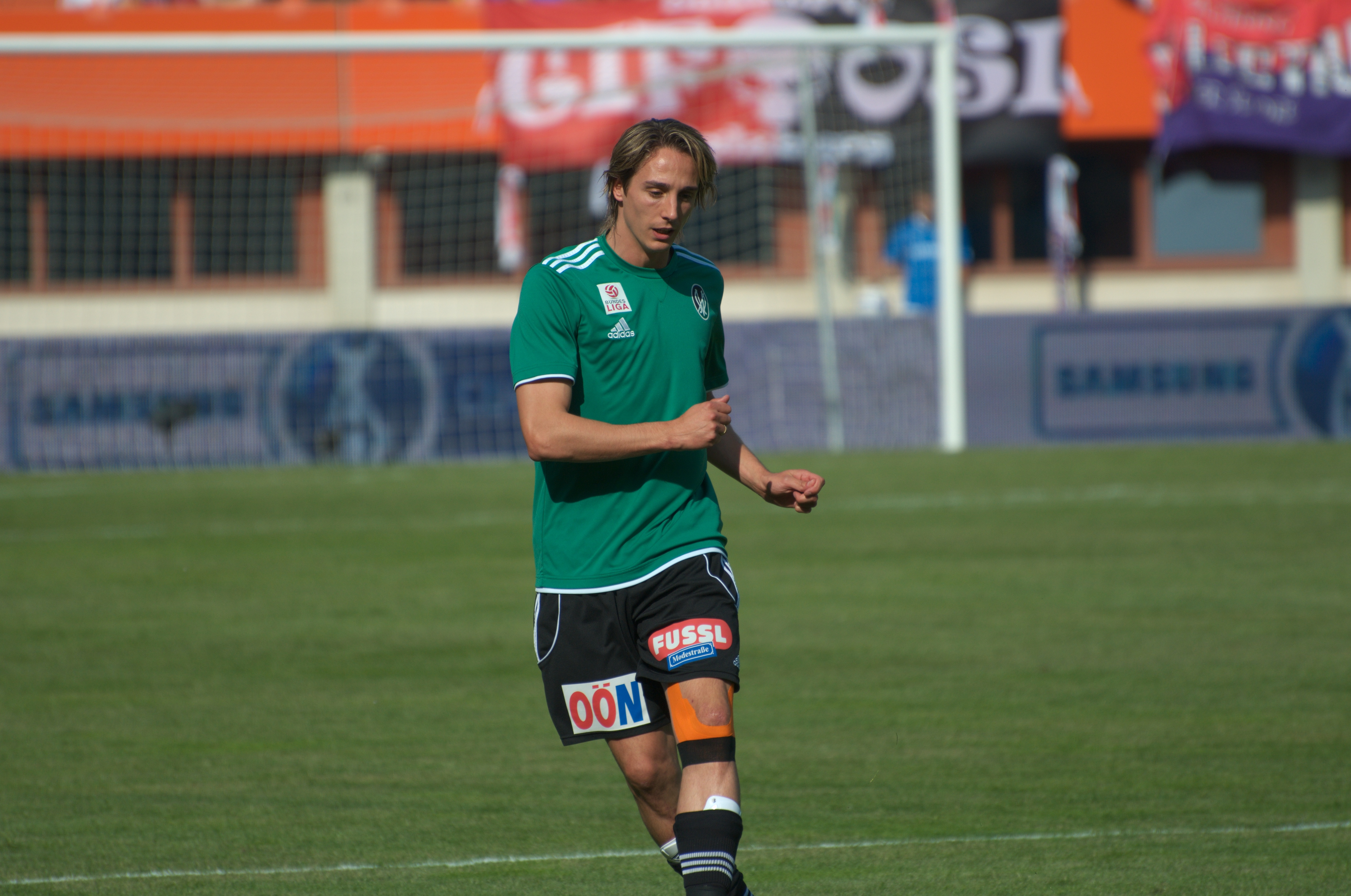
- Carril in 2012

Personal information
- Full name: Iván Carril Regueiro
- Date of birth: 13 February 1985 (age 41)
- Place of birth: Rebordaos, Spain
- Height: 1.82 m (5 ft 11 1/2 in)
- Position: Midfielder

Team information
- Current team: Noia (manager)

Youth career
- 2001–2002: Barcelona

Senior career*
Years	Team	Apps	(Gls)
2002–2009	Deportivo B		
2005–2009	Deportivo La Coruña	10	(1)
2006	→ Vecindario (loan)	8	(0)
2007	→ Palencia (loan)	11	(0)
2009–2010	Pontevedra	32	(2)
2010–2013	Ried	61	(9)
2014	Olympiacos Volos	5	(0)
2014–2015	Hospitalet	11	(0)
2015	Auckland City	6	(4)

Managerial career
- 2019–: Noia
- * Club domestic league appearances and goals

Iván Carril Regueiro (Spanish pronunciation: [iˈβaŋ kaˈril]; born 13 February 1985 in Rebordaos, Santiago de Compostela, Galicia) is a Spanish football manager and former player who played as a midfielder. He is the current manager of CF Noia.

== Football career ==
After a brief spell with FC Barcelona, Carril completed his football grooming at local giants Deportivo de La Coruña. He was mainly registered for several years with the club's B-side, but managed to appear in ten games with the first team, all in the 2005–06 season; his debut came on 28 August 2005 in a 0–1 away win against RCD Mallorca, his only start.

After several loans in the following years (two halves at UD Vecindario and CF Palencia), Carril was released by Depor in 2009 but stayed in Galicia, signing with lowly Pontevedra CF. In summer 2010 he moved to Austria, going on to play three full Bundesliga campaigns with SV Ried; he spent the vast majority of 2012–13 nursing an Achilles tendon ailment, being released at its conclusion.

== Personal life ==
Carril's older brother, Jonathan, was also a footballer. He played, amongst others, with the B-teams of Deportivo and Atlético Madrid.

== Club statistics ==
As of match played on 14 March 2015

Club	Season	League			Cup		Other		Total	
Club	Season	Division	Apps	Goals	Apps	Goals	Apps	Goals	Apps	Goals
Deportivo	2005–06	La Liga	10	1	1	0	4 (Note: Appearances in UEFA Intertoto Cup)	1	15	2
Vecindario (loan)	2006–07	Segunda División	8	0	1	0	—		9	0
Palencia (loan)	2006–07	Segunda División B	11	0	0	0	2 (Note: Appearances in Promotion Playoffs)	0	13	0
Pontevedra	2009–10	Segunda División B	32	2	—		4	0	36	2
SV Ried	2010–11	Austrian Bundesliga	30	5	4	1	—		34	6
SV Ried	2011–12	Austrian Bundesliga	22	4	4	0	4 (Note: Appearances in UEFA Europa League)	0	30	4
SV Ried	2012–13	Austrian Bundesliga	9	0	0	0	2	0	11	0
SV Ried	Total		61	9	8	1	6	0	75	10
Olympiacos Volos	2013–14	Football League	5	0	1	0	—		6	0
Hospitalet	2014–15	Segunda División B	11	0	1	0	—		12	0
Auckland City	2014–15	Championship	6	4	0	0	0	0	6	4
Career total			144	16	12	1	16	1	172	18

== Honours ==
Deportivo B

- Tercera División: 2005–06, 2006–07

Ried

- Austrian Cup: 2010–11
