= Park Island, Napier =

Napier's Stadium

Coordinates: 39.5082°S 176.8569°E

Bluewater Stadium
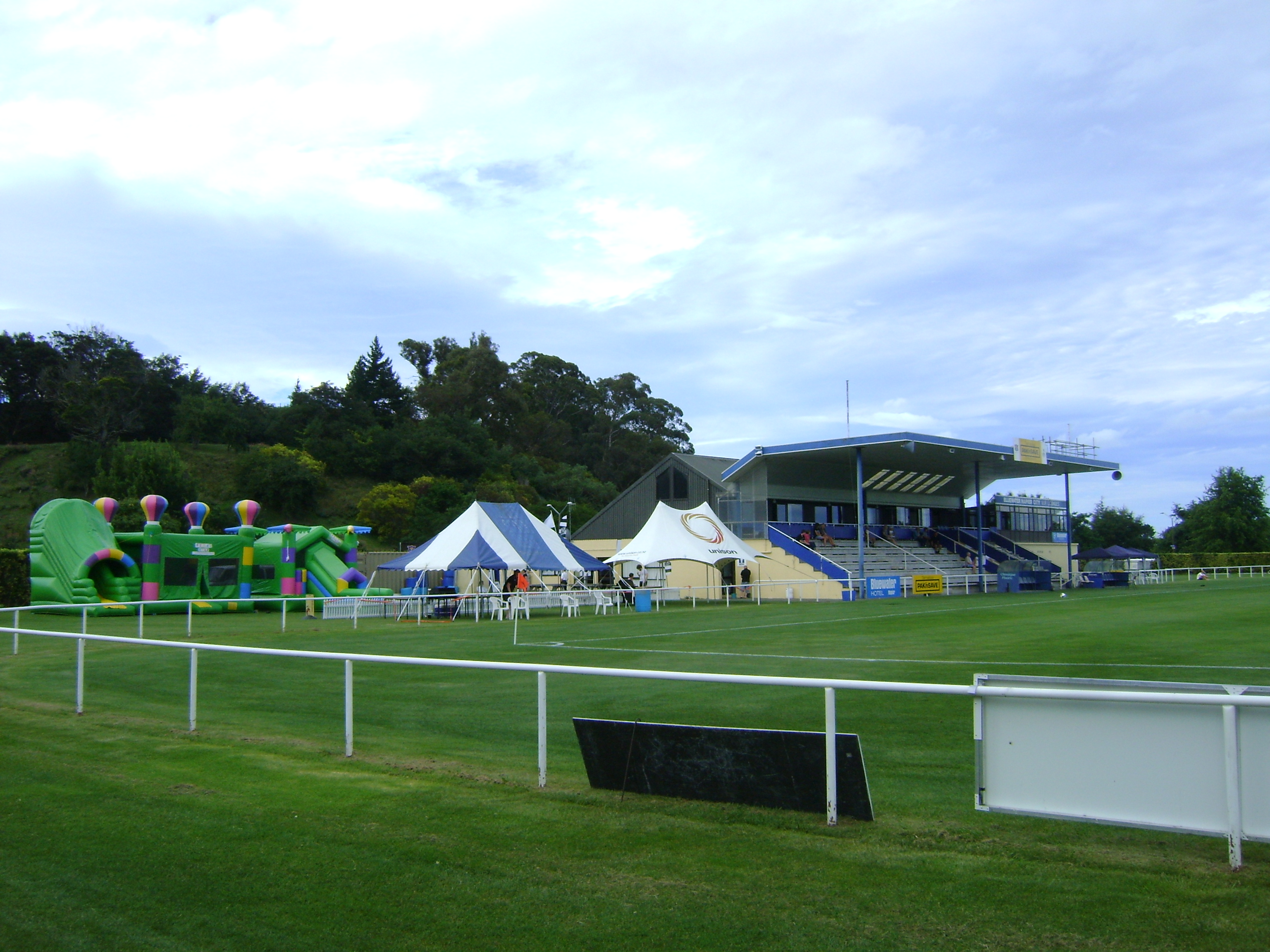
- Interactive map of Bluewater Stadium
- Location: Napier, Hawke's Bay, New Zealand
- Capacity: 5,000
- Surface: Grass

Construction
- Opened: 1985

Tenants
- Napier City Rovers; Hawke's Bay United

Park Island is the largest sports complex in Napier, New Zealand. It hosts clubs and facilities for association football (soccer), cricket, hockey, netball and rugby union. It includes Bluewater Stadium, a multi-purpose stadium that has a capacity of 5,000 people and opened in 1985. The stadium is used mostly for football matches and is the home stadium of Napier City Rovers and Hawke's Bay United. It also served as a training venue for teams in the 2011 Rugby World Cup.

Areas around the park were rezoned in 2016 and 2017 to build a new high-performance rugby facility.
