= Tom Biss =

New Zealand footballer

Personal information
- Full name: Thomas Matthew Biss
- Date of birth: 20 January 1993 (age 33)
- Place of birth: Hastings, New Zealand
- Height: 1.82 m (6 ft 0 in)
- Position: Midfielder

Team information
- Current team: Brunswick City

Senior career*
Years	Team	Apps	(Gls)
2010–2016	Hawke's Bay United	72	(24)
2012–2013	Wellington Phoenix	1	(0)
2012–2013	Team Wellington	12	(4)
2013–2014	Hawke's Bay United	16	(9)
2014–2015	Waitakere United	11	(6)
2015–2016	Hawke's Bay United	15	(4)
2016–2017	Slough Town	3	(0)
2019–2020	Eastern Lions	29	(15)
2021–	Brunswick City	32	(7)

International career^{‡}
2013	New Zealand U20	5	(1)
- * Club domestic league appearances and goals as of 25 November 2022 ‡ National team caps and goals as of 10 September 2012

Thomas Matthew Biss (born 20 January 1993) is a New Zealand footballer who plays as an attacking midfielder for Brunswick City SC.

== Biography ==
In June 2012, Biss was named as one of eight inaugural players to join the Wellington Phoenix academy dubbed the 'Football School of Excellence'. Owing to seven Phoenix players being away on international duty Biss and fellow FSE player Luke Rowe were called on to make their debuts in a Round 2 away fixture versus Melbourne Heart. Despite four players making their debut the Phoenix managed come away with a 1–1 draw, Biss played 87 minutes in midfield.
