= Fabrizio Tavano =

Italo-Mexican footballer (born 1993)

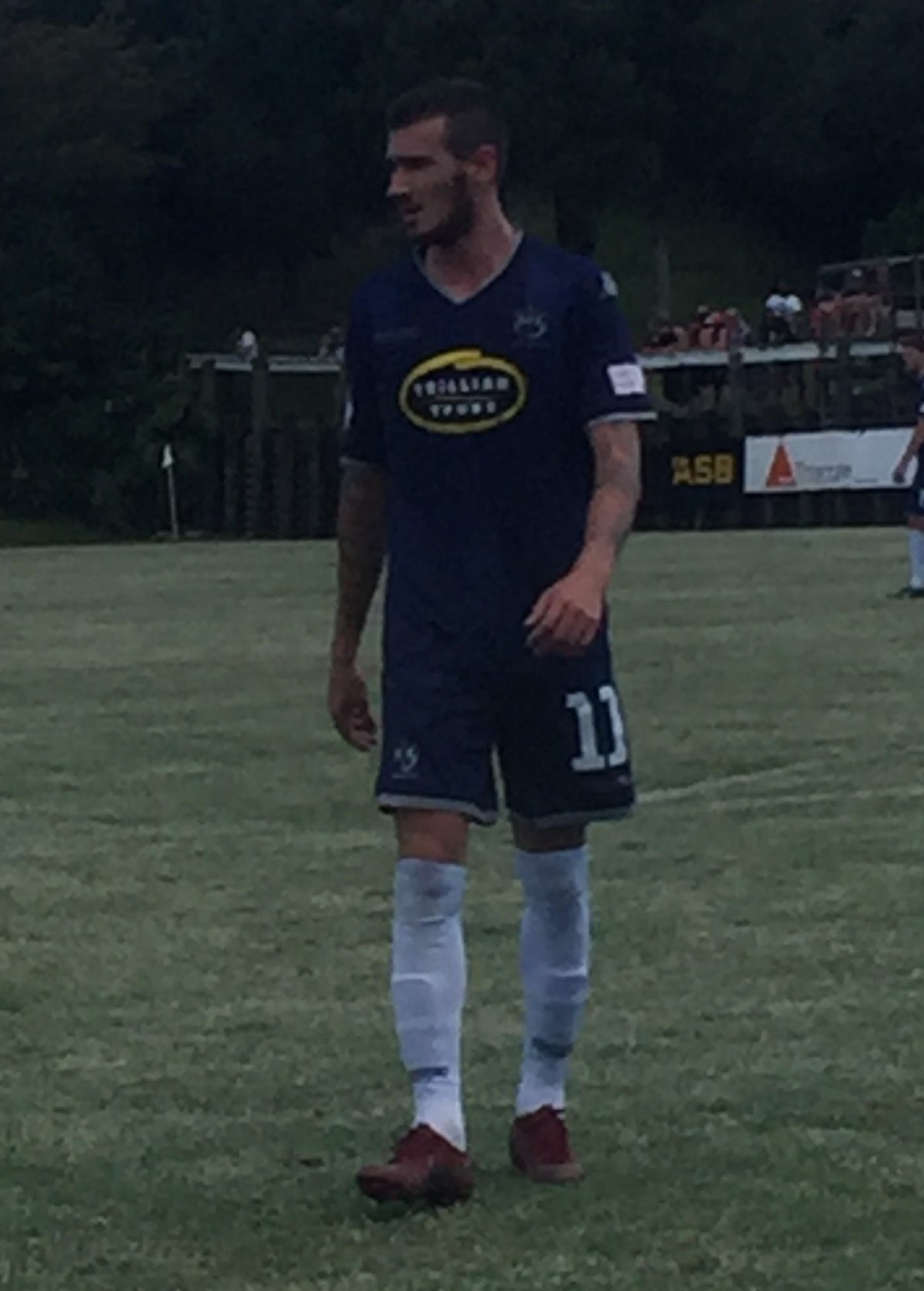
- Tavano playing with Auckland City in 2019

Personal information
- Full name: Enrico Fabrizio Vincenzo Tavano Alonso
- Date of birth: 16 August 1993 (age 33)
- Place of birth: Mexico City, Mexico
- Height: 1.81 m (5 ft 11 in)
- Position: Forward

Youth career
- 2006–2009: Central United
- 2012–2014: Santos Laguna

Senior career*
| Years | Team | Apps | (Gls) |
| 2014–2019 | Auckland City | 52 | (10) |
| 2015 | → Tigres UANL (loan) | 0 | (0) |
| 2019 | Coras de Nayarit | 12 | (5) |
| 2020 | Real Estelí | 14 | (0) |
| 2020 | Halcones de Zapopan | 0 | (0) |
| 2022 | Akron Tolyatti | 0 | (0) |
- * Club domestic league appearances and goals as of 31 December 2020

Enrico Fabrizio Vincenzo Tavano Alonso (born 16 August 1993) is an Italo-Mexican professional footballer who plays as a forward. He also holds New Zealand citizenship.

== Career ==
=== Youth ===
In his teenage years while attending Macleans College in Auckland, New Zealand, Tavano played for the under-15 team of amateur side Central United. In 2008, he participated with Central in the Manchester United Premier Cup, competing against the likes of Juventus and Middlesbrough, and finishing 17th out of a total of 20 teams. Following his performances, Tavano was invited to trial with prestigious European clubs Barcelona and Roma, among others. However, in 2009, Tavano opted to move to Italy with his family, competing at various stages for the Primavera sides of Serie B clubs Vicenza, Pisa and Carpi.

In June 2012, Tavano was signed by Mexican club Santos Laguna and assigned to play with their under-20 side. In February 2013 he participated in the Torneo di Viareggio, a prestigious annual youth tournament held in Italy. Tavano scored the lone goal in Los Guerreros' 2–1 defeat to Parma in their opening match, and featured in the following two games against Rijeka and Genoa as the club were knocked out in the group stage. Before being released by the club in 2014, Tavano won the under-20 2013 Torneo Apertura with Santos, coming on as a substitute in their 1–0 victory in the final against Club León.

=== Auckland City ===
After an unsuccessful trial with Mexican club Atlético San Luis, Tavano returned to New Zealand and signed for reigning New Zealand Football Championship holders Auckland City on a free transfer. He made his debut on 19 October 2014 in the Charity Cup against Team Wellington; a match Auckland lost on penalties after a 2–2 draw. Tavano was included in Auckland's final 25-man squad for the 2014 FIFA Club World Cup, and appeared in all four of his club's games as Auckland City earned a surprise third-place finish at the expense of CONCACAF Champions League winners, Mexican side Cruz Azul. This victory gave Tavano widespread media attention in his homeland.

Tavano's performances during this tournament earned the attention of Mexican powerhouses Tigres UANL, and in February 2015 he eventually signed for their reserve team on loan. However, after limited appearances, Tavano was released at the end of the season, after which he promptly returned to Auckland City. With the Navy Blues, Tavano won the New Zealand Football Championship four times and the OFC Champions League three times. As a result of these Champions League wins, Tavano featured in three subsequent FIFA Club World Cup campaigns.

=== Akron Tolyatti ===
On 25 February 2022, Tavano signed with Russian second-tier FNL club FC Akron Tolyatti, reuniting with his former Auckland City manager Ramon Tribulietx. 5 days later, before he could play in any competitive games for the club, he left Russia, as did Tribulietx, following the Russian invasion of Ukraine.

== Personal life ==
Tavano is the son of Mexican journalist Oreste Tavano, and has Italian heritage through his grandparents. Tavano moved to New Zealand with his family at a young age to follow his father's career.
