= Matthew Ridenton =

New Zealand footballer

Personal information
- Full name: Matthew George Robert Ridenton
- Date of birth: 11 March 1996 (age 30)
- Place of birth: Auckland, New Zealand
- Height: 1.80 m (5 ft 11 in)
- Position: Midfielder

Team information
- Current team: Lions FC
- Number: 6

Youth career
- 2010–2013: Auckland City

Senior career*
Years	Team	Apps	(Gls)
2013	Auckland City		
2013–2018	Wellington Phoenix	73	(4)
2014–2017	Wellington Phoenix Reserves	16	(4)
2018–2020	Newcastle Jets	30	(1)
2020	Brisbane Roar	4	(1)
2020–2021	Wellington Phoenix	8	(0)
2021–	Lions FC	41	(8)

International career^{‡}
2013	New Zealand U-17	7	(0)
2015	New Zealand U-20	9	(1)
2014–	New Zealand	5	(0)
- * Club domestic league appearances and goals as of 31 March 2024 ‡ National team caps and goals as of 8 June 2018

Matthew George Robert Ridenton (born 11 March 1996) is a New Zealand footballer who plays as a midfielder for Lions FC.

== Club career ==
Ridenton played youth football for Three Kings United, Onehunga Sports and Saint Kentigern College, and made his career debut the age of 18 for ISPS Handa Premiership club Auckland City.

Ridenton signed a professional contract at Hyundai A-League side Wellington Phoenix in 2013. After four seasons of sporadic appearances, he broke out in the 2017–18 A-League season, making 26 appearances as the Phoenix finished ninth.

On 9 May 2018, it was announced that Ridenton would move to 2017–18 A-League runners-up Newcastle Jets on a two-year contract, reuniting with former Wellington Phoenix manager Ernie Merrick.

In January 2020, Ridenton joined EFL Championship club Reading for a week-long trial. On 6 November 2020 it was announced that Ridenton had returned to the Phoenix, signing a one-year contract with the club. Following the end of the 2020–21 season, Ridenton departed the club.

== International career ==
In May 2014, Ridenton was called into the All Whites squad by interim coach Neil Emblen for a friendly match against South Africa.

== Honours ==
=== Country ===
New Zealand

- OFC Nations Cup: 2016
