= Nathaniel Hailemariam =

New Zealand footballer (born 1994)

Personal information
- Date of birth: 8 March 1994 (age 32)
- Place of birth: Khartoum, Sudan
- Height: 1.84 m (6 ft 0 in)
- Position: Forward

Team information
- Current team: Petone

Senior career*
| Years | Team | Apps | (Gls) |
| 2013–2014 | Hawke's Bay United | 12 | (2) |
| 2014–2015 | Wellington Phoenix Reserves | 14 | (9) |
| 2015–2016 | Auckland City | 7 | (0) |
| 2016 | 1. FC Rielasingen-Arlen | | |
| 2017–2020 | Team Wellington | 63 | (10) |
| 2021–2023 | Wellington Olympic | 41 | (0) |
| 2024– | Petone | 13 | (0) |
- * Club domestic league appearances and goals as of 30 August 2024

Nathaniel Hailemariam (born 8 March 1994) is a New Zealand footballer who plays as a forward for Petone.

== Early life ==
Hailemariam was born on 8 March 1994 in Khartoum, Sudan. Born to a nurse mother and an engineer father, he moved with his family to Auckland, New Zealand at the age of one and has a younger sister who was born in the city. Growing up, he attended St Peter's College in New Zealand and he left school in 2012.

== Career ==
Hailemariam started his career with New Zealand side Hawke's Bay United in 2013. One year later, he signed for New Zealand side Wellington Phoenix Reserves. In 2015 he signed for New Zealand side Auckland City, where he played at the FIFA Club World Cup.

Subsequently, he signed for German side 1. FC Rielasingen-Arlen in 2016. Following his stint there, he signed for New Zealand side Team Wellington in 2017, helping the club win two league titles and the 2018 OFC Champions League. Ahead of the 2022 season, he signed for New Zealand side Wellington Olympic, helping the club win the league title. The next year, he signed for New Zealand side Petone.

== Style of play ==
Hailemariam plays as a forward and is left-footed. While playing for Hawke's Bay United, New Zealand newspaper Hawke's Bay Today wrote that he "comes off the bench as an impact player".
