= Joel Stevens =

New Zealand footballer

Personal information
- Full name: Joel Craig Stevens
- Date of birth: 7 February 1995 (age 31)
- Place of birth: Dunedin, New Zealand
- Height: 1.74 m (5 ft 8 1/2 in)
- Position: Striker

Team information
- Current team: Christchurch United

Youth career
- –2011: Southern United

Senior career*
Years	Team	Apps	(Gls)
2011–2013	Southern United	17	(3)
2013–2014	Team Wellington	13	(5)
2014	Waitakere United	0	(0)
2014–2016	Wellington Phoenix II	21	(10)
2015–2016	Wellington Phoenix	5	(0)
2016–2018	→ Team Wellington (loan)	37	(13)
2018	Husqvarna FF	20	(3)
2019	Team Wellington	5	(1)
2019	Southern United	8	(6)
2020–2021	IFK Värnamo	47	(6)
2022	Oskarshamns AIK	25	(1)
2023	Wellington Olympic	23	(9)
2024–	Christchurch United	18	(19)

International career^{‡}
2013–2015	New Zealand U-20	2	(1)
2014–2015	New Zealand	3	(0)
- * Club domestic league appearances and goals as of 6 December 2024 ‡ National team caps and goals as of 20 March 2015

Joel Craig Stevens (born 7 February 1995) is a New Zealand footballer who plays as a striker for Swedish club Oskarshamns AIK.

== Club career ==
In March 2018, Joel joined Husqvarna FF who play in Division 1 Södra in Sweden.

In November 2019, Stevens returned home to Dunedin to play again for his Youth club Southern United in the ISPS Handa Premiership

In March 2020, Stevens joined Swedish club IFK Värnamo in Division 1 Södra.

== Honours ==
Individual

- Steve Sumner Trophy: 2023
