= Josh Brindell-South =

Australian soccer player

Personal information
- Full name: Josh Brindell-South
- Date of birth: 28 October 1992 (age 34)
- Place of birth: Brisbane, Australia
- Height: 1.84 m (6 ft 0 in)
- Position: Left back

Senior career*
Years	Team	Apps	(Gls)
2013	Moreton Bay United	12	(3)
2013–2015	Wellington Phoenix	4	(0)
2014–2015	Wellington Phoenix Reserves	10	(1)
2015	Lions FC	3	(0)
2016	Bentleigh Greens	24	(1)
2017	Green Gully	19	(0)
2018–2020	Lions FC	66	(5)
2020–2023	Brisbane Roar	43	(3)
2023–2024	Lions FC	9	(0)
2024–	Eastern Suburbs	11	(0)
- * Club domestic league appearances and goals as of 28 August 2024

Josh Brindell-South (born 1992) is an Australian footballer who plays as a left back. He is currently a free agent, having most recently played for A-League club Brisbane Roar.

== Playing career ==
=== Wellington Phoenix ===
Brindell-South signed a one-year contract with the Phoenix and new coach Ernie Merrick in September 2013. He made three appearances for the club in 2013–14, including two starts. He suffered a season-ending injury to his ankle in a 1–1 home draw with the Perth Glory on 9 March 2014.

=== Brisbane Roar ===
In October 2020, Brindell-South joined Queensland's A-League club, Brisbane Roar. He spent three seasons at Brisbane before being released.
