= Wanderers Special Club =

Wanderers SC
- Full name: Wanderers Special Club
- Founded: 2013
- Dissolved: 2015
- Ground: QBE Stadium
- Coordinates: 36.72684°S 174.70155°E
- Owner: New Zealand Football
- Head coach: Darren Bazeley
- League: ASB Premiership
- 2014–15: 7th

Wanderers Special Club (often abbreviated as Wanderers SC) were a football club based in Auckland, New Zealand.

== Club overview ==
The team was age-restricted, and featured only players below 20 years of age. The club was formed to develop players for the New Zealand national under-20 football team in preparation for the then up-coming 2015 FIFA U-20 World Cup, hosted in New Zealand. New Zealand Football High Performance Director Fred de Jong said that "one of the objectives is to retain our top young players in New Zealand for longer, and entry into the ASB Premiership gives us an opportunity to prepare in a cost effective manner when compared to touring the team internationally."

The club is considered to be a continuation of Northern-Based, an under-17 team that played in the ASB Youth League and provided several players to New Zealand for the 2013 OFC U-17 Championship.

The team entered the 2013–14 ASB Premiership season, replacing outgoing YoungHeart Manawatu.

The team was withdrawn from the ASB Premiership after the 2014–15 season concluded.

== Players ==
Young players who were in the Wanderers squad included the following (with position and previous club):

- Angus Kilkolly (Striker - Auckland City)
- Cory Brown (Defender - Island Bay United)
- Judd Baker (Forward - East Coast Bays)
- Nathan Buswell (Forward - Birkenhead United)
- Andre de Jong (Midfield - Ellerslie)
- Moses Dyer (Midfield/Forward)
- Michael den Heijer (Midfield - Onehunga Sports)
- Damian Hirst - (Goalkeeper - Western Springs)
- Stuart Holthusen (Forward - Onehunga Sports)
- Riley Kelliher (Defender - Island Bay United)
- Clayton Lewis (Midfield - Wellington Olympic AFC/Team Wellington FC)
- Adam Mitchell (Defender - Central United)
- Elijah Neblett (Forward - Birkenhead United)
- Reilly O'Meagher (Defender - Glenfield Rovers)
- Monty Patterson (Forward - Eastern Suburbs)
- Logan Rogerson (Wing)
- Oliver Sail (Goalkeeper)
- Nick Sugden (Midfield - Onehunga Sports)
- Benjamin Thomas (Midfield - Three Kings United),
- Deklan Wynne (Defender, East Coast Bays)
