= Jason Hicks =

New Zealand footballer

Personal information
- Full name: Jason Thomas Hicks
- Date of birth: 16 January 1990 (age 36)
- Place of birth: Gravesend, England
- Height: 1.68 m (5 ft 6 in)
- Position: Defensive midfielder

Team information
- Current team: West Coast Rangers
- Number: 10

Youth career
- –2009: Waitakere United

Senior career*
| Years | Team | Apps | (Gls) |
| 2009–2010 | Waitakere United | 1 | (0) |
| 2010–2012 | WaiBop United | 25 | (7) |
| 2012–2013 | Auckland City | 18 | (6) |
| 2012–2013 | Sunshine Coast | 20 | (11) |
| 2013 | Team Wellington | 2 | (1) |
| 2013–2015 | Wellington Phoenix | 42 | (2) |
| 2013–2015 | Wellington Phoenix Res. | 5 | (1) |
| 2016 | South Melbourne | 0 | (0) |
| 2016–2017 | Melbourne Knights | 47 | (11) |
| 2018 | Bentleigh Greens | 14 | (5) |
| 2018 | Green Gully | 11 | (4) |
| 2019 | Glenfield Rovers | 1 | (0) |
| 2020 | Albany United | 7 | (7) |
| 2021 | West Coast Rangers | 18 | (3) |
| 2022– | Albany United | 14 | (3) |

International career^{‡}
| 2007 | England U-17 | 1 | (0) |
| 2012 | New Zealand U-23 | 6 | (1) |
| 2014– | New Zealand | 3 | |
- * Club domestic league appearances and goals as of 19:18, 2 August 2021 (UTC) ‡ National team caps and goals as of 6 June 2014

Jason Thomas Hicks is a footballer who plays as a defensive midfielder for NRFL Division 1 side Albany United.

== Club career ==
Hicks signed with Wellington Phoenix on a short-term injury replacement contract. However, his performances in the 2 league games he played in were impressive enough to land him a 2-year contract with the club. Hicks scored his first goal for the Phoenix in a 3–2 victory over the Newcastle Jets on 9 February 2014.

Hicks was called into the All Whites squad for a 30 May friendly in Auckland against South Africa by interim coach Neil Emblen. Hicks made his international debut on 30 May 2014 against South Africa, coming on as a substitute. The match ended in a nil-all draw.

On 19 November 2015, National Premier Leagues Victoria side South Melbourne FC confirmed that Hicks had joined the club for the 2016 Football Federation Victoria season. Upon signing for the club, Hicks stated his ambition was to "win the league with South". He was released by South Melbourne on 14 February 2016, prior to the beginning of the league season and prior to making a single appearance with the club.

On 13 February 2016, Jason Hicks signed with National Premier Leagues Victoria side Melbourne Knights FC. Hicks made his non-competitive debut for Melbourne Knights in a 3–2 loss to Sydney United 58 FC in the annual Friendship Cup fixture, that year contested at Sydney United Sports Centre in New South Wales. Hicks then made his official debut for the Knights in Round 1 of the NPL Victoria season, a 1–1 draw against Green Gully SC at Knights Stadium. The midfielder got his first assist in Red, White and Blue in Round 3, when he set up fellow midfielder James McGarry for the opening goal in a 2–1 win over Northcote City FC in Round 3. On 19 March 2016, Hicks scored a hat-trick in a 7–0 win over Eltham Redbacks FC in Round 4 of the 2016 FFA Cup. Just six days later, Hicks was again the hero as he scored the lone goal in Melbourne's 1–0 victory over FC Bulleen Lions in the NPL Victoria. In Round 10, Jason Hicks scored a 90th-minute winner against Melbourne Victory FC Youth.

In February 2016, Hicks joined Melbourne Knights. He was released by them in October 2017.

In 2020, Hicks played for Albany United. In 2021, he played for West Coast Rangers.
