= Tyler Boyd (soccer) =

American soccer player (born 1994)

- Boyd in 2026

Personal information
- Full name: Tyler Dominic Boyd
- Date of birth: December 30, 1994 (age 31)
- Place of birth: Tauranga, New Zealand
- Height: 6 ft 0 in (1.83 m)
- Position: Winger

Team information
- Current team: Los Angeles FC
- Number: 19

Youth career
- Melville United

Senior career*
Years	Team	Apps	(Gls)
2011	Melville United		
2011–2012	Waikato FC	14	(4)
2012–2015	Wellington Phoenix	48	(4)
2014–2015	Wellington Phoenix Reserves	6	(10)
2015–2017	Vitória de Guimarães B	73	(13)
2015–2019	Vitória de Guimarães	12	(0)
2017–2018	→ Tondela (loan)	27	(5)
2019	→ Ankaragücü (loan)	14	(6)
2019–2022	Beşiktaş	26	(2)
2021	→ Sivasspor (loan)	14	(5)
2021–2022	→ Çaykur Rizespor (loan)	29	(2)
2023	LA Galaxy	33	(7)
2024–2025	Nashville SC	26	(2)
2026–	Los Angeles FC	8	(1)

International career^{‡}
2013	New Zealand U20	9	(1)
2014–2015	New Zealand	5	(0)
2019	United States	10	(2)
Medal record
Representing United States
Runner-up	CONCACAF Gold Cup	2019
- * Club domestic league appearances and goals as of 22 April 2026 ‡ National team caps and goals as of November 19, 2019

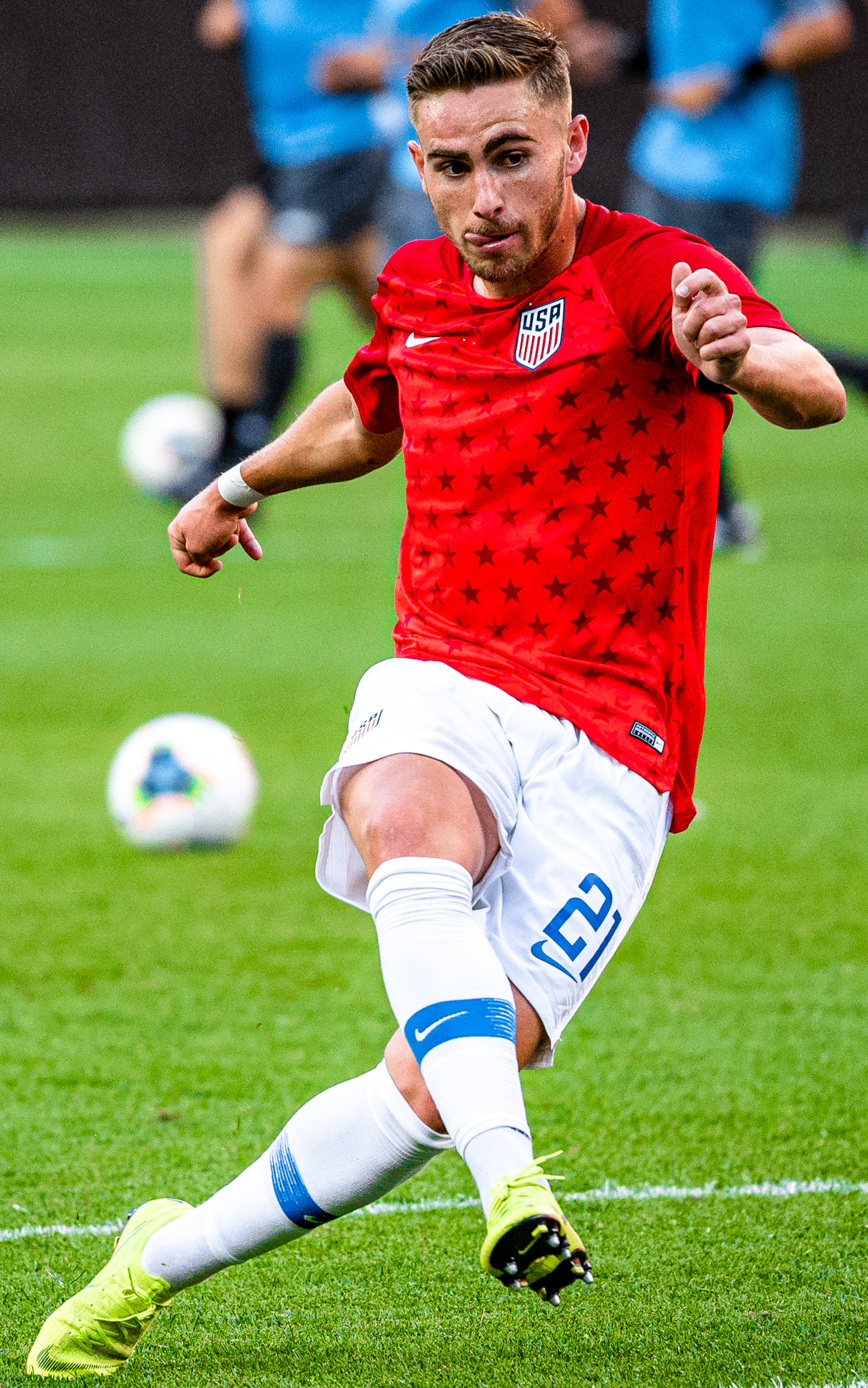
Boyd with the United States at the 2019 CONCACAF Gold Cup

Tyler Dominic Boyd (born December 30, 1994) is a professional soccer player who plays as a winger for Los Angeles FC in the Major League Soccer. Born in New Zealand, he represented the United States national team.

== Personal life ==
Boyd is a citizen of both New Zealand and the United States, having been born in New Zealand to a New Zealand father and an American mother. He was raised in Santa Ynez, California, until the age of 10, when he returned to New Zealand. He credits the UC Santa Barbara Gauchos men's soccer team as his inspiration for taking up the game as he served as a ball boy and they held camps near his hometown.

== Club career ==
=== Melville United and Waikato FC ===
After coming through the youth teams, Boyd first appeared for the senior team of Melville United in the NRFL Premier during the 2011 season at the age of 16, helping them to a third-placed finish. Showing promise, Boyd joined Waikato FC in the ASB Premiership for the 2011–12 season.

=== Wellington Phoenix ===
In September 2012, Boyd signed a three-year contract for the Wellington Phoenix and made his debut as a 17-year-old, coming on as a substitute in an A-League match against Sydney FC on October 6, 2012. Boyd scored 2 goals in 20 appearances for the Phoenix in the 2013–14 season and was named the club's under-23 player of the year.

=== Vitória de Guimarães ===
On February 24, 2015, Boyd signed a four-year deal with top Portuguese side Vitória de Guimarães to begin at the conclusion of the 2014–15 A-League season.

==== Loan to Tondela ====
On June 29, 2017, Boyd joined Tondela on loan, joining fellow former A-League player Nick Ansell.

==== Loan to MKE Ankaragücü ====
On January 31, 2019, Boyd joined Turkish Süper Lig side MKE Ankaragücü on loan until the end of the season.

=== Beşiktaş ===
On July 15, 2019, Boyd joined Turkish Süper Lig side Beşiktaş, signing a four-year contract. On November 7, 2019, Boyd scored his first goal for the club in a 3–1 loss to Sporting Braga in the group stage of the UEFA Europa League.

On September 13, 2020, Boyd scored a spectacular long-range effort in a 3–1 win over Trabzonspor. On October 7, Boyd was not included as one of the club's 14 foreign roster spots for the first half of the Süper Lig season. This happened despite the player having started all six of the club's games that season.

==== Loan to Sivasspor ====
On February 1, 2021, Boyd was loaned out to fellow Turkish Süper Lig club Sivasspor until the end of the season.

=== LA Galaxy ===
After a preseason trial, Boyd signed a one-year contract with American MLS club LA Galaxy on February 20, 2023.

=== Nashville SC ===
On December 30, 2023, it was announced that Boyd had signed with Nashville SC from the 2024 season until the end of 2026, with an extension option through 2027. As part of the deal, LA Galaxy received two international roster spots and $150,000 in General Allocation Money. The Galaxy would also receive up to $625,000 in conditional General Allocation Money should Boyd meet certain performance metrics. Boyd was waived by Nashville on January 8, 2026.

== International career ==
=== New Zealand ===
Boyd represented New Zealand at the 2013 OFC U-20 Championship in Fiji. He played in all three group matches at the 2013 FIFA U-20 World Cup in Turkey.

Boyd made his senior debut for New Zealand on 5 March 2014 with fellow debutant and former Melville United teammate Ryan Thomas in a friendly against Japan in Tokyo.

=== United States ===
On May 18, 2019, having solely appeared in friendly matches for New Zealand, FIFA approved a one-time switch for Boyd to represent the United States internationally. Just days later, on 22 May, he was named in the United States' provisional roster for the 2019 CONCACAF Gold Cup.

Boyd made his senior debut for the United States on June 9, 2019, in a friendly against Venezuela in Cincinnati, Ohio.

In his second game for the United States, Boyd scored his first goal for his new country, scoring in their Gold Cup game against Guyana on June 18, 2019. The goal was the 1,000th goal in United States men's national soccer team history and was assisted by midfielder Michael Bradley. In the 80th minute, Boyd doubled his goalscoring total with his second of the game.

== Career statistics ==
=== Club ===
As of match played July 17, 2024

Appearances and goals by club, season and competition
Club	Season	League			National cup (Note: Includes Taça de Portugal, Turkish Cup and U.S. Open Cup)		Continental		Other		Total	
Club	Season	Division	Apps	Goals	Apps	Goals	Apps	Goals	Apps	Goals	Apps	Goals
Vitória de Guimarães	2015–16	Primeira Liga	2	0	–		–		–		2	0
Vitória de Guimarães	2016–17	Primeira Liga	0	0	–		–		–		0	0
Vitória de Guimarães	2018–19	Primeira Liga	10	0	1	0	–		1 (Note: Appearance in Taça da Liga)	0	12	0
Vitória de Guimarães	Total		12	0	1	0	–		1	0	14	0
Vitória de Guimarães B	2015–16	Segunda Liga	39	5	–		–		–		39	5
Vitória de Guimarães B	2016–17	Segunda Liga	34	8	–		–		–		34	8
Vitória de Guimarães B	Total		73	13	–		–		–		73	13
Tondela (loan)	2017–18	Primeira Liga	27	5	–		–		1	0	28	5
Ankaragücü (loan)	2018–19	Süper Lig	14	6	–		–		–		14	6
Beşiktaş	2019–20	Süper Lig	21	1	3	1	4 (Note: Appearances in UEFA Europa League)	1	–		28	3
Beşiktaş	2020–21	Süper Lig	4	1	–		2 (Note: One appearance in UEFA Champions League, one appearance in UEFA Europa League)	0	–		6	1
Beşiktaş	2022–23	Süper Lig	1	0	–		–		–		1	0
Beşiktaş	Total		26	2	3	1	6	1	–		35	4
Sivasspor (loan)	2020–21	Süper Lig	14	5	1	0	–		–		15	5
Çaykur Rizespor (loan)	2021–22	Süper Lig	29	2	–		–		–		29	2
LA Galaxy	2023	MLS	33	7	3	1	–		2 (Note: Appearances in Leagues Cup)	0	38	8
Nashville SC	2024	MLS	21	2	–		3 (Note: Appearances in CONCACAF Champions Cup)	1	–		24	3
Career total			249	42	8	2	9	2	4	0	270	46

=== International ===
As of match played November 19, 2019

Appearances and goals by national team and year
National team	Year	Apps	Goals
United States	2019	10	2
Total		10	2

As of matches played June 30, 2019. United States score listed first, score column indicates score after each Boyd goal.

No.	Date	Venue	Cap	Opponent	Score	Result	Competition
1	June 18, 2019	Allianz Field, Saint Paul, United States	2	Guyana	2–0	4–0	2019 CONCACAF Gold Cup
2	June 18, 2019	Allianz Field, Saint Paul, United States	2	Guyana	4–0	4–0	2019 CONCACAF Gold Cup

== Honors ==
Nashville SC

- U.S. Open Cup: 2025

== See also ==
- List of association footballers who have been capped for two senior national teams
- List of foreign Primeira Liga players
- List of Wellington Phoenix FC players
