= 2018 OFC Champions League final =

- Event: 2018 OFC Champions League
Team Wellington	Lautoka
(New Zealand)	(Fiji)
10	3

First leg
Team Wellington	Lautoka
6	0
- Date: 13 May 2018
- Venue: David Farrington Park, Wellington
- Referee: Abdelkader Zitouni (Tahiti)
- Attendance: 1,200

Second leg
Lautoka	Team Wellington
3	4
- Date: 20 May 2018
- Venue: Churchill Park, Lautoka
- Referee: Norbert Hauata (Tahiti)
- Attendance: 1,000

The 2018 OFC Champions League final was the final of the 2018 OFC Champions League, the 17th edition of the Oceania Cup, Oceania's premier club football tournament organized by the Oceania Football Confederation (OFC), and the 12th season under the current OFC Champions League name.

The final was contested in two-legged home-and-away format between Team Wellington from New Zealand and Lautoka from Fiji. The first leg was hosted by Team Wellington at David Farrington Park in Wellington on 13 May, while the second leg was hosted by Lautoka FC at Churchill Park in Lautoka on 20 May 2018.

Team Wellington won the tie 10–3 on aggregate for their first OFC Champions League title. As winners, Team Wellington earned the right to represent the OFC at the 2018 FIFA Club World Cup, entering at the first round.

== Teams ==
In the following table, finals until 2006 were in the Oceania Club Championship era, since 2007 were in the OFC Champions League era.

Team	Previous finals appearances (bold indicates winners)
(New Zealand) Team Wellington	3 (2015, 2016, 2017)
(Fiji) Lautoka	None

This was Team Wellington's fourth consecutive and overall final appearance. However, they have yet to win the OFC Champions League, having lost to Auckland City in all three of their previous final appearances. This was the first final for Lautoka in their third season in the OFC Champions League.

== Venues ==
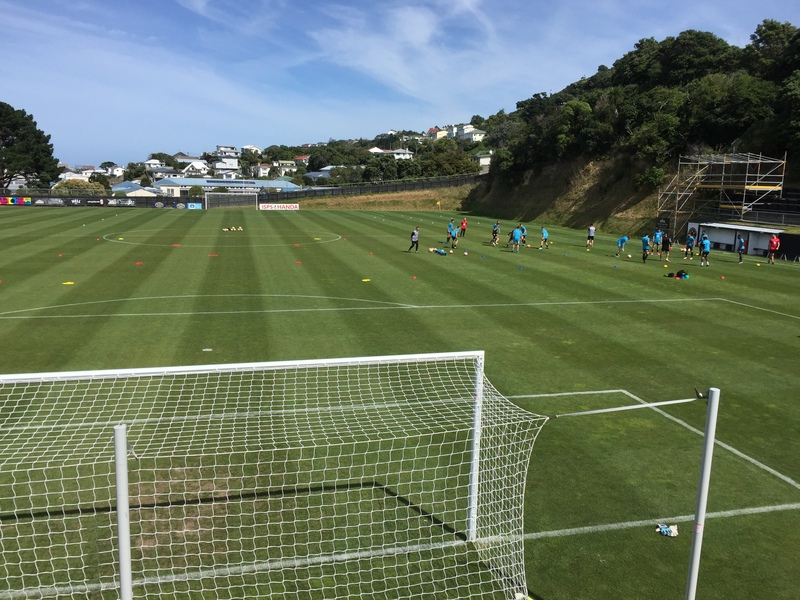
David Farrington Park in Wellington, New Zealand, hosted the First leg.

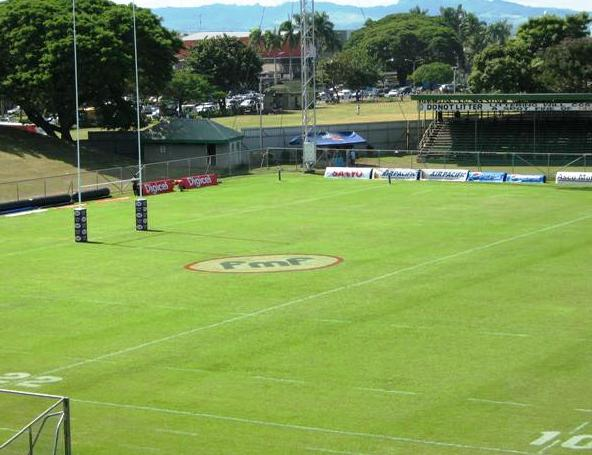
Churchill Park in Lautoka, Fiji, hosted the second leg.

== Road to the final ==
Note: In all results below, the score of the finalist is given first (H: home; A: away; N: neutral).

(New Zealand) Team Wellington				Round	(Fiji) Lautoka			
Opponent	Result			Group stage	Opponent	Result		
(Solomon Islands) Marist	1–1 (A)			Matchday 1	(Papua New Guinea) Madang	3–1 (N)		
(Samoa) Lupe o le Soaga	7–1 (N)			Matchday 2	(French Polynesia) Vénus	2–1 (N)		
(New Caledonia) Magenta	5–1 (N)			Matchday 3	(New Zealand) Auckland City	0–1 (A)		
**Group D winners**: Pos / Team / Pld / Pts; **1** / (New Zealand) Team Wellington / **3** / **7**; 2 / (Solomon Islands) Marist (H) / 3 / **5**; 3 / (New Caledonia) Magenta / 3 / **4**; 4 / (Samoa) Lupe o le Soaga / 3 / **0**; Source: OFC (H) Hosts				Final standings	**Group C runners-up**: Pos / Team / Pld / Pts; 1 / (New Zealand) Auckland City (H) / 3 / **9**; **2** / (Fiji) Lautoka / **3** / **6**; 3 / (French Polynesia) Vénus / 3 / **3**; 4 / (Papua New Guinea) Madang / 3 / **0**; Source: OFC (H) Hosts			
Opponent	Agg.	1st leg	2nd leg	Knockout stage	Opponent	Agg.	1st leg	2nd leg
(Papua New Guinea) Toti City	11–0 (H)			Quarter-finals	(French Polynesia) Dragon	2–1 (A)		
(New Zealand) Auckland City	2–2 (a)	0–0 (H)	2–2 (A)	Semi-finals	(Solomon Islands) Marist	2–1	1–1 (H)	1–0 (A)

== Format ==
The final was played on a home-and-away two-legged basis, with the order of legs decided by the draw for the knockout stage, which was held on 5 March 2018 at the OFC Headquarters in Auckland, New Zealand.

The away goals rule, extra time and a penalty shoot-out would be used to decide the winner if necessary.

== Matches ==
=== First leg ===
13 May 2018
14:00 UTC+12

Team Wellington (New Zealand)	6–0	(Fiji) Lautoka
Allen 16'; Sinclair 57', 71'; Bevin 61'; Barcia 63'; Schrijvers 84'	Report

David Farrington Park, Wellington
Attendance: 1,200
Referee: Abdelkader Zitouni (Tahiti)

**Team Wellington**	**Lautoka**

GK	1	(New Zealand) Scott Basalaj
CB	2	(New Zealand) Justin Gulley (c)
CB	3	(New Zealand) Scott Hilliar	(yellow card) 80'
CB	6	(New Zealand) Taylor Schrijvers
RM	13	(New Caledonia) Roy Kayara		(substituted off) 69'
CM	4	(New Zealand) Mario Ilich
CM	11	(Argentina) Mario Barcia
LM	7	(Republic of Ireland) Eric Molloy
RW	10	(New Zealand) Nathanael Hailemariam		(substituted off) 53'
CF	19	(England) Ross Allen		(substituted off) 86'
LW	12	(New Zealand) Andy Bevin
Substitutes:
GK	22	(New Zealand) Marcel Kampman
DF	5	(New Zealand) Liam Wood
MF	14	(New Zealand) Jack-Henry Sinclair		(substituted on) 53'
MF	20	(New Zealand) Daniel Mulholland
FW	16	(New Zealand) Angus Kilkolly		(substituted on) 86'
FW	21	(New Zealand) Hamish Watson		(substituted on) 69'
Manager:
(England) José Figueira

GK	22	(Fiji) Beniamino Mateinaqara (c)
CB	6	(Fiji) Jone Vesikula		(substituted off) 88'
CB	20	(Vanuatu) Brian Kaltack
CB	17	(Fiji) Kolinio Sivoki
RM	2	(Fiji) Edward Justin		(substituted off) 80'
CM	10	(New Zealand) Cory Chettleburgh
CM	7	(Fiji) Dave Radrigai
CM	11	(Fiji) Praneel Naidu	(red card) 64'
LM	8	(Fiji) Kavaia Rawaqa	(yellow card) 42'
CF	19	(Solomon Islands) Benjamin Totori	(yellow card) 18'
CF	16	(Fiji) Osea Vakatalesau		(substituted off) 69'
Substitutes:
GK	1	(Fiji) Senirusi Bokini
DF	5	(Fiji) Poasa Bainivalu		(substituted on) 88'
DF	18	(Fiji) Arami Manumanubai		(substituted on) 80'
FW	4	(Fiji) Mohammed Shazil		(substituted on) 69'
Manager:
(Fiji) Kamal Swamy

Assistant referees:
Tevita Makasini (Tonga)
Bernard Mutukera (Solomon Islands)
Fourth official:
Mederic Lacour (New Caledonia)

=== Second leg ===
20 May 2018
14:00 UTC+12

Lautoka (Fiji)	3–4	(New Zealand) Team Wellington
Totori 52', 84'; Shazil 82'	Report	Radrigai 10' (o.g.); Ilich 32'; Allen 51'; Kilkolly 88'

Churchill Park, Lautoka
Attendance: 1,000
Referee: Norbert Hauata (Tahiti)

**Lautoka**	**Team Wellington**

GK	1	(Fiji) Senirusi Bokini
RB	2	(Fiji) Edward Justin		(substituted off) 81'
CB	20	(Vanuatu) Brian Kaltack
CB	17	(Fiji) Kolinio Sivoki (c)
LB	7	(Fiji) Dave Radrigai	(yellow card) 30'
RM	4	(Fiji) Mohammed Shazil
CM	3	(Fiji) Zibraaz Sahib
CM	10	(New Zealand) Cory Chettleburgh		(substituted off) 89'
LM	8	(Fiji) Kavaia Rawaqa
CF	19	(Solomon Islands) Benjamin Totori
CF	16	(Fiji) Osea Vakatalesau	(yellow card) 27'	(substituted off) 46'
Substitutes:
GK	22	(Fiji) Beniamino Mateinaqara
DF	5	(Fiji) Poasa Bainivalu	(yellow card) 90'	(substituted on) 46'
DF	6	(Fiji) Jone Vesikula		(substituted on) 81'
DF	18	(Fiji) Arami Manumanubai		(substituted on) 89'
Manager:
(Fiji) Kamal Swamy

GK	1	(New Zealand) Scott Basalaj
CB	2	(New Zealand) Justin Gulley (c)
CB	6	(New Zealand) Taylor Schrijvers
CB	13	(New Caledonia) Roy Kayara		(substituted off) 80'
RM	14	(New Zealand) Jack-Henry Sinclair		(substituted off) 46'
CM	11	(Argentina) Mario Barcia	(yellow card) 57'
CM	4	(New Zealand) Mario Ilich
LM	7	(Republic of Ireland) Eric Molloy	(yellow card) 41'	(substituted off) 64'
RW	10	(New Zealand) Nathanael Hailemariam	(yellow card) 71'
CF	16	(New Zealand) Angus Kilkolly
LW	12	(New Zealand) Andy Bevin
Substitutes:
GK	22	(New Zealand) Marcel Kampman
DF	5	(New Zealand) Liam Wood		(substituted on) 64'
MF	20	(New Zealand) Daniel Mulholland
FW	19	(England) Ross Allen		(substituted on) 46'
FW	21	(New Zealand) Hamish Watson		(substituted on) 80'
Manager:
(England) José Figueira

Assistant referees:
Philippe Revel (Tahiti)
Bertrand Brial (New Caledonia)
Fourth official:
David Yareboinen (Papua New Guinea)
