= 2018 OFC Champions League knockout stage =

The 2018 OFC Champions League knockout stage was played from 7 April to 20 May 2018. A total of eight teams competed in the knockout stage to decide the champions of the 2018 OFC Champions League.

== Qualified teams ==
The winners and runners-up of each of the four groups in the group stage advanced to the quarter-finals.

Group	Winners	Runners-up
A	(Vanuatu) Nalkutan	(Papua New Guinea) Toti City
B	(French Polynesia) Dragon	(Solomon Islands) Solomon Warriors
C	(New Zealand) Auckland City	(Fiji) Lautoka
D	(New Zealand) Team Wellington	(Solomon Islands) Marist

== Format ==
The eight teams in the knockout stage played on a single-elimination basis. In the quarter-finals, each tie was played as a single match, while in the semi-finals and final, each tie was played on a home-and-away two-legged basis.

== Bracket ==
The bracket was determined as follows:

Round	Matchups
Quarter-finals	(Group winners host match, matchups decided by draw, teams from same group cannot play each other): QF1; QF2; QF3; QF4
Semi-finals	(Matchups and order of legs decided by draw, involving winners QF1, QF2, QF3, QF4): SF1; SF2
Final	(Order of legs decided by draw): Winner SF1 vs. Winner SF2

The bracket was decided after the draw for the knockout stage (quarter-finals, semi-finals, and final) was held on 5 March 2018 at the OFC Headquarters in Auckland, New Zealand.

Quarter-finals
(New Zealand) Team Wellington	11
(Papua New Guinea) Toti City	0
(New Zealand) Auckland City	2
(Solomon Islands) Solomon Warriors	0
(French Polynesia) Dragon	1
(Fiji) Lautoka	2
(Vanuatu) Nalkutan	1
(Solomon Islands) Marist	2

Semi-finals
(New Zealand) Team Wellington (a)	0	2	2
(New Zealand) Auckland City	0	2	2
(Fiji) Lautoka	1	1	2
(Solomon Islands) Marist	1	0	1

Final
(New Zealand) Team Wellington	6	4	10
(Fiji) Lautoka	0	3	3

== Schedule ==
The schedule of each round was as follows.

Round	First leg	Second leg
Quarter-finals	7–8 April 2018	
Semi-finals	22 April 2018	29 April 2018
Final	13 May 2018	20 May 2018

== Quarter-finals ==
In the quarter-finals, the winners of one group played the runners-up of another group (teams from same group cannot play each other), with the group winners hosting the match, and the matchups decided by draw.

Team 1	Score	Team 2
Team Wellington (New Zealand)	11–0	(Papua New Guinea) Toti City
Auckland City (New Zealand)	2–0	(Solomon Islands) Solomon Warriors
Dragon (French Polynesia)	1–2	(Fiji) Lautoka
Nalkutan (Vanuatu)	1–2	(Solomon Islands) Marist

7 April 2018
14:00 UTC+12

Team Wellington (New Zealand)	11–0	(Papua New Guinea) Toti City
Hailemariam 6', 14', 43'; Hilliar 17'; Kilkolly 39', 40', 46', 90+1'; Bevin 57'; Gulley 68'; Barcia 90+3'	Report

David Farrington Park, Wellington
Attendance: 200
Referee: Abdelkader Zitouni (Tahiti)

8 April 2018
14:00 UTC+12

Auckland City (New Zealand)	2–0	(Solomon Islands) Solomon Warriors
Tade 20'; Lea'alafa 56'	Report

Kiwitea Street, Auckland
Attendance: 350
Referee: Norbert Hauata (Tahiti)

7 April 2018
20:00 UTC−10

Dragon (French Polynesia)	1–2	(Fiji) Lautoka
Tetauira 43'	Report	Naidu 27'; Kaltack 89'

Stade Pater, Pirae
Attendance: 3,000
Referee: Joel Hopkken (Vanuatu)

7 April 2018
16:00 UTC+11

Nalkutan (Vanuatu)	1–2	(Solomon Islands) Marist
Kalo 50'	Report	Iniga 25'; Tome 45+3'

Korman Stadium, Port Vila
Attendance: 5,000
Referee: Campbell-Kirk Waugh (New Zealand)

== Semi-finals ==
In the semi-finals, the four quarter-final winners played in two ties, with the matchups and order of legs decided by draw.

Team 1	Agg.	Team 2	1st leg	2nd leg
Lautoka (Fiji)	2–1	(Solomon Islands) Marist	1–1	1–0
Team Wellington (New Zealand)	2–2 (a)	(New Zealand) Auckland City	0–0	2–2

22 April 2018
15:00 UTC+12

Lautoka (Fiji)	1–1	(Solomon Islands) Marist
Vakatalesau 49'	Report	Tome 36'

Churchill Park, Lautoka
Attendance: 4,500
Referee: Campbell-Kirk Waugh (New Zealand)
29 April 2018
14:30 UTC+11

Marist (Solomon Islands)	0–1	(Fiji) Lautoka
	Report	Naidu 64'

Lawson Tama Stadium, Honiara
Attendance: 14,000
Referee: Abdelkader Zitouni (Tahiti)

Lautoka won 2–1 on aggregate.

22 April 2018
13:00 UTC+12

Team Wellington (New Zealand)	0–0	(New Zealand) Auckland City
	Report

David Farrington Park, Wellington
Attendance: 900
Referee: Médéric Lacour (New Caledonia)
29 April 2018
12:30 UTC+12

Auckland City (New Zealand)	2–2	(New Zealand) Team Wellington
Tade 76'; Hilliar 90+7' (o.g.)	Report	Molloy 37'; Kilkolly 42' (pen.)

Kiwitea Street, Auckland
Attendance: 500
Referee: Nick Waldron (New Zealand)

2–2 on aggregate. Team Wellington won on away goals.

== Final ==
In the final, the two semi-final winners played each other, with the order of legs decided by draw.

13 May 2018
14:00 UTC+12

Team Wellington (New Zealand)	6–0	(Fiji) Lautoka
Allen 16'; Sinclair 57', 71'; Bevin 61'; Barcia 63'; Schrijvers 84'	Report

David Farrington Park, Wellington
Attendance: 1,200
Referee: Abdelkader Zitouni (Tahiti)
20 May 2018
14:00 UTC+12

Lautoka (Fiji)	3–4	(New Zealand) Team Wellington
Totori 52', 84'; Shazil 82'	Report	Radrigai 10' (o.g.); Ilich 32'; Allen 51'; Kilkolly 88'

Churchill Park, Lautoka
Attendance: 1,000
Referee: Norbert Hauata (Tahiti)

Team Wellington won 10–3 on aggregate.
