= 2018 OFC Champions League group stage =

The 2018 OFC Champions League group stage was played from 10 February to 3 March 2018. A total of 16 teams competed in the group stage to decide the eight places in the knockout stage of the 2018 OFC Champions League.

== Draw ==
The draw for the group stage was held on 15 September 2017 at the OFC Headquarters in Auckland, New Zealand. The 16 teams (14 teams entering the group stage and two teams advancing from the qualifying stage) were drawn into four groups of four, with each group containing two teams from Pot B (which were drawn into positions 1–2 to determine the fixtures) and two teams from Pot C (which were drawn into positions 3–4 to determine the fixtures). Teams from the same association, as well as the two teams advancing from the qualifying stage, could not be drawn into the same group. The teams were seeded based on the following:

- Pot B contained the champions of the seven developed associations, and the runners-up of New Zealand, by virtue of having the best second team in the 2017 OFC Champions League.
- Pot C contained the runners-up of the six developed associations apart from New Zealand, and the two teams advancing from the qualifying stage, whose identity was not known at the time of the draw.

Pot B	Pot C
(Fiji) Lautoka; (New Caledonia) Magenta; (New Zealand) Team Wellington; (Papua New Guinea) Toti City; (Solomon Islands) Solomon Warriors (Note: The identity of the teams from Solomon Islands was not known at the time of the draw.); (French Polynesia) Dragon; (Vanuatu) Nalkutan; (New Zealand) Auckland City	(Fiji) Ba; (New Caledonia) Lössi; (Papua New Guinea) Madang; (Solomon Islands) Marist; (French Polynesia) Vénus; (Vanuatu) Erakor Golden Star; Qualifying stage winners; Qualifying stage runners-up

The following were the winners and runners-up of the qualifying stage which join the 14 direct entrants in the group stage.

Qualifying stage winners	Qualifying stage runners-up
(Cook Islands) Tupapa Maraerenga	(Samoa) Lupe o le Soaga

== Format ==
The four teams in each group played each other on a round-robin basis at a centralised venue. The winners and runners-up of each group advanced to the quarter-finals of the knockout stage.

== Schedule ==
The hosts of each group were announced by OFC on 31 October 2017.

- Group A matches were played between 10 and 16 February 2018 in Port Vila, Vanuatu.
- Group B matches were played between 11 and 17 February 2018 in Pirae, Tahiti.
- Group C matches were played between 25 February – 3 March 2018 in Auckland, New Zealand.
- Group D matches were played between 24 February – 2 March 2018 in Honiara, Solomon Islands.

The schedule of each matchday was as follows.

Matchday	Dates				Matches
Matchday	Group A	Group B	Group C	Group D	Matches
Matchday 1	10 February 2018	11 February 2018	25 February 2018	24 February 2018	Team 4 vs. Team 1, Team 2 vs. Team 3
Matchday 2	13 February 2018	14 February 2018	28 February 2018	27 February 2018	Team 1 vs. Team 3, Team 4 vs. Team 2
Matchday 3	16 February 2018	17 February 2018	3 March 2018	2 March 2018	Team 1 vs. Team 2, Team 3 vs. Team 4

== Groups ==
=== Group A ===
All times were local, VUT (UTC+11).

Pos	Team	Pld	W	D	L	GF	GA	GD	Pts	Qualification	NAL	TOT	BAF	TUP
1	(Vanuatu) Nalkutan (H)	3	3	0	0	9	1	+8	9	Knockout stage	—	—	1–0	—
2	(Papua New Guinea) Toti City	3	2	0	1	9	6	+3	6	Knockout stage	1–4	—	1–0	—
3	(Fiji) Ba	3	1	0	2	4	3	+1	3		—	—	—	4–1
4	(Cook Islands) Tupapa Maraerenga	3	0	0	3	3	15	−12	0		0–4	2–7	—	—

Source: OFC
(H) Hosts
10 February 2018
14:00

Tupapa Maraerenga (Cook Islands)	2–7	(Papua New Guinea) Toti City
Latimer 45+1' (pen.); Bonsu-Maro 90+1'	Report	Dabinyaba 10', 64'; Gunemba 15', 63', 71', 82'; Tanito 34'

Korman Stadium, Port Vila
Attendance: 1,000
Referee: Abdelkader Zitouni (Tahiti)
10 February 2018
17:00

Nalkutan (Vanuatu)	1–0	(Fiji) Ba
Naka 65' (pen.)	Report

Korman Stadium, Port Vila
Attendance: 4,000
Referee: Médéric Lacour (New Caledonia)

13 February 2018
14:00

Toti City (Papua New Guinea)	1–0	(Fiji) Ba
Tanito 63'	Report

Korman Stadium, Port Vila
Attendance: 1,000
Referee: George Time (Solomon Islands)
13 February 2018
17:00

Tupapa Maraerenga (Cook Islands)	0–4	(Vanuatu) Nalkutan
	Report	Soromon 16'; Naka 59'; Coulon 65'; Lenga 87'

Korman Stadium, Port Vila
Attendance: 2,000
Referee: Matthew Conger (New Zealand)

16 February 2018
14:00

Ba (Fiji)	4–1	(Cook Islands) Tupapa Maraerenga
Nabenia 24', 31', 53'; Rao 85'	Report	Latimer 76'

Korman Stadium, Port Vila
Attendance: 1,000
Referee: Ben Aukwai (Solomon Islands)
16 February 2018
17:00

Toti City (Papua New Guinea)	1–4	(Vanuatu) Nalkutan
Dabinyaba 64'	Report	Soromon 47', 58', 90'; Manuriki 59'

Korman Stadium, Port Vila
Attendance: 3,200
Referee: Matthew Conger (New Zealand)

=== Group B ===
All times were local, TAHT (UTC−10).

Pos	Team	Pld	W	D	L	GF	GA	GD	Pts	Qualification	DRA	SOL	ERA	LOS
1	(French Polynesia) Dragon (H)	3	2	0	1	9	5	+4	6	Knockout stage	—	—	—	4–0
2	(Solomon Islands) Solomon Warriors	3	2	0	1	8	4	+4	6	Knockout stage	2–1	—	—	6–1
3	(Vanuatu) Erakor Golden Star	3	1	1	1	7	6	+1	4		3–4	2–0	—	—
4	(New Caledonia) Lössi	3	0	1	2	3	12	−9	1		—	—	2–2	—

Source: OFC
(H) Hosts
11 February 2018
15:00

Erakor Golden Star (Vanuatu)	2–0	(Solomon Islands) Solomon Warriors
Mansale 66'; Kaltack 67'	Report

Stade Pater, Pirae
Attendance: 1,234
Referee: Campbell-Kirk Waugh (New Zealand)
11 February 2018
18:00

Dragon (French Polynesia)	4–0	(New Caledonia) Lössi
Tetauira 47', 78'; Lemaître 72'; Tze-Yu 90+2'	Report

Stade Pater, Pirae
Attendance: 1,234
Referee: Nick Waldron (New Zealand)

14 February 2018
15:00

Solomon Warriors (Solomon Islands)	6–1	(New Caledonia) Lössi
Tangis 2', 40'; Feni 31', 78', 90'; Alick 45+1'	Report	Mathelon 73'

Stade Pater, Pirae
Attendance: 602
Referee: Sione Lelenga (Tonga)
14 February 2018
18:00

Erakor Golden Star (Vanuatu)	3–4	(French Polynesia) Dragon
Wanemut 15' (pen.); Molivakarua 46'; Meriel 84' (o.g.)	Report	Lemaître 11'; Seino 58'; Tetauira 90+2' (pen.), 90+5'

Stade Pater, Pirae
Attendance: 602
Referee: Nick Waldron (New Zealand)

17 February 2018
15:00

Lössi (New Caledonia)	2–2	(Vanuatu) Erakor Golden Star
Wamowe 29'; Wanapopo 39'	Report	Daniel 3'; Mansale 51'

Stade Pater, Pirae
Attendance: 1,507
Referee: Peter Linney (New Zealand)
17 February 2018
18:00

Solomon Warriors (Solomon Islands)	2–1	(French Polynesia) Dragon
Tangis 22'; Molea 83' (pen.)	Report	Tze-Yu 77'

Stade Pater, Pirae
Attendance: 1,507
Referee: Campbell-Kirk Waugh (New Zealand)

=== Group C ===
All times were local, NZDT (UTC+13).

Pos	Team	Pld	W	D	L	GF	GA	GD	Pts	Qualification	AUC	LAU	VEN	MAD
1	(New Zealand) Auckland City (H)	3	3	0	0	13	0	+13	9	Knockout stage	—	1–0	—	5–0
2	(Fiji) Lautoka	3	2	0	1	5	3	+2	6	Knockout stage	—	—	—	3–1
3	(French Polynesia) Vénus	3	1	0	2	3	10	−7	3		0–7	1–2	—	—
4	(Papua New Guinea) Madang	3	0	0	3	2	10	−8	0		—	—	1–2	—

Source: OFC
(H) Hosts
25 February 2018
13:00

Lautoka (Fiji)	3–1	(Papua New Guinea) Madang
Totori 21'; Chettleburgh 32'; Kaltack 77'	Report	Pulung 40'

The Trusts Arena, Auckland
Attendance: 250
Referee: Hamilton Siau (Solomon Islands)
25 February 2018
16:00

Vénus (French Polynesia)	0–7	(New Zealand) Auckland City
	Report	Tade 7', 36' (pen.), 75'; Drake 37'; Lea'alafa 44'; McCowatt 60'; Wilkins 66'

The Trusts Arena, Auckland
Attendance: 250
Referee: Médéric Lacour (New Caledonia)

28 February 2018
13:00

Vénus (French Polynesia)	1–2	(Fiji) Lautoka
R. Tehau 4'	Report	Drudru 62', 90+2'

The Trusts Arena, Auckland
Attendance: 250
Referee: Joel Hopkken (Vanuatu)
28 February 2018
16:00

Auckland City (New Zealand)	5–0	(Papua New Guinea) Madang
Morgan 13'; McCowatt 17'; Tade 74', 87'; Wilkins 90+2'	Report

The Trusts Arena, Auckland
Attendance: 200
Referee: George Time (Solomon Islands)

3 March 2018
13:00

Madang (Papua New Guinea)	1–2	(French Polynesia) Vénus
Hans 29' (pen.)	Report	T. Tehau 12', 90+1'

The Trusts Arena, Auckland
Attendance: 50
Referee: Joel Hopkken (Vanuatu)
3 March 2018
16:00

Auckland City (New Zealand)	1–0	(Fiji) Lautoka
Tade 70'	Report

The Trusts Arena, Auckland
Attendance: 750
Referee: Médéric Lacour (New Caledonia)

=== Group D ===
All times were local, SBT (UTC+11).

Pos	Team	Pld	W	D	L	GF	GA	GD	Pts	Qualification	WEL	MAR	MAG	LUP
1	(New Zealand) Team Wellington	3	2	1	0	13	3	+10	7	Knockout stage	—	—	5–1	7–1
2	(Solomon Islands) Marist (H)	3	1	2	0	5	3	+2	5	Knockout stage	1–1	—	1–1	—
3	(New Caledonia) Magenta	3	1	1	1	4	6	−2	4		—	—	—	2–0
4	(Samoa) Lupe o le Soaga	3	0	0	3	2	12	−10	0		—	1–3	—	—

Source: OFC
(H) Hosts
24 February 2018
13:00

Magenta (New Caledonia)	2–0	(Samoa) Lupe o le Soaga
Sele 25'; Ounei 38'	Report

Lawson Tama Stadium, Honiara
Attendance: 8,000
Referee: Robinson Banga (Vanuatu)
24 February 2018
16:00

Marist (Solomon Islands)	1–1	(New Zealand) Team Wellington
Iniga 37'	Report	Kilkolly 85'

Lawson Tama Stadium, Honiara
Attendance: 12,000
Referee: Norbert Hauata (Tahiti)

27 February 2018
13:00

Team Wellington (New Zealand)	7–1	(Samoa) Lupe o le Soaga
Schrijvers 2'; Allen 24', 31' (pen.), 68'; Sinclair 41'; Mulholland 79'; Hailemariam 87'	Report	Toni 60' (pen.)

Lawson Tama Stadium, Honiara
Attendance: 3,000
Referee: Averii Jacques (Tahiti)
27 February 2018
16:00

Marist (Solomon Islands)	1–1	(New Caledonia) Magenta
Boso 5'	Report	Athale 11'

Lawson Tama Stadium, Honiara
Attendance: 7,500
Referee: Abdelkader Zitouni (Tahiti)

2 March 2018
13:00

Team Wellington (New Zealand)	5–1	(New Caledonia) Magenta
Allen 32', 66' (pen.); Molloy 54'; Watson 76' (pen.); Kilkolly 88'	Report	Sele 10'

Lawson Tama Stadium, Honiara
Attendance: 2,600
Referee: Norbert Hauata (Tahiti)
2 March 2018
16:00

Lupe o le Soaga (Samoa)	1–3	(Solomon Islands) Marist
Toni 53' (pen.)	Report	Iani 45+3', 63'; Kaua 85'

Lawson Tama Stadium, Honiara
Attendance: 5,500
Referee: David Yareboinen (Papua New Guinea)
