= Owen Parker-Price =

New Zealand footballer (born 1998)

Personal information
- Date of birth: 10 December 1998 (age 27)
- Position: Midfielder

Team information
- Current team: Örgryte
- Number: 23

Youth career
- –2014: Olé Football Academy
- 2016: Team Wellington

Senior career*
Years	Team	Apps	(Gls)
2015–2018	Western Suburbs	54	(22)
2017–2018	→ Auckland City (loan)	5	(0)
2018	→ Eastern Suburbs (loan)	13	(1)
2019–2025	Torslanda	146	(48)
2025–	Örgryte	20	(0)

International career^{‡}
2015	New Zealand U17	4	(0)
2025–	New Zealand	3	(1)
- * Club domestic league appearances and goals as of 24 July 2026 ‡ National team caps and goals as of 24 July 2026

Owen Parker-Price (born 10 December 1998) is a professional footballer who plays as a midfielder for Allsvenskan club Örgryte and the New Zealand national team.

== Club career ==
After six seasons with lower-tier Swedish side Torslanda, where he played under the tutelage of his New Zealand compatriot Declan Edge, Parker-Price signed for Örgryte on 18 August 2025.

== International career ==
Parker-Price was part of the New Zealand U17 squad in their 2015 FIFA U-17 World Cup campaign, starting all four games as New Zealand exited in the round of 16 following a 1–0 loss to Brazil.

Parker-Price was called up to the senior New Zealand national team for the first time for friendly matches against Poland and Norway in October 2025.

== Career statistics ==
=== International ===
As of match played 27 September 2026

Scores and results list the New Zealand goal tally first.

List of international goals scored by Owen Parker-Price
No.	Date	Venue	Opponent	Score	Result	Competition
1.	27 September 2026	Longxing Football Stadium, Chongqing, China	China	3–0	3–0	Friendly
