= 2018 FIFA Club World Cup =

FIFA Club World Cup UAE 2018 presented by Alibaba Cloud كأس العالم للأندية لكرة القدم الإمارات العربية المتحدة 2018

Tournament details
- Host country: United Arab Emirates
- Dates: 12–22 December
- Teams: 7 (from 6 confederations)
- Venues: 2 (in 2 host cities)

Final positions
- Champions: (Spain) Real Madrid (4th title)
- Runners-up: (United Arab Emirates) Al Ain
- Third place: (Argentina) River Plate
- Fourth place: (Japan) Kashima Antlers

Tournament statistics
- Matches played: 8
- Goals scored: 33 (4.13 per match)
- Attendance: 152,675 (19,084 per match)
- Top scorer(s): (Wales) Gareth Bale (Colombia) Rafael Santos Borré (3 goals each)
- Best player: (Wales) Gareth Bale
- Fair play award: (Spain) Real Madrid

The 2018 FIFA Club World Cup (officially known as the FIFA Club World Cup UAE 2018 presented by Alibaba Cloud for sponsorship reasons) was the 15th edition of the FIFA Club World Cup, a FIFA-organised international club football tournament between the winners of the six continental confederations, as well as the host nation's league champions. The tournament was hosted by the United Arab Emirates from 12 to 22 December 2018.

Real Madrid were the defending champions, having won the previous two editions, and qualified for the 2018 edition as well. They successfully defended their title (their third consecutive) after defeating Al Ain 4–1 in the final. With the win, they broke the tie with their club rivals Barcelona to become the outright record winners of the competition.

== Host bids ==
The application process for the 2017–2018 as well as the 2015–2016 editions, i.e. two hosts, each hosting two years, began in February 2014. Member associations interested in hosting must submit a declaration of interest by 30 March 2014, and provide the complete set of bidding documents by 25 August 2014. The FIFA Executive Committee was to select the hosts at their meeting in Morocco in December 2014, but the final decision was delayed until the FIFA Executive Committee meetings on 19–20 March 2015.

The following countries expressed an interest in bidding to host the tournament:

- Brazil
- Japan
- United Arab Emirates

The FIFA Executive Committee officially confirmed the United Arab Emirates as hosts of the 2017 and 2018 tournaments on 20 March 2015 during their meeting in Zürich, Switzerland.

== Qualified teams ==
The following teams qualified for the tournament.

Location of teams of the 2018 FIFA Club World Cup.

Team	Confederation	Qualification	Qualified date	Participation (bold indicates winners)
Entering in the semi-finals
(Argentina) River Plate	CONMEBOL	Winners of the 2018 Copa Libertadores	9 December 2018 (Note: The second leg of the Copa Libertadores Finals, originally scheduled on 24 November 2018, was postponed to 9 December 2018 due to an attack on the Boca Juniors team bus when several players were injured.)	2nd (Previous: 2015)
(Spain) Real Madrid^{TH}	UEFA	Winners of the 2017–18 UEFA Champions League	26 May 2018	5th (Previous: 2000, **2014**, **2016**, **2017**)
Entering in the second round
(Japan) Kashima Antlers	AFC	Winners of the 2018 AFC Champions League	10 November 2018	2nd (Previous: 2016)
(Tunisia) Espérance de Tunis	CAF	Winners of the 2018 CAF Champions League	9 November 2018	2nd (Previous: 2011)
(Mexico) Guadalajara	CONCACAF	Winners of the 2018 CONCACAF Champions League	25 April 2018	Debut
Entering in the first round
(New Zealand) Team Wellington	OFC	Winners of the 2018 OFC Champions League	20 May 2018	Debut
(United Arab Emirates) Al Ain	AFC (host)	Winners of the 2017–18 UAE Pro League	14 May 2018 (Note: Al Ain won the 2017–18 UAE Pro League on 21 April 2018. Their participation in the 2018 FIFA Club World Cup was officially confirmed on 14 May 2018 after Al-Jazira became the last team from the United Arab Emirates other than Al Ain to be eliminated from the 2018 AFC Champions League. Al Ain themselves were eliminated from the 2018 AFC Champions League on 15 May 2018, thereby confirming them entering the first round.)	Debut

== Venues ==
The two venues were the Zayed Sports City Stadium in Abu Dhabi and the Hazza bin Zayed Stadium in Al Ain.

Al Ain	Abu Dhabi	Location of the host cities of the 2018 FIFA Club World Cup.
Hazza bin Zayed Stadium	Zayed Sports City Stadium	Location of the host cities of the 2018 FIFA Club World Cup.
24°14′44.14″N 55°42′59.7″E	24°24′57.92″N 54°27′12.93″E	Location of the host cities of the 2018 FIFA Club World Cup.
Capacity: 22,717	Capacity: 43,000	Location of the host cities of the 2018 FIFA Club World Cup.

== Match officials ==
A total of six referees, twelve assistant referees, and six video assistant referees were appointed for the tournament. FIFA announced on 22 November 2018 that the trio of referees and assistant referees from CAF were changed.

Confederation	Referee	Assistant referees	Video assistant referee
AFC	(Japan) Ryuji Sato	(Japan) Toru Sagara (Japan) Hiroshi Yamauchi	(United Arab Emirates) Mohammed Abdulla Hassan Mohamed
CAF (Note: The officiating team from CAF replaced the original trio of Mehdi Abid Charef, Abdelhak Etchiali (both from Algeria) and Anouar Hmila (from Tunisia).)	(Ethiopia) Bamlak Tessema Weyesa	(South Africa) Zakhele Thusi Siwela (Sudan) Waleed Ahmed	
CONCACAF	(United States) Jair Marrufo	(United States) Frank Anderson (United States) Corey Rockwell	(United States) Mark Geiger
CONMEBOL	(Brazil) Wilton Sampaio	(Brazil) Rodrigo Figueiredo (Brazil) Bruno Boschilia	(Argentina) Mauro Vigliano
OFC	(New Zealand) Matthew Conger	(Tonga) Tevita Makasini (New Zealand) Mark Rule	
UEFA	(Italy) Gianluca Rocchi	(Italy) Elenito Di Liberatore (Italy) Mauro Tonolini	(Poland) Paweł Gil (Italy) Massimiliano Irrati (Netherlands) Danny Makkelie

== Squads ==
Each team had to name a 23-man squad (three of whom must be goalkeepers). Injury replacements were allowed until 24 hours before the team's first match.

== Matches ==
The draw of the tournament was held on 4 September 2018, 10:00 CEST (UTC+2), at the FIFA Headquarters in Zürich, to decide the matchups of the second round (between the first round winner and teams from AFC, CAF, and CONCACAF), and the opponents of the two second round winners in the semi-finals (teams from CONMEBOL and UEFA). At the time of the draw, the identity of the teams from AFC, CAF and CONMEBOL were not known.

If a match was tied after normal playing time:

- For elimination matches, extra time would be played. If still tied after extra time, a penalty shoot-out would be held to determine the winner.
- For the matches for fifth place and third place, no extra time would be played, and a penalty shoot-out would be held to determine the winner.

First round
12 December – Al Ain
(United Arab Emirates) Al Ain (p)	3 (4)
(New Zealand) Team Wellington	3 (3)

Second round
15 December – Al Ain
(Japan) Kashima Antlers	3
(Mexico) Guadalajara	2
15 December – Al Ain
(Tunisia) Espérance de Tunis	0
(United Arab Emirates) Al Ain	3

Semi-finals
19 December – Abu Dhabi
(Japan) Kashima Antlers	1
(Spain) Real Madrid	3
18 December – Al Ain
(Argentina) River Plate	2 (4)
(United Arab Emirates) Al Ain (p)	2 (5)
Match for fifth place
18 December – Al Ain
(Tunisia) Espérance de Tunis (p)	1 (6)
(Mexico) Guadalajara	1 (5)

Final
22 December – Abu Dhabi
(Spain) Real Madrid	4
(United Arab Emirates) Al Ain	1
Match for third place
22 December – Abu Dhabi
(Japan) Kashima Antlers	0
(Argentina) River Plate	4

All times are local, GST (UTC+4).

=== First round ===
12 December 2018
19:30

Al Ain (United Arab Emirates)	3–3 (a.e.t.)	(New Zealand) Team Wellington
Shiotani 45'; Doumbia 49'; Berg 85'	Report	Barcia 11'; Clapham 15'; Ilich 44'
Penalties
Diaky (penalty scored); Berg (penalty missed); El Shahat (penalty scored); Shiotani (penalty scored); Caio (penalty scored)	4–3	(penalty scored) Allen; (penalty missed) Kilkolly; (penalty scored) Ilich; (penalty scored) Watson; (penalty missed) Gulley

Hazza bin Zayed Stadium, Al Ain
Attendance: 15,279
Referee: Ryuji Sato (Japan)

=== Second round ===
15 December 2018
17:00

Kashima Antlers (Japan)	3–2	(Mexico) Guadalajara
Nagaki 49'; Serginho 69' (pen.); Abe 84'	Report	Zaldívar 3'; Léo Silva 90+4' (o.g.)

Hazza bin Zayed Stadium, Al Ain
Attendance: 3,997
Referee: Bamlak Tessema Weyesa (Ethiopia)

15 December 2018
20:30

Espérance de Tunis (Tunisia)	0–3	(United Arab Emirates) Al Ain
	Report	Ahmed 2'; El Shahat 16'; Al-Ahbabi 60'

Hazza bin Zayed Stadium, Al Ain
Attendance: 21,333
Referee: Jair Marrufo (United States)

=== Match for fifth place ===
18 December 2018
17:30

Espérance de Tunis (Tunisia)	1–1	(Mexico) Guadalajara
Belaïli 38' (pen.)	Report	Sandoval 5' (pen.)
Penalties
Belaïli (penalty missed); Machani (penalty scored); Chemmam (penalty scored); Bguir (penalty missed); Khenissi (penalty scored); Derbali (penalty scored); Coulibaly (penalty scored); Dhaouadi (penalty scored)	6–5	(penalty scored) Zaldívar; (penalty missed) Marín; (penalty scored) Godínez; (penalty missed) Van Rankin; (penalty scored) Salcido; (penalty scored) Pineda; (penalty scored) Ponce; (penalty missed) Brizuela

Hazza bin Zayed Stadium, Al Ain
Attendance: 5,883
Referee: Matthew Conger (New Zealand)

=== Semi-finals ===
18 December 2018
20:30

River Plate (Argentina)	2–2 (a.e.t.)	(United Arab Emirates) Al Ain
Borré 11', 16'	Report	Berg 3'; Caio 51'
Penalties
Scocco (penalty scored); Quintero (penalty scored); Pratto (penalty scored); Borré (penalty scored); Pérez (penalty missed)	4–5	(penalty scored) Caio; (penalty scored) Shiotani; (penalty scored) Al-Ahbabi; (penalty scored) Abdulrahman; (penalty scored) Yaslam

Hazza bin Zayed Stadium, Al Ain
Attendance: 21,383
Referee: Gianluca Rocchi (Italy)

19 December 2018
20:30

Kashima Antlers (Japan)	1–3	(Spain) Real Madrid
Doi 78'	Report	Bale 44', 53', 55'

Zayed Sports City Stadium, Abu Dhabi
Attendance: 30,554
Referee: Wilton Sampaio (Brazil)

=== Match for third place ===
22 December 2018
17:30

Kashima Antlers (Japan)	0–4	(Argentina) River Plate
	Report	Zuculini 24'; G. Martínez 73', 90+3'; Borré 89' (pen.)

Zayed Sports City Stadium, Abu Dhabi
Attendance: 13,550
Referee: Gianluca Rocchi (Italy)

=== Final ===
22 December 2018
20:30

Real Madrid (Spain)	4–1	(United Arab Emirates) Al Ain
Modrić 14'; Llorente 60'; Ramos 79'; Nader 90+1' (o.g.)	Report	Shiotani 86'

Zayed Sports City Stadium, Abu Dhabi
Attendance: 40,696
Referee: Jair Marrufo (United States)

== Goalscorers ==
Rank	Player	Team	Goals
1	(Wales) Gareth Bale	(Spain) Real Madrid	3
1	(Colombia) Rafael Santos Borré	(Argentina) River Plate	3
3	(Sweden) Marcus Berg	(United Arab Emirates) Al Ain	2
3	(Argentina) Gonzalo Martínez	(Argentina) River Plate	2
3	(Japan) Tsukasa Shiotani	(United Arab Emirates) Al Ain	2
6	(Japan) Hiroki Abe	(Japan) Kashima Antlers	1
6	(United Arab Emirates) Mohamed Ahmed	(United Arab Emirates) Al Ain	1
6	(United Arab Emirates) Bandar Al-Ahbabi	(United Arab Emirates) Al Ain	1
6	(Argentina) Mario Barcia	(New Zealand) Team Wellington	1
6	(Algeria) Youcef Belaïli	(Tunisia) Espérance de Tunis	1
6	(Brazil) Caio	(United Arab Emirates) Al Ain	1
6	(New Zealand) Aaron Clapham	(New Zealand) Team Wellington	1
6	(Japan) Shoma Doi	(Japan) Kashima Antlers	1
6	(Mali) Tongo Doumbia	(United Arab Emirates) Al Ain	1
6	(Egypt) Hussein El Shahat	(United Arab Emirates) Al Ain	1
6	(New Zealand) Mario Ilich	(New Zealand) Team Wellington	1
6	(Spain) Marcos Llorente	(Spain) Real Madrid	1
6	(Croatia) Luka Modrić	(Spain) Real Madrid	1
6	(Japan) Ryota Nagaki	(Japan) Kashima Antlers	1
6	(Spain) Sergio Ramos	(Spain) Real Madrid	1
6	(Mexico) Gael Sandoval	(Mexico) Guadalajara	1
6	(Brazil) Serginho	(Japan) Kashima Antlers	1
6	(Mexico) Ángel Zaldívar	(Mexico) Guadalajara	1
6	(Argentina) Bruno Zuculini	(Argentina) River Plate	1

1 own goal

- (Brazil) Léo Silva (Kashima Antlers, against Guadalajara)
- (United Arab Emirates) Yahya Nader (Al Ain, against Real Madrid)

== Awards ==
The following awards were given at the conclusion of the tournament.

Adidas Golden Ball Alibaba Cloud Award	Adidas Silver Ball	Adidas Bronze Ball
(Wales) Gareth Bale (Real Madrid)	(Brazil) Caio (Al Ain)	(Colombia) Rafael Santos Borré (River Plate)
FIFA Fair Play Award
(Spain) Real Madrid

FIFA also named a man of the match for the best player in each game at the tournament.

Alibaba Cloud Match Award
Match	Man of the match	Club	Opponent
1	(United Arab Emirates) Khalid Eisa	(United Arab Emirates) Al Ain	(New Zealand) Team Wellington
2	(Egypt) Hussein El Shahat	(United Arab Emirates) Al Ain	(Tunisia) Espérance de Tunis
3	(Japan) Shoma Doi	(Japan) Kashima Antlers	(Mexico) Guadalajara
4	(Tunisia) Rami Jridi	(Tunisia) Espérance de Tunis	(Mexico) Guadalajara
5	(United Arab Emirates) Khalid Eisa (2)	(United Arab Emirates) Al Ain	(Argentina) River Plate
6	(Wales) Gareth Bale	(Spain) Real Madrid	(Japan) Kashima Antlers
7	(Colombia) Rafael Santos Borré	(Argentina) River Plate	(Japan) Kashima Antlers
8	(Spain) Marcos Llorente	(Spain) Real Madrid	(United Arab Emirates) Al Ain
