= David Farrington =

David Farrington may refer to:

- Dave Farrington (1948–2008), New Zealand footballer and football manager
- David Farrington Park, a football ground in Wellington, New Zealand
- David P. Farrington (1944–2024), British criminologist
