= 2018 OFC Champions League qualifying stage =

The 2018 OFC Champions League qualifying stage was played from 20 to 26 January 2018. A total of four teams competed in the qualifying stage to decide two of the 16 places in the group stage of the 2018 OFC Champions League.

== Draw ==
The draw for the qualifying stage was held on 15 September 2017 at the OFC Headquarters in Auckland, New Zealand. The champions of the four developing associations were drawn from Pot A into each of the four positions 1–4 to determine the fixtures.

Pot A
- (American Samoa) Pago Youth
- (Cook Islands) Tupapa Maraerenga (Note: The identity of the teams from Cook Islands, Samoa, and Tonga was not known at the time of the draw.)
- (Samoa) Lupe o le Soaga
- (Tonga) Veitongo

== Format ==
The four teams in the qualifying stage played each other on a round-robin basis at a centralised venue. The winners and runners-up advanced to the group stage to join the 14 direct entrants. According to the group stage draw:

- The qualifying stage winners advanced to Group A.
- The qualifying stage runners-up advanced to Group D.

== Schedule ==
Matches were played between 20 and 26 January 2018 in Pago Pago, American Samoa. The schedule of each matchday was as follows.

Matchday	Dates	Matches
Matchday 1	20 January 2018	Team 4 vs. Team 1, Team 2 vs. Team 3
Matchday 2	23 January 2018	Team 1 vs. Team 3, Team 4 vs. Team 2
Matchday 3	26 January 2018	Team 1 vs. Team 2, Team 3 vs. Team 4

== Matches ==
All times were local, SST (UTC−11).

Pos	Team	Pld	W	D	L	GF	GA	GD	Pts	Qualification	TUP	LUP	VEI	PAG
1	(Cook Islands) Tupapa Maraerenga	3	3	0	0	15	2	+13	9	Group stage	—	1–0	—	—
2	(Samoa) Lupe o le Soaga	3	2	0	1	19	2	+17	6	Group stage	—	—	6–0	—
3	(Tonga) Veitongo	3	1	0	2	4	16	−12	3		2–9	—	—	2–1
4	(American Samoa) Pago Youth (H)	3	0	0	3	2	19	−17	0		0–5	1–13	—	—

Source: OFC
(H) Hosts
20 January 2018
12:00

Tupapa Maraerenga (Cook Islands)	1–0	(Samoa) Lupe o le Soaga
Latimer 74' (pen.)	Report

Pago Park Soccer Stadium, Pago Pago
Attendance: 300
Referee: David Yareboinen (Papua New Guinea)
20 January 2018
15:00

Veitongo (Tonga)	2–1	(American Samoa) Pago Youth
Vea 14'; S. Uhatahi 90'	(Report (OFC)) (Report (GSA-Sport))	Silao 28'

Pago Park Soccer Stadium, Pago Pago
Attendance: 400
Referee: Veer Singh (Fiji)

23 January 2018
12:00

Veitongo (Tonga)	2–9	(Cook Islands) Tupapa Maraerenga
Lutu 35' (pen.), 90+3' (pen.)	Report	Latimer 12', 22', 81'; Fowler 45+2', 90'; Bonsu-Maro 45+3', 55', 90'; Harmon 67'

Pago Park Soccer Stadium, Pago Pago
Attendance: 150
Referee: Peter Linney (New Zealand)
23 January 2018
15:00

Pago Youth (American Samoa)	1–13	(Samoa) Lupe o le Soaga
Ledoux 30'	Report	Toni 9', 25'; S. Ataga 15', 34', 40', 48', 85'; Ah Kuoi 42'; Malo 55'; F. Ataga 69', 90+4'; Kerewi 71'; Fifi'i 75'

Pago Park Soccer Stadium, Pago Pago
Attendance: 200
Referee: Ben Aukwai (Solomon Islands)

26 January 2018
12:00

Lupe o le Soaga (Samoa)	6–0	(Tonga) Veitongo
Vagaia 30', 39'; S. Ataga 38'; Setefano 45+2'; Talilai 54', 84'	Report

Pago Park Soccer Stadium, Pago Pago
Attendance: 200
Referee: Ben Aukwai (Solomon Islands)
26 January 2018
15:00

Pago Youth (American Samoa)	0–5	(Cook Islands) Tupapa Maraerenga
	Report	Bonsu-Maro 7', 59'; Strickland 12', 62'; Latimer 79'

Pago Park Soccer Stadium, Pago Pago
Attendance: 500
Referee: David Yareboinen (Papua New Guinea)
