= 2018 OFC Champions League =

Tournament details
- Host countries: Qualifying stage: American Samoa; Group stage: Vanuatu (Group A); Tahiti (Group B); New Zealand (Group C); Solomon Islands (Group D)
- Dates: Qualifying stage: 20–26 January 2018; Competition proper: 10 February – 20 May 2018
- Teams: Competition proper: 16; Total: 18 (from 11 associations)

Final positions
- Champions: (New Zealand) Team Wellington (1st title)
- Runners-up: (Fiji) Lautoka

Tournament statistics
- Matches played: 40
- Goals scored: 177 (4.43 per match)
- Attendance: 91,636 (2,291 per match)
- Top scorer(s): (New Zealand) Angus Kilkolly (Argentina) Emiliano Tade (8 goals each)
- Best player: (New Caledonia) Roy Kayara
- Best goalkeeper: (Spain) Eñaut Zubikarai
- Fair play award: (New Zealand) Auckland City

The 2018 OFC Champions League was the 17th edition of the Oceanian Club Championship, Oceania's premier club football tournament organized by the Oceania Football Confederation (OFC) and the 12th season under the current OFC Champions League name.

In the final, Team Wellington defeated Lautoka 10–3 on aggregate and qualified as the OFC representative at the 2018 FIFA Club World Cup in the United Arab Emirates. Auckland City are the defending champions, having won the last seven titles straight, but they were eliminated in the semi-finals.

== Format change ==
For this season, the top two teams of each group (instead of only the group winners) in the group stage advanced to the knockout stage, which included a quarter-final round played as a single match hosted by the group winners.

== Teams ==
Location of teams of the 2018 OFC Champions League.
Teams entering the group stage; (H) Group stage host
Teams entering the qualifying stage; (h) Qualifying stage host

A total of 18 teams from all 11 OFC member associations enter the competition.

- The seven developed associations (Fiji, New Caledonia, New Zealand, Papua New Guinea, Solomon Islands, Tahiti, Vanuatu) are awarded two berths each in the group stage.
- The four developing associations (American Samoa, Cook Islands, Samoa, Tonga) are awarded one berth each in the qualifying stage, with the winners and runners-up advancing to the group stage.

Teams entering the group stage
Association	Team	Qualifying method
Fiji	Lautoka	2017 Fiji Premier League champions
Fiji	Ba	2017 Fiji Premier League runners-up
(New Caledonia) New Caledonia	Magenta	2016 New Caledonia Super Ligue champions
(New Caledonia) New Caledonia	Lössi	2016 New Caledonia Super Ligue runners-up
(New Zealand) New Zealand	Team Wellington	2016–17 New Zealand Football Championship finals series champions
(New Zealand) New Zealand	Auckland City	2016–17 New Zealand Football Championship regular season premiers
(Papua New Guinea) Papua New Guinea	Toti City	2017 Papua New Guinea National Soccer League regular season premiers
(Papua New Guinea) Papua New Guinea	Madang	2017 Papua New Guinea National Soccer League regular season runners-up
(Solomon Islands) Solomon Islands	Solomon Warriors	2017–18 Solomon Islands S-League champions
(Solomon Islands) Solomon Islands	Marist	2017–18 Solomon Islands S-League runners-up
(French Polynesia) Tahiti	Dragon	2016–17 Tahiti Ligue 1 champions
(French Polynesia) Tahiti	Vénus	2016–17 Tahiti Ligue 1 runners-up
Vanuatu	Nalkutan	2016–17 VFF National Super League grand final champions
Vanuatu	Erakor Golden Star	2016–17 VFF National Super League grand final runners-up

Teams entering the qualifying stage
Association	Team	Qualifying method
(American Samoa) American Samoa	Pago Youth	2016 FFAS Senior League champions
(Cook Islands) Cook Islands	Tupapa Maraerenga	2017 Cook Islands Round Cup champions
Samoa	Lupe o le Soaga	2017 Samoa National League champions
Tonga	Veitongo	2017 Tonga Major League champions

== Schedule ==
The schedule of the competition was as follows.

Stage	Draw date	Match dates
Qualifying stage	15 September 2017 (Auckland, New Zealand)	20–26 January 2018
Group stage	15 September 2017 (Auckland, New Zealand)	Group A: 10–16 February 2018; Group B: 11–17 February 2018; Group C: 25 February – 3 March 2018; Group D: 24 February – 2 March 2018
Quarter-finals	5 March 2018 (Auckland, New Zealand)	7–8 April 2018
Semi-finals	5 March 2018 (Auckland, New Zealand)	First leg: 22 April 2018; Second leg: 29 April 2018
Final	5 March 2018 (Auckland, New Zealand)	First leg: 13 May 2018; Second leg: 20 May 2018

== Qualifying stage ==
The draw for the qualifying stage was held on 15 September 2017 at the OFC Headquarters in Auckland, New Zealand. The champions of the four developing associations were drawn from Pot A into each of the four positions 1–4 to determine the fixtures. The four teams in the qualifying stage played each other on a round-robin basis at a centralised venue. The winners and runners-up advanced to the group stage to join the 14 direct entrants. Matches were played between 20 and 26 January 2018 in Pago Pago, American Samoa.

Pos	Team	Pld	W	D	L	GF	GA	GD	Pts	Qualification	TUP	LUP	VEI	PAG
1	(Cook Islands) Tupapa Maraerenga	3	3	0	0	15	2	+13	9	Group stage	—	1–0	—	—
2	(Samoa) Lupe o le Soaga	3	2	0	1	19	2	+17	6	Group stage	—	—	6–0	—
3	(Tonga) Veitongo	3	1	0	2	4	16	−12	3		2–9	—	—	2–1
4	(American Samoa) Pago Youth (H)	3	0	0	3	2	19	−17	0		0–5	1–13	—	—

Source: OFC
(H) Hosts

== Group stage ==
The draw for the group stage was held on 15 September 2017 at the OFC Headquarters in Auckland, New Zealand. The 16 teams (14 teams entering the group stage and two teams advancing from the qualifying stage) were drawn into four groups of four, with each group containing two teams from Pot B (which were drawn into positions 1–2 to determine the fixtures) and two teams from Pot C (which were drawn into positions 3–4 to determine the fixtures). Teams from the same association, as well as the two teams advancing from the qualifying stage, could not be drawn into the same group. The teams were seeded based on the following:

- Pot B contained the champions of the seven developed associations, and the runners-up of New Zealand, by virtue of having the best second team in the 2017 OFC Champions League.
- Pot C contained the runners-up of the six developed associations apart from New Zealand, and the two teams advancing from the qualifying stage, whose identity was not known at the time of the draw.

The four teams in each group played each other on a round-robin basis at a centralised venue. The winners and runners-up of each group advanced to the quarter-finals of the knockout stage. The hosts of each group were announced by OFC on 31 October 2017.

- Group A matches were played between 10 and 16 February 2018 in Port Vila, Vanuatu.
- Group B matches were played between 11 and 17 February 2018 in Pirae, Tahiti.
- Group C matches were played between 25 February – 3 March 2018 in Auckland, New Zealand.
- Group D matches were played between 24 February – 2 March 2018 in Honiara, Solomon Islands.

=== Group A ===
Pos	Team	Pld	W	D	L	GF	GA	GD	Pts	Qualification	NAL	TOT	BAF	TUP
1	(Vanuatu) Nalkutan (H)	3	3	0	0	9	1	+8	9	Knockout stage	—	—	1–0	—
2	(Papua New Guinea) Toti City	3	2	0	1	9	6	+3	6	Knockout stage	1–4	—	1–0	—
3	(Fiji) Ba	3	1	0	2	4	3	+1	3		—	—	—	4–1
4	(Cook Islands) Tupapa Maraerenga	3	0	0	3	3	15	−12	0		0–4	2–7	—	—

Source: OFC
(H) Hosts

=== Group B ===
Pos	Team	Pld	W	D	L	GF	GA	GD	Pts	Qualification	DRA	SOL	ERA	LOS
1	(French Polynesia) Dragon (H)	3	2	0	1	9	5	+4	6	Knockout stage	—	—	—	4–0
2	(Solomon Islands) Solomon Warriors	3	2	0	1	8	4	+4	6	Knockout stage	2–1	—	—	6–1
3	(Vanuatu) Erakor Golden Star	3	1	1	1	7	6	+1	4		3–4	2–0	—	—
4	(New Caledonia) Lössi	3	0	1	2	3	12	−9	1		—	—	2–2	—

Source: OFC
(H) Hosts

=== Group C ===
Pos	Team	Pld	W	D	L	GF	GA	GD	Pts	Qualification	AUC	LAU	VEN	MAD
1	(New Zealand) Auckland City (H)	3	3	0	0	13	0	+13	9	Knockout stage	—	1–0	—	5–0
2	(Fiji) Lautoka	3	2	0	1	5	3	+2	6	Knockout stage	—	—	—	3–1
3	(French Polynesia) Vénus	3	1	0	2	3	10	−7	3		0–7	1–2	—	—
4	(Papua New Guinea) Madang	3	0	0	3	2	10	−8	0		—	—	1–2	—

Source: OFC
(H) Hosts

=== Group D ===
Pos	Team	Pld	W	D	L	GF	GA	GD	Pts	Qualification	WEL	MAR	MAG	LUP
1	(New Zealand) Team Wellington	3	2	1	0	13	3	+10	7	Knockout stage	—	—	5–1	7–1
2	(Solomon Islands) Marist (H)	3	1	2	0	5	3	+2	5	Knockout stage	1–1	—	1–1	—
3	(New Caledonia) Magenta	3	1	1	1	4	6	−2	4		—	—	—	2–0
4	(Samoa) Lupe o le Soaga	3	0	0	3	2	12	−10	0		—	1–3	—	—

Source: OFC
(H) Hosts

== Knockout stage ==
The eight teams in the knockout stage played on a single-elimination basis. In the quarter-finals, each tie was played as a single match, while in the semi-finals and final, each tie was played on a home-and-away two-legged basis.

=== Bracket ===
The bracket was decided after the draw for the knockout stage (quarter-finals, semi-finals, and final) was held on 5 March 2018 at the OFC Headquarters in Auckland, New Zealand.

Quarter-finals
(New Zealand) Team Wellington	11
(Papua New Guinea) Toti City	0
(New Zealand) Auckland City	2
(Solomon Islands) Solomon Warriors	0
(French Polynesia) Dragon	1
(Fiji) Lautoka	2
(Vanuatu) Nalkutan	1
(Solomon Islands) Marist	2

Semi-finals
(New Zealand) Team Wellington (a)	0	2	2
(New Zealand) Auckland City	0	2	2
(Fiji) Lautoka	1	1	2
(Solomon Islands) Marist	1	0	1

Final
(New Zealand) Team Wellington	6	4	10
(Fiji) Lautoka	0	3	3

=== Quarter-finals ===
In the quarter-finals, the winners of one group played the runners-up of another group (teams from same group cannot play each other), with the group winners hosting the match, and the matchups decided by draw.

Team 1	Score	Team 2
Team Wellington (New Zealand)	11–0	(Papua New Guinea) Toti City
Auckland City (New Zealand)	2–0	(Solomon Islands) Solomon Warriors
Dragon (French Polynesia)	1–2	(Fiji) Lautoka
Nalkutan (Vanuatu)	1–2	(Solomon Islands) Marist

=== Semi-finals ===
In the semi-finals, the four quarter-final winners played in two ties, with the matchups and order of legs decided by draw.

Team 1	Agg.	Team 2	1st leg	2nd leg
Lautoka (Fiji)	2–1	(Solomon Islands) Marist	1–1	1–0
Team Wellington (New Zealand)	2–2 (a)	(New Zealand) Auckland City	0–0	2–2

=== Final ===
In the final, the two semi-final winners played each other, with the order of legs decided by draw.

13 May 2018
14:00 UTC+12

Team Wellington (New Zealand)	6–0	(Fiji) Lautoka
Allen 16'; Sinclair 57', 71'; Bevin 61'; Barcia 63'; Schrijvers 84'	Report

David Farrington Park, Wellington
Attendance: 1,200
Referee: Abdelkader Zitouni (Tahiti)
20 May 2018
14:00 UTC+12

Lautoka (Fiji)	3–4	(New Zealand) Team Wellington
Totori 52', 84'; Shazil 82'	Report	Radrigai 10' (o.g.); Ilich 32'; Allen 51'; Kilkolly 88'

Churchill Park, Lautoka
Attendance: 1,000
Referee: Norbert Hauata (Tahiti)

Team Wellington won 10–3 on aggregate.

== Top goalscorers ==
Team eliminated / inactive for this round.

Rank	Player	Team	QS1	QS2	QS3	GS1	GS2	GS3	QF	SF1	SF2	F1	F2	Total
1	(New Zealand) Angus Kilkolly	(New Zealand) Team Wellington				1		1	4		1		1	8
1	(Argentina) Emiliano Tade	(New Zealand) Auckland City				3	2	1	1		1			8
2	(England) Ross Allen	(New Zealand) Team Wellington					3	2				1	1	7
2	(England) Sean Latimer	(Cook Islands) Tupapa Maraerenga	1	3	1	1		1						7
4	(Samoa) Suivai Ataga	(Samoa) Lupe o le Soaga		5	1									6
4	(Cook Islands) Maro Bonsu-Maro	(Cook Islands) Tupapa Maraerenga		3	2	1								6
7	(French Polynesia) Tamatoa Tetauira	(French Polynesia) Dragon				2	2		1					5
8	(Papua New Guinea) Raymond Gunemba	(Papua New Guinea) Toti City				4								4
8	(New Zealand) Nathanael Hailemariam	(New Zealand) Team Wellington					1		3					4
8	(Vanuatu) Azariah Soromon	(Vanuatu) Nalkutan					1	3						4
8	(Samoa) Lapalapa Toni	(Samoa) Lupe o le Soaga			2		1	1						4

== Awards ==
The following awards were given at the conclusion of the tournament.

Award	Player	Team
Golden Ball	(New Caledonia) Roy Kayara	(New Zealand) Team Wellington
Golden Boot	(New Zealand) Angus Kilkolly	(New Zealand) Team Wellington
Golden Glove	(Spain) Eñaut Zubikarai	(New Zealand) Auckland City
Fair Play Award	—	(New Zealand) Auckland City

Note: Although Angus Kilkolly and Emiliano Tade both scored eight goals in the competition, Kilkolly won the Golden Boot as he played less minutes than Tade.

== See also ==
- 2018 FIFA Club World Cup
