= Jesse Edge =

New Zealand footballer

Personal information
- Full name: Jesse Marshall Thompson Edge
- Date of birth: 26 February 1995 (age 31)
- Place of birth: Tauranga, New Zealand
- Height: 1.86 m (6 ft 1 in)
- Position: Defender

Team information
- Current team: IFK Berga

Youth career
- –2011: Melville United

Senior career*
Years	Team	Apps	(Gls)
2011–2013	WaiBOP United	19	(0)
2013–2014	Ole FA		
2014–2015	Vicenza Calcio	0	(0)
2015–2016	Auckland City	10	(0)
2016–2017	Písek	15	(0)
2017–2018	Achilles '29	29	(0)
2018–2019	Železiarne Podbrezová	6	(0)
2019	→ Lokomotíva Košice (loan)	9	(1)
2019	→ Petržalka (loan)	1	(0)
2019–2020	DFS	?	(2)
2020–	IFK Berga	2	(1)

International career
2011	New Zealand U-17	4	(0)
2013–2015	New Zealand U-20	10	(0)
- * Club domestic league appearances and goals as of 07:13, 23 August 2020 (UTC)

Jesse Marshall Thompson Edge (born 26 February 1995) is an amateur New Zealand football player who plays in the Swedish amateur Division 1 Norra for IFK Berga. Besides New Zealand, he has played in Sweden, the Netherlands, Slovakia, and Italy mainly as an amateur.

== Club career ==
He made his professional debut in the Eerste Divisie for Achilles '29 on 20 January 2017 in a game against NAC Breda.

He then moved in 2018 to the professional club FK Železiarne Podbrezová in the Slovak First Football League.

Edge left Slovakia in August 2019 after he didn't receive his 300 euros per month salary. He then returned to the Netherlands and went on a trial with DFS, before signing with the club at the end of the month.

In August 2020, he then joined Swedish amateur club IFK Berga in Division 1 Norra

In January 2022, he then joined Swedish amateur club Lunds BK in Division 1 Sodra before moving to IFK Malmo in August until the end of the 2022 season as coach of their under 12 women's team.

== Honours ==
=== Club ===
Waikato FC

- NBF Cup runner-up: 2011–12.

Auckland City

- OFC Champions League champion: 2016.
- New Zealand Football Championship runner-up: 2015–16.

=== International ===
New Zealand national under-20 football team

- OFC U-20 Championship champion: 2013.

== Personal ==
Jesse is a nephew of former New Zealand international Declan Edge.

Declan Edge.[8]
