= White Ribbon Cup =

Association football tournament in New Zealand

- Founded: 2011
- Region: New Zealand
- Teams: 6
- Current champions: Team Wellington (1st title)
- Most championships: Team Wellington (1 title)

The White Ribbon Cup was a knockout cup competition in New Zealand association football. The knockout competition was run by New Zealand Football with the 2011–12 season being both the inaugural and only season of the Cup.

The knockout competition was established in 2011 to provide regular football for the six clubs not participating in the Oceania Champions League (OFC) and runs in conjunction with the ASB Premiership regular season.

== Format ==
The six competing teams were split into two conferences – a Northern and Southern Conference. Each team played two conferences games as a round-robin table format, with the league winner progressing to the national final against the opposing conference winner.

== Clubs ==
Team	City	Stadium	Head coach
Current NZF Cup Clubs
Auckland City FC	Auckland	Kiwitea Street	(Spain) Ramon Tribulietx
Canterbury United	Christchurch	ASB Football Park	(New Zealand) Keith Braithwaite
Hawke's Bay United	Napier	Bluewater Stadium	(England) Matt Chandler
Otago United	Dunedin	Forsyth Barr Stadium	(New Zealand) Richard Murray
Team Wellington	Wellington	Newtown Park	(New Zealand) Matt Calcott
Waikato FC	Hamilton	Porritt Stadium	(New Zealand) Declan Edge
Waitakere United	West Auckland	Fred Taylor Park	(England) Neil Emblen
YoungHeart Manawatu	Palmerston North	Memorial Park	(New Zealand) Stu Jacobs
