= Olé Football Academy =

Association football academy in New Zealand

- Established: 1997
- Location: Wellington, New Zealand
- Coordinates: 41.13997°S 174.83254°E
- Website: https://olefootballacademy.co.nz/

The Olé Football Academy, commonly referred to as Olé, is an association football centre based in the city of Porirua in the Wellington Region, New Zealand. Considered the premier football academy in New Zealand, Olé are currently represented at the senior level by Central Premier League side Western Suburbs, and have produced a number of New Zealand internationals in both men's and women's football. Founded in 1997 by Dave Wilson and his son, Michael, the academy was directed by Declan Edge from 2012 to 2020. 2020- 2022 the Technical Director was Ben Sippola. As of 2023, the new Technical Director is Alan Koch who has taken over the management of the academy. Coach Koch is also the head coach of Western Suburbs Football Club.

Olé Football Academy shares a partnership with Western Suburbs. Prior to this, Olé partnered with ISPS Handa Premiership club Eastern Suburbs for the 2018–19 season, in which Eastern Suburbs won the title for the first time in their history – a success largely attributed to the Olé academy, whose graduates consisted of the majority of the team.

== Notable graduates ==
The academy's two most notable graduates are current PSV Eindhoven midfielder Ryan Thomas and Beşiktaş winger Tyler Boyd. Others listed are either current internationals, or have represented a professional team outside New Zealand following graduation from Olé Football Academy.

Name	Nationality	Position	Current club	Caps
Kyle Adams	New Zealand	Defender	(United States) San Diego Loyal	1
Noah Billingsley	New Zealand	Defender	(New Zealand) Auckland United	3
Tyler Boyd	New Zealand; United States	Forward	(United States) LA Galaxy	5 (Note: Boyd last represented New Zealand in 2014; since 2019, he has represented the United States national team.)
Elliot Collier	New Zealand	Forward	(United States) San Diego Loyal	2
Maya Hahn	New Zealand; Germany	Midfielder	(Germany) Turbine Potsdam	0
Matthew Garbett	New Zealand	Midfielder	(Netherlands) NAC Breda	14
Elijah Just	New Zealand	Forward	(Scotland) Motherwell	15
Callum McCowatt	New Zealand	Forward	(Denmark) Silkeborg	11
Nando Pijnaker	New Zealand	Defender	(New Zealand) Auckland FC	13
Kees Sims	New Zealand	Goalkeeper	(Sweden) GAIS	0
Marko Stamenić	New Zealand	Midfielder	(Wales) Swansea City	21
Ryan Thomas	New Zealand	Midfielder	(Netherlands) PEC Zwolle	19
Dalton Wilkins	New Zealand	Defender	(Denmark) Kolding	1
