= Dave Farrington =

New Zealand football manager

Personal information
- Full name: David Allan Farrington
- Date of birth: 9 December 1948
- Place of birth: New Zealand
- Date of death: 17 December 2008 (aged 60)
- Place of death: Newtown, New Zealand
- Position: Midfielder

Youth career
- 1957–: Miramar Rangers

Senior career*
Years	Team	Apps	(Gls)
	Miramar Rangers	178	(?)

Managerial career
- Miramar Rangers
- Miramar Rangers Women
- 1975–1979: New Zealand Women
- –2004: Miramar Rangers
- * Club domestic league appearances and goals

David Allan Farrington (12 December 1948 – 17 December 2008) was a New Zealand football manager.

== Playing career ==
Born on 12 December 1948, Farrington joined Miramar Rangers at the age of eight in 1957. He went on to make 178 appearances for the first team.

== Managerial career ==
Having retired as a player, Farrington went into management, and in 1975 he was named as the first manager of the New Zealand women's national football team. New Zealand had been invited to compete in the 1975 AFC Women's Championship in Hong Kong, and despite it being their first excursion in international football, they won the competition, beating Australia 3–2 in the final.

He also coached the club he had played for his entire career, Miramar Rovers, as well as the club's women's team. In 1986 he was named New Zealand coach of the year. With Miramar Rovers, he won the 2002 and 2003 New Zealand National Soccer Leagues, and the 2004 Chatham Cup, as well as winning five league titles with the women's side.

Following his spell with Miramar Rovers, Farrington moved into football administration, sitting on the board of newly-formed club Team Wellington. In 2007 he was named General Manager of the New Zealand Football Championship, a role he would hold until his death a year later.

== Death ==
Farrington died at the Mary Potter Hospice in Newtown, Wellington on 17 December 2008, following a lengthy battle with cancer. In 2009, Miramar Rangers's home ground was renamed the David Farrington Park in his honour.

== Managerial statistics ==
Managerial record by team and tenure
Team	From	To	Record								PPM
Team	From	To	P	W	D	L	GF	GA	GD	Win %	PPM
New Zealand Women	1975	1979	7	5	1	1	14	6	+8	71.43	2.14
Total			7	5	1	1	14	6	+8	71.43	
