= 2008–09 New Zealand Football Championship =

NZFC 2008–09
- League: New Zealand Football Championship
- Sport: Association football
- Duration: 2008–2009
- Teams: 8

NZFC season
- Champions: Auckland City FC
- Premiers: Waitakere United
- Top scorer: Luis Corrales (12)

Youth League
- Champions: Auckland City FC

NZFC seasons
- ← 2007–08 2009–10 →

The NZFC 2008–09 season is the fifth season of the New Zealand Football Championship competition.

The previous season's champion, Waitakere United, and second-ranked club Auckland City FC will also be competing in the 2008-09 O-League which will run alongside the NZFC season.

== Changes for 2008/09 ==
- The league format will change from three-round, 21-match system to a two-round, 14-match home and away system.
- The playoff system will be changed to home-and-away semifinals contested by the top four teams, followed by a one-match Grand Final. The Premier will no longer receive a bye to the final.
- Otago United will now play their home fixtures at Sunnyvale Park, moving from Carisbrook.
- YoungHeart Manawatu will now play their home fixtures at Memorial Park, moving from FMG Stadium
- Due to financial issues, Waikato FC will now play their home fixtures at Centennial Park in Ngaruawahia, moving from Waikato Stadium in Hamilton. It is expected the club will return to Hamilton the following season.
- Waitakere United will permanently return to Douglas Field, after spending the majority of the previous season at Fred Taylor Park.

== Team locations ==
Location of teams in the 2008-09 New Zealand Football Championship

== Participating clubs ==
Club Name	Home City	Stadium	2008-09 Placing	Notes
Auckland City FC	Auckland	Kiwitea Street	2nd	2008-09 Championship; O-League 2009–10
Canterbury United	Christchurch	English Park	8th	2008-09 Wooden Spoon
Hawke's Bay United	Napier	Bluewater Stadium	5th	
Otago United	Dunedin	Sunnyvale Park	7th	
Team Wellington	Wellington	Newtown Park	4th	Lost in semifinals to Waitakere United
Waikato FC	Ngaruawahia	Centennial Park	6th	
Waitakere United	Waitakere City	Douglas Field	1st	2008-09 Premiership; O-League 2009–10
YoungHeart Manawatu	Palmerston North	Memorial Park	3rd	Lost in semi-finals to Auckland City FC

== League table ==
Pos	Team	Pld	W	D	L	GF	GA	GD	Pts	Qualification
1	Waitakere United	14	10	3	1	30	12	+18	33	Qualified for the Finals and Champions League
2	Auckland City (C)	14	8	1	5	27	15	+12	25	Qualified for the Finals and Champions League
3	YoungHeart Manawatu	14	7	2	5	22	19	+3	23	Qualified for the Finals
4	Team Wellington	14	7	2	5	28	28	0	23	Qualified for the Finals
5	Hawke's Bay United	14	7	1	6	24	17	+7	22	
6	Waikato FC	14	6	1	7	19	22	−3	19	
7	Otago United	14	2	2	10	16	32	−16	8	
8	Canterbury United	14	2	2	10	11	32	−21	8	

(C) Champions

== Competition Schedule ==
=== Round 1 ===
Home	Score	Away	Match Information
Home	Score	Away	Date	Venue	Reports
Canterbury United	0 – 1	YoungHeart Manawatu	8 November 2008	English Park	(Report)
Auckland City FC	2 – 0	Otago United	9 November 2008	Kiwitea Street	(Report)
Hawke's Bay United	2 – 1	Waikato FC	9 November 2008	Bluewater Stadium	(Report)
Team Wellington	2 – 4	Waitakere United	9 November 2008	Newtown Park	(Report)

=== Round 2 ===
Home	Score	Away	Match Information
Home	Score	Away	Date	Venue	Reports
Waikato FC	1 – 3	Auckland City FC	15 November 2008	Centennial Park	(Report)
YoungHeart Manawatu	3 – 0	Team Wellington	15 November 2008	Memorial Park	(Report)
Otago United	2 – 1	Canterbury United	15 November 2008	Sunnyvale Park	(Report)
Hawke's Bay United	0 – 1	Waitakere United	16 November 2009	Douglas Field	(Report)

=== Round 3 ===
Home	Score	Away	Match Information
Home	Score	Away	Date	Venue	Reports
Hawke's Bay United	1 – 2	Team Wellington	23 November 2008	Bluewater Stadium	(Report)
Otago United	2 – 3	YoungHeart Manawatu	23 November 2008	Sunnyvale Park	(Report)
Canterbury United	0 – 1	Waikato FC	23 November 2008	English Park	(Report)
Auckland City FC	1 – 2	Waitakere United	26 November 2008	Kiwitea Street	(Report)

=== Round 4 ===
Home	Score	Away	Match Information
Home	Score	Away	Date	Venue	Reports
YoungHeart Manawatu	1 – 2	Hawke's Bay United	29 November 2008	Memorial Park	(Report)
Waitakere United	1 – 1	Canterbury United	29 November 2008	Douglas Field	(Report)
Team Wellington	2 – 1	Auckland City FC	29 November 2008	Newtown Park	(Report)
Waikato FC	3 – 1	Otago United	30 November 2008	Centennial Park	(Report)

=== Round 5 ===
Home	Score	Away	Match Information
Home	Score	Away	Date	Venue	Reports
Auckland City FC	3 – 1	Hawke's Bay United	6 December 2008	Kiwitea Street	(Report)
Waikato FC	2 – 0	YoungHeart Manawatu	7 December 2008	Centennial Park	(Report)
Canterbury United	2 – 2	Team Wellington	7 December 2008	English Park	(Report)
Otago United	2 – 3	Waitakere United	22 February 2009	Sunnyvale Park	(Report)

=== Round 6 ===
Home	Score	Away	Match Information
Home	Score	Away	Date	Venue	Reports
Hawke's Bay United	1 – 2	Canterbury United	14 December 2008	Bluewater Stadium	(Report)
Team Wellington	1 – 0	Otago United	14 December 2008	Newtown Park	(Report)
Waitakere United	2 – 0	Waikato FC	26 January 2009	Douglas Field	(Report)
YoungHeart Manawatu	0 – 0	Auckland City FC	21 February 2009	Memorial Park	(Report)

=== Round 7 ===
Home	Score	Away	Match Information
Home	Score	Away	Date	Venue	Reports
Waitakere United	3 – 0	YoungHeart Manawatu	21 December 2008	Douglas Field	(Report)
Waikato FC	2 – 0	Team Wellington	21 December 2008	Centennial Park	(Report)
Otago United	1 – 3	Hawke's Bay United	21 December 2008	Sunnyvale Park	(Report)
Canterbury United	2 – 1	Auckland City FC	21 December 2008	English Park	(Report)

=== Round 8 ===
Home	Score	Away	Match Information
Home	Score	Away	Date	Venue	Reports
YoungHeart Manawatu	4 – 0	Canterbury United	10 January 2009	Memorial Park	(Report)
Waikato FC	0 – 1	Hawke's Bay United	11 January 2009	Centennial Park	(Report)
Waitakere United	2 – 0	Team Wellington	11 January 2009	Douglas Field	(Report)
Otago United	0 – 1	Auckland City FC	11 January 2009	Sunnyvale Park	(Report)

=== Round 9 ===
Home	Score	Away	Match Information
Home	Score	Away	Date	Venue	Reports
Auckland City FC	3 – 0	Waikato FC	17 January 2009	Kiwitea Street	(Report)
Waitakere United	0 – 0	Hawke's Bay United	18 January 2009	Douglas Field	(Report)
Team Wellington	3 – 2	YoungHeart Manawatu	18 January 2009	Newtown Park	(Report)
Canterbury United	1 – 2	Otago United	18 January 2009	English Park	(Report)

=== Round 10 ===
Home	Score	Away	Match Information
Home	Score	Away	Date	Venue	Reports
YoungHeart Manawatu	2 – 0	Otago United	24 January 2009	Memorial Park	(Report)
Waitakere United	4 – 2	Auckland City FC	24 January 2009	Douglas Field	(Report)
Waikato FC	3 – 1	Canterbury United	24 January 2009	Centennial Park	(Report)
Team Wellington	2 – 5	Hawke's Bay United	25 January 2009	Newtown Park	(Report)

=== Round 11 ===
Home	Score	Away	Match Information
Home	Score	Away	Date	Venue	Reports
Auckland City FC	1 – 3	Team Wellington	31 January 2009	Kiwitea Street	(Report)
Hawke's Bay United	2 – 3	YoungHeart Manawatu	1 February 2009	Bluewater Stadium	(Report)
Otago United	3 – 3	Waikato FC	1 February 2009	Sunnyvale Park	(Report)
Canterbury United	0 – 2	Waitakere United	1 February 2009	English Park	(Report)

=== Round 12 ===
Home	Score	Away	Match Information
Home	Score	Away	Date	Venue	Reports
Waitakere United	3 – 0	Otago United	6 February 2009	Douglas Field	(Report)
Hawke's Bay United	0 – 1	Auckland City FC	6 February 2009	Bluewater Stadium	(Report)
YoungHeart Manawatu	1 – 0	Waikato FC	14 February 2009	Memorial Park	(Report)
Team Wellington	3 – 1	Canterbury United	22 February 2009	Newtown Park	(Report)

=== Round 13 ===
Home	Score	Away	Match Information
Home	Score	Away	Date	Venue	Reports
Auckland City FC	3 – 0	YoungHeart Manawatu	8 February 2009	Kiwitea Street	(Report)
Waikato FC	2 – 1	Waitakere United	8 February 2009	Centennial Park	(Report)
Otago United	2 – 4	Team Wellington	8 February 2009	Sunnyvale Park	(Report)
Canterbury United	0 – 4	Hawke's Bay United	8 February 2009	English Park	(Report)

=== Round 14 ===
Home	Score	Away	Match Information
Home	Score	Away	Date	Venue	Reports
Auckland City FC	5 – 0	Canterbury United	1 March 2009	Kiwitea Street	(Report)
YoungHeart Manawatu	2 – 2	Waitakere United	1 March 2009	Memorial Park	(Report)
Hawke's Bay United	2 – 0	Otago United	1 March 2009	Bluewater Stadium	(Report)
Team Wellington	4 – 1	Waikato FC	1 March 2009	Newtown Park	(Report)

== Finals ==
=== Bracket ===
Elimination Final
4 Team Wellington	0	0	0
1 Waitakere United	1	5	6
3 YoungHeart Manawatu	3	0	3
2 Auckland City	1	3	4

Grand Final
1 Waitakere United	1
2 Auckland City	2

=== Semi-final - 1st leg ===
Home	Score	Away	Match Information
Home	Score	Away	Date	Venue	Reports
Team Wellington	0 – 1	Waitakere United	14 March 2009	Newtown Park	(Report)
YoungHeart Manawatu	3 – 1	Auckland City FC	15 March 2009	Memorial Park	(Report)

=== Semi-final - 2nd leg ===
Home	Score	Away	Match Information
Home	Score	Away	Date	Venue	Reports
Waitakere United	5 – 0 (agg. 6 – 0)	Team Wellington	21 March 2009	Douglas Field	(Report)
Auckland City FC	3 – 0 (agg. 4 – 3)	YoungHeart Manawatu	22 March 2009	Kiwitea Street	(Report)

=== Grand final ===
Home	Score	Away	Match Information
Home	Score	Away	Date	Venue	Reports
Waitakere United	1–2	Auckland City FC	29 March 2009	Douglas Field	(Report)
