= José Figueira =

English football manager (born 1982)

Personal information
- Full name: José Manuel Figueira
- Date of birth: 9 February 1982 (age 44)
- Place of birth: Crawley, England

Youth career
- Years: Team
- –2001: Crawley Town

Managerial career
- 2008–2011: Auckland City (youth)
- 2012–2013: New York Red Bulls (youth coach)
- 2014–2016: Central United
- 2014–2015: New Zealand U17
- 2015–2016: Auckland City (youth)
- 2016–2019: Team Wellington
- 2018–2019: New Zealand U17
- 2018–2019: New Zealand (assistant)
- 2019–2021: Auckland City
- 2021–2025: Auckland United
- 2026–: New Zealand U20

José Manuel Figueira (born 9 February 1982) is an English football coach, who is the current manager of Northern League club Auckland United. Figueira previously held notable roles as the head coach of Team Wellington, assistant coach of the New Zealand national team, and head coach of the New Zealand under-17 national team.

In his short managerial career, Figueira has won multiple domestic and international competitions, including the New Zealand Football Championship, OFC Champions League, OFC U-17 Championship and the National Youth League.

== Career ==
Born in Crawley, England to Spanish parents. Figueira initially began his career as a player, playing for the youth side of local club Crawley Town, but quit at the age of 19 to pursue a career in coaching, arriving in New Zealand in 2003 following a short stint coaching at the academy of Brighton & Hove Albion.

Figueira was announced as head coach of the New Zealand under-17 national team in preparation for the 2015 OFC U-17 Championship; however, after winning the tournament, he was controversially sacked despite winning all seven games and lifting the title. He was reappointed in 2018, as well as being named assistant manager to Fritz Schmid for the New Zealand senior team. Despite a shock 5–0 loss to the Solomon Islands, Figueira and New Zealand lifted the 2018 OFC U-16 Championship title.

In 2016, Figueira was announced as the new manager of defending ISPS Handa Premiership champions Team Wellington; he immediately led them to another title in the 2016–17 season at his first attempt. This led to him being named New Zealand Football Coach of the Year in 2017. Under Figueira, Team Wellington won the 2018 OFC Champions League, qualifying the club for their first ever FIFA Club World Cup; the club was knocked out on penalties to Al-Ain in the playoff round after a 3–3 draw.

== Honours ==
Team Wellington

- OFC Champions League: 2018
- New Zealand Football Championship: 2017

Auckland City FC

- National Youth League: 2009

Central United F.C.

- Lotto NRFL Men's Premier Division: 2016

New Zealand U17

- OFC U-17 Championship: 2015
- OFC U-16 Championship: 2018
