= Maro Bonsu-Maro =

Personal information
- Date of birth: 26 February 1997 (age 29)
- Place of birth: Auckland, New Zealand
- Height: 1.78 m (5 ft 10 in)
- Position: Forward

Youth career
- –2014: Central United
- 2014–2017: Auckland City

Senior career*
| Years | Team | Apps | (Gls) |
| 2017 | Puaikura | 3 | (1) |
| 2017–2018 | Central United | | |
| 2018 | Tupapa Maraerenga | | |
| 2018–2021 | Auckland City | 25 | (7) |
| 2021–2023 | Manukau United | 30 | (14) |
| 2023–2025 | Coffrane | | |
| 2025 | Westvale Olympic | | |

International career
| 2013 | Cook Islands U17 | 8 | (2) |
- * Club domestic league appearances and goals

Maro Bonsu-Maro (born 26 February 1997) is a Cook Islands footballer who most recently played for Westvale Olympic in the Victorian State League Division 1 North-West.

== Club career ==
Bonsu-Maro competed in the 2017 OFC Champions League with Puaikura. He scored three goals in the Qualifying Stage. Later that year he joined Central United of the NRFL Premier. The following year he joined another Cook Islands club, Tupapa Maraerenga, and competed in the 2018 OFC Champions League. He went on to score a hattrick against Veitongo of Tonga and a brace against Pago Youth of American Samoa. He went on to score against Papua New Guinea's Lae City in the group stage. For the next season he joined Auckland City of the New Zealand Football Championship. He remained with the club through the 2021 season when he joined Manukau United of the New Zealand National League.

In 2023, Maro-Bonsu signed a professional contract with FC Coffrane in Switzerland's 1. Liga Classic. His performances included a goal against FC La Sarraz-Eclépens which helped Coffrane secure the 2–1 victory. His time at the club came to an end in 2025 after suffering a torn Achilles tendon which almost ended his playing career.

== International career ==
Bonsu-Maro represented the Cook Islands, the country of his mother's birth, at the youth level. He was part of the squad that competed in the 2013 OFC U-17 Championship in Vanuatu. He scored two goals in the team's opening match against Tonga. In 2019 he was included in the under-20 squad for the 2016 OFC U-20 Championship but ultimately did not compete. In March 2022, Bonsu-Maro was included in the Cook Islands senior squad for 2022 FIFA World Cup qualification.

=== International career statistics ===
Cook Islands
| Year | Apps | Goals |
|---|---|---|
| 2022 | 0 | 0 |
| Total | 0 | 0 |

== Personal life ==
Bonsu-Maro was born in Auckland, New Zealand to a Pukapukan mother and a Ghanaian father. In 2020, he launched his own sport sock brand known as Best Grip which has been worn by more than 20,000 athletes around the world including All Blacks, All Whites, and National Rugby League players. As of 2026, he lives in Melbourne.
