= Stu Jacobs =

New Zealand footballer and manager

Personal information
- Full name: Stuart R Jacobs
- Date of birth: 25 October 1965 (age 61)
- Place of birth: New Zealand
- Position: Midfielder

Senior career*
| Years | Team | Apps | (Gls) |
| 1984–2000 | Miramar Rangers | 220 | |

International career
| 1988–1997 | New Zealand | 16 | (0) |

Managerial career
- 2008: New Zealand U-23
- 2007–2011: Team Wellington
- 2011–2014: YoungHeart Manawatu
- 2014–2016: Central Coast Mariners (youth)
- 2024–: Island Bay United
- * Club domestic league appearances and goals

Stu Jacobs (born 25 October 1965) is a New Zealand association football player and manager who represented New Zealand and coached the New Zealand Men's Olympic team at the 2008 Olympic Games in Beijing. In October 2016 he was awarded Capital Football Federation's Coach of the Year award for leading Wellington Olympic to victory winning the Central League competition.

== Playing career ==
Jacobs made his full All Whites debut in a 0–2 loss to Fiji on 25 November 1988 and ended his international playing career with 16 A-international caps to his credit, his final cap being in a 0–5 loss to Indonesia on 21 September 1997.

== Coaching career ==
Jacobs moved into football management after his playing career ended and was the head coach of the New Zealand "Olywhites" Olympic team at the 2008 Olympic Games in Beijing.

On 14 January 2024, Island Bay United announced Jacobs would be their first team manager for the 2024 season.
