= Eric Molloy =

Irish footballer

Personal information
- Full name: Eric Keith Molloy
- Date of birth: 12 December 1992 (age 33)
- Place of birth: Carlow, Ireland
- Height: 1.83 m (6 ft 0 in)
- Positions: Midfielder; winger

Senior career*
| Years | Team | Apps | (Gls) |
- Arklow Town
| 2012–2016 | Wexford | 103 | (15) |
| 2016–2017 | Southern United | 15 | (6) |
| 2017–2019 | Team Wellington | 27 | (3) |
| 2019–2020 | Stomil Olsztyn | 12 | (0) |
| 2021 | Waterford | 9 | (2) |
| 2021 | Shelbourne | 6 | (0) |
| 2022 | Longford Town | 27 | (2) |
| 2024–2025 | Killeshin | 4 | (3) |
| 2025– | Bray Wanderers | 0 | (0) |
- * Club domestic league appearances and goals as of 14:06, 11 March 2025 (UTC)

Eric Molloy (born 12 December 1992) is an Irish professional footballer who plays as a midfielder or winger for League of Ireland First Division club Bray Wanderers.

== Career ==
Molloy was born in Carlow, Ireland. He started his senior career with Arklow Town. After that, he played for Wexford, Southern United, and Team Wellington. In 2019, he signed for Stomil Olsztyn in the Polish I liga. Molloy returned to home and signed for League of Ireland Premier Division club Waterford on 25 March 2021. He made his debut a day later in a 2–1 loss to Sligo Rovers. Molloy signed for League of Ireland First Division club Shelbourne on 22 July 2021. Having been released by Shels at the end of the 2021 season, Molloy joined Longford Town for the 2022 campaign.

After leaving Longford at the end of 2022, Molloy started playing gaelic football for the team in his hometown of Carlow in 2023.

In July 2024, he became a player-assistant manager of Killeshin FC.

On 11 March 2025, Molloy signed for League of Ireland First Division club Bray Wanderers.

== Career statistics ==
As of match played on 11 January 2025

Appearances and goals by club, season and competition
| Club | Season | League | | | National cup (Note: Includes FAI Cup, Chatham Cup & Polish Cup) | | League cup (Note: Includes League of Ireland Cup) | | Continental | | Other | | Total | |
| Club | Season | Division | Apps | Goals | Apps | Goals | Apps | Goals | Apps | Goals | Apps | Goals | Apps | Goals |
|---|---|---|---|---|---|---|---|---|---|---|---|---|---|---|
| Wexford | 2012 | League of Ireland First Division | 12 | 1 | 3 | 0 | 0 | 0 | — | | 0 (Note: Appearances in the Leinster Senior Cup) | 0 | 15 | 1 |
| Wexford | 2013 | League of Ireland First Division | 23 | 5 | 1 | 1 | 1 | 0 | — | | 0 | 0 | 25 | 6 |
| Wexford | 2014 | League of Ireland First Division | 24 | 4 | 2 | 0 | 2 | 0 | — | | 0 | 0 | 28 | 4 |
| Wexford | 2015 | League of Ireland First Division | 21 | 3 | 1 | 0 | 0 | 0 | — | | 1 | 1 | 23 | 4 |
| Wexford | 2016 | League of Ireland Premier Division | 23 | 2 | 2 | 1 | 1 | 0 | — | | 2 | 4 | 28 | 7 |
| Wexford | Total | | 103 | 15 | 9 | 2 | 1 | 0 | — | | 3 | 5 | 119 | 22 |
| Southern United | 2016–17 | New Zealand Football Championship | 15 | 6 | 0 | 0 | — | | — | | — | | 15 | 6 |
| Team Wellington | 2017–18 | New Zealand Football Championship | 19 | 1 | 0 | 0 | — | | 8 (Note: Appearances in the OFC Champions League) | 2 | 1 (Note: Appearances in the Charity Cup) | 0 | 28 | 3 |
| Team Wellington | 2018–19 | New Zealand Football Championship | 12 | 2 | 0 | 0 | — | | 4 | 0 | 1 (Note: Appearances in the FIFA Club World Cup) | 0 | 17 | 2 |
| Team Wellington | Total | | 31 | 3 | 0 | 0 | — | | 12 | 2 | 2 | 0 | 45 | 5 |
| Stomil Olsztyn | 2019–20 | I liga | 12 | 0 | 3 | 0 | — | | — | | — | | 15 | 0 |
| Waterford | 2021 | League of Ireland Premier Division | 9 | 2 | — | | — | | — | | — | | 9 | 2 |
| Shelbourne | 2021 | League of Ireland First Division | 6 | 0 | 1 | 0 | — | | — | | — | | 7 | 0 |
| Longford Town | 2022 | League of Ireland First Division | 27 | 2 | 0 | 0 | — | | — | | — | | 27 | 2 |
| Killeshin | 2024–25 | Carlow & District Football League | 4 | 3 | — | | — | | — | | 1 (Note: Appearance in the Carlow & District Football League Shield) | 0 | 5 | 3 |
| Bray Wanderers | 2025 | League of Ireland First Division | 0 | 0 | 0 | 0 | — | | — | | 0 | 0 | 0 | 0 |
| Career total | | | 205 | 31 | 13 | 2 | 4 | 0 | 12 | 2 | 6 | 5 | 247 | 40 |

== Honours ==
Wexford

- League of Ireland First Division: 2015

Team Wellington

- Charity Cup: 2017
- OFC Champions League: 2018

Shelbourne

- League of Ireland First Division: 2021
