= Andy Bevin =

New Zealand footballer (born 1992)

Personal information
- Full name: Andrew Francis Bevin
- Date of birth: 16 May 1992 (age 34)
- Place of birth: New Zealand
- Height: 1.75 m (5 ft 9 in)
- Position: Midfielder

Team information
- Current team: Miramar Rangers
- Number: 12

College career
Years	Team	Apps	(Gls)
2011–2014	West Virginia Mountaineers	75	(31)

Senior career*
Years	Team	Apps	(Gls)
2008–2011	Hawke's Bay United	14	(9)
2011	Waitakere United	4	(0)
2012	APIA Leichhardt	?	(7)
2015	South Melbourne	6	(0)
2015–2021	Team Wellington	94	(25)
2021–	Miramar Rangers	39	(8)
- * Club domestic league appearances and goals

Andrew Francis Bevin (born 16 May 1992) is a New Zealand footballer who plays as a midfielder for Miramar Rangers.

== Early life ==
Bevin was born in 1992 in New Zealand. He is a native of Napier, New Zealand.

== Education ==
Bevin attended Napier Boy's High School in New Zealand. After that, he attended the business program at West Virginia University in the United States after he was scouted by coach Marlon LeBlanc. Bevin played for the Mountaineers for four years and totaled 31 goals in 75 appearances.

== Club career ==
Bevin signed for Australian club APIA Leichhardt FC for the 2012 season, top-scoring for the club with 7 goals. He left the club for the US in August that year.

In the 2015 MLS SuperDraft, Bevin was selected 80th overall by Seattle Sounders FC. He did not sign with the Sounders and instead traveled to South Melbourne FC and signed for them in May.

In 2015, Bevin signed for New Zealand side Team Wellington. He helped the club win the 2018 OFC Champions League.

== International career ==
Bevin is a New Zealand youth international. He played for the New Zealand national under-20 football team at the 2011 FIFA U-20 World Cup.

== Style of play ==
Bevin mainly operates as a midfielder. He is known for his versatility.

== Personal life ==
Bevin is the son of Theresa and Sean Bevin. He has an older brother.

== Honours ==
Individual

- Steve Sumner Trophy: 2020–21
