= Dalton Wilkins =

New Zealand footballer (born 1999)

Personal information
- Full name: Dalton James Wilkins
- Date of birth: 15 April 1999 (age 27)
- Place of birth: New Zealand
- Height: 1.81 m (5 ft 11 in)
- Position: Left-back

Team information
- Current team: Sønderjyske
- Number: 13

Youth career
- Team Wellington
- Auckland City

Senior career*
Years	Team	Apps	(Gls)
2018	Auckland City	2	(0)
2018–2019	Eastern Suburbs	19	(0)
2019–2022	Helsingør	5	(0)
2021	→ Kolding (loan)	6	(1)
2022–2024	Kolding	56	(4)
2024–	Sønderjyske	25	(0)
2025	→ Kolding (loan)	2	(0)

International career^{‡}
2022–	New Zealand	2	(0)
- * Club domestic league appearances and goals as of 19 May 2026 ‡ National team caps and goals as of 19 March 2022

Dalton Wilkins (born 15 April 1999) is a New Zealand professional footballer who plays as a left-back for Danish Superliga club Sønderjyske and the New Zealand national team.

== Club career ==
Wilkins began his career in New Zealand with Auckland City and Eastern Suburbs. In 2019, he moved to Denmark with Helsingør, and then a short loan with Kolding IF in 2019. He transferred permanently to Kolding on 25 January 2022.

On 11 January 2024, Sønderjyske announced the signing of Wilkins on a contract until June 2027. On 30 August 2025, Wilkins returned to Kolding IF, joining the club on a one-year loan deal. In mid-January 2026, Wilkins suddenly appeared at Sønderjyske’s training camp in Spain, leading to the assumption that the loan agreement with Kolding had been terminated.

== International career ==
Wilkins debuted with the New Zealand national team in a 3–1 friendly loss to Jordan on 28 January 2022.

== Career statistics ==
=== Club ===
Appearances and goals by club, season and competition
Club	Season	League			Cup		Others		Total	
Club	Season	Division	Apps	Goals	Apps	Goals	Apps	Goals	Apps	Goals
Auckland City	2017–18	NZ Premiership	1	0	—		5 (Note: Four appearances, two goals in OFC Champions League; one appearance, one goal in New Zealand Football Championship play-offs)	3	6	3
Eastern Suburbs	2018–19	NZ Premiership	17	1	—		2 (Note: Appearances in New Zealand Football Championship play-offs)	0	19	1
Helsingør	2019–20	Danish 2nd Division	11	0	—		—		11	0
Helsingør	2020–21	Danish 1st Division	2	0	—		—		2	0
Helsingør	2021–22	Danish 1st Division	3	0	1	0	—		4	0
Helsingør	Total						—			
Kolding (loan)	2021–22	Danish 2nd Division	19	2	3	0	—		22	2
Kolding	2022–23	Danish 2nd Division	24	1	2	0	—		26	1
Kolding	2023–24	Danish 1st Division	16	2	1	0	—		17	1
Kolding	Total						—			
Sønderjyske	2023–24	Danish 1st Division	9	0	—		—		9	0
Sønderjyske	2024–25	Danish Superliga	9	0	—		—		9	0
Sønderjyske	2025–26	Danish Superliga	7	0	—		—		7	0
Sønderjyske	2026–27	Danish Superliga	0	0	0	0	—		0	0
Sønderjyske	Total						—			
Kolding (loan)	2025–26	Danish 1st Division	2	0	2	0	—		4	0
Career total										
