= Declan Edge =

Footballer (born 1965)

Personal information
- Full name: Declan John Edge
- Date of birth: 18 September 1965 (age 61)
- Place of birth: Malacca Town, Malaysia
- Height: 5 ft 10 in (1.78 m)
- Position: Forward

Team information
- Current team: Torslanda IK (manager)

Senior career*
Years	Team	Apps	(Gls)
1983	Mount Maunganui	14	(1)
1983–1984	Shrewsbury Town	0	(0)
1984–1985	Mount Maunganui	23	(5)
1985	Gisborne City	7	(2)
1985–1987	Notts County	10	(2)
1986	→ Gisborne City (loan)	9	(2)
1987–1989	Mount Maunganui		
1989–1990	Adelaide City	4	(0)
1990	Waikato United		
1991	Napier City Rovers	7	(2)
1991–1995?	Waikato United		
- Hamilton Wanderers

International career
1985–1991	New Zealand	26	(1)

Managerial career
- 2004–2006: Waikato FC
- 2011–2012: Waikato FC
- 2012–: Olé Football Academy
- 2016: Vanuatu U20 (technical advisor)
- 2019–: Torslanda IK
- * Club domestic league appearances and goals

Declan John Edge (born 18 September 1965) is a former professional footballer who is the current manager of Swedish club Torslanda IK. Born in Malaysia to English parents, Edge represented the New Zealand national team in the 1980s and 1990s.

Edge is considered one of the premier developers of footballing talent in New Zealand, acting as technical director for the Olé Football Academy and developing players such as Ryan Thomas and Tyler Boyd.

== Playing career ==
Edge made his full All Whites debut as a substitute in a 5–0 win over Fiji on 3 June 1985 and ended his international playing career with 26 A-international caps and 1 goal to his credit, his final cap an appearance in a 2–0 loss to England on 8 June 1991.

== Coaching career ==
- Tauranga City FC assistant coach
- Melville United assistant coach
- Waikato FC
- Western Suburbs
- Ole Football Academy

== Personal life ==
Declan's nephew Jesse Edge is a former New Zealand youth international and is father of Harry Edge.
