= 2011–12 NZF Cup =

2011–12 White Ribbon Cup
- Founded: 2011
- Region: New Zealand (OFC)
- Number of teams: 6
- Current champions: Team Wellington
- Website: Official Website

The 2011–12 NZF Cup, also known as the 2011–12 White Ribbon Cup, was the inaugural tournament involving ASB Premiership clubs not involved in Champions League football. This was the first and only year it was held, mainly for the purpose of giving ASB Premiership clubs much needed football involvement during gap weeks that the OFC Champion League was being played.

== Participants ==
Auckland and Waitakere both topped the 2010-11 ASB Premiership, earning them a place in the 2011-12 OFC Champions League. The six remaining ASB Premiership teams were then entered into the White Ribbon Cup where they were split into two conferences relating to their geographic location with Waikato, Hawke's Bay and Manawatu forming the Northern Conference and Wellington, Canterbury and Otago forming the Southern Conference.

Northern Conference	Southern Conference
Waikato FC	Team Wellington
YoungHeart Manawatu	Canterbury United
Hawke's Bay United	Otago United

== Schedule ==
Round		Date
Group Stage	Matchday 1	3 December 2011
Group Stage	Matchday 2	19 February 2012
Group Stage	Matchday 3	3 March 2012
Final		1 April 2012

== Group stage ==
Within each conference, each team plays the other two teams once. The top team from each conference then play each other in the grand final to determine the winner of the White Ribbon cup.

=== Northern Conference ===
Team	Pld	W	D	L	GF	GA	GD	Pts
Waikato FC	2	2	0	0	5	1	+4	6
Hawke's Bay United	2	1	0	1	5	2	+3	3
YoungHeart Manawatu	2	0	0	2	1	8	−7	0

3 December 2011
14:00 UTC+13:00

Waikato FC	2–0	Hawke's Bay United
Tyler Lissette 17'; Jason Hicks 29'	Report

Crown Park, Taupō
Referee: Chris Kerr

4 March 2012
14:00 UTC+13:00

Hawke's Bay United	5–0	YoungHeart Manawatu
Stu Wilson 26', 37'; Danny Wilson 42'; Matt Hastings 78'; Stephen Hindmarch 84'

Bluewater Stadium, Napier
Referee: Jonathan Price

17 March 2012
14:00 UTC+13:00

YoungHeart Manawatu	1–3	Waikato FC
Seule Soromon 18'	Report	Ryan Thomas 19', 40'; Mohammed Awad 50'

Memorial Park, Manawatu
Referee: Nick Waldron

=== Southern Conference ===
Team	Pld	W	D	L	GF	GA	GD	Pts
Team Wellington	2	2	0	0	9	1	+8	6
Canterbury United	2	1	0	1	2	4	−2	3
Otago United	2	0	0	2	2	8	−6	0

3 December 2011
14:00 UTC+13:00

Team Wellington	3–0	Canterbury
Dakota Lucas 9', 20', 30'	Report

David Farrington Park, Wellington
Referee: Jamie Cross

19 February 2012
14:00 UTC+13:00

Canterbury	2–1	Otago United
Aaron Clapham 6' (pen.); Geoff MacIntyre 72'	Preview; Report	Ant Hancock 85'

ASB Football Park, Christchurch

4 March 2012
14:00 UTC+13:00

Otago United	1–6	Team Wellington
Tristan Prattley 53' (pen.)	Report	Louis Fenton 2', 35', 46'; Michael Eagar 3', 44' (pen.); Dakota Lucas 82' (pen.)

Tahuna Park, Dunedin

== Final ==
1 April 2012
13:00 UTC+12:00

Waikato FC	1–6	Team Wellington
Adam Thomas 55' (pen.)	Report	Ethan Galbraith 12', 57', 75'; Patrick Fleming 16'; Henry Fa'arodo 46'; Dakota Lucas 90+5'

Gower Park, Hamilton
Referee: Mark Hester

== Top goalscorers ==
Goals	Player	Team
5	(New Zealand) Dakota Lucas	Team Wellington
3	(New Zealand) Louis Fenton	Team Wellington
3	(New Zealand) Ethan Galbraith	Team Wellington
2	(New Zealand) Stu Wilson	Hawke's Bay United
2	(New Zealand) Michael Eagar	Team Wellington
2	(New Zealand) Ryan Thomas	Waikato FC
1	(New Zealand) Aaron Clapham	Canterbury United
1	(New Zealand) Geoff MacIntyre	Canterbury United
1	(England) Danny Wilson	Hawke's Bay United
1	(New Zealand) Matt Hastings	Hawke's Bay United
1	(England) Stephen Hindmarch	Hawke's Bay United
1	(New Zealand) Ant Hancock	Otago United
1	(New Zealand) Tristan Prattley	Otago United
1	(New Zealand) Patrick Fleming	Team Wellington
1	(New Zealand) Henry Fa'arodo	Team Wellington
1	(New Zealand) Tyler Lissette	Waikato FC
1	(New Zealand) Jason Hicks	Waikato FC
1	(New Zealand) (Somalia) Mohammed Awad	Waikato FC
1	(New Zealand) Adam Thomas	Waikato FC
1	(Vanuatu) Seule Soromon	YoungHeart Manawatu
