= Justin Gulley =

New Zealand footballer

- Gulley playing for Wellington Olympic in 2026.

Personal information
- Full name: Justin Gulley
- Date of birth: 15 January 1993 (age 33)
- Place of birth: Lower Hutt, New Zealand
- Height: 1.75 m (5 ft 9 in)
- Position: Defender

Team information
- Current team: Wellington Olympic
- Number: 5

Youth career
- –2011: Team Wellington

Senior career*
| Years | Team | Apps | (Gls) |
| 2011–2014 | Team Wellington | 36 | (3) |
| 2014–2016 | Wellington Phoenix Reserves | 15 | (0) |
| 2015–2016 | Wellington Phoenix | 8 | (0) |
| 2016–2019 | Team Wellington | 49 | (5) |
| 2019 | Wellington Phoenix | 1 | (0) |
| 2019 | Wellington Phoenix Reserves | 2 | (1) |
| 2019–2021 | Team Wellington | 24 | (0) |
| 2022- | Wellington Olympic | 69 | (2) |

International career^{‡}
| 2013 | New Zealand U-20 | 9 | (0) |
| 2018– | New Zealand | 3 | (0) |
- * Club domestic league appearances and goals as of 25 November 2024 ‡ National team caps and goals as of 29 January 2018

Justin Gulley (born 15 January 1993) is a New Zealand professional footballer who currently plays as a defender for Wellington Olympic.

== Club career ==
=== Wellington Phoenix ===
On 4 October 2015, Gulley signed a senior contract with Wellington Phoenix.

=== Wellington United ===
On 10 May 2016, Wellington Phoenix released Gulley from his contract so he could gain gametime at Wellington United.

=== Team Wellington ===
After missing out on a new contract with Wellington Phoenix, Gulley signed again with Team Wellington.

In September 2019, Gulley rejoin to Team Wellington.

== International career ==
=== U-20 ===
Gulley played every game for the New Zealand national under-20 football team at the 2013 OFC U-20 Championship which they won, meaning they qualified to play at the 2013 FIFA U-20 World Cup in Turkey.

Gulley made his World Cup debut in New Zealand in a 0–3 loss to Uzbekistan, coming on as a sub in the 69th minute. He got his first start in the next match again Uruguay before again coming off the bench in their last game against Croatia.

=== National team ===
On the 19 March 2018, Gulley was called up for the New Zealand national football team for their friendly against Canada after initially being placed on the standby list, after Storm Roux withdrew from the team for personal reasons.

== Honours ==
=== Club ===
- New Zealand Football Championship: Premiers 2011–12, 2016–17; Runner Up 2011–12, 2013–14, 2017–18
- OFC Champions League Runner Up: 2014–2015, 2017

=== International ===
- OFC U-20 Championship: 2013
