= Dave Radrigai =

Fijian footballer

Personal information
- Full name: Dave Radrigai
- Date of birth: 15 March 1990 (age 36)
- Place of birth: Labasa, Fiji
- Positions: Defender; midfielder

Team information
- Current team: Lautoka
- Number: 7

Youth career
- Lautoka

Senior career*
Years	Team	Apps	(Gls)
2009–2014	Lautoka		
2014–2016	Suva		
2016–	Lautoka		(8)

International career^{‡}
2015–	Fiji	31	(3)
- Fiji Futsal
Medal record
Men's football
Representing Fiji
Pacific Games
Bronze medal – third place	2019 Samoa
Pacific Mini Games
Silver medal – second place	2017 Vanuatu
- * Club domestic league appearances and goals as of 30 June 2019 ‡ National team caps and goals as of 8 September 2024

Dave Radrigai (born 15 March 1990) is a Fijian footballer who plays as a midfielder for Lautoka in the Fiji National Football League.

== Club career ==
Radrigai started his career with Lautoka. In 2014 he moved to Suva to play in the OFC Champions League with them. In 2016 he returned to Lautoka. In 2017 he won the 2017 Fiji National Football League with Lautoka, the first title in 8 years for the baby blues.

== International career ==
Radrigai made his debut for the Fiji national football team in a 5-0 victory against Tonga on 19 August 2015. He scored his first goal on 12 December 2017 in a 4-0 victory also against Tonga.

=== International goals ===
Scores and results list Fiji's goal tally first.

No	Date	Venue	Opponent	Score	Result	Competition
1.	12 December 2017	Port Vila Municipal Stadium, Port Vila, Vanuatu	Tonga	3–0	4–0	2017 Pacific Mini Games
2.	7 June 2019	Korman Stadium, Port Vila, Vanuatu	Tahiti	1–1	1–1	Friendly
3.	8 September 2024	Churchill Park, Lautoka, Fiji	Hong Kong	1–0	1–1	Friendly

== Honours ==
Fiji

- Pacific Games: Bronze Medalist, 2019
- Pacific Mini Games: Silver Medalist, 2017
