= Lapalapa Toni =

Samoan footballer (born 1994)

Personal information
- Full name: Lapalapa Sene Crichton Toni
- Date of birth: 7 April 1994 (age 32)
- Position: Forward

Team information
- Current team: Lupe o le Soaga
- Number: 4

Senior career*
Years	Team	Apps	(Gls)
2012–2016	Lupe o le Soaga		
2016	Vailima Kiwi		
2016–	Lupe o le Soaga		

International career^{‡}
2015–	Samoa	6	(0)
- * Club domestic league appearances and goals as of 7 April 2016 ‡ National team caps and goals as of 18 July 2019

Lapalapa Toni (born 7 April 1994) is a Samoan footballer who plays as a forward for Lupe o le Soaga and the Samoa national football team.

== Career ==
In 2017 Toni was the topscorer of the Samoan league. He was part of the Lupe o le Soaga squads for the 2014-15, 2017, and 2018 OFC Champions Leagues. In 2019 he played for the Havelock North Wanderers while living in New Zealand. In 2020 he returned to Lupe o le Soaga for the 2020 OFC Champions League.

He made his debut for the Samoa national football team on August 31, 2015 in a 3–2 victory against American Samoa. He was selected for the team for the 2016 OFC Nations Cup. In June 2019 he was named to the squad for the 2019 Pacific Games.
