= Ross Allen (footballer) =

Guernsey footballer

Ross Allen (born 2 March 1987) is a Guernsey footballer who plays as a striker for Guernsey FC.

== Career ==
=== Club career ===
In 2006, Allen joined the Florida Tech Panthers in the United States. In 2011, he signed for English tenth tier side Guernsey FC, helping them earn promotion to the English eighth tier within 2 seasons. He was the top scorer of the 2011–12 Combined Counties Football League Division One with 51 goals and the 2013–14 Isthmian League Division One South with 46 goals.

Before the second half of 2017–18, Allen signed for Team Wellington in the New Zealand top flight, helping them win the 2018 OFC Champions League, their first international trophy. In 2019, he returned to Guernsey club Guernsey FC.

=== International career ===
He represented Guernsey at the 2015 Island Games, helping them win it.
