= Mario Barcia =

Argentine association football player

Personal information
- Full name: Mario Alberto Barcia
- Date of birth: 5 November 1989 (age 37)
- Place of birth: Santiago del Estero, Argentina
- Height: 1.80 m (5 ft 11 in)
- Position: Midfielder

Team information
- Current team: South Melbourne FC

Youth career
- –2009: Newell's Old Boys

Senior career*
Years	Team	Apps	(Gls)
2009–2010	Central Córdoba	4	(0)
2011	Aurora	0	(0)
2012–2014	Club Sportivo Fernández	35	(0)
2014	Island Bay United		
2014–2015	Hawke's Bay United	18	(1)
2015–2019	Team Wellington	58	(4)
2019	Semen Padang	3	(0)
2019–2021	Team Wellington	12	(0)
2021–2022	Avondale FC	24	(0)
2022	Oakleigh Cannons	9	(1)
2023	Bentleigh Greens	23	(3)
2024–	South Melbourne	26	(1)
- * Club domestic league appearances and goals

Mario Alberto Barcia (born 5 November 1989) is an Argentine footballer who plays for National Premier Leagues Victoria club South Melbourne FC as a midfielder.

== Career ==
On 25 January 2019, Barcia signed for Liga 1 club Semen Padang. On 21 June 2019, Barcia made his professional debut as a substitute in a 2–1 loss against Badak Lampung.

On 10 October 2019, Barcia returned to Team Wellington.

In 2021, Barcia signed to plays for National Premier Leagues Victoria club Avondale FC.
