= David Farrington Park =

Football ground in Wellington, New Zealand

Coordinates: 41.302907°S 174.824631°E

- Centennial Park
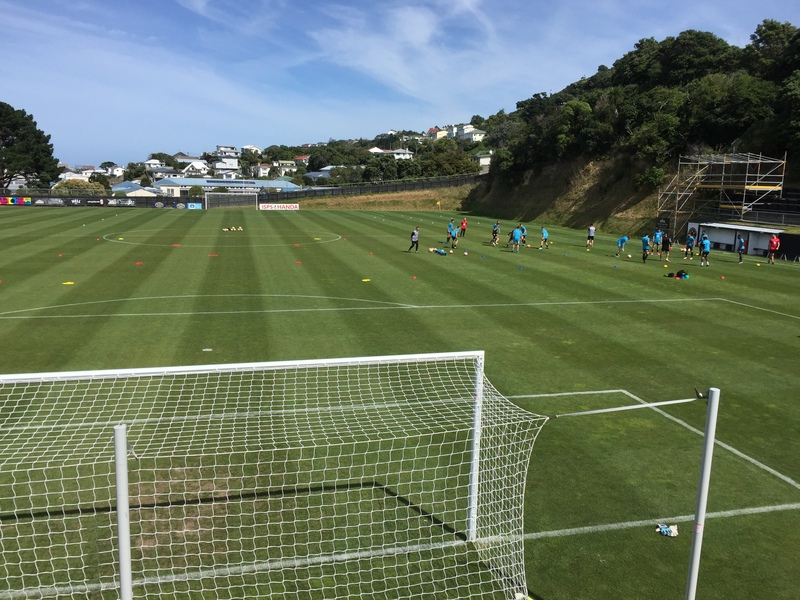

- Location of David Farrington Park in Wellington
- Location: Cnr Weka Street and Miramar North Road, Wellington, New Zealand
- Owner: Wellington City Council
- Operator: Wellington City Council
- Capacity: 2,250
- Surface: Grass Pitch

Tenants
- Team Wellington (–2021); Miramar Rangers AFC

David Farrington Park, previously known as Centennial Park, is a football ground in the suburb of Miramar in Wellington, New Zealand. It is used for football matches and is the home ground of Miramar Rangers.

In 2009, the ground's name was changed to David Farrington Park as a mark of respect to a local football stalwart (David Farrington) who died in 2008.

On 16 April 2017, David Farrington Park saw the first OFC Champions League game played in Wellington when Team Wellington beat Magenta 7–1, also qualifying Team Wellington for the home and away final against Auckland City for the 2017 OFC Champions League title and a chance to play at the 2017 FIFA Club World Cup in United Arab Emirates.

== History ==
The park was originally a motor camp during the Centennial Exhibition in 1940, which is how it got its original name, before it was used as temporary accommodation for New Zealand immigrants landing in Wellington.

The field was renovated in 2012 by Mexted Performance Sport Surfaces. The park had a build-up of organic matter and contaminants so the surface was holding water and was not draining away, affecting playability. Mexteds used a planer to take 100mm off the playing surface in two 50mm passes, then re-levelled the sub-grade and installed new primary drainage in between the existing drain lines, and introduced a new 50mm layer of clean turf sand.

New creeping rye grass was sown following the drainage work, which is intended to have more stability and hold the profile together better. Some of the sand from David Farrington Park was recycled at Houghton Bay Park to level off low spots. Houghton Bay is a former landfill site that experiences regular subsidence.

== Ground layout ==
The ground is typical of the type of stadium found in New Zealand. There is one uncovered grandstand on the west side of the ground which can accommodate around 600 spectators, and a small hill in the north-west corner. The rest of the terrace on the east side retreats a metre or so away from the playing surface. Overall the capacity for the ground is 2,000. At the south end is Miramar School, while the clubhouse resides at the north end.
