= Lautoka F.C. =

Fijian football club

Lautoka
- Full name: Lautoka Football Club
- Nicknames: Bluez and Labor Omina Vincit
- Founded: 1934; 92 years ago
- Ground: Churchill Park; Lautoka, Fiji
- Capacity: 18,000
- President: Shalendra Prasad
- Manager: Shivam Raj
- League: National Football League
- 2025: 3rd
- Website: https://lautokafootball.com/
Home colours	Away colours

Lautoka Football Association, also known as Lautoka FC, is a Fijian professional football club based in Lautoka that competes in the Fiji Premier League, the top flight of Fijian football. Their home stadium is Churchill Park. The club was formed in 1934.

== History ==
Lautoka Soccer Football Association was formed in 1934, under the leadership of John Bairagi. In 1961, Lautoka became affiliated with the Fiji Football Association.

Former crest of the club

Lautoka has the record of highest goals scored in the Inter-District Championship (IDC) finals. Lautoka thumped Ba in the finals one year by 6–0 and by 7–0 another year and also beat Suva in one of the finals by 7–1. That record remains unchanged.

Lautoka is also the first team to win the IDC 3 consecutive seasons. They have also qualified for the 2009–10 OFC Champions League by finishing on top of the Fiji National league table and also remaining undefeated.

== Achievements ==
- League Championship (for Districts): 7

1984, 1988, 2009, 2017, 2018, 2021, 2023.

- Inter-District Championship: 18

1941, 1942, 1949, 1950, 1953, 1957, 1958, 1959, 1962, 1964, 1965, 1973, 1984, 1985, 2005, 2008, 2017, 2018.

- Battle of the Giants: 3

1985, 2016, 2024..

- Fiji FA Cup Tournament: 4

2000, 2002, 2023, 2024

- Champion versus Champion Series: 3

2009, 2016, 2024

== Performance in OFC competitions ==
- OFC Champions League: 4 appearances

2010: 2nd in Group B
2011: 3rd in Group A
2018: Runners-up
2019: 3rd in Group B

== See also ==
- Fiji Football Association

== Bibliography ==
- M. Prasad, Sixty Years of Soccer in Fiji 1938–1998: The Official History of the Fiji Football Association, Fiji Football Association, Suva, 1998.
