= Team Wellington FC =

Team Wellington
- Full name: Team Wellington Football Club
- Nicknames: Team Welly; TeeDubs
- Founded: 2004; 22 years ago
- Dissolved: 2021; 5 years ago
- Ground: David Farrington Park, Miramar, Wellington, New Zealand
- Capacity: 2,250
- Chairman: Peter Chote
- Manager: Scott Hales
- League: New Zealand Football Championship
- Website: www.twfc.co.nz
Home colours	Away colours

Team Wellington Football Club was an association football club based in the suburb of Miramar in Wellington, New Zealand. They competed in the ISPS Handa Premiership. Team Wellington had traditionally been one of the most successful football clubs in New Zealand since their inception in 2004, having been crowned league champions twice and won the 2018 OFC Champions League. Their home games were played at David Farrington Park and Newtown Park.

== History ==
Team Wellington's original home colours

Chart of yearly ladder positions for Team Wellington in NZ 1st division soccer

Team Wellington FC was formed in 2004 by a consortium of Wellington clubs to compete in the New Zealand Football Championship. The uniform was yellow with black shorts, utilising the primary sporting colours of the Wellington region.

In the inaugural season (2004/2005) of the NZFC, Team Wellington FC performed below expectations, finishing sixth. They improved in the next season, ending the season in fourth place.

In 2007 the Australian A-League placed a franchise in Wellington, known as the Wellington Phoenix. The Phoenix quickly entered a strategic alliance with Team Wellington. The new head coach for Team Wellington, Stu Jacobs, was hired as an assistant coach for the Phoenix while retaining his NZFC role. Team Wellington also changed their kit to a predominantly black strip similar to that of the Phoenix, using yellow as a highlight colour.

Team Wellington FC started the 2007/08 season with a five-game winning streak, a record for the competition. This was ended by a 1–1 draw against Auckland City FC on 15 December. Team Wellington finished the season in third place, qualifying for the Preliminary Final against second-placed Auckland City. Team Wellington defeated Auckland City 4–3 in overtime. Team Wellington thus went on to the Grand Final, in which they were defeated by Waitakere United 2–0 at Trusts Stadium.

On 21 April 2015, Team Wellington reached the final of the 2014–15 OFC Champions League in their first appearance in the competition. They were beaten on penalties by the defending champions Auckland City in the final on 26 April, having drawn 1–1 after extra time.

Heading into the 2016–2017 season, José Figueira took on the role as coach at Team Wellington on 1 July 2016.

In March 2016, Team Wellington won their first ever ISPS Handa Premiership title. Having finished in 3rd in the regular season, they beat Hawke's Bay United in the semi-final, before beating Auckland City 4–2 in an enthralling finale at QBE Stadium in Albany, Auckland.

Team Wellington FC won back to back league titles in April 2017, dispatching Waitakere United on penalties after an enthralling 6–6 draw in the semi-final, before beating Auckland City 2–1 in the Grand Final at QBE Stadium.

Team Wellington FC proved their worth in the 2017-2018 OFC Champions League by winning their way to the very nail-biting semi-final against Auckland that, despite ending in a 2–2 draw, Team Wellington FC won due to aggregate score. The game was viewed as extremely controversial as the referee added 8 minutes of extra time to the end of the game. This 8 minutes turned into 12 extra minutes (total game time was 101 minutes) and caused much aggravation from both sides before the referee blew the final whistle. After this, Team Wellington faced Lautoka FC in two final legs; one at home at David Farrington Park on 13 May 2018, the other at Lautoka FC's home ground of Churchill Park in Fiji on 20 May 2018.

Team Wellington FC won the first leg in a staggering 6–0 victory. The second leg was also won by Team Wellington FC, with a score of 3–4 to Team Wellington FC. This gave Team Wellington FC the title of Oceanic Champions and earned them entry to the 2018 FIFA Club World Cup to be held in the UAE in December 2018.

On 12 December 2018, Team Wellington FC played their first and only match in the 2018 FIFA Club World Cup against Al Ain FC, who would later be runners-up, scoring 3 goals in the first half. However, their lead was short-lived, with Al Ain scoring 3 goals and sending the match into extra time and then penalties. Team Wellington would lose the penalties 4–3 and were knocked out.

Team Wellington would win the last ever game played in the ISPS Handa Premiership, when they beat long time rivals, Auckland City 2–1 in the 2020–2021 Grand Final.

== Managers ==
- (England) Mick Waitt (1 July 2006 – 30 June 2007)
- (New Zealand) Stu Jacobs (1 July 2007 – 30 June 2011)
- (New Zealand) Matt Calcott (1 July 2011 – 30 June 2016)
- (England) José Figueira (1 July 2016 – 6 June 2019)
- (England) Scott Hales (1 July 2019 – 14 March 2021)

== Stadium ==
Team Wellington played all their home games at David Farrington Park in Miramar. There is one uncovered grandstand on the west side of the ground which can accommodate around 600 spectators. At the south end is Miramar School, while the clubhouse resided at the north end.

Previously Team Wellington played all home matches at Newtown Park which has a capacity of 5,000. In 2008, a training pitch was developed next to the playing field, used by the local A-League franchise Wellington Phoenix.

== Honours ==
=== National ===
- New Zealand Football Championship
  - Champions (3): 2016, 2017, 2021
- White Ribbon Cup
  - Champions (1): 2011–12
- Charity Cup
  - Champions (2): 2014, 2017

=== International ===
- OFC Champions League
  - Champions (1): 2018
  - Runners-up (3): 2014–15, 2016, 2017

== Statistics and records ==
=== Year-by-year history ===
Wellington league history
Season	Teams	League ladder position	Finals qualification	Finals position
2004–05	8	6th	did not qualify	
2005–06	8	4th	Qualified for Playoffs	3rd
2006–07	8	5th	Did not qualify	
2007–08	8	3rd	Qualified for Playoffs	Runners-up
2008–09	8	4th	Qualified for Playoffs	4th
2009–10	8	3rd	Qualified for Playoffs	3rd
2010–11	8	3rd	Qualified for Playoffs	4th
2011–12	8	4th	Qualified for Playoffs	Runners-up
2012–13	8	5th	did not qualify	
2013–14	8	2nd	Qualified for Playoffs	Runners-up
2014–15	9	2nd	Qualified for Playoffs	3rd
2015–16	8	3rd	Qualified for Playoffs	1st
2016–17	10	2nd	Qualified for Playoffs	1st
2017–18	10	2nd	Qualified for Playoffs	Runners-up
2018–19	10	4th	Qualified for Playoffs	Runners-up
2019–20	10	2nd	No playoffs due to Covid-19	
2020–21	10	2nd	Qualified for Playoffs	1st

=== Season summaries ===
Season statistics
Season	Pos	W	D	L	GF	GA	GD	PTS
2004–05	6	5	8	8	35	40	-5	23
2005–06	4	8	4	9	43	53	−10	28
2006–07	5	7	6	8	37	34	+3	27
2007–08	3	15	2	4	51	21	+30	27
2008–09	4	7	2	5	28	28	0	23
2009–10	3	7	0	7	22	24	−2	21
2015–16	3	8	3	3	36	21	+15	27
2016–17	2	11	3	4	51	32	+19	36
2017–18	2	11	4	3	39	20	+19	37
2018–19	4	10	4	4	43	25	+18	34
2019–20	2 (Note: Season finished early due to Covid-19)	10	4	2	36	15	+21	34
2020–21	2	7	5	2	35	21	+14	26

=== Performance in OFC competitions ===
Season	Competition	Round	Club	Home	Away	Aggregate
2014–15	OFC Champions League	Group C	(Vanuatu) Tafea	3–2		1st
2014–15	OFC Champions League	Group C	(French Polynesia) Tefana	2–1		1st
2014–15	OFC Champions League	Group C	(Papua New Guinea) Hekari United	2–0		1st
2014–15	OFC Champions League	Semi-final	(Fiji) Ba	2–0		
2014–15	OFC Champions League	Final	(New Zealand) Auckland City	1–1 (3–4 p.)		
2016	OFC Champions League	Group B	(Papua New Guinea) Hekari United	4–0		1st
2016	OFC Champions League	Group B	(Fiji) Suva	2–0		1st
2016	OFC Champions League	Group B	(New Caledonia) Lössi	2–1		1st
2016	OFC Champions League	Semi-final	(New Caledonia) Magenta	2–0		
2016	OFC Champions League	Final	(New Zealand) Auckland City	0–3		
2017	OFC Champions League	Group B	(Fiji) Ba	8–0		1st
2017	OFC Champions League	Group B	(New Caledonia) Hienghène Sport	3–1		1st
2017	OFC Champions League	Group B	(Cook Islands) Puaikura	4–1		1st
2017	OFC Champions League	Semi-final	(New Caledonia) Magenta	7–1	2–2	9–3
2017	OFC Champions League	Final	(New Zealand) Auckland City	0–2	0–3	0–5
2018	OFC Champions League	Group D	(Solomon Islands) Marist	1–1		1st
2018	OFC Champions League	Group D	(New Caledonia) Magenta	5–1		1st
2018	OFC Champions League	Group D	(Samoa) Lupe o le Soaga	7–1		1st
2018	OFC Champions League	Quarter-final	(Papua New Guinea) Toti City	11–0		
2018	OFC Champions League	Semi-final	(New Zealand) Auckland City	0–0	2–2	2–2 (a)
2018	OFC Champions League	Final	(Fiji) Lautoka	6–0	4–3	10–3
2019	OFC Champions League	Group C	(Fiji) Ba	2–0		1st
2019	OFC Champions League	Group C	(Vanuatu) Erakor Golden Star	3–0		1st
2019	OFC Champions League	Group C	(Samoa) Kiwi	13–0		1st
2019	OFC Champions League	Quarter-final	(Solomon Islands) Henderson Eels	6–1		
2019	OFC Champions League	Semi-final	(New Caledonia) Hienghène Sport	0–2		
