= 2016–17 New Zealand Football Championship =

Stirling Sports Premiership
- Season: 2016–17
- Champions: Team Wellington
- Premiers: Auckland City
- Matches: 44
- Goals: 139 (3.16 per match)
- Top goalscorer: Aaron Clapham; Tom Jackson (8 goals)
- Biggest home win: Auckland City 4–0 Team Wellington (23 October 2016); Auckland City 4–0 Tasman United (29 October 2016); Hamilton Wanderers 4–0 Eastern Suburbs (6 November 2016); Eastern Suburbs 4–0 Southern United (20 November 2016); Wellington Phoenix 4–0 Hamilton Wanderers (10 December 2016)
- Biggest away win: Southern United 0–3 Hawke's Bay United (10 December 2016)
- Highest scoring: Team Wellington 6–6 Waitakere United (26 March 2017)
- All statistics correct as of 18 December 2016.

The 2016–17 New Zealand Football Championship season (currently known as the Stirling Sports Premiership for sponsorship reasons) was the thirteenth season of the NZFC since its establishment in 2004. Ten teams competed this season with the addition of Eastern Suburbs AFC and Tasman United, and with WaiBOP United replaced by Hamilton Wanderers.

The competition began on 16 October and ended on 2 April 2017.

== Clubs ==
Team	Location	Stadium	Capacity	Manager	Kit manufacturer	Shirt sponsor
Auckland City	Sandringham, Auckland	Kiwitea Street	3,250	(Spain) Ramon Tribulietx	Kappa	Hi-Chew (front) Trillian Trust Inc (Back) Carters (Back)
Canterbury United	Christchurch	ASB Football Park	9,000	(New Zealand) Willy Gerdsen	Nike	Robbie's Bar and Bistro
Eastern Suburbs	Panmure, Auckland	Bill McKinlay Park	5,000	(Scotland) Malcolm McPherson	Lilywhites	Winger Motors
Hamilton Wanderers	Hamilton	Porritt Stadium; Waikato Stadium	5,000; 25,800	(New Zealand) Mark Cossey	Nike	The Soccer Shop
Hawke's Bay United	Napier	Bluewater Stadium	5,000	(England) Brett Angell	Adidas	Kinetic Electrical
Southern United	Dunedin	Forsyth Barr Stadium; Peter Johnstone Park	30,500; 1,000	(Republic of Ireland) Paul O'Reilly	Lotto Sport Italia	Freshwater Solutions
Tasman United	Nelson	Trafalgar Park	18,000	(Croatia) Davor Tavich	Joma	Nelson Pine LVL (Front) Sprig & Fern (Back)
Team Wellington	Wellington	David Farrington Park	1,500	(England) Jose Figueira	Nike	Stonewood Homes
Waitakere United	Whenuapai, Auckland	The Trusts Arena; Fred Taylor Park	4,900; 2,500	(New Zealand) Chris Milicich	Lotto Sport Italia	Jerry Clayton BMW (Front) Heritage Hotels (Back)
Wellington Phoenix	Wellington	Newtown Park	5,000	(England) Andy Hedge	Adidas	Huawei

== Regular season ==
=== League table ===
Pos	Team	Pld	W	D	L	GF	GA	GD	Pts	Qualification
1	Auckland City	18	11	3	4	35	15	+20	36	Qualification to the Champions League and Finals series
2	Team Wellington (C)	18	11	3	4	51	32	+19	36	Qualification to the Champions League and Finals series
3	Waitakere United	18	10	4	4	31	25	+6	34	Qualification to the Finals series
4	Hawke's Bay United	18	10	2	6	46	30	+16	32	Qualification to the Finals series
5	Eastern Suburbs	18	9	3	6	28	25	+3	30	
6	Canterbury United	18	6	6	6	32	28	+4	24	
7	Wellington Phoenix Reserves	18	6	4	8	25	33	−8	22	
8	Tasman United	18	4	5	9	29	42	−13	17	
9	Hamilton Wanderers	18	4	1	13	24	50	−26	13	
10	Southern United	18	3	1	14	20	41	−21	10	

Updated to match(es) played on 19 March 2017. Source: NZ Football
(C) Champions

=== Positions by round ===
Team ╲ Round	1	2	3	4	5	6	7	8	9	10	11	12	13	14	15	16	17	18
Team Wellington	10	10	8	6	4	3	3	1	1	2	2	2	1	3	2	2	2	2
Auckland City	1	1	1	1	2	1	2	3	2	1	1	1	4	4	1	1	1	1
Eastern Suburbs	3	2	4	2	1	2	1	2	3	3	2	3	3	2	5	4	5	5
Hamilton Wanderers	4	7	3	7	8	7	5	7	4	8	8	8	8	8	8	9	9	9
Wellington Phoenix	8	6	6	8	6	5	6	4	5	6	7	7	7	7	7	7	7	7
Waitakere United	5	3	2	4	6	4	4	5	6	5	4	4	2	1	3	3	3	3
Canterbury United	6	4	5	3	3	6	7	6	7	4	5	6	6	5	5	5	6	6
Hawke's Bay United	2	5	7	5	5	8	8	8	8	7	6	5	5	6	4	6	5	4
Tasman United	6	8	9	9	9	9	9	9	9	10	10	10	10	10	8	8	8	8
Southern United	9	9	10	10	10	10	10	10	10	9	9	9	9	9	10	10	10	10

Leader and qualification to AFC Champions League Group stage
Qualification to Finals series

Source: NZ Football

=== Fixtures and results ===
==== Round 8 (rescheduled) ====
16 October 2016	Auckland City	0–1	Waitakere United	Auckland
15:00		Report	Nash 4'	Stadium: Kiwitea Street; Referee: Matthew Conger

==== Round 1 ====
22 October 2016	Wellington Phoenix	1–2	Eastern Suburbs	Wellington
14:00	Ebbinge 53'	Report	Burfoot 56'; Payne 58'	Stadium: David Farrington Park; Referee: Cory Mills

22 October 2016	Hamilton Wanderers	1–0	Southern United	Hamilton
14:00	Davis 9'	Report		Stadium: Porritt Stadium; Referee: Campbell-Kirk Waugh

23 October 2016	Canterbury United	2–2	Tasman United	Christchurch
14:00	de Jong 41'; Clapham 66' (pen.)	Report	Ridsdale 43'; Ifill 81' (pen.)	Stadium: ASB Football Park; Referee: Matthew Conger

23 October 2016	Auckland City	4–0	Team Wellington	Auckland
16:35	Tade 32'; Moreira 45', 76' (pen.); De Vries 58'	Report		Stadium: Kiwitea Street; Referee: Nick Waldron

24 October 2016	Hawke's Bay United	3–1	Waitakere United	Napier
16:30	Barbero 2', 28'; Matsumoto 22'	Report	Collett 90+5'	Stadium: Bluewater Stadium; Referee: John Rowbury

==== Round 2 ====
29 October 2016	Auckland City	4–0	Tasman United	Auckland
14:00	Tade 6'; De Vries 23'; White 59'; Moreira 72'	Report		Stadium: Kiwitea Street; Referee: Peter Linney

30 October 2016	Team Wellington	1–2	Wellington Phoenix	Wellington
14:00	Harris 19'	Report	M. Mata 76', 90+2'	Stadium: David Farrington Park; Referee: Matthew Conger

30 October 2016	Eastern Suburbs	1–0	Hawke's Bay United	Auckland
14:00	Tieku 15'	Report		Stadium: Bill McKinlay Park; Referee: Nick Waldron

30 October 2016	Hamilton Wanderers	0–2	Waitakere United	Hamilton
14:00		Report	Morgan 63'; Butler 90'	Stadium: Porritt Stadium; Referee: Hayden McCabe

30 October 2016	Southern United	1–3	Canterbury United	Dunedin
16:35	Molloy 90+4'	Report	Clapham 3' (pen.), 30', 90+6'	Stadium: Forsyth Barr Stadium; Referee: John Rowbury

==== Round 3 ====
5 November 2016	Wellington Phoenix	1–1	Tasman United	Wellington
16:15	M. Mata 66'	Report	Ridsdale 33'	Stadium: Westpac Stadium; Referee: Ben O'Connell

6 November 2016	Hawke's Bay United	2–4	Team Wellington	Napier
13:00	Halpin 70', 83'	Report	Harris 16'; Jackson 79' (pen.); Zambrano 88'; Howieson 89'	Stadium: Bluewater Stadium; Referee: Hayden McCabe

6 November 2016	Waitakere United	2–2	Southern United	Auckland
13:00	Butler 18'; Hilliar 87'	Report	Ledwith 30' (pen.); Parkinson 71' (o.g.)	Stadium: Fred Taylor Park; Referee: Peter Linney

6 November 2016	Hamilton Wanderers	4–0	Eastern Suburbs	Hamilton
14:00	Darkwa 14'; Gunemba 45'; Nkoy 53'; Salter 54'	Report		Stadium: Porritt Stadium; Referee: John Rowbury

6 November 2016	Auckland City	0–0	Canterbury United	Auckland
15:00		Report		Stadium: Kiwitea Street; Referee: Matthew Conger

==== Round 4 ====
13 November 2016	Eastern Suburbs	1–0	Waitakere United	Auckland
14:00	Pasagic 46'	Report		Stadium: William Green Domain; Referee: Avnit Maharaj

13 November 2016	Tasman United	1–3	Hawke's Bay United	Nelson
14:00	Hoyt 20'	Report	Halpin 12', 45'; Barbero 82'	Stadium: Trafalgar Park; Referee: Cory Mills

13 November 2016	Southern United	0–1	Auckland City	Invercargill
14:00		Report	Tavano 82'	Stadium: Rugby Park Stadium; Referee: Hayden McCabe

13 November 2016	Canterbury United	4–1	Wellington Phoenix	Christchurch
14:00	Schwarz 43'; Clapham 64' (pen.); Hoyle 72', 84'	Report	Cahill-Fleury 28'	Stadium: ASB Football Park; Referee: Peter Linney

13 November 2016	Team Wellington	5–2	Hamilton Wanderers	Wellington
16:35	Jackson 35' (pen.), 56'; Stevens 31', 65'; Gulley 69'	Report	Webster 15' (pen.); Jones 17'	Stadium: Newtown Park; Referee: John Rowbury

==== Round 5 ====
20 November 2016	Hawke's Bay United	1–1	Canterbury United	Napier
13:00	Halpin 76'	Report	Hoyle 90+3'	Stadium: Bluewater Stadium; Referee: Campbell-Kirk Waugh

20 November 2016	Hamilton Wanderers	2–3	Tasman United	Hamilton
13:00	Darkwa 12'; Evans 90'	Report	Marowa 16'; Hajdari 86'; Ridsdale 90+2'	Stadium: Porritt Stadium; Referee: Peter Linney

20 November 2016	Wellington Phoenix	1–0	Auckland City	Wellington
14:00	Rogerson 86'	Report		Stadium: David Farrington Park; Referee: John Rowbury

20 November 2016	Waitakere United	0–2	Team Wellington	Auckland
14:00		Report	Harris 63'; Zambrano 90+3'	Stadium: The Trusts Arena; Referee: Kader Zitouni

20 November 2016	Eastern Suburbs	4–0	Southern United	Auckland
16:35	Pasagic 15', 34'; Adams 52'; Kurimata 71'	Report		Stadium: Bill McKinlay Park; Referee: Antony Riley

==== Round 6 ====
25 November 2016	Southern United	0–1	Wellington Phoenix	Dunedin
17:00		Report	M. Mata 25'	Stadium: Forsyth Barr Stadium; Referee: Antony Riley

26 November 2016	Team Wellington	0–0	Eastern Suburbs	Wellington
14:00		Report		Stadium: David Farrington Park; Referee: Anna-Marie Keighley

26 November 2016	Auckland City	1–0	Hawke's Bay United	Auckland
16:35	Lea'alafa 2'	Report		Stadium: Kiwitea Street; Referee: Peter Linney

27 November 2016	Tasman United	1–3	Waitakere United	Nelson
14:00	Ridsdale 65'	Report	Butler 1', 11', 53'	Stadium: Trafalgar Park; Referee: Hayden McCabe

27 November 2016	Canterbury United	1–2	Hamilton Wanderers	Christchurch
14:00	Hoyle 34'	Report	Gunemba 19'; Webster 55'	Stadium: ASB Football Park; Referee: Cory Mills

==== Round 7 ====
4 December 2016	Hawke's Bay United	2–0	Wellington Phoenix	Napier
13:00	Kilkolly 16'; Barbero 81'	Report		Stadium: Bluewater Stadium; Referee: Antony Riley

4 December 2016	Team Wellington	4–1	Southern United	Wellington
14:00	Jackson 35', 72' (pen.), 90+2'; Zambrano 50'	Report	Mulligan 54'	Stadium: David Farrington Park; Referee: Peter Linney

4 December 2016	Waitakere United	1–0	Canterbury United	Auckland
14:00	Morgan 31'	Report		Stadium: Fred Taylor Park; Referee: Campbell-Kirk Waugh

4 December 2016	Eastern Suburbs	4–2	Tasman United	Auckland
16:35	Lovemore 5', 88'; Adams 59'; Dyer 90+2'	Report	Marowa 20'; Allan 83'	Stadium: Bill McKinlay Park; Referee: Hayden McCabe

==== Round 8 ====
10 December 2016	Southern United	0–3	Hawke's Bay United	Mosgiel
14:00		Report	Kilkolly 17'; Mason-Smith 31', 8900'	Stadium: Peter Johnstone Park; Referee: Chris Kerr

10 December 2016	Wellington Phoenix	4–0	Hamilton Wanderers	Hamilton
16:45	Cahill-Fleury 57', 72'; M. Mata 88'; Rufer 90+2' (pen.)	Report		Stadium: FMG Stadium; Referee: Anna-Marie Keighley

11 December 2016	Canterbury United	2–0	Eastern Suburbs	Christchurch
13:00	De Jong 50'; Clapham 52' (pen.)	Report		Stadium: ASB Football Park; Referee: John Rowbury

11 December 2016	Tasman United	1–2	Team Wellington	Nelson
14:00	Hadjari 65'	Report	Bevin 47'; Stevens 75'	Stadium: Trafalgar Park; Referee: Matthew Conger

==== Round 9 ====
18 December 2016	Southern United	3–1	Tasman United	Mosgiel
14:00	Furlong 48' (pen.); Mulligan 58', 72'	Report	Marowa 68'	Stadium: Peter Johnstone Park; Referee: Anna-Marie Keighley

17 December 2016	Waitakere United	2–2	Wellington Phoenix	Auckland
14:00	Morgan 16'; Thelen 83' (pen.)	Report	Singh 89', 90+4'	Stadium: The Trusts Arena; Referee: John Rowbury

18 December 2016	Team Wellington	3–3	Canterbury United	Wellington
14:00	Bevin 10'; Jackson 29', 83'	Report	Clapham 43', 52' (pen.); De Jong 57'	Stadium: David Farrington Park; Referee: Antony Riley

18 December 2016	Eastern Suburbs	0–1	Auckland City	Auckland
14:00		Report	Tade 71' (pen.)	Stadium: Bill McKinlay Park; Referee: Matthew Conger

18 December 2016	Hamilton Wanderers	6–4	Hawke's Bay United	Hamilton
16:35	Darkwa 18'; Webster 49' (pen.); Evans 55'; Gunemba 74'; Redwood 76'; Salter 90'	Report	Halpin 38'; Mason-Smith 65', 69'; Everson 90+3'	Stadium: FMG Stadium; Referee: Cory Mills

==== Round 10 ====
8 January 2017	Southern United	4–0	Hamilton Wanderers	Mosgiel
14:00	Molly 6' 46'; Furlong 33'; Cosgrave 86'	Report		Stadium: Peter Johnstone Park

8 January 2017	Team Wellington	1–3	Auckland City	Wellington
14:00	Harris 85'	Report	De Vries 12'; Tade 69', 86'	Stadium: David Farrington Park

8 January 2017	Eastern Suburbs	1–1	Wellington Phoenix	Auckland
14:00	Lovemore 75'	Report	58' (o.g.)	Stadium: Bill McKinlay Park

8 January 2017	Waitakere United	1–0	Hawke's Bay United	Auckland
14:00	Galbraith 62'	Report		Stadium: The Trusts Arena

8 January 2017	Tasman United	2–3	Canterbury United	Nelson
16:35	D. Burns 19'; T.Mrowa 63'	Report	A. De Jong 36' A. Clapham 38' S. Hoyle 90+3'	Stadium: Trafalgar Park; Referee: A. Keighley

==== Round 11 ====
14 January 2017	Wellington Phoenix	1–3	Team Wellington	Wellington
16:15				Stadium: Westpac Stadium

15 January 2017	Hawke's Bay United	6–3	Eastern Suburbs	Napier
14:00				Stadium: Bluewater Stadium

15 January 2017	Tasman United	1–1	Auckland City	Nelson
14:00				Stadium: Trafalgar Park

15 January 2017	Canterbury United	1–3	Southern United	Christchurch
14:00				Stadium: ASB Football Park

15 January 2017	Waitakere United	2–1	Hamilton Wanderers	Auckland
14:00				Stadium: The Trusts Arena

==== Round 12 ====
21 January 2017	Southern United	1–3	Waitakere United	TBD
13:00				Stadium: TBD

22 January 2017	Tasman United	1–1	Wellington Phoenix	Nelson
14:00				Stadium: Trafalgar Park

22 January 2017	Team Wellington	3–3	Hawke's Bay United	Wellington
14:00				Stadium: David Farrington Park

22 January 2017	Eastern Suburbs	3–1	Hamilton Wanderers	Auckland
14:00				Stadium: Bill McKinlay Park

22 January 2017	Canterbury United	2–2	Auckland City	Christchurch
16:35				Stadium: ASB Football Park

==== Round 13 ====
29 January 2017	Hawke's Bay United	3–2	Tasman United	Palmerston North
13:00				Stadium: Memorial Park

29 January 2017	Wellington Phoenix	1–4	Canterbury United	Wellington
14:00				Stadium: Newtown Park

29 January 2017	Hamilton Wanderers	2–4	Team Wellington	Hamilton
14:00				Stadium: FMG Stadium

29 January 2017	Waitakere United	1–1	Eastern Suburbs	Auckland
16:35				Stadium: The Trusts Arena

==== Round 14 ====
5 February 2017	Eastern Suburbs	3–1	Team Wellington	Auckland
14:00				Stadium: Bill McKinlay Park

5 February 2017	Waitakere United	2–2	Tasman United	Auckland
14:00				Stadium: The Trusts Arena

5 February 2017	Hamilton Wanderers	1–1	Canterbury United	Hamilton
14:00				Stadium: FMG Stadium

5 February 2017	Hawke's Bay United	2–1	Auckland City	Napier
16:35				Stadium: Bluewater Stadium

6 February 2017	Wellington Phoenix	3–0	Southern United	Wellington
14:00				Stadium: Newtown Park

==== Round 15 ====
12 February 2017	Tasman United	1–0	Hamilton Wanderers	Nelson
14:00				Stadium: Trafalgar Park

12 February 2017	Southern United	0–1	Eastern Suburbs	TBD
14:00				Stadium: TBD

12 February 2017	Team Wellington	7–2	Waitakere United	Wellington
14:00				Stadium: David Farrington Park

12 February 2017	Canterbury United	2–1	Hawke's Bay United	Christchurch
14:00				Stadium: ASB Football Park

12 February 2017	Auckland City	2–0	Wellington Phoenix	Auckland
16:35				Stadium: Kiwitea Street

==== Round 7 (rescheduled) ====
15 February 2017	Hamilton Wanderers	0–5	Auckland City	Hamilton
tbc				Stadium: Porritt Stadium

==== Round 16 ====
19 February 2017	Tasman United	2–1	Eastern Suburbs	Nelson
14:00				Stadium: Trafalgar Park

19 February 2017	Southern United	1–3	Team Wellington	Invercargill
14:00				Stadium: Rugby Park Stadium

19 February 2017	Wellington Phoenix	2–7	Hawke's Bay United	Wellington
14:00				Stadium: Newtown Park

19 February 2017	Canterbury United	1–2	Waitakere United	Christchurch
14:00				Stadium: ASB Football Park

19 February 2017	Auckland City	4–1	Hamilton Wanderers	Auckland
16:35				Stadium: Kiwitea Street

==== Round 13 (rescheduled) ====
22 February 2017	Auckland City	3–1	Southern United	Auckland
1pm	C. Howieson 17' C. Lewis 37' E. Tade 50'		B. O'Farrell 87'	Stadium: Kiwitea Street

==== Round 17 ====
4 March 2017	Hawke's Bay United	2–1	Southern United	Napier
14:00	S. Halpin15'; F. Barbero 63'		D.Furlong 8'	Stadium: Bluewater Stadium; Referee: C. Kerr

26 February 2017	Eastern Suburbs	2–1	Canterbury United	TBD
14:00				Stadium: TBD

26 February 2017	Waitakere United	4–1	Auckland City	Auckland
16:35				Stadium: The Trusts Arena

==== Round 18 (rescheduled) ====
4 March 2017	Wellington Phoenix	0–2	Waitakere United	Auckland
16:15			D. Morgan 54'; B. Mata own goal 57'	Stadium: QBE Stadium; Referee: A. Keighley

5 March 2017	Auckland City	2–1	Eastern Suburbs	Auckland
15:00	J.Moreira 67'-pen E. Tade 90'		M. Dyer 88'	Stadium: Kiwitea Street; Referee: P.Linney

==== Round 17 (rescheduled) ====
12 March 2017	Team Wellington	5–1	Tasman United	Wellington
14:00	B. Harris 26' T. Jackson 34', 42'-pen, 84' J.Gulley 90+3'		D. Burns 90+2'	Stadium: David Farrington Park; Referee: J. Rowbury

12 March 2017	Hamilton Wanderers	1–3	Wellington Phoenix	Tauranga
16:35	S. Dowling 68'		M. Ridenton 40' S. Singh 54' J.McGarry 86'	Stadium: Links Avenue; Referee: C. Kerr

==== Round 18 ====
19 March 2017	Tasman United	5–2	Southern United	Nelson
14:00	P. Ifill 14', 29'-pen, 48', 75'-pen T. Marowa 65'		D. Furlong 34', 69'	Stadium: Trafalgar Park; Referee: A. Riley

19 March 2017	Hawke's Bay United	4–0	Hamilton Wanderers	Napier
14:00	A. Luque Own Goal 40' A. Kilkolly 57'; C.Chettleburgh 62' F. Barbero 86'			Stadium: Bluewater Stadium; Referee: M. Stoneman

19 March 2017	Canterbury United	1–3	Team Wellington	Christchurch
16:35	A. Clapham 90+4'		J. Stevens 25' B. Harris 46' N. Hailemariam 90'	Stadium: ASB Football Park; Referee: C. Kerr

== Finals series ==
=== Bracket ===
Semi-finals
1	Auckland City	1
4	Hawke's Bay United	0
2	Team Wellington (p)	6 (3)
3	Waitakere United	6 (2)

Finals
1	Auckland City	1
2	Team Wellington	2

=== Semi-finals ===
25 March 2017
16:35

Auckland City	1–0	Hawke's Bay United
Lea'alafa 64'

Kiwitea Street
Attendance: 1,800

26 March 2017
16:35

Team Wellington	6–6 (a.e.t.)	Waitakere United
J. Gulley 45+1'; Zambrano 68'; T. Jackson 75' (pen.), 87' (pen.); J. Stevens 112', 114'		P. Reinhardt 36', 50', 120+1'; D. Morgan 67', 79'; D. Stansfield 91'
Penalties
Stevens (penalty scored); Bevin (penalty missed); Villa (penalty missed); Jackson (penalty scored); J. Gulley (penalty missed); Kirwan (penalty scored)	3–2	(penalty missed) Butler; (penalty missed) Stansfield; (penalty scored) Reinhardt; (penalty scored) Collett; (penalty missed) Thelen; (penalty missed) Hilliar

David Farrington Park
Referee: A. Riley

=== Grand final ===
2 April 2017
16:35

Auckland City	1–2	Team Wellington
Emiliano Tade 28'		Ben Harris 10', 51'

QBE Stadium
Referee: Campbell-Kirk Waugh

== Statistics ==
=== Top scorers ===
As of 1 April 2017

Rank	Player	Club	Goals
1	(New Zealand) Tom Jackson	Team Wellington	16
2	(New Zealand) Aaron Clapham	Canterbury United	12
2	(England) Saul Halpin	Hawke's Bay United	12
2	(Argentina) Emiliano Tade	Auckland City	12
5	(England) Ben Harris	Team Wellington	11
5	(England) Sam Mason-Smith	Hawke's Bay United	11
7	(Argentina) Facundo Barbero	Hawke's Bay United	9
8	(Barbados) Paul Ifill	Tasman United	8
9	(England) Stephen Hoyle	Canterbury United	7
9	(New Zealand) Tinashe Marowa	Tasman United	7
