= Pascal Reinhardt =

German footballer and coach

Personal information
- Date of birth: 11 September 1992 (age 34)
- Place of birth: Horb, Germany
- Position: Striker

Team information
- Current team: SG Sonnenhof Großaspach (manager)

Youth career
- –2010: SSV Reutlingen
- 2010–2011: Stuttgarter Kickers

Senior career*
Years	Team	Apps	(Gls)
2011–2012	Bayern Munich II	11	(0)
2013–2014	FC Homburg	39	(12)
2014–2015	Mainz 05 II	8	(2)
2016	SSV Ulm	34	(3)
2016	SSV Ulm II	1	(0)
2017	Waitakere United	9	(1)
2017–2020	VfL Nagold	33	(32)
2018	VfL Nagold II	1	(2)
Total		136	(52)

Managerial career
- 2019–2021: VfL Nagold (assistant)
- 2021–2023: FC Holzhausen
- 2023–: SG Sonnenhof Großaspach
- * Club domestic league appearances and goals

Pascal Reinhardt (born 11 September 1992) is a German former professional footballer who played as a striker. He is currently the manager of SG Sonnenhof Großaspach.

== Playing career ==
=== Youth ===
Reinhardt played as a youth for SSV Reutlingen and Stuttgarter Kickers. He scored 20 goals in the A Junior League for Stuttgarter in 2010–11.

=== Bayern Munich II ===
Despite interest from Stuttgarter in signing him to a professional contract, he decided to join Bayern Munich II in 2011. He made his debut for the team on the opening day of the 2011–12 season, as a substitute for Max Dombrowka in a 2–2 draw with 1. FC Nürnberg II, and would make a further ten appearances during the season as Bayern II finished in a disappointing 14th place in the Regionalliga Bayern. He suffered a couple of injuries in his first season — a pneumothorax injury that kept him out for four months, followed by a hernia. In 2012, he played for the first team in a friendly against SC Fürstenfeldbruck, where he scored two goals in a 7–0 victory. For the 2012–13 season, Mehmet Scholl became the new coach of Bayern II and Reinhardt's playing time diminished.

=== FC Homburg ===
Having been out of the Bayern II team during the first half of the 2012–13 season, he went on trial with SC Paderborn 07 before eventually joining FC 08 Homburg of the Regionalliga Südwest in 2013, where he scored his first senior goal on his debut, scoring the third in a 3–0 win over SC Idar-Oberstein, just a minute after coming on as a substitute for Dennis Gerlinger, which was his only goal of the season. Soon after, he injured his shoulder and was out for the next three months. The following year was a successful one for him - he finished as Homburg's top scorer with 11 goals, as they finished in 11th place in the league, while also winning the 2014 Saarland Cup.

=== Mainz 05 II ===
In July 2014, Reinhardt signed for FSV Mainz 05 II, who had just been promoted to the 3. Liga. He made his debut for the club on the opening day of the 2014–15 season, as a substitute for Marc Wachs in a 2–1 defeat at home to Arminia Bielefeld. After suffering an ankle injury that kept him out for a year, his contract was not extended.

=== SSV Ulm ===
In January 2016, after being out of contract since his injury at Mainz, he joined SSV Ulm 1846, where he played for two seasons. In his first season, they won the fifth-tier 2015–16 Oberliga Baden-Württemberg, gaining promotion to the fourth-tier Regionalliga for the following season.

=== Waitakere United ===
In the January transfer window of 2017, Reinhardt signed for Waitakere United of the New Zealand Football Championship, the top domestic division of football in New Zealand on a four-month contract. On 8 January 2017, he made his debut appearance as a substitute against Hawke's Bay United the day after he arrived in New Zealand from Germany and scored his first goal in a 2–1 victory over Hamilton Wanderers AFC, on 15 January. In the semi-final match of the league playoffs, Reinhardt scored a hat-trick, as well as a penalty kick in the shootout, in a 6–6 (3–2 PKs) loss to eventual champions Team Wellington.

=== VfL Nagold ===
Afterwards, he returned to Germany, joining VfL Nagold in 2017, in the Landesliga Württemberg, the seventh-tier of the German football league system. He had been in contact with various clubs from the 3rd division to the regional league, including FC Holzhausen, TSG Balingen and SSV Reutlingen and had trialed at FC Saarbrücken, before joining Nagold. Through the club, Reinhardt found a training position and founded his own football school in cooperation with the Nagold online sports shop “Sport-1a.de” which helped facilitate his move to the club. In a match against SV Wittendorf, Reinhardt scored the opening goal of the match just 9.23 seconds into the game. Nagold won the division in his debut season, earning promotion to the sixth-tier Verbandsliga Württemberg.

Following the season, he had an offer to join a club in the fifth-tier Oberliga, but he chose to remain with Nagold instead. He suffered an injury early in the 2018–19 season, tearing a cruciate ligament in his knee. After eight months, he returned against FC Wangen as a second half substitute, but reinjured the knee within five minutes, forcing him out for the entire next season.

Beginning in the 2019–20 season, following his injury, he became an assistant coach at VfL Nagold and also serves as part of their Mentoring Program for youth. He re-joined Nagold's playing roster for the 2020–21 season, while also continuing to serve as an assistant coach. Reinhardt would continue to wear the number 10 jersey, which had been given to new 2020 signing Nils Schuon, saying “Nobody gets the 10. Even if Messi comes, the 10 is mine.” On 22 September 2020, after re-tearing the cruciate ligament in his right knee for the third time, he was forced to end his comeback bid and retire and end his playing career, but he would remain with the club as an assistant coach. After announcing his retirement, he made a final symbolic appearance on 26 September 2020, coming on as a last minute substitute against SG Empfingen.

== Coaching career ==
Beginning in the 2019–20 season, following his injury, he became an assistant coach at VfL Nagold On 3 August 2019, he served as the head coach for a cup match against SV 03 Tübingen II, as head coach Armin Redzepagic was unavailable. For the 2020–21 season, he was expected to serve in a player-coach role. However, after another injury forced him to retire early in season, he remained with Nagold solely in his assistant coach role. He has his B Coaching license certification.

In 2021, he became the co-manager of Verbandsliga Württemberg side FC Holzhausen.

Ahead of the 2023-24 season, he joined SG Sonnenhof Großaspach as manager.

== Personal life ==
Reinhardt started his own soccer school in March 2020.

== Career statistics ==
As of 26 September 2020

Appearances and goals by club, season and competition
Club	Season	League				Playoffs		Domestic Cup (Note: Includes Württemberg Cup)		Total	
Club	Season	Tier	Division	Apps	Goals	Apps	Goals	Apps	Goals	Apps	Goals
Bayern Munich II	2011–12	4	Regionalliga Süd	11	0	—		—		11	0
Bayern Munich II	2012–13	4	Regionalliga Bayern	0	0	—		—		0	0
Bayern Munich II	Total			11	0	0	0	0	0	11	0
FC Homburg	2012–13	4	Regionalliga Südwest	11	1	—		?	?	11	1
FC Homburg	2013–14	4	Regionalliga Südwest	28	11	—		?	?	28	11
FC Homburg	Total			39	12	0	0	0	0	39	12
Mainz 05 II	2014–15	3	3. Liga	8	2	—		—		8	2
SSV Ulm	2015–16	5	Oberliga Baden-Württemberg	16	2	—		1	0	17	2
SSV Ulm	2016–17	4	Regionalliga Südwest	18	1	—		1	0	19	1
SSV Ulm	Total			34	3	0	0	2	0	36	3
SSV Ulm II	2016–17	8	Bezirksliga Donau/Iller	1	0	—		—		1	0
Waitakere United	2016–17	1	New Zealand Football Championship	9	1	1	3	—		10	4
VfL Nagold II	2017–18	8	Bezirksliga Württemberg	1	2	—		—		1	2
VfL Nagold	2017–18	7	Landesliga Württemberg	26	29	—		2	2	28	31
VfL Nagold	2018–19	6	Verbandsliga Württemberg	6	3	—		1	0	7	3
VfL Nagold	2019–20	7	Landesliga Württemberg	0	0	—		0	0	0	0
VfL Nagold	2020–21	7	Landesliga Württemberg	1	0	—		0	0	1	0
VfL Nagold	Total			33	32	0	0	3	2	36	34
Career total				136	52	1	3	5	2	142	58
