= Martin Petersen =

German football referee (born 1985)

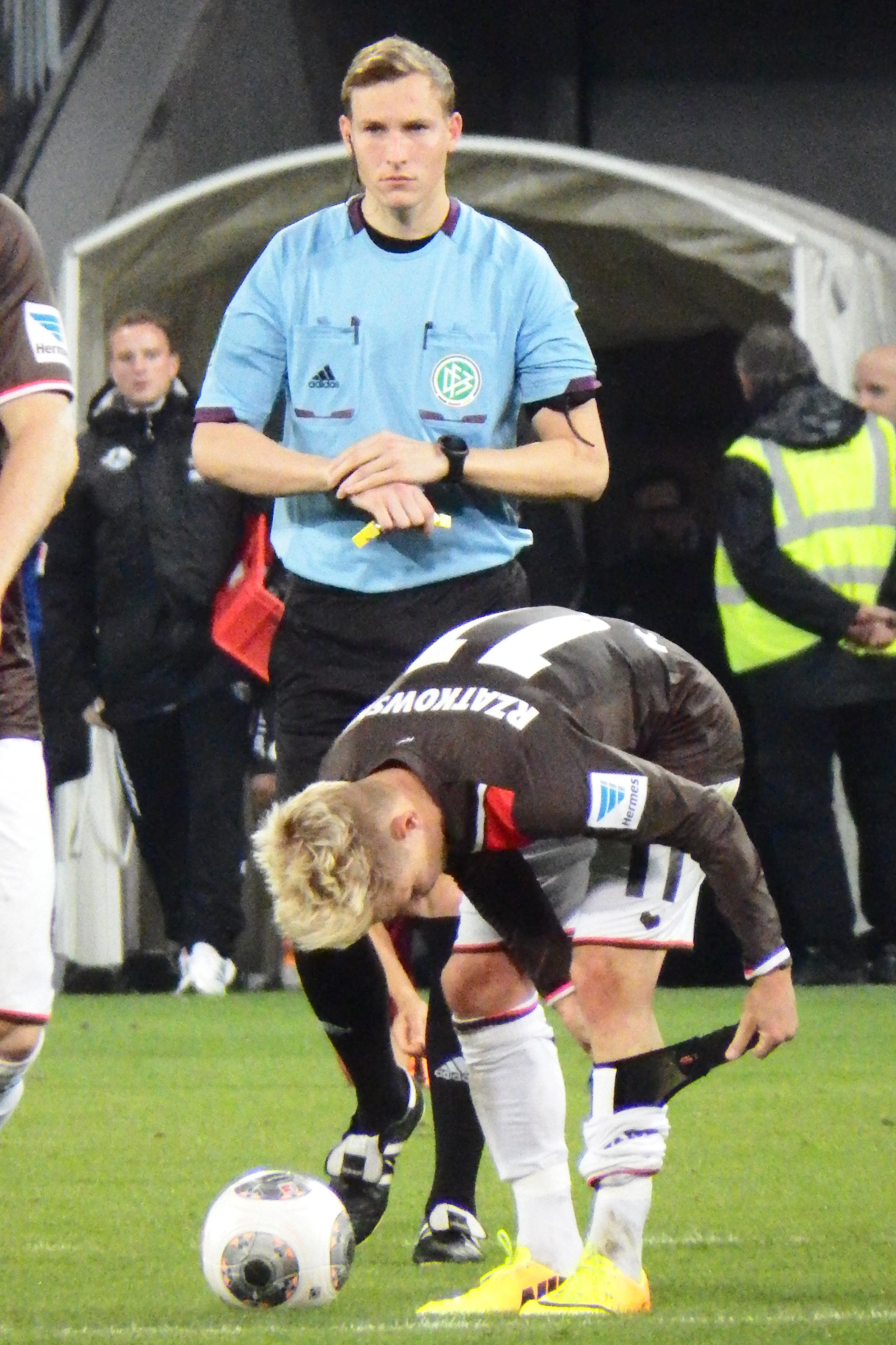
- Petersen in 2013
- Born: 28 February 1985 (age 41); Filderstadt, West Germany
- Other occupation: Real estate broker

Domestic
Years	League	Role
2009–	DFB	Referee
2011–	2. Bundesliga	Referee
2017–	Bundesliga	Referee

Martin Petersen (born 28 February 1985) is a German football referee who is based in Stuttgart. He referees for VfL Stuttgart of the Württemberg Football Association.

== Refereeing career ==
Petersen, referee of the club VfL Stuttgart, passed his refereeing test in 2000 and officiated in the Bezirksliga starting in 2001, where he also was active as an assistant referee. In 2002, he began to referee matches in the Landesliga Württemberg, becoming the youngest Landesliga referee of all time in Württemberg. From 2005 onwards, he took over officiating in the Verbandsliga Württemberg, before moving a year later to the Oberliga Baden-Württemberg. In 2008, he began officiating in the Regionalliga Süd, before he began officiating on the DFB level in 2009, starting in the 3. Liga. At the same time, Petersen was also active as an assistant in the 2. Bundesliga. In 2011, he began officiating in the 2. Bundesliga, and also became active as an assistant in Bundesliga.

On 10 August 2015, Petersen was hit in the head by a lighter in the 71st minute during the 2015–16 DFB-Pokal match between VfL Osnabrück and RB Leipzig. The match was stopped, with VfL Osnabrück leading 1–0, with the match abandoned shortly thereafter. On 11 August it was announced that Petersen suffered a slight concussion.

In 2017, Petersen was one of four referees promoted to officiate in the Bundesliga for the 2017–18 season.

== Personal life ==
Petersen lives in Stuttgart, where he works as a real estate broker.
