= Michael Deutsche =

German footballer

Personal information
- Date of birth: 1 April 1992 (age 34)
- Place of birth: Nagold, Germany
- Position: Right winger

Team information
- Current team: TV Echterdingen
- Number: 21

Youth career
- VfL Nagold
- –2009: VfB Stuttgart
- 2009–2010: Stuttgarter Kickers
- 2010–2011: SSV Ulm 1846

Senior career*
Years	Team	Apps	(Gls)
2011	SSV Ulm 1846	1	(0)
2011–2014	1. FC Heidenheim	16	(0)
2013–2014	→ 1. FC Heidenheim II	18	(2)
2014–2015	FC 08 Homburg	2	(0)
2014–2015	→ FC 08 Homburg II	5	(0)
2015–2017	SGV Freiberg	46	(16)
2018–2020	FSV 08 Bissingen	19	(1)
2020	→ FSV 08 Bissingen II	1	(2)
2020–2022	TSVgg Plattenhardt	38	(12)
2022–2024	TV Echterdingen	57	(10)
2024–2025	GSV Maichingen	26	(8)
2025–	TV Echterdingen	12	(0)
- * Club domestic league appearances and goals as of 23 May 2026

Michael Deutsche (born 1 April 1992) is a German footballer who plays as a right winger for TV Echterdingen in the seventh tier Landesliga Württemberg.

== Early life ==
Deutsche was born in Nagold, Germany and first began playing youth soccer with VfL Nagold. He then moved on to the youth teams of VfB Stuttgart, Stuttgarter Kickers, and SSV Ulm 1846.

== Career ==
In 2011, Deutsche made his first-team debut with SSV Ulm in the Regionalliga Süd, the fourth tier in German football.

Deutsche began his career with 1. FC Heidenheim, and made his 3. Liga debut for the club in August 2012, as a substitute for Michael Thurk in a 1–1 draw with Preußen Münster. He was released by the club at the end of the 2013–14 season.

In 2014, he joined FC 08 Homburg. In 2017, he joined FSV 08 Bissingen. In 2020, he joined TSVgg Plattenhardt in the seventh tier Landesliga Württemberg. He scored a goal in his debut against TV89 Zuffenhausen. For the 2020/21 season, he became a co-player-coach with Plattenhardt. In 2022, he joined TV Echterdingen, also in the seventh tier Landesliga Württemberg.
