= Alemão (footballer, born May 1990) =

Brazilian footballer

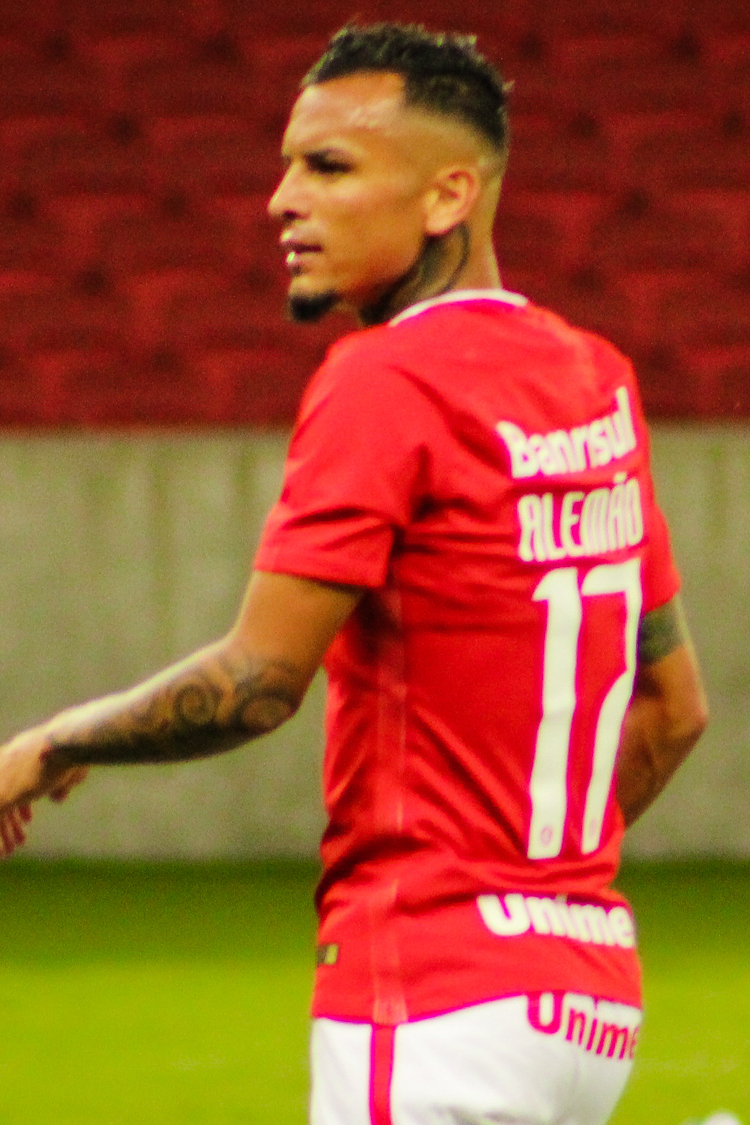

Personal information
- Full name: Jucimar José Teixeira
- Date of birth: 20 May 1990 (age 36)
- Place of birth: Oliveira dos Brejinhos, Brazil
- Height: 1.74 m (5 ft 8 1/2 in)
- Position: Right back

Team information
- Current team: Maringá FC

Youth career
- 2008–2009: Taboão da Serra

Senior career*
Years	Team	Apps	(Gls)
2009–2013	Taboão da Serra	29	(2)
2009–2010	→ VfL Nagold (loan)		
2012	→ Serrano-BA (loan)	9	(0)
2012	→ Nacional-SP (loan)	7	(1)
2013	→ Flamengo-SP (loan)	21	(3)
2014	União Barbarense	13	(0)
2015	Independente de Limeira	17	(3)
2015–2018	Bragantino	63	(3)
2016	→ Botafogo (loan)	10	(0)
2017–2018	→ Internacional (loan)	13	(0)
2018	→ Paraná (loan)	16	(1)
2018	Pohang Steelers	10	(0)
2019	Figueirense	16	(0)
2019	Londrina	11	(0)
2020	Água Santa	9	(0)
2021	Portuguesa	12	(0)
2021	Criciúma	14	(0)
2022	Vitória	26	(0)
2023–	ABC	23	(0)
- * Club domestic league appearances and goals as of 19 October 2023

Jucimar José Teixeira (born 20 May 1990), commonly known as Alemão, is a Brazilian footballer who plays as a right back for Maringá FC.

== Club career ==
Born in Oliveira dos Brejinhos, Bahia, Alemão made his debut as a senior with Taboão da Serra in 2009, and subsequently served loan stints at German club VfL Nagold, Serrano-BA, Nacional-SP and Flamengo-SP. In January 2014, he joined União Barbarense after his contract with CATS expired.

On 4 December 2014 Alemão moved to Independente, becoming an undisputed starter for the side in their first Campeonato Paulista Série A2 ever. In May 2015, he signed for Série B club Bragantino.

Alemão made his professional debut on 16 May 2015, starting in a 1–0 home win against Paysandu. He became a regular starter for the club during the campaign, appearing in 26 matches.

On 15 September 2016, Alemão was loaned to Série A club Botafogo until the end of the year, with a buyout clause. He made his debut in the category on 1 October, starting in a 2–0 home win against Corinthians.

On 28 December 2016, Alemão was bought outright by Bota for a fee of R$ 600,000 (for 60% of his federative rights) and signed a three-year contract with the club.

However, a couple of weeks later on January 20, 2017, the contract with Botafogo was withdrawn and he signed with Sport Club Internacional on a three-year contract. He joined For the 2019 season, he joined Figueirense. Late in 2020, he signed with Água Santa for the Copa Paulista.
