= Tinashe Marowa =

New Zealand footballer

Personal information
- Full name: Tinashe Marowa
- Date of birth: 23 January 1997 (age 29)
- Place of birth: Harare, Zimbabwe
- Height: 1.70 m (5 ft 7 in)
- Position: Striker

Youth career
- Auckland City
- 2014–2015: Wairarapa United

College career
| Years | Team | Apps | (Gls) |
| 2015–2016 | Milwaukee Panthers | 18 | (1) |

Senior career*
| Years | Team | Apps | (Gls) |
| 2016–2017 | Tasman United | 18 | (7) |
| 2017 | Wellington Phoenix | 0 | (0) |
| 2017–2018 | Tasman United | 10 | (0) |
| 2018 | Hawke's Bay United | 5 | (1) |
| 2018–2019 | Eastern Suburbs | 3 | (0) |
| 2020–2021 | North Shore United | 17 | (2) |
| 2022 | Bay Olympic | 4 | (1) |
| 2022–2023 | North Shore United | 9 | (0) |
| 2024– | Metro | 0 | (0) |
- * Club domestic league appearances and goals as of 12 October 2023 ‡ National team caps and goals as of 2 August 2017

Tinashe Marowa (born 23 January 1997) is a New Zealand professional footballer who currently plays as striker for Metro.

== Early life ==
Marowa was born in Harare, Zimbabwe, where his father was a car mechanic, and arrived in New Zealand aged eight. He learnt English only after arriving in Nelson, at Nelson Central School.

== Playing career ==
=== Club ===
Marowa joined Tasman United in October 2016 to play in the New Zealand Football Championship. He enjoyed a breakthrough season for Tasman United in the 2016–17 New Zealand Football Championship, the club's inaugural season.

Marowa joined Wellington Phoenix for a two-week trial in March 2017. Despite not resulting in a first-team contract, Marowa did move into the Phoenix's development program following the trial.

He made his professional debut for Wellington on 1 August 2017 in a round of 32 FFA Cup match against A-League side Western Sydney Wanderers.

After missing out on one of the professional contracts for the Wellington Phoenix, Marowa who instead of staying with Wellington to play for their reserves side, decided to return to Tasman United for the 2017–18 ISPS Handa Premiership.

=== International ===
Marowa was first called up to the New Zealand under-20 national team squad for a training camp in early 2017. He was a surprise omission from the squad for the 2017 FIFA U-20 World Cup after featuring in training squads in the lead-up to the tournament.

== Career statistics ==
| Club | Season | League | | | National Cup | | Continental | | Other | | Total | |
| Club | Season | Division | Apps | Goals | Apps | Goals | Apps | Goals | Apps | Goals | Apps | Goals |
