= VfL Nagold =

German multi-sport club

- Full name: Verein für Leibesübungen Nagold
- Founded: 1847 / 1934
- Stadium: Reinhold Fleckenstein Stadium
- Capacity: 1000
- Chairman: Holger Ehnes
- Manager: Armin Redzepagic
- League: Verbandsliga Württemberg
- 2022–23: 17th, Verbandsliga Württemberg (relegated)
- Website: www.vfl-nagold-fussball.de

VfL Nagold is a German multi-sport club, best known for its association football team in Nagold, Germany. It is the largest sports club in the Nagold region. Their football team currently plays in the Landesliga Württemberg, the seventh-tier in the German football league system.

The club's history dates back to 1847, and officially formed in 1934 when Turnverein (TV) Nagold, (re)founded in 1860 and the Sportverein (SV) Nagold, founded in 1911, merged to form VfL Nagold.

Nagold operates teams across 16 sports including badminton, basketball, football, handball, judo, karate, swimming, table tennis, and gymnastics. They currently have 1700 members.

== Association Football ==
Nagold's football program was founded in 1911 and is the largest sports department in the club. They currently have over 400 registered players, of which approximately 300 are in their youth program, which has been the club's main focus in football since the 1990s, when they made the decision to switch to a player development focus, bringing in Walter Baur to run the football program.

The first team currently plays in the sixth-tier Verbandsliga Württemberg, the top flight of the Württemberg state association.

The second team, VfL Nagold II, plays in the eighth-tier Bezirksliga Böblingen-Calw, as of 2019/20.

The youth teams range from the E1 (U10/11) to the A1 youth (U19). As of 2019/20, the U19 team plays in the Verbandsstaffel Nord (WFV); the U17 team plays in the Verbandsstaffel Nord (WFV); and the U15 team plays in the Landesstaffel 1 (WFV). The U-19 team has previously played as high as the Oberliga and in 2010 advanced to the U19 Cup final against VfB Stuttgart.

Their home stadium is the Reinhold-Fleckenstein Stadium, which was renovated in 2014 to include a high-quality turf field and a surrounding track in the club's blue color. It has a capacity of 1000 spectators, including the new covered grandstand which seats 200-250 people.

== Notable former players ==
- (Germany) Tim Kübel
- (Germany) Pascal Reinhardt
- (Brazil) Alemão
- (Germany) Eberhard Carl
- (Germany) Michael Deutsche

== Recent seasons ==
The recent season-by-season performance of the club:

Season	Tier	Division	Position
2008–09	VI	Verbandsliga Württemberg	4th
2009–10	VI	Verbandsliga Württemberg	10th
2010–11	VI	Verbandsliga Württemberg	15th ↓
2011–12	VII	Landesliga Württemberg Zone 3	2nd
2012–13	VII	Landesliga Württemberg Zone 3	2nd ↑
2013–14	VI	Verbandsliga Württemberg	12th
2014–15	VI	Verbandsliga Württemberg	10th
2015–16	VI	Verbandsliga Württemberg	15th ↓
2016–17	VII	Landesliga Württemberg Zone 3	5th
2017–18	VII	Landesliga Württemberg Zone 3	1st ↑
2018–19	VI	Verbandsliga Württemberg	12th ↓
2019–20	VII	Landesliga Württemberg Zone 3	2nd
2020–21	VII	Landesliga Württemberg Zone 3	2nd
2021–22	VII	Landesliga Württemberg Zone 3	1st ↑
2022–23	VI	Verbandsliga Württemberg	17th ↓
2023–24	VII	Landesliga Württemberg Zone 3	2nd
2024–25	VII	Landesliga Württemberg Zone 3	

↑ Promoted	↓ Relegated
