= Tim Kübel =

German footballer

Personal information
- Date of birth: 12 July 1993 (age 33)
- Place of birth: Böblingen, Germany
- Height: 1.75 m (5 ft 9 in)
- Position: Right-back

Youth career
- 1999–2006: SV Pfrondorf
- 2006–2008: VfL Nagold
- 2008–2009: TuS Ergenzingen
- 2010–2013: Borussia Dortmund

College career
Years	Team	Apps	(Gls)
2014–2017	Louisville Cardinals	82	(21)

Senior career*
Years	Team	Apps	(Gls)
2011–2013	Borussia Dortmund II	7	(0)
2013–2014	FC Schalke 04 II	15	(0)
2015–2016	VfL Nagold	5	(4)
2018	Toronto FC III	2	(0)
2018	Toronto FC II	22	(1)
2019	VfL Nagold	14	(1)
2024	VfL Nagold II	1	(3)
- * Club domestic league appearances and goals as of 21 April 2024

Tim Kübel (born 12 July 1993) is a former German professional footballer who played as a right-back.

== Early life ==
He first began playing with his hometown teams SV Pfrondorf and VfL Nagold. In 2008, he moved to the TuS Ergenzingen youth team, serving as team captain, where he was a part of their 2009 championship team. Bigger clubs became interested in him and he was invited to trial for the SC Freiburg and Hamburger SV youth teams.

On 1 January 2010, he moved to the Borussia Dortmund academy, where he played for four years and served as the captain of the U-19 team. He won the U19 and U23 championships with Dortmund in 2013. He originally played striker, but switched to right back after the Borussia Dortmund first-team coach, Jürgen Klopp, saw him play and was convinced he was better suited to being a right-sided defender.

== College career ==
After playing with FC Schalke 04 II, he moved to the United States to attend the University of Louisville where he played for the soccer team, after being offered an athletic scholarship. He led the team in scoring his freshman year with seven goals, en route to being named ACC Freshman of the Year and making the All-ACC second team. He was named to the All-ACC first team as a sophomore. He served as team captain for three years and won several honors for his performance. He had a program-record 26 assists in 82 games with Louisville, while also scoring 21 goals. Despite interest from several Major League Soccer teams during his tenure, he chose to play all four of his eligible years with Louisville, rather than to leave early to turn professional, declining two Generation Adidas offers in the process. Head coach Ken Lolla referred to Kübel as "one of most talented players, if not the most talented we've had."

== Club career ==
After spending four years with the Borussia Dortmund Youth Sector, he was only one of two players that made the Borussia Dortmund II reserve squad that competed in the 3. Liga.

In 2013, he decided to join FC Schalke 04 II, while also training regularly with the first team. After a disappointing season, he decided to head to the United States for college. During the NCAA offseason, in 2015, he played for his hometown team VfL Nagold, in the Verbandsliga Württemberg, the sixth tier of the German football league system, helping them avoid relegation, and returned again in 2016. The club was interested in having him return again in 2018, but he decided to pursue other opportunities.

Kübel was drafted 28th by Toronto FC in the 2018 MLS SuperDraft. He attended Toronto's training camp in 2018 attempting to earn an MLS contract. In March 2018, he signed with their second team, Toronto FC II of the second-tier United Soccer League. In a match against Penn FC, after goalkeeper Angelo Cavalluzzo was injured in the match, Kübel played goalkeeper for the last few minutes of the match. He scored his first professional goal against New York Red Bulls II in a 3–3 draw on 13 September. He played for a year with Toronto FC II, but his contract was not renewed, upon his request, as he wished to return to Germany to pursue coaching.

After his departure from Toronto, he returned to VfL Nagold, when he joined them for training and soon after signed to play for the main team as well as coach the youth team. Due to his commitments in the United States, he was forced to miss the final games of the season, which would determine whether Nagold remained in the sixth-tier or was relegated. Without Kübel, they lost the match, resulting in their relegation to the seventh-tier Landesliga. He retired after the season to pursue a coaching career full time in the United States while also completing his master's degree.

== Coaching career ==
While playing with Toronto FC II he also worked with the Toronto FC Juniors as a coach, in 2018.

In 2019, he returned to his boyhood club, VfL Nagold, where he coached the U19 side, while completing his UEFA B-License in coaching.

In the fall of 2019, he returned to the United States to complete his master's degree at the University of North Carolina and joined the men's soccer program as the Director of Student Athlete Development and Operations.

Since 2018, he has also worked as a Global Scout for Warubi Sports.

== Career statistics ==
As of 21 April 2024

Appearances and goals by club, season and competition
Club	League	Season	League		Playoffs		Domestic Cup (Note: Includes Württemberg Cup)		Total	
Club	League	Season	Apps	Goals	Apps	Goals	Apps	Goals	Apps	Goals
Borussia Dortmund II	Regionalliga West	2011–12	1	0	—		—		1	0
Borussia Dortmund II	3. Liga	2012–13	6	0	—		—		6	0
Borussia Dortmund II	Total		7	0	0	0	0	0	7	0
FC Schalke 04 II	Regionalliga West	2013–14	15	0	—		—		15	0
VfL Nagold	Verbandsliga WFV	2014–15	4	4	—		0	0	4	4
VfL Nagold	Verbandsliga WFV	2015–16	1	0	—		0	0	1	0
VfL Nagold	Total		5	4	0	0	0	0	5	4
Toronto FC III	League1 Ontario	2018	2	0	—		—		2	0
Toronto FC II	USL	2018	22	1	—		—		22	1
VfL Nagold	Verbandsliga WFV	2018–19	14	1	—		0	0	14	1
VfL Nagold II	Bezirksliga Böblingen-Calw	2023–24	1	3	—		—		1	3
Career Total			66	9	0	0	0	0	66	9
