= 2012–13 FC Bayern Munich season =

114th season in existence of Bayern Munich

Bayern Munich
2012–13 season
- President: Uli Hoeneß
- Head coach: Jupp Heynckes
- Stadium: Allianz Arena
- Bundesliga: 1st
- DFB-Pokal: Winners
- DFL-Supercup: Winners
- UEFA Champions League: Winners
- Top goalscorer: League: Mario Mandžukić (15); All: Thomas Müller (23)
- Average home league attendance: 70,250
Home colours	Away colours	Third colours

The 2012–13 FC Bayern Munich season was the 114th season in the club's history and the 48th consecutive season in the top flight of German football, the Bundesliga, since the promotion of the team from the Regionalliga Süd in 1965. Before the start of the season, Bayern signed Xherdan Shaqiri, Dante, Claudio Pizarro, Mitchell Weiser, Tom Starke and Mario Mandžukić. Bayern also added holding midfielder Javi Martínez after the first week of the Bundesliga season at the transfer deadline.

The club started the season with a nine-match winning streak. The club would end the season claiming the Treble, winning the Bundesliga, the UEFA Champions League and the DFB-Pokal. Bayern became the first German club to achieve the Treble, the third European Club to complete the Treble in five seasons and seventh ever in Europe.

== Review and events ==
=== Summer transfer window and pre-season ===
Xherdan Shaqiri, Claudio Pizarro, Tom Starke, Dante, Mario Mandžukić, Mitchell Weiser, Lukas Raeder, and Javi Martínez transferred to Bayern Munich in the summer transfer window. The transfer of Javi Martínez, at €40 million, was at the time the most expensive transfer in the history of the Bundesliga. Takashi Usami, Breno, Rouven Sattelmaier, Ivica Olić, and Danijel Pranjić left Bayern, Hans-Jörg Butt retired, and Nils Petersen was loaned to Werder Bremen. Hans-Jörg Butt was appointed head of the Bayern Munich Junior Team on 1 July; but Hans-Jörg Butt left the position on 7 August. Wolfgang Dremmler was appointed his successor on 9 August. On 2 July, the club announced that Matthias Sammer replaced Christian Nerlinger during UEFA Euro 2012. Jupp Heynckes believed that the 2012–13 squad is better than the previous season's squad.

Bayern began pre-season training on 3 July. Bayern Munich CEO Karl-Heinz Rummenigge stated that the Bundesliga championship is the top priority for the club this season. During pre-season, Bayern defeated SpVgg Unterhaching, FC Ismaning, Trentino XI, and 1. FC Kaiserslautern. Bayern lost to Napoli during pre-season. Bayern participated in cup matches during pre-season. Bayern won the Yingli Cup, Audi Football Summit, and the Paulaner Cup des Südens. Bayern finished in third place in the LIGA total! Cup.

=== August ===
Pre-season continued into August Bayern. August started with a pre-season victory against 1. FC Kaiserslautern. Then in the LIGA total! Cup, Bayern lost in the semi-finals to Werder Bremen in a shoot-out on 4 August and won the third place match against Hamburger SV on 5 August. Bayern first competitive match was the DFL-Supercup on 12 August against Borussia Dortmund. Bayern won 2–1 with goals from Mario Mandžukić and Thomas Müller. Robert Lewandowski scored for Borussia Dortmund. The DFL-Supercup was Bayern's first trophy of the season. Bayern went on to defeat SV Seligenporten 3–1 in a friendly match on 15 August. Bayern then played in the first round of the DFB-Pokal against Jahn Regensburg on 20 August. Bayern won 4–0. Bayern got two goals from Mandžukić, a goal from Xherdan Shaqiri and a goal from Claudio Pizarro. Bayern finished August with their opening match of the Bundesliga campaign on 25 August against Greuther Fürth. Bayern won 3–0. Bayern got goals from Thomas Müller and Mandžukić. Thomas Kleine scored an own goal to put Bayern up 3–0. Bayern finished the matchday in first place in the league table. On 29 August, Karl Hopfner, Deputy Chairman of the Executive Board for Bayern Munich AG, announced he will leave the club on 31 December 2012 for health reasons. Karl Hopfner applied for managing director of the club in October 1982 after seeing a job ad for the position in the Süddeutsche Zeitung. Hopfner had an interview in January 1983 and started as managing director in July 1983. The draw for the group stage of Champions League took place on 30 August. Bayern were drawn against Valencia, Lille, and BATE Borisov.

=== September ===
Bayern started the month with a match against VfB Stuttgart on 2 September. Bayern won 6–1 through two goals from Thomas Müller and one each from Toni Kroos, Luiz Gustavo, Mario Mandžukić and Bastian Schweinsteiger. Martin Harnik scored for Stuttgart. Bayern finished matchday 2 in first place. Bayern then faced Mainz 05 on 15 September, winning 3–1 through goals by Mandžukić, Schweinsteiger and Kroos. Ádám Szalai scored for Mainz. Bayern went on to face Valencia in Champions League on 19 September. Bayern won 2–1, where Schweinsteiger and Kroos scored for Bayern. Bayern faced Schalke 04 on 22 September. Bayern won 2–0 with goals from Kroos and Müller. Bayern faced VfL Wolfsburg on 25 September. Bayern won 3–0 with one goal from Schweinsteiger and two from Mandžukić. Bayern finished September with a league match against Werder Bremen on 29 September, where the club prevailed 2–0 via Luiz Gustavo and Mandžukić goals.

=== October ===
Bayern faced BATE Borisov on 2 October. The loss ended Bayern's nine-match winning streak.

Bayern faced 1899 Hoffenheim on 6 October.

Bayern faced Fortuna Düsseldorf on 20 October.

Bayern faced LOSC Lille on 23 October.

Bayern faced Bayer Leverkusen on 28 October.

Bayern faced 1. FC Kaiserslautern on 31 October.

=== November ===
Bayern faced Hamburger SV on 3 November.

Bayern faced LOSC Lille on 7 November.

Bayern faced Eintracht Frankfurt on 10 November.

Bayern faced 1. FC Nürnberg on 17 November.

Bayern faced Valencia 20 November.

Bayern faced Hannover 96 on 24 November.

Bayern faced SC Freiburg on 28 November.

=== December ===
Bayern faced Borussia Dortmund on 1 December.

Bayern faced BATE Borisov on 5 December.

Bayern faced FC Augsburg on 8 December.

Bayern faced Borussia Mönchengladbach on 14 December.

Bayern faced FC Augsburg on 18 December.

The draw for the Champions League Round of 16 took place on 20 December. The result was that Bayern would face Arsenal.

=== January ===
Bayern started January with mid-winter training on 3 January. Bayern had training in Qatar. Bayern defeated Lekhwiya SC, Schalke 04, FC Basel, and SpVgg Unterhaching during the mid-winter break. On 16 January, Pep Guardiola was announced as the new head coach for Bayern Munich. Guardiola is set to over for the incumbent Jupp Heynckes on 26 June, the start of pre-season training for the 2013–14 season. Bayern started the second half of the Bundesliga campaign on 19 January against Greuther Fürth. Bayern won 2–0 with two goals from Mario Mandžukić. The next day, Bayern defeated Alemannia Aachen in a friendly match. Bayern finished off January with a league match against VfB Stuttgart on 27 January. Bayern won 2–0 with goals from Mario Mandžukić and Thomas Müller.

=== February ===
Bayern started February with a league match against Mainz 05 on 2 February. Bayern won 3–0 through one goal from Mandžukić and two from Müller. Thomas Müller scored two goals. Bayern went on to face Schalke 04 on 9 February. Bayern won 4–0 with goals from David Alaba, Bastian Schweinsteiger and Mario Gómez. David Alaba scored two goals. Then Bayern faced VfL Wolfsburg. Bayern won 2–0. Mandžukić and Arjen Robben got the goals for Bayern. Bayern then had the first leg in the Round of 16 of Champions League on 19 February against Arsenal. Bayern won 3–1. Bayern's goalscorers were Toni Kroos, Müller and Mandžukić. Arsenal's goalscorer was Lukas Podolski. Bayern were back in league action against Werder Bremen on 23 February. Bayern won 6–1. Bayern got goals from Robben, Javi Martínez, Mario Gómez and Franck Ribéry. Mario Gómez scored two goals. Theodor Gebre Selassie scored an own goal that put Bayern up 3–0. Kevin De Bruyne scored for Werder Bremen. Bayern finished February with a quarter-final match in the DFB-Pokal on 27 February against Borussia Dortmund. Bayern won 1–0 with a goal from Robben.

=== March ===
Bayern started March with a league match against 1899 Hoffenheim on 3 March. Bayern won 1–0 with a goal from Mario Gómez. Bayern set a new league record with 583 consecutive minutes without conceding a goal. Bayern Munich faced Fortuna Düsseldorf on 9 March, winning 3–2 through Thomas Müller, Franck Ribéry and Jérôme Boateng goals. Mathis Bolly and Andreas Lambertz scored for Fortuna Düsseldorf. Bayern had the second leg of the Round of 16 in Champions League on 13 March against Arsenal. Arsenal won 2–0 with goals from Olivier Giroud and Laurent Koscielny. Bayern, however, advanced on the away goals rule. The quarter-final draw for Champions League took place on 15 March. Bayern were drawn against Juventus. Bayern faced Bayer Leverkusen on 16 March, winning 2–1. Mario Gómez scored for Bayern, Simon Rolfes equalized for Bayer Leverkusen, then Philipp Wollscheid scored an own goal to win the match for Bayern. Bayern finished March with a league match against Hamburger SV on 30 March. Bayern won 9–2. Xherdan Shaqiri, Bastian Schweinsteiger, Claudio Pizzaro, Arjen Robben and Franck Ribéry scored for Bayern. Claudio Pizzaro scored four goals and Arjen Robben scored two goals. Jeffrey Bruma and Heiko Westermann scored for Hamburg.

=== April ===
Bayern started April against Juventus in the first leg of the Champions League quarter-finals on 4 April. Bayern won 2–0 with goals from David Alaba and Thomas Müller. David Alaba's goal inside the first minute of the match. Toni Kroos tore his abductor muscle and was replaced by Arjen Robben in the 16th minute. Bayern went on to face Eintracht Frankfurt on matchday 28 on 6 April. Bayern won the match 1–0. The win meant Bayern won the Bundesliga in record time. Luiz Gustavo picked up his fifth yellow card and is suspended for matchday 29 against 1. FC Nürnberg. The return leg against Juventus was played on 10 April. Bayern again defeated Juventus 2–0; Mario Mandžukić and Claudio Pizzaro scored the goals. With Bayern's victory, the 2012–13 Champions League season is the first time that two German clubs are in the semi-finals. Mandžukić controversially picked up a yellow card early in the match and is suspended for the first leg of the semi-finals. The draw for the semi-finals of the Champions League was held on 12 April. Bayern were drawn against Barcelona. Bayern faced 1. FC Nürnberg on 13 April. Emre Can started for Bayern, making his Bundesliga debut. Xherdan Shaqiri was replaced by Pierre-Emile Højbjerg in the 71st minute. Højbjerg made his Bundesliga debut. At the age of 17 years and 251 days, Højbjerg became the youngest Bundesliga player in Bayern's history, breaking David Alaba's record of 17 years and 255 days. Bayern won 4–0 with goals from Jérôme Boateng, Mario Gómez, Rafinha and Xherdan Shaqiri. Bayern faced VfL Wolfsburg on 16 April in the DFB-Pokal. Bayern won 6–1. Bayern got goals from Mandžukić, Robben, Shaqiri and Gómez. Mario Gómez scored three goals within nine-minute of coming on. Diego scored for Wolfsburg. Bayern faced Hannover 96 on 20 April. Bayern won 6–1. Bayern got goals from Ribéry, Gómez and Pizzaro; Gómez and Pizzaro scored two goals each. With the victory, Bayern equaled Borussia Dortmund's record of 81 points in a season and broke the record for most wins in a season with 26. On 23 April, Bayern announced the signing of Dortmund's star player Mario Götze. Bayern activated the €37 million release clause that Götze and Borussia Dortmund agreed to. Bayern faced Barcelona in the first leg of the Champions League semi-final on 23 April. Bayern won 4–0 with goals from Müller, Gómez and Robben. Müller scored two goals. The media criticized Hungarian referee Viktor Kassai for not calling a penalty shot against Gerard Piqué in the 15th minute, Alexis Sánchez in the 32nd minute, and allowing Mario Gómez's goal to stand when he was in an offside position. Bayern finished April with a match against SC Freiburg on 27 April. Bayern won 1–0 with a goal from Xherdan Shaqiri. With the win, Bayern had 84 points in the Bundesliga, a new record.

=== May/June ===
Bayern started May with the second leg against Barcelona on 1 May. Barcelona players Sergio Busquets, Javier Mascherano, Carles Puyol and Eric Abidal were all out due to injury. Mario Mandžukić returned from suspension and replaced Mario Gómez, while Daniel Van Buyten replaced Dante, who was suffering from a cold. Lionel Messi did not play in the match. Bayern won 3–0, with goals from Arjen Robben and Thomas Müller, and an own goal from Gerard Piqué. Philipp Lahm, Bastian Schweinsteiger, Javi Martínez, Luiz Gustavo, Dante and Mario Gómez were all one yellow card away from being suspended for the 2013 UEFA Champions League Final. However, none of them received a yellow card and are all available for selection in the final. Bayern went on to face Borussia Dortmund on 4 May in the Bundesliga. The match ended in a 1–1 draw. Kevin Großkreutz scored for Dortmund, while Mario Gómez scored for Bayern. Rafinha was sent off after receiving a second yellow card. Rafinha was eventually suspended for the remaining two Bundesliga matches. On 6 May, the FC Bayern München AG supervisory board had a regularly scheduled meeting where Uli Hoeneß, president of Bayern München e.V. and chairman of FC Bayern München AG, offered to step down on a temporary basis. The supervisory board decided to reject Uli Hoeneß's offer. Bayern Munich announced that executive board members Karl-Heinz Rummenigge and Andreas Jung have signed contract extensions. Rummenigge was given a three-year extension which is scheduled to expire on 30 December 2016 and Jung contract was extended by two years to 30 June 2016. In addition, Bayern also announced that Jörg Wacker will join the executive board on 1 July 2013. Bayern faced FC Augsburg on 11 May. Bayern won 3–0 with goals from Müller Shaqiri and Luiz Gustavo. Bayern finished their Bundesliga campaign against Borussia Mönchengladbach on 18 May. Bayern won 4–3. Martínez, Ribéry, and Robben scored for Bayern. Franck Ribéry scored two goals. Martin Stranzl, Mike Hanke and Håvard Nordtveit scored for Borussia Mönchengladbach. Bayern faced Borussia Dortmund in the Champions League final on 25 May. Bayern won 2–1. Mandžukić and Robben scored for Bayern, and İlkay Gündoğan scored for Dortmund. After the match, Bayern had a party at the Great Room in the Grosvenor House Hotel. The party included a buffet for 1,800 people. Brand Finance valued Bayern at $860 million (£570 million), overtaking Manchester United for top spot. Bayern faced VfB Stuttgart in the DFB-Pokal Final on 1 June. Bayern won 3–2. Thomas Müller and Mario Gómez scored for Bayern. Mario Gómez scored two goals. Martin Harnik scored twice for Stuttgart.

=== Bayern–Brazil dispute ===
The Brazilian Football Confederation (CBF) insisted that Dante and Luiz Gustavo report to the Brazil national team's training camp for 1 June at 16:00 local time. The training camp was for preparations for the 2013 FIFA Confederations Cup. Bayern, however, were due to play VfB Stuttgart in the 2013 DFB-Pokal Final on 1 June. The CBF threatened to exclude both players if they did not report by the stated time. Under FIFA rules, clubs must let players report to national teams 14 days prior to the start of a tournament. Bayern sent a "polite" letter asking for their release for the final, however the CBF responded with a "polite" letter rejecting it. Bayern attempted to reach an "amicable solution". with the Brazilian Football Confederation but failed. Bayern CEO Karl-Heinz Rummenigge blamed FIFA, the CBF and the German Football Association (DFB). The German Football Association blamed the Brazilian Football Confederation. Brazil head coach Luiz Felipe Scolari claimed that Bayern were at fault since the CBF claimed that they sent letters 5, 10 and 15 days before the release date and also stated how they "would have been willing to negotiate" with the 15-day notice. Notably, the Royal Spanish Football Federation did not enforce the rule for Javi Martínez and made the player available for the DFB-Pokal final.

=== Broken records ===
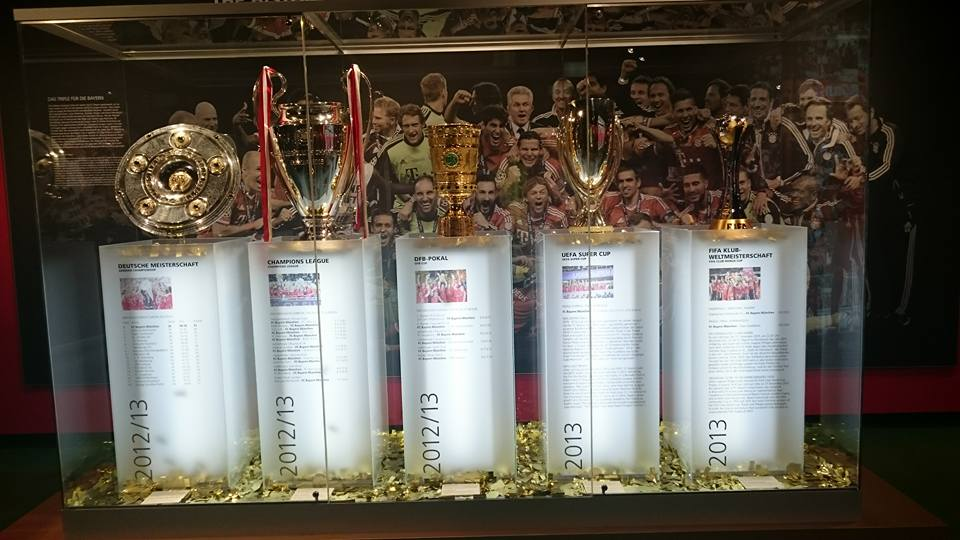
The five trophies won by Bayern Munich in this season: UEFA Champions League, Bundesliga championship, DFB-Pokal, European Super Cup, and FIFA Club World Cup.

Bayern broke or equaled 30 records during the season.

Records broken or equaled during the 2012–13 season
Broken record	New record	Previous record	Previous record holders	Season/Time period
Most points during a season	91	81	Borussia Dortmund	2011–12
Biggest lead over second place team	25	16	Bayern Munich	2002–03
Fastest time to clinch Bundesliga title	28 Matchdays	30 Matchdays	Bayern Munich	1972–73
Fastest time to clinch Bundesliga title	28 Matchdays	30 Matchdays	Bayern Munich	2002–03
Earliest date to clinch Bundesliga title	6 April	18 April	1. FC Köln	1963–64
Top of the table	34 Matchdays	34 Matchdays	Bayern Munich	1968–69
Top of the table	34 Matchdays	34 Matchdays	Bayern Munich	1972–73
Top of the table	34 Matchdays	34 Matchdays	Bayern Munich	1984–85
Top of the table	34 Matchdays	34 Matchdays	Bayern Munich	2007–08
Most wins in a season	29	25	Bayern Munich	1972–73
Most wins in a season	29	25	Borussia Dortmund	2011–12
Longest winning streak within a season	14	10	Borussia Mönchengladbach	1986–87
Longest winning streak within a season	14	10	VfL Wolfsburg	2008–09
Fewest losses	1	1	Bayern Munich	1986–87
Fewest goals against	18	21	Bayern Munich	2007–08
Most clean sheets in a season	21	19	Werder Bremen	1987–88
Most clean sheets in a season	21	19	Bayern Munich	2001–02
At least one goal scored in every match	—	—	1. FC Köln	1963–64
Consecutive matches with at least one goal	34	34	Bayern Munich	Between 1973 and 1974
Goal difference	+80	+64	Bayern Munich	1972–73
Away wins	15	11	Werder Bremen	2003–04
Away wins	15	11	Borussia Dortmund	2011–12
Away losses	0	0	Bayern Munich	1986–87
Away points	47	37	Werder Bremen	2003–04
Away points	47	37	Borussia Dortmund	2011–12
Winning streak away from home	9	8	Borussia Dortmund	2010–11
Away goals conceded	7	10	Werder Bremen	1987–88
Earliest Autumn Champions	14 Matchdays	15 Matchdays	Eintracht Frankfurt	1993–94
Earliest Autumn Champions	14 Matchdays	15 Matchdays	1. FC Kaiserslautern	1997–98
Earliest Autumn Champions	14 Matchdays	15 Matchdays	Borussia Dortmund	2010–11
Goal difference at the halfway point	+37	+33	Bayern Munich	2011–12
Goals against at the halfway point	7	7	VfB Stuttgart	2003–04
Away goals conceded at the halfway point	1	2	VfB Stuttgart	2003–04
First five away matches without conceding a goal.
Best start to a season	8 wins	7 wins	Bayern Munich	1995–96
Best start to a season	8 wins	7 wins	1. FC Kaiserslautern	2001–02
Best start to a season	8 wins	7 wins	Mainz 05	2010–11
Best second half of season	49 points	47 points	Borussia Dortmund	2011–12
Best start to second half of season	14 wins	7 wins	Borussia Dortmund	2011–12

== Match results ==
=== Friendly matches ===
==== Friendly matches ====
Date	Time^{1}	Stadium	City	Opponent	Result^{2}	Attendance	Goalscorers and carded players		Source
Date	Time^{1}	Stadium	City	Opponent	Result^{2}	Attendance	Bayern Munich	Opponent	Source
Pre-season friendlies
10 July	19:30	Generali Sportpark	Unterhaching, Germany	SpVgg Unterhaching	1–0	7,500	Alaba 82'; Shaqiri (yellow card) 73'; Dante (yellow card) 77'	—	
13 July	18:00	Stadion an der Lindenstraße	Ismaning, Germany	FC Ismaning	4–0	2,000	Markoutz 9'; Friesenbichler 71'; Shaqiri 86'; Schmitz 90'	—	
17 July	18:00	Stadion von Arco	Arco, Italy	Trentino XI	11–0	2,750	Markoutz 6', 11'; Robben 10', 34', 43'; Mandžukić 20'; Alaba 52'; Friesenbichler 54', 64', 66'; Pizarro 79'	—	
20 July	18:30	Stadion von Arco	Arco, Italy	Napoli	2–3	3,083	Alaba 16'; Shaqiri 73'	Cannavaro 45'; Pandev 67'; Insigne 82'; Džemaili (yellow card) 78'	
1 August	18:30	Fritz-Walter-Stadion	Kaiserslautern, Germany	1. FC Kaiserslautern	3–2	25,873	Müller 23'; Can 68'; Shaqiri 86'	Dick 35'; Shechter 89'	
Mid-season friendlies
15 August	18:00	MAR Arena	Pyrbaum, Germany	SV Seligenporten	3–1	6,500	Friesenbichler 7', 30', 54'	Stolz 77'	
7 September		Allianz Arena	Munich, Germany	Qatar	1–0		Jelisic 45'	—	
11 October	15:00	Pitch No1 at Säbener Strasse	Munich, Germany	SpVgg Unterhaching	2–0	500	Jennings 42'; Can 70'	—	
25 October	18:00	Stadion an der Klosterstraße	Fürstenfeldbruck, Germany	SC Fürstenfeldbruck	7–0	3,000	Vastić 4', 47'; Sieghart 13', 44'; Pizarro 64'; Reinhardt 66', 70'	—	
13 November	18:00	Parkstadion	Markt Schwaben, Germany	Falke Markt Schwaben	6–0	2,200	Gómez 7', 28' (pen.), 30', 48'; Weiser 16'; Pizarro 45'	—	
5 January	16:30	Khalifa International Stadium	Doha, Qatar	Lekhwiya SC	4–0	1,503	Müller 26'; Van Buyten 64'; Pizarro 66', 76'	—	
8 January	17:00	Jassim Bin Hamad Stadium	Doha, Qatar	Schalke 04	5–0	2,000	Müller 10' (pen.), 20'; Mandžukić 33', 43'; Gómez 63'	—	
12 January	16:30	St. Jakob-Park	Basel, Switzerland	FC Basel	3–0	30,080	Mandžukić 8'; Schweinsteiger 11'; Ribéry 37'	—	
13 January	18:15	Generali Sportpark	Unterhaching, Germany	SpVgg Unterhaching	2–0	5,500	Pizarro 11'; Gómez 68'	—	
20 January	13:30	New Tivoli	Aachen, Germany	Alemannia Aachen	5–2	31,600	Gómez 28', 79'; Boateng 41'; Robben 74', 77'	Thiele 14'; Schwertfeger 56'	

- 1.Times in Central European Time/Central European Summer Time
- 2.Bayern goals listed first.

==== Pre-season cup matches ====
Round	Date	Time^{1}	Stadium	City	Opponent	Result^{2}	Attendance	Goalscorers		Source
Round	Date	Time^{1}	Stadium	City	Opponent	Result^{2}	Attendance	Bayern Munich	Opponent	Source
Yingli Cup
—	24 July	13:30	Workers Stadium	Beijing, China	Beijing Guoan	6–0	40,000	Pizarro 8', 44'; Robben 11'; Müller 74'; Mandžukić 79'; Gómez 80'	—	
Audi Football Summit
—	26 July	14:00	Guangdong Olympic Stadium	Guangzhou, China	VfL Wolfsburg	2–1	35,000	Mandžukić 29' (pen.); Robben 39'; Can (yellow card) 90+1'	Pilař 90+2'	
Paulaner Cup des Südens
—	31 July	20:15	Audi Sportpark	Ingolstadt, Germany	Paulaner XI	15–0	12,200	Müller 5', 18', 21'; Mandžukić 11'; Shaqiri 33', 41'; Lahm 39' (pen.); Kroos 57', 82'; Gómez 63', 71', 76', 77', 80'; Ribéry 79'	—	
LIGA total! Cup 2012
SF	4 August	18:35	Imtech Arena	Hamburg, Germany	Werder Bremen	2–2 (4-5p)	42,217	Shaqiri 27'; Kroos (yellow card) 37' (goal) 60'; Schweinsteiger (yellow card) 51'; (penalty scored) Mandžukić; (penalty scored) Kroos; (penalty missed) Ribéry; (penalty missed) Schweinsteiger	Petersen 12'; Füllkrug 43'; Junuzović (yellow card) 34'; Ekici (penalty scored); Fritz (penalty scored); Schmitz (penalty scored); De Bruyne (penalty scored)	
TP	5 August	16:45	Imtech Arena	Hamburg, Germany	Hamburger SV	1–0	45,000	Weiser 25'	—	
Traumspiel
—	26 August	14:00		Selters, Germany	Bayern Kings 1987 Selters/Ts.	17–0	13,500	Pizarro 4', 10', 35', 40'; Robben 15', 26'; Lahm 19', 40'; Weiser 27'; Neuer 45+1' (pen.); Schweinsteiger 45+2'; Tymoshchuk 52', 65'; Weihrauch 60'; Mandžukić 74'; Kroos 77'; Shaqiri 81'	—	

- 1.Times in Central European Time/Central European Summer Time
- 2.Bayern goals listed first.

=== Bundesliga ===
==== League table ====
Pos	Team	Pld	W	D	L	GF	GA	GD	Pts	Qualification or relegation
1	Bayern Munich (C)	34	29	4	1	98	18	+80	91	Qualification for the Champions League group stage
2	Borussia Dortmund	34	19	9	6	81	42	+39	66	Qualification for the Champions League group stage
3	Bayer Leverkusen	34	19	8	7	65	39	+26	65	Qualification for the Champions League group stage
4	Schalke 04	34	16	7	11	58	50	+8	55	Qualification for the Champions League play-off round
5	SC Freiburg	34	14	9	11	45	40	+5	51	Qualification for the Europa League group stage

Source: Bundesliga.de, kicker.de
Rules for classification: 1) points; 2) goal difference; 3) number of goals scored.
(C) Champions

==== Results summary ====
Overall								Home						Away					
Pld	W	D	L	GF	GA	GD	Pts	W	D	L	GF	GA	GD	W	D	L	GF	GA	GD
34	29	4	1	98	18	+80	91	14	2	1	56	11	+45	15	2	0	42	7	+35

Last updated: 18 May 2013.

==== League results ====
Match	Date	Ground	Opponent	Score^{1}	Pos.	Pts.	GD	Report
1	25 August	A	SpVgg Greuther Fürth	3 – 0	1	3	3	Report / Report link; Kick off / 15:30 CEST; Attendance / 18,000 (sell-out); Referee / Peter Gagelmann (Bremen); SpVgg Greuther Fürth / Bayern Munich; / Müller 43'; Mandžukić 59'; Kleine 78' (o.g.)
2	2 September	H	VfB Stuttgart	6 – 1	1	6	8	Report / Report link; Kick off / 17:30 CEST; Attendance / 71,000 (sell-out); Referee / Thorsten Kinhöfer (Herne); Bayern Munich / VfB Stuttgart; Müller 32', 49'; Kroos 33'; Luiz Gustavo 43'; Mandžukić 47'; Schweinsteiger 51'; Boateng (yellow card) 74' / Gentner (yellow card) 20'; Harnik 25'; Ibišević (red card) 74'
3	15 September	H	Mainz 05	3 – 1	1	9	10	Report / Report link; Kick off / 15:30 CEST; Attendance / 71,000 (sell-out); Referee / Markus Schmidt (Stuttgart); Bayern Munich / Mainz 05; Mandžukić 2'; Schweinsteiger 13'; Gustavo (yellow card) 60'; Kroos 90+2' / Kirchhoff (yellow card) 40'; Szalai 59' (pen.)
4	22 September	A	Schalke 04	2 – 0	1	12	12	Report / Report link; Kick off / 15:30 CEST; Attendance / 61,673 (sell-out); Referee / Knut Kircher (Rottenburg); Schalke 04 / Bayern Munich; Fuchs (yellow card) 76'; Matip (yellow card) 79' / Kroos 55'; Müller 58'
5	25 September	H	VfL Wolfsburg	3 – 0	1	15	15	Report / Report link; Kick off / 20:00 CEST; Attendance / 71,000 (sell-out); Referee / Christian Dingert (Thallichtenberg); Bayern Munich / VfL Wolfsburg; Schweinsteiger 24', (yellow card) 82'; Mandžukić 57', 65' / Kahlenberg (yellow card) 35'
6	29 September	A	Werder Bremen	2 – 0	1	18	17	Report / Report link; Kick off / 15:30 CEST; Attendance / 42,100 (sold out); Referee / Michael Weiner (Giesen); Werder Bremen / Bayern Munich; Papastathopoulos (yellow card) 14'; Arnautović (yellow card) 80' / Schweinsteiger (yellow card) 38'; Luiz Gustavo (yellow card) 40', (goal) 81'; Mandžukić 83'
7	6 October	H	1899 Hoffenheim	2 – 0	1	21	19	Report / Report link; Kick off / 15:30 CEST; Attendance / 71,000 (sell-out); Referee / Tobias Stieler (Obertshausen); Bayern Munich / 1899 Hoffenheim; Ribéry 19', 47' / Williams (yellow card) 55'; Beck (yellow card) 65'; Firmino (yellow card) 65'
8	20 October	A	Fortuna Düsseldorf	5 – 0	1	24	24	Report / Report link; Kick off / 15:30 CEST; Attendance / 54,000; Referee / Felix Zwayer (Berlin); Fortuna Düsseldorf / Bayern Munich; Levels (yellow card) 38'; Lambertz (yellow card) 41'; Van der Bergh (yellow card) 42' / Mandžukić 28'; Luiz Gustavo 36'; Müller 55', 86'; Dante (yellow card) 67'; Rafinha 87'
9	28 October	H	Bayer Leverkusen	1 – 2	1	24	23	Report / Report link; Kick off / 17:30 CET; Attendance / 71,000 (sell-out); Referee / Florian Meyer (Burgdorf); Bayern Munich / Bayer Leverkusen; Dante (yellow card) 24'; Mandžukić (yellow card) 57', (goal) 77'; Shaqiri (yellow card) 62' / Carvajal (yellow card) 7'; Kießling 42'; Boateng 86' (o.g.)
10	3 November	A	Hamburger SV	3 – 0	1	27	26	Report / Report link; Kick off / 18:30 CET; Attendance / 57,000 (sell-out); Referee / Knut Kircher (Rottenburg); Hamburger SV / Bayern Munich; Diekmeier (yellow card) 32'; Jansen (yellow card) 41' / Ribéry (yellow card) 24'; Schweinsteiger 40'; Müller 48'; Kroos 53'; Martínez (yellow card) 69'
11	10 November	H	Eintracht Frankfurt	2 – 0	1	30	28	Report / Report link; Kick off / 15:30 CET; Attendance / 71,000 (sell-out); Referee / Marco Fritz (Korb); Bayern Munich / Eintracht Frankfurt; Ribéry 44'; Alaba 77' (pen.) / Aigner (yellow card) 4'; Inui (yellow card) 13'; Demidov (yellow card) 41'
12	17 November	A	1. FC Nürnberg	1 – 1	1	31	28	Report / Report link; Kick off / 15:30 CET; Attendance / 50,000 (sell-out); Referee / Manuel Gräfe (Berlin); 1. FC Nürnberg / Bayern Munich; Feulner 46'; Chandler (yellow card) 52'; Polter (yellow card) 54'; Gebhart (yellow card) 58' (red card) 76' / Mandžukić 3'; Kroos (yellow card) 27'; Schweinsteiger (yellow card) 58'
13	24 November	H	Hannover 96	5 – 0	1	34	33	Report / Report link; Kick off / 15:30 CET; Attendance / 71,000 (sell-out); Referee / Felix Zwayer (Berlin); Bayern Munich / Hannover 96; Martínez 4'; Mandžukić (yellow card) 22'; Kroos 24'; Ribéry 37'; Schweinsteiger (yellow card) 39'; Dante 63'; Gómez 67' / Sobiech (yellow card) 42'; Stindl (yellow card) 55'; Schulz (yellow card) 62'
14	28 November	A	SC Freiburg	2 – 0	1	37	35	Report / Report link; Kick off / 20:00 CET; Attendance / 24,000 (sell-out); Referee / Florian Meyer (Burgdorf); SC Freiburg / Bayern Munich; Diagne (red card) 18'; Caligiuri (yellow card) 90+4' / Müller 12' (pen.); Neuer (yellow card) 74'; Tymoshchuk 79'
15	1 December	H	Borussia Dortmund	1 – 1	1	38	35	Report / Report link; Kick off / 18:30 CET; Attendance / 71,000 (sell-out); Referee / Peter Gagelmann (Bremen); Bayern Munich / Borussia Dortmund; Kroos 67' / Götze 74'
16	8 December	A	FC Augsburg	2 – 0	1	41	37	Report / Report link; Kick off / 15:30 CET; Attendance / 30,660 (sell-out); Referee / Jochen Drees (Münster-Sarmsheim); FC Augsburg / Bayern Munich; / Müller 40' (pen.); Gómez 62'
17	14 December	H	Borussia Mönchengladbach	1 – 1	1	42	37	Report / Report link; Kick off / 20:30 CET; Attendance / 71,000 (sell-out); Referee / Tobias Welz (Wiesbaden); Bayern Munich / Borussia Mönchengladbach; Dante (yellow card) 56'; Shaqiri 59' / Marx 21' (pen.); Nordtveit (yellow card) 26'; Ciğerci (yellow card) 70'
18	19 January	H	SpVgg Greuther Fürth	2 – 0	1	45	39	Report / Report link; Kick off / 15:30 CET; Attendance / 71,000 (sell-out); Referee / Markus Schmidt (Stuttgart); Bayern Munich / SpVgg Greuther Fürth; Mandžukić 26', 61'; Martínez (yellow card) 45' / Rahman (yellow card) 31'
19	27 January	A	VfB Stuttgart	2 – 0	1	48	41	Report / Report link; Kick off / 17:30 CET; Attendance / 60,441 (sell-out); Referee / Florian Meyer (Burgdorf); VfB Stuttgart / Bayern Munich; Harnik (yellow card) 32' (red card) 80'; Rüdiger (yellow card) 61' / Mandžukić 50'; Kroos (yellow card) 59'; Müller 72'
20	2 February	A	Mainz 05	3 – 0	1	51	44	Report / Report link; Kick off / 15:30 CET; Attendance / 34,000 (sell-out); Referee / Michael Weiner (Giesen); Mainz 05 / Bayern Munich; Zabavnik (yellow card) 25'; N. Müller (yellow card) 27'; Risse (yellow card) 88' / Müller 41'; Mandžukić 50', 57'
21	9 February	H	Schalke 04	4 – 0	1	54	48	Report / Report link; Kick off / 18:30 CET; Attendance / 71,000 (sell-out); Referee / Peter Gagelmann (Bremen); Bayern Munich / Schalke 04; Alaba 19' (pen.), 51'; Schweinsteiger 31'; Gómez 63' / Höger (yellow card) 56'
22	15 February	A	VfL Wolfsburg	2 – 0	1	57	50	Report / Report link; Kick off / 20:30 CET; Attendance / 30,000 (sell-out); Referee / Felix Zwayer (Berlin); VfL Wolfsburg / Bayern Munich; Madlung (yellow card) 25'; Vieirinha (yellow card) 35'; Dost (yellow card) 45+2'; Hasebe (yellow card) 73'; Naldo (yellow card) 80' / Mandžukić 36'; Ribéry (yellow card) 57'; Dante (yellow card) 76'; Robben 90+2'
23	23 February	H	Werder Bremen	6 – 1	1	60	55	Report / Report link; Kick off / 15:30 CET; Attendance / 71,000 (sell-out); Referee / Marco Fritz (Korb); Bayern Munich / Werder Bremen; Robben 25'; Martínez 29'; Gebre Selassie 49' (o.g.); Gómez 51', 89'; Ribéry 86' / Junuzović (yellow card) 28'; Prödl (red card) 44'; De Bruyne 58'; Pavlović (yellow card) 67'
24	3 March	A	1899 Hoffenheim	1 – 0	1	63	56	Report / Report link; Kick off / 15:30 CET; Attendance / 30,150 (sell-out); Referee / Thorsten Kinhöfer (Herne); 1899 Hoffenheim / Bayern Munich; Williams (yellow card) 54'; Schröck (yellow card) 69'; Derdiyok (yellow card) 82' / Boateng (yellow card) 13'; Gómez 38'
25	9 March	H	Fortuna Düsseldorf	3 – 2	1	66	57	Report / Report link; Kick off / 15:30 CET; Attendance / 71,000 (sell-out); Referee / Tobias Stieler (Obertshausen); Bayern Munich / Fortuna Düsseldorf; Müller 45'; Luiz Gustavo (yellow card) 58'; Ribéry 73'; Boateng 86' / Bolly 16'; Latka (yellow card) 38'; Lambertz 71'
26	16 March	A	Bayer Leverkusen	2 – 1	1	69	58	Report / Report link; Kick off / 18:30 CET; Attendance / 30,210 (sell-out); Referee / Peter Gagelmann (Bremen); Bayer Leverkusen / Bayern Munich; Carvajal (yellow card) 5'; Castro (yellow card) 54'; Rolfes 75'; Schwaab (yellow card) 90+2' / Gómez 37'; Wollscheid 87' (o.g.); Neuer (yellow card) 90+3'
27	30 March	H	Hamburger SV	9 – 2	1	72	65	Report / Report link; Kick off / 18:30 CET; Attendance / 71,000; Referee / Guido Winkmann (Kerken); Bayern Munich / Hamburger SV; Shaqiri 5'; Schweinsteiger 19'; Pizarro 30', 45', 53', 68'; Robben 33', 54'; Ribéry 76' / Bruma 75'; Westermann 86'
28	6 April	A	Eintracht Frankfurt	1 – 0	1	75	66	Report / Report link; Kick off / 15:30 CEST; Attendance / 51,500 (sell-out); Referee / Florian Meyer (Burgdorf); Eintracht Frankfurt / Bayern Munich; Aigner (yellow card) 34' / Schweinsteiger 52'; Luiz Gustavo (yellow card) 65'; Martínez (yellow card) 85'
29	13 April	H	1. FC Nürnberg	4 – 0	1	78	70	Report / Report link; Kick off / 15:30 CEST; Attendance / 71,000 (sell-out); Referee / Michael Weiner (Giesen); Bayern Munich / 1. FC Nürnberg; Boateng 5'; Gómez 17'; Rafinha 24', (yellow card) 47'; Shaqiri 56' / Nilsson (yellow card) 44'; Pinola (yellow card) 70'
30	20 April	A	Hannover 96	6 – 1	1	81	75	Report / Report link; Kick off / 15:30 CEST; Attendance / 49,000 (sell-out); Referee / Felix Zwayer (Berlin); Hannover 96 / Bayern Munich; Hoffmann 84' / Stindl 16' (o.g.); Ribéry 22'; Gómez 40', 62'; Pizarro 71', 86'; Boateng (yellow card) 88'
31	27 April	H	SC Freiburg	1 – 0	1	84	76	Report / Report link; Kick off / 15:30 CEST; Attendance / 71,000 (sell-out); Referee / Christian Dingert (Thallichtenberg); Bayern Munich / SC Freiburg; Can 35'; Tymoshchuk (yellow card) 46' / Caligiuri (yellow card) 68'
32	4 May	A	Borussia Dortmund	1 – 1	1	85	76	Report / Report link; Kick off / 18:30 CEST; Attendance / 80,645 (sell-out); Referee / Peter Gagelmann (Bremen); Borussia Dortmund / Bayern Munich; Großkreutz 11'; Błaszczykowski (yellow card) 64' / Tymoshchuk (yellow card) 10'; Gómez 23'; Luiz Gustavo (yellow card) 39'; Boateng (yellow card) 45+1'; Rafinha (red card) 65'; Can (yellow card) 84'
33	11 May	H	FC Augsburg	3 – 0	1	88	79	Report / Report link; Kick off / 15:30 CEST; Attendance / 71,000 (sell-out); Referee / Marco Fritz (Korb); Bayern Munich / FC Augsburg; Müller 69'; Shaqiri 82'; Luiz Gustavo 88' / Morávek (yellow card) 31'
34	18 May	A	Borussia Mönchengladbach	4 – 3	1	91	80	Report / Report link; Kick off / 15:30 CEST; Attendance / 54,010 (sell-out); Referee / Thorsten Kinhöfer (Herne); Borussia Mönchengladbach / Bayern Munich; Stranzl 4'; Hanke 5'; Nordtveit 10' / Martínez 7'; Ribéry 18', 53'; Robben 59'

Last updated: 18 May 2013
^{1}Bayern Munich goals come first.
Ground's country's flag and opponent's country's flag shown when from a different country of Bayern Munich.
Pos. = Position in league, Pts. = Points, GD = Goal difference, Ground: H = Home, A = Away, N = Neutral, HR = Home replacement, AR = Away replacement.

=== DFB-Pokal ===
20 August 2012 Round 1	Jahn Regensburg	0–4	Bayern Munich	Regensburg
20:30 CEST	Sembolo (yellow card) 76'	Report	Mandžukić 32', 80', (yellow card) 74'; Müller (yellow card) 38'; Shaqiri 60'; Pizarro 88'; Boateng (yellow card) 90'	Stadium: Jahnstadion; Attendance: 12,500 (capacity); Referee: Guido Winkmann (Kerken)

31 October 2012 Round 2	Bayern Munich	4–0	1. FC Kaiserslautern	Munich
20:30 CET	Pizarro 11', 58'; Robben 49', 88'	Report	Heintz (yellow card) 30'; Hajri (yellow card) 53'	Stadium: Allianz Arena; Attendance: 71,000 (capacity); Referee: Daniel Siebert (Berlin)

18 December 2012 Round of 16	FC Augsburg	0–2	Bayern Munich	Augsburg
20:30 CET	Philp (yellow card) 25'; Koo (yellow card) 47'; Mölders (yellow card) 65'	Report	Gómez 26'; Dante (yellow card) 47'; Ribéry (red card) 47'; Alaba (yellow card) 51'; Tymoshchuk (yellow card) 52'; Kroos (yellow card) 70'; Shaqiri 85'	Stadium: SGL arena Attendance: 30,660 (sell-out); Referee: Thorsten Kinhöfer (Herne)

27 February 2013 Quarter-finals	Bayern Munich	1–0	Borussia Dortmund	Munich
20:30 CET	Robben 43'; Martínez (yellow card) 63'; Kroos (yellow card) 67'; Mandžukić (yellow card) 78'	Report		Stadium: Allianz Arena; Attendance: 71,000 (sell-out); Referee: Knut Kircher (Rottenburg)

16 April 2013 Semi-finals	Bayern Munich	6–1	VfL Wolfsburg	Munich
20:30 CEST	Mandžukić 17'; Robben 35'; Shaqiri 50'; Gómez 80', 83', 86'; Schweinsteiger (yellow card) 81'	Report	Diego 45'; Naldo (yellow card) 53'; Polák (yellow card) 62'	Stadium: Allianz Arena; Attendance: 71,000 (sell-out); Referee: Knut Kircher (Rottenburg)

1 June 2013 Final	Bayern Munich	3–2	VfB Stuttgart	Berlin
20:00 CEST	Müller 37' (pen.); Gómez 48', 61'; Schweinsteiger (yellow card) 50'; Mandžukić (yellow card) 90+4'	Report	Traoré (yellow card) 36'; Harnik 71', 80'; Boka (yellow card) 85'; Ibišević (yellow card) 90+1'	Stadium: Olympic Stadium; Attendance: 74,244 (sell-out); Referee: Manuel Gräfe (Berlin)

=== DFL-Supercup ===
12 August 2012 Final	Bayern Munich	2–1	Borussia Dortmund	Munich
20:00 CEST	Mandžukić 6', (yellow card) 68'; Müller 11'; Luiz Gustavo (yellow card) 28'; Can (yellow card) 38'; Robben (yellow card) 82'	Report	Schmelzer (yellow card) 42'; Lewandowski 75'	Stadium: Allianz Arena; Attendance: 69,901 (capacity); Referee: Michael Weiner (Giesen)

=== UEFA Champions League ===
==== Group stage (Group F) ====
===== Group results =====
19 September 2012 1	Bayern Munich (Germany)	2–1	(Spain) Valencia	Munich, Germany
20:45 CEST	Schweinsteiger 38'; Kroos 76'; Mandžukić (penalty missed) 90+4'	Report	T. Costa (yellow card) 75'; Rami (yellow card) 85' (yellow-red card) 90+3'; Valdez 90+1'	Stadium: Allianz Arena; Attendance: 68,000 (capacity); Referee: Fırat Aydınus (Turkey)

2 October 2012 2	BATE Borisov (Belarus)	3–1	(Germany) Bayern Munich	Minsk, Belarus
20:45 CEST	Pavlov (yellow card) 22', (goal) 23'; Bordachev (yellow card) 70'; Rodionov 78'; Bressan 90+4'	Report	Badstuber (yellow card) 50'; Dante (yellow card) 58'; Luiz Gustavo (yellow card) 72'; Ribéry 90+1'; Pizarro (yellow card) 90+2'	Stadium: Dynamo Stadium; Attendance: 24,636; Referee: Aleksandar Stavrev (Macedonia)

23 October 2012 3	Lille (France)	0–1	(Germany) Bayern Munich	Villeneuve d'Ascq, France
20:45 CEST	Sidibé (yellow card) 33'; Pedretti (yellow card) 45+1'; Digne (yellow card) 53'	Report	Müller 20' (pen.); Boateng (yellow card) 32'; Martínez (yellow card) 32'; Mandžukić (yellow card) 70'; Shaqiri (yellow card) 90'; Schweinsteiger (yellow card) 90+3'	Stadium: Grand Stade Lille Métropole; Attendance: 45,259; Referee: Martin Atkinson (England)

7 November 2012 4	Bayern Munich (Germany)	6–1	(France) Lille	Munich, Germany
20:45 CET	Schweinsteiger 5', (yellow card) 64'; Pizarro 18', 28', 33'; Robben 23'; Kroos 66'; Ribéry (yellow card) 72'; Tymoshchuk (yellow card) 78'	Report	Debuchy (yellow card) 21'; Kalou 58'; Balmont (yellow card) 63'; Mavuba (yellow card) 77'	Stadium: Allianz Arena; Attendance: 68,000 (capacity); Referee: Ovidiu Alin Hategan (Romania)

20 November 2012 5	Valencia (Spain)	1–1	(Germany) Bayern Munich	Valencia, Spain
20:45 CET	Barragán (yellow card) 20' (red card) 33'; Feghouli 77'; Soldado (yellow card) 84'; Guaita (yellow card) 88'	Report	Dante (yellow card) 26'; Martínez (yellow card) 45+1'; Müller 82'	Stadium: Mestalla Stadium; Attendance: 50,000; Referee: Howard Webb (England)

5 December 2012 6	Bayern Munich (Germany)	4–1	(Belarus) BATE Borisov	Munich, Germany
20:45 CET	Gómez 22'; Boateng (red card) 50'; Rafinha (yellow card) 51'; Müller 53'; Shaqiri 66'; Alaba 83'	Report	Palyakow (yellow card) 34' (red card) 69'; Vasilyuk (yellow card) 74'; Filipenko 89'	Stadium: Allianz Arena; Attendance: 68,000 (sell-out); Referee: William Collum (Scotland)

Last updated: 5 December 2012
Source: UEFA.com

===== Group standings =====
Pos	Team	Pld	W	D	L	GF	GA	GD	Pts	Qualification	BAY	VAL	BATE	LIL
1	(Germany) Bayern Munich	6	4	1	1	15	7	+8	13 (Note: Head-to-head points: Bayern Munich 4, Valencia 1.)	Advance to knockout phase	—	2–1	4–1	6–1
2	(Spain) Valencia	6	4	1	1	12	5	+7	13	Advance to knockout phase	1–1	—	4–2	2–0
3	(Belarus) BATE Borisov	6	2	0	4	9	15	−6	6	Transfer to Europa League	3–1	0–3	—	0–2
4	(France) Lille	6	1	0	5	4	13	−9	3		0–1	0–1	1–3	—

Source: Soccerway

===== Results summary =====
Overall								Home						Away					
Pld	W	D	L	GF	GA	GD	Pts	W	D	L	GF	GA	GD	W	D	L	GF	GA	GD
6	4	1	1	15	7	+8	13	3	0	0	12	3	+9	1	1	1	3	4	−1

Last updated: 5 December 2012.

==== Knockout phase ====
===== Round of 16 =====
19 February 2013 First leg	Arsenal (England)	1–3	(Germany) Bayern Munich	London, England
20:45 CET	Vermaelen (yellow card) 15'; Sagna (yellow card) 22'; Arteta (yellow card) 25'; Podolski 55', (yellow card) 66'; Ramsey (yellow card) 67'	Report	Kroos 7'; Müller 21', (yellow card) 58'; Schweinsteiger (yellow card) 36'; Mandžukić 77'; Lahm (yellow card) 89'	Stadium: Emirates Stadium; Attendance: 59,974; Referee: Svein Oddvar Moen (Norway)

13 March 2013 Second leg	Bayern Munich (Germany)	0–2 (3a–3 agg.)	(England) Arsenal	Munich, Germany
20:45 CET	Lahm (yellow card) 57'; Martínez (yellow card) 83'; Gómez (yellow card) 89'	Report	Giroud 3', (yellow card) 73'; Gibbs (yellow card) 44'; Rosický (yellow card) 62'; Mertesacker (yellow card) 80'; Cazorla (yellow card) 83'; Koscielny 85', (yellow card) 87'	Stadium: Allianz Arena; Attendance: 68,000; Referee: Pavel Královec (Czech Republic)
Note: Bayern Munich win on away goals rule

===== Quarter-finals =====
2 April 2013 First leg	Bayern Munich (Germany)	2–0	(Italy) Juventus	Munich, Germany
20:45 CEST	Alaba 1'; Mandžukić (yellow card) 44'; Müller 63'; Luiz Gustavo (yellow card) 82'	Report	Chiellini (yellow card) 54'; Vidal (yellow card) 67'; Lichtsteiner (yellow card) 76'	Stadium: Allianz Arena; Attendance: 68,000; Referee: Mark Clattenburg (England)

10 April 2013 Second leg	Juventus (Italy)	0–2 (0–4 agg.)	(Germany) Bayern Munich	Turin, Italy
20:45 CEST	Bonucci (yellow card) 13'	Report	Mandžukić (yellow card) 8', (goal) 64'; Pizarro 90+1'	Stadium: Juventus Stadium; Attendance: 40,823; Referee: Carlos Velasco Carballo (Spain)

===== Semi-finals =====
23 April 2013 First leg	Bayern Munich (Germany)	4–0	(Spain) Barcelona	Munich, Germany
20:45 CEST	Müller 25', 82'; Gómez (yellow card) 37', (goal) 49'; Martínez (yellow card) 46'; Robben 73'; Schweinsteiger (yellow card) 87'	Report	Bartra (yellow card) 39'; Sánchez (yellow card) 86'; Alba (yellow card) 89'; Iniesta (yellow card) 90+2'	Stadium: Allianz Arena; Attendance: 68,000 (sell-out); Referee: Viktor Kassai (Hungary)

1 May 2013 Second leg	Barcelona (Spain)	0–3 (0–7 agg.)	(Germany) Bayern Munich	Barcelona, Spain
20:45 CEST	Alves (yellow card) 45'; Piqué (yellow card) 79'	Report	Robben (yellow card) 32', (goal) 48'; Piqué 72' (o.g.); Müller 76'	Stadium: Camp Nou; Attendance: 95,877 (sell-out); Referee: Damir Skomina (Slovenia)

===== Final =====
25 May 2013 Final	Borussia Dortmund	1–2	Bayern Munich	London, England
20:45 CEST	Gündoğan 68' (pen.); Großkreutz (yellow card) 74'	Report	Dante (yellow card) 29'; Mandžukić 60'; Ribéry (yellow card) 74'; Robben 89'	Stadium: Wembley Stadium; Attendance: 86,298; Referee: Nicola Rizzoli (Italy)

== Team statistics ==
=== Record ===
==== Record by competition ====
Competition	First match	Last match	Starting round	Final position	Record								
Competition	First match	Last match	Starting round	Final position	G	W	D	L	GF	GA	GD	Win %	Ref.
Bundesliga	25 August 2012	18 May 2013	Matchday 1	Winner	34	29	4	1	98	18	+80	85.29	
DFB-Pokal	20 August 2012	1 June 2013	Round 1	Winner	6	6	0	0	20	3	+17	100.00	
DFL-Supercup	12 August 2012		Final	Winner	1	1	0	0	2	1	+1	100.00	
Champions League	19 September 2012	25 May 2013	Group stage	Winner	13	10	1	2	31	11	+20	76.92	
Total					54	46	5	3	151	33	+118	85.19	

== Squad information ==
=== Squad and statistics ===
==== Squad, appearances and goals ====
Squad Season 2012–2013
No.	Player	Nat.	Birthdate	at FCB since	previous club	BL matches	BL goals	Cup matches	Cup goals	CL matches	CL goals
Goalkeepers
1	Manuel Neuer	German	27 March 1986	2011	Schalke 04	31	0	5	0	13	0
22	Tom Starke	German	18 March 1981	2012	1899 Hoffenheim	3	0	1	0	0	0
24	Maximilian Riedmüller	German	4 January 1988	2008	SV Heimstetten	0	0	0	0	0	0
32	Lukas Raeder	German	30 December 1993	2012	Schalke 04	0	0	0	0	0	0
Defenders
4	Dante	Brazilian	18 October 1983	2012	M'gladbach	29	1	3	0	11(1)	0
5	Daniel Van Buyten	Belgen	7 February 1978	2006	Hamburger SV	11(2)	0	4	0	6	0
13	Rafinha	Brazilian	7 September 1985	2011	Genoa	6(7)	2	1(1)	0	1(1)	0
17	Jérôme Boateng	German	3 September 1988	2011	Manchester City	25(1)	2	3(1)	0	8(1)	0
21	Philipp Lahm (captain)	German	11 November 1983	1995	Junior Team	28(1)	0	5	0	12	0
26	Diego Contento	German	1 May 1990	1995	Junior Team	4(1)	0	2	0	1	0
27	David Alaba	Austrian	24 June 1992	2008	Junior Team	22(1)	3	4	0	9(2)	2
28	Holger Badstuber	German	13 March 1989	2002	Junior Team	12	0	1	0	4	0
Midfielders
7	Franck Ribéry	French	7 April 1983	2007	Marseille	24(3)	10	3	0	11(1)	1
8	Javi Martínez	Spanish	2 September 1988	2012	Athletic Bilbao	19(8)	3	4(1)	0	11	0
10	Arjen Robben	Dutch	23 January 1984	2009	Real Madrid	11(5)	5	5	4	7(2)	4
11	Xherdan Shaqiri	Swiss	10 October 1991	2012	Basel	13(13)	4	3(2)	3	1(6)	1
23	Mitchell Weiser	German	21 April 1994	2012	1. FC Köln	0	0	0(1)	0	0	0
25	Thomas Müller	German	13 September 1989	2000	Junior Team	25(3)	13	4(1)	1	12(1)	8
30	Luiz Gustavo	Brazilian	23 July 1987	2011	1899 Hoffenheim	16(6)	4	1(2)	0	3(7)	0
31	Bastian Schweinsteiger (vice-captain)	German	1 August 1984	1998	Junior Team	27(1)	7	4(1)	0	11(1)	2
34	Pierre-Emile Højbjerg	Denmark	5 August 1995	2012	Brøndby IF	0(2)	0	0	0	0	0
36	Emre Can	German	12 January 1994	2009	Junior Team	2(2)	1	2	0	0	0
39	Toni Kroos	German	4 January 1990	2006	Junior Team	23(1)	6	3	0	8(1)	3
44	Anatoliy Tymoshchuk	Ukrainian	30 March 1979	2009	Zenit	5(11)	1	2(1)	0	1(3)	0
Forwards
9	Mario Mandžukić	Croatian	21 May 1986	2012	VfL Wolfsburg	22(2)	15	3(2)	3	8(2)	3
14	Claudio Pizarro	Peruvian	3 October 1978	2012	Werder Bremen	7(13)	6	1(1)	3	3(3)	4
20	Patrick Weihrauch	German	3 March 1994	2010	Junior Team	0	0	0	0	0	0
33	Mario Gómez	German	10 July 1985	2009	VfB Stuttgart	9(12)	11	2(2)	6	2(5)	2
Last updated: 1 June 2013
Note: Numbers in parentheses denotes substitution appearances

==== Minutes played ====
No.	Player	Total	Bundesliga	DFB-Pokal	DFB-Supercup	Champions League	Sources
1	Manuel Neuer	4,410	2,790	360	90	1,170	
4	Dante	3,997	2,610	270	90	1,027	
31	Bastian Schweinsteiger	3,582	2,358	285	0	939	
25	Thomas Müller	3,478	2,093	248	90	1,047	
17	Jérôme Boateng	3,290	2,245	180	90	775	
7	Franck Ribéry	3,258	2,113	212	80	853	
27	David Alaba	3,105	1,993	270	0	842	
8	Javi Martínez	2,981	1,758	302	0	921	
39	Toni Kroos	2,856	1,923	253	90	590	
9	Mario Mandžukić	2,831	1,741	280	90	720	
10	Arjen Robben	2,147	986	329	8	731	
30	Luiz Gustavo	2,042	1,454	129	90	369	
11	Xherdan Shaqiri	1,901	1,372	315	5	209	
14	Claudio Pizarro	1,163	744	171	0	248	
33	Mario Gómez	1,123	877	45	0	201	
44	Anatoliy Tymoshchuk	877	581	148	10	136	
13	Rafinha	766	568	95	0	103	
36	Emre Can	394	214	180	0	0	
22	Tom Starke	360	270	90	0	0	
Updated: 25 May 2013

==== Discipline ====
===== Bookings =====
No.	Player	Bundesliga			DFB-Pokal			DFL-Supercup			Champions League			Total		
No.	Player	Yellow card	(yellow card) (red card)	Red card	Yellow card	(yellow card) (red card)	Red card	Yellow card	(yellow card) (red card)	Red card	Yellow card	(yellow card) (red card)	Red card	Yellow card	(yellow card) (red card)	Red card
31	Bastian Schweinsteiger	4	0	0	2	0	0	0	0	0	4	0	0	10	0	0
30	Luiz Gustavo	6	0	0	0	0	0	1	0	0	2	0	0	9	0	0
9	Mario Mandžukić	2	0	0	3	0	0	1	0	0	3	0	0	9	0	0
8	Javi Martínez	3	0	0	1	0	0	0	0	0	4	0	0	8	0	0
4	Dante	4	0	0	1	0	0	0	0	0	3	0	0	8	0	0
17	Jérôme Boateng	5	0	0	1	0	0	0	0	0	1	0	1	7	0	1
39	Toni Kroos	2	0	0	2	0	0	0	0	0	0	0	0	4	0	0
44	Anatoliy Tymoshchuk	2	0	0	1	0	0	0	0	0	1	0	0	4	0	0
7	Franck Ribéry	2	0	0	0	0	1	0	0	0	2	0	0	4	0	1
13	Rafinha	2	1	0	0	0	0	0	0	0	0	0	0	2	1	0
1	Manuel Neuer	2	0	0	0	0	0	0	0	0	0	0	0	2	0	0
11	Xherdan Shaqiri	1	0	0	0	0	0	0	0	0	1	0	0	2	0	0
21	Philipp Lahm	0	0	0	0	0	0	0	0	0	2	0	0	2	0	0
33	Mario Gómez	0	0	0	0	0	0	0	0	0	2	0	0	2	0	0
10	Arjen Robben	0	0	0	0	0	0	1	0	0	1	0	0	2	0	0
36	Emre Can	1	0	0	0	0	0	1	0	0	0	0	0	2	0	0
27	David Alaba	0	0	0	1	0	0	0	0	0	0	0	0	1	0	0
28	Holger Badstuber	0	0	0	0	0	0	0	0	0	1	0	0	1	0	0
25	Thomas Müller	0	0	0	0	0	0	0	0	0	1	0	0	1	0	0
14	Claudio Pizarro	0	0	0	0	0	0	0	0	0	1	0	0	1	0	0
Totals		36	1	0	11	0	1	4	0	0	29	0	1	80	1	2
Updated: 1 June 2013

===== Suspensions =====
No.	Player	No. of matches served	Reason	Competition served in	Date served	Opponent(s)	Source
17	Jérôme Boateng	2	Red card vs. BATE Borisov.	UCL	19 February	Arsenal	
17	Jérôme Boateng	2	Red card vs. BATE Borisov.	UCL	13 March	Arsenal	
7	Franck Ribéry	2	Red card vs. FC Augsburg.	DFB-Pokal	27 February	Borussia Dortmund	
7	Franck Ribéry	2	Red card vs. FC Augsburg.	DFB-Pokal	16 April	VfL Wolfsburg	
31	Bastian Schweinsteiger	1	Third yellow card.	UCL	13 March	Arsenal	
8	Javi Martínez	1	Third yellow card.	UCL	4 April	Juventus	
30	Luiz Gustavo	1	Fifth yellow card.	Bundesliga	13 April	1. FC Nürnberg	
9	Mario Mandžukić	1	Third yellow card.	UCL	23 April	Barcelona	
13	Rafinha	2	Red card vs. Borussia Dortmund.	Bundesliga	11 May	FC Augsburg	
13	Rafinha	2	Red card vs. Borussia Dortmund.	Bundesliga	18 May	Borussia Mönchengladbach	
17	Jérôme Boateng	1	Fifth yellow card.	Bundesliga	11 May	FC Augsburg	

=== Transfers ===
==== In ====
No.	Pos.	Name	Age	EU	Moving from	Type	Transfer Window	Contract ends	Transfer fee	Sources
11	MF	Xherdan Shaqiri	20	No	Basel	Transfer	Summer	2016	€9 million	
14	FW	Claudio Pizarro	33	No	Werder Bremen	End of contract	Summer	2013	Free	
22	GK	Tom Starke	31	Yes	1899 Hoffenheim	Transfer	Summer	2015	Undisclosed	
4	DF	Dante	28	No	Borussia Mönchengladbach	Transfer	Summer	2016	€4.5 million	
9	FW	Mario Mandžukić	26	Yes	VfL Wolfsburg	Transfer	Summer	2016	€13.5 million	
23	MF	Mitchell Weiser	18	Yes	1. FC Köln	Transfer	Summer	2015	€500,000	
32	GK	Lukas Raeder	18	Yes	Schalke 04	Transfer	Summer	2014	Undisclosed	
8	MF	Javi Martínez	23	Yes	Athletic Bilbao	Transfer	Summer	2017	€40 million	

==== Out ====
No.	Pos.	Name	Age	EU	Moving to	Type	Transfer Window	Transfer fee	Sources
14	MF	Takashi Usami	20	No	1899 Hoffenheim	End of loan	Summer	—	
2	DF	Breno	22	No	—	End of contract	Summer	Free	
22	GK	Hans-Jörg Butt	38	Yes	—	Retired	—	—	
32	GK	Rouven Sattelmaier	24	Yes	1. FC Heidenheim	End of contract	Summer	Free	
11	FW	Ivica Olić	32	Yes	VfL Wolfsburg	End of contract	Summer	Free	
23	MF	Danijel Pranjić	30	Yes	Sporting CP	End of contract	Summer	Free	
9	FW	Nils Petersen	23	Yes	Werder Bremen	Loan	Summer	€500,000	

== Awards ==
Philipp Lahm, Manuel Neuer and Mario Gómez were nominated for the FIFA Ballon d'Or. Jupp Heynckes was nominated for FIFA World Coach of the Year.
