= Dan Morgan (footballer) =

New Zealand footballer (born 1990)

Personal information
- Full name: Daniel Harlee Morgan
- Date of birth: 20 November 1990 (age 35)
- Place of birth: Auckland, New Zealand
- Height: 1.82 m (6 ft 0 in)
- Positions: Left wing; left back

Team information
- Current team: Peninsula Power

Youth career
- –2009: Auckland City

Senior career*
Years	Team	Apps	(Gls)
2009–2011	Auckland City	12	(1)
2012–2014	Waitakere United	9	(1)
2014–2016	Birkenhead United		
2016–2017	Waitakere United	17	(7)
2017–2019	Auckland City	30	(4)
2019–2022	Maritzburg United	45	(0)
2022–	Peninsula Power	12	(2)
- * Club domestic league appearances and goals as of 10 November 2022

Daniel Harlee Morgan (born 20 November 1990) is a New Zealand professional footballer who plays as a winger or left back for Peninsula Power.

== Honours ==
Auckland City FC

- OFC Champions League : 2024
