= James Hoyt (footballer) =

Fijian footballer (born 1990)

Personal information
- Date of birth: 28 September 1990 (age 36)
- Position: Winger

Team information
- Current team: Manurewa

Senior career*
Years	Team	Apps	(Gls)
–2015	Central United		
2015	Ba	0	(0)
2016	Wairarapa United		
2016–2017	Tasman United	8	(1)
2018	Manukau United		
2018	Franklin United		
2019–2020	Bucklands Beach		
2021	Manurewa AFC		
2022	Manukau United	18	(0)
2023	Manurewa AFC	27	(0)
2024	Rewa	0	(0)
2024–	Manurewa AFC	10	(2)

International career
2017	Fiji	1	(0)
- * Club domestic league appearances and goals as of 21 January 2025

James Hoyt (born 28 September 1990) is a Fijian footballer who plays as a winger for Manurewa. He is the son of former Fijian footballer Mudu Hoyt.

== Career ==
Hoyt started his career with New Zealand side Central United. In 2015, he signed for Ba in Fiji. Before the 2016 season, Hoyt signed for New Zealand second-tier club Wairarapa United. In 2016, he signed for Tasman United in the New Zealand top flight. Before the 2018 season, Hoyt signed for New Zealand second-tier team Manukau United.

In 2018, he signed for Franklin United in the New Zealand fourth tier. Before the 2019 season, he signed for New Zealand third tier outfit Bucklands Beach. Before the 2021 season, Hoyt signed for Manurewa in the New Zealand second tier.
