= Landesliga Württemberg =

- Organising body: Württemberg Football Association
- Founded: 1945
- Country: Germany
- Divisions: 4
- Number of clubs: 71
- Level on pyramid: 7
- Promotion to: Verbandsliga Württemberg
- Relegation to: Bezirksliga (16 divisions)
- Current champions: SF Schwäbisch Hall; SC Geislingen; VfL Nagold; FV Olympia Laupheim (2021–22)

The Landesliga Württemberg (consisting of four divisions) is the second highest league of the Württemberg Football Association and the seventh highest league in the German football league system. It was first carried out between 1945 and 1950. In today's form, consisting of four divisions, it has existed since 1978.

== History ==
=== Landesliga Württemberg 1945-1950 ===
Landesliga Württemberg first existed from 1945 to 1950 as a second-class league and played on the same level with the Verbandsliga Südwürttemberg, which was organized by the Südwestdeutscher Fußballverband. In 1950, both leagues merged to third-class Amateurliga Württemberg.

==== Founding football clubs in 1949-50 season ====
TSG Ulm 1846, Sportfreunde Stuttgart, 1. Göppinger SV, Stuttgarter SC, SSV Ulm 1846, SpVgg Feuerbach, VfR Aalen, Union Böckingen, FV Zuffenhausen

=== Landesliga Württemberg from 1978 onwards ===
Starting in the 1978–79 season, the new Landesliga Württemberg was introduced with four divisions. In 1978 it was the fifth league level below the Bundesliga, 2nd Bundesliga (South), Oberliga Baden-Württemberg and Verbandsliga Württemberg.

== Promotion and relegation ==
The champions of the four divisions are automatically promoted to the Verbandsliga Württemberg. The four runners-up compete against each other in the relegation round for the Verbandsliga. There they participate in two knockout rounds. The runner-up who wins advances to compete in an additional relegation match against the club from the Verbandsliga that ended the season in the relegation place. The normal number of teams per season is 16. If there are more teams descending from the Verbandsliga than teams being promoted out of the district league or more teams promoted to the Verbandsliga than teams descending to the district league, then the number of teams increases. When this occurs, the "tightened" relegation rule applies in the following season. In this case, the number of teams that descends is increased to the number of teams that exceeds the usual 16 participating teams.
