= 2019 Port Vila FA Cup =

- Season: 2019

The 2019 Port Vila FA Cup or the 2019 PVFA Opening Cup, is a cup in the country of Vanuatu, held for association football clubs competing in the Port Vila Football League. It is run and overseen by the Port Vila Football Association.

There were three cups running at the same time, one for each division of Port Vila Football League.

== Participants ==
Port Vila Premier League Opening Cup	Port Vila First Division Opening Cup	Port Vila Second Division Opening Cup
Level on pyramid – 1	Level on pyramid – 2	Level on pyramid – 3
Erakor Golden Star; Ifira Black Bird; ABM Galaxy; Mauwia; Sia-Raga; Tafea; Yatel; Tupuji Imere	Shepherds United; Mauriki; United Malampa; Easton; AS Ambassadors; North Efate United; Pango Green Bird; Seveners United	Kings United; Van Warriors; Melakel; Black Diamond; Narak Tegapu; Redal; Teouma Academy; Varona

All teams and leagues are for the 2019/20 season

== Premier League Cup - 2019 Edition ==
=== Group A ===
Pos	Team	Pld	W	D	L	GF	GA	GD	Pts	Qualification or relegation
1	ABM Galaxy	3	3	0	0	17	0	+17	9	Qualification to Semifinals
2	Ifira Black Bird	3	2	0	1	5	5	0	6	Qualification to Semifinals
3	Yatel	3	1	0	2	2	10	−8	3	
4	Mauwia	3	0	0	3	1	10	−9	0	

Updated to match(es) played on 25 August 2019. Source:

Home \ Away	GAL	YAT	IFI	MAU
ABM Galaxy	—	7–0	4–0	6–0
Yatel	-	—	0–3	2–0
Ifira Black Bird	-	-	—	2–1
Mauwia	-	-	-	—

Updated to match(es) played on 25 August 2019. Source:
Legend: Blue = home team win; Yellow = draw; Red = away team win.
For upcoming matches, an "a" indicates there is an article about the rivalry between the two participants.

=== Group B ===
Pos	Team	Pld	W	D	L	GF	GA	GD	Pts	Qualification or relegation
1	Tafea	3	3	0	0	7	3	+4	9	Qualification to Semifinals
2	Tupuji Imere	3	2	0	1	10	4	+6	6	Qualification to Semifinals
3	Erakor Golden Star	3	1	0	2	2	4	−2	3	
4	Sia-Raga	3	0	0	3	0	8	−8	0	

Updated to match(es) played on 25 August 2019. Source:

Home \ Away	TAF	TUP	EGS	SIA
Tafea	—	4–3	2–0	1–0
Tupuji Imere	-	—	2–0	5–0
Erakor Golden Star	-	-	—	2–0
Sia-Raga	-	-	-	—

Updated to match(es) played on 25 August 2019. Source:
Legend: Blue = home team win; Yellow = draw; Red = away team win.
For upcoming matches, an "a" indicates there is an article about the rivalry between the two participants.

=== Semi-finals ===
31 August 2019

Galaxy	1-0	Tupuji Imere
Bong Kalo

Korman Stadium, Port Vila
31 August 2019

Tafea	2-0	Ifira Black Bird
Junior Felix; Malakai Tommy

Korman Stadium, Port Vila

=== Final ===
7 September 2019

Tafea	v	Galaxy

Korman Stadium, Port Vila

== See also ==
- Port Vila Shield
- VFF National Super League
- Port Vila FA Cup
- Port Vila Football League
- 2019-20 Port Vila Premier League
- Sport in Vanuatu
