= 2019 PVFA Cup =

2019 Port Vila FA Cup
Tournament details
- Country: Vanuatu
- Dates: 10 August – 7 September
- Teams: 8

Tournament statistics
- Matches played: 16
- Goals scored: 49 (3.06 per match)

The 2019 Port Vila FA Cup or the 2019 PVFA Cup for short, is the national cup in the country of Vanuatu, held for association football clubs competing in the Port Vila Football League (from 3 division). It is run and overseen by the Port Vila Football Association.

It's originally a tournament held as a pre-season competition for the 8 teams that play in the Digicel Premier League. This season we had three cups, one for each division of Port Vila FA.

== Premier League Opening Cup ==
=== Teams ===
The eight teams in the cup are the teams that will play the 2019-20 Port Vila Premier League

- ABM Galaxy
- Erakor Golden Star
- Ifira Black Bird
- Mauwia
- Sia-Raga
- Tafea
- Tupuji Imere
- Yatel

=== Group stage ===
==== Group A ====
Pos	Team	Pld	W	D	L	GF	GA	GD	Pts	Qualification or relegation
1	ABM Galaxy	3	3	0	0	17	0	+17	9	Qualification to Semifinals
2	Ifira Black Bird	3	2	0	1	5	5	0	6	Qualification to Semifinals
3	Yatel	3	1	0	2	2	10	−8	3	
4	Mauwia	3	0	0	3	1	10	−9	0	

Updated to match(es) played on 25 August 2019. Source:

Home \ Away	GAL	YAT	IFI	MAU
ABM Galaxy	—	7–0	4–0	6–0
Yatel	-	—	0–3	2–0
Ifira Black Bird	-	-	—	2–1
Mauwia	-	-	-	—

Updated to match(es) played on 25 August 2019. Source:
Legend: Blue = home team win; Yellow = draw; Red = away team win.
For upcoming matches, an "a" indicates there is an article about the rivalry between the two participants.

==== Group B ====
Pos	Team	Pld	W	D	L	GF	GA	GD	Pts	Qualification or relegation
1	Tafea	3	3	0	0	7	3	+4	9	Qualification to Semifinals
2	Tupuji Imere	3	2	0	1	10	4	+6	6	Qualification to Semifinals
3	Erakor Golden Star	3	1	0	2	2	4	−2	3	
4	Sia-Raga	3	0	0	3	0	8	−8	0	

Updated to match(es) played on 25 August 2019. Source:

Home \ Away	TAF	TUP	EGS	SIA
Tafea	—	4–3	2–0	1–0
Tupuji Imere	-	—	2–0	5–0
Erakor Golden Star	-	-	—	2–0
Sia-Raga	-	-	-	—

Updated to match(es) played on 25 August 2019. Source:
Legend: Blue = home team win; Yellow = draw; Red = away team win.
For upcoming matches, an "a" indicates there is an article about the rivalry between the two participants.

=== Semi-final ===
31 August 2019

Galaxy	1-0	Tupuji Imere
Bong Kalo

Korman Stadium, Port Vila
31 August 2019

Tafea	2-0	Ifira Black Bird
Junior Felix; Malakai Tommy

Korman Stadium, Port Vila

=== Third-place match ===
7 September 2019

Ifira Black Bird	1-0	Tupuji Imere
Olsen

Korman Stadium, Port Vila

=== Final ===
7 September 2019
14:00

Tafea	1-0	Galaxy
Jordy Tasip 83'

Korman Stadium, Port Vila

== First Division Opening Cup ==
The eight teams in the cup are the teams that will play the 2019-20 Port Vila First Division

=== Teams ===
- Shepherds United
- Mauriki
- United Malampa
- Easton
- AS Ambassadors
- North Efate United
- Pango Green Bird
- Seveners United

=== Final ===
The final was played on 10 September in Korman Stadium

10 September 2019

Seveners United	6-5	North Efate United
	Report

Korman Stadium, Port Vila

== Second Division Opening Cup ==
The eight teams in the cup are the teams that will play the 2019-20 Port Vila Second Division

=== Teams ===
- Kings United
- Van Warriors
- Melakel
- Black Diamond
- Narak Tegapu
- Redal
- Teouma Academy
- Varona

==== Group B ====
Black Diamond
Kings United
Narak Tegapu
Varona

=== Final ===
7 September 2019

Narak Tegapu	1-0	Redal
	Report

Korman Stadium, Port Vila

The final was played on 7 September 2019 at Korman Stadium. Narak Tegapu has beaten Redal in the final match.

== See also ==
- Port Vila Shield
- Port Vila Independence Cup
- VFF National Super League
- Sport in Vanuatu
