= 2016 PVFA Cup =

Tournament details
- Country: Vanuatu
- Dates: t/m 21 May 2016
- Teams: 27

Final positions
- Champions: Tupuji Imere
- Runner-up: Erakor Golden Star

Tournament statistics
- Top goal scorer(s): Tony Kaltack (14 goals)

Before the 2016 season, the PVFA Cup will be hosted as an opening cup at Port Vila Municipal Stadium.

== Teams ==
TVL Premier League	TVL First Division	TVL Second Division
Level on pyramid – 1	Level on pyramid – 2	Level on pyramid – 3
Amicale FC; Erakor Golden Star; Ifira Black Bird; Mauriki; Shepherds United; Sia-Raga; Spirit 08; Tafea FC; Tupuji Imere	ABM Galaxy; AS Ambassador; Kings United; Mauwia; Narak Tegapu; North Efate United; Seveners United; Yatel FC	Black Diamond; Easton; Lakotau; Lopatu; Malampa United; Pango Green Bird; Redal; Torba United; Varona

All teams and leagues are as off the 2014–15 season.

== Matches ==
The 26 teams participating were split into 4 groups, with the top 2 from each group advancing to the quarter-finals, and the winners of the two semi-finals facing off in the grand final.

=== Group stage ===
==== Group A ====
Team	Pld	W	D	L	GF	GA	GD	Pts
Amicale	3	3	0	0	11	1	+10	9
Tafea	3	3	0	0	8	2	+6	9
ABM Galaxy	3	1	1	1	6	6	0	4
Mauriki	3	1	0	2	3	8	−5	3
Shepherds United	3	0	1	2	4	8	−4	1
Sia-Raga	3	0	0	3	1	8	−7	0

==== Group B ====
Team	Pld	W	D	L	GF	GA	GD	Pts
Erakor Golden Star	2	2	0	0	19	2	+17	6
Tupuji Imere	2	2	0	0	7	2	+5	6
Spirit 08	2	2	0	0	4	0	+4	6
Ifira Black Bird	2	1	0	1	7	2	+5	3
Redal	3	1	0	2	3	15	−12	3
Lakotau	2	0	0	2	6	4	+2	0
North Efate United	3	0	0	3	4	19	−15	0

==== Group C ====
Team	Pld	W	D	L	GF	GA	GD	Pts
Mauwia	3	3	0	0	11	4	+7	9
Yatel	2	2	0	0	6	0	+6	6
Varona	3	1	0	2	3	6	−3	3
Seveners United	2	1	0	1	3	6	−3	3
Narak Tegapu	0	0	0	0	0	0	0	0
Torba United	2	0	0	2	3	6	−3	0
Pango Green Birds	2	0	0	2	1	6	−5	0

==== Group D ====
Team	Pld	W	D	L	GF	GA	GD	Pts
Black Diamond	2	2	0	0	4	0	+4	6
AS Ambassador	2	1	1	0	3	1	+2	4
Lopatu	2	1	0	1	2	3	−1	3
Malampa United	2	0	2	0	2	2	0	2
Kings	2	0	1	1	2	4	−2	1
Eastern Stars	2	0	0	2	2	5	−3	0

== Awards ==
Most improved team	Player of the tournament	Best goalkeeper	Top scorer	Best Coach	Best player of the final
Mauwia	Bong Kalo	Amaniki Telkon	Tony Kaltack (14 goals)	David Chillia	Michel Coulon
