= 2019–20 Port Vila Premier League =

26th season of the Port Villa Premier League

Port Vila Premier League
- Season: 2019–20
- Matches played: 20
- Goals scored: 71 (3.55 per match)
- Top goalscorer: Kensi Tangis (21 goals)

The 2019–20 Port Vila Premier League is the 26th season of the Port Vila Premier League, the top football league in Port Vila, the capital of Vanuatu. The season was previously scheduled to begin in 20 September but it was postponed to 12 October due to 2019 OFC Men's Olympic Qualifying Tournament that was held in Fiji between 21 September and 5 October. Tafea are the defending champions. All clubs play home games at the 6,500-capacity Port Vila Municipal Stadium, except for Yatel FC. They play at the 5,000-capacity Korman Stadium.

== Teams ==
A total of eight teams compete in the league. Shepherds United were relegated from last season. Amicale finished their football activities and were removed from the league. They were replaced by promoted teams Sia-Raga and Mauwia.

Team	Location	Stadium	Capacity
Erakor Golden Star	Port Vila	Port Vila Municipal Stadium	6,500
Galaxy	Port Vila	Port Vila Municipal Stadium	6,500
Ifira Black Bird	Port Vila	Port Vila Municipal Stadium	6,500
Mauwia	Port Vila	Port Vila Municipal Stadium	6,500
Sia-Raga	Port Vila	Port Vila Municipal Stadium	6,500
Tafea	Port Vila	Port Vila Municipal Stadium	6,500
Tupuji Imere	Port Vila	Port Vila Municipal Stadium	6,500
Yatel	Port Vila	Korman Stadium	5,000

== League table ==
Pos	Team	Pld	W	D	L	GF	GA	GD	Pts	Qualification or relegation
1	Ifira Black Bird	14	9	3	2	21	4	+17	30	Qualification to PVFA Top Four Super League
2	Galaxy	14	8	3	3	46	8	+38	27	Qualification to PVFA Top Four Super League
3	Tafea	14	7	4	3	21	11	+10	25	Qualification to PVFA Top Four Super League
4	Erakor Golden Star	14	4	7	3	15	15	0	19	Qualification to PVFA Top Four Super League
5	Tupuji Imere	14	4	2	8	15	29	−14	14	
6	Mauwia	14	4	2	8	11	30	−19	14	
7	Yatel	14	3	5	6	12	32	−20	14	Qualification to Relegation playoff
8	Sia-Raga	14	2	4	8	13	25	−12	10	Relegation to Port Vila First Division

Source: PVFA, RSSSF,

== Results ==
1st Round - 12 October 2019

Galaxy FC 14-0 Yatel
Erakor Golden Star 3-0 Tupuji Imere (WO)
Tafea 2-0 Sia-Raga
Ifira Black Bird 2-0 Mauwia

2nd Round - 18 and 19 October 2019

Galaxy 10-0 Mauwia
Tupuji Imere 0-4 Sia-Raga
Tafea 3-1 Yatel
Ifira Black Bird 0-0 Erakor Golden Star

3rd Round - 25 and 26 October 2019

Tafea 3-1 Mauwia
Tupuji Imere 0-0 Yatel
Ifira Black Bird 2-0 Sia Raga
Galaxy 2-2 Erakor Golden Star

4th Round - 01 and 02 November 2019

Yatel 1-1 Ifira Black Bird
Sia-Raga 1-0 Galaxy
Tupuji Imere 6-1 Mauwia
Tafea 1-1 Erakor Golden Star

5h Round - 08 and 09 November 2019

Sia-Raga 1-1 Yatel
Ifira Black Bird 4-0 Tupuji Imere
Erakor Golden Star 2-0 Mauwia
Galaxy 0-0 Tafea

== Statistics ==
=== Top scorers ===
Rank	Player	Club	Goals
1	(Vanuatu) Kensi Tangis	Galaxy	21
2	(Solomon Islands) James Naka	Galaxy	5
2	(Brazil) Roberson	Galaxy	5
4	(Vanuatu) Jordy Tasip	Tafea	3

=== Multiple hat-tricks ===
Player	For	Against	Score	Date
(Vanuatu) Kensi Tangis^{4}	Galaxy	Yatel	14-0	12 October 2019
(Solomon Islands) James Naka	Galaxy	Yatel	14-0	12 October 2019

== See also ==
- 2019 VFF National Super League
- 2020 VFF National Super League
- 2019 Independence Cup
- 2019 PVFA Cup
