= 2016 Port Vila Premier League =

2016 TVL Premier League
- Season: 2016

The 2016 Port Vila Premier League or 2016 TVL Premier League is the 22nd edition of the Port Vila Premier League, the highest tier of the Port Vila Football League

The top four of the league qualify for the 2016 PVFA Top Four Super League and the two lowest team relegate to the 2017 TVL First Division while the number seven plays a play-off duel against the number two of the 2016 TVL First Division.

Mauriki and Sia-Raga qualified for the league. Mauriki as champions of the 2014–15 TVL First Division while Sia-Raga became second, which means that the league has extended to 9 teams instead of 8.

Before the season, the 2016 PVFA Cup will be held as an opening tournament for all the teams in the 3 highest divisions.

== Teams ==
- Amicale
- Erakor Golden Star
- Ifira Black Bird
- Mauriki
- Shepherds United
- Sia-Raga
- Spirit 08
- Tafea
- Tupuji Imere

== Standings ==
Pos	Team	Pld	W	D	L	GF	GA	GD	Pts	Qualification or relegation
1	Erakor Golden Star	16	12	4	0	45	9	+36	40	Qualified for the 2016 PVFA Top Four Super League
2	Amicale	16	9	6	1	39	13	+26	33	Qualified for the 2016 PVFA Top Four Super League
3	Tafea	16	9	4	3	26	14	+12	31	Qualified for the 2016 PVFA Top Four Super League
4	Ifira Black Bird	16	8	4	4	23	19	+4	28	Qualified for the 2016 PVFA Top Four Super League
5	Tupuji Imere	16	8	3	5	40	23	+17	27	
6	Sia-Raga	16	3	5	8	21	29	−8	14	
7	Mauriki	16	3	5	8	15	41	−26	14	Advances to the Relegation Playoff
8	Spirit 08 (R)	16	3	0	13	14	46	−32	9	Relegated to the 2017 TVL First Division
9	Shepherds United (R)	16	1	2	13	21	49	−28	5	Relegated to the 2017 TVL First Division

Updated to match(es) played on 25 November 2016. Source:
Rules for classification: 1) points; 2) goal difference; 3) number of goals scored.
(R) Relegated

== PVFA Top Four Super League ==
In the 2016 PVFA Top Four Super League, the four teams play each other on a round-robin basis. The winner will join Malampa Revivors in the 2017 OFC Champions League

Matches will take place between 3–17 December 2016. All times are local, VAN (UTC+11).

Pos	Team	Pld	W	D	L	GF	GA	GD	Pts	Qualification
1	Erakor Golden Star	3	1	2	0	5	1	+4	5	2017 OFC Champions League
2	Amicale	3	1	2	0	3	2	+1	5	
3	Tafea	3	0	2	1	3	4	−1	2	
4	Ifira Black Bird	3	0	2	1	0	4	−4	2	

Updated to match(es) played on 17 December 2016. Source: Vanuafoot
3 December 2016
13:00

Erakor Golden Star	0-0	Amicale
	Report

Port Vila Municipal Stadium, Port Vila
Referee: (New Caledonia) Médéric Lacour
3 December 2016
15:00

Tafea	0-0	Ifira Black Bird
	Report

Port Vila Municipal Stadium, Port Vila
Referee: (Vanuatu) George Bruce

10 December 2016
13:00

Erakor Golden Star	1-1	Tafea
Brian Kaltack	Report	Bong Kalo

Port Vila Municipal Stadium, Port Vila
10 December 2016
15:00

Amicale	0-0	Ifira Black Bird
	Report

Port Vila Municipal Stadium, Port Vila

17 December 2016
13:00

Amicale	3-2	Tafea
Pepeta 30'; Kensi Tangis 58', 75'		Jaycen Botleng 53', 86'

Port Vila Municipal Stadium, Port Vila
17 December 2016
15:00

Ifira Black Bird	0-4	Erakor Golden Star
		Bernard Daniel 15'; Jacky Ruben 30'; Tony Kaltack 65', 80'

Port Vila Municipal Stadium, Port Vila

== Relegation playoff ==
The Port Vila Football Association, the PVFA decided that next season the league will go to 8 teams instead of 9. The two lowest teams automatically relegated and the number seven of the competition, Mauriki, was forced to play a Play-off against the number two of the 2016 Port Vila First Division, Seveners United. Mauriki won the match, which means that they will remain in the Port Vila Premier League for the 2017 season.

1 December 2016
15:00

Mauriki	2–1	Seveners United
	Report

Port Vila Stadium, Port Vila
Attendance: 5000
Referee: Nawen Hopkins
