= List of football clubs in Vanuatu =

This is a list of association football clubs in Vanuatu.

== Football clubs ==
- ABM Galaxy
- Amicale F.C.
- AS Ambassadors
- Black Diamond
- Easton
- Erakor Golden Star
- Ifira Black Bird F.C.
- Kings United
- M3 United
- Malampa Revivors F.C.
- Mauriki
- Mauwia
- Melakel
- Narak Tegapu
- North Efate United
- Pango Green Bird F.C.
- Redal
- Rue Rue F.C.
- Seveners United
- Shepherds United*
- Sia-Raga
- Spirit 08 F.C.
- Tafea F.C.
- Teouma Academy
- Torba United
- Tupuji Imere F.C.
- United Malampa
- Van Warriors
- Varona
- Westtan Verts F.C.
- Yatel F.C.
