= Port Vila FA Cup =

Football League

The Port Vila FA Cup or the PVFA Cup, is a cup tournament in the country of Vanuatu, held for football clubs competing in the Port Vila Football League. It is run and overseen by the Port Vila Football Association.

It was originally held as a pre-season competition for the 8 clubs that play in the Digicel Premier League. As of 2016, the PVFA Cup became a tournament across the 3 divisions.

== Premier League Cup 2019 ==
=== Group A ===
Pos	Team	Pld	W	D	L	GF	GA	GD	Pts	Qualification or relegation
1	ABM Galaxy	3	3	0	0	17	0	+17	9	Qualification to Semifinals
2	Ifira Black Bird	3	2	0	1	5	5	0	6	Qualification to Semifinals
3	Yatel	3	1	0	2	2	10	−8	3	
4	Mauwia	3	0	0	3	1	10	−9	0	

Updated to match(es) played on 25 August 2019. Source:

Home \ Away	GAL	YAT	IFI	MAU
ABM Galaxy	—	7–0	4–0	6–0
Yatel	-	—	0–3	2–0
Ifira Black Bird	-	-	—	2–1
Mauwia	-	-	-	—

Updated to match(es) played on 25 August 2019. Source:
Legend: Blue = home team win; Yellow = draw; Red = away team win.
For upcoming matches, an "a" indicates there is an article about the rivalry between the two participants.

=== Group B ===
Pos	Team	Pld	W	D	L	GF	GA	GD	Pts	Qualification or relegation
1	Tafea	3	3	0	0	7	3	+4	9	Qualification to Semifinals
2	Tupuji Imere	3	2	0	1	10	4	+6	6	Qualification to Semifinals
3	Erakor Golden Star	3	1	0	2	2	4	−2	3	
4	Sia-Raga	3	0	0	3	0	8	−8	0	

Updated to match(es) played on 25 August 2019. Source:

Home \ Away	TAF	TUP	EGS	SIA
Tafea	—	4–3	2–0	1–0
Tupuji Imere	-	—	2–0	5–0
Erakor Golden Star	-	-	—	2–0
Sia-Raga	-	-	-	—

Updated to match(es) played on 25 August 2019. Source:
Legend: Blue = home team win; Yellow = draw; Red = away team win.
For upcoming matches, an "a" indicates there is an article about the rivalry between the two participants.

=== Semi-finals ===
31 August 2019

Galaxy	1-0	Tupuji Imere
Bong Kalo

Korman Stadium, Port Vila
31 August 2019

Tafea	2-0	Ifira Black Bird
Junior Felix; Malakai Tommy

Korman Stadium, Port Vila

=== Final ===
7 September 2019

Tafea	1-0	Galaxy
Jordy Tasip

Korman Stadium, Port Vila

== Winners ==
- 2014 - Tafea 3-0 Ifira Black Bird
- 2016 - Tupuji Imere 1-0 Erakor Golden Star
- 2018 - Amicale 4-1 Galaxy

== See also ==
- Port Vila Shield
- VFF National Super League
- Sport in Vanuatu
