= 2014 Port Vila Shield =

Tournament details
- Host country: Vanuatu
- City: Port Vila
- Dates: January 13–25, 2014
- Teams: 8
- Venue(s): 1 (in 1 host city)

Final positions
- Champions: Tafea F.C.
- Runners-up: Amicale F.C.
- Third place: Erakor Golden Star
- Fourth place: Tupuji Imere F.C.

Tournament statistics
- Matches played: 8
- Goals scored: 29 (3.63 per match)

The 2014 Port Vila Shield was the 2nd edition of the Port Vila Shield, which placed the teams from the 2013-14 TVL Premier League against each other in a cup format. This cup acts a sort of warm-up for the second part of the league in the following months. The competition was held at the Port Vila Municipal Stadium.

== Teams ==
- Amicale F.C.
- Erakor Golden Star
- Ifira Black Bird F.C.
- Shepherds United
- Spirit 08 F.C.
- Tafea F.C.
- Tupuji Imere F.C.
- Yatel F.C.

== Playoffs ==
=== Quarter-finals ===
January 13, 2014	Amicale F.C.	4–0	Spirit 08 F.C.	Port Vila Municipal Stadium
	Octav Meltecoin 47'; Sanni Issa 70, 82' Esava Naqelaca 72'

January 13, 2014	Erakor Golden Star	5–1	Shepherds United	Port Vila Municipal Stadium
	Samuel Kaloros 38'; Jack Niko 60'; Tony Kaltack 72, 74'; Abtul Roquara 83'		Danny Michel 69'

January 13, 2014	Tafea F.C.	2–1	Yatel F.C.	Port Vila Municipal Stadium
	Sika Mahuni 65'; Joseph Namariau 75'		Colen Makito

January 13, 2014	Tupuji Imere F.C.	3–0	Ifira Black Bird F.C.	Port Vila Municipal Stadium
	Raul Coulon 35'; Malon Kaltanak 52'; Rodney Serveux

=== Semi-finals ===
January 18, 2014	Amicale F.C.	2–1	Tupuji Imere F.C.	Port Vila Municipal Stadium
	Francois Sakama 30'; Sanni Issa 75'		Maxim Malas 71'

January 18, 2014	Tafea F.C.	1–0	Erakor Golden Star	Port Vila Municipal Stadium
	Nichol Tari 25'

=== Third-Place Match ===
January 25, 2015	Erakor Golden Star	4–4 (4–2 pen.)	Tupuji Imere F.C.	Port Vila Municipal Stadium

=== Final ===
January 25, 2015	Tafea F.C.	1–0	Amicale F.C.	Port Vila Municipal Stadium
	Nichol Tari 45'
