= 2017 Port Vila Premier League =

2017 TVL Premier League
- Season: 2017
- Champions: Ifira Black Bird

The 2017 Port Vila Premier League or 2017 TVL Premier League is the 23rd edition of the Port Vila Premier League, the highest tier of the Port Vila Football League.

Many league games took place in front of hundreds of spectators.

== Standings ==
Pos	Team	Pld	W	D	L	GF	GA	GD	Pts	Qualification or relegation
1	Ifira Black Bird (C)	14	9	4	1	27	11	+16	31	Qualification to PVFA Top Four Super League
2	Erakor Golden Star	14	8	6	0	30	12	+18	30	Qualification to PVFA Top Four Super League
3	Tupuji Imere	14	7	4	3	25	20	+5	25	Qualification to PVFA Top Four Super League
4	Amicale	14	6	5	3	22	21	+1	23	Qualification to PVFA Top Four Super League
5	Tafea	14	3	5	6	20	17	+3	14	
6	Mauwia	14	3	5	6	14	19	−5	14	
7	Sia-Raga	14	2	3	9	14	32	−18	9	
8	Mauriki	14	2	0	12	12	32	−20	6	Relegation to Port Vila First Division

Source: FIFA
(C) Champions

== PVFA Top Four Super League ==
=== Grand Final Qualifier ===
10 June 2017

Ifira Black Bird	0–0	Erakor Golden Star
Penalties
	3–0

=== Semifinal Qualifier ===
10 June 2017

Tupuji Imere	1–3	Amicale

=== Semifinal ===
1 July 2017

Erakor Golden Star	1–0	Amicale

=== Grand Final ===
Winner of the grand final qualified for the 2018 OFC Champions League and the 2017 VFF National Super League grand final.

8 July 2017

Ifira Black Bird	0–2	Erakor Golden Star
