= 2019 Independence Cup =

2019 Port Vila Independence Cup
Tournament details
- Country: Vanuatu
- Dates: 21 July – 30 July
- Teams: 8

Final positions
- Champions: Tupuji Imere
- Runners-up: Tafea

Tournament statistics
- Matches played: 7
- Goals scored: 24 (3.43 per match)

The Port Vila Independence Cup is a cup held in Port Vila in July. The final match is played on July 30, Vanuatu's independence day. The cup is played by eight teams that played the previous Port Vila Premier League season. Subsequently, the 2019 cup was played by the teams that participated in the 2018-19 Port Vila Premier League.

== Teams ==
The 2019 Port Vila Independence Cup was played by the eight teams that played 2018–19 Port Vila Premier League. It was the last official tournament of Amicale, due to the team ending its football activities.

- Amicale
- Erakor Golden Star
- Galaxy
- Ifira Black Bird
- Shepherds United
- Tafea
- Tupuji Imere
- Yatel

== Quarter-finals ==
21 July 2019	Galaxy	4-0	Shepherds United

21 July 2019	Tupuji Imere	3-2	Erakor Golden Star

21 July 2019	Tafea	4-3	Yatel

21 July 2019	Ifira Black Bird	1-0	Amicale

== Semi-finals ==
27 July 2019	Galaxy	0-1	Tupuji Imere

27 July 2019	Tafea	2-0	Ifira Black Bird

== Final ==
30 July 2019	Tupuji Imere	3-1	Tafea
