= 2018–19 Port Vila Premier League =

Port Vila Premier League
- Season: 2018–19
- Champions: Tafea
- Relegated: Amicale (disbanded); Shepherds United
- OFC Champions League: Galaxy

The 2018–19 Port Vila Premier League is the 25th season of the Port Vila Premier League, the top football league in Port Vila, the capital of Vanuatu. The season started on 27 October 2018. Tupuji Imere were the defending champions.

Tafea FC won a record 16th league title, their first league title since 2008–09, the last of their world record 15 titles in a row.

== Teams ==
A total of eight teams compete in the league. Sia-Raga and Mauwia were relegated from last season, and were replaced by promoted teams Galaxy and Yatel.

- Amicale
- Erakor Golden Star
- Galaxy
- Ifira Black Bird
- Shepherds United
- Tafea
- Tupuji Imere
- Yatel

== League table ==
Pos	Team	Pld	W	D	L	GF	GA	GD	Pts	Qualification or relegation
1	Tafea (C)	14	9	3	2	39	11	+28	30	Qualification to PVFA Top Four Super League
2	Galaxy	14	8	3	3	33	16	+17	27	Qualification to PVFA Top Four Super League
3	Erakor Golden Star	14	7	4	3	25	17	+8	25	Qualification to PVFA Top Four Super League
4	Amicale (Note: Disbanded for next season)	14	7	4	3	36	24	+12	25	Qualification to PVFA Top Four Super League
5	Ifira Black Bird	14	5	5	4	17	22	−5	19 (Note: Ifira Black Bird deducted 1 point for using ineligible players.)	
6	Tupuji Imere	14	3	3	8	18	34	−16	12	
7	Shepherds United (R)	14	1	5	8	18	32	−14	8	Relegation to Port Vila First Division
8	Yatel	14	1	3	10	18	48	−30	6	

Source: PVFA
(C) Champions; (R) Relegated

== Results ==
Home \ Away	IFI	TAF	GAL	EGS	AMI	TUP	SHE	YAT
Ifira Black Bird	—	0–3*		1–0		3–1	1–0	2–0
Tafea	0–0	—	3–2	5–0	2–2	4–1	3–1	4–1
Galaxy	2–0	2–1	—		4–1	5–0		6–0
Erakor Golden Star	1–1		1–0	—	2–1	0–0	1–1	
Amicale	3–3		1–3		—	2–1	4–1	3–1
Tupuji Imere		0–1		0–6		—	3–2	4–1
Shepherds United			1–1	0–5	2–3		—	
Yatel	1–3		2–2	1–3		2–2	2–2	—

Updated to match(es) played on 20 January 2019. Source:
Legend: Blue = home team win; Yellow = draw; Red = away team win.
For upcoming matches, an "a" indicates there is an article about the rivalry between the two participants.
- - Ifira Black Bird won the match (1-0) but three points were given to Tafea because Ifira Black Bird fielded ineligible players.

== PVFA Top Four Super League ==
The top four teams of the Port Vila Premier League play in the Top Four Super League for a place in the OFC Champions League.

=== Grand Final Qualifier ===
22 April 2019
13:00

Tafea	awarded to Tafea originally 0–2	Galaxy

Port Vila Municipal Stadium

=== Semifinal Qualifier ===
22 April 2019
15:00

Erakor Golden Star	1–2	Amicale

Port Vila Municipal Stadium

=== Semifinal ===
27 April 2019
14:00

Galaxy	5–1	Amicale

Port Vila Municipal Stadium

=== Grand Final ===
Winner of the Grand Final qualifies for the 2020 OFC Champions League group stage and the 2019 VFF National Super League grand final.

1 May 2019
14:00

Tafea	1–2	Galaxy

Port Vila Municipal Stadium

== See also ==
- 2019 VFF National Super League
