= 2012 OFC Men's Olympic Qualifying Football Tournament squads =

== Group A ==
=== American Samoa ===
Head coach: Rupeni Luvu

No.	Pos.	Player	Date of birth (age)	Caps	Goals	Club
1	GK	Satila Tupua	18 December 1993 (aged 18)	3	0	Unattached
2	DF	Liatama Amisone Jr.	2 March 1989 (aged 23)	3	0	(Football Federation American Samoa) Pago Youth
3	DF	Tala Luvu	2 September 1990 (aged 21)	3	0	(Football Federation American Samoa) Lion Hearts FC
4	DF	Daru Taumua	1 November 1991 (aged 20)	3	0	(Football Federation American Samoa) Pago Youth
5	MF	Meafou Kaleopa	15 August 1993 (aged 18)	0	0	Unattached
6	FW	Suani Uelese	30 May 1991 (aged 20)	3	0	Unattached
7	DF	Shalom Luani	5 August 1994 (aged 17)	3	1	(United States Soccer Federation) Chabot College
8	MF	Kid Bartley	22 February 1994 (aged 18)	3	0	Unattached
9	MF	Moe Kuresa	7 January 1991 (aged 21)	3	0	(Football Federation American Samoa) Pago Youth
10	FW	Ailao Tualaulelei Jr.	23 December 1991 (aged 20)	3	1	(Football Federation American Samoa) Pago Youth
11	MF	Misi Tuitamai	16 August 1994 (aged 17)	0	0	(Football Federation American Samoa) Pago Youth
12	DF	Andrew Maloa	31 May 1992 (aged 19)	3	0	Unattached
14	MF	Henry Lameta	27 August 1996 (aged 15)	0	0	(Football Federation American Samoa) Pago Youth
15	FW	Ryan Petaia	24 January 1994 (aged 18)	1	0	Unattached
16	FW	Roy Luani	1 June 1993 (aged 18)	3	0	Unattached
17	MF	Aliva Afele	13 November 1990 (aged 21)	1	0	Unattached
18	FW	Mike Unasa	3 May 1992 (aged 19)	2	0	Unattached
19	DF	Michael Taumua	11 July 1995 (aged 16)	1	0	Unattached
20	DF	Tafa Ioapo	29 December 1989 (aged 22)	3	0	Unattached
23	GK	Tevita Taliaoli	21 August 1993 (aged 18)	1	0	Unattached

=== Fiji ===
Head coach: Imdad Ali

No.	Pos.	Player	Date of birth (age)	Caps	Goals	Club
1	GK	Akuila Mateisuva	January 15, 1992 (aged 20)	5	0	(Fiji Football Association) Labasa
2	DF	Remueru Tekiate	August 7, 1990 (aged 21)	5	0	(Fiji Football Association) Ba
3	DF	Peniame Drova	October 15, 1990 (aged 21)	0	0	(Fiji Football Association) Rewa
4	MF	Esava Naqeleca	January 4, 1989 (aged 23)	5	6	(Fiji Football Association) Suva
5	DF	Archie Watkins	September 15, 1989 (aged 22)	5	2	(Fiji Football Association) Suva
6	DF	Luke Rawadamu	March 8, 1990 (aged 22)	0	0	(Fiji Football Association) Nadroga
7	MF	Ilisoni Tuinawaivuvu	January 8, 1991 (aged 21)	3	0	(Fiji Football Association) Rewa
8	MF	Amani Valebalavu	February 20, 1991 (aged 21)	2	0	(Fiji Football Association) Labasa
9	DF	Kavaia Rawaqa	September 20, 1990 (aged 21)	0	0	(Fiji Football Association) Lautoka
10	MF	Zibraaz Sahib	September 9, 1989 (aged 22)	5	2	(Fiji Football Association) Lautoka
11	MF	Jone Kaloutani	December 2, 1989 (aged 22)	0	0	(Fiji Football Association) Rewa
12	MF	Laisenia Naioko	October 14, 1990 (aged 21)	5	0	(Fiji Football Association) Ba
13	MF	Poasa Bainivalu	November 18, 1992 (aged 19)	0	0	(Fiji Football Association) Lautoka
14	FW	Jone Salauneune	August 8, 1993 (aged 18)	5	1	(Fiji Football Association) Nadi
15	MF	Misaele Draunibaka	April 6, 1992 (aged 19)	5	2	(Fiji Football Association) Rewa
16	FW	Abbu Zahid Shaheed	February 14, 1991 (aged 21)	4	0	(New Zealand Football) Waitakere United
17	DF	Ilimotama Jese	March 16, 1990 (aged 22)	0	0	(Fiji Football Association) Nadi
18	FW	Samuela Drudru	April 30, 1989 (aged 22)	0	0	(Fiji Football Association) Nadi
19	DF	Krishneel Dutt	March 29, 1989 (aged 22)	0	0	(Fiji Football Association) Nadroga
20	GK	Ravinesh Singh	March 10, 1989 (aged 23)	0	0	(Fiji Football Association) Tavua
23	DF	Muni Goundar	June 30, 1992 (aged 19)	1	0	Unattached

=== Solomon Islands ===
Head coach: Luke Eroi

No.	Pos.	Player	Date of birth (age)	Caps	Goals	Club
1	GK	Samson Koti	11 December 1991 (aged 20)	0	0	(Solomon Islands Football Federation) Solomon Warriors
2	FW	Johan Doiwale	7 February 1990 (aged 22)	2	1	(Solomon Islands Football Federation) Real Kakamora
3	DF	Freddie Kini	27 November 1992 (aged 19)	3	0	(Solomon Islands Football Federation) Western United
4	DF	Chris Tafoa	18 December 1992 (aged 19)	3	1	(Solomon Islands Football Federation) Kossa
5	DF	Israel Kote Fanai (c)	7 April 1992 (aged 19)	1	0	(Solomon Islands Football Federation) Koloale FC Honiara
6	DF	Michael Boso	3 September 1991 (aged 20)	2	0	(Solomon Islands Football Federation) Western United
7	MF	James Egeta	10 August 1990 (aged 21)	1	0	(Solomon Islands Football Federation) Malaita Kingz
8	MF	Jeffrey Bule	15 November 1991 (aged 20)	3	0	(Solomon Islands Football Federation) Western United
9	MF	Moffat Kilifa	17 January 1989 (aged 23)	3	0	(Vanuatu Football Federation) Ifira Black Bird
10	FW	Tutizama Tanito	27 November 1993 (aged 18)	2	0	(Papua New Guinea Football Association) Hekari United
11	FW	Ian Paia	20 October 1990 (aged 21)	3	7	(Solomon Islands Football Federation) Koloale FC Honiara
12	MF	Jerry Donga	31 January 1991 (aged 21)	3	1	(Solomon Islands Football Federation) Solomon Warriors
13	MF	Mollis Gagame	21 September 1989 (aged 22)	1	0	(Solomon Islands Football Federation) Western United
14	FW	Karol Kakate	2 November 1992 (aged 19)	2	2	(Solomon Islands Football Federation) Western United
15	DF	Francis Lafai	21 October 1990 (aged 21)	1	0	(Solomon Islands Football Federation) Koloale FC Honiara
16	DF	Emmanuel Poila	16 July 1990 (aged 21)	3	0	(Papua New Guinea Football Association) Hekari United
17	MF	Coleman Makau	25 November 1992 (aged 19)	2	0	(Solomon Islands Football Federation) Malaita Kingz
18	MF	Himson Teleda	28 August 1992 (aged 19)	1	1	(Solomon Islands Football Federation) Western United
19	FW	Micah Lea'alafa	1 June 1991 (aged 20)	3	3	(Vanuatu Football Federation) Amicale
20	GK	Silas Seda	8 September 1992 (aged 19)	3	0	(Solomon Islands Football Federation) Solomon Warriors

=== Vanuatu ===
Head coach: Richard Iwai

No.	Pos.	Player	Date of birth (age)	Caps	Goals	Club
1	GK	Seiloni Iaruel	17 April 1995 (aged 16)	4	0	(Vanuatu Football Federation) Tafea
2	DF	Dominique Fred	21 October 1992 (aged 19)	5	0	(Vanuatu Football Federation) Amicale
3	DF	Kevin Shem	5 December 1993 (aged 18)	5	0	(Vanuatu Football Federation) Tafea
4	DF	Brian Kaltak	30 September 1993 (aged 18)	5	0	(Vanuatu Football Federation) Erakor Golden Star
5	MF	Ivong Wilson	27 December 1992 (aged 19)	0	0	(Vanuatu Football Federation) Shepherds United
6	DF	Junia Vava	13 September 1993 (aged 18)	0	0	(Vanuatu Football Federation) Shepherds United
7	MF	Roddy Lenga	22 April 1990 (aged 21)	4	2	(Vanuatu Football Federation) Amicale
8	MF	Didier Kalip	4 March 1991 (aged 21)	0	0	(Vanuatu Football Federation) Spirit 08
9	FW	Robert Tasso	18 December 1989 (aged 22)	5	3	(Vanuatu Football Federation) Tafea
10	MF	Eddison Stephen	2 October 1992 (aged 19)	0	0	(Vanuatu Football Federation) Tafea
11	FW	Jean Kaltak	19 August 1994 (aged 17)	5	4	(Vanuatu Football Federation) Erakor Golden Star
12	MF	Barry Mansale	1 November 1995 (aged 16)	3	0	(Papua New Guinea Football Association) Hekari United
13	MF	Octave Meltecoin	15 May 1992 (aged 19)	0	0	(Vanuatu Football Federation) Amicale
14	MF	Silas Namatak	30 January 1990 (aged 22)	4	3	(Vanuatu Football Federation) Amicale
15	FW	Kensi Tangis	20 January 1990 (aged 22)	3	1	(Vanuatu Football Federation) Amicale
16	GK	Simon Tousi	9 March 1992 (aged 20)	1	0	(Vanuatu Football Federation) Siwi
17	DF	Malon Kaltanak	28 January 1991 (aged 21)	2	0	(Vanuatu Football Federation) Tupuji Imere
18	FW	Bernard Daniel	11 August 1992 (aged 19)	0	0	(Vanuatu Football Federation) Spirit 08
19	DF	Willie-Ola Jimmy	29 December 1992 (aged 19)	0	0	(Vanuatu Football Federation) Shepherds United
20	DF	Lucien Hinge	21 March 1992 (aged 19)	4	0	(Vanuatu Football Federation) Tafea

== Group B ==
=== New Zealand ===
Head coach: (England) Neil Emblen

No.	Pos.	Player	Date of birth (age)	Caps	Club
1	GK	Jake Gleeson	26 June 1990 (aged 21)	0	(United States) Portland Timbers
2	DF	Tim Myers	17 September 1990 (aged 21)	0	(New Zealand) Waitakere United
3	DF	Ian Hogg	15 December 1989 (aged 22)	8	(New Zealand) Auckland City FC
4	DF	Michael Eager	18 June 1989 (aged 22)	0	(New Zealand) Team Wellington
5	DF	Anthony Hobbs	6 April 1991 (aged 20)	0	(United States) Florida International University
6	MF	Marco Rojas	5 November 1991 (aged 20)	0	(Australia) Melbourne Victory
7	MF	Cameron Lindsay	21 December 1992 (aged 19)	0	(New Zealand) Wellington Phoenix FC
8	FW	Ethan Galbraith	25 August 1991 (aged 20)	0	(New Zealand) Team Wellington
9	FW	Greg Draper	13 August 1989 (aged 22)	2	(Wales) The New Saints
10	FW	Sean Lovemore	8 June 1992 (aged 19)	0	(New Zealand) Waitakere United
11	FW	Dakota Lucas	26 June 1991 (aged 20)	0	(New Zealand) Team Wellington
12	FW	Louis Fenton	3 April 1993 (aged 18)	0	(New Zealand) Team Wellington
13	MF	Alex Feneridis	13 November 1989 (aged 22)	0	(New Zealand) Auckland City FC
14	DF	James Musa	1 April 1992 (aged 19)	0	(New Zealand) Team Wellington
15	MF	Jason Hicks	16 January 1990 (aged 22)	0	(New Zealand) Waikato FC
16	DF	Tristan Prattley	4 April 1990 (aged 21)	0	(New Zealand) Otago United
17	MF	Adam McGeorge	30 March 1989 (aged 22)	0	(New Zealand) Auckland City FC
18	DF	Adam Thomas	1 April 1992 (aged 19)	0	(New Zealand) Waikato FC
19	MF	Daniel Saric	14 July 1992 (aged 19)	0	Free Agent
20	GK	Michael O'Keefe	9 August 1990 (aged 21)	0	(United States) Fairfield University

=== Papua New Guinea ===
Head coach: (Australia) Frank Farina

No.	Pos.	Player	Date of birth (age)	Caps	Club
1	GK	Joey Kala	19 February 1990 (aged 22)		(Papua New Guinea) Morobe Kumuls FC
2	DF	Peter Yang	28 August 1992 (aged 19)		(Papua New Guinea) Besta PNG United
4	DF	Daniel Joe	29 May 1990 (aged 21)		(Papua New Guinea) Hekari United
5	MF	Max Sengum	31 December 1991 (aged 20)		(Papua New Guinea) Besta PNG United
6	FW	Ronald Sohuru	23 June 1989 (aged 22)		(Papua New Guinea) Petro Souths F.C.
7	MF	Eliud Fugre	15 March 1989 (aged 23)		(Papua New Guinea) Eastern Stars FC
8	FW	Alwin Komolong	2 November 1994 (aged 17)		(New Zealand)
9	MF	Nigel Dabingyaba	26 October 1992 (aged 19)		(Papua New Guinea) Hekari United
10	FW	Jamal Seeto	8 September 1990 (aged 21)		(Papua New Guinea) Besta PNG United
11	FW	Vanya Malagian	10 October 1991 (aged 20)		(Papua New Guinea) Besta PNG United
12	MF	Wilson Gia	12 April 1991 (aged 20)		(Papua New Guinea) Hekari United
13	DF	Roland Bala	18 September 1990 (aged 21)		(Papua New Guinea) Besta PNG United
14	MF	Emmanuel Simon	25 December 1992 (aged 19)		(Papua New Guinea) Besta PNG United
15	MF	Amon Meki	30 June 1989 (aged 22)		(Papua New Guinea) Eastern Stars FC
16	DF	Kila Polena	7 January 1991 (aged 21)		(Papua New Guinea) Morobe Kumuls FC
17	FW	Lap Embel	5 June 1992 (aged 19)		(Papua New Guinea) Eastern Stars FC
18	MF	Wira Wama	24 October 1989 (aged 22)		(Papua New Guinea) Hekari United
19	DF	Lee Wabing	3 April 1991 (aged 20)		(Papua New Guinea) Besta PNG United
20	GK	Ronald Warisan	20 September 1989 (aged 22)		(Papua New Guinea) Besta PNG United
21	DF	Japheth Tiampo	5 June 1991 (aged 20)		(Papua New Guinea) Besta PNG United

=== Tonga ===
Head coach: Timote Moleni

No.	Pos.	Player	Date of birth (age)	Caps	Goals	Club
1	GK	Sione Faupula	7 January 1991 (aged 21)	2	0	(Tonga Football Association) Lotoha'apai United
2	MF	Fineasi Palei	20 May 1989 (aged 22)	2	0	(Tonga Football Association) Lotoha'apai United
4	DF	Christian Likio	28 March 1990 (aged 21)	2	0	(Tonga Football Association) Unattached
5	MF	Oliveti Vai	10 May 1994 (aged 17)	2	0	(Tonga Football Association) Lotoha'apai United
6	FW	Malakai Savieti	11 November 1989 (aged 22)	2	0	Unattached
7	MF	Siosifa Moimoi	30 September 1994 (aged 17)	2	0	(Tonga Football Association) Kolofo’ou FC
8	MF	Timote Maamaaloa	17 June 1989 (aged 22)	2	0	(Tonga Football Association) Lotoha'apai United
9	DF	Sione Langi	7 June 1992 (aged 19)	0	0	Unattached
10	DF	Matana Paongo	9 March 1989 (aged 23)	1	0	(Tonga Football Association) Lotoha'apai United
11	FW	Kinitoni Falatau	14 November 1994 (aged 17)	2	0	(Tonga Football Association) Houmakelikao
12	FW	Siosaia Latupauu	13 November 1993 (aged 18)	2	0	Unattached
13	DF	Samisoni Mafi	20 August 1990 (aged 21)	2	0	(Tonga Football Association) Lotoha'apai United
14	DF	Sevedale Latu	9 November 1990 (aged 21)	1	0	Unattached
15	FW	Hemaloto Polovili	26 July 1997 (aged 14)	1	0	(Tonga Football Association) Lotoha'apai United
16	MF	Misinale Lutu	12 January 1994 (aged 18)	1	0	Unattached
17	DF	Joseph Kapani	9 June 1989 (aged 22)	1	0	Unattached
18	GK	Vei Taufa'ao	27 May 1989 (aged 22)	0	0	Unattached
19	MF	Steven Likio	3 June 1991 (aged 20)	0	0	Unattached
20	DF	Ilaisa Lotaki	12 January 1990 (aged 22)	1	0	Unattached
21	FW	Vaha Maamaaloa	17 June 1989 (aged 22)	1	0	Unattached
22	FW	Valu Kolofale	3 August 1993 (aged 18)	0	0	(Tonga Football Association) Lotoha'apai United
