= 2024 OFC Men's Nations Cup squads =

The 2024 OFC Men's Nations Cup was an international football tournament co-hosted by Fiji and Vanuatu from 15 to 30 June 2024. The seven national teams involved in the tournament were required to submit squads of maximum 23 players – of which three had to be goalkeepers (Regulation 21.1). Only players in these squads were eligible to take part in the tournament.

The age listed for each player is on 15 June 2024, the first day of the tournament. The number of caps listed for each player does not include any matches played after the start of the 2024 OFC Men's Nations Cup.

== Group A ==
=== New Zealand ===
Head coach: (England) Darren Bazeley

New Zealand announced their final squad, containing 21 players rather than the allowed 23, on 5 June 2024.

No.	Pos.	Player	Date of birth (age)	Caps	Goals	Club
1	GK	Max Crocombe	12 August 1993 (aged 30)	6	0	(The Football Association) Burton Albion
2	DF	Tim Payne	10 January 1994 (aged 30)	34	2	(New Zealand Football) Wellington Phoenix
3	DF	Lukas Kelly-Heald	18 March 2005 (aged 19)	0	0	(New Zealand Football) Wellington Phoenix
4	DF	Tyler Bindon	27 January 2005 (aged 19)	6	0	(The Football Association) Reading
5	DF	Finn Surman	3 September 2003 (aged 20)	1	0	(New Zealand Football) Wellington Phoenix
6	MF	Cameron Howieson	22 December 1994 (aged 29)	16	0	(New Zealand Football) Auckland City
7	FW	Kosta Barbarouses	19 February 1990 (aged 34)	52	4	(New Zealand Football) Wellington Phoenix
8	MF	Alex Rufer	12 June 1996 (aged 28)	9	0	(New Zealand Football) Wellington Phoenix
9	FW	Ben Waine	11 June 2001 (aged 23)	13	1	(The Football Association) Plymouth Argyle
11	MF	Elijah Just	1 May 2000 (aged 24)	22	1	(Danish Football Association) Horsens
12	GK	Alex Paulsen	4 July 2002 (aged 21)	0	0	(New Zealand Football) Wellington Phoenix
13	DF	Liberato Cacace (captain)	27 September 2000 (aged 23)	22	1	(Italian Football Federation) Empoli
14	MF	Ben Old	13 August 2002 (aged 21)	4	0	(New Zealand Football) Wellington Phoenix
15	DF	Tommy Smith	31 March 1990 (aged 34)	52	2	(Football Australia) Macarthur FC
16	DF	Sam Sutton	10 December 2001 (aged 22)	0	0	(New Zealand Football) Wellington Phoenix
17	FW	Alex Greive	13 May 1999 (aged 25)	11	2	(Scottish Football Association) Dundee United
18	FW	Oskar van Hattum	14 April 2002 (aged 22)	0	0	(New Zealand Football) Wellington Phoenix
19	FW	Jesse Randall	19 August 2002 (aged 21)	0	0	(New Zealand Football) Wellington Olympic
20	MF	Fin Conchie	10 August 2003 (aged 20)	0	0	(New Zealand Football) Wellington Phoenix
21	FW	Max Mata	10 July 2000 (aged 23)	10	0	(The Football Association) Shrewsbury Town
22	GK	Oliver Sail	13 January 1996 (aged 28)	9	0	(Football Australia) Perth Glory

=== Solomon Islands ===
Solomon Islands announced their final squad on 29 May 2024.

Head coach: Jacob Moli

No.	Pos.	Player	Date of birth (age)	Caps	Goals	Club
1	GK	Philip Mango	28 August 1995 (aged 28)	37	0	(Solomon Islands Football Federation) Central Coast
2	DF	Allen Peter	11 September 1995 (aged 28)	16	0	(Solomon Islands Football Federation) Solomon Warriors
3	DF	Leon Kofana	22 June 2002 (aged 21)	14	0	(Fiji Football Association) Rewa
4	DF	Junior David	22 September 2001 (aged 22)	4	0	(Solomon Islands Football Federation) Central Coast
5	DF	Javin Wae	17 November 2002 (aged 21)	15	0	(Solomon Islands Football Federation) Central Coast
6	MF	Hudson Oreinima	24 July 1988 (aged 35)	0	0	(Solomon Islands Football Federation) Central Coast
7	FW	Junior Fordney	26 November 1999 (aged 24)	1	0	(Solomon Islands Football Federation) Central Coast
8	MF	Tigi Molea	24 September 1992 (aged 31)	6	3	(Solomon Islands Football Federation) Solomon Warriors
9	FW	John Orobulu	29 August 2000 (aged 23)	7	8	(Solomon Islands Football Federation) Henderson Eels
10	FW	Raphael Lea'i	9 September 2003 (aged 20)	17	11	(Football Association of Bosnia and Herzegovina) Velež Mostar
11	FW	Gagame Feni	21 August 1992 (aged 31)	32	19	(Solomon Islands Football Federation) Kossa
12	GK	Michael Laulae	20 May 2002 (aged 22)	2	0	(Solomon Islands Football Federation) Henderson Eels
13	MF	Atkin Kaua	4 April 1996 (aged 28)	27	5	(Solomon Islands Football Federation) Laugu United
14	DF	Calvin Ohasio	5 April 2000 (aged 24)	7	0	(Solomon Islands Football Federation) Central Coast
15	FW	Joses Nawo (captain)	3 May 1988 (aged 36)	50	8	(Solomon Islands Football Federation) Kossa
16	FW	Bobby Leslie	3 March 2000 (aged 24)	8	2	(Solomon Islands Football Federation) Central Coast
17	FW	Alvin Hou	18 September 1996 (aged 27)	23	6	(Solomon Islands Football Federation) Solomon Warriors
18	MF	Hadyn Irodao	29 October 2002 (aged 21)	0	0	(Solomon Islands Football Federation) Central Coast
19	DF	Steven Koti	10 June 2000 (aged 24)	0	0	(Solomon Islands Football Federation) Kossa
20	GK	Harold Nauania	10 October 1997 (aged 26)	1	0	(Solomon Islands Football Federation) Waneagu United
21	DF	David Supa	21 December 2000 (aged 23)	11	0	(Solomon Islands Football Federation) Central Coast
22	DF	Prince Tahanipue	13 January 1995 (aged 29)	7	0	(Solomon Islands Football Federation) Central Coast
23	MF	Marlon Tahioa	28 November 1998 (aged 25)	8	0	(Solomon Islands Football Federation) Central Coast

=== Vanuatu ===
Vanuatu announced their final squad on 4 June 2024. On 15 June, Dick Sablan was replaced by Joshua Willie.

Head coach: (Brazil) Juliano Schmeling

No.	Pos.	Player	Date of birth (age)	Caps	Goals	Club
1	GK	James Iamar	25 January 1997 (aged 27)	0	0	(Vanuatu Football Federation) Tafea
2	DF	Lency Philip	8 June 1997 (aged 27)	10	0	(Vanuatu Football Federation) Classic
3	DF	Timothy Boulet	29 November 1998 (aged 25)	11	0	(New Zealand Football) Auckland City
4	DF	Brian Kaltak (captain)	30 September 1993 (aged 30)	22	5	(Football Australia) Central Coast Mariners
5	DF	Jared Clark	21 January 1998 (aged 26)	1	0	(Football Australia) FK Beograd
6	DF	Jason Thomas	20 January 1997 (aged 27)	21	0	(Vanuatu Football Federation) Erakor Golden Star
7	DF	Michel Coulon	3 December 1995 (aged 28)	16	1	(Vanuatu Football Federation) Yatel
8	MF	Claude Aru	25 April 1997 (aged 27)	10	1	(Vanuatu Football Federation) North Efate United
9	FW	Alex Saniel	8 November 1996 (aged 27)	18	1	(Football Australia) Northern Demons
10	MF	Bong Kalo	18 January 1997 (aged 27)	21	3	(Vanuatu Football Federation) ABM Galaxy
11	DF	Tasso Jeffrey	12 August 1998 (aged 25)	7	0	(Football Australia) Western Strikers
12	GK	Dgen Leo	6 August 2000 (aged 23)	1	0	(Vanuatu Football Federation) Classic
13	FW	Johnathan Spokeyjack	13 November 1998 (aged 25)	11	1	(Vanuatu Football Federation) Ifira Black Bird
14	MF	John Wohale	9 July 1997 (aged 26)	11	1	(Vanuatu Football Federation) Ifira Black Bird
15	FW	Godine Tenene	3 May 1998 (aged 26)	10	2	(Vanuatu Football Federation) Ifira Black Bird
16	MF	John Alick	25 April 1991 (aged 33)	20	0	(Solomon Islands Football Federation) Solomon Warriors
17	DF	Kerry Iawak	16 March 1996 (aged 28)	2	0	(Vanuatu Football Federation) Ifira Black Bird
18	FW	Kensi Tangis	19 December 1991 (aged 32)	31	8	(Vanuatu Football Federation) ABM Galaxy
19	MF	Jayson Timatua	27 December 1998 (aged 25)	3	0	(Vanuatu Football Federation) ABM Galaxy
20	MF	Alick Worworbu	27 August 1997 (aged 26)	0	0	(Vanuatu Football Federation) Yatel
21	FW	Joe Moses	22 May 2002 (aged 22)	5	2	(Vanuatu Football Federation) ABM Galaxy
22	MF	Barry Mansale	1 November 1995 (aged 28)	11	1	(Vanuatu Football Federation) Yatel
23	GK	Joshua Willie	13 June 2000 (aged 24)	2	0	(Vanuatu Football Federation) ABM Galaxy

== Group B ==
=== Fiji ===
Fiji announced their 25-men preiliminary squad on 24 April 2024. The final squad was announced on 5 June.

Head coach: (Wales) Rob Sherman

No.	Pos.	Player	Date of birth (age)	Caps	Goals	Club
1	GK	Aydin Mustahib	28 May 2004 (aged 20)	1	0	(New Zealand Football) Manurewa
2	DF	Scott Wara	22 September 1999 (aged 24)	3	0	(The Football Association) Stalybridge Celtic
3	DF	Gabriele Matanisiga	14 June 1995 (aged 29)	10	2	(New Zealand Football) Wellington Olympic
4	DF	Ivan Kumar	17 June 1997 (aged 26)	2	0	(Fiji Football Association) Rewa
5	MF	Sitiveni Cavuilagi	26 July 1994 (aged 29)	11	0	(Fiji Football Association) Lautoka
6	MF	Thomas Dunn	19 January 2003 (aged 21)	5	3	(Fiji Football Association) Navua
7	MF	Mohammed Raheem	10 August 2003 (aged 20)	2	2	(Fiji Football Association) Ba
8	MF	Setareki Hughes	8 June 1995 (aged 29)	39	1	(Fiji Football Association) Rewa
9	FW	Roy Krishna (captain)	30 August 1987 (aged 36)	52	36	(All India Football Federation) Odisha
10	MF	Nabil Begg	17 March 2004 (aged 20)	8	2	(New Zealand Football) Auckland City
11	MF	Brendan McMullen	30 June 2002 (aged 21)	3	0	(New Zealand Football) Stop Out
12	MF	Tevita Waranaivalu	16 September 1995 (aged 28)	20	2	(Fiji Football Association) Rewa
13	MF	Mosese Nabose	1 July 1998 (aged 25)	0	0	(Fiji Football Association) Tailevu Naitasiri
14	FW	Sairusi Nalaubu	14 December 1996 (aged 27)	13	7	(Fiji Football Association) Lautoka
15	FW	Etonia Dogalau	24 February 2001 (aged 23)	6	1	(Fiji Football Association) Ba
16	DF	Atonio Tuivuna	20 March 1995 (aged 29)	10	1	(Fiji Football Association) Lautoka
17	DF	Filipe Baravilala	25 November 1994 (aged 29)	9	0	(Fiji Football Association) Navua
18	DF	Lekima Gonerau	8 December 1989 (aged 34)	6	0	(Fiji Football Association) Labasa
19	MF	Merrill Nand	22 September 2000 (aged 23)	4	1	(Fiji Football Association) Suva
20	GK	Joji Vuakaca	24 March 2003 (aged 21)	0	0	(Fiji Football Association) Labasa
21	DF	Sterling Vasconcellos	19 April 2005 (aged 19)	6	0	(Fiji Football Association) Lautoka
22	GK	Isikeli Sevanaia	11 January 2003 (aged 21)	1	0	(Fiji Football Association) Rewa
23	FW	Rusiate Matarerega	17 January 1993 (aged 31)	18	4	(Fiji Football Association) Nadi

=== Papua New Guinea ===
Papua New Guinea announced their final squad on 3 June 2024.

Head coach: (Australia) Warren Moon

No.	Pos.	Player	Date of birth (age)	Caps	Goals	Club
1	GK	Dave Tomare	26 April 1997 (aged 27)	2	0	(Papua New Guinea Football Association) Hekari United
2	DF	Daniel Joe	29 May 1990 (aged 34)	32	0	(Papua New Guinea Football Association) Hekari United
3	DF	Godfrey Haro	30 June 1998 (aged 25)	8	0	(Papua New Guinea Football Association) Hekari United
4	DF	Alwin Komolong (captain)	2 November 1994 (aged 29)	22	1	(Football Australia) Queensland Lions
5	DF	Felix Komolong	6 March 1997 (aged 27)	21	0	(Papua New Guinea Football Association) Lae City
6	FW	Ati Kepo	15 January 1996 (aged 28)	18	6	(Papua New Guinea Football Association) Hekari United
7	MF	Jethro Yumange	10 March 2002 (aged 22)	0	0	(United States Soccer Federation) River Light
8	MF	Lee-Navu Faunt	4 May 2003 (aged 21)	3	0	(Football Australia) Redlands United
10	FW	Kolu Kepo	15 July 1993 (aged 30)	18	4	(Papua New Guinea Football Association) Hekari United
11	MF	Yagi Yasasa	17 August 2000 (aged 23)	14	0	(Papua New Guinea Football Association) Hekari United
12	FW	Matu Ben	31 January 2004 (aged 20)	0	0	(Papua New Guinea Football Association) Lae City
13	FW	Tommy Semmy	30 September 1994 (aged 29)	18	6	(Football Australia) Melbourne Knights
14	MF	Emmanuel Simon	25 December 1992 (aged 31)	33	4	(Papua New Guinea Football Association) Lae City
15	DF	Arol Tateng	5 April 1997 (aged 27)	0	0	(Papua New Guinea Football Association) Southern Strikers
16	MF	Pala Paul	25 July 1999 (aged 24)	5	0	(Papua New Guinea Football Association) Southern Strikers
17	MF	Kenneth Arah	15 January 1996 (aged 28)	4	0	(Papua New Guinea Football Association) Gulf Komara
18	MF	Bruce Tiampo	25 July 2002 (aged 21)	2	0	(Papua New Guinea Football Association) Lae City
20	DF	Lennard Atterwell	21 November 2005 (aged 18)	0	0	(Portuguese Football Federation) Alcochetense
21	MF	Troy Dobbin	24 September 2001 (aged 22)	4	0	(Football Australia) Queensland Lions
25	MF	Solomon Rani	22 May 2002 (aged 22)	1	0	(Papua New Guinea Football Association) Hekari United
26	DF	Raymond Diho	25 June 2006 (aged 17)	0	0	(Football Australia) North Geelong Warriors
27	GK	Vagi Koniel	26 October 1996 (aged 27)	0	0	(Papua New Guinea Football Association) Southern Strikers
28	GK	Ronald Warisan	20 September 1989 (aged 34)	28	0	(Papua New Guinea Football Association) Lae City

=== Samoa ===
Samoa announced their final squad on 10 June 2024.

Head coach: (Northern Ireland) Ryan Stewart

No.	Pos.	Player	Date of birth (age)	Caps	Goals	Club
1	GK	Joel Bartley	13 April 2005 (aged 19)	3	0	(Football Australia) Sydney United
2	DF	Luke Tolo-Kent	29 April 2003 (aged 21)	3	0	(New Zealand Football) Miramar Rangers
3	DF	Luke Salisbury	15 September 2004 (aged 19)	3	0	(New Zealand Football) Roslyn-Wakari
4	DF	Taine Wilson	8 November 2004 (aged 19)	3	0	(New Zealand Football) Nelson Suburbs
5	MF	Kaleb De Groot-Green	11 May 2002 (aged 22)	3	0	(New Zealand Football) Christchurch United
6	DF	Andrew Setefano (captain)	10 August 1987 (aged 36)	19	0	(Football Federation Samoa) Lupe o le Soaga
7	FW	Darcy Knight	18 February 2000 (aged 24)	0	0	(New Zealand Football) Onehunga Mangere United
8	MF	Jarvis Vaai	20 April 2003 (aged 21)	2	0	(Football Federation Samoa) Lupe o le Soaga
9	FW	Pharrell Trainor	20 June 2006 (aged 17)	3	1	(German Football Association) Viktoria 06 Griesheim
10	FW	Greg Siamoa	21 August 2003 (aged 20)	0	0	(Football Australia) Green Gully
11	FW	Juan Gobbi	17 November 2005 (aged 18)	0	0	(Football Australia) Sydney Olympic
12	DF	Harry Chote	4 November 1999 (aged 24)	0	0	(New Zealand Football) Miramar Rangers
13	MF	Jesse Vine	23 January 2003 (aged 21)	0	0	(Football Australia) Kemps Creek United
14	MF	Dauntae Mariner	25 January 2000 (aged 24)	3	0	(New Zealand Football) Nelson Suburbs
15	DF	Niko Steinmetz	20 April 2000 (aged 24)	0	0	(New Zealand Football) Western Springs
16	MF	Caleb Hilbron	14 October 1993 (aged 30)	0	0	(New Zealand Football) Island Bay United
17	DF	Faitalia Hamilton-Pama	20 April 2000 (aged 24)	6	1	(New Zealand Football) Western Springs
18	FW	Michael Tumua Leo	15 January 2003 (aged 21)	3	5	(Football Federation Samoa) Lupe o le Soaga
19	MF	Alex Malauulu	12 March 2006 (aged 18)	0	0	(Argentine Football Association) San Jorge
20	FW	Dilo Tumua	15 March 2000 (aged 24)	3	2	(Football Federation Samoa) Vaivase-Tai
21	FW	Kyah Cahill	13 March 2003 (aged 21)	0	0	(Qatar Football Association) Lusail
22	GK	Kirk Auvele	10 June 2006 (aged 18)	0	0	(Football Federation Samoa) Vaivase-Tai
23	GK	Paul Taupau	31 January 2001 (aged 23)	0	0	(New Zealand Football) Franklin United

=== Tahiti ===
Tahiti announced their final squad, containing 21 players rather than the allowed 23, on 6 June 2024.

Head coach: Samuel Garcia

No.	Pos.	Player	Date of birth (age)	Caps	Goals	Club
1	GK	Tevaearai Tamatai	15 January 2001 (aged 23)	0	0	(Tahitian Football Federation) Vénus
3	DF	Matatia Paama	3 October 1992 (aged 31)	15	1	(Tahitian Football Federation) Pirae
4	DF	Haumau Tanetoa	18 November 2004 (aged 19)	0	0	(Tahitian Football Federation) Pirae
5	DF	Rainui Aroita	25 January 1994 (aged 30)	2	0	(Tahitian Football Federation) Tamarii Faa'a
6	MF	Terai Bremond	16 May 2001 (aged 23)	4	0	(Tahitian Football Federation) Vénus
7	DF	Kévin Barbe	2 September 1997 (aged 26)	10	1	(Tahitian Football Federation) Vénus
8	DF	Eddy Kaspard	27 May 2001 (aged 23)	8	3	(Tahitian Football Federation) Tefana
9	MF	Tauhiti Keck	1 August 1994 (aged 29)	13	6	(Tahitian Football Federation) Vénus
10	MF	Teaonui Tehau (captain)	1 September 1992 (aged 31)	38	27	(Tahitian Football Federation) Vénus
11	FW	Roonui Tinirauarii	14 March 1997 (aged 27)	7	5	(Tahitian Football Federation) Dragon
12	DF	Mauri Heitaa	31 July 1999 (aged 24)	4	0	(Tahitian Football Federation) Vénus
13	MF	Frank Papaura	6 April 2005 (aged 19)	5	0	(Tahitian Football Federation) Pueu
14	MF	Alvin Tehau	10 April 1989 (aged 35)	24	9	(Tahitian Football Federation) Pirae
15	DF	Pothin Poma	13 February 1997 (aged 27)	0	0	(Tahitian Football Federation) Vénus
16	GK	Teave Teamotuaitau	17 April 1992 (aged 32)	14	0	(Tahitian Football Federation) Tefana
17	DF	Téva Lossec	3 December 2002 (aged 21)	4	1	(United States Soccer Federation) Campbell Fighting Camels
18	MF	Manuarii Shan	23 February 2004 (aged 20)	4	0	(Tahitian Football Federation) Vénus
19	FW	Ariiura Labaste	26 July 2002 (aged 21)	0	0	(Tahitian Football Federation) Pirae
20	DF	Taumihau Tiatia	25 July 1991 (aged 32)	7	0	(Tahitian Football Federation) Pirae
21	FW	Matéo Degrumelle	22 August 2003 (aged 20)	4	1	(French Football Federation) Le Havre
23	GK	François Decoret	10 March 1999 (aged 25)	2	0	(Tahitian Football Federation) Pirae

== Statistics ==
=== By age ===
==== Players ====
- Oldest: (Samoa) Andrew Setefano (36 years, 310 days)
- Youngest: (Papua New Guinea) Raymond Diho (17 years, 356 days)

==== Goalkeepers ====
- Oldest: (Papua New Guinea) Ronald Warisan (34 years, 269 days)
- Youngest: (Samoa) Kirk Auvele (18 years, 5 days)

==== Captains ====
- Oldest: (Samoa) Andrew Setefano (36 years, 310 days)
- Youngest: (New Zealand) Liberato Cacace (23 years, 262 days)

==== Coaches ====
- Oldest: (Wales) Rob Sherman (Fiji) (63 years, 299 days)
- Youngest: (Northern Ireland) Ryan Stewart (Samoa) (39 years, 32 days)

=== By club nationality ===
Nations in bold are participant nations in the tournament

Players	Clubs
28	**New Zealand**
22	**Solomon Islands**
19	**Tahiti**
18	**Fiji**
17	**Vanuatu**
16	**Papua New Guinea**
15	Australia
5	England, **Samoa**
2	United States
1	Argentina, Bosnia and Herzegovina, Denmark, France, Germany, India, Italy, Portugal, Qatar, Scotland
