= 2016 OFC U-20 Championship squads =

The 2016 OFC U-20 Championship was the 21st edition of the OFC U-20 Championship, the biennial international youth football championship organised by the Oceania Football Confederation (OFC) for the men's under-19/under-20 national teams of Oceania. Each national team had to submit a squad of 18 players, two of whom must be goalkeepers.

Players in boldface had been capped at full international level prior to the start of the tournament.

== Preliminary round ==
=== American Samoa ===
Head coach: (Tonga) Sione Mau

No.	Pos.	Player	Date of birth (age)	Caps	Goals	Club
1	GK	Kinikinilau Pouli	13 May 1999 (age 26)	3	0	
23	GK	Hinckley Tufa	September 24, 1997 (age 28)	0	0	
2	DF	Sione Moeaki	2 June 1998 (age 27)	3	0	(Football Federation American Samoa) Vaiala Tongan
3	DF	Willie Malele	13 March 1999 (age 27)	3	0	
4	DF	Frank Hunt	March 11, 1998 (age 28)	1	0	
5	DF	**Paul Collins**	31 May 1997 (age 28)	8	0	(Football Federation American Samoa) Utulei Youth
14	DF	Joseph Choi	February 18, 2000 (age 26)	1	0	
15	DF	Tala Auva'a	July 14, 2000 (age 25)	1	0	
6	MF	Michael Settle	3 December 2001 (age 24)	0	0	(United States Soccer Federation) Coronado Athletic Club
10	MF	Ferrin Manuleleua	20 August 1998 (age 27)	3	0	(Football Federation American Samoa) Pago Youth
11	MF	Gabriel Taumua	13 April 2002 (age 23)	3	0	(Football Federation American Samoa) Pago Youth
12	MF	**Tor-Lawrence Manao**	27 May 1999 (age 26)	3	0	(United States Soccer Federation) Crossfire Premier
13	MF	Takai Pouli	July 18, 2000 (age 25)	3	0	
16	MF	Simi Moeateau	July 4, 1997 (age 28)	1	0	
18	MF	Masila Siua	April 2, 2003 (age 23)	1	0	(Football Federation American Samoa) Leone Lions
7	FW	Tauamo Fe'a	23 June 1998 (age 27)	2	0	
8	FW	Joseph Purcell	20 March 2000 (age 26)	3	0	
9	FW	Steven Fiso	January 19, 2001 (age 25)	3	1	
17	FW	Aliva Nautu	16 June 1998 (age 27)	3	0	

=== Cook Islands ===
Head coach: (Cook Islands) Tuka Tisam

No.	Pos.	Player	Date of birth (age)	Caps	Goals	Club
1	GK	Keegan Inia	March 20, 1997 (age 29)	3	0	(New Zealand Football) Central United
2	DF	Jarves Aperau	November 21, 1997 (age 28)	3	0	(Cook Islands Football Association) Puaikura
3	DF	George Ellis	November 14, 1998 (age 27)	1	0	(Cook Islands Football Association) Tupapa Maraerenga
4	DF	Sunai Joseph	February 20, 1998 (age 28)	3	0	(Cook Islands Football Association) Tupapa Maraerenga
5	DF	Michael Wood	December 25, 1999 (age 26)	3	1	(New Zealand Football)
8	DF	Cahjun Willis	October 4, 1997 (age 28)	3	0	(Cook Islands Football Association) Nikao Sokattak
13	DF	Orin Ruaine-Prattley	November 3, 1997 (age 28)	3	0	(New Zealand Football) Manawatu United
17	DF	Kristian Young	December 1, 1998 (age 27)	1	0	(Cook Islands Football Association) Avatiu
6	MF	William Napa	July 4, 2000 (age 25)	2	0	(Cook Islands Football Association) Mount Albert Grammar
7	MF	Samuel Moate-Cox	August 31, 1997 (age 28)	3	0	(New Zealand Football) Canterbury United
11	MF	Thane Beal	March 26, 1997 (age 29)	3	0	(Cook Islands Football Association)
12	MF	Melbourne Matakino	March 19, 1999 (age 27)	1	0	(Cook Islands Football Association) Tupapa Maraerenga
15	MF	Bruce Bien	August 23, 1999 (age 26)	1	0	(German Football Association) TSV Hertha Walheim
16	MF	Kimiora Samuela	April 28, 1997 (age 28)	3	1	(Cook Islands Football Association) Puaikura
18	MF	Dwayne Tiputoa	December 8, 1997 (age 28)	3	4	(Cook Islands Football Association) Puaikura
9	FW	Maro Bonsu-Maro	February 26, 1997 (age 29)	0	0	(New Zealand Football) Central United
14	FW	Conroy Tiputoa	March 13, 2000 (age 26)	3	1	(Cook Islands Football Association) Puaikura

=== Samoa ===
Head Coach: (Samoa) Paul Ualesi

No.	Pos.	Player	Date of birth (age)	Caps	Goals	Club
1	GK	**Faalavelvae Matagi**	13 March 1997 (age 29)	3	0	(Football Federation Samoa) Vailima Kiwi
20	GK	Eteuati Tomasi	September 26, 1997 (age 28)	0	0	
2	DF	Peter Hunt	29 June 1999 (age 26)	3	0	
3	DF	Timothy Hunt	11 March 1997 (age 29)	3	1	
4	DF	Tauati Tanoai	19 April 1998 (age 27)	3	0	
5	DF	Maiseli Matamu	October 22, 1997 (age 28)	0	0	
17	DF	Slade Omeri	9 October 1998 (age 27)	2	0	
18	DF	Fagupo Teletolio	October 5, 2000 (age 25)	3	0	
6	MF	Xavier Tanielu	March 2, 1999 (age 27)	3	0	
7	MF	Christopher Gale	April 23, 1998 (age 27)	3	0	
8	MF	Vaa Taualai	4 June 1998 (age 27)	2	0	(Football Federation Samoa) Lupe ole Soaga
9	MF	**Samuelu Malo**	4 April 1999 (age 26)	3	2	(Football Federation Samoa) Samoa Football Academy
13	MF	Esekielu Laussen	25 July 1997 (age 28)	1	0	
14	MF	Joseph Selemaia	May 2, 1998 (age 27)	0	0	
19	MF	Faafouina Felise	October 7, 1997 (age 28)	0	0	
10	FW	Frank Mariner	4 August 1998 (age 27)	3	1	
11	FW	Brian Simi	May 12, 1999 (age 26)	2	0	
12	FW	Pago Tunupopo	24 March 1997 (age 29)	2	4	
15	FW	Vaatausili Vaa	December 10, 1997 (age 28)	3	0	
16	FW	Timote Halahingano	15 June 1999 (age 26)	0	0	(Football Federation Samoa) Vaipuna Sports Club

=== Tonga ===
Head Coach: (Tonga) Tevita Moala

No.	Pos.	Player	Date of birth (age)	Caps	Goals	Club
1	GK	Mahe Malafu	February 24, 1998 (age 28)	3	0	(Tonga Football Association) Tonga Football Academy
20	GK	Semisi Otukolo	June 23, 1999 (age 26)	0	0	(Tonga Football Association) Tonga Football Academy
2	DF	Kilifitoni Vea	April 8, 1998 (age 27)	1	0	(Tonga Football Association) Tonga Football Academy
3	DF	Sione Tu'ifangaloka	April 24, 1999 (age 26)	2	0	(Tonga Football Association) Tonga Football Academy
5	DF	Tevita Vakatapu	December 2, 1999 (age 26)	3	0	(Tonga Football Association) Tonga Football Academy
13	DF	Timeth Bogidua	July 2, 1998 (age 27)	1	0	(Tonga Football Association) Tonga Football Academy
18	DF	Folauhola Mesui	August 11, 1998 (age 27)	1	0	(Tonga Football Association) Tonga Football Academy
4	MF	**Sione Kite**	June 7, 1997 (age 28)	3	0	(Tonga Football Association) Lotoha'apai United
6	MF	Aisea Muli	October 7, 1998 (age 27)	1	0	(Tonga Football Association) Tonga Football Academy
7	MF	**Soakai Vea**	July 19, 1998 (age 27)	3	0	(Tonga Football Association) Lotoha'apai United
8	MF	Sateki Matakaiongo	March 6, 1998 (age 28)	3	0	(Tonga Football Association) Marist Prems
9	MF	Vai Lutu	September 30, 1999 (age 26)	3	0	(Tonga Football Association) Tonga Football Academy
11	MF	**Anthony Likiliki**	December 19, 1999 (age 26)	3	1	(Tonga Football Association) Veitongo
14	MF	Kapeliele Malafu	May 5, 1998 (age 27)	1	0	(Tonga Football Association) Tonga Football Academy
15	MF	Talatala Po'oi	March 3, 1997 (age 29)	3	1	(Tonga Football Association) Tonga Football Academy
10	FW	**Hemaloto Polovili**	July 27, 1997 (age 28)	2	3	(Tonga Football Association) Veitongo
12	FW	Fisihoi Palu	November 29, 1998 (age 27)	2	0	(Tonga Football Association) Tonga Football Academy
16	FW	Lachman Atoa	December 5, 1997 (age 28)	3	0	(Tonga Football Association) Tonga Football Academy
17	FW	Etilei Tuiono	October 10, 1999 (age 26)	1	0	(Tonga Football Association) Tonga Football Academy
19	FW	Tevita Tukimaka	November 15, 1998 (age 27)	0	0	(Tonga Football Association) Tonga Football Academy

== Second round ==
The squads were published by Oceania Football Confederation on 23 August 2016.

=== Group A ===
==== Vanuatu ====
Head coach: (Vanuatu) Etienne Mermer

No.	Pos.	Player	Date of birth (age)	Caps	Goals	Club
1	GK	Andreas Duch	12 October 1998 (age 27)	0	0	(Vanuatu Football Federation) Spirit 08
23	GK	Willie Dick	17 October 1998 (age 27)	5	0	(Vanuatu Football Federation) Shepherds United
2	DF	Joseph Iaruel	25 January 1998 (age 28)	1	0	(New Zealand Football) St Peter's College
3	DF	Jason Thomas	20 January 1997 (age 29)	9	1	(Vanuatu Football Federation) Erakor Golden Star
4	DF	Selwyn Vatu	13 June 1998 (age 27)	2	0	(Vanuatu Football Federation) Northern Region Academy
5	DF	Jesse Kalopang	1 January 1998 (age 28)	0	0	(Vanuatu Football Federation) Erakor Golden Star
13	DF	Tasso Jeffrey	24 August 1998 (age 27)	5	0	(Vanuatu Football Federation) United Malampa
14	DF	Timothy Boulet	29 November 1998 (age 27)	5	0	(Vanuatu Football Federation) Erakor Golden Star
6	MF	Claude Aru	25 April 1997 (age 28)	4	0	(Vanuatu Football Federation) Malampa Revivors
7	MF	Bong Kalo (captain)	18 January 1997 (age 29)	10	4	(Vanuatu Football Federation) Tafea
8	MF	Godine Tenene	3 May 1998 (age 27)	5	2	(Vanuatu Football Federation) Spirit 08
10	MF	Ronaldo Wilkins	30 December 1999 (age 26)	5	2	(Vanuatu Football Federation) Shepherds United
15	MF	Gregory Patrick	30 April 1998 (age 27)	3	0	(Vanuatu Football Federation) United Malampa
17	MF	Jayson Timatua	27 December 1998 (age 27)	5	0	(Vanuatu Football Federation) Shepherds United
18	MF	Max Uguna	21 May 1998 (age 27)	0	0	(Vanuatu Football Federation) Sia-Raga
19	MF	Frederick Massing	11 September 1998 (age 27)	5	1	(Vanuatu Football Federation) United Malampa
9	FW	Sylvain Worworbu	17 August 1998 (age 27)	4	0	(New Zealand Football) St Peter's College
11	FW	Jonathan Spokeyjack	13 November 1998 (age 27)	3	0	(Vanuatu Football Federation) Shepherds United
12	FW	Abednigo Sau	28 July 1998 (age 27)	5	0	(Vanuatu Football Federation) Sia-Raga
16	FW	Harison Massing	27 July 1997 (age 28)	0	0	(Vanuatu Football Federation) United Malampa

==== Fiji ====
Head coach: (Fiji) Yogendra Dutt

No.	Pos.	Player	Date of birth (age)	Caps	Goals	Club
1	GK	Jovilisi Borisi	July 31, 1997 (age 28)	3	0	(Fiji Football Association) Tavua
20	GK	Joela Biuvanua	September 4, 1998 (age 27)	0	0	(Fiji Football Association) Navua
2	DF	Savenaca Baledrokadroka	May 20, 1999 (age 26)	3	0	(Fiji Football Association) Rewa
3	DF	Suliano Tawanakoro	July 31, 1997 (age 28)	2	0	(Fiji Football Association) Ba
4	DF	Bruce Hughes	March 27, 1997 (age 29)	2	0	(Fiji Football Association) Rewa
5	DF	Vinal Prasad	April 9, 1997 (age 28)	3	0	(Fiji Football Association) Dreketi
18	DF	Jonetani Newa	July 29, 1997 (age 28)	2	0	(Fiji Football Association) Ba
19	DF	Zainal Ali		2	0	(Fiji Football Association) Nadi
6	MF	Akeimi Ralulu	March 1, 1998 (age 28)	2	0	(Fiji Football Association) Labasa
7	MF	Mataiasi Toma (c)	June 14, 1997 (age 28)	6	1	(Fiji Football Association) Nadi
8	MF	Afraz Ali	June 19, 1998 (age 27)	3	0	(Fiji Football Association) Nadi
10	MF	Jeshal Kumar		3	0	(Fiji Football Association) Nadroga
12	MF	Patrick Joseph	May 3, 1998 (age 27)	0	0	(Fiji Football Association) Nadi
13	MF	Kartik Kumar	January 26, 1998 (age 28)	3	0	(Fiji Football Association) Ba
15	MF	Ilaisa Vulimainavuso	May 16, 1997 (age 28)	2	0	(Fiji Football Association) Labasa
16	MF	Marika Rawasoi	January 26, 1998 (age 28)	2	0	(Fiji Football Association) Lautoka
9	FW	Leroy Jennings	March 3, 1998 (age 28)	3	1	(Football Association of Wales) Wrexham
11	FW	Don Raj	June 10, 1997 (age 28)	3	0	(Fiji Football Association) Suva
14	FW	Simeli Batiratu	April 15, 1998 (age 27)	1	0	(Fiji Football Association) Rewa
17	FW	France Catarogo	July 13, 1998 (age 27)	1	1	(Fiji Football Association) Labasa

==== New Caledonia ====
Head coach: (New Caledonia) Kamali Fitialeata

No.	Pos.	Player	Date of birth (age)	Caps	Goals	Club
1	GK	Mickael Ulile	July 16, 1997 (age 28)	3	0	(New Caledonian Football Federation) Magenta
20	GK	Itra Hlemu	August 22, 1998 (age 27)	0	0	(New Caledonian Football Federation) Gaïtcha FCN
2	DF	Gaetan Gope-Iwate	October 5, 1998 (age 27)	2	0	(New Caledonian Football Federation) Auteuil
3	DF	Jean-Marc Kaudre	February 7, 1999 (age 27)	3	0	(New Caledonian Football Federation) OMS Paita
4	DF	Brice Kai	February 7, 1997 (age 29)	2	0	(New Caledonian Football Federation) Tiga Sports
5	DF	Pothin Poma	February 13, 1997 (age 29)	3	1	(New Caledonian Football Federation) Hienghène Sport
16	DF	Lucas Bitaud	January 6, 1999 (age 27)	1	0	(New Caledonian Football Federation) Mont-Dore
17	DF	Johanes Bernole	May 8, 1998 (age 27)	1	0	(New Caledonian Football Federation) Hienghène Sport
18	DF	Renzo Wejieme	September 9, 1999 (age 26)	3	0	(New Caledonian Football Federation) OMS Paita
6	MF	Wapo Ele-Hmaea	October 17, 1997 (age 28)	2	0	(New Caledonian Football Federation) Gaïtcha FCN
8	MF	Shene Welepane	December 9, 1997 (age 28)	3	0	(New Caledonian Football Federation) Magenta
10	MF	Thomas Gope-Fenepej	June 4, 1997 (age 28)	3	2	(New Caledonian Football Federation) Mont-Dore
12	MF	Jean-Baptiste Weda Waitreu (captain)	January 23, 1997 (age 29)	2	0	(New Caledonian Football Federation) Gaïtcha FCN
14	MF	Romarick Luepak	October 5, 1997 (age 28)	1	0	(New Caledonian Football Federation) Auteuil
19	MF	Cyril Nypie	April 11, 2000 (age 25)	2	0	(New Caledonian Football Federation) Mont-Dore
7	FW	Bryan Ausu	November 25, 1997 (age 28)	3	0	(New Caledonian Football Federation) Gaïtcha FCN
9	FW	Albert Watrone	October 8, 1998 (age 27)	3	1	(New Caledonian Football Federation) Auteuil
11	FW	Patrick Gohe	March 27, 1997 (age 29)	2	0	(New Caledonian Football Federation) Gaïtcha FCN
13	FW	Warren Houala	June 26, 1997 (age 28)	2	1	(New Caledonian Football Federation) Hienghène Sport
15	FW	Henri Boucheron	May 20, 1998 (age 27)	1	0	(New Caledonian Football Federation) OMS Paita

==== Papua New Guinea ====
Head coach: (Papua New Guinea) Peter Gunemba

No.	Pos.	Player	Date of birth (age)	Caps	Goals	Club
1	GK	Jonathan Pole	19 January 1999 (age 27)	2	0	(Papua New Guinea Football Association) Besta United
20	GK	Edward Lakae	7 October 1997 (age 28)	2	0	(Papua New Guinea Football Association) Besta United
2	DF	Kenneth Pilailo	9 May 1998 (age 27)	2	0	(Papua New Guinea Football Association) Lae City Dwellers
3	DF	Darius James	6 September 1997 (age 28)	3	0	(Papua New Guinea Football Association) Besta United
4	DF	Edward Joshua	4 January 1999 (age 27)	0	0	(Papua New Guinea Football Association) Besta United
5	DF	Gabby Yanum	5 February 1997 (age 29)	3	1	(Papua New Guinea Football Association) Besta United
16	DF	Punchimil Kepiniu	2 June 1997 (age 28)	2	0	(Papua New Guinea Football Association) Besta United
18	DF	Felix Komolong (captain)	6 March 1997 (age 29)	7	0	(New Zealand Football) Canterbury United
6	MF	Peter Dabinyaba Jr.	23 March 1997 (age 29)	8	1	(Papua New Guinea Football Association) Lae City Dwellers
7	MF	Moses Tupa	21 December 1998 (age 27)	0	0	(Papua New Guinea Football Association) Besta United
8	MF	Gregory Togubai	22 March 1998 (age 28)	3	0	(Papua New Guinea Football Association) Besta United
9	MF	Stahl Gubag	17 July 1999 (age 26)	3	0	(Papua New Guinea Football Association) Madang Fox
11	MF	Giwi Simon	3 July 1997 (age 28)	3	0	(Papua New Guinea Football Association) Besta United
12	MF	George Korei	17 February 1998 (age 28)	1	0	(Papua New Guinea Football Association) Lae City Dwellers
13	MF	Alu Awi	20 November 1999 (age 26)	3	1	(Papua New Guinea Football Association) Besta United
14	MF	Jaggen Nalu	7 July 1997 (age 28)	2	0	(Papua New Guinea Football Association) Besta United
10	FW	Jonah Iha	31 October 1998 (age 27)	3	0	(Papua New Guinea Football Association) Besta United
15	FW	Oswald Bade	16 December 1998 (age 27)	1	0	(Papua New Guinea Football Association) Besta United
17	FW	Winston Somasi	10 March 1997 (age 29)	1	0	(Papua New Guinea Football Association) Besta United

=== Group B ===
==== Cook Islands ====
Head coach: (New Zealand) Matt Calcott

No.	Pos.	Player	Date of birth (age)	Caps	Goals	Club
1	GK	Keegan Inia (captain)	March 20, 1997 (age 29)	6	0	(New Zealand Football) Central United
20	GK	Manaariki Pierre	March 16, 2001 (age 25)	0	0	(Cook Islands Football Association) Tupapa Maraerenga
2	DF	Jarves Aperau	November 21, 1997 (age 28)	6	0	(Cook Islands Football Association) Puaikura
3	DF	George Ellis	November 14, 1998 (age 27)	3	0	(Cook Islands Football Association) Tupapa Maraerenga
4	DF	Sunai Joseph	February 20, 1998 (age 28)	6	0	(Cook Islands Football Association) Tupapa Maraerenga
5	DF	Michael Wood	December 25, 1999 (age 26)	6	1	(New Zealand Football)
8	DF	Cahjun Willis	October 4, 1997 (age 28)	5	0	(Cook Islands Football Association) Nikao Sokattak
13	MF	Orin Ruaine-Prattley	November 3, 1997 (age 28)	6	0	(New Zealand Football) Manawatu United
17	DF	Kristian Young	December 1, 1998 (age 27)	1	0	(Cook Islands Football Association) Avatiu
6	MF	Kimiora Samuela	April 28, 1997 (age 28)	6	1	(Cook Islands Football Association) Puaikura
7	MF	Samuel Moate-Cox	August 31, 1997 (age 28)	6	0	(Cook Islands Football Association) Puaikura
11	MF	Thane Beal	March 26, 1997 (age 29)	6	0	(Football Australia) Gold Coast City
12	MF	Melbourne Matakino	March 19, 1999 (age 27)	2	0	(Cook Islands Football Association) Tupapa Maraerenga
15	MF	Owenne Matapo	November 4, 1999 (age 26)	2	0	(Cook Islands Football Association) Mount Albert Grammar
18	MF	Dwayne Tiputoa	December 8, 1997 (age 28)	6	5	(Cook Islands Football Association) Puaikura
14	FW	Conroy Tiputoa	March 13, 2000 (age 26)	6	1	(Cook Islands Football Association) Puaikura

==== New Zealand ====
Head coach: (New Zealand) Darren Bazeley

No.	Pos.	Player	Date of birth (age)	Caps	Goals	Club
1	GK	Michael Woud	16 January 1999 (age 27)	2	0	(The Football Association) Sunderland
12	GK	Cameron Brown		0	0	(New Zealand Football) Waitemata
2	DF	Jack-Henry Sinclair	23 February 1998 (age 28)	1	0	(New Zealand Football) Wellington Phoenix
3	DF	Sean Liddicoat	14 May 1997 (age 28)	2	0	(New Zealand Football) Coastal Spirit
4	DF	Nando Pijnaker		0	0	(New Zealand Football) Western Suburbs
5	DF	Hunter Ashworth	8 January 1998 (age 28)	2	0	(United States Soccer Federation) University of San Francisco
6	DF	Luke Johnson	15 April 1998 (age 27)	2	0	(New Zealand Football) Western Springs
13	DF	Charlie Thomas		2	0	(New Zealand Football) Western Springs
18	DF	Reese Cox		2	0	(New Zealand Football) Western Springs
8	MF	Moses Dyer	21 March 1997 (age 29)	9	1	(New Zealand Football) Onehunga Sports
10	MF	Clayton Lewis	12 February 1997 (age 29)	10	4	(New Zealand Football) Onehunga Sports
11	MF	Sarpreet Singh	20 February 1999 (age 27)	2	0	(New Zealand Football) Wellington Phoenix
14	MF	Jake Porter		2	0	(New Zealand Football) Waitakere United
16	MF	Joe Bell	27 April 1999 (age 26)	1	0	(New Zealand Football) Wellington Phoenix
7	FW	Logan Rogerson	28 May 1998 (age 27)	2	0	(New Zealand Football) Wellington Phoenix
9	FW	Myer Bevan	23 April 1997 (age 28)	2	4	(The Football Association) Nike Academy
15	FW	Lucas Imrie	20 May 1998 (age 27)	2	1	(New Zealand Football) Western Springs
17	FW	George Debenham		1	0	(New Zealand Football) Western Springs

==== Solomon Islands ====
Head coach: (Spain) Pedro Mateo

No.	Pos.	Player	Date of birth (age)	Caps	Goals	Club
1	GK	Desmond Tutu	29 September 1997 (age 28)	4	0	(Solomon Islands Football Federation) West Honiara
12	GK	Harold Nauania	10 October 1997 (age 28)	1	0	(Solomon Islands Football Federation) Marist Fire
2	DF	Sedrick Doliasi	5 June 1997 (age 28)	4	0	
3	DF	Joe Gise	19 December 1998 (age 27)	4	1	(Solomon Islands Football Federation) West Honiara
4	DF	Richard Raramo (captain)	22 August 1998 (age 27)	4	1	(Solomon Islands Football Federation) Marist Fire
5	DF	Kisina Silas	9 December 1998 (age 27)	4	0	(Solomon Islands Football Federation) Kossa
6	DF	Steven Toleyi	13 October 1997 (age 28)	4	0	
13	DF	Ian Kalu	16 July 1999 (age 26)	0	0	(Solomon Islands Football Federation) Hana
20	DF	John Dauta	27 August 1998 (age 27)	0	0	
7	MF	David Filia	18 April 1998 (age 27)	4	0	(Solomon Islands Football Federation) Malaita Kingz
8	MF	Molis Gagame		2	0	(Solomon Islands Football Federation) Solomon Warriors
10	MF	Albert Witney	28 August 1997 (age 28)	4	3	(Solomon Islands Football Federation) Solomon Warriors
14	MF	Darold Kakasi	7 February 1999 (age 27)	0	0	
15	MF	Sandrack Tui	12 December 1997 (age 28)	0	0	
19	MF	Larry Zama	26 November 1998 (age 27)	4	0	(Solomon Islands Football Federation) Kossa
9	FW	Jabeth Solomon	25 November 1998 (age 27)	4	0	(Solomon Islands Football Federation) Western United
11	FW	Adrian Rickson	1 August 1998 (age 27)	4	0	(Solomon Islands Football Federation) Real Kakamora
16	FW	Augustine Waita	13 June 1997 (age 28)	4	1	(Solomon Islands Football Federation) Koloale FC Honiara
17	FW	Israel Tatai	4 June 1998 (age 27)	2	0	(Solomon Islands Football Federation) Kossa
18	FW	Alvin Ray	23 January 1997 (age 29)	2	0	(Solomon Islands Football Federation) Marist Fire

==== Tahiti ====
Head coach: (France) Ludovic Graugnard

No.	Pos.	Player	Date of birth (age)	Caps	Goals	Club
16	GK	Tetahio Teriinohopuaiterai	2 February 1997 (age 29)	2	0	(Tahitian Football Federation) Olympic Mahina
1	GK	Moana Pito	25 January 2000 (age 26)	1	0	(Tahitian Football Federation) Tefana
2	DF	Brandon Autai (c)	9 February 1999 (age 27)	3	0	(Tahitian Football Federation) AS Excelsior
3	DF	Tumarangi Tiatoa	24 March 1998 (age 28)	0	0	(Tahitian Football Federation) Pirae
4	DF	Vaianui Drollet	13 February 1998 (age 28)	3	0	(Tahitian Football Federation) Jeunes Tahitiens
5	DF	Hauragi Huri	7 March 1999 (age 27)	2	0	(Tahitian Football Federation) Vénus
13	DF	Joachim Teanuanua	30 April 1999 (age 26)	1	0	(Tahitian Football Federation) Pirae
17	DF	Revaru Hanere	27 February 1997 (age 29)	1	0	(Tahitian Football Federation) Tiare Tahiti
6	MF	Rayan Petitgas	26 December 1998 (age 27)	3	1	(Tahitian Football Federation) Pirae
9	MF	Heirauarii Salem (captain)	28 April 1998 (age 27)	3	3	(Tahitian Football Federation) Pirae
12	MF	Rainui Nordman	9 February 1999 (age 27)	2	0	(Tahitian Football Federation) Tiare Tahiti
14	MF	Toriki Guyot	18 September 1997 (age 28)	2	0	(Tahitian Football Federation) Tefana
15	MF	Marc Siejidr	5 May 1998 (age 27)	3	1	(Tahitian Football Federation) Pirae
18	MF	Kaena Onuu	9 May 1999 (age 26)	2	0	(Tahitian Football Federation) Tefana
19	MF	Daniel Seino	11 March 1997 (age 29)	1	0	(Tahitian Football Federation) Olympic Mahina
20	MF	Raumatahi Noho	28 August 1997 (age 28)	3	0	(Tahitian Football Federation) Pirae
7	MF	Roonui Tehau	15 December 1999 (age 26)	1	0	(Tahitian Football Federation) Vénus
8	FW	Roonui Tinirauari	14 March 1997 (age 29)	3	0	(Tahitian Football Federation) Pirae
10	FW	Michel Maihi	6 March 1998 (age 28)	3	0	(Tahitian Football Federation) Central Sport
11	FW	Sandro Tau	30 April 1997 (age 28)	2	1	(Tahitian Football Federation) Tiare Tahiti
