= Richard Iwai =

Vanuatu footballer

Personal information
- Date of birth: 15 March 1979 (age 47)
- Place of birth: Vanuatu
- Position: Forward

Team information
- Current team: Vanuatu (head coach)

Senior career*
Years	Team	Apps	(Gls)
2000–2002	Tafea		
2002–2003	Suva		
2004	Mitchelton		
2004–2007	Tafea		
2007–2008	Mitchelton		
2008–2011	Tafea		
2011	Mitchelton		
2011–2012	Tafea		

International career^{‡}
2000–2011	Vanuatu	34	(20)

Managerial career
- 2011: Vanuatu (beach)
- 2012: Vanuatu U23
- 2012–2013: Spirit 08
- 2013–2016: Amicale
- 2015: Vanuatu U23
- 2016–2018: Ifira Black Bird
- 2018–2020: Tafea
- 2020–: Yatel
- 2025: Vanuatu
- 2025–: Vanuatu United (assistant)
- 2026–: Vanuatu
Medal record
Men's football
Representing Vanuatu (as player)
Pacific Games
Bronze medal – third place	2003 Fiji
Bronze medal – third place	2007 Samoa
Representing Vanuatu (as manager)
MSG Prime Minister's Cup
Winner	2025 Papua New Guinea
Runner-up	2026 Fiji
- * Club domestic league appearances and goals ‡ National team caps and goals as of 12:24, 17 September 2025 (UTC)

Richard Iwai (born 15 March 1979) is a Vanuatuan association football manager and former player. He is the all-time top scorer for the Vanuatu national football team.

== Career ==
=== Club ===
Iwai began his career with local side Tafea F.C. in the Port Vila Football League. He moved abroad in 2003, joining Suva FC of the Fiji Premier League, before returning to Tafea. In 2004, he moved to Australian club Mitchelton FC of the Queensland Premier League, the top-tier league of Queensland. He made his league debut for the club against Brisbane City FC, scoring a goal and being named the Man of the Match. At the time, Iwai and teammate Etienne Mermer were Vanuatu's first and only players to ever play abroad.

After another return to Tafea in 2006, Iwai rejoined Michelton FC until 2008. He had a final stint with Michelton, signing a three-month contract in June 2011. He made his first appearance back with the club in a 2–2 draw with Queensland Lions FC in which he was named Man of the Match. While at the club, he formed an attacking partnership with Fijian international striker Esala Masi. About rejoining Mitchelton, the player said, “I am excited about playing here again. I still have a lot of friends here and, whenever I get the opportunity to play, I will try to do my best for the club...I am really happy there (Tafea) and everyone knows Tafea is my club. Of course, I will miss Tafea, the boss, the players and my family.”

=== International ===
With twenty international goals, Iwai is Vanuatu's all-time top goalscorer. He made his senior international debut on 11 April 2000 in a 2000 Melanesia Cup match against Fiji. He went on to earn thirty-four caps for the teams before playing his final match in 2011. Iwai was named Player of the Tournament for the 2000 OFC Nations Cup and scored highly in OFC Player of the Year voting that year. He finished third in the OFC Player of the Year voting in 2007, behind only Australians Mark Viduka. and Harry Kewell.

=== Managerial ===
Iwai is a long-time coach of Yatel FC of the Port Vila Football League. In 2011, he received his OFC Certificate which qualified to coach any beach soccer team in any OFC member territory. That year, he was named manager of the Vanuatu national beach soccer team for the 2011 OFC Beach Soccer Championship. The following year, he was manager of the national under-23 team for 2012 OFC Men's Olympic Qualifying Tournament while also coaching Spirit 08 FC in the Port Vila League. Iwai was head coach of Amicale FC by 2013, leading the team to the semi-finals of the 2012–13 OFC Champions League. The club went on to be eliminated by Waitakere United. Iwai took over the national under-23 squad again for the 2015 Pacific Games which doubled as qualification for the 2016 Summer Olympics. In preparation for qualification Imai lead the team in the inaugural Friendship Cup, hosted in Vanuatu. The team went undefeated against Fiji, the Solomon Islands, and New Caledonia to win the tournament. By 2016, Iwai was head coach of Ifira Black Bird FC. That season, the club qualified for the Port Vila FA Top Four Super League.

In September 2025, Iwai was named manager of Vanuatu's senior national team in preparation for the 2025 MSG Prime Minister's Cup. Iwai was selected following the performances of his club, Yatel FC over the previous two seasons. He would continue to serve as Yatel's coach in addition to his new role. Under Iwai, Vanuatu went on to defeat Papua New Guinea in the final to win the 2025 MSG Prime Minister's Cup.

In December 2025, Iwai was named as part of head coach Lars Hopp's staff for Vanuatu United FC as the club prepared to participate in the inaugural season of the OFC Pro League.

== Personal ==
Iwai is the father of Yatel FC player Waesele Iwai.

== Career statistics ==
=== International goals ===
Scores and results list Vanuatu's goal tally first.

List of international goals scored by Richard Iwai
No.	Date	Venue	Opponent	Score	Result	Competition
1	11 April 2000	National Stadium, Suva, Fiji	Fiji	1–4	1–4	2000 Melanesia Cup
2	13 April 2000	National Stadium, Suva, Fiji	New Caledonia		6–0	2000 Melanesia Cup
3	13 April 2000	National Stadium, Suva, Fiji	New Caledonia		6–0	2000 Melanesia Cup
4	21 June 2000	Stade Pater, Papeete, Tahiti	New Zealand	1–0	1–3	2000 OFC Nations Cup
5	22 June 2000	Stade Pater, Papeete, Tahiti	Tahiti	2–1	3–2	2000 OFC Nations Cup
6	6 June 2001	North Harbour Stadium, Auckland, New Zealand	Cook Islands	4–1	8–1	2002 FIFA World Cup qualification
7	6 June 2001	North Harbour Stadium, Auckland, New Zealand	Cook Islands	5–1	8–1	2002 FIFA World Cup qualification
8	6 June 2001	North Harbour Stadium, Auckland, New Zealand	Cook Islands	6–1	8–1	2002 FIFA World Cup qualification
9	6 June 2001	North Harbour Stadium, Auckland, New Zealand	Cook Islands	8–1	8–1	2002 FIFA World Cup qualification
10	8 June 2001	North Harbour Stadium, Auckland, New Zealand	Solomon Islands	1–1	2–7	2002 FIFA World Cup qualification
11	8 June 2001	North Harbour Stadium, Auckland, New Zealand	Solomon Islands	2–3	2–7	2002 FIFA World Cup qualification
12	10 July 2002	Mount Smart Stadium, Auckland, New Zealand	New Caledonia	1–0	1–0	2002 OFC Nations Cup
13	7 July 2003	National Stadium, Suva, Fiji	Kiribati	5–0	18–0	2003 South Pacific Games
14	7 July 2003	National Stadium, Suva, Fiji	Kiribati	6–0	18–0	2003 South Pacific Games
15	7 July 2003	National Stadium, Suva, Fiji	Kiribati	8–0	18–0	2003 South Pacific Games
16	7 July 2003	National Stadium, Suva, Fiji	Kiribati	12–0	18–0	2003 South Pacific Games
17	7 July 2003	National Stadium, Suva, Fiji	Kiribati	13–0	18–0	2003 South Pacific Games
18	6 June 2004	Marden Sports Complex, Adelaide, Australia	Tahiti	1–0	1–2	2004 OFC Nations Cup
19	25 August 2007	Toleafoa J.S. Blatter Complex, Apia, Samoa	Samoa	1–0	4–0	2007 South Pacific Games
20	29 August 2007	Toleafoa J.S. Blatter Complex, Apia, Samoa	American Samoa	7–0	15–0	2007 South Pacific Games
Last updated 17 September 2025

=== International career statistics ===
As of match played 24 January 2011

Vanuatu
Year	Apps	Goals
2000	6	5
2001	3	6
2002	5	1
2003	6	5
2004	7	1
2007	6	2
2011	1	0
Total	34	20

== Honours ==
=== Player ===
Vanuatu

- Pacific Games: Bronze Medalist, 2003, 2007

=== Manager ===
Vanuatu

- MSG Prime Minister's Cup: 2025; Runner-Up, 2026
