= 2011–12 Port Vila Premier League =

2011–12 TVL Premier League
- Season: 2011–12
- Champions: Amicale FC
- Relegated: Teouma Academy
- Matches: 56
- Goals: 183 (3.27 per match)

The 2011–12 TVL Premier League or 2011–12 Port Vila Premier League is the 18th season of the Port Vila Premier League top division.

The top five of the league qualify for the 2012 VFF National Super League.

Amicale FC were the champions and Teouma Academy relegated to the 2012–13 TVL First Division.

== Teams ==
- Amicale FC
- Ifira Black Bird
- Seveners United
- Shepherds United
- Spirit 08
- Tafea FC
- Teouma Academy
- Tupuji Imere

== Standings ==
Pos	Team	Pld	W	D	L	GF	GA	GD	Pts	Qualification or relegation
1	Amicale FC (C)	14	12	1	1	50	4	+46	37	Advance to the 2012 VFF National Super League
2	Tafea FC (Q)	14	11	0	3	35	8	+27	33	Advance to the 2012 VFF National Super League
3	Shepherds United (Q)	14	7	2	5	25	24	+1	23	Advance to the 2012 VFF National Super League
4	Tupuji Imere (Q)	14	5	3	6	14	27	−13	18	Advance to the 2012 VFF National Super League
5	Seveners United (Q)	14	4	4	6	15	24	−9	16	Advance to the 2012 VFF National Super League
6	Spirit 08	14	4	3	7	18	20	−2	15	
7	Ifira Black Bird	14	3	1	10	13	40	−27	10	
8	Teouma Academy	14	2	2	10	13	36	−23	8	Relegated to the 2012–13 TVL First Division

Updated to match(es) played on 14 October 2015. Source:
Rules for classification: 1) points; 2) goal difference; 3) number of goals scored.
(C) Champions; (Q) Qualified for the phase indicated
