= Tasso Jeffrey =

Vanuatuan footballer (born 1998)

Personal information
- Date of birth: 12 August 1998 (age 28)
- Place of birth: Vanuatu
- Position: Defender

Senior career*
Years	Team	Apps	(Gls)
–2016	Teouma Academy		
2016–2018	Mauwia		
2018–2020	Malampa Revivors		
2020–2021	ABM Galaxy		
2021–2022	FK Beograd		
2023	Gawler Eagles		

International career
2022–	Vanuatu	9	(0)
Medal record
Men's football
Representing Vanuatu
OFC Nations Cup
Runner-up	2024 Fiji/Vanuatu
MSG Prime Minister's Cup
Third place	2023 New Caledonia
- * Club domestic league appearances and goals

Tasso Jeffrey (born 12 August 1998) is a Vanuatuan footballer who plays as a defender.

== Early life ==
Jeffrey was born in 1998 in Vanuatu. He grew up in Luganville, Vanuatu.

== Club career ==
Jeffrey started his career with Vanuatuan side Teouma Academy. In 2016, he signed for Vanuatuan side Mauwia. In 2018, he signed for Vanuatuan side Malampa Revivors. In 2020, he signed for Vanuatuan side ABM Galaxy. In 2021, he signed for Vanuatuan side FK Beograd. In 2021, he signed for Australian side FK Beograd. In 2023, he signed for Australian side Gawler Eagles.

== International career ==
Jeffrey has represented Vanuatu internationally. He was called up to the Vanuatu national football team for 2022 FIFA World Cup qualification.

== Style of play ==
Jeffrey mainly operates as a defender. He has been described as having "quick reflexes and excellent reading of the game".

== Honours ==
Vanuatu

- OFC Nations Cup: Runner-up, 2024
- MSG Prime Minister's Cup: 3rd place, 2023
