= Rexley Tarivuti =

Vanuatuan association footballer

Rexley Tarivuti (born 1 December 1985) is a retired Vanuatuan international footballer who played for Vanuatu national football team as a CB as well as Vanuatuan club Yatel F.C. at club level.

== Youth ==
Tarivuti was born on December 1, 1985, in Vanuatu. He was also raised there.

== Club career ==
Tarivuti first played for Sia-Raga F.C. in the 05/06 season, after 2 years there, he transferred to the club Yatel F.C. in the 06/07 season. In the 11/12 season, he transferred to Amicale F.C. During his time with Amicale F.C, he won the Vanuatu National Soccer League and Port Vila Premier League.

== International career ==
Tarivuti played for the Vanuatu National Football Team. He was present during the 2010 FIFA World Cup qualification.
