= Spirit 08 F.C. =

Association football club in Vanuatu

Spirit 08 FC
- Full name: Spirit 08 Football Club
- Ground: Port Vila Municipal Stadium; Port Vila, Vanuatu
- Capacity: 6.500
- Manager: Etienne Mermer
- League: Port Vila Premier League
- 2016: 8th (relegated)

Spirit 08 FC are an association football club based in Vanuatu. Competed in the TVL League, Vanuatu's top tier. Spirit finished in 4th place in the league in 2013/14. Spirit were represented at the 2011 Pacific Games in New Caledonia by four players, namely Rickson Tari, Rexley Tarivuti, Robert Tasso and Nikiau Filiamy.

== Performance in Competitions ==
=== 2010 Ken Memorial Cup ===
Results Table:

Round	Opponent	Result
Round 1	Westtan Broncos FC	W 1–0
Round 2	Yatel FC	D 0–0
Round 3	Seveners United FC	W 5–0

Spirit had an excellent start in the competition, winning twice and drawing once without conceding a single goal in the process. Spirit 08 topped their four-team group and qualified for the semi-finals of the competition, but the Cup was eventually won by Tafea FC.

=== 2010–11 Port Vila Premier League ===
Pos	Team	Pld	W	D	L	GF	GA	GD	Pts	Qualification or relegation
2	Tafea FC (Q)	14	11	1	2	45	13	+32	34	Advance to the 2011 VFF National Super League
3	Tupuji Imere (Q)	14	8	0	6	29	25	+4	24	Advance to the 2011 VFF National Super League
4	Spirit 08 (Q)	14	7	1	6	21	19	+2	22	Advance to the 2011 VFF National Super League
5	Shepherds United (Q)	14	6	2	6	18	26	−8	20	Advance to the 2011 VFF National Super League
6	Teouma Academy	14	5	3	6	23	21	+2	18	

Rules for classification: 1) points; 2) goal difference; 3) number of goals scored.
(Q) Qualified for the phase indicated

In finishing in the top five of the league, Spirit qualified for the next round. The club made an excellent start to the season, winning their first four games and only conceding two goals in the process. The club had almost identical home and away form, winning three, drawing two and losing four at home and winning four, drawing two and losing three on the road.
