= Port Vila Football League =

Association football league in Vanuatu

- Founded: 1994; 32 years ago
- Country: Vanuatu
- Confederation: OFC
- Number of clubs: 30
- Level on pyramid: 1 (in Port Vila)
- Relegation to: Port Vila First Division
- Domestic cup(s): Port Vila Shield; Port Vila FA Cup
- Current champions: ABM Galaxy (2025-26)
- Most championships: Tafea (16 titles)
- Top scorer: Kensi Tangis (73 goals)
- Website: vanuafoot.vu

The Port Vila Football League is an association football league in Port Vila, Vanuatu. It consists of four competitions: Port Vila Super League, Port Vila Premier League, Port Vila First Division and Port Vila Second Division. The league's domestic cup is the Port Vila FA Cup, in which all 4 divisions compete in.

The champions of the Super League division qualify for that year's VFF Champions League, the winner of which qualifies for the following season's OFC Champions League.

The league is not fully professional.

== Format ==
Each division plays a double round-robin schedule. The champions of the Super League division qualify for that year's VFF Champions League, while the champions of the Premier League, First Division, and Second Division are promoted to the next higher division, replacing the last-placed teams in the Super League, Premier League, or First Division. In addition, the second-placed team from the Premier League, First Division, and Second Division plays a relegation play-off against the second-to-last team from the Super League, Premier League, or First Division.

For the 2025–26 season, the First Division is divided into two six-team pools. At the end of the season, the winners of each pool play each other, with the winner earning direct promotion to next season's Premier League, and the loser qualifying for the relegation play-off match against the second-to-last team from the Premier League.

== Members ==
Port Vila Super	Port Vila Premier League	Port Vila First Division	Port Vila Second Division
Level on pyramid – 1	Level on pyramid – 2	Level on pyramid – 3	Level on pyramid – 4
ABM Galaxy; Ifira Black Bird; Mauriki; Naka; North Efate United; Yatel	Erakor Golden Star; Pango Green Bird; Penama; Tafea; Tupuji Imere; United Malampa	Pool A: Amicale; Black Diamond; Mauwia; Varona; Taut Iamak; Shalom	Beverly Hills; Maan Ksakes; Mala; Sia-Raga; Tanauata; Vanuatu Academy
ABM Galaxy; Ifira Black Bird; Mauriki; Naka; North Efate United; Yatel	Erakor Golden Star; Pango Green Bird; Penama; Tafea; Tupuji Imere; United Malampa	Pool B: Seveners United; Shepherds United; Lakotau; Pele FC; Tewalu; Threeland	Beverly Hills; Maan Ksakes; Mala; Sia-Raga; Tanauata; Vanuatu Academy

All teams and leagues are for the 2025-26 season

== List of champions ==
=== Port Vila Premier League ===
The list with Port Villa Champions:

Season	Winner	Runner-up	Topscorer	Goals
1994	Tafea			
1995	Tafea			
1996	Tafea			
1997	Tafea			
1998	Tafea			
1999	Tafea			
2000	Tafea			
2001	Tafea			
2002	Tafea	Shepherds United		
2003	Tafea	Shepherds United		
2004	Tafea			
2005	Tafea			
2006	Tafea			
2007	Tafea	Tupuji Imere		
2008–09	Tafea	Amicale		
2009–10	Amicale	Tafea		
2010–11	Amicale	Tafea		
2011–12	Amicale	Tafea		
2012–13	Amicale	Erakor Golden Star		
2013–14	Amicale	Erakor Golden Star	Bernard Daniel	7 goals each.
2013–14	Amicale	Erakor Golden Star	Sanni Issa	7 goals each.
2014–15	Amicale	Erakor Golden Star		
2016	Erakor Golden Star	Amicale		
2017	Ifira Black Bird	Erakor Golden Star		
2017–18	Tupuji Imere	Erakor Golden Star		
2018–19	Tafea	Galaxy		
2019–20	Ifira Black Bird	Galaxy	Kensi Tangis	21 goals
2020–21	Galaxy	Tafea	Kensi Tangis	19 goals
2021–22	Ifira Black Bird	Mauriki	Kensi Tangis	9 goals
2022–23	Ifira Black Bird	Galaxy	Kensi Tangis	22 goals
2023–24	Ifira Black Bird	Galaxy	Jodie Tasip	
2024–25	Galaxy	Ifira Black Bird	Jayson Bule	7 goals

=== Port Vila First Division ===
Season	Winner	Runner-up
2007	Seveners United	
2008–09	Spirit 08	Teouma Academy
2009–10	Shepherds United	Ifira Black Bird
2010–11	Seveners United	
2011–12	Erakor Golden Star	
2012–13	Yatel	
2013–14	Narak Tegapu	
2014–15	Mauriki	Sia-Raga
2016	Mauwia	Seveners United
2017		
2018–19	Sia-Raga	Mauwia

=== Port Vila Second Division ===
Season	Winner	Runner-up
2014–15	ABM Galaxy	
2016	Black Diamond	
2017		

== Performances ==
Club	Winners	Runners-up
Tafea	16	3
Amicale	6	2
Ifira Black Bird	3	-
Erakor Golden Star	1	5
Tupuji Imere	1	1
Galaxy	1	–

== Domestic Cups ==
=== Port Vila Independence Cup ===
The Port Vila Independence Cup is held in July. The final match is played on July 30, Vanuatu's independence day

Season	Winner	Score	Runner-up	Ref
2019	Tupuji Imere FC	3–1	Tafea	

=== Port Vila Shield ===
The Port Vila Shield is the National Cup held in January each year since 2013.
Previous Winners of the Port Vila Shield are:

Season	Winner	Score	Runner-up	Ref
2013	Tafea FC			
2014	Tafea FC	1–0	Amicale FC	
2015	Amicale FC	1–0	Erakor Golden Star	

=== Port Vila FA Cup ===
The Port Vila FA Cup (PVFA Cup) was originally a tournament held as a warm-up for the 8 teams that play in the Digicel Premier League. As of 2016, the PVFA Cup became a tournament for all of the 27 teams of the first 3 divisions.
Previous winners of the PVFA Cup are:

Season	Winner	Score	Runner-up	Ref
2014	Tafea	3–0	Ifira Black Bird	
2016	Tupuji Imere	1–0	Erakor Golden Star	
2018	Amicale	4–1	Galaxy	
2019	Tafea	1–0	Galaxy	

== Top Four Super League ==
The Top Four Super League is a competition played between the top four teams of the Port Vila Football League to decide one of the two representatives of Vanuatu in the OFC Champions League (the other representative is from the VFF National Super League).

Season	Winner
2016	Erakor Golden Star
2017	Erakor Golden Star
2017–18	Erakor Golden Star
2018–19	Galaxy

== See also ==
VFF National Super League
