= Kensi Tangis =

Nigerian-Vanuatian footballer (born 1990)

Personal information
- Full name: Kensi Tangis
- Date of birth: January 20, 1990 (age 36)
- Place of birth: Fanafo, Espiritu Santo, Vanuatu
- Height: 1.78 m (5 ft 10 in)
- Position: Forward

Team information
- Current team: ABM Galaxy

Youth career
- Rainbow

Senior career*
| Years | Team | Apps | (Gls) |
| 2010–2011 | Milo | | |
| 2011–2014 | Amicale | | |
| 2014–2016 | Solomon Warriors | | |
| 2016–2017 | Amicale | | |
| 2017 | Central Sport | | |
| 2017 | Amicale | | |
| 2018 | Solomon Warriors | | (23) |
| 2019– | ABM Galaxy | | |

International career^{‡}
| 2011– | Vanuatu | 39 | (9) |
Medal record
Men's football
Representing Vanuatu
OFC Nations Cup
| Runner-up | 2024 Fiji/Vanuatu |
Pacific Mini Games
| Gold medal – first place | 2017 Vanuatu |
- * Club domestic league appearances and goals ‡ National team caps and goals as of 30 June 2024

Kensi Tangis (born January 20, 1990) is a Ni-Vanuatu footballer who plays as a forward for ABM Galaxy and the Vanuatu national football team.

== Career statistics ==
=== International ===
| National team | Years | Apps | Goals |
|---|---|---|---|
| Vanuatu | 2011 | 9 | 1 |
| Vanuatu | 2012 | 3 | 0 |
| Vanuatu | 2013 | 0 | 0 |
| Vanuatu | 2014 | 0 | 0 |
| Vanuatu | 2015 | 2 | 1 |
| Vanuatu | 2016 | 3 | 0 |
| Vanuatu | 2017 | 3 | 5 |
| Vanuatu | 2018 | 2 | 0 |
| Vanuatu | 2019 | 6 | 1 |
| Vanuatu | 2020 | 0 | 0 |
| Vanuatu | 2021 | 0 | 0 |
| Vanuatu | 2022 | 2 | 0 |
| Vanuatu | 2023 | 0 | 0 |
| Vanuatu | 2024 | 9 | 1 |
| Total | | 39 | 9 |

== International career ==
=== International goals ===
Scores and results list Vanuatu's goal tally first.

| No | Date | Venue | Opponent | Score | Result | Competition |
|---|---|---|---|---|---|---|
| 1. | 30 July 2011 | Korman Stadium, Port Vila, Vanuatu | Solomon Islands | 2–0 | 2–0 | Friendly |
| 2. | 7 November 2015 | Korman Stadium, Port Vila, Vanuatu | Fiji | 1–0 | 1–1 | Friendly |
| 3. | 12 December 2017 | Port Vila Municipal Stadium, Port Vila, Vanuatu | Tuvalu | 1–0 | 10–0 | 2017 Pacific Mini Games |
| 4. | 12 December 2017 | Port Vila Municipal Stadium, Port Vila, Vanuatu | Tuvalu | 2–0 | 10–0 | 2017 Pacific Mini Games |
| 5. | 12 December 2017 | Port Vila Municipal Stadium, Port Vila, Vanuatu | Tuvalu | 3–0 | 10–0 | 2017 Pacific Mini Games |
| 6. | 12 December 2017 | Port Vila Municipal Stadium, Port Vila, Vanuatu | Tuvalu | 10–0 | 10–0 | 2017 Pacific Mini Games |
| 7. | 15 December 2017 | Port Vila Municipal Stadium, Port Vila, Vanuatu | Solomon Islands | 1–0 | 3–2 | 2017 Pacific Mini Games |
| 8. | 18 March 2019 | Lawson Tama Stadium, Honiara, Solomon Islands | Solomon Islands | 1–1 | 1–3 | Friendly |
| 9. | 15 June 2024 | VFF Freshwater Stadium, Port Vila, Vanuatu | Solomon Islands | 1–0 | 1–0 | 2024 OFC Men's Nations Cup |

== Honours ==
Vanuatu

- OFC Nations Cup runner-up: 2024
- Pacific Mini Games gold medalist: 2017

Individual

- OFC Men's Nations Cup Bronze Ball: 2024
