= Bong Kalo =

Ni-Vanuatu footballer

Personal information
- Full name: Bong Kalo
- Date of birth: 18 January 1997 (age 29)
- Place of birth: Tanna, Tafea Province, Vanuatu
- Height: 1.70 m (5 ft 7 in)
- Position: Midfielder

Team information
- Current team: ABM Galaxy

Senior career*
| Years | Team | Apps | (Gls) |
| 2012–2017 | Tafea | | (3) |
| 2017 | Ascona | 8 | (1) |
| 2018 | Nalkutan | 7 | (2) |
| 2019 | Lautoka | | |
| 2019- | ABM Galaxy | 5 | (4) |

International career^{‡}
| 2013 | Vanuatu U17 | 4 | (0) |
| 2014–2017 | Vanuatu U20 | 10 | (4) |
| 2015–2019 | Vanuatu U23 | 12 | (4) |
| 2015– | Vanuatu | 27 | (4) |
Medal record
Men's football
Representing Vanuatu
OFC Nations Cup
| Runner-up | 2024 Fiji/Vanuatu |
OFC U-20 Championship
| Runner-up | 2014 Fiji |
| Runner-up | 2016 Tonga/Vanuatu |
Pacific Mini Games
| Gold medal – first place | 2017 Vanuatu |
- * Club domestic league appearances and goals as of 1 December 2017 ‡ National team caps and goals as of 12 October 2024

Bong Kalo (born 18 January 1997) is a Ni-Vanuatu footballer who plays as a midfielder for Port Vila Premier League club, ABM Galaxy, and the Vanuatu national football team.

== Early career ==
Kalo was born in the Port Vila suburb of Fresh Water 5. He started playing at Wan Smol Bag Futsal court. When he was 12 he joined Teouma Academy, the national football academy of Vanuatu.

== Club career ==
=== Tafea ===
Kalo joined Tafea in 2012. From the beginning he was an important member of the team winning several trophies with the club. He featured in the OFC Champions League twice, in 2014 and 2015. He played 6 matches in the Champions League in which he scored one goal, a penalty kick in a 3–1 loss to AS Magenta from New Caledonia.

=== Ascona ===
After Kalo played well at the 2017 FIFA U-20 World Cup he was linked with several European pro-clubs. In August 2017 he went on trial with Spanish outfit CD Leganés. He impressed because Leganés decided to offer him a longer stay at the club but it was an offer without a contract. After Kalo had also been linked with clubs in Italy, Switzerland (Lugano), Germany (Borussia Dortmund) and New Zealand (Wellington Phoenix), he signed a contract with the amateur club FC Ascona in the Swiss 2. Liga Interregional.

=== Nalkutan ===
In January 2018, Kalo joined Vanuatuan club Nalkutan to play for them in the 2018 OFC Champions League. He scored 2 goals in 7 matches in the continental tournament.

=== Lautoka ===
On January 4, 2019, it was announced that Bong Kalo would join Fijian club, Lautoka to play in the 2019 OFC Champions League.

=== ABM Galaxy F.C. ===
After playing in Fiji, he returned to Vanuatu to play for ABM Galaxy He scored 4 goals in 5 matches in 2019 Port Vila FA Cup, helping Galaxy to be 2019 PVFA Cup runner-up.

== International career ==
=== Youth ===
In 2013 Kalo was called up to play in the 2013 OFC U-17 Championship on home soil. 1–1 draws against Papua New Guinea and Fiji, a 2–1 loss against New Zealand, and two 3–1 victories against the Cook Islands and New Caledonia were not enough to top the group and to qualify for the 2013 FIFA U-17 World Cup.

In 2014 Kalo was called up to join the Vanuatu national under-20 football team in the 2014 OFC U-20 Championship. In this tournament he scored two goals in five matches. One goal in a 4–0 victory over American Samoa and the other goal in a 2–2 draw against Fiji. He also played in the other three matches: a 1–0 win over New Caledonia, a 0–0 draw against local rivals the Solomon Islands and a 4–2 victory over Papua New Guinea. Vanuatu became second behind Fiji who went to the 2015 FIFA U-20 World Cup in New Zealand.

In 2016 Kalo was named captain of the U20's for the 2016 OFC U-20 Championship on home soil. Kalo scored one goal during this tournament, a stunning volley in a 3–1 win during the group stage against Papua New Guinea. He also played in the other group matches: 1–0 victories against Fiji and New Caledonia. Vanuatu advanced to the semi-final and thanks to a late goal scored by Frederick Massing, assisted by Kalo, they won 2–1 against the Solomon Islands. In the final they went down 5–0 against New Zealand but they qualified for the U-20 World Cup. In March 2015 FIFA had decided that the OFC would get two slots at every FIFA U-20 and U-17 World Cup. This meant that Vanuatu had qualified for the 2017 FIFA U-20 World Cup in South Korea.

It was the first time that Vanuatu had qualified for a FIFA world event. In 2017 Bong Kalo and his team participated in the FIFA U-20 World Cup in South Korea, Kalo was named captain and scored his first goal against Mexico in their first ever World Cup tournament. A brilliant finish from a through ball by teammate Ronaldo Wilkins. They lost the match to Mexico by 3–2. Kalo went on to score two more goals, including a fantastic free-kick against Germany, however they lost that match 3–2 as well.

In 2015 Kalo was called up to play with the Vanuatu U23's in the Pacific Games. This was a very good tournament for Vanuatu. They defeated the Federated States of Micronesia with 46 goals to nil. The news of this monster victory went viral, and for one day Vanuatu was world news. Vanuatu eventually reached the final but they lost again against Fiji after a penalty shoot out. So Fiji qualified for the 2016 Summer Olympics.

=== Senior ===
Kalo made his debut for the Vanuatu national football team on November 7, 2015, in a 1–1 draw against Fiji. In 2016 Kalo was part of Vanuatu's squad for the 2016 OFC Nations Cup. This tournament was a disappointment for Kalo and his teammates after they were eliminated in the Group Stage.

Kalo scored his first senior international goal in the final of the 2017 Pacific Mini Games. He scored the game-winner in the 67th minute as Vanuatu defeated the Solomon Islands 3–2.

=== International goals ===
Scores and results list Vanuatu's goal tally first.

| No. | Date | Venue | Opponent | Score | Result | Competition |
|---|---|---|---|---|---|---|
| 1. | 15 December 2017 | Port Vila Municipal Stadium, Port Vila, Vanuatu | Solomon Islands | 3–2 | 3–2 | 2017 Pacific Mini Games |
| 2. | 15 July 2019 | National Soccer Stadium, Apia, Samoa | Tonga | 2–0 | 14–0 | 2019 Pacific Games |
| 3. | 27 March 2024 | King Abdullah Sports City Reserve Stadium, Jeddah, Saudi Arabia | Brunei | 1–0 | 2–3 | 2024 FIFA Series |
| 4. | 12 October 2024 | Freshwater Stadium, Port Vila, Vanuatu | Samoa | 4–1 | 4–1 | 2026 FIFA World Cup qualification |

== Honours ==
Tafea

- VFF National Super League : 2013, 2014
- Port Vila Shield: 2013 2014
- PVFA Cup: 2014

Vanuatu

- OFC Nations Cup: Runner-up, 2024
- Pacific Mini Games: Gold Medalist, 2017

Vanuatu U20

- OFC U-20 Championship: Runner-up, 2014, 2016
