= Varona F.C. =

Association football club in Vanuatu

Varona FC
- Full name: Varona Football Club
- Ground: Port Vila Municipal Stadium; Port Vila, Vanuatu
- Capacity: 6,500
- League: Port Vila Football League
Home colours

Varona Football Club is a Ni-Vanuatu football association that participates in the Port Vila Football League. Varona FC finished in 9th place in the PVFA League - Second division in 2016.
