= Port Vila Shield =

- Founded: 2013
- Region: Vanuatu
- Teams: 8
- Most championships: Tafea FC

The Port Vila Shield is an association football competition held for football clubs in the country of Vanuatu. It was founded in 2013 and is run by the Port Vila Football Association. The shield acts as a pre-season competition, where TVL Premier League clubs play against each other in a cup format.

== Winners ==
- 2013 - Tafea FC
- 2014 - Tafea FC
- 2015 - Amicale FC

== See also ==
- VFF National Super League
- Sport in Vanuatu
