= Pango Green Bird F.C. =

Association football club in Vanuatu

Pango Green Bird
- Full name: Pango Green Bird Football Club
- Ground: Korman Stadium; Port Vila, Vanuatu
- Capacity: 5,000
- League: Port Vila Football League

Pango Green Bird FC is a Vanuatu football team based in Port Vila, in the Republic of Vanuatu.
