= Mauriki F.C. =

Association football club in Vanuatu

- Full name: Mauriki Football Club
- Ground: Port Vila Municipal Stadium; Port Vila, Vanuatu
- Capacity: 6,500
- Manager: Frank King
- League: Port Vila Football League
- 2024–25: 3rd

Mauriki is an association football club from Mele Village, Vanuatu.

In 2015 Mauriki were champions of the TVL First Division and they promoted to compete in the 2015–16 Port Vila Premier League.

== Honours ==
- TVL First Division
  - Winner (1): 2014–15
