= Seveners United F.C. =

Association football club in Vanuatu

Seveners United
- Full name: Seveners United Football Club
- Ground: Korman Stadium; Port Vila, Vanuatu
- Capacity: 5,000
- League: Port Vila First Division
- 2016: 2nd

Seveners United FC is a Vanuatu football team based in Port Vila. They have played in the Port Vila Football League.
