= ABM Galaxy F.C. =

Association football club in Vanuatu

ABM Galaxy
- Full name: Au Bon Marche Galaxy Football Club
- Founded: 2014
- Ground: Port Vila Municipal Stadium
- Capacity: 6,500
- Owner: Andrew Leong
- Coach: Moise Poida
- League: Port Vila Premier League
- 2024–25: Champions
| Home colours | Away colours |

ABM Galaxy FC, known fully as Au Bon Marche Galaxy, is a semi-professional association football club based in Port Vila, Vanuatu, founded in 2014.

Since its formation, the club has enjoyed a rapid rise through the ranks of Vanuatuan football, having won the Second Division in 2014–15, the First Division in 2017–18, and the top division at the first attempt in 2018–19.

== History ==
The first reports of a club under the name ABM Galaxy existing in the nation's capital date back to March 2015, confirming their participation in the 2014–15 Port Vila Second Division, the lowest level of football in the capital. The side won that season's competition, and earned promotion to the Port Vila First Division.

In 2016, the club took part in the 2016 PVFA Cup, a warm-up competition ahead of the new season. The club reached the semi-finals. The club proceeded to finish fourth in the 2016 First Division, and then 6th in the 2017 edition.

In the middle of the 2017–18 season, the club signed three players from the Solomon Islands. The club went on to win the division and earn promotion to the 2018–19 Port Vila Premier League.

In the 2018–19 season, the club finished second in the regular season table behind Tafea FC. This qualified them for the "Top 4 Competition", and they met Tafea once again in the final. Galaxy won 2–1, qualifying for the 2019–20 OFC Champions League.

== Honours ==
=== Domestic ===
- Port Vila Premier League
  - Champions: 2018–19
- Port Vila First Division
  - Champions: 2017–18
- Port Vila Second Division
  - Champions: 2014–15
- VFF National Super League Grand Final
  - Runners-up: 2018–19

== Current squad ==
Squad for the 2022 OFC Champions League

Note: Flags indicate national team as defined under FIFA eligibility rules; some limited exceptions apply. Players may hold more than one non-FIFA nationality.

| No. | Pos. | Nation | Player |
|---|---|---|---|
| 1 | GK | (Vanuatu) VAN | Joshua Willie |
| 3 | DF | (Vanuatu) VAN | Jacob Karaelulu |
| 4 | DF | (Vanuatu) VAN | Goshen Donna |
| 5 | DF | (Vanuatu) VAN | Lency Philip |
| 6 | MF | (Vanuatu) VAN | Dondy Kileteir |
| 7 | FW | (Vanuatu) VAN | Vira Jack |
| 8 | MF | (Vanuatu) VAN | Jayson Timatua |
| 9 | FW | (Vanuatu) VAN | Andre Batick |
| 10 | FW | (Vanuatu) VAN | Anthony Peli |
| 11 | MF | (Vanuatu) VAN | Bong Kalo |

| No. | Pos. | Nation | Player |
|---|---|---|---|
| 12 | MF | (Brazil) BRA | Roberson |
| 13 | DF | (Vanuatu) VAN | Evaristo Kapalu |
| 14 | MF | (Vanuatu) VAN | Joe Moses |
| 15 | MF | (Vanuatu) VAN | Sandy Wilson |
| 16 | MF | (Vanuatu) VAN | Yvong Wilson |
| 17 | MF | (Vanuatu) VAN | Enock James |
| 20 | DF | (Vanuatu) VAN | Selwyn Vatu |
| 23 | MF | (Vanuatu) VAN | Octave Meltecoin |
| 24 | FW | (Vanuatu) VAN | Kensi Tangis (captain) |
| 30 | GK | (Vanuatu) VAN | Francis Aiviji |

=== Current technical staff ===
| Position | |
|---|---|
| Head coach | (Vanuatu) Moise Poida |

== Higher topscorer ==
Kensi Tangis
| Detail | PVPL | FA Cup | Super Four | OFC | Total |
| Goals | 66 | 4 | 12 | 5 | 87 |
| Hat-tricks | 2 | | | | 2 |
| Topscorer | 4 | | | | 4 |
