= Korman Stadium =

Sports stadium in Port Vila, Vanuatu

Coordinates: 17.733909°S 168.337374°E

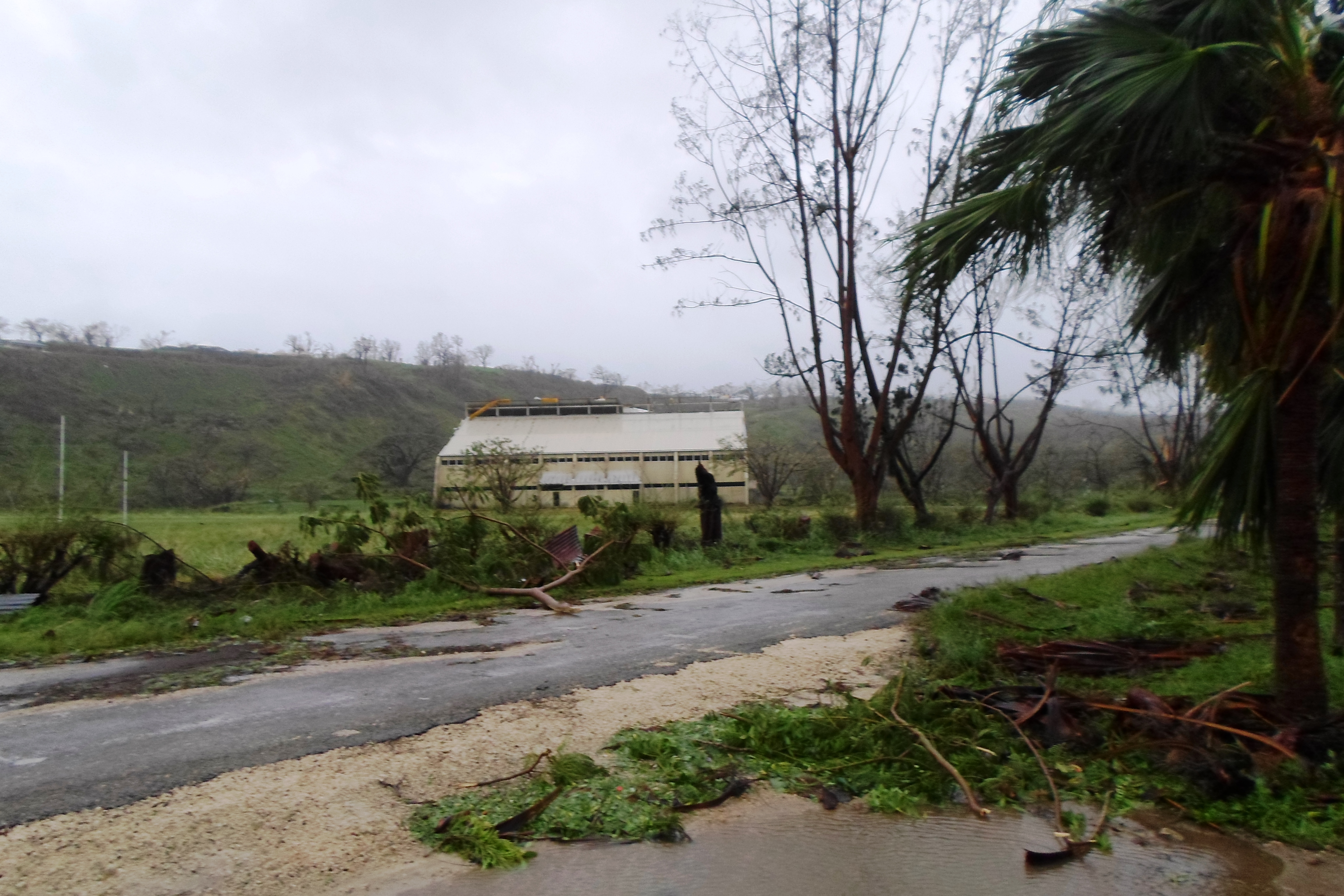
Korman Stadium after Cyclone Pam, March 2015

Korman Stadium is a sports stadium located in Port Vila, in the Island nation of Vanuatu, in the South Pacific Ocean. It is the national stadium and the home of the Vanuatu national football team. The stadium's capacity is 6,500. Korman Stadium was named for one of Vanuatu's politicians, the head of the Vanuatu Republican Party, Maxime Carlot Korman. Amical FC used the stadium for home games.

The sports complex that houses the stadium also includes the Vanuatu Cricket Ground.
