= Mauwia F.C. =

Association football club in Vanuatu

Mauwia
- Full name: Mauwia Football Club
- Founded: 1981
- Ground: Port Vila Municipal Stadium; Port Vila, Vanuatu
- Capacity: 6,500
- League: Port Vila First Division
- 2016: 1st (promoted)

Mauwia is an association football club from Vanuatu that plays in the Port Vila First Division of the Port Vila Football League.

== History ==
In 2016 Mauwia won the 2016 PVFA First Division and gained promotion to the Port Vila Premier League for the first time in the club's history.
