= Sia-Raga F.C. =

Association football club in Vanuatu

Sia-Raga
- Full name: Sia-Raga Football Club
- Founded: 30 July 1980
- Ground: Port Vila Municipal Stadium; Port Vila, Vanuatu
- Capacity: 6,500
- Manager: Lexa Bule
- League: Port Vila Football League

Sia-Raga is an association football club from Port Vila, Vanuatu. The club plays in the Port Vila Football League, considered as the highest tier of football in Port Vila and Vanuatu.

== History ==
Sia-Raga promoted to the highest tier of the Port Vila football league after they were the runners up of the 2014–15 TVL First Division. This was the first time that the runner up of that league also promoted. This was because the competition was extended to 9 teams instead of 8.
