= Yatel F.C. =

Association football club in Vanuatu

Yatel
- Full name: Yatel Football Club
- Ground: Korman Stadium; Port Vila, Vanuatu
- Capacity: 5,000
- Chairman: Glen Hoey
- Manager: Kiki Hinge
- League: Port Vila Football League
- 2024: 11th
Home colours

iCount Yatel Football Club is a Ni-Vanuatu association football team based in Port Vila. They were formerly known as Yatel FC and play in the Port Vila Football League.

In October 2025 they defeated Ifira Black Bird to win the Vanuatu Made Shield.
