= Erakor Golden Star F.C. =

Association football club in Vanuatu

- Full name: Erakor Golden Star Football Club
- Nickname: EGS
- Founded: 1926
- Ground: Port Vila Municipal Stadium; Port Vila, Vanuatu
- Capacity: 6,500
- Manager: (Vanuatu) Kalo Noel Benjamin
- League: Port Vila Premier League
- 2024: 7th
Home colours

Erakor Golden Star F.C. is a Vanuatuan football team based in Port Vila. Their motto is 'Yesu Iwi' which means God is good.

They play in the Port Vila Premier League, the Port Vila's top football competition. In 2016 they became champions, which meant that they qualified for the OFC Champions League for the first time in the history of the club.

== Achievements ==
- Port Vila Football League
  - Winners: 2016
  - Runners-up: 2012–13, 2013–14, 2014–15

Previous champions 1977, 1978, 1980, 1987, 1988, 1989 participated in the French Cup (Coupe de France) in 1977 in Noumea New Caledonia and in Tahiti in 1978.
