= Shepherds United F.C. =

Association football club in Vanuatu

- Full name: Shepherds United Football Club
- Ground: Port Vila Municipal Stadium; Port Vila, Vanuatu
- Capacity: 6,500
- League: First Division (II)
- 2024: 5th

Shepherds United is an association football club from Port Vila, Vanuatu. Formed in the 1980s, it is a club affiliated to the Port Vila Football Association and currently plays in the league's First Division after being relegated from the Premier division in the 2015–16 season. In 1988 the club won the double of league and Independence cup under Coach Terry O'Donnell, who was later to become Vanuatu's National Coach.

== Honours ==
Port Vila Football League:

- Winners (1): 1988
- Runners-up (2): 2002, 2003
