= Tupuji Imere F.C. =

Association football club in Vanuatu

- Full name: Tupuji Imere Football Club
- Nickname: Rainbow Boys
- Ground: Port Vila Municipal Stadium; Port Vila, Vanuatu
- Capacity: 6,500
- Chairman: (Vanuatu) Philip Malas
- Manager: (Vanuatu) David Chillia
- League: Port Vila Football League
- 2024–25: 6th

Tupuji Imere FC is a Vanuatuan football team based in Port Vila. Besides football, the club also has a basketball team and a futsal team named Tupuji Ambassadors. The basketball team plays in the Port Vila Women's Basketball League.

They play in the Telekom Vanuatu Premier League or Port Vila Football League, the country's top football competition. Tupuji Imere Football club is the only club in Vanuatu who still maintain their position in the Premier League since the start in 1980.

== Honours ==
- LBF Cup
  - Winners (1): 2002
- PVFA Cup
  - Winners (1): 2016
- Port Vila Football League
  - Champions (2): 1975, 2017–18
  - Runners-up (1): 2007
