= Amicale F.C. =

Association football club in Vanuatu

Digicel Amicale
- Full name: Digicel Amicale Football Club
- Nickname: Red Rooster(s)
- Founded: 1929
- Dissolved: August 2019
- Ground: Port Vila Municipal Stadium; Port Vila, Vanuatu
- Capacity: 6,500
- Chairman: Andrew Leong
- Manager: Jean Robert Yelou
- League: Port Vila Premier League
- 2018–19: 4th
Home colours	Away colours

Amicale FC (for sponsorship reasons also Digicel Amicale FC) was an association football club from Port Vila, Vanuatu. They played in the highest level in Vanuatu, the Premia Divisen. The club has reached and lost the finals of the 2010–11 and 2013–14 OFC Champions League, both times against Auckland City. They were sponsored by Digicel Vanuatu and Hyundai Motor Company.

In August 2019, the club disbanded due to a fine of 6,000 Swiss francs imposed by FIFA in connection with the FIFA Transfer Matching System.

== Honours ==
- Vanuatu National Soccer League: 4

2010, 2011, 2012, 2015

- Port Vila Premier League (Regional): 6

2009–10, 2010–11, 2011–12, 2012–13, 2013–14, 2014–15

== Performance in OFC competitions ==
- OFC Champions League: 6 appearances

2010–11: Finalist
2011–12: Group stage
2012–13: Semi-final
2013–14: Finalist
2014–15: Group stage
2015–16: Group stage

== Final staff ==
Position	Name
President	(Vanuatu) Andrew Leong
Technical director	(Australia) Anthony Pisano
Head coach	(Vanuatu) Jean Robert Yelou
Team manager	(Vanuatu) Kalo Seule
Media officer	(Vanuatu) Harry Atisson
Goalkeeper coach	(New Caledonia) Jean Yves Galinie
Physio	(Vanuatu) George Regenvanu
Kitman	(Vanuatu) Roddy Lenga

== Former players ==
- (Nigeria) Sanni Issa
- (Italy) Giorgio Bertacchi
- (Italy) Mauro Boerchio
- (Italy) Marco Nasali
- (Italy) Francesco Perrone
- (Italy) Michele-Emanuele Crazia
- (Serbia) Marko Milivojevic
- (New Zealand) Ian Hogg
- (Australia) Scott Gannon
- (Brazil) Diego Benedito Galvão Máximo
- (Scotland) Colin Marshall
- (England) Adam Dickinson
- (Argentina) Miguel Angel Magnoni
- (Argentina) Gaspar Félix Lezcano
- (Switzerland) Carlo Polli
- (Fiji) Osea Vakatalesau

== Former coaches ==
- (Italy) Marco Banchini
- (Italy) Mauro Bertoni
