= Ifira Black Bird F.C. =

Association football club in Vanuatu

Ifira Black Bird
- Full name: Ifira Black Bird Football Club
- Founded: 1918; 108 years ago
- Ground: Port Vila Municipal Stadium; Port Vila, Vanuatu
- Capacity: 6,500
- League: Port Vila Football League
- 2024–25: 2nd

Ifira Black Bird is a professional association football club from the island of Ifira in the southwest of Vanuatu. Ifira is one of the top clubs in the Port Vila Football League.

== Honours ==
- Port Vila Football League
  - Champions (3): 2017, 2020, 2022
- PVFA Cup
  - Runners-up (1): 2014
- VVF National Super League
  - Champions (1): 2022
