= Port Vila Municipal Stadium =

Stadium in Vanuatu

- Interactive map of Port Vila Municipal Stadium
- Location: Port Vila
- Capacity: 10,000
- Event: Sports

Tenants
- Vanuatu United (OFCPL) (2026–present)

Port Vila Municipal Stadium is a sports stadium located in Port Vila, Vanuatu. It is the main stadium for the Port Vila Football Association's TVL League and it is the home of OFC Professional League club Vanuatu United

== See also ==
- List of rugby league stadiums by capacity
