= Tafea F.C. =

Association football club in Vanuatu

Tafea Football Club
- Full name: Tafea Football Club
- Ground: Port Vila Municipal Stadium; Port Vila, Vanuatu
- Capacity: 6,500
- Manager: (Vanuatu) Robert Calvo
- League: Port Vila Football League
- 2024: 9th
Home colours

Tafea Football Club is an association football team from Port Vila in Vanuatu.

Tafea won the first 15 championships from the start of the Premia Divisen of the Port Vila Football League between 1994 and 2008–09, a world record for the most domestic titles in a row (the streak was broken by Amicale in the league's 16th season). The team also reached the final of the 2001 Oceania Club Championship Tournament, where it lost out to Australia's Wollongong Wolves.

== Achievements ==
- Vanuatu National Soccer League: 4

2005, 2009, 2013, 2014

- Port Vila Football League: 16

1994, 1995, 1996, 1997, 1998, 1999, 2000, 2001, 2002, 2003, 2004, 2005, 2006, 2007, 2008–09, 2018–19

== Performance in OFC competitions ==
- OFC Champions League: 9 appearances

Best: 2nd place in 2001
1987: 6th place
1999: 5th place
2001: 2nd place
2005: 3rd place
2006: 5th place
2007–08: 4th place
2009–10: 5th place
2013–14: 9th place
2014–15: 8th place

== Former coaches ==
- (France) Marcel Mao
