= Moise Poida =

Vanuatuan footballer and manager (born 1979)

Personal information
- Date of birth: 2 April 1979 (age 47)
- Place of birth: Vanuatu
- Height: 5 ft 8 in (1.73 m)
- Positions: Midfielder; winger

Senior career*
Years	Team	Apps	(Gls)
2001–2015	Tafea	?	(?)

International career
1996–2008	Vanuatu	21	(3)

Managerial career
- 2011–2013: Vanuatu U20
- 2012–2016: Tafea
- 2015: Vanuatu U23
- 2015–2016: Vanuatu
- 2017–2018: Nalkutan
- 2018–2022: Ifira Black Bird
Medal record
Men's football
Representing Vanuatu (as player)
Pacific Games
Bronze medal – third place	2007 Samoa
Representing Vanuatu (as manager)
Pacific Mini Games
Gold medal – first place	2017 Vanuatu
- * Club domestic league appearances and goals

Moise Poida (born 2 April 1979) is a Vanuatuan football manager and former player. He manages the Vanuatu men's national team and has been a former manager of club side Tafea. Poida has also managed the Vanuatu men's under-20 national team and Vanuatu men's under-23 national team. As a player, Poida made 21 appearances for the national team and scored three goals as a winger and midfielder. At club level, he played for Tafea F.C. for his entire career. In 2008 Poida played for an Oceanian representative side against a team that included members of France's 1998 FIFA World Cup winning team. The game included players such as Zinedine Zidane, Christian Karembeu and Robert Pires.

== Playing career ==
=== Club career ===
Poida made his senior football debut in 2001 for Tafea F.C. Playing primarily as a midfielder and winger, he played for the club until the 2014–15 season. He won ten league titles in his time at Tafea F.C. with the first coming in the 2001 season.

=== International career ===
Poida's first inclusion in the national team squad was in June 2001 for the first round of OFC qualification for the 2002 FIFA World Cup. He made his international football debut on 4 June 2001, playing the entire match in a 6–1 loss against Tahiti. Poida scored his first international goal for Vanuatu on 12 May 2004, in an OFC first round qualification match for the 2006 FIFA World Cup against American Samoa. Poida was substituted on for Lorry Thompsen in the 55th minute and scored immediately, making the scoreline 4–1 in a match that Vanuatu won 9–1. Poida scored his second and third goals for his country at the 2007 South Pacific Games, with the first coming in the 66th minute of a 4–0 win against Samoa and the second coming in the 19th minute of a 15–0 win against American Samoa. In total, Poida played 23 games for the national team and he scored three goals. His last international match was in 2008 where the Vanuatuan's won 2–1 against Fiji.

=== Karembeu Jubilee ===
On 31 May 2008 an exhibition match was played at Stade Numa-Daly Magenta in Noumea, New Caledonia to celebrate the career of Christian Karembeu, a New Caladonia-born footballer who made 53 appearances for France. Poida played in a team representing Oceania against a team of members of France's squad that won the 1998 FIFA World Cup. The French team included players such as Zinedine Zidane, Robert Pires, Bixente Lizarazu, Laurent Blanc and Frank Leboeuf. Karembeu played minutes for both teams. The French won the game 8–2 with Pires scoring five, Zidane two and Youri Djorkaeff one for the French while Victor Zeoula and Karembeu scored for the Oceanians. After the game Poida said, "I have only dreamed of a moment like this – it will live with me forever." The president of the Vanuatu Football Federation Lambert Maltock said, "I was very emotional to see Moise out there. Everybody knows who Moise is all the kids love him and one day he could be the Vanuatu national team coach. It was a big thrill for everybody to see a Vanuatu player on the same pitch as Zidane, Karembeu, Lebeouf."

=== International goals ===
Scores and results list Vanuatu's goal tally first.

No	Date	Venue	Opponent	Score	Result	Competition
1.	12 May 2004	National Soccer Stadium, Apia, Samoa	American Samoa	5–1	9–1	2006 FIFA World Cup qualification
2.	25 August 2007	National Soccer Stadium, Apia, Samoa	Samoa	3–0	4–0	2007 South Pacific Games
3.	29 August 2007	National Soccer Stadium, Apia, Samoa	American Samoa	1–0	15–0	2007 Pacific Games

== Managerial career ==
=== Tafea ===
Poida was appointed manager of his former club Tafea in 2012. In his first season in charge, Tafea F.C. finished third in the Port Vila Football League and qualified for the 2013 VFF National Super League, a competition between the top clubs in Vanuatu's regional leagues. Poida's Tafea F.C. won the competition beating Amicale F.C. 1–0 in the final. In the 2013–14 season Poida was suspended for three months of the 2013–14 season and was replaced for that period by Jerry Napat. Poida's team finished third in the Port Villa Premier League and therefore qualified for the 2014 VFF National Super League. Tafea F.C. won the 2014 VFF National Super League, again beating Amicale F.C. in the final, this time 3–1. Poida's team also competed 2013–14 OFC Champions League where they finished third in their group and didn't progress to the knockout rounds. In Poida's third season in charge, Tafea F.C. finished fourth in the Port Vila Football League and qualified for the 2015 VFF National Super League. In the VFF National Super League Tafea F.C. competed in group C and finished third in the group. They did not advance from the group stage. Poida's team also competed in the 2014–15 OFC Champions League where they finished third in their group and therefore did not advance to the knockout rounds. In December 2016, Poida announced that he would leave his position at Tafea to pursue other ambitions.

=== Vanuatu ===
Poida was appointed the manager of the Vanuatu national team in October 2015, replacing Percy Avock. Poida's first game in charge was a friendly against Fiji on 7 November 2015 and the team drew 1–1. His team played another friendly against the same team three days later and they won 2–1.

Poida's first major international tournament was the 2016 OFC Nations Cup. Vanuatu were drawn in group B along with New Zealand, Fiji and the Solomon Islands. In their first match they lost to the Solomon Islands 1–0 with Solomon Islander Jerry Donga scoring the only goal in the 19th minute. Vanuatu's second game was against New Zealand who had won their opening game 3–1. New Zealand won the match 5–0. Vanuatu's final group match was against the Fijians. This match was the only match Vanuatu won at the tournament with goals from Dominique Fred, Fenedy Masauvakalo and Brian Kaltack securing a 3–2 win. After all the group B fixtures were completed New Zealand finished top with nine points. Vanuatu, Solomon Islands and Fiji all finished on three points. Solomon Island's goal difference of −1 was better than Fiji's −2 and Vanuatu's −5 so they finished second. This meant that Poida's team was eliminated from the competition and that they finished last in their group.

== Honours ==
=== Player ===
Vanuatu

- Pacific Games: Bronze Medalist, 2007

=== Manager ===
Vanuatu

- Pacific Mini Games: Gold Medalist, 2017
