= Marko Milivojevic (footballer) =

Serbian footballer

Personal information
- Date of birth: February 8, 1988 (age 38)
- Place of birth: Belgrade, Yugoslavia
- Height: 1.83 m (6 ft 0 in)
- Position: Goalkeeper

Youth career
- Red Star Belgrade

Senior career*
Years	Team	Apps	(Gls)
- Policajac
- Posavac
- Sopot
- PKB Padinska Skela
2012–2013	Skënderbeu	1	(0)
2013–2014	Luftëtari	7	(0)
2015	Amicale		
2020-2023	Kosmaj Ralja		
2023-	Komgrap		
- * Club domestic league appearances and goals

Marko Milivojevic (born 8 February 1988 in Belgrade, Yugoslavia) is a Serbian football goalkeeper.

== Career ==
=== Serbia and Albania ===
In his native Serbia, Milivojevic played for a host of lower-league clubs- Policajac, FK Posavac, Sopot, and FK PKB. Then, he plied his trade for Albanian clubs Skenderbeu and Luftetari for three years in total.

=== Vanuatu ===
Receiving a call from manager Lazar Mitic to play in Vanuatu in 2015, Milivojevic immediately accepted the offer, allured by the possibility of living in a tropical island. Once he got there, the goalkeeper was placed in a five-star resort and signed with Port Vila Premier League championship contenders Amicale F.C., mixing with three Serbians, three Italians, one Fijian, two Argentinians, and one Swiss. The contract was for three months, ending after the 2014-15 OFC Champions League. Targeting their first OFC Champions League title in 2015, Milivojevic was one of numerous foreign players signed for that reason but the club were unable to make it past the group stage, losing to Auckland City FC 3-0 after beating Suva and Western United. With Amicale, the Serbian reaped all domestic honors for the season, winning the domestic league, the domestic cup, and the 2015 Grand Casino Cup, surviving Cyclone Pam which devastated Vanuatu in March 2015 with few structures remaining extant.
