= 2020 VFF National Super League =

VFF National Super League
- Season: 2020

The 2020 VFF National Super League is the 10th edition of the VFF National Super League, the highest tier football league in Vanuatu apart from Port Vila. The group stage is scheduled to start in October 2019.

== Northern Qualifiers ==
=== Luganville ===
==== League table ====
2019 Luganville Premier League

==== Luganville Top 3 ====
The Top 3 teams from 2019 Luganville Premier League played against each other for two spots in semifinals

- Sia-Raga
- Malampa Revivors
- Vaum United

Pos	Team	Pld	W	D	L	GF	GA	GD	Pts	Qualification
1	Malampa Revivors (Q)	2	1	1	0	5	3	+2	4	Qualification to National Super League
2	Vaum United	2	1	1	0	4	3	+1	4	
3	Sia-Raga	2	0	0	2	2	5	−3	0	

(Q) Qualified for the phase indicated
19 October 2019
14:00

Malampa Revivors	3-1	Sia-Raga

Luganville Soccer City Stadium
22 October 2019
14:00

Sia-Raga	1-2	Vaum United

Luganville Soccer City Stadium
26 October 2019
14:00

Malampa Revivors	2-2	Vaum United

Luganville Soccer City Stadium

Malampa Revivors qualified for VFF National Super League.

=== Malampa ===
==== Semi-finals ====
- Police vs Lenuk
- Atsal (6) 3-3 (5) Uripiv

==== Final ====
Police 5-3 Atsal

Police qualified for National Super League

=== Penama ===
Penama FA Qualifier is scheduled to be held between 14 and 18 October 2019.

==== Group stage ====
The 8 teams were split in two groups with four teams each.

===== Group A =====
Pos	Team	Pld	W	D	L	GF	GA	GD	Pts	Qualification or relegation
1	AFC (Q)	2	2	0	0	2	0	+2	6	Qualified to Semifinals
2	All Reds (Q)	2	1	0	1	2	1	+1	3	Qualified to Semifinals
3	Arato	2	0	0	2	0	3	−3	0	

Updated to match(es) played on 17 October 2019. Source: "VFF NSL – Penama Qualifier". Archived from the original on 18 October 2019.
(Q) Qualified for the phase indicated

====== Results ======
Home \ Away	AFC	ALL	ARA
AFC	—	1–0	1–0
All Reds		—	2–0
Arato			—

Updated to match(es) played on 17 October 2019. Source:
Legend: Blue = home team win; Yellow = draw; Red = away team win.
For upcoming matches, an "a" indicates there is an article about the rivalry between the two participants.

===== Group B =====
Pos	Team	Pld	W	D	L	GF	GA	GD	Pts	Qualification or relegation
1	Rue Rue (Q)	2	2	0	0	8	2	+6	6	Qualified to Semifinals
2	LTT (Q)	2	1	0	1	5	3	+2	3	Qualified to Semifinals
3	Green United	2	0	0	2	2	10	−8	0	

Updated to match(es) played on 17 October 2019. Source: "VFF NSL – Penama Qualifier". Archived from the original on 18 October 2019.
(Q) Qualified for the phase indicated

====== Results ======
Home \ Away	RUE	GRE	LTT
Ruerue	—	6–1	2–1
Green United		—	1–4
LTT			—

Updated to match(es) played on 17 October 2019. Source:
Legend: Blue = home team win; Yellow = draw; Red = away team win.
For upcoming matches, an "a" indicates there is an article about the rivalry between the two participants.

==== Semi-finals ====
AFC 0-3 LTT
RueRue 1-0 All Reds

==== Third-place match ====
AFC 0-1 All Reds

==== Final ====
RueRue (4) 2-2 (2) LTT

RueRue qualified for 2020 VFF National Super League

=== Sanma ===
6 teams from Sanma Football Association played the qualifier for the VFF National Super League

==== Group stage ====
===== Group A =====
Pos	Team	Pld	W	D	L	GF	GA	GD	Pts	Qualification or relegation
1	Patuvuti (Q)	2	2	0	0	10	1	+9	6	Qualified to Semifinals
2	Kole (Q)	2	1	0	1	3	7	−4	3	Qualified to Semifinals
3	Black Snail	2	0	0	2	3	8	−5	0	

Updated to match(es) played on 13 September 2019. Source: "VFF NSL – Sanma Qualifier". Archived from the original on 18 October 2019.
(Q) Qualified for the phase indicated

====== Results ======
Home \ Away	PAT	KOL	BLA
Patuvuti	—	5–0	5–1
Kole	-	—	3–2
Black Snail	-	-	—

Updated to match(es) played on 13 September 2019. Source:
Legend: Blue = home team win; Yellow = draw; Red = away team win.
For upcoming matches, an "a" indicates there is an article about the rivalry between the two participants.

===== Group B =====
Pos	Team	Pld	W	D	L	GF	GA	GD	Pts	Qualification or relegation
1	Suara (Q)	2	2	0	0	8	1	+7	6	Qualified to Semifinals
2	Blue River (Q)	2	0	1	1	3	8	−5	1	Qualified to Semifinals
3	Young Star	2	0	1	1	2	4	−2	1	

Updated to match(es) played on 13 September 2019. Source: "VFF NSL – Sanma Qualifier". Archived from the original on 18 October 2019.
(Q) Qualified for the phase indicated

====== Results ======
Home \ Away	SUA	BLU	YOU
Suara	—	6–1	2–0
Blue River	-	—	2–2
Young Star	-	-	—

Updated to match(es) played on 13 September 2019. Source:
Legend: Blue = home team win; Yellow = draw; Red = away team win.
For upcoming matches, an "a" indicates there is an article about the rivalry between the two participants.

==== Semi-finals ====
Patuvuti 1-0 Blue River
Suara 3-1 Kole

==== Final ====
Patuvuti 4-2 Suara

Patuvuti qualified for National Super League

=== Torba ===
9 teams from Torba Football Association played the qualifier for the VFF National Super League

==== Group stage ====
===== Group A =====
- Magde
- Kings United
- Agape
- Amicale Sola
- Waterfall

Magde 5-1 Waterfall

===== Group B =====
- Nere
- Sigal
- Ambasodor
- Tanmet

Nere 8-0 Tanmet

==== Semi-finals ====
Nere 2-1 Magde
Waterfall vs Unknown

==== Final ====
Nere 1-2 Waterfall

Waterfall qualified for National Super League

== Southern Qualifiers ==
=== Shefa ===
==== Efaté Play-off ====
===== South Efaté League =====
Eraniao was crowned champion of South Efate League and qualified for Efaté Playoff

===== North Efaté League =====
Kings was crowned champion of North Efate League and qualified for Efaté Playoff

====== Results ======
Kings vs Eraniao - 11 November
Eraniao vs Kings - 13 November

==== Epi Top 4 ====
Four teams from Epi Football League play the Top 4.

Pos	Team	Pld	W	D	L	GF	GA	GD	Pts	Qualification or relegation
1	Green Corner	3	3	0	0	5	2	+3	9	Qualified to Shefa Champions League
2	Milo	3	1	1	1	5	4	+1	4	
3	Nuvi	3	1	1	1	5	4	+1	4	
4	Nikaura	3	0	0	3	4	9	−5	0	

Updated to match(es) played on 18 October 2019. Source: "VFF NSL – Shefa Qualifier". Archived from the original on 18 October 2019.

===== Results =====
Home \ Away	MIL	NIK	NUV	GRE
Milo	—	4–2	0–0	1–2
Nikaura		—	2–4	0–1
Nuvi			—	1–2
Green Corner				—

Updated to match(es) played on 18 October 2019. Source:
Legend: Blue = home team win; Yellow = draw; Red = away team win.
For upcoming matches, an "a" indicates there is an article about the rivalry between the two participants.

=== Tafea ===
==== Tafea Qualifier ====
Four teams from Tafea Football Association played the Tafea Qualifier. LL Echo qualified for 2020 VFF National Super League

Pos	Team	Pld	W	D	L	GF	GA	GD	Pts	Qualification or relegation
1	LL Echo	3	2	1	0	8	1	+7	7	Qualified to 2020 VFF Group Stage
2	Lili	3	2	1	0	5	1	+4	7	
3	Nalkutan	3	1	0	2	3	4	−1	3	
4	Medics	3	0	0	3	2	12	−10	0	

Updated to match(es) played on 27 September 2019. Source: "VFF NSL – Tafea Qualifier". Archived from the original on 18 October 2019.

===== Results =====
Home \ Away	LIL	MED	NAL	LLE
Lili	—	3–0	1–0	1–1
Medics	-	—	2–3	0–6
Nalkutan	-	-	—	0–1
LL Echo	-	-	-	—

Updated to match(es) played on 27 September 2019. Source:
Legend: Blue = home team win; Yellow = draw; Red = away team win.
For upcoming matches, an "a" indicates there is an article about the rivalry between the two participants.

== National Super League ==
=== Qualified Teams ===
Province (or city)	Association	Team(s)
Luganville	Luganville Football Association	Malampa Revivors
Malampa Province	Malampa Football Association	Police
Penama Province	Penama Football Association	RueRue
Port Vila	Port Vila Football Association	
Sanma Province	Sanma Football Association	Patuvuti
Shefa Province	Shefa Football Association	
Tafea Province	Tafea Football Association	LL Echo
Torba Province	Torba Football Association	Waterfall

== See also ==
- 2019–20 Port Vila Premier League
