= Lenuk FC =

Association football club in Vanuatu

- Full name: Lenuk Football Club
- Founded: 1978
- Manager: (Vanuatu) Obed Jimmy
- League: VFF National Super League
- 2016: Group Stage

Lenuk FC is a Vanuatuan football team based in Weso, Malakula Island. Besides football, the club also has a futsal team. The club plays in the Malekula Premier League.

== History ==
Lenuk FC is founded in 1978 by Pastor George Kanu from Ifira. They play in blue and white.

== 2016 ==
In 2016 they qualified for the 2016 VFF National Super League for the first time. Though they lost all of their 4 group games against Malampa Revivors, Rainbow, Eastland and Rangers. After the tournament four players joined Vanuatu top club Shepherds United: Sison Joshua, Greg Vetkon, Klensly Jayvie and Timothy Bila

== Honours ==
Unknown
