= 2013–14 Port Vila Premier League =

2013–14 TVL Premier League
- Season: 2013–14
- Champions: Amicale FC
- Relegated: Yatel FC
- Matches: 56
- Top goalscorer: (Nigeria) Sanni Issa (Vanuatu) Bernard Daniel (7 goals)
- Highest scoring: Amicale FC 6–0 Yatel FC

The 2013–14 TVL Premier League or 2013–14 Port Vila Premier League is the 20th season of the Port Vila Premier League top division.

The top four of the league qualify for the 2014 VFF National Super League.

The season lasted from October 18, 2013 to March 22, 2014.

Amicale FC were the champions and Yatel FC relegated to the 2014–15 TVL First Division.

== Teams ==
- Amicale FC
- Erakor Golden Star
- Ifira Black Bird
- Shepherds United
- Spirit 08
- Tafea FC
- Tupuji Imere
- Yatel FC

== Standings ==
Pos	Team	Pld	W	D	L	GF	GA	GD	Pts	Qualification or relegation
1	Amicale FC	14	9	3	2	35	10	+25	30	Advance to the 2014 VFF National Super League
2	Erakor Golden Star	14	8	5	1	25	17	+8	29	Advance to the 2014 VFF National Super League
3	Tafea FC	14	7	4	3	20	11	+9	25	Advance to the 2014 VFF National Super League
4	Spirit 08	14	7	3	4	24	18	+6	24	Advance to the 2014 VFF National Super League
5	Tupuji Imere	14	5	3	6	19	18	+1	18	
6	Ifira Black Bird	14	4	2	8	21	26	−5	14	
7	Shepherds United	14	2	3	9	12	23	−11	9	
8	Yatel FC	14	2	1	11	7	40	−33	7	Relegated to the 2014–15 TVL First Division

Updated to match(es) played on 7 February 2014. Source:
Rules for classification: 1) points; 2) goal difference; 3) number of goals scored.

== Rounds ==
=== Round 1 ===
18 October 2013
15:00

Tafea	2–0	Tupuji Imere
Kevin Shem 12'; Joseph Namariau 75'

Korman Stadium, Port Vila
Referee: Malakai Nisak

19 October 2013
11:00

Erakor Golden Star	2–0	Shepherds United
Tony Kaltack 10'; Jacky Rueben 72'

Korman Stadium, Port Vila
Referee: Alick Lukai

19 October 2013
13:00

Amicale	1–2	Ifira Black Bird
Robert Thomas 29'		Nicky Nikau 30'; Keroni Napaukarana 85'

Korman Stadium, Port Vila
Referee: Malachai Nisak

19 October 2013
15:00

Spirit 08	4–0	Yatel
Leo Moli 5'; Bernard Daniel 10'; Sylvain Tenene 38'; Selwyn Sese 84'

Korman Stadium, Port Vila
Referee: George Bruce

=== Round 2 ===
25 October 2013
15:00

Amicale	2–0	Shepherds United
Fenedy Masauvakalo 47'; Robert Thomas 65'

Korman Stadium, Port Vila

26 October 2013
11:00

Spirit 08	1–1	Tupuji Imere
Didier Kalip 30'; Rodney Serveux 74'		Willie Leeman 4'; Malon Kaltanak 60'

Korman Stadium, Port Vila

26 October 2013
13:00

Erakor Golden Star	1–1	Ifira Black Bird
Nemani Roqara 27'		Andrew Chichirua 30'

Korman Stadium, Port Vila

26 October 2013
15:00

Tafea	2–1	Yatel
Joseph Namariau 53', 75'		Noel Masing 89'

Korman Stadium, Port Vila

=== Round 3 ===
1 November 2013
15:00

Erakor Golden Star	3–2	Spirit 08
Kerson Kalsong 30'; Nemani Roqara 41'; Jack Niko 80'		Oweni Siehi 52'; Leo Moli 60'

Korman Stadium, Port Vila

2 November 2013
11:00

Amicale	2–1	Tupuji Imere
Daniel Natou 31', 68'		Malon Kaltanak 12'

Korman Stadium, Port Vila

2 November 2013
13:00

Tafea	1–0	Ifira Black Bird
Moses Kalotang 84'

Korman Stadium, Port Vila

2 November 2013
15:00

Shepherds United	0–0	Yatel

Korman Stadium, Port Vila

=== Round 4 ===
8 November 2013
15:07

Tupuji Imere	1–0	Yatel
Keith Hinge 89'

Korman Stadium, Port Vila

9 November 2013
11:20

Shepherds United	2–1	Ifira Black Bird
Richard Ben 48'; Willie Takaro 80'		Winjio William 85'

Korman Stadium, Port Vila

9 November 2013
13:15

Amicale FC	4–2	Spirit 08
Fenedy Masauvakalo 35', 65', 72'; Samuela Kautoga 52'		Bernard Daniel 55'; Silvain Tenene 62'

Korman Stadium, Port Vila

9 November 2013
15:05

Erakor Golden Star	2–1	Tafea
Kersom Kalsong 38'; Jackson Tasso 67'		Dalong Damilip 75'

Korman Stadium, Port Vila
Referee: Mahit Chilia

=== Round 5 ===
15 November 2013
15:00

Shepherds United	2–3	Spirit 08
Albert Fred 35'; Danny Michel 50'	Report	Bernard Daniel 40', 60'; Silvain Tenene 47'

Korman Stadium, Port Vila

16 November 2013
11:00

Erakor Golden Star	2–0	Yatel
Jason Thomas 2'; Kersom Kalsong 77'	Report

Korman Stadium, Port Vila

16 November 2013
13:00

Tupuji Imere	1–3	Ifira Black Bird
Keith Hinge 88'		(o.g.) Jean Pierre 67'

Korman Stadium, Port Vila

16 November 2013
15:00

Tafea	0–2	Amicale
	Report	Sanni Issa 32', 87'

Korman Stadium, Port Vila

=== Round 6 ===
22 November 2013
15:00

Erakor Golden Star	3–2	Tupuji Imere
Tony Kaltack 11', 81'; Kersom Kalsong 33'	Report	Willie Leeman 41'; Rodney Serveux 45'

Korman Stadium, Port Vila

23 November 2013
11:00

Ifira Black Bird	1–2	Spirit 08
Semu Levi 65'	Report	Bernard Daniel 26'; Leo Moli 30'

Korman Stadium, Port Vila

23 November 2013
13:00

Amicale	5–0	Yatel
Fenedy Masauvakalo 24', 33'; Jeffery Bule 55'; Sanni Issa 66'; Jean Nako Naprapol 88'	Report

Korman Stadium, Port Vila

23 November 2013
15:00

Tafea	1–1	Shepherds United
Jason Botleng 90'	Report	Ivong August 6'

Korman Stadium, Port Vila

=== Round 7 ===
6 December 2013
15:00

Ifira Black Bird	6–0	Yatel
Winsio William 11'; Solomon Kalsakau 12'; Kaltalipo Taiwia 16', 45'; Jean Pierre 40'; Bill Korikalo 83'	Report

Korman Stadium, Port Vila

7 December 2013
11:00

Tafea	0–1	Spirit 08
	Report	Silvain Tenene 38'

Korman Stadium, Port Vila

7 December 2013
13:00

Amicale	4–0	Erakor Golden Star
Sanni Issa 41', 78', 89'; Nelson Sale Kilifa 85'	Report

Korman Stadium, Port Vila

7 December 2013
15:00

Tupuji Imere	3–1	Shepherds United
Willie Leman 31'; Kaltack Chilia 47'; Rodney Serveux 52'		Erick Ismael 61'

Korman Stadium, Port Vila

=== Round 8 ===
31 January 2014
15:15

Yatel	3–2	Ifira Black Bird
Pedro Matal 10'; Alex Saniel 25', 70'	Report	Jean Pierre 41'; Steve Kara 83'

Korman Stadium, Port Vila

1 February 2014
11:10

Spirit 08	0–2	Tafea
		Bong Kalo 15'; Nicol Tari 75'

Korman Stadium, Port Vila

1 February 2014
13:00

Erakor Golden Star	2–1	Amicale
Remy Kalsrap 30'; Jacky Ruben 63'	Report	Dominique Fred 83'

Korman Stadium, Port Vila

1 February 2014
15:00

Shepherds United	1–2	Tupuji Imere
Ken Kalo 60'		Don Mansale 21', 30'

Korman Stadium, Port Vila

=== Round 9 ===
7 February 2014
15:00

Tafea	1–1	Tupuji Imere
Alista Kalip 41'	Report	Rodney Serveux 10'

Korman Stadium, Port Vila

8 February 2014
11:15

Erakor Golden Star	1–1	Shepherds United
Jacky Ruben 35'	Report	Ernie Timakata 10'

Korman Stadium, Port Vila

8 February 2014
13:15

Amicale	3–0	Ifira Black Bird
Dominque Fred 9', 18'; Kensi Tangis 27'	Report

Korman Stadium, Port Vila

8 February 2014
15:00

Spirit 08	0–1	Yatel
	Report	Frank Ruben 57'

Korman Stadium, Port Vila

=== Round 10 ===
14 February 2014
15:00

Amicale	3–1	Shepherds United
François Sakama 12'; Sanni Issa 68'; Kensi Tangis 70'	Report	Richard Ben 45'

Korman Stadium, Port Vila

15 February 2014
11:00

Tupuji Imere	0–1	Spirit 08
	Report	Leo Moli 18'

Korman Stadium, Port Vila

15 February 2014
13:00

Erakor Golden Star	2–2	Ifira Black Bird
Kersom Kalsong 6'; Tony Kaltack 80'	Report	Bong Magnawim 16'; Keroni Napaukarana 25'

Korman Stadium, Port Vila

15 February 2014
15:00

Yatel	1–4	Tafea
Frank Ruben 85'	Report	Bong Kalo 8'; Joseph Namariau 20'; Dalong Damilip 22'; Robert Tasso 70'

Korman Stadium, Port Vila

=== Round 11 ===
21 February 2014
13:00

Erakor Golden Star	2–2	Spirit 08
Tony Kaltack 16'; Loic 68'	Report	Leo Moli 13'; Bernard Daniel 35'

Korman Stadium, Port Vila

21 February 2014
15:00

Tupuji Imere	1–1	Amicale
Rodney Serveux 82'	Report	François Sakama 43'

Korman Stadium, Port Vila

22 February 2014
13:00

Tafea	4–1	Ifira Black Bird
Bong Kalo; Nicol Tari; Robert Tasso

Korman Stadium, Port Vila

22 February 2014
15:00

Yatel	0–1	Shepherds United

Korman Stadium, Port Vila

=== Round 12 ===
28 February 2014
15:00

Yatel	0–3	Tupuji Imere
		Rodney Serveux 9'; Don Mansale 20'; Maxime Malas 83'

Korman Stadium, Port Vila

29 February 2014
11:00

Ifira Black Bird	2–1	Shepherds United
Keroni Napaukarana 20'; Semu Levi 43'		Yvong August 2'

Korman Stadium, Port Vila

29 February 2014
13:00

Amicale	1–1	Spirit 08
François Sakama 67'	Report	Rickie Tari 35'

Korman Stadium, Port Vila

29 February 2014
15:00

Tafea	0–0	Erakor Golden Star

Korman Stadium, Port Vila

=== Round 13 ===
7 March 2014
15:00

Spirit 08	1–0	Shepherds United
Oweni Siehi 16'

Korman Stadium, Port Vila

8 March 2014
11:00

Erakor Golden Star	4–1	Yatel
Jack Wanemut 8'; Tony Kaltack 55'; Kalserei Arson 56'; Loic 85'		Justin Koka 35'

Korman Stadium, Port Vila

8 March 2014
13:00

Ifira Black Bird	0–2	Tupuji Imere
		Elony Roberts 17'; Rodney Serveux 39'

Korman Stadium, Port Vila

8 March 2014
15:00

Amicale	0–0	Tafea
	Report

Korman Stadium, Port Vila

=== Round 14 ===
15 March 2014
11:00

Ifira Black Bird	0–3	Spirit 08
		Leo Moli 26'; Ricki Tari 63'; Didier Kalip 85'

Korman Stadium, Port Vila

15 March 2014
13:15

Tupuji Imere	0–1	Erakor Golden Star
		Remy Kalsrap 45'

Korman Stadium, Port Vila

15 March 2014
15:20

Tafea	2–1	Shepherds United
Zica Manuhi 53'; Alista Kalip 83'		Willie Kalo 20'

Korman Stadium, Port Vila

22 March 2014
15:00

Amicale	6–0	Yatel

Korman Stadium, Port Vila

== Goal scorers ==
Rank	Player	Club	Goals
1	(Vanuatu) Bernard Daniel	Spirit 08	7
1	(Nigeria) Sanni Issa	Amicale	7
3	(Vanuatu) Rodney Serveux	Tupuji Imere	6
3	(Vanuatu) Tony Kaltack	Erakor Golden Star	6
3	(Vanuatu) Fenedy Masauvakalo	Amicale	6
6	(Vanuatu) Leo Moli	Spirit 08	5
6	(Vanuatu) Kersom Kalsong	Erakor Golden Star	5
8	(Vanuatu) Joseph Namariau	Tafea	4
8	(Vanuatu) Sylvain Tenene	Spirit 08	4
10	(Vanuatu) Jacky Ruben	Erakor Golden Star	3
10	(Vanuatu) Dominique Fred	Amicale	3
10	(Vanuatu) François Sakama	Amicale	3
10	(Vanuatu) Bong Kalo	Tafea	3
10	(Vanuatu) Keroni Napaukarana	Ifira Black Bird	3
10	(Vanuatu) Jean Pierre	Ifira Black Bird	3
10	(Vanuatu) Willie Leeman	Tupuji Imere	3
10	(Vanuatu) Don Mansale	Tupuji Imere	3
