= John Alick =

Ni-Vanuatu footballer

Personal information
- Full name: John Alick
- Date of birth: 25 April 1991 (age 35)
- Place of birth: Luganville, Espiritu Santo, Vanuatu
- Position: Midfielder

Team information
- Current team: PNG Hekari
- Number: 17

Senior career*
Years	Team	Apps	(Gls)
2010–2015	Malampa Revivors		
2015–2016	Hekari United		
2016–2017	Malampa Revivors		
2017	Erakor Golden Star		
2017–2025	Solomon Warriors		
2025–	PNG Hekari		

International career
2017–	Vanuatu	26	(2)
Medal record
Men's football
Representing Vanuatu
OFC Nations Cup
Runner-up	2024 Fiji/Vanuatu
Pacific Mini Games
Gold medal – first place	2017 Vanuatu
MSG Prime Minister's Cup
Runner-up	2026 Fiji
Third place	2023 New Caledonia
- * Club domestic league appearances and goals

John Alick (born 25 April 1991) is a Ni-Vanuatu professional footballer who plays as a midfielder for PNG Hekari in the Papua New Guinea Premier Soccer League and the Vanuatu national football team.

== Club career ==
Alick was born on the island of Espiritu Santo, the largest island in Vanuatu. In 2010 he joined the newly founded club Malampa Revivors. With the club he reached in 2015 the final of the 2015 VFF National Super League after winning in the semi-final against Ifira Black Bird. In the final they lost by 3 goals to nil against Amicale. However, for the 2017 OFC Champions League the OFC decided that Vanuatu got two spots instead of one. So in March 2017 Malampa Revivors was the first non-Port Vila club to play in the OFC Champions League. Alick was part of the team, however it was not his first Champions League experience, because in 2016 he joined PNG outfit Hekari United to play with them in the 2016 OFC Champions League. After the 2017 Champions League Alick joined the Solomon Warriors in the summer. With the club he won the 2017, 2018 and 2019–20 Solomon Islands S-League. He played again for the Warriors in the 2020–21 season. Alick won the 2019-20 Telekom S-League Player of the Season Award in February 2020. He won the award again in 2023.

== National team ==
For a long time Alick was not a part of the Vanuatu national football team. However, in 2017 he got a call up for a friendly game in and against the Solomon Islands. Alick played the full 90 minutes on that 28 July 2017 in a game that ended in a 0 all draw. In November he was called up for the game against Estonia and for the 2017 Pacific Mini Games.

== Honours ==
Vanuatu

- OFC Nations Cup: Runner-up, 2024
- Pacific Mini Games: Gold Medalist, 2017
- MSG Prime Minister's Cup: Runner-Up, 2026; 3rd place, 2023

Individual

- OFC Professional League Team of the Season: 2026 (substitute)
