= 2019 VFF National Super League =

VFF National Super League
- Season: 2019
- Champions: Malampa Revivors
- OFC Champions League: Malampa Revivors

The 2019 VFF National Super League is the 9th edition of the VFF National Super League, the highest tier football league in Vanuatu apart from Port Vila. Most games took place at the 10,000-capacity Port Vila Municipal Stadium, the 6,500-capacity Korman Stadium and the 6,000-capacity Luganville Soccer Stadium.

== First stage ==
=== Northern Region ===
==== Luganville Top 3 ====
The Top 3 teams from 2018 Luganville Premier League played against each other for two spots in Semifinals

- Santos FC (Luganville)
- Malampa Revivors (Luganville)
- Vaum United (Luganville)

Pos	Team	Pld	W	D	L	GF	GA	GD	Pts	Qualification
1	Vaum United (Q)	2	2	0	0	10	3	+7	6	Qualification to Final stage
2	Malampa Revivors (Q)	2	1	0	1	7	7	0	3	Qualification to Final stage
3	Santos FC	2	0	0	2	3	10	−7	0	

(Q) Qualified for the phase indicated
12 June 2019
14:00

Vaum United	6-0	Santos FC
Sam Rai 8', 77', 87'; John Damelip 32', 41'; Dalong Damalip 76'

Luganville Soccer City Stadium
Attendance: 20
Referee: Joel Hopken
15 June 2019
14:00

Malampa Revivors	4-3	Santos FC
Michel Soksok 31', 37', 87'; Dondy Kileteir 67'		Jerry Lum 16'; Remy Avock 45'; Presley Alick 57'

Luganville Soccer City Stadium
Attendance: 40
Referee: Kevin Teuliere
15 June 2019
14:00

Malampa Revivors	3-4	Vaum United
Claude Aru 35', 85', 89'		Ritchie Ravo 3'; John Damelip 9'; George Vuti 64'; Sam Rai 88'

Luganville Soccer City Stadium
Attendance: 400
Referee: Kevin Teuliere

Malampa Revivors and Vaum United advanced to semifinals

=== Southern Region ===
GROUP D: Eastern Nesia (Tafea), Nuvi (Shefa), Fatukei (Shefa), Milo (Shefa)
GROUP E: Fenua Temanu Bakou (Shefa), Medics FC (Tafea), LL Echo (Tafea), Lewelkas (Tafea)

The two winners are qualified for semifinals

GROUP D: Eastern Nesia (Tafea)
GROUP E: Fenua Temanu Bakou (Shefa)

== Final stage ==
=== Teams ===
Four teams from the seven Vanuatu football associations (other than Port Vila) qualified, with two from the Northern Region and two from the Southern Region.

- Eastern Nesia (Southern Region)
- Fenua Temanu Bakou (Southern Region)
- Malampa Revivors (Northern Region)
- Vaum United (Northern Region)

=== Semi-finals ===
24 June 2019
13:00

Fenua Temanu Bakou	2–2 (a.e.t.)	Vaum United
Kamega Kalsakau 14'; Torick Saurei 57'		Bethuel Ollie 52'; Jonah Avock 60'
Penalties
	4–3

Korman Stadium
Attendance: 1,000
Referee: Lensley Kwiri
24 June 2019
16:00

Malampa Revivors	3–0	Eastern Nesia
Andre Batick 49'; Tasso Jeffrey 73'; Michel Soksok 77'

Luganville Soccer City Stadium
Attendance: 1,500
Referee: Joel Hopken

=== Final ===
Winner of the Final qualifies for the 2020 OFC Champions League group stage and the 2019 VFF National Super League grand final.

26 June 2019
16:00

Fenua Temanu Bakou	1–2	Malampa Revivors
Unknown		Edwin Bai; Unknown

Korman Stadium
Referee: Joel Hopken

== Grand final ==
The 2019 VFF National Super League Grand Final is played between two teams:

Team	Qualifying method
Malampa Revivors	2019 VFF National Super League final stage winners
Galaxy	2018–19 PVFA Top Four Super League winners

Both teams had already qualified for the 2020 OFC Champions League by winning their respective competitions. The Grand Final decides the seeding of the two teams in the OFC Champions League, with the winner seeded as Vanuatu 1 and the runner-up seeded as Vanuatu 2.

29 June 2019
15:00

Malampa Revivors	3–1	Galaxy
Andre Batick; Edwin Bai; Claude Aru		Kensi Tangis

Korman Stadium
Referee: Joel Hopken

== Grand Final clubs' stadiums ==
Team	Location	Stadium	Capacity
ABM Galaxy F.C.	Port Vila	Port Vila Municipal Stadium	10,000
Malampa Revivors F.C.	Luganville	Luganville Soccer Stadium	6,000

== See also ==
- 2018–19 Port Vila Premier League
