= Mauro Boerchio =

Italian professional footballer

Personal information
- Date of birth: 16 August 1989 (age 37)
- Place of birth: Broni, Italy
- Height: 1.95 m (6 ft 5 in)
- Position: Goalkeeper

Youth career
- –2007: Nocerina

Senior career*
Years	Team	Apps	(Gls)
2007–2008	Renate		
2008–2011	Bari	0	(0)
2009	→ Lecco (loan)		
2010	→ Pro Sesto (loan)		
2011–2013	Verbano		
2013–2014	Savona	2	(0)
2015–2016	Amicale		
2016–2017	Gzira United	8	(0)
2017	Ulaanbaatar City		
2018	Maziya S&RC		
2018–2019	NEROCA	6	(0)
2019	→ Chennai City (loan)	4	(0)
- * Club domestic league appearances and goals as of 09:15, 17 February 2019 (UTC)

Mauro Boerchio (born 16 August 1989) is an Italian professional footballer who plays as a goalkeeper.

== Career ==
=== Vanuatu ===
Agreeing to an offer from Vanuatuan giants Amicale in February 2015 and making his debut in the 2015 Port Vila Shield, Boerchio helped them do well in the domestic cup and Premier League, mixing with Vanuatuans as well as fellow Italians, Argentineans, Serbians, South Americans, two New Zealanders, a Scotsman, and a couple Swiss throughout his stay there. During his first season with Amicable, the Broni native won the league with the team, participating in the OFC Champions League also.

Temporarily relocated to Australia following Cyclone Pam, which hit Vanuatu in 2015.

=== Malta ===
Accepting a contract with Gzira United of the Maltese Premier League in November 2016, Boerchio was released early by the club after failing to impress the coach.

=== Mongolia ===
Alongside Federico Zini, Boerchio sealed a move to Ulaanbaatar City of the Mongolian Premier League in 2017. There, he was lionized by the media and featured in various commercials.

=== Maldives ===
Took up a contract with Maziya S&RC of the Maldivian Dhivehi Premier League for the 2018 season.

=== India ===
On 18 August 2018, I-League club NEROCA FC announced the signing of Boerchio, who rejoined his former Ulaanbaatar City coach, Manuel Retamero Fraile.

On 14 February 2019, Boerchio was loaned out to Chennai City as a replacement for the injured Nauzet Santana.

== Honours ==
Chennai City

- I-League: 2018–19
