= 2018 VFF National Super League =

Tournament details
- Host country: Vanuatu

The 2018 VFF National Super League is the 8th edition of the VFF National Super League, the highest tier football league in Vanuatu apart from Port Vila. The matches were played between 22 and 31 March 2018 at Luganville Soccer City Stadium.

== Teams ==
Province (or city)	Association	Team(s)
Luganville	Luganville Football Association	Malampa Revivors; Vaum United
Penama Province	Penama Football Association	Concord
Shefa Province	Shefa Football Association	Malnaruru
Tafea Province	Tafea Football Association	Medics
Malampa Province	Malampa Football Association	none
Sanma Province	Sanma Football Association	none
Torba Province	Torba Football Association	none

== Standings ==
Pos	Team	Pld	W	D	L	GF	GA	GD	Pts	Qualification or relegation
1	Malampa Revivors	4	3	0	1	14	7	+7	9	Qualification to 2019 OFC Champions League and the 2018 VFF National Super League grand final
2	Vaum United	4	3	0	1	12	6	+6	9	
3	Medics	4	2	0	2	10	6	+4	6	
4	Malnaruru	4	2	0	2	5	10	−5	6	
5	Concord	4	0	0	4	6	18	−12	0	

== Grand final ==
The 2018 VFF National Super League Grand Final was played between two teams:

Team	Qualifying method
Malampa Revivors	2018 VFF National Super League winners
Erakor Golden Star	2017–18 PVFA Top Four Super League winners

Both teams had already qualified for the 2019 OFC Champions League by winning their respective competitions. The Grand Final decided the seeding of the two teams in the 2019 OFC Champions League, with the winner seeded as Vanuatu 1 and the runner-up seeded as Vanuatu 2.

9 June 2018

Malampa Revivors	1–1	Erakor Golden Star
Penalties
	5–6

Luganville Soccer Stadium, Luganville

== See also ==
- 2017–18 Port Vila Premier League
