= 2008–09 Port Vila Premier League =

2008–09 TVL Premier League
- Season: 2008–09
- Champions: Tafea
- Relegated: Erakor Golden Star; Ifira Black Bird
- Matches: 56
- Goals: 204 (3.64 per match)

The 2008–09 TVL Premier League or 2008–09 Port Vila Premier League is the 15th season of the Port Vila Premier League top division.

The top five of the league qualify for the 2009 VFF Bred Cup, the national league of Vanuatu.

Tafea FC were champions and Erakor Golden Star and Ifira Black Bird relegated to the 2009–10 TVL First Division.

== Teams ==
- Amicale FC
- Erakor Golden Star
- Ifira Black Bird
- Seveners United
- Tafea FC
- Tupuji Imere
- Westtan Broncos
- Yatel FC

== Standings ==
Pos	Team	Pld	W	D	L	GF	GA	GD	Pts	Qualification or relegation
1	Tafea FC (C)	14	11	2	1	43	9	+34	35	Qualified for the 2009–10 OFC Champions League
2	Amicale FC (Q)	14	9	2	3	33	16	+17	29	Advance to the 2009 VFF Bred Cup
3	Tupuji Imere (Q)	14	6	5	3	29	24	+5	23	Advance to the 2009 VFF Bred Cup
4	Yatel FC (Q)	14	6	4	4	24	15	+9	22	Advance to the 2009 VFF Bred Cup
5	Seveners United (Q)	14	4	3	7	21	29	−8	15	Advance to the 2009 VFF Bred Cup
6	Westtan Broncos	14	4	2	8	20	36	−16	14	
7	Erakor Golden Star	14	4	1	9	19	33	−14	13	Relegated to the 2009–10 TVL First Division
8	Ifira Black Bird	14	2	1	11	15	42	−27	7	Relegated to the 2009–10 TVL First Division

Updated to match(es) played on 16 October 2015. Source:
Rules for classification: 1) points; 2) goal difference; 3) number of goals scored.
(C) Champions; (Q) Qualified for the phase indicated
