= Rodney Lava =

Vanuatu footballer

Personal information
- Full name: Rodney Anthony Lava
- Date of birth: 16 July 2003 (age 23)
- Place of birth: Vanuatu
- Position: Forward

Team information
- Current team: Lautoka
- Number: 17

Senior career*
Years	Team	Apps	(Gls)
2022–2025	M3 United		
2025–	Lautoka	4	(2)

International career^{‡}
2025–	Vanuatu	0	(0)
- * Club domestic league appearances and goals ‡ National team caps and goals as of 12:24, 17 September 2025 (UTC)

Rodney Lava is a Vanuatuan footballer who plays as a forward for Fiji Premier League club Lautoka and the Vanuatu national team.

== Club career ==
As a youth, Lava played for M3 United. By 2023, he was captaining the senior side in the VFF Champions League. The team defeated Malampa 7–3 in its final Group Stage match with Lava scoring in the fixture. The club were champions of the Tafea FA League in 2025 and earned a spot in the Champions League a second time with Lava a key figure in the squad. The club advanced to the final match, defeating Waterfall FC 3–1 in the semi-finals but were ultimately defeated 1–2 by Galaxy.

In July 2025, Lava and two other Vanuatuan players joined Lautoka of the Fiji Premier League for the remainder of the 2025 season on what was initially a five-month trial following their standout performances in the VFF Champions League earlier that summer. Lava went on to be the only one of the three players who were added to the roster because Lautoka only had one open foreign player roster spot remaining. He made his league debut on matchday 13, scoring two goals in a 4–1 victory over Labasa.

== International career ==
Lava was called up to the senior national team for the first time for the 2025 MSG Prime Minister's Cup. He was the only overseas-based player called up by head coach Richard Iwai for the tournament.
