= 2007 Port Vila Premier League =

2007 TVL Premier League
- Season: 2007
- Champions: Tafea FC
- Relegated: Pango Green Bird
- Matches: 56
- Goals: 232 (4.14 per match)

The 2007 TVL Premier League or 2007 Port Vila Premier League is the 14th season of the Port Vila Premier League top division.

The winner of the league qualify for the 2008 VFF Bred Cup, the national league of Vanuatu.

Tafea FC were champions and Pango Green Bird relegated to the 2008–09 TVL First Division.

== Teams ==
- Amicale FC
- Erakor Golden Star
- Ifira Black Bird
- Pango Green Bird
- Tafea FC
- Tupuji Imere
- Westtan Broncos FC
- Yatel FC

== Standings ==
Pos	Team	Pld	W	D	L	GF	GA	GD	Pts	Qualification or relegation
1	Tafea FC (C)	14	11	1	2	49	11	+38	34	Advance to the 2008 VFF Bred Cup
2	Tupuji Imere	14	11	1	2	47	16	+31	34	
3	Yatel FC	14	9	1	4	38	20	+18	28	
4	Erakor Golden Star	14	6	4	4	27	20	+7	22	
5	Westtan Broncos FC	14	6	2	6	31	28	+3	20	
6	Amicale FC	14	3	1	10	13	41	−28	10	
7	Ifira Black Bird	14	2	2	10	14	44	−30	8	
8	Pango Green Bird	14	1	2	11	15	54	−39	5	Relegated to the 2008–09 TVL First Division

Updated to match(es) played on 16 October 2015. Source:
Rules for classification: 1) points; 2) goal difference; 3) number of goals scored.
(C) Champions
