= Lamenu =

Lamenu Island is in Vanuatu. 'Lamenu' may also be,

- Lamenu language
- Lamenu Stadium
