= 2009–10 Port Vila Premier League =

2009–10 TVL Premier League
- Season: 2009–10
- Champions: Amicale FC
- Relegated: Seveners United; Westtan Broncos FC
- Matches: 55
- Goals: 185 (3.36 per match)

The 2009–10 TVL Premier League or 2009–10 Port Vila Premier League is the 16th season of the Port Vila Premier League top division.

The top five of the league qualify for the 2010 VFF National Super League.

Amicale FC were champions and Seveners United and Westtan Broncos FC relegated to the 2010–11 TVL First Division.

== Teams ==
- Amicale FC
- Seveners United
- Spirit 08
- Tafea FC
- Teouma Academy
- Tupuji Imere
- Westtan Broncos
- Yatel FC

== Standings ==
Pos	Team	Pld	W	D	L	GF	GA	GD	Pts	Qualification or relegation
1	Amicale FC (C)	14	11	3	0	43	8	+35	36	Qualified to the 2010–11 OFC Champions League
2	Tafea FC (Q)	14	9	4	1	31	13	+18	31	Advance to the 2010 VFF National Super League
3	Spirit 08 (Q)	14	6	5	3	24	14	+10	23	Advance to the 2010 VFF National Super League
4	Teouma Academy (Q)	14	6	1	7	16	21	−5	19	Advance to the 2010 VFF National Super League
5	Tupuji Imere (Q)	13	4	3	6	19	36	−17	15	Advance to the 2010 VFF National Super League
6	Yatel FC	14	3	2	9	19	38	−19	11	
7	Seveners United	14	3	1	10	22	35	−13	10	Relegated to the 2010–11 TVL First Division
8	Westtan Broncos	13	2	3	8	11	20	−9	9	Relegated to the 2010–11 TVL First Division

Updated to match(es) played on 16 October 2015. Source:
Rules for classification: 1) points; 2) goal difference; 3) number of goals scored.
(C) Champions; (Q) Qualified for the phase indicated
