= Stuart Kelly =

Stuart Kelly may refer to:

- Stuart Kelly (rugby league) (born 1976), Australian rugby league player
- Stuart Kelly (footballer) (born 1981), Scottish footballer
- Stuart Kelly (literary critic), Scottish critic and author
