= 2013 New Caledonia Super Ligue =

New Caledonia Super Ligue
- Season: 2013
- Champions: Magenta

The New Caledonia Super Ligue 2013 season was the 40th season of the FCF since its establishment in 1962. The champions were chosen to represent the New Caledonia Super Ligue in the 2014–15 OFC Champions League.

== Standings ==
Pos	Team	Pld	W	D	L	GF	GA	GD	Pts	Qualification or relegation
1	Gaïtcha FCN (C)	20	16	0	4	61	27	+34	62 (Note: 6 points deducted.)	2014–15 OFC Champions League group stage
2	Hienghène Sport	20	15	1	4	65	27	+38	57 (Note: 9 points deducted.)	
3	Magenta	20	10	3	7	40	31	+9	53	
4	Lössi	20	10	6	4	50	32	+18	51 (Note: 5 points deducted.)	
5	Mont-Dore	20	7	3	10	39	45	−6	44	
6	Thio Sport	20	12	4	4	45	28	+17	43 (Note: 17 points deducted.)	
7	Ne Drehu	20	7	4	9	34	45	−11	41 (Note: 4 points deducted.)	
8	Qanomo (R)	20	7	6	7	28	27	+1	40 (Note: 7 points deducted.)	Relegation to the 2015 Promotion d'Honneur
9	Wetr	20	6	0	14	35	48	−13	38	
10	Tiga Sport	20	3	0	17	28	64	−36	24 (Note: 5 points deducted.)	
11	Grand Nord (R)	20	3	1	16	27	78	−51	17 (Note: 13 points deducted.)	Relegation to the 2015 Promotion d'Honneur

Source: Soccerway
Rules for classification: 1) Points, 2) Head to head, 3) Goal difference. 4 points for a win, 2 points for a draw, and 1 for a defeat.
(C) Champions; (R) Relegated
