= 2010–11 Port Vila Premier League =

2010–11 TVL Premier League
- Season: 2010–11
- Champions: Amicale FC
- Relegated: Yatel FC
- Matches: 56
- Goals: 196 (3.5 per match)

The 2010–11 TVL Premier League or 2010–11 Port Vila Premier League is the 17th season of the Port Vila Premier League top division.

The top five of the league qualify for the 2011 VFF National Super League.

Amicale FC were champions and Yatel FC relegated to the 2011–12 TVL First Division.

== Teams ==
- Amicale FC
- Ifira Black Bird
- Shepherds United
- Spirit 08
- Tafea FC
- Teouma Academy
- Tupuji Imere
- Yatel FC

== Standings ==
Pos	Team	Pld	W	D	L	GF	GA	GD	Pts	Qualification or relegation
1	Amicale FC (C)	14	12	1	1	41	11	+30	37	Advance to the 2011 VFF National Super League
2	Tafea FC (Q)	14	11	1	2	45	13	+32	34	Advance to the 2011 VFF National Super League
3	Tupuji Imere (Q)	14	8	0	6	29	25	+4	24	Advance to the 2011 VFF National Super League
4	Spirit 08 (Q)	14	7	1	6	21	19	+2	22	Advance to the 2011 VFF National Super League
5	Shepherds United (Q)	14	6	2	6	18	26	−8	20	Advance to the 2011 VFF National Super League
6	Teouma Academy	14	5	3	6	23	21	+2	18	
7	Yatel FC	14	1	1	12	10	36	−26	4	Relegated to the 2011–12 TVL First Division
8	Ifira Black Bird	14	1	1	12	9	45	−36	4	

Rules for classification: 1) points; 2) goal difference; 3) number of goals scored.
(C) Champions; (Q) Qualified for the phase indicated
