= 2013 VFF National Super League =

Tournament details
- Host country: Vanuatu
- Dates: May 23 – June 15, 2013
- Teams: 12 (from 8 associations)
- Venue(s): 2 (in 2 host cities)

Final positions
- Champions: Tafea FC
- Runners-up: Amicale FC

Tournament statistics
- Matches played: 33
- Goals scored: 173 (5.24 per match)

The 2013 VFF National Super League was the qualifying competition for the 2013–14 OFC Champions League.

Tafea FC and Amicale FC both advanced to this tournament as the two Vanuatu representative clubs.

== Teams ==
12 teams will qualify from 8 separate national competitions.

| Association | Qualified Teams | Provinces |
|---|---|---|
| Port Vila Football Association | Amicale FC; Tafea FC; Erakor Golden Star | Port Vila |
| Tafea Football Association | Nalkutan FC; Highlands FC | Tafea Province |
| Shefa Football Association | Malnaruru FC | Shefa Province |
| Luganville Football Association | Santos FC; Siaraga FC | Luganville |
| Torba Football Association | Green Perrut FC | Torba Province |
| Penama Football Association | Blue Rovers FC | Penama Province |
| Sanma Football Association | Western Star FC | Sanma Province |
| Malampa Football Association | Uripiv FC | Malampa Province |

== Rounds ==
=== Northern Region ===
Uripiv FC advanced in first place and Siaraga FC advanced in second place.

==== Round 1 ====
18 May 2013
11:00

| Uripiv FC | 7–1 | Western Star FC |
|---|---|---|
| Octav Meltecoin; Ruben Frank; Frank Rubern; Octav Meltecoin; Loic Bahormal; Edwin Bae; Edwin Bae | | Jacob Berry |

Chapuis stadium, Luganville

18 May 2013
13:10

| Siaraga FC | 2–2 | Blue Rovers FC |
|---|---|---|
| Samsam Liplip; Olsen Gelesi | | Bernard Vira; Austin Tari |

Chapuis stadium, Luganville

| Santos FC | v | Green Perrut FC |

==== Round 2 ====
25 May 2013
11:00

| Blue Rovers FC | 0–4 | Santos FC |
|---|---|---|
| | | Jean Pierre; Lewus; Justin Koka; Sebastien |

Chapuis stadium, Luganville
Referee: Soterio Bernard

25 May 2013
13:00

| Uripiv FC | 2–0 | Siaraga FC |
|---|---|---|
| Ruben Frank; Loic Bahormal |

Chapuis stadium, Luganville
Referee: Nawen Hopkins

25 May 2013
15:00

| Green Perrut FC | 1–5 | Western Star FC |
|---|---|---|
| Bernard Smith | | Wille Tari; Wala Jacob; Joshua Song; Jacob Mike [Own Goal] |

Chapuis stadium, Luganville
Referee: Harry Berry

==== Round 3 ====
25 May 2013
11:00

| Siaraga FC | 10–0 | Western Star FC |

Chapuis stadium, Luganville

25 May 2013
13:00

| Blue Rovers FC | 4–0 | Green Perrut FC |

Chapuis stadium, Luganville

25 May 2013
15:00

| Uripiv FC | 4–2 | Santos FC |

Chapuis stadium, Luganville

==== Round 4 ====
25 May 2013
11:00

| Uripiv FC | 11–0 | Green Perrut FC |
|---|---|---|
| Loic Bahormal (6); Octav Meltecoin; Paul Malsale (2); Harry Saksak; Donna Godsen |

Chapuis stadium, Luganville

25 May 2013
13:00

| Santos FC | 1–2 | Siaraga FC |
|---|---|---|
| Frank Molisale | | Samsam Liplip; Simon Bule |

Chapuis stadium, Luganville

25 May 2013
15:00

| Blue Rovers FC | 2–2 | Western Star FC |

Chapuis stadium, Luganville

=== Southern Region ===
Amicale F.C. advanced in first place and Tafea F.C. advanced in second place.

==== Round 1 ====
18 May 2013
11:00

| Tafea FC | 2–1 | Malnaruru FC |
|---|---|---|
| Alista Kalip 60'; Jayson Botleng | | Michel Coulon |

Korman Stadium, Port Vila
Referee: George Bruce

18 May 2013
13:10

| Erakor Golden Star | 3–0 | Hi-Lands FC |
|---|---|---|
| Jack Niko; Jack Niko; Jackson Tasso |

Korman Stadium, Port Vila
Referee: Alick Lukai

18 May 2013
15:10

| Amicale FC | 3–1 | Nalkutan FC |
|---|---|---|
| Pape Gueye; Daniel Natou; Jack Wetney | | Maika Lava |

Korman Stadium, Port Vila
Referee: Mahit Chilia

==== Round 2 ====
25 May 2013
11:00

| Hi-Lands FC | 1–3 | Nalkutan FC |
|---|---|---|
| Loren Bob | | Jeffery Tess; Jeffery Tess; John Maimai |

Korman Stadium, Port Vila
Referee: Mahit Chilia

25 May 2013
13:00

| Erakor Golden Star | 3–2 | Malnaruru FC |
|---|---|---|
| Abtul Rogara; Tony Kaltak; Jean Kaltak | | Richard Manurik; Harry Michel |

Korman Stadium, Port Vila
Referee: Robinson Banga

25 May 2013
15:00

| Amicale FC | 0–0 | Tafea FC |

Korman Stadium, Port Vila
Referee: George Bruce

==== Round 3 ====
25 May 2013
11:00

| Erakor Golden Star | 1–1 | Nalkutan FC |

Korman Stadium, Port Vila

25 May 2013
13:00

| Amicale FC | 11–0 | Malnaruru FC |

Korman Stadium, Port Vila

25 May 2013
15:00

| Tafea FC | 2–0 | Hi-Lands FC |

Korman Stadium, Port Vila

==== Round 4 ====
25 May 2013
11:00

| Hi-Lands FC | 4–2 | Malnaruru FC |
|---|---|---|
| Jack Iarapia; Richard Iata; Lemani Lolgot; Lemani Lolgot | | Wille August; Robert Baggio |

Korman Stadium, Port Vila
Referee: Robinson Banga

25 May 2013
13:00

| Tafea FC | 5–0 | Nalkutan FC |
|---|---|---|
| Dalong Damilip; Alista Kalip; John Lann; Alista Kalip; Iamak |

Korman Stadium, Port Vila
Referee: Robinson Banga

25 May 2013
15:00

| Amicale FC | 2–1 | Erakor Golden Star |
|---|---|---|
| Kensi Tangis; Fenedy Masauvakalo | | Jean Kaltak |

Korman Stadium, Port Vila
Referee: Mahit Chilia

== Playoffs ==
=== Semi-finals ===
8 June 2013

| Uripiv FC | 0–3 | Tafea FC |

Korman Stadium, Port Vila

=== Grand Final ===
15 June 2013

| Amicale FC | 0–1 | Tafea FC |
|---|---|---|
| | | Joseph Namariau 45' |

Korman Stadium, Port Vila
