= 2017–18 Port Vila Premier League =

TVL Premier League
- Season: 2017–18

The 2017–18 Port Vila Premier League or 2017–18 TVL Premier League is the 24th edition of the Port Vila Premier League, the highest tier football league in Port Vila, Vanuatu. The season started on 8 September 2017.

== Standings ==
Pos	Team	Pld	W	D	L	GF	GA	GD	Pts	Qualification or relegation
1	Tupuji Imere (C)	14	8	4	2	21	10	+11	28	Qualification to PVFA Top Four Super League
2	Erakor Golden Star	14	9	1	4	28	18	+10	28	Qualification to PVFA Top Four Super League
3	Tafea	14	7	4	3	18	11	+7	25	Qualification to PVFA Top Four Super League
4	Ifira Black Bird	14	7	3	4	21	18	+3	24	Qualification to PVFA Top Four Super League
5	Shepherds United	14	7	2	5	22	14	+8	23	
6	Amicale	14	3	6	5	14	16	−2	15	
7	Sia-Raga	14	3	4	7	13	20	−7	13	Relegation play-off
8	Mauwia	14	0	0	14	10	40	−30	0	Relegation to Port Vila First Division

Source: FIFA
(C) Champions

== PVFA Top Four Super League ==
=== Grand Final Qualifier ===
19 May 2018

Tupuji Imere	1–3	Erakor Golden Star

=== Semifinal Qualifier ===
19 May 2018

Tafea	0–0	Ifira Black Bird

==== Replay ====
23 May 2018

Tafea	0–3	Ifira Black Bird

=== Semifinal ===
26 May 2018

Tupuji Imere	1–1 (a.e.t.)	Ifira Black Bird
Penalties
	2–4

=== Grand Final ===
Winner of the Grand Final qualifies for the 2019 OFC Champions League and the 2018 VFF National Super League grand final.

2 June 2018

Erakor Golden Star	2–0	Ifira Black Bird

== See also ==
- 2018 VFF National Super League
