= 2009 VFF Bred Cup =

- Champions: Tafea FC
- Matches played: 12

The 2009 VFF Bred Cup was the qualifying competition for the 2009–10 OFC Champions League.

The club who advanced to this tournament was Tafea FC, Vanuatu's sole representative at the competition. The competition was played in two separate championships, north and south, with each winner facing off in the overall final.

== Northern Championship ==
=== Teams ===
- Vaum United
- Autebule F.C.
- Air Supa
- Rainbow F.C.

=== Semi-finals ===
Vaum United	–	Autebule F.C.

=== Final ===
May 10, 2009

Vaum United	–	Rainbow F.C.

Vaum United advance to the overall final.

== Southern Championship ==
=== Teams ===
- Amicale FC
- Tafea FC
- Kings United
- Sele United (qualifying stage)
- Nalkutan FC

=== Qualifying stage ===
April 26, 2009

Sele United	2–3	Kings United

April 29, 2009

Kings United	–	Sele United

Kings United win on aggregate 3-2*.

=== Semi-finals ===
==== First leg ====
Kings United	1–4	Tafea F.C.

==== Second leg ====
May 5, 2009

Tafea F.C.	–	Kings United

Tafea F.C. win on aggregate 4-1*.

May 6, 2009

Amicale F.C.	0–0	Nalkutan F.C.

Amicale F.C. win on aggregate 3–1.

=== Third-Place Match ===
May 10, 2009

Nalkutan F.C.	4–2	Kings United

=== Final ===
May 10, 2009

Tafea F.C.	3–0	Amicale F.C.

Tafea F.C. advance to the overall final.

- The second-leg score is unknown, so the aggregate only counts the first leg score.

== Overall Final ==
May 16, 2009

Tafea F.C.	4–1	Vaum United

Tafea F.C. qualified for the 2009–10 OFC Champions League.
