= M3 United FC =

- Ground: Lamenu Stadium
- Capacity: 2,000
- Manager: Serom Iati
- League: Tafea FA Championship, VFF Champions League
- 2025: 2nd
- Website: Website

M3 United FC is an association football club from the Tafea, Vanuatu that competes in the VFF Champions League.

== History ==
M3 United FC participated in the VFF Champions League for the first time in 2023. In 2025, the club won the Tafea Football Association championship for the first time with a 2-1 victory over Kapalpal FC in the final. By virtue of the title, M3 United qualified for the VFF Champions League for the second time. That season, the club advanced to the final match, defeating Waterfall FC 3–1 in the semi-finals. The club was ultimately defeated 1–2 by Galaxy.
