= 2011 VFF National Super League =

- Champions: Amicale FC
- Matches played: 20
- Goals scored: 79 (3.95 per match)

The 2011 VFF National Super League was the qualifying competition for the 2011–12 OFC Champions League.

The club who advanced to this tournament was Amicale FC, Vanuatu's sole representative at the competition.

== Teams ==
All 5 teams who competed were the top 5 from the 2010–11 Port Vila Premier League, the top division of football in the Port Vila Football Association (the main football association in Vanuatu).

- Amicale FC
- Tafea FC
- Shepherds United
- Tupuji Imere
- Spirit 08

== Standings ==
Pos	Team	Pld	W	D	L	GF	GA	GD	Pts	Qualification
1	Amicale FC (Q)	8	8	0	0	26	7	+19	24	Qualified for the 2011–12 OFC Champions League
2	Tafea FC	8	5	1	2	25	9	+16	16	
3	Tupuji Imere	8	2	2	4	13	17	−4	8	
4	Spirit 08	8	0	5	3	5	13	−8	5	
5	Shepherds United	8	0	2	6	10	33	−23	2	

Rules for classification: 1) points; 2) goal difference; 3) number of goals scored.
(Q) Qualified for the phase indicated
