= 2016–17 VFF National Super League =

2016 VFF National Super League
Tournament details
- Host country: Vanuatu
- Dates: 2016–17
- Teams: 18 (from 8 associations)

Final positions
- Champions: Nalkutan
- Runners-up: Vaum United

The 2016–17 VFF National Super League is the qualifying competition for the 2018 OFC Champions League.

The 14 teams will be split into two groups of five and one group of four, with the top two from each group qualifying for final round. The winner of the final round will qualify for the 2018 OFC Champions League.

== Teams ==
14 teams will qualify from 8 separate national competitions.

Association	Qualified teams	Provinces
Tafea Football Association	2 teams	Tafea Province
Shefa Football Association	2 teams	Shefa Province
Luganville Football Association	2 teams	Luganville
Torba Football Association	2 teams	Torba Province
Penama Football Association	2 teams	Penama Province
Sanma Football Association	2 teams	Sanma Province
Malampa Football Association	2 teams	Malampa Province

== Group stage ==
=== Group A ===
Pos	Team	Pld	W	D	L	GF	GA	GD	Pts	Qualification
1	Nalkutan	4	3	1	0	13	4	+9	10	Qualification to final round
2	Medics	4	3	1	0	11	4	+7	10	Qualification to final round
3	Akamb	4	2	0	2	11	6	+5	6	
4	Malnaruru	3	0	0	3	4	14	−10	0	
5	Milo	3	0	0	3	4	15	−11	0	

Rules for classification: 1) points; 2) goal difference; 3) number of goals scored.

=== Group B ===
Pos	Team	Pld	W	D	L	GF	GA	GD	Pts	Qualification
1	Malampa Revivors	4	4	0	0	18	4	+14	12	Qualification to final round
2	Rainbow	4	3	0	1	22	12	+10	9	Qualification to final round
3	Eastland	4	2	0	2	12	11	+1	6	
4	Rangers	4	1	0	3	7	26	−19	3	
5	Lenuke	4	0	0	4	6	12	−6	0	

Rules for classification: 1) points; 2) goal difference; 3) number of goals scored.

=== Group C ===
Pos	Team	Pld	W	D	L	GF	GA	GD	Pts	Qualification
1	Vaum United	3	3	0	0	12	0	+12	9	Qualification to final round
2	Spirit 11	3	2	0	1	5	4	+1	6	Qualification to final round
3	Wanmolmol	3	1	0	2	4	11	−7	3	
4	Tanmet	3	0	0	3	2	8	−6	0	

Rules for classification: 1) points; 2) goal difference; 3) number of goals scored.

== Final round ==
Pos	Team	Pld	W	D	L	GF	GA	GD	Pts	Qualification
1	Nalkutan	5	4	0	1	19	10	+9	12	Qualified for the 2018 OFC Champions League and the 2017 VFF National Super League grand final
2	Vaum United	5	3	1	1	21	10	+11	10	
3	Malampa Revivors	5	3	1	1	14	9	+5	10	
4	Medics	5	2	2	1	11	3	+8	8	
5	Spirit 011	5	1	0	4	6	23	−17	3	
6	Rainbow	5	0	0	5	9	24	−15	0	

Updated to match(es) played on 8 November 2016. Source:
Rules for classification: 1) points; 2) goal difference; 3) number of goals scored.

== Grand final ==
The 2017 VFF National Super League Grand Final was played between two teams:

- Nalkutan, the 2016 VFF National Super League champions
- Erakor Golden Star, the 2017 Port Vila Top Four Super League winners.

Both teams had already qualified for the 2018 OFC Champions League by winning their respective competitions. The Grand Final decided the seeding of the two teams in the 2018 OFC Champions League, with the winner seeded as Vanuatu 1 and the runner-up seeded as Vanuatu 2.

26 August 2017

Nalkutan	1–0	Erakor Golden Star
