= 2012–13 Port Vila Premier League =

2012–13 TVL Premier League
- Season: 2012–13
- Champions: Amicale FC
- Relegated: Seveners United
- Matches: 56
- Goals: 158 (2.82 per match)
- Highest scoring: Ifira Black Bird 3–7; Shepherds United

The 2012–13 TVL Premier League or 2012–13 Port Vila Premier League is the 19th season of the Port Vila Premier League top division.

The top three of the league qualify for the 2013 VFF National Super League.

The season lasted from September 13 to December 12, 2025.

Amicale FC were the champions and Seveners United relegated to the 2013–14 TVL First Division.

== Teams ==
- Amicale FC
- Erakor Golden Star
- Ifira Black Bird
- Seveners United
- Shepherds United
- Spirit 08
- Tafea FC
- Tupuji Imere

== Standings ==
Pos	Team	Pld	W	D	L	GF	GA	GD	Pts	Qualification or relegation
1	Amicale FC (C)	14	11	1	2	30	7	+23	34	Advance to the 2013 Vanuatu National Super League
2	Erakor Golden Star (Q)	14	10	2	2	23	12	+11	32	Advance to the 2013 Vanuatu National Super League
3	Tafea FC (Q)	14	6	4	4	15	11	+4	22	Advance to the 2013 Vanuatu National Super League
4	Spirit 08	14	6	1	7	20	17	+3	19	
5	Shepherds United	14	5	4	5	24	24	0	19	
6	Tupuji Imere	14	5	1	8	17	21	−4	16	
7	Seveners United	14	3	2	9	14	32	−18	11	Relegated to the 2013–14 TVL First Division
8	Ifira Black Bird	14	1	3	10	15	34	−19	6	

Updated to match(es) played on 14 October 2015. Source:
Rules for classification: 1) points; 2) goal difference; 3) number of goals scored.
(C) Champions
