= Stuart Kelly (footballer) =

Scottish footballer

Personal information
- Date of birth: 1 August 1981 (age 45)
- Place of birth: Glasgow, Scotland
- Position: Central midfielder

Youth career
- 1995–1998: Rangers

Senior career*
Years	Team	Apps	(Gls)
1998–2001	Rangers	0	(0)
2001–2002	Shettleston	34	(23)
2002–2004	East Stirlingshire	47	(21)
2004–2007	Canterbury United	46	(25)
2004-2007	Cashmere Technical FC	82	(56)
2008	Oakleigh Cannons FC	15	(3)
2008–2009	South Melbourne FC	10	(2)
2009–2010	Otago United	23	(9)
2010–2011	Auckland City FC	21	(7)
2011–2013	Khonkaen	33	(7)
2012	OPS	3	(0)
2012	PK-37	8	(0)
2013-2017	Christchurch Technical FC	106	(42)
2013	Canterbury United	14	(0)
2014	Puaikura FC	0	(0)
2014-2016	Canterbury United	14	(0)
2016-2017	Southern United	13	(0)
2017-2018	Christhchurch United FC	23	(8)
2019-2020	Halswell United FC	36	(14)

Managerial career
- 1999-2000: Glasgow Rangers FC Youth
- 2001-2004: Scotiish FA (consultant coach)
- 2007-2008: Cashmere Technical FC
- 2009-2010: Otago United FC (assistant)
- 2018-2022: Halswell United (director of football)
- 2019-2021: Halswell United
- 2022-: Eastern Suburbs FC (technical director)
- * Club domestic league appearances and goals

Stuart Kelly (born 1 August 1981) is a Scottish former footballer. He started his professional career at Rangers in 1998. A central midfielder and striker, Kelly has played for top division clubs in New Zealand, Australia and Thailand.

During his career at Auckland City FC they won the Oceania Champions League 2010/11, qualifying for the FIFA World Club Cup in Japan 2011.

== Football career ==
=== Glasgow Rangers ===
Kelly started his career with Rangers Youth. During his early career he was also a youth player with Heart of Midlothian, Blackburn Rovers and Manchester United.

At 14 he made his debut for the Rangers youth team and made his reserve team debut aged 16. In 1996, aged 15 he rejected to sign for Heart of Midlothian, Blackburn Rovers, Manchester United, French club RC Strasbourg and signed with Rangers.

=== Shettleston FC ===
In August 2001 Kelly's contract was not renewed at Rangers. Contracts at Hibernian, St Mirren and Los Angeles Galaxy (work permit), were not successful and eventually signed a one-year contract to play non-league football at Shettleston before the summer transfer window closed in August 2001, where he played alongside former Celtic and Republic of Ireland international Tommy Coyne. Kellys goals helped Shettleston win the league and cup double.

=== East Stirlingshire FC ===
Kelly joined East Stirlingshire after 1 year at Shettleston on a free transfer, as agreed in his contract. Despite East Stirlingshire's poor performances, Kelly scored goals consistently in what was the clubs poorest run of form in their club history. At the end of the 2004 season Kelly had interest from several clubs but signed for 2 years with Canterbury United in New Zealand.

=== Canterbury United ===
Kelly played from 2004 to 2007 for Canterbury United. The New Zealand Knights in 2004 asked Kelly to test and despite an impressive showing he was injured for 4 months and was not offered a contract. In the 2005/06 season Canterbury reached the New Zealand Football Championship grand final, with Kelly scoring two goals in the 90 minutes against Auckland City FC. The game finished 3–3 after extra time and, despite Kelly scoring a penalty, Canterbury were defeated in a sudden death shoot out.

The game was broadcast on Sky Sports in Australia and brought interest from A-League club Newcastle Jets and Oakleigh Cannons.

Kelly was also Canterbury United captain for the 2007/08 season before departing for Australia.

=== Oakleigh Cannons and South Melbourne FC ===
In 2008 Kelly signed for Australian Club Oakleigh Cannons, playing under former Glasgow Rangers and Scotland player Stuart Munro. Inside conflict at the club led to Kelly's departure and he signed with South Melbourne FC as a defensive midfielder. His time at South Melbourne FC was cut short when he suffered a broken leg during a freak training ground collision.

Australian A-League clubs were monitoring his good performances but he returned to New Zealand for rehabilitation.

=== Otago United ===
In September 2008 Kelly returned to the New Zealand Football Championship signing 1-year with Otago United with former international Terry Phelan as his coach. Otago United narrowly missed out on the play-offs in season 2009/10.

During season 2010 Kelly saw a move to the Israeli Premier League with Maccabi Ahi Nazareth F.C., collapse with him then rejecting terms with Israeli First Division club Hapoel Marmorek F.C.

=== Auckland City FC ===
Kelly returned to New Zealand, signing for 1 season with Auckland City FC in September 2010. Auckland City FC won the Oceania Champions League 2011 and were closely beaten in the 2010/11 New Zealand Football Championship grand final going down 3–2 to Waitakere United to an injury time winning goal.

Kelly was a main stay in the Auckland City FC starting eleven but was unable to be part of Auckland City FC's FIFA World Club Cup appearance in December 2011 with the Thailand Premier League season being extended to February 2012.

=== Khonkaen FC ===
In January 2011 Kelly signed a pre contract agreement with Thai Premier League club Khonkaen F.C., on a 2-year contract running from April 2011 and ending April 2013. Former England assistant coach John Gorman and his son Nick assisted the move. Kelly made his début against BEC Tero just five days after winning the 2010–11 OFC Champions League with Auckland City FC.

Ayeyawady United F.C. of the Myanmar Premier League and playing AFC Cup 2012 spoke to Kelly in March 2012 to sign him for only the AFC Cup, but thought he was an Asian visa player.

=== OPS and PK-37 ===
Kelly played three league games on trial with Oulun Palloseura in Finland, before signing for PK-37 one division below until the end of August. Kelly's contract was extended to the end of the season, but he did not re-sign for the 2013 season.

In January 2013, Kelly signed for Nakhon Pathom United but left when the head coach was sacked prior to the start of the season. A brief trial with Thai Premier League club Army United ended with the club needing an Asian visa player instead. Kelly did not sign for another club after the passing of both parents in March. Having missed the transfer windows in Asia, he returned to New Zealand.

=== New Zealand ===
Kelly returned to Cashmere Technical for the New Zealand 2013 winter season, playing his part in the club winning the Mainland Premier League in 2013, 2014, 2015 and 2016, the English Cup in 2013, 2014, 2015 and 2016, the South Island Championship in 2013, 2014 and 2015 and the New Zealand FA Chatham Cup 2013, scoring in the final and repeating winning the Chatham Cup in 2014 with Cashmere Technical, with Kelly awarded the Jack Batty memorial trophy for the games most valuable player. Kelly had spent 2004-2007 at Woolston Technical (Cashmere Technical) and then from 2013 to 2017, having been club captain and head coach while achieving multiple individual awards for Players Player of the Year, Top Goal Scorer and Player of the Year in over 250 appearances.

In October 2013, Kelly returned to Canterbury United for the 2013/14 New Zealand ASB Premiership

Kelly represented Puaikura FC of the Cook Islands in the Oceania Champions League 2014/15 preliminary tournament, scoring 2 goals before returning to Canterbury United for 2014/15 ASB Premiership. Kelly signed with Southern United for the 2015/2016 ASB Premiership

=== Coaching career ===
Kelly began his coaching career with the Glasgow Rangers Youth teams while still a player at the club before becoming a consultant coach for the Scottish FA in 2001 until 2004.

In 2007, Kelly was named Woolston Technicals (Cashmere Technical FC) head coach, finishing third in the Mainland Premier League, winning the English Cup and the New Zealand u19 National Tournament before returning briefly as head coach in the 2008 season.

Kelly was named assistant player-coach of New Zealand National League team Otago United FC (Southern United FC) for the 2009-2010 season and returned to coaching in 2019 as Halswell United's head coach and winning the Canterbury League Championship in 2020 in an undefeated season and gaining promotion to the newly formed New Zealand Football National League for 2021 (Southern Zone).

In 2022 Kelly accepted the role as technical director of Australian National Premier League club Eastern Suburbs FC based in Brisbane.

== International career ==
Kelly represented Scotland at U16–U20 level, making his debut against Northern Ireland in Belfast in 1996.

He was part of the Scotland squad for the 1998 UEFA European Under-16 Football Championship held in Scotland in 1998.

Following a 1–1 draw with holders Spain, 0–0 against the eventual winners the Republic of Ireland and a 2–0 defeat to Finland, Scotland were eliminated from the tournament.

Kelly also played in qualifying rounds for the 2000 World Cup and friendly games.
