= 2015 Port Vila Shield =

- Season: 2015
- Champions: Amicale F.C.
- Matches played: 15
- Goals scored: 48 (3.2 per match)

The 2015 Port Vila Shield was the 3rd edition of the Port Vila Shield, which placed the teams from the 2014–15 TVL Premier League against each other in a cup format. This cup acts a sort of warm-up for the second part of the league in the following months. The competition was held at the Port Vila Municipal Stadium.

== Teams ==
- Amicale FC
- Erakor Golden Star
- Ifira Black Bird
- Narak Tegapu
- Shepherds United
- Spirit 08
- Tafea
- Tupuji Imere

== Group stage ==
=== Group A ===
Pos	Team	Pld	W	D	L	GF	GA	GD	Pts
1	Amicale FC	3	3	0	0	7	1	+6	9
2	Ifira Black Bird	3	1	1	1	2	3	−1	4
3	Spirit 08	3	1	0	2	5	6	−1	3
4	Tupuji Imere	3	0	1	2	2	5	−3	1

23 January 2015
15:00

Tupuji Imere	0–0	Ifira Black Bird
	Report

Port Vila Municipal Stadium, Port Vila
24 January 2015
13:30

Amicale FC	2–1	Spirit 08
Dalong Damilip 39'; Fenedy Masauvakalo 85'	Report	Rodrick Naut 45'

Port Vila Municipal Stadium, Port Vila

31 January 20115
11:00 AM

Ifira Black Bird	2–1	Spirit 08
Andrew Chichirua 31', 70' (pen.)	Report	Alex Saniel 19'

Port Vila Municipal Stadium, Port Vila
31 January 2015
3:00 PM

Amicale FC	3–0	Tupuji Imere
Ilatia Tuilau 18'; Angel Magnoni 65', 89'	Report

Port Vila Municipal Stadium, Port Vila

6 February 2015
3:00 PM

Tupuji Imere	2–3	Spirit

Port Vila Municipal Stadium, Port Vila
7 February 2015
4:00 PM

Amicale FC	2–0	Ifira Black Bird
Octave Meltecoin 1'; Dalong Damalip 65', 89'	Report

Port Vila Municipal Stadium, Port Vila

=== Group B ===
Pos	Team	Pld	W	D	L	GF	GA	GD	Pts
1	Erakor Golden Star	3	3	0	0	14	3	+11	9
2	Tafea	3	2	0	1	10	3	+7	6
3	Shepherds United	3	1	0	2	4	10	−6	3
4	Narak Tegapu	3	0	0	3	0	12	−12	0

24 January 2015
11:00

Tafea	2–3	Erakor Golden Star
Robert Tasso 1'; Bong Kalo 90' (pen.)	Report	Tony Kaltak 1'; Jean Kaltak 1', 2'

Port Vila Municipal Stadium, Port Vila
24 January 2015
15:00

Shepherds United	3–0	Narak Tegapu
Mark Philip 26'; Santino Mermer 40'; John Mark (red card); Yvong August 63'	Report

Port Vila Municipal Stadium, Port Vila

30 January 2015
3:00 PM

Erakor Golden Star	5–0	Narak Tegapu
	Report

Port Vila Municipal Stadium, Port Vila
31 January 2015
1:00 PM

Tafea	4–0	Shepherds United
Robert Tasso 44', 76'; Zika Manuhi 75'; Alista Kalip 78'	Report

Port Vila Municipal Stadium, Port Vila

7 February 2015
12:00 AM

Shepherds United	1–6	Erakor Golden Star
Sike Malas (o.g.)	Report	Jean Kaltak 18', 28', 75', 83'; Nemani Rogara 30'; Michel Kaltack 88'

Port Vila Municipal Stadium, Port Vila
7 February 2015
2:00 PM

Narak Tegapu	0–4	Tafea
	Report	Alista Kalip 30', 84'; Robert Tasso 69'; Moses Kalotang 76'

Port Vila Municipal Stadium, Port Vila

== Playoffs ==
=== Semi-finals ===
February 14, 2015	Amicale F.C.	2–0	Tafea F.C.	Port Vila Municipal Stadium

February 14, 2015	Erakor Golden Star	1–0	Ifira Black Bird F.C.	Port Vila Municipal Stadium

=== Final ===
February 21, 2015	Amicale F.C.	1–0	Erakor Golden Star	Port Vila Municipal Stadium
	Marcomatia Nasali 84'
