= Bernard Daniel =

Vanuatuan footballer (born 1992)

Personal information
- Full name: Bernard Daniel
- Date of birth: 11 August 1992 (age 34)
- Place of birth: Vanuatu
- Position: Forward

Team information
- Current team: Erakor Golden Star

Senior career*
Years	Team	Apps	(Gls)
2008–2016	Spirit 08		(7)
2016	Erakor Golden Star		

International career^{‡}
2012	Vanuatu U23	5	(0)
2015–	Vanuatu	2	(0)
Medal record
Men's football
Representing Vanuatu
Pacific Mini Games
Gold medal – first place	2017 Vanuatu
- * Club domestic league appearances and goals as of 26 November 2016 ‡ National team caps and goals as of 26 November 2016

Bernard Daniel (born 11 August 1992) is a Vanuatuan footballer who plays as a forward for Erakor Golden Star in the Port Vila Premier League. He made his debut for the national team on 7 November 2015, in their 1–1 draw with Fiji.

== Honours ==
Vanuatu

- Pacific Mini Games: Gold Medalist, 2017
