= 2008 VFF Bred Cup =

- Champions: Port Vila Sharks
- Matches played: 19

The 2008 VFF Bred Cup was the qualifying competition for the 2008–09 OFC Champions League. The club who advanced to this tournament was Port Vila Sharks, Vanuatu's sole representative at the competition. The competition was played in two separate championships, north and south, with each winner and runners-up facing off in the overall finals.

== Northern championship ==
=== Teams ===
- AS Concorde
- Penama United
- Rainbow F.C. (winners)*
- Supa Maka (runners-up)*
- Torba United

* Qualified for the overall finals

== Southern championship ==
=== Teams ===
- Port Vila Mauriki
- Port Vila Sharks (winners)
- Shefa Kings United
- Tafea Hornets (runners-up)

=== Standings ===
Pos	Team	Pld	W	D	L	GF	GA	GD	Pts	Qualification
1	Port Vila Sharks	2	2	0	0	5	0	+5	6	Advance to the overall finals.
2	Tafea Hornets	3	2	0	1	5	1	+4	6	Advance to the overall finals.
3	Port Vila Mauriki	2	1	0	1	3	2	+1	3	
4	Shefa Kings United	3	0	0	3	0	8	−8	0	

Updated to match(es) played on October 17, 2015. Source:
Rules for classification: 1) points; 2) goal difference; 3) number of goals scored.

== Overall finals ==
=== Semi-finals ===
May 21, 2008

Rainbows F.C.	–	Tafea Hornets

Tafea Hornets advanced to the overall final.

May 21, 2008

Port Vila Sharks	–	Supa Maka

Port Vila Sharks advanced to the overall final.

=== Final ===
May 24, 2008

Port Vila Sharks	4–0	Tafea Hornets

Port Vila Sharks advance to the 2008–09 OFC Champions League.
