= Loic Wakanumuné =

New Caledonian footballer (born 1985)

Personal information
- Full name: Loic Yeiwene Wakanumune
- Date of birth: 27 March 1985 (age 41)
- Place of birth: New Caledonia
- Position: Defender

Senior career*
Years	Team	Apps	(Gls)
2009–2011	AS Mont-Dore		
2012–2013	AS Magenta		
2014	Gaïtcha FCN		
2015–2016	AS Magenta		

International career^{‡}
2010–2016	New Caledonia	10	(0)
- * Club domestic league appearances and goals as of 25 June 2016 ‡ National team caps and goals as of 25 June 2016

Loic Wakanumuné (born 27 March 1985) is a New Caledonian footballer who plays as a defender for AS Magenta in the New Caledonia Super Ligue.
