= Percy Avock =

Vanuatuan footballer and manager

Personal information
- Full name: Percy Avock
- Date of birth: 10 June 1968 (age 58)
- Place of birth: Port Vila, Vanuatu

Managerial career
- Years: Team
- 2011: Yatel
- 2011–2012: AS Mont-Dore
- 2012-2015: Vanuatu
- 2012–2016: AS Mont-Dore
- 2016–2017: Malampa Revivors

Percy Avock (born 10 June 1968) is a former Vanuatuan footballer and the current manager of Vanuatuan club Malampa Revivors. Avock was the coach of the Vanuatu national football team for the 2012 OFC Nations Cup. He is one of Vanuatu coaches which has had a sports education in France

== Career ==
Avock started his coaching career with Yatel and he stayed with the club until 2011. From December 2011 until April 2012 he was a coach of the AS Mont-Dore. From May 2012 he coached the Vanuatu national football team for the 2012 OFC Nations Cup. This tournament ended as a disappointment for Vanuatu and Avock was fired. After this he went back to New Caledonia to train AS Mont-Dore. In December 2016 it was announced that Avock became the coach of Malampa Revivors to help them for the 2017 OFC Champions League

== Private life ==
Avock lives in Nouméa where he runs a small electrical company.
