= 2014–15 OFC Champions League =

2015 Fiji Airways OFC Champions League

Tournament details
- Host countries: Preliminary stage: American Samoa; Final stage: Fiji
- Dates: Preliminary stage: 7–11 October 2014; Final stage: 11–26 April 2015
- Teams: Final stage: 12; Total: 15 (from 11 associations)

Final positions
- Champions: (New Zealand) Auckland City (7th title)
- Runners-up: (New Zealand) Team Wellington

Tournament statistics
- Matches played: 27
- Goals scored: 97 (3.59 per match)
- Top scorer(s): Preliminary stage: (Samoa) Silao Malo; Final stage: (Fiji) Saula Waqa (5 goals each)
- Best player: (New Zealand) Ivan Vicelich
- Best goalkeeper: (New Zealand) Tamati Williams
- Fair play award: (Fiji) Suva

The 2014–15 OFC Champions League (officially the 2015 Fiji Airways OFC Champions League for sponsorship reasons) was the 14th edition of the Oceanian Club Championship, Oceania's premier club football tournament organized by the Oceania Football Confederation (OFC), and the 9th season under the current OFC Champions League name.

In an all-New Zealand final, four-time defending champions Auckland City defeated Team Wellington 4–3 on penalties (1–1 after extra time) to win their fifth consecutive and seventh overall title. As the winner of the 2014–15 OFC Champions League, Auckland City earned the right to represent the OFC at the 2015 FIFA Club World Cup.

== Teams ==
Location of teams of the 2014–15 OFC Champions League.
Teams entering the group stage
Teams entering the preliminary stage

A total of 15 teams from all 11 OFC associations entered the competition. The four associations with the best results in the 2013–14 OFC Champions League (Fiji, New Zealand, Tahiti, Vanuatu) were awarded two berths each, and three other associations (New Caledonia, Papua New Guinea, Solomon Islands) were awarded one berth each. Those teams directly entered the group stage, to be joined by the winner of the preliminary stage, which was contested by teams from the four developing associations (American Samoa, Cook Islands, Samoa, Tonga).

Association	Team	Qualifying method
Teams entering the group stage
Fiji	Suva	2014 Fiji National Football League champion
Fiji	Ba	2014 Fiji National Football League runner-up
(New Caledonia) New Caledonia	Gaïtcha	2013 New Caledonia Super Ligue champion
(New Zealand) New Zealand	Auckland City	2013–14 New Zealand Football Championship grand final champion 2013–14 New Zealand Football Championship regular season premier
(New Zealand) New Zealand	Team Wellington	2013–14 New Zealand Football Championship regular season runner-up
(Papua New Guinea) Papua New Guinea	Hekari United	2014 Papua New Guinea National Soccer League champion
(Solomon Islands) Solomon Islands	Western United	2014–15 Solomon Islands S-League champion
(French Polynesia) Tahiti	Pirae	2013–14 Tahiti Ligue 1 champion
(French Polynesia) Tahiti	Tefana	2014–15 Tahiti Ligue 1 regular phase winner
Vanuatu	Tafea	2014 VFF National Super League champion
Vanuatu	Amicale	2014 VFF National Super League runner-up
Teams entering the preliminary stage
(American Samoa) American Samoa	SKBC	2013 FFAS Senior League champion
(Cook Islands) Cook Islands	Puaikura	2013 Cook Islands Round Cup champion
Samoa	Lupe ole Soaga	2012–13 Samoa National League champion
Tonga	Lotoha'apai United	2013 Tonga Major League champion

== Schedule ==
The schedule of the competition was as follows. For this edition, the semi-finals and final were played as single matches (instead of over two legs on a home-and-away format as in the previous edition).

Stage		Date
Preliminary stage (Host: Samoa)	Matchday 1	7 October 2014
Preliminary stage (Host: Samoa)	Matchday 2	9 October 2014
Preliminary stage (Host: Samoa)	Matchday 3	11 October 2014
Group stage (Host: Fiji)	Matchday 1	11–12 April 2015
Group stage (Host: Fiji)	Matchday 2	14–15 April 2015
Group stage (Host: Fiji)	Matchday 3	17–18 April 2015
Knockout stage (Host: Fiji)	Semi-finals	21 April 2015
Knockout stage (Host: Fiji)	Final	26 April 2015

== Preliminary stage ==
The preliminary stage was played in Apia, Samoa from 7 to 11 October 2014. The draw to determine the fixtures was held on 22 September 2014 at the OFC headquarters in Auckland, New Zealand. The four teams played each other on a round-robin basis. The group winner advanced to the group stage to join the 11 automatic qualifiers.

Pos	Team	Pld	W	D	L	GF	GA	GD	Pts	Qualification
1	(Samoa) Lupe ole Soaga (H)	3	3	0	0	10	2	+8	9	Advance to group stage
2	(Cook Islands) Puaikura	3	1	1	1	4	4	0	4	
3	(Tonga) Lotoha'apai United	3	1	0	2	4	3	+1	3	
4	(American Samoa) SKBC	3	0	1	2	2	11	−9	1	

Source: OFC
(H) Hosts

All times UTC+14.

7 October 2014
16:30

SKBC (American Samoa)	1–1	(Cook Islands) Puaikura
Kang 90'	Report	Pennycook 45+1'

Joseph S. Blatter Football Complex, Apia
Referee: Ravitesh Behari (Fiji)
7 October 2014
19:00

Lotoha'apai United (Tonga)	0–1	(Samoa) Lupe ole Soaga
	Report	L. Gosche 83'

Joseph S. Blatter Football Complex, Apia
Referee: Robinson Banga (Vanuatu)

9 October 2014
16:30

SKBC (American Samoa)	1–4	(Tonga) Lotoha'apai United
Kang 81'	Report	Ma. Uhatahi 4' (pen.), 79' (pen.); Mafi 32'; Maamaaloa 56'

Joseph S. Blatter Football Complex, Apia
Referee: Amos Anio (Papua New Guinea)
9 October 2014
19:00

Lupe ole Soaga (Samoa)	3–2	(Cook Islands) Puaikura
Malo 8', 45+4'; Setefano 75'	Report	Kelly 9'; Tiputoa 10'

Joseph S. Blatter Football Complex, Apia
Referee: Gerald Oiaka (Solomon Islands)

11 October 2014
15:00

Puaikura (Cook Islands)	1–0	(Tonga) Lotoha'apai United
Kelly 83'	Report

Joseph S. Blatter Football Complex, Apia
Referee: Gerald Oiaka (Solomon Islands)
11 October 2014
17:30

Lupe ole Soaga (Samoa)	6–0	(American Samoa) SKBC
Malo 21', 48', 53'; Toni 77'; L. Gosche 81'; Setefano 90+4'	Report

Joseph S. Blatter Football Complex, Apia
Referee: Robinson Banga (Vanuatu)

== Group stage ==
The group stage was played in Ba and Suva, Fiji from 11 to 18 April 2015. The draw for the group stage was held on 5 December 2014 at the OFC headquarters in Auckland, New Zealand. The 12 teams were drawn into three groups of four, with each group containing one team from each of the four pots. The allocation of teams into pots was based on the results of their associations in the previous edition of the OFC Champions League. Teams from the same association could not be drawn into the same group.

Pot 1	Pot 2	Pot 3	Pot 4
(New Zealand) Auckland City; (French Polynesia) Pirae; (Vanuatu) Tafea	(Fiji) Ba; (New Zealand) Team Wellington; (Solomon Islands) Western United	(New Caledonia) Gaïtcha; (French Polynesia) Tefana; (Vanuatu) Amicale	(Fiji) Suva; (Papua New Guinea) Hekari United; (Samoa) Lupe ole Soaga (preliminary winner)

The schedule was confirmed on 4 February 2015. In each group, the four teams played each other on a round-robin basis. The group winners and the best runner-up advanced to the semi-finals.

All times UTC+12.

=== Group A ===
Pos	Team	Pld	W	D	L	GF	GA	GD	Pts	Qualification
1	(Fiji) Ba (H)	3	3	0	0	8	1	+7	9	Advance to knockout stage
2	(New Caledonia) Gaïtcha	3	2	0	1	13	6	+7	6	Advance to knockout stage
3	(French Polynesia) Pirae	3	0	1	2	5	10	−5	1	
4	(Samoa) Lupe ole Soaga	3	0	1	2	5	14	−9	1	

Source: OFC
(H) Hosts
11 April 2015
16:30

Pirae (French Polynesia)	3–3	(Samoa) Lupe ole Soaga
Warren 2'; Tavanae 16'; Tehau 23'	Report	Gannon 8'; Ataga 58'; L. Gosche 69'

Govind Park, Ba
Attendance: 2,500
Referee: Robinson Banga (Vanuatu)
11 April 2015
19:00

Ba (Fiji)	3–0	(New Caledonia) Gaïtcha
Shaheed 21'; Tiwa 33'; Suwamy 88'	Report

Govind Park, Ba
Attendance: 2,500
Referee: Nick Waldron (New Zealand)

The kick-off of Group A matches on matchday 2 were delayed by 30 minutes due to heavy rain.

14 April 2015
17:00

Lupe ole Soaga (Samoa)	1–3	(Fiji) Ba
Malo 37'	Report	Waqa 32', 46', 53'

Govind Park, Ba
Attendance: 1,600
Referee: Albert Maru (Papua New Guinea)
14 April 2015
19:30

Gaïtcha (New Caledonia)	5–2	(French Polynesia) Pirae
Wakanumune 24'; Wajoka 37', 66'; Drawilo 43'; Kaï 85'	Report	Vaki 49'; Tinirauarii 88'

Govind Park, Ba
Attendance: 1,600
Referee: Robinson Banga (Vanuatu)

18 April 2015
16:30

Gaïtcha (New Caledonia)	8–1	(Samoa) Lupe ole Soaga
Pawawi 8'; Wajoka 9'; Kaï 45+2' (pen.), 79' (pen.); Toto 49'; Sansot 51'; Ouka 52'; Kaqea 88'	Report	Toni 5'

Govind Park, Ba
Attendance: 2,500
Referee: Nick Waldron (New Zealand)
18 April 2015
19:00

Pirae (French Polynesia)	0–2	(Fiji) Ba
	Report	Waqa 15', 55'

Govind Park, Ba
Attendance: 2,600
Referee: Robinson Banga (Vanuatu)

=== Group B ===
Pos	Team	Pld	W	D	L	GF	GA	GD	Pts	Qualification
1	(New Zealand) Auckland City	3	3	0	0	9	0	+9	9	Advance to knockout stage
2	(Vanuatu) Amicale	3	2	0	1	4	5	−1	6	
3	(Fiji) Suva (H)	3	1	0	2	5	7	−2	3	
4	(Solomon Islands) Western United	3	0	0	3	1	7	−6	0	

Source: OFC
(H) Hosts
11 April 2015
16:30

Auckland City (New Zealand)	3–0	(Fiji) Suva
Browne 12' (pen.); Burfoot 64'; McGeorge 86'	Report

National Stadium, Suva
Attendance: 5,000
Referee: Norbert Hauata (Tahiti)
11 April 2015
19:00

Western United (Solomon Islands)	0–1	(Vanuatu) Amicale
	Report	Magnoni 49'

National Stadium, Suva
Attendance: 7,000
Referee: Salesh Chand (Fiji)

14 April 2015
16:30

Auckland City (New Zealand)	3–0	(Solomon Islands) Western United
White 68', 87'; Souto 73'	Report

National Stadium, Suva
Attendance: 3,000
Referee: Ravitesh Behari (Fiji)
14 April 2015
19:00

Amicale (Vanuatu)	3–2	(Fiji) Suva
Vakatalesau 16', 47'; Masauvakalo 90+1'	Report	Chand 36'; Navunigasau 69'

National Stadium, Suva
Attendance: 3,000
Referee: George Time (Solomon Islands)

18 April 2015
16:30

Suva (Fiji)	3–1	(Solomon Islands) Western United
Medina 36' (pen.); Aman 42'; Rabo 84'	Report	Nawo 54'

National Stadium, Suva
Attendance: 2,000
Referee: Ichikawa Polovili (Tonga)
18 April 2015
19:00

Amicale (Vanuatu)	0–3	(New Zealand) Auckland City
	Report	Moreira 3', 56', 64'

National Stadium, Suva
Attendance: 2,000
Referee: Norbert Hauata (Tahiti)

=== Group C ===
Pos	Team	Pld	W	D	L	GF	GA	GD	Pts	Qualification
1	(New Zealand) Team Wellington	3	3	0	0	7	3	+4	9	Advance to knockout stage
2	(Papua New Guinea) Hekari United	3	2	0	1	6	6	0	6	
3	(Vanuatu) Tafea	3	0	1	2	5	7	−2	1	
4	(French Polynesia) Tefana	3	0	1	2	4	6	−2	1	

Source: OFC
12 April 2015
16:30

Tafea (Vanuatu)	2–3	(Papua New Guinea) Hekari United
J. Kaltack 61', 90'	Report	Ifunaoa 1'; Semmy 11'; Maemae 54'

National Stadium, Suva
Attendance: 2,000
Referee: George Time (Solomon Islands)
12 April 2015
19:00

Team Wellington (New Zealand)	2–1	(French Polynesia) Tefana
Corrales 36'; Smith 67'	Report	O'Keeffe 44' (o.g.)

National Stadium, Suva
Attendance: 2,000
Referee: Nelson Sogo (Solomon Islands)

15 April 2015
16:30

Hekari United (Papua New Guinea)	0–2	(New Zealand) Team Wellington
	Report	Aengari 22' (o.g.); Smith 45+1'

National Stadium, Suva
Attendance: 700
Referee: Norbert Hauata (Tahiti)
15 April 2015
19:00

Tefana (French Polynesia)	1–1	(Vanuatu) Tafea
Tchen 85' (pen.)	Report	J. Kaltack 36'

National Stadium, Suva
Attendance: 900
Referee: Salesh Chand (Fiji)

17 April 2015
16:30

Tefana (French Polynesia)	2–3	(Papua New Guinea) Hekari United
Tchen 35' (pen.); Tinorua 49'	Report	Ifunaoa 13'; Aengari 45+3'; Semmy 58'

National Stadium, Suva
Attendance: 500
Referee: Ravitesh Behari (Fiji)
17 April 2015
19:00

Tafea (Vanuatu)	2–3	(New Zealand) Team Wellington
J. Kaltack 28'; Nicholls 56'	Report	Robertson 19'; Smith 53'; Gwyther 82'

National Stadium, Suva
Attendance: 500
Referee: Norbert Hauata (Tahiti)

=== Ranking of second-placed teams ===
Pos	Grp	Team	Pld	W	D	L	GF	GA	GD	Pts	Qualification
1	A	(New Caledonia) Gaïtcha	3	2	0	1	13	6	+7	6	Advance to knockout stage
2	C	(Papua New Guinea) Hekari United	3	2	0	1	6	6	0	6	
3	B	(Vanuatu) Amicale	3	2	0	1	4	5	−1	6	

Source: OFC

== Knockout stage ==
The knockout stage was played in Suva, Fiji from 21 to 26 April 2015. The four teams played on a single-elimination basis.

=== Bracket ===
Semi-finals
(New Caledonia) Gaïtcha	0
(New Zealand) Auckland City	1
(Fiji) Ba	0
(New Zealand) Team Wellington	2

Final
(New Zealand) Auckland City (p)	1 (4)
(New Zealand) Team Wellington	1 (3)

All times UTC+12.

=== Semi-finals ===
21 April 2015
15:30

Gaïtcha (New Caledonia)	0–1	(New Zealand) Auckland City
	Report	Đorđević 72'

National Stadium, Suva
Attendance: 4,500
Referee: Ravitesh Behari (Fiji)

21 April 2015
19:00

Ba (Fiji)	0–2	(New Zealand) Team Wellington
	Report	Gwyther 11', 16'

National Stadium, Suva
Attendance: 7,200
Referee: Norbert Hauata (Tahiti)

=== Final ===
26 April 2015
19:00

Auckland City (New Zealand)	1–1 (a.e.t.)	(New Zealand) Team Wellington
Moreira 14' (pen.)	Report	Hogg 79'
Penalties
Đorđević (penalty scored); Berlanga (penalty missed); McGeorge (penalty scored); Browne (penalty scored); Kim (penalty scored)	4–3	(penalty scored) Feneridis; (penalty missed) Corrales; (penalty scored) Peverley; (penalty scored) Gulley; (penalty missed) Hogg

National Stadium, Suva
Attendance: 3,000
Referee: Norbert Hauata (Tahiti)

== Awards ==
Preliminary stage
Award	Player	Team
Golden Ball	(Samoa) Silao Malo	(Samoa) Lupe ole Soaga
Golden Boot	(Samoa) Silao Malo	(Samoa) Lupe ole Soaga
Golden Gloves	(Tonga) Sione Faupula	(Tonga) Lotoha'apai United
Fair Play Award	—	(Cook Islands) Puaikura

Final stage (Group stage & Knockout stage)
Award	Player	Team
Golden Ball	(New Zealand) Ivan Vicelich	(New Zealand) Auckland City
Golden Boot	(Fiji) Saula Waqa	(Fiji) Ba
Golden Gloves	(New Zealand) Tamati Williams	(New Zealand) Auckland City
Fair Play Award	—	(Fiji) Suva

== Top goalscorers ==
Preliminary stage
Rank	Player	Team	Goals
1	(Samoa) Silao Malo	(Samoa) Lupe ole Soaga	5
2	(Samoa) Luki Gosche	(Samoa) Lupe ole Soaga	2
2	(South Korea) Kang Gun-chul	(American Samoa) SKBC	2
2	(Scotland) Stuart Kelly	(Cook Islands) Puaikura	2
2	(Samoa) Andrew Setefano	(Samoa) Lupe ole Soaga	2
2	(Tonga) Mark Uhatahi	(Tonga) Lotoha'apai United	2

Final stage (Group stage & Knockout stage)
Rank	Player	Team	Goals
1	(Fiji) Saula Waqa	(Fiji) Ba	5
2	(Vanuatu) Jean Kaltack	(Vanuatu) Tafea	4
2	(Portugal) João Moreira	(New Zealand) Auckland City	4
4	(New Zealand) Michael Gwyther	(New Zealand) Team Wellington	3
4	(New Caledonia) Bertrand Kaï	(New Caledonia) Gaïtcha	3
4	(New Zealand) Jarrod Smith	(New Zealand) Team Wellington	3
4	(New Caledonia) Jean-Christ Wajoka	(New Caledonia) Gaïtcha	3
8	(Solomon Islands) Dennis Ifunaoa	(Papua New Guinea) Hekari United	2
8	(Papua New Guinea) Tommy Semmy	(Papua New Guinea) Hekari United	2
8	(French Polynesia) Angelo Tchen	(French Polynesia) Tefana	2
8	(Fiji) Osea Vakatalesau	(Vanuatu) Amicale	2
8	(England) Darren White	(New Zealand) Auckland City	2

Source: OFC

== See also ==
- 2015 FIFA Club World Cup
