= VFF Champions League =

- Founded: 2005
- Region: Vanuatu
- Number of clubs: 8
- Level on pyramid: 1
- International cup: OFC Champions League
- Current champions: ABM Galaxy (2026)
- Most championships: Amicale; Tafea; ABM Galaxy (4 titles each)
- Website: http://www.vff.vu/
- Current: 2026 VFF Champions League

The VFF Champions League, formerly known as the VFF National Super League and the VFF Bred Cup, is the national league of Vanuatu.

The league is not fully professional.

== Format ==
The top teams from 8 Vanuatu football associations compete in 2 groups and the top two from each advance to the semifinals. The winner of the semis advances to the finals, where the winner qualifies for the OFC Champions League.

The 8 Associations are:

Association	League	Provinces
Tafea Football Association	Tafea Football League	Tafea Province
Port Vila Football Association	Port Vila Football League	Shefa Province
Shefa Football Association	Shefa Football League	Shefa Province
Luganville Football Association	Luganville Football League	Luganville
Torba Football Association	Torba Football League	Torba Province
Penama Football Association	Penama Football League	Penama Province
Sanma Football Association	Sanma Football League	Sanma Province
Malampa Football Association	Malampa Football League	Malampa Province

== List of champions ==
Season	Winner	Result	Runner-up
VFF Bred Cup
2005	Tafea	Draw. Won on penalties.	Vaum United
2006	Unknown		
2007	Unknown		
2008	Port Vila Sharks	4–0	Tafea Hornets
2009	Tafea	4–1	Vaum United
VFF National Super League
2010	Amicale	RR	Tafea
2011	Amicale	RR	Tafea
2012	Amicale	RR	Tafea
2013	Tafea	1–0	Amicale
2014	Tafea	3–1	Amicale
2015	Amicale	3–0	Malampa Revivors
2016	Nalkutan	RR	Vaum United
2017	Not played		
2018	Malampa Revivors	RR	Vaum United
2019	Malampa Revivors	2–1	Fenua Temanu Bakou
2020	Galaxy	5–0	Malampa Revivors
VFF Champions League
2021	Galaxy	3–0	RueRue
2022	Ifira Black Bird	1–0	Sia-Raga
2023	Ifira Black Bird	2–0	Classic
2024	Ifira Black Bird	4–1	Classic Kapalpal
2025	ABM Galaxy	2–1	M3 United FC
2026	ABM Galaxy	4–0	Classic FC

== Performance by club ==
The performance of various clubs is shown in the following table:

Club	Winners	Runners-up	Winning Years
Tafea	4	3	2005, 2009, 2013, 2014
Amicale	4	2	2010, 2011, 2012, 2015
ABM Galaxy	4	–	2020, 2021, 2025, 2026
Ifira Black Bird	3	–	2022, 2023, 2024
Malampa Revivors	2	2	2018, 2019
Nalkutan	1	–	2016
Port Vila Sharks	1	–	2008
Vaum United	–	4	–
Classic	–	2	–
Tafea Hornets	–	1	–
Classic Kapalpal	–	1	–
Fenua Temanu Bakou	–	1	–
RueRue	–	1	–
Sia-Raga	–	1	–
M3 United FC	–	1	–

== Grand final ==
Played between the champions of the VFF Champions League and the Port Vila Top Four Super League.

Season	Winner	Result	Runner-up
2017	Nalkutan	1–0	Erakor Golden Star
2018	Erakor Golden Star	(6–5 pen.)	Malampa Revivors
2019	Malampa Revivors	3–1	Galaxy
2020	Galaxy	3–0	Malampa Revivors

== See also ==
Port Vila Football League
