= Joseph Namariau =

Vanuatuan footballer (born 1988)

Personal information
- Date of birth: 12 January 1988 (age 38)
- Position: Forward

Senior career*
| Years | Team | Apps | (Gls) |
| 2010 | Labasa F.C. | | |
| 2010–2014 | Tafea F.C. | | (4) |

International career
| 2008–2012 | Vanuatu | 4 | (0) |
- * Club domestic league appearances and goals

Joseph Namariau (born 12 January 1988) is a Vanuatuan former footballer who played as a forward. He retired from playing football in 2014.

Namariau was educated at Lenakel Secondary school and the University of the South Pacific.

He played for Suva with Seimata Chilia, then for Labasa F.C. in Fiji, and for Tafea F.C. in the Solomon Islands.
