= Lamenu Stadium =

Stadium located in Tanna Island, Vanuatu

- Interactive map of Lamenu Stadium
- Full name: Lamenu Stadium
- Location: White Sand Road, Lenakel, Tanna, Vanuatu
- Coordinates: 19°32′00″S 169°16′10″E
- Owner: Vanuatu Football Federation
- Capacity: 2,000
- Type: Sport venue
- Surface: Grass

Tenants
- Nalkutan F.C., events

Lamenu Stadium is a multi-purpose stadium located in Tanna Island, Vanuatu. Its foremost use if for football purposes attributable to its grass field.

There is an Under-15 Centre of Excellence football program at Lamenu Stadium headed by Joel Stephen.

A promotional football 'Respect Festival' took place in Vanuatu in February 2016 with Lamenu Stadium hosting the one on Tanna.

The Vanuatu Cricket Outreach Programme launched at this venue in 2012. On top of that, it was the venue for the 2017 TVL Cup final, which marked the culmination of the season.

== Charity ==
UNICEF held a birth certificate awareness event along with football festivities in this venue with the slogan: a birth certificate is a child's passport to protection.
