= 2014 VFF National Super League =

Tournament details
- Host country: Vanuatu
- Dates: June 14 - July 19, 2014
- Teams: 18 (from 8 associations)

Final positions
- Champions: Tafea FC
- Runners-up: Amicale FC

Tournament statistics
- Matches played: 39

The 2014 VFF National Super League was the Vanuatu qualifying competition for the 2014–15 OFC Champions League.

The competition was won by the Port Vila club, Tafea FC.

== Teams ==
18 teams will qualify from 8 separate national competitions.

Association	Qualified Teams	Provinces
Port Vila Football Association	Amicale FC; Tafea FC; Spirit 08; Erakor Golden Star	Port Vila
Tafea Football Association	Mangde FC; Spirit 11 FC	Tafea Province
Shefa Football Association	Malnaruru FC; Elluck FC	Shefa Province
Luganville Football Association	Torba United FC; Malampa Revivors FC	Luganville
Torba Football Association	Hi-Lands FC; Nalkutan FC	Torba Province
Penama Football Association	Arato FC; X United FC	Penama Province
Sanma Football Association	Tutuba FC; Wayalo FC	Sanma Province
Malampa Football Association	Capro FC	Malampa Province

== Matches ==
=== Group stage ===
From Group A, Spirit 11 FC advanced in first place and Torba United FC advanced in second place.

From Group B, Malampa Revivors FC advanced in first place and Tutuba FC advanced in second place.

From Group C, Tafea F.C. advanced in first place and Amicale F.C. advanced in second place.

From Group D, Spirit 08 F.C. advanced in first place and Malnaruru FC advanced in second place.

=== Playoffs ===
==== Quarter-finals ====
July 5, 2014	Spirit 11 FC	0–0 (5–3 p)	Tutuba FC	Luganville Soccer Stadium

July 5, 2014	Malampa Revivors FC	1–1 (4–2 p)	Torba United FC	Luganville Soccer Stadium

July 5, 2014	Tafea F.C.	6–0	Malnaruru FC	Port Vila Municipal Stadium

July 5, 2014	Spirit 08 F.C.	0–3	Amicale F.C.	Port Vila Municipal Stadium

==== Semi-finals ====
July 12, 2014	Spirit 11 FC	0–3	Tafea F.C.	Luganville Soccer Stadium

July 12, 2014	Amicale F.C.	7–0	Malampa Revivors FC	Port Vila Municipal Stadium

==== Grand final ====
July 19, 2014	Tafea F.C.	3–1	Amicale F.C.	Port Vila Municipal Stadium
