= 2015 VFF National Super League =

2015 VFF National Super League

Tournament details
- Host country: Vanuatu
- Dates: 7–26 September 2015
- Teams: 18 (from 8 associations)

Final positions
- Champions: Amicale FC
- Runners-up: Malampa Revivors FC

Tournament statistics
- Matches played: 40
- Goals scored: 84 (2.1 per match)

The 2015 VFF National Super League was the Vanuatu qualifying competition for the 2015–16 OFC Champions League and the 2017 OFC Champions League for clubs outside of Port Vila.

The team who qualified for the 2015–16 OFC Champions League is Amicale FC. The team who qualified for the 2017 OFC Champions League is Malampa Revivors.

== Teams ==
18 teams will qualify from 8 separate national competitions.

Association	Qualified Teams	Provinces
Port Vila Football Association	Amicale FC; Tafea FC; Ifira Black Bird; Erakor Golden Star	Port Vila
Tafea Football Association	LL Echo FC; Piaurupu FC	Tafea Province
Shefa Football Association	Malnaruru FC; Paunagisu FC	Shefa Province
Luganville Football Association	Vaum United FC; Malampa Revivors	Luganville
Torba Football Association	Amicale Sola FC; Mangde FC	Torba Province
Penama Football Association	Bubuky FC; Blue Rovers FC	Penama Province
Sanma Football Association	Big Bay FC; Eastern Star FC	Sanma Province
Malampa Football Association	Atsal FC; Pelala FC	Malampa Province

== Matches ==
=== Group stage ===
From Group A, Big Bay FC advanced in first place and Malampa Revivors advanced in second place.

From Group B, Blue Rovers FC advanced in first place and Vaum United FC advanced in second place.

From Group C, Ifira Black Bird F.C. advanced in first place and Amicale F.C. advanced in second place.

From Group D, Erakor Golden Star advanced in first place and LL Echo advanced in second place.

=== Playoffs ===
==== Quarter-finals ====
September 19, 2015	Blue Rovers FC	–	Malampa Revivors	Luganville Soccer Stadium

September 19, 2015	Big Bay FC	–	Vaum United FC	Luganville Soccer Stadium

September 19, 2015	Ifira Black Bird F.C.	5–2	LL Echo	Port Vila Municipal Stadium

September 19, 2015	Erakor Golden Star	0–4	Amicale F.C.	Port Vila Municipal Stadium

==== Semi-finals ====
September 23, 2015	Malampa Revivors	2–1	Ifira Black Bird F.C.	Luganville Soccer Stadium
	Andre Batick 1'; Wala Jacob 35'		Andrew Chichirua 35(pen.)'

September 23, 2015	Vaum United FC	0–2	Amicale F.C.	Luganville Soccer Stadium
			James Naka 6'; Fenedy Masauvakalo 20'

==== Third-Place Match ====
September 26, 2015	Vaum United FC	2–3	Ifira Black Bird F.C.	Luganville Soccer Stadium

==== Grand Final ====
September 26, 2015	Malampa Revivors	0–3	Amicale F.C.	Luganville Soccer Stadium
			Jackson Tasso 11'; Fenedy Masauvakalo 24'; James Naka 76'
