= Westtan Broncos F.C. =

Association football club in Vanuatu

- Full name: Westtan Broncos Football Club
- Founded: 2002
- Ground: Korman Stadium; Port Vila, Vanuatu
- Capacity: 5,000
- Manager: (Vanuatu) Samson Vurevur
- League: Port Vila Football League
- 2007: 5th
Home colours

Westtan Broncos FC, originally Westtan Verts FC, is a Vanuatuan football team based in Port Vila. They have played in the Vanuatu Premia Divisen or Port Vila Football League, the country's top football competition.
