= 2014–15 Port Vila Premier League =

2014–15 TVL Premier League
- Season: 2014–15
- Champions: Amicale FC
- Relegated: Narak Tegapu
- Matches: 56

The 2014–15 TVL Premier League or 2014–15 Port Vila Premier League is the 21st edition of the Port Vila Premier League top division.

The top four of the league qualify for the 2015 VFF National Super League and the lowest team relegates to the 2015–16 TVL First Division.

Before the season, the 2014 TVL Smile Cup was held as an opening tournament, with Tafea FC taking out the title.

== Teams ==
- Amicale FC
- Erakor Golden Star
- Ifira Black Bird
- Narak Tegapu
- Shepherds United
- Spirit 08
- Tafea FC
- Tupuji Imere

== Standings ==
Pos	Team	Pld	W	D	L	GF	GA	GD	Pts	Qualification or relegation
1	Amicale FC (C, Q)	14	10	3	1	25	7	+18	33	Qualified for the 2015 VFF National Super League
2	Erakor Golden Star (Q)	14	8	2	4	24	17	+7	26	Qualified for the 2015 VFF National Super League
3	Ifira Black Bird (Q)	14	6	6	2	22	14	+8	24	Qualified for the 2015 VFF National Super League
4	Tafea FC (Q)	14	5	6	3	16	12	+4	21	Qualified for the 2015 VFF National Super League
5	Tupuji Imere	14	6	1	7	17	18	−1	19	
6	Spirit 08	14	5	2	7	21	26	−5	17	
7	Shepherds United	14	3	0	11	15	27	−12	9	
8	Narak Tegapu (R)	14	2	2	10	10	29	−19	8	Relegated to the 2015–16 TVL First Division

Updated to match(es) played on 23 September 2015. Source:
Rules for classification: 1) points; 2) goal difference; 3) number of goals scored.
(C) Champions; (Q) Qualified for the phase indicated; (R) Relegated

== TVL Smile Cup ==
Before the 2014–15 TVL Premier League, the TVL Smile Cup was hosted as an opening cup at Port Vila Municipal Stadium. The 2014 TVL Smile Cup was won by Tafea.

=== Teams ===
- Amicale FC
- Erakor Golden Star
- Ifira Black Bird
- Narak Tegapu
- Shepherds United
- Spirit 08
- Tafea
- Tupuji Imere

=== Matches ===
The 8 teams participating were split into 2 groups, with the top 2 from each group advancing to the semi-finals, and the winners of the two semi-finals facing off in the grand final.

=== Group stage ===
==== Group A ====
Team	Pld	W	D	L	GF	GA	GD	Pts
(Vanuatu) Ifira Black Bird	3	3	0	0	3	0	+3	9
(Vanuatu) Amicale FC	3	2	0	1	7	2	+5	6
(Vanuatu) Erakor Golden Star	3	1	0	2	2	4	−2	3
(Vanuatu) Narak Tegapu	3	0	0	3	2	8	−6	0

5 September 2014
15:00

Erakor Golden Star	2–1	Narak Tegapu
Nemani Rogara 25'; Brian Kaltack 70'	Report	Watson Maliwan 89'

Port Vila Municipal Stadium, Port Vila
6 September 2014
13:30

Amicale FC	0–1	Ifira Black Bird
	Report	Vira Kalsakau 15'

Port Vila Municipal Stadium, Port Vila
Referee: Deepak R Mudlia

12 September 2014
15:00

Narak Tegapu	0–1	Ifira Black Bird
	Report	Keroni Napaukarana 25'

Port Vila Municipal Stadium, Port Vila
Referee: Michael Joseph
13 September 2014
13:30

Erakor Golden Star	0–2	Amicale FC
	Report	Hosea Kalmet (o.g.); Dalong Damilip 75'

Port Vila Municipal Stadium, Port Vila
Referee: Alick Lukai

19 September 2014
15:00

Amicale FC	5–1	Narak Tegapu
Osea Vakatalesau 15', 40'; Sanni Issa 25', 30'; Justin Koka 75'	Report	John Namani 89'

Port Vila Municipal Stadium, Port Vila
20 September 2014
13:30

Erakor Golden Star	0–1	Ifira Black Bird
	Report	Vira Kalsakau 37'

Port Vila Municipal Stadium, Port Vila

==== Group B ====
Team	Pld	W	D	L	GF	GA	GD	Pts
(Vanuatu) Tafea	3	2	1	0	7	3	+4	7
(Vanuatu) Tupuji Imere	3	1	2	0	5	2	+3	5
(Vanuatu) Spirit 08	3	1	1	1	3	3	0	4
(Vanuatu) Shepherds United	3	0	0	3	1	8	−7	0

6 September 2014
12:00

Shepherds United	0–1	Spirit 08
	Report	Terry Ray 71'

Port Vila Municipal Stadium, Port Vila
6 September 2014
15:00

Tafea	1–1	Tupuji Imere
Bong Kalo 65'	Report	Rodney Serveux 20'

Port Vila Municipal Stadium, Port Vila

13 September 2014
12:00

Spirit 08	1–2	Tafea
Goden Tenene 86'	Report	Ignace Iamak 15'; Robert Tasso 36'

Port Vila Municipal Stadium, Port Vila
Referee: Anderson Tor
13 September 2014
15:00

Tupuji Imere	3–0	Shepherds United
Max Malas 55', 80'; Rodney Serveux 70'	Report

Port Vila Municipal Stadium, Port Vila
Referee: George Bruce

20 September 2014
12:00

Shepherds United	1–4	Tafea
Daniel Michel 47'	Report	Moses Kalotang 10'; Ignace Iamak 20', 47'; Alista Kalip 80'

Port Vila Municipal Stadium, Port Vila
20 September 2014
15:00

Tupuji Imere	1–1	Spirit 08
Malon Kaltanak 54'	Report	Leon Molly 28'

Port Vila Municipal Stadium, Port Vila

=== Playoffs ===
==== Semi-finals ====
11 October 2014
1:00 PM

Tupuji Imere	2–4	Ifira Black Bird
Johnny Sope 4'; Rodney Serveux 55'	Report	Vira Kalsakau 23', 30'; Dunstan Quanafia 38', 75'

Port Vila Municipal Stadium, Port Vila

11 October 2014
3:00 PM

Tafea	1–1 (a.e.t.)	Amicale
Bong Kalo 46'	Report	Jackson Tasso 70'
Penalties
	5–4

Port Vila Municipal Stadium, Port Vila

==== Grand Final ====
25 October 2014
15:30

Ifira Black Bird	0–3	Tafea
	Report

Port Vila Municipal Stadium, Port Vila
Referee: Mahit Chilia

=== Top goalscorers ===
Rank	Player	Team	Goals
1	Vira Kalsakau	Ifira Black Bird	4
2	Rodney Serveux	Tupuji Imere	3
3	Osea Vakatalesau	Amicale FC	2
3	Sanni Issa	Amicale FC	2
3	Dunstan Quanafia	Ifira Black Bird	2
3	Bong Kalo	Tafea	2
3	Ignace Iamak	Tafea	2
3	Max Malas	Tupuji Imere	2
