= Malampa Revivors F.C. =

Association football club in Vanuatu

Malampa Revivors
- Full name: Malampa Revivors Football Club
- Nickname: Malampa
- Founded: 2010; 16 years ago
- Ground: Luganville Soccer City Stadium; Luganville, Vanuatu
- Capacity: 6,000
- President: Steven Ham
- Manager: Kaison Maki
- League: Luganville Premier Football League
| Home colours | Away colours |

Malampa Revivors is a professional association football club from Luganville, Vanuatu. It is the most successful club outside of Port Vila.

== History ==
Malampa Revivors was founded in 2010 by Elder Shem Dahmassing, within the Centenary Presbyterian Church Sarakata, Luganville. The club has its focus on promoting and bringing up youths in religious aspects, together with football. Malampa Revivors made headlines when they reached the final of the 2015 VFF National Super League after a 2–1 victory over Ifira Black Bird. In the final they lost to Amicale, but because of the OFC Champions League new format, Malampa also qualified.

== Achievements ==
Continental

- OFC Champions League:

2017 OFC Champions League: Group stage
2019 OFC Champions League: Group stage

National

- VFF National Super League:
  Winners (1): 2014
  Runners up (1): 2015
  Third (1): 2016
  Runners-up (1): 2017

Area League

- Luganville League Premiere Division

Champions (3): 2014, 2015, 2016
Runners-up (2): 2012, 2013

- Brisk Cup

Champions (2): 2011, 2013

- Jules Cup

Champions (1): 2016

- Independence Cup

Champions (2): 2013, 2014

== Rivalry ==
Malampa Revivors FC's rival is Vaum United in a domestic level. In the Luganville Football League, they have clashed in numerous finals.

== Managers ==
- (Vanuatu) Steve Ham (2011–2016)
- (Vanuatu) Percy Avock (2016–2017)
- (Vanuatu) Kaison Maki (2019)
