= Luganville Soccer Stadium =

Sports venue in Luganville, Vanuatu

Soccer City Stadium
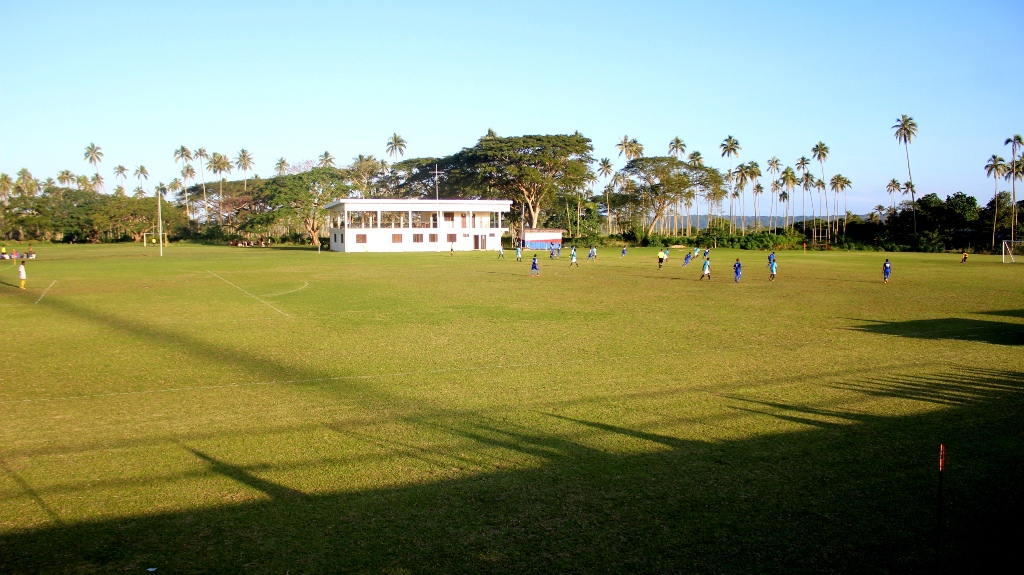
- Interactive map of Soccer City Stadium
- Coordinates: 15.508°S 167.192°E
- Capacity: 6,000
- Event: Sports

Luganville Soccer City Stadium is a sports stadium located in Luganville, Vanuatu. It is the main stadium for the Luganville Football Association's TVL League. The stadium also hosts the latest FIFA Goal Project, the Northern Region Football Academy.

Renamed Luganville Soccer City Stadium in 2013 from Chapuis Stadium, it was the venue for the 2016 Vanuatu National Games events.
