= Nalkutan F.C. =

Association football club in Vanuatu

- Full name: Nalkutan Football Club
- Nickname: The Boys from the south
- Founded: 1963
- Ground: Lamenu Stadium; Tanna, Vanuatu
- Capacity: 2,000
- Manager: Lakar Silas
- League: Tanna Premier Football League
- 2016: 1st
Home colours	Away colours

Nalkutan F.C. is a Vanuatuan football team based in Tanna. They are known to be the second non-Port Vila based club that has qualified for the OFC Champions League.

== History ==
Nalkutan was founded in 1963. However, there is not much known about the first 50 years. However, in 2011 Nalkutan won the VFF TVL cup after beating Sia-Raga 1-0. This was the first time since 1980 that a non-Port Vila club has won the cup. In 2016 they made headlines throughout the Oceania Region when they won the VFF National Super League which meant that they had qualified for the 2018 OFC Champions League for the first time in the history of the club.

== Achievements ==
- VFF National Super League
  - Champions (1): 2016
