= 2017 FIFA U-20 World Cup squads =

FIFA championship roster

The following is the squad list for the 2017 FIFA U-20 World Cup. Each squad consisted of 21 players in total, three of whom had to be goalkeepers.

Players names marked in bold have been capped at full international level.

== Group A ==
=== South Korea ===
Head coach: (South Korea) Shin Tae-yong

No.	Pos.	Player	Date of birth (age)	Club
1	GK	**Song Bum-keun**	15 October 1997 (aged 19)	(Korea Football Association) Korea University
2	DF	**Yoon Jong-gyu**	20 March 1998 (aged 19)	(Korea Football Association) FC Seoul
3	DF	Woo Chan-yang	27 April 1997 (aged 20)	(Korea Football Association) Pohang Steelers
4	DF	Jeong Tae-wook	16 May 1997 (aged 20)	(Korea Football Association) Ajou University
5	DF	Lee Sang-min	1 January 1998 (aged 19)	(Korea Football Association) Soongsil University
6	MF	Lee Seung-mo	30 March 1998 (aged 19)	(Korea Football Association) Pohang Steelers
7	MF	**Lee Jin-hyun**	26 August 1997 (aged 19)	(Korea Football Association) Sungkyunkwan University
8	MF	Han Chan-hee	17 March 1997 (aged 20)	(Korea Football Association) Jeonnam Dragons
9	FW	**Cho Young-wook**	5 February 1999 (aged 18)	(Korea Football Association) Korea University
10	MF	**Lee Seung-woo**	6 January 1998 (aged 19)	(Royal Spanish Football Federation) Barcelona Juvenil A
11	FW	Ha Seung-un	4 May 1998 (aged 19)	(Korea Football Association) Yonsei University
12	GK	Ahn Joon-soo	28 January 1998 (aged 19)	(Japan Football Association) Cerezo Osaka
13	DF	Lee You-hyeon	8 February 1997 (aged 20)	(Korea Football Association) Jeonnam Dragons
14	MF	**Paik Seung-ho**	17 March 1997 (aged 20)	(Royal Spanish Football Federation) Barcelona B
15	DF	Kim Min-ho	11 June 1997 (aged 19)	(Korea Football Association) Yonsei University
16	MF	Lee Sang-heon	26 February 1998 (aged 19)	(Korea Football Association) Ulsan Hyundai
17	MF	Kang Ji-hoon	6 January 1997 (aged 20)	(Korea Football Association) Yongin University
18	MF	Lim Min-hyeok	5 March 1997 (aged 20)	(Korea Football Association) FC Seoul
19	DF	Kim Seung-woo	25 March 1998 (aged 19)	(Korea Football Association) Yonsei University
20	DF	Lee Jung-moon	18 March 1998 (aged 19)	(Korea Football Association) Yonsei University
21	GK	Lee Jun	14 July 1997 (aged 19)	(Korea Football Association) Yonsei University

=== Guinea ===
Head coach: (Guinea) Mandiou Diallo

No.	Pos.	Player	Date of birth (age)	Club
1	GK	**Sékouba Camara**	22 January 1997 (aged 20)	(Guinean Football Federation) Atlético Coléah
2	DF	Salif Sylla	5 December 1998 (aged 18)	(Guinean Football Federation) Kaloum
3	DF	Mamadouba Diaby	16 February 1997 (aged 20)	(Guinean Football Federation) Kaloum
4	MF	Oumar Touré	18 September 1998 (aged 18)	(Italian Football Federation) Juventus
5	DF	Mohamed Camara	1 November 1998 (aged 18)	(Guinean Football Federation) Fello Star
6	DF	Mohamed Didé Fofana	8 April 1998 (aged 19)	(Guinean Football Federation) Hafia
7	MF	**Mohamed Ali Camara**	28 August 1997 (aged 19)	(Guinean Football Federation) Horoya AC
8	MF	Ibrahima Sory Soumah	1 January 1998 (aged 19)	(Guinean Football Federation) Fello Star
9	FW	**Momo Yansane**	29 July 1997 (aged 19)	(Guinean Football Federation) Hafia
10	MF	**Morlaye Sylla**	27 July 1998 (aged 18)	(Portuguese Football Federation) Arouca
11	DF	**Jean Charles Fernandez**	20 January 1998 (aged 19)	(French Football Federation) Ajaccio
12	FW	Mohamed Coumbassa	5 June 1999 (aged 17)	(Guinean Football Federation) Wakriya
13	DF	**Daouda Camara**	20 August 1997 (aged 19)	(Guinean Football Federation) Hafia
14	DF	Yamoussa Camara	13 May 1998 (aged 19)	(Guinean Football Federation) Kaloum
15	MF	**Mamadou Kané**	22 January 1997 (aged 20)	(Guinean Football Federation) Kaloum
16	GK	**Moussa Camara**	27 November 1998 (aged 18)	(Guinean Football Federation) Horoya
17	FW	Mamady Barry	22 November 1997 (aged 19)	(Guinean Football Federation) Soumba
18	MF	Alsény Soumah	16 May 1998 (aged 19)	(Portuguese Football Federation) Arouca
19	MF	Naby Bangoura	29 March 1998 (aged 19)	(Portuguese Football Federation) Vizela
20	FW	**Jules Keita**	20 July 1998 (aged 18)	(French Football Federation) Bastia
21	GK	Fodé David Kaba	15 August 1998 (aged 18)	(Guinean Football Federation) Hafia

=== Argentina ===
Head coach: (Argentina) Claudio Úbeda

No.	Pos.	Player	Date of birth (age)	Club
1	GK	Franco Petroli	11 June 1998 (aged 18)	(Argentine Football Association) River Plate
2	DF	**Juan Foyth**	12 January 1998 (aged 19)	(Argentine Football Association) Estudiantes La Plata
3	DF	Milton Valenzuela	13 August 1998 (aged 18)	(Argentine Football Association) Newell's Old Boys
4	DF	**Gonzalo Montiel**	1 January 1997 (aged 20)	(Argentine Football Association) River Plate
5	MF	**Santiago Ascacíbar**	25 February 1997 (aged 20)	(Argentine Football Association) Estudiantes La Plata
6	DF	**Marcos Senesi**	10 May 1997 (aged 20)	(Argentine Football Association) San Lorenzo
7	FW	Marcelo Torres	6 November 1997 (aged 19)	(Argentine Football Association) Boca Juniors
8	MF	**Exequiel Palacios**	5 October 1998 (aged 18)	(Argentine Football Association) River Plate
9	FW	**Lautaro Martínez**	22 August 1997 (aged 19)	(Argentine Football Association) Racing Club
10	FW	Tomás Conechny	30 March 1998 (aged 19)	(Argentine Football Association) San Lorenzo
11	FW	Braian Mansilla	16 April 1997 (aged 20)	(Argentine Football Association) Racing Club
12	GK	Manuel Roffo	4 April 2000 (aged 17)	(Argentine Football Association) Boca Juniors
13	DF	Leonel Mosevich	4 February 1997 (aged 20)	(Argentine Football Association) Argentinos Juniors
14	DF	**Lisandro Martínez**	18 January 1998 (aged 19)	(Argentine Football Association) Newell's Old Boys
15	MF	Santiago Colombatto	17 January 1997 (aged 20)	(Italian Football Federation) Trapani
16	FW	Lucas Rodríguez	27 April 1997 (aged 20)	(Argentine Football Association) Estudiantes La Plata
17	MF	Tomás Belmonte	27 May 1998 (aged 18)	(Argentine Football Association) Lanús
18	FW	Ezequiel Ponce	29 March 1997 (aged 20)	(Royal Spanish Football Federation) Granada
19	MF	**Matías Zaracho**	10 March 1998 (aged 19)	(Argentine Football Association) Racing Club
20	MF	Ignacio Méndez	28 April 1997 (aged 20)	(Argentine Football Association) Argentinos Juniors
21	GK	Marcelo Miño	21 August 1997 (aged 19)	(Argentine Football Association) Rosario Central

=== England ===
On 19 May, Ezri Konsa replaced injured Rico Henry.

Head coach: (England) Paul Simpson

No.	Pos.	Player	Date of birth (age)	Club
1	GK	Freddie Woodman	4 March 1997 (aged 20)	(The Football Association) Newcastle United
2	DF	Jonjoe Kenny	15 March 1997 (aged 20)	(The Football Association) Everton
3	DF	Callum Connolly	23 September 1997 (aged 19)	(The Football Association) Everton
4	MF	**Lewis Cook**	3 February 1997 (aged 20)	(The Football Association) AFC Bournemouth
5	DF	**Fikayo Tomori**	19 December 1997 (aged 19)	(The Football Association) Chelsea
6	DF	Jake Clarke-Salter	22 September 1997 (aged 19)	(The Football Association) Chelsea
7	MF	Josh Onomah	27 April 1997 (aged 20)	(The Football Association) Tottenham Hotspur
8	MF	**Ainsley Maitland-Niles**	29 August 1997 (aged 19)	(The Football Association) Arsenal
9	FW	Adam Armstrong	10 February 1997 (aged 20)	(The Football Association) Newcastle United
10	FW	**Dominic Solanke**	14 September 1997 (aged 19)	(The Football Association) Chelsea
11	FW	**Ademola Lookman**	20 October 1997 (aged 19)	(The Football Association) Everton
12	DF	**Ezri Konsa**	23 October 1997 (aged 19)	(The Football Association) Charlton Athletic
13	GK	**Dean Henderson**	12 March 1997 (aged 20)	(The Football Association) Manchester United
14	DF	**Kyle Walker-Peters**	13 April 1997 (aged 20)	(The Football Association) Tottenham Hotspur
15	DF	Dael Fry	30 August 1997 (aged 19)	(The Football Association) Middlesbrough
16	FW	**Dominic Calvert-Lewin**	16 March 1997 (aged 20)	(The Football Association) Everton
17	FW	Harrison Chapman	5 November 1997 (aged 19)	(The Football Association) Middlesbrough
18	MF	Kieran Dowell	10 October 1997 (aged 19)	(The Football Association) Everton
19	MF	Sheyi Ojo	19 June 1997 (aged 19)	(The Football Association) Liverpool
20	MF	Ovie Ejaria	18 November 1997 (aged 19)	(The Football Association) Liverpool
21	GK	**Luke Southwood**	6 December 1997 (aged 19)	(The Football Association) Reading

== Group B ==
=== Venezuela ===
Head coach: (Venezuela) Rafael Dudamel

No.	Pos.	Player	Date of birth (age)	Club
1	GK	**Wuilker Faríñez**	15 February 1998 (aged 19)	(Venezuelan Football Federation) Caracas FC
2	DF	Williams Velásquez	4 April 1997 (aged 20)	(Venezuelan Football Federation) Estudiantes de Caracas
3	DF	Eduin Quero	22 April 1997 (aged 20)	(Venezuelan Football Federation) Deportivo Táchira
4	DF	**Nahuel Ferraresi**	19 November 1998 (aged 18)	(Venezuelan Football Federation) Deportivo Táchira
5	DF	José Hernández	26 June 1997 (aged 19)	(Venezuelan Football Federation) Caracas FC
6	MF	**Christian Makoun**	5 March 2000 (aged 17)	(Venezuelan Football Federation) Zamora
7	FW	**Adalberto Peñaranda**	31 May 1997 (aged 19)	(Royal Spanish Football Federation) Málaga
8	MF	**Yangel Herrera**	7 January 1998 (aged 19)	(United States Soccer Federation) New York City
9	FW	Ronaldo Peña	10 March 1997 (aged 20)	(Royal Spanish Football Federation) Las Palmas Atlético
10	MF	**Yeferson Soteldo**	30 June 1997 (aged 19)	(Football Federation of Chile) Huachipato
11	FW	Ronaldo Chacón	18 February 1998 (aged 19)	(Venezuelan Football Federation) Caracas FC
12	GK	**Joel Graterol**	15 May 1997 (aged 20)	(Venezuelan Football Federation) Carabobo
13	FW	**Jan Carlos Hurtado**	5 March 2000 (aged 17)	(Venezuelan Football Federation) Deportivo Táchira
14	MF	Heber García	27 March 1997 (aged 20)	(Uruguayan Football Association) Sud América
15	FW	**Samuel Sosa**	17 December 1999 (aged 17)	(Venezuelan Football Federation) Deportivo Táchira
16	MF	**Ronaldo Lucena**	27 February 1997 (aged 20)	(Venezuelan Football Federation) Zamora
17	DF	**Josua Mejías**	1 August 1997 (aged 19)	(Venezuelan Football Federation) Carabobo
18	MF	Luis Ruiz	3 August 1997 (aged 19)	(Venezuelan Football Federation) Zulia FC
19	FW	**Sergio Córdova**	9 August 1997 (aged 19)	(Venezuelan Football Federation) Caracas FC
20	DF	**Ronald Hernández**	21 September 1997 (aged 19)	(Venezuelan Football Federation) Zamora
21	GK	Rafael Sánchez	1 February 1998 (aged 19)	(Venezuelan Football Federation) Deportivo Táchira

=== Germany ===
Head coach: (Germany) Guido Streichsbier

No.	Pos.	Player	Date of birth (age)	Club
1	GK	Svend Brodersen	22 March 1997 (aged 20)	(German Football Association) FC St. Pauli
2	DF	Phil Neumann	8 July 1997 (aged 19)	(German Football Association) Schalke 04
3	DF	Dominik Schad	4 March 1997 (aged 20)	(German Football Association) Greuther Fürth
4	DF	**Frederic Ananou**	20 September 1997 (aged 19)	(Royal Dutch Football Association) Roda JC
5	DF	Benedikt Gimber	19 February 1997 (aged 20)	(German Football Association) Karlsruher SC
6	MF	Gino Fechner	5 September 1997 (aged 19)	(German Football Association) RB Leipzig
7	MF	Amara Condé	6 January 1997 (aged 20)	(German Football Association) VfL Wolfsburg
8	MF	**Suat Serdar**	11 April 1997 (aged 20)	(German Football Association) Mainz 05
9	FW	Fabian Reese	29 November 1997 (aged 19)	(German Football Association) Karlsruher SC
10	FW	Philipp Ochs	17 April 1997 (aged 20)	(German Football Association) 1899 Hoffenheim
11	DF	**Maximilian Mittelstädt**	18 March 1997 (aged 20)	(German Football Association) Hertha BSC
12	GK	Moritz Nicolas	21 October 1997 (aged 19)	(German Football Association) Borussia Mönchengladbach
13	DF	Matthias Bader	17 June 1997 (aged 19)	(German Football Association) Karlsruher SC
14	DF	**Jordan Torunarigha**	7 August 1997 (aged 19)	(German Football Association) Hertha BSC
15	DF	Jannes Horn	6 February 1997 (aged 20)	(German Football Association) VfL Wolfsburg
16	MF	**Florian Neuhaus**	16 March 1997 (aged 20)	(German Football Association) 1860 Munich
17	FW	Emmanuel Iyoha	11 October 1997 (aged 19)	(German Football Association) Fortuna Düsseldorf
18	MF	Malcolm Badu	23 June 1997 (aged 19)	(German Football Association) VfL Wolfsburg
19	FW	Törles Knöll	13 September 1997 (aged 19)	(German Football Association) Hamburger SV
20	FW	Jonas Arweiler	10 April 1997 (aged 20)	(German Football Association) Borussia Dortmund
21	GK	Dominik Reimann	18 June 1997 (aged 19)	(German Football Association) Borussia Dortmund

=== Vanuatu ===
Head coach: (Montenegro) Dejan Gluščević

No.	Pos.	Player	Date of birth (age)	Club
1	GK	Daniel Alick	28 December 1998 (aged 18)	(Vanuatu Football Federation) ABM Galaxy
2	DF	**Selwyn Vatu**	13 June 1998 (aged 18)	(Vanuatu Football Federation) Shepherds United
3	DF	Lency Philip	8 June 1997 (aged 19)	(Vanuatu Football Federation) Northern Region Academy
4	DF	**Jason Thomas**	20 January 1997 (aged 20)	(Vanuatu Football Federation) Erakor Golden Star
5	DF	**Joseph Iaruel**	25 January 1998 (aged 19)	(Vanuatu Football Federation) Amicale
6	MF	**Claude Aru**	25 April 1997 (aged 20)	(Vanuatu Football Federation) Malampa Revivors
7	FW	Bethuel Ollie	19 August 1997 (aged 19)	(Vanuatu Football Federation) Northern Region Academy
8	MF	**Jayson Timatua**	27 December 1998 (aged 18)	(Vanuatu Football Federation) Shepherds United
9	FW	**Ronaldo Wilkins**	30 December 1999 (aged 17)	(Vanuatu Football Federation) Sia-Raga
10	MF	**Bong Kalo**	18 January 1997 (aged 20)	(Vanuatu Football Federation) Tafea
11	MF	Godine Tenene	3 March 1998 (aged 19)	(Vanuatu Football Federation) Spirit 08
12	GK	**Dick Taiwia**	28 December 1997 (aged 19)	(Vanuatu Football Federation) Ifira Black Bird
13	DF	Denly Ben	6 February 1998 (aged 19)	(Vanuatu Football Federation) Northern Region Academy
14	DF	Reginald Ravo	25 August 1997 (aged 19)	(Vanuatu Football Federation) Northern Region Academy
15	DF	Gregory Patrick	30 April 1998 (aged 19)	(Vanuatu Football Federation) Malampa Revivors
16	MF	Frederick Massing	11 September 1998 (aged 18)	(Vanuatu Football Federation) Malampa Revivors
17	MF	John Wohale	9 July 1997 (aged 19)	(Vanuatu Football Federation) Northern Region Academy
18	FW	**Jonathan Spokeyjack**	13 November 1998 (aged 18)	(Vanuatu Football Federation) Shepherds United
19	FW	Abednigo Sau	28 July 1998 (aged 18)	(Vanuatu Football Federation) Sia-Raga
20	FW	**Azariah Soromon**	1 March 1999 (aged 18)	(Vanuatu Football Federation) Tupuji Imere
21	GK	Andreas Duch	12 October 1998 (aged 18)	(Vanuatu Football Federation) Spirit 08

=== Mexico ===
Head coach: (Mexico) Marco Antonio Ruiz

No.	Pos.	Player	Date of birth (age)	Club
1	GK	Joel García	12 April 1998 (aged 19)	(Mexican Football Federation) Santos Laguna
2	DF	Diego Cortés	18 June 1998 (aged 18)	(Mexican Football Federation) Guadalajara
3	DF	**Edson Álvarez**	24 October 1997 (aged 19)	(Mexican Football Federation) América
4	DF	Juan Aguayo	11 March 1997 (aged 20)	(Mexican Football Federation) Guadalajara
5	DF	Alejandro Mayorga	29 May 1997 (aged 19)	(Mexican Football Federation) Guadalajara
6	MF	**Alan Cervantes**	17 January 1998 (aged 19)	(Mexican Football Federation) Guadalajara
7	FW	**Uriel Antuna**	21 August 1997 (aged 19)	(Mexican Football Federation) Santos Laguna
8	MF	Pablo López	7 January 1998 (aged 19)	(Mexican Football Federation) Pachuca
9	FW	Ronaldo Cisneros	8 January 1997 (aged 20)	(Mexican Football Federation) Santos Laguna
10	FW	Claudio Zamudio	30 March 1998 (aged 19)	(Mexican Football Federation) Morelia
11	FW	Kevin Magaña	2 January 1998 (aged 19)	(Mexican Football Federation) Guadalajara
12	GK	Fernando Hernández	2 January 1998 (aged 19)	(Mexican Football Federation) Monterrey
13	DF	Brayton Vázquez	5 March 1998 (aged 19)	(Mexican Football Federation) Atlas
14	MF	**José Joaquín Esquivel**	7 January 1998 (aged 19)	(Mexican Football Federation) Pachuca
15	DF	Ulises Torres	17 February 1998 (aged 19)	(Mexican Football Federation) América
16	MF	**Francisco Venegas**	16 July 1998 (aged 18)	(Football Federation of Chile) Everton de Viña del Mar
17	MF	Kevin Lara	18 April 1998 (aged 19)	(Mexican Football Federation) Santos Laguna
18	MF	Diego Aguilar	13 January 1997 (aged 20)	(Mexican Football Federation) BUAP
19	FW	**Paolo Yrizar**	6 August 1997 (aged 19)	(Mexican Football Federation) Querétaro
20	FW	**Eduardo Aguirre**	3 August 1998 (aged 18)	(Mexican Football Federation) Santos Laguna
21	GK	Abraham Romero	18 February 1998 (aged 19)	(Mexican Football Federation) Pachuca

== Group C ==
=== Zambia ===
Head coach: (Zambia) Beston Chambeshi

No.	Pos.	Player	Date of birth (age)	Club
1	GK	Mangani Banda	13 July 1997 (aged 19)	(Football Association of Zambia) Zanaco
2	DF	**Moses Nyondo**	5 July 1997 (aged 19)	(Football Association of Zambia) Nkana
3	DF	Prosper Chiluya	2 April 1998 (aged 19)	(Football Association of Zambia) Lumwana Radiants
4	DF	Benson Chali	2 December 1997 (aged 19)	(Football Association of Zambia) Forrest Rangers
5	DF	Solomon Sakala	28 April 1997 (aged 20)	(Football Association of Zambia) NAPSA Stars
6	DF	Boston Muchindu	6 June 1997 (aged 19)	(Football Association of Zambia) Nkana
7	MF	Musonda Siame	7 December 1998 (aged 18)	(Football Association of Zambia) Kafue Celtic
8	MF	Harrison Chisala	4 August 1997 (aged 19)	(Football Association of Zambia) Nkana
9	FW	**Conlyde Luchanga**	11 March 1997 (aged 20)	(Football Association of Zambia) Lusaka Dynamos
10	FW	**Fashion Sakala**	14 March 1997 (aged 20)	(Russian Football Union) Spartak-2 Moscow
11	MF	**Enock Mwepu**	1 January 1998 (aged 19)	(Football Association of Zambia) NAPSA Stars
12	MF	**Emmanuel Banda**	29 September 1997 (aged 19)	(Portuguese Football Federation) Esmoriz
13	DF	**Shemmy Mayembe**	22 November 1997 (aged 19)	(Football Association of Zambia) ZESCO United
14	FW	**Edward Chilufya**	17 September 1999 (aged 17)	(Football Association of Zambia) Mpande Youth Academy
15	DF	Edward Tembo	26 March 1997 (aged 20)	(Football Association of Zambia) Gomes
16	GK	Samson Banda	1 May 1997 (aged 20)	(Football Association of Zambia) ZESCO United
17	MF	Kenneth Kalunga	18 January 1997 (aged 20)	(Danish Football Association) Ikast
18	GK	Jim James Phiri	7 September 1998 (aged 18)	(Football Association of Zambia) Lusaka Dynamos
19	MF	**Ngosa Sunzu**	19 June 1998 (aged 18)	(Israel Football Association) Hapoel Ra'anana
20	FW	**Patson Daka**	9 October 1998 (aged 18)	(Austrian Football Association) FC Liefering
21	MF	Boyd Musonda	12 May 1997 (aged 20)	(Football Association of Zambia) Zanaco

=== Portugal ===
On 2 May 2017, Portugal announced their 21-man final list. On 9 May, Hélder Ferreira replaced the injured Aurélio Buta.

Head coach: (Portugal) Emílio Peixe

No.	Pos.	Player	Date of birth (age)	Club
1	GK	Pedro Silva	13 February 1997 (aged 20)	(Portuguese Football Federation) Sporting CP B
2	DF	Pedro Empis	1 February 1997 (aged 20)	(Portuguese Football Federation) Sporting CP B
3	DF	**Rúben Dias**	14 May 1997 (aged 20)	(Portuguese Football Federation) Benfica B
4	DF	Ferro	26 March 1997 (aged 20)	(Portuguese Football Federation) Benfica B
5	DF	Yuri Ribeiro	24 January 1997 (aged 20)	(Portuguese Football Federation) Benfica B
6	MF	Pêpê	20 May 1997 (aged 20)	(Portuguese Football Federation) Benfica B
7	FW	Diogo Gonçalves	6 February 1997 (aged 20)	(Portuguese Football Federation) Benfica B
8	MF	Pedro Delgado	7 April 1997 (aged 20)	(Portuguese Football Federation) Sporting CP B
9	FW	André Ribeiro	9 June 1997 (aged 19)	(Swiss Football Association) Zürich II
10	MF	Xadas	2 December 1997 (aged 19)	(Portuguese Football Federation) Braga B
11	FW	Hélder Ferreira	5 April 1997 (aged 20)	(Portuguese Football Federation) Vitória de Guimarães B
12	GK	Luís Maximiano	5 January 1999 (aged 18)	(Portuguese Football Federation) Sporting CP Juniors
13	DF	Jorge Fernandes	2 April 1997 (aged 20)	(Portuguese Football Federation) Porto B
14	MF	Florentino Luís	19 August 1999 (aged 17)	(Portuguese Football Federation) Benfica B
15	DF	**Diogo Dalot**	18 March 1999 (aged 18)	(Portuguese Football Federation) Porto B
16	MF	Miguel Luís	27 February 1999 (aged 18)	(Portuguese Football Federation) Sporting CP Juniors
17	FW	Xande Silva	16 March 1997 (aged 20)	(Portuguese Football Federation) Vitória de Guimarães
18	FW	José Gomes	8 April 1999 (aged 18)	(Portuguese Football Federation) Benfica B
19	MF	Bruno Costa	19 April 1997 (aged 20)	(Portuguese Football Federation) Porto B
20	MF	**Gedson Fernandes**	9 January 1999 (aged 18)	(Portuguese Football Federation) Benfica B
21	GK	**Diogo Costa**	19 September 1999 (aged 17)	(Portuguese Football Federation) Porto Juniors

=== Iran ===
Head coach: (Iran) Amir Hossein Peiravani

No.	Pos.	Player	Date of birth (age)	Club
1	GK	Nima Mirzazad	27 February 1997 (aged 20)	(Football Federation Islamic Republic of Iran) Gostaresh Foulad
2	DF	Ali Shahsavari	24 November 1997 (aged 19)	(Football Federation Islamic Republic of Iran) Gol Gohar Sirjan
3	DF	Mehran Derakhshan Mehr	10 August 1998 (aged 18)	(Football Federation Islamic Republic of Iran) Zob Ahan
4	DF	Aref Gholami	19 April 1997 (aged 20)	(Football Federation Islamic Republic of Iran) Sepahan
5	DF	Nima Taheri	15 April 1997 (aged 20)	(Football Federation Islamic Republic of Iran) Zob Ahan
6	MF	Mohammad Soltani Mehr	4 February 1999 (aged 18)	(Football Federation Islamic Republic of Iran) Saipa
7	MF	Nima Mokhtari	10 May 1998 (aged 19)	(Football Federation Islamic Republic of Iran) Gostaresh
8	DF	Ali Shojaei	27 January 1997 (aged 20)	(Football Federation Islamic Republic of Iran) Saipa
9	FW	Mohammad Mehdi Mehdikhani	28 July 1997 (aged 19)	(Football Federation Islamic Republic of Iran) Niroo Zamini
10	MF	Reza Shekari	31 May 1998 (aged 18)	(Football Federation Islamic Republic of Iran) Zob Ahan
11	FW	Reza Jafari	4 May 1997 (aged 20)	(Football Federation Islamic Republic of Iran) Saipa
12	GK	Shahab Adeli	19 January 1997 (aged 20)	(Football Federation Islamic Republic of Iran) Naft Tehran
13	DF	Abolfazl Razzaghpour	17 September 1997 (aged 19)	(Football Federation Islamic Republic of Iran) Nassaji
14	DF	Sina Khadempour	9 January 1997 (aged 20)	(Football Federation Islamic Republic of Iran) Naft Tehran
15	FW	Amir Roustaei	5 August 1997 (aged 19)	(Football Federation Islamic Republic of Iran) Paykan
16	MF	**Omid Noorafkan**	9 April 1997 (aged 20)	(Football Federation Islamic Republic of Iran) Esteghlal
17	MF	Hossein Saki	10 May 1997 (aged 20)	(Football Federation Islamic Republic of Iran) Sanat Naft Abadan
18	FW	Mohammad Aghajanpour	20 April 1997 (aged 20)	(Football Federation Islamic Republic of Iran) Aluminium Arak
19	MF	**Mehdi Ghayedi**	5 December 1998 (aged 18)	(Football Federation Islamic Republic of Iran) Iranjavan
20	MF	Aref Aghasi	2 January 1997 (aged 20)	(Football Federation Islamic Republic of Iran) Tractor Sazi
21	GK	Mahdi Mohammadian	5 March 1997 (aged 20)	(Football Federation Islamic Republic of Iran) Niroo Zamini

=== Costa Rica ===
Head coach: (Argentina) Marcelo Herrera

No.	Pos.	Player	Date of birth (age)	Club
1	GK	Mario Sequeira	9 January 1997 (aged 20)	(Costa Rican Football Federation) Saprissa
2	DF	Diego Mesén	28 March 1999 (aged 18)	(Costa Rican Football Federation) Alajuelense
3	DF	**Pablo Arboine**	3 April 1998 (aged 19)	(Costa Rican Football Federation) Santos de Guápiles
4	DF	**Ian Smith**	6 March 1998 (aged 19)	(Costa Rican Football Federation) Santos de Guápiles
5	DF	Esteban González	30 January 1998 (aged 19)	(Costa Rican Football Federation) Saprissa
6	MF	Luis Hernández	7 February 1998 (aged 19)	(Costa Rican Football Federation) Saprissa
7	FW	**Barlon Sequeira**	25 May 1998 (aged 18)	(Costa Rican Football Federation) Alajuelense
8	FW	**Jimmy Marín**	8 October 1997 (aged 19)	(Costa Rican Football Federation) Herediano
9	FW	Jostin Daly	23 April 1998 (aged 19)	(Costa Rican Football Federation) Herediano
10	MF	Jonathan Martínez	19 March 1998 (aged 19)	(Costa Rican Football Federation) Santos de Guápiles
11	FW	**Randall Leal**	14 January 1997 (aged 20)	(Royal Belgian Football Association) Mechelen
12	MF	Pablo Arguedas	21 April 1997 (aged 20)	(Costa Rican Football Federation) Carmelita
13	GK	Erick Pineda	2 April 1997 (aged 20)	(Costa Rican Football Federation) Alajuelense
14	MF	**Cristopher Núñez**	8 December 1997 (aged 19)	(Costa Rican Football Federation) Cartaginés
15	FW	**Bernald Alfaro**	26 January 1997 (aged 20)	(Costa Rican Football Federation) Carmelita
16	MF	**Suhander Zúñiga**	15 January 1997 (aged 20)	(Costa Rican Football Federation) Carmelita
17	DF	Esteban Espinoza	22 November 1997 (aged 19)	(Costa Rican Football Federation) Belén
18	GK	Bryan Segura	14 January 1997 (aged 20)	(Costa Rican Football Federation) Pérez Zeledón
19	DF	**Yostin Salinas**	14 September 1998 (aged 18)	(Costa Rican Football Federation) Saprissa
20	MF	Eduardo Juárez	22 September 1998 (aged 18)	(Costa Rican Football Federation) Alajuelense
21	MF	**Gerson Torres**	28 August 1997 (aged 19)	(Mexican Football Federation) América

== Group D ==
=== South Africa ===
On 17 May, Sirgio Kammies replaced the injured Phakamani Mahlambi.

Head Coach: (South Africa) Thabo Senong

No.	Pos.	Player	Date of birth (age)	Club
1	GK	Sanele Tshabalala	12 May 1998 (aged 19)	(South African Football Association) Bidvest Wits
2	DF	Malebogo Modise	6 February 1999 (aged 18)	(South African Football Association) Mamelodi Sundowns
3	DF	Shane Saralina	27 June 1997 (aged 19)	(South African Football Association) Ajax Cape Town
4	MF	**Teboho Mokoena**	24 January 1997 (aged 20)	(South African Football Association) SuperSport United
5	DF	Sandile Mthethwa	14 April 1997 (aged 20)	(South African Football Association) Orlando Pirates
6	MF	**Wiseman Meyiwa**	27 December 1999 (aged 17)	(South African Football Association) Kaizer Chiefs
7	FW	Keletso Makgalwa	3 January 1997 (aged 20)	(South African Football Association) Mamelodi Sundowns
8	MF	Sibongakonke Mbatha	1 January 1998 (aged 19)	(South African Football Association) Bidvest Wits
9	FW	**Liam Jordan**	30 July 1998 (aged 18)	(Portuguese Football Federation) Sporting CP Juniors
10	FW	**Luther Singh**	5 August 1997 (aged 19)	(Portuguese Football Federation) Braga B
11	DF	Sirgio Kammies	7 February 1998 (aged 19)	(South African Football Association) Ajax Cape Town
12	MF	Sipho Mbule	22 March 1998 (aged 19)	(South African Football Association) SuperSport United
13	DF	Thendo Mukumela	30 January 1998 (aged 19)	(South African Football Association) Mamelodi Sundowns
14	DF	**Reeve Frosler**	11 January 1998 (aged 19)	(South African Football Association) Bidvest Wits
15	DF	**Tercious Malepe**	18 February 1997 (aged 20)	(South African Football Association) Orlando Pirates
16	GK	Mondli Mpoto	24 July 1998 (aged 18)	(South African Football Association) SuperSport United
17	MF	Masilakhe Phohlongo	5 May 1997 (aged 20)	(South African Football Association) Ajax Cape Town
18	MF	**Grant Margeman**	3 June 1998 (aged 18)	(South African Football Association) Ajax Cape Town
19	FW	Kobamelo Kodisang	28 August 1999 (aged 17)	(South African Football Association) Platinum Stars
20	GK	Khulekani Kubheka	7 January 1999 (aged 18)	(South African Football Association) Mamelodi Sundowns
21	MF	Thabo Cele	15 January 1997 (aged 20)	(Portuguese Football Federation) Real

=== Japan ===
Head coach: (Japan) Atsushi Uchiyama

No.	Pos.	Player	Date of birth (age)	Club
1	GK	Ryosuke Kojima	30 January 1997 (aged 20)	(Japan Football Association) Waseda University
2	DF	So Fujitani	28 October 1997 (aged 19)	(Japan Football Association) Vissel Kobe
3	DF	**Yūta Nakayama**	16 February 1997 (aged 20)	(Japan Football Association) Kashiwa Reysol
4	DF	**Kō Itakura**	27 January 1997 (aged 20)	(Japan Football Association) Kawasaki Frontale
5	DF	**Takehiro Tomiyasu**	5 November 1998 (aged 18)	(Japan Football Association) Avispa Fukuoka
6	DF	Ryo Hatsuse	10 July 1997 (aged 19)	(Japan Football Association) Gamba Osaka
7	FW	**Ritsu Dōan**	16 June 1998 (aged 18)	(Japan Football Association) Gamba Osaka
8	MF	**Koji Miyoshi**	26 March 1997 (aged 20)	(Japan Football Association) Kawasaki Frontale
9	FW	**Koki Ogawa**	8 August 1997 (aged 19)	(Japan Football Association) Júbilo Iwata
10	MF	Daisuke Sakai	18 January 1997 (aged 20)	(Japan Football Association) Oita Trinita
11	FW	**Keita Endō**	22 November 1997 (aged 19)	(Japan Football Association) Yokohama F. Marinos
12	GK	Go Hatano	25 May 1998 (aged 18)	(Japan Football Association) FC Tokyo
13	FW	**Yuto Iwasaki**	11 June 1998 (aged 18)	(Japan Football Association) Kyoto Sanga
14	FW	**Kyosuke Tagawa**	11 February 1999 (aged 18)	(Japan Football Association) Sagan Tosu
15	DF	**Daiki Sugioka**	8 September 1998 (aged 18)	(Japan Football Association) Shonan Bellmare
16	MF	**Teruki Hara**	30 July 1998 (aged 18)	(Japan Football Association) Albirex Niigata
17	MF	Mizuki Ichimaru	8 May 1997 (aged 20)	(Japan Football Association) Gamba Osaka
18	FW	Akito Takagi	4 August 1997 (aged 19)	(Japan Football Association) Gamba Osaka
19	DF	Kakeru Funaki	13 April 1998 (aged 19)	(Japan Football Association) Cerezo Osaka
20	FW	**Takefusa Kubo**	4 June 2001 (aged 15)	(Japan Football Association) FC Tokyo
21	GK	Louis Yamaguchi	28 May 1998 (aged 18)	(French Football Federation) Lorient

=== Italy ===
Head coach: (Italy) Alberigo Evani

No.	Pos.	Player	Date of birth (age)	Club
1	GK	Alessandro Plizzari	12 March 2000 (aged 17)	(Italian Football Federation) Milan
2	DF	Giuseppe Scalera	26 January 1998 (aged 19)	(Italian Football Federation) Fiorentina
3	DF	**Federico Dimarco**	10 November 1997 (aged 19)	(Italian Football Federation) Empoli
4	MF	**Nicolò Barella**	7 February 1997 (aged 20)	(Italian Football Federation) Cagliari
5	DF	Filippo Romagna	26 May 1997 (aged 19)	(Italian Football Federation) Brescia
6	DF	Mauro Coppolaro	10 March 1997 (aged 20)	(Italian Football Federation) Latina
7	FW	**Riccardo Orsolini**	24 January 1997 (aged 20)	(Italian Football Federation) Ascoli
8	MF	**Rolando Mandragora**	29 June 1997 (aged 19)	(Italian Football Federation) Juventus
9	FW	Andrea Favilli	17 May 1997 (aged 20)	(Italian Football Federation) Ascoli
10	FW	Luca Vido	3 February 1997 (aged 20)	(Italian Football Federation) Cittadella
11	MF	**Matteo Pessina**	21 April 1997 (aged 20)	(Italian Football Federation) Como
12	GK	Andrea Zaccagno	27 May 1997 (aged 19)	(Italian Football Federation) Pro Vercelli
13	DF	Leonardo Sernicola	30 July 1997 (aged 19)	(Italian Football Federation) Fondi
14	DF	Giuseppe Pezzella	29 November 1997 (aged 19)	(Italian Football Federation) Palermo
15	MF	Mattia Vitale	1 October 1997 (aged 19)	(Italian Football Federation) Cesena
16	MF	Francesco Cassata	16 July 1997 (aged 19)	(Italian Football Federation) Ascoli
17	FW	Giuseppe Panico	10 October 1997 (aged 19)	(Italian Football Federation) Cesena
18	MF	Paolo Ghiglione	2 February 1997 (aged 20)	(Italian Football Federation) SPAL
19	DF	Riccardo Marchizza	26 March 1998 (aged 19)	(Italian Football Federation) Roma
20	MF	Alfredo Bifulco	19 January 1997 (aged 20)	(Italian Football Federation) Carpi
21	GK	Samuele Perisan	21 August 1997 (aged 19)	(Italian Football Federation) Udinese

=== Uruguay ===
Head coach: (Uruguay) Fabián Coito

No.	Pos.	Player	Date of birth (age)	Club
1	GK	**Santiago Mele**	6 September 1997 (aged 19)	(Uruguayan Football Association) Fénix
2	DF	**Santiago Bueno**	9 November 1998 (aged 18)	(Royal Spanish Football Federation) Barcelona Juvenil A
3	DF	Emanuel Gularte	30 September 1997 (aged 19)	(Uruguayan Football Association) Wanderers
4	DF	**José Luis Rodríguez**	14 March 1997 (aged 20)	(Uruguayan Football Association) Danubio
5	DF	**Mathías Olivera**	31 October 1997 (aged 19)	(Uruguayan Football Association) Atenas
6	MF	**Marcelo Saracchi**	23 April 1998 (aged 19)	(Uruguayan Football Association) Danubio
7	FW	Joaquín Ardaiz	11 January 1999 (aged 18)	(Uruguayan Football Association) Danubio
8	MF	Carlos Benavídez	30 March 1998 (aged 19)	(Uruguayan Football Association) Defensor Sporting
9	FW	Nicolás Schiappacasse	12 January 1999 (aged 18)	(Royal Spanish Football Federation) Atlético Madrid B
10	FW	Rodrigo Amaral	25 March 1997 (aged 20)	(Uruguayan Football Association) Nacional
11	MF	**Nicolás de la Cruz**	1 June 1997 (aged 19)	(Uruguayan Football Association) Liverpool
12	GK	Francisco Tinaglini	9 November 1998 (aged 18)	(Uruguayan Football Association) River Plate
13	MF	Santiago Viera	4 June 1998 (aged 18)	(Uruguayan Football Association) Liverpool
14	FW	Juan Manuel Boselli	9 November 1999 (aged 17)	(Uruguayan Football Association) Defensor Sporting
15	MF	Facundo Waller	9 April 1997 (aged 20)	(Uruguayan Football Association) Plaza Colonia
16	MF	**Federico Valverde**	22 July 1998 (aged 18)	(Royal Spanish Football Federation) Real Madrid Castilla
17	DF	**Matías Viña**	9 November 1997 (aged 19)	(Uruguayan Football Association) Nacional
18	DF	**Agustín Rogel**	17 October 1997 (aged 19)	(Uruguayan Football Association) Nacional
19	FW	**Agustín Canobbio**	1 October 1998 (aged 18)	(Uruguayan Football Association) Fénix
20	MF	**Rodrigo Bentancur**	25 June 1997 (aged 19)	(Argentine Football Association) Boca Juniors
21	GK	Adriano Freitas	17 June 1997 (aged 19)	(Uruguayan Football Association) Peñarol

== Group E ==
=== France ===
On 21 May, Faitout Maouassa replaced injured Ronaël Pierre-Gabriel.

Head coach: (France) Ludovic Batelli

No.	Pos.	Player	Date of birth (age)	Club
1	GK	Paul Bernardoni	18 April 1997 (aged 20)	(French Football Federation) Bordeaux
2	DF	Enock Kwateng	9 April 1997 (aged 20)	(French Football Federation) Nantes
3	DF	Olivier Boscagli	18 November 1997 (aged 19)	(French Football Federation) Nice
4	DF	**Jérôme Onguéné**	22 December 1997 (aged 19)	(German Football Association) VfB Stuttgart
5	DF	**Issa Diop**	9 January 1997 (aged 20)	(French Football Federation) Toulouse
6	MF	**Jeando Fuchs**	11 October 1997 (aged 19)	(French Football Federation) Sochaux
7	FW	Jean-Kévin Augustin	16 June 1997 (aged 19)	(French Football Federation) Paris Saint-Germain
8	MF	Lucas Tousart	29 April 1997 (aged 20)	(French Football Federation) Lyon
9	MF	**Christopher Nkunku**	14 November 1997 (aged 19)	(French Football Federation) Paris Saint-Germain
10	FW	Allan Saint-Maximin	12 March 1997 (aged 20)	(French Football Federation) Bastia
11	FW	**Marcus Thuram**	6 August 1997 (aged 19)	(French Football Federation) Sochaux
12	FW	Ludovic Blas	31 December 1997 (aged 19)	(French Football Federation) Guingamp
13	DF	Clément Michelin	11 May 1997 (aged 20)	(French Football Federation) Toulouse
14	MF	**Amine Harit**	18 June 1997 (aged 19)	(French Football Federation) Nantes
15	MF	Faitout Maouassa	6 July 1998 (aged 18)	(French Football Federation) Nancy
16	GK	Quentin Braat	6 July 1997 (aged 19)	(French Football Federation) Nantes
17	MF	Denis-Will Poha	28 May 1997 (aged 19)	(French Football Federation) Rennes
18	MF	**Ibrahima Sissoko**	27 October 1997 (aged 19)	(French Football Federation) Brest
19	DF	Yoan Severin	24 January 1997 (aged 20)	(Royal Belgian Football Association) Zulte Waregem
20	FW	Martin Terrier	4 March 1997 (aged 20)	(French Football Federation) Lille
21	GK	**Alban Lafont**	23 January 1999 (aged 18)	(French Football Federation) Toulouse

=== Honduras ===
Head coach: (Honduras) Carlos Tábora

No.	Pos.	Player	Date of birth (age)	Club
1	GK	Javier Delgado	6 November 1998 (aged 18)	(National Autonomous Federation of Football of Honduras) Honduras Progreso
2	DF	**Denil Maldonado**	25 May 1998 (aged 18)	(National Autonomous Federation of Football of Honduras) Motagua
3	DF	**Wesly Decas**	11 August 1999 (aged 17)	(National Autonomous Federation of Football of Honduras) Atlético Independiente
4	DF	Kenneth Hernández	25 May 1997 (aged 19)	(National Autonomous Federation of Football of Honduras) Olimpia
5	DF	Dylan Andrade	8 March 1998 (aged 19)	(National Autonomous Federation of Football of Honduras) Platense
6	DF	Ricky Zapata	23 November 1997 (aged 19)	(National Autonomous Federation of Football of Honduras) Real Sociedad
7	MF	**José Reyes**	5 November 1997 (aged 19)	(National Autonomous Federation of Football of Honduras) Olimpia
8	MF	Erick Arias	30 January 1998 (aged 19)	(National Autonomous Federation of Football of Honduras) Atlético Independiente
9	MF	Foslyn Grant	4 October 1998 (aged 18)	(National Autonomous Federation of Football of Honduras) Motagua
10	MF	**Carlos Pineda**	23 September 1997 (aged 19)	(National Autonomous Federation of Football of Honduras) Olimpia
11	FW	Mario Flores	21 July 1998 (aged 18)	(National Autonomous Federation of Football of Honduras) Real Sociedad
12	GK	Michael Perelló	11 July 1998 (aged 18)	(National Autonomous Federation of Football of Honduras) Marathón
13	MF	José Quiroz	26 May 1997 (aged 19)	(National Autonomous Federation of Football of Honduras) Real España
14	MF	Sendel Cruz	13 December 1998 (aged 18)	(National Autonomous Federation of Football of Honduras) Juticalpa
15	DF	Jalex Sánchez	28 March 1997 (aged 20)	(National Autonomous Federation of Football of Honduras) Real España
16	DF	**José García**	21 September 1998 (aged 18)	(National Autonomous Federation of Football of Honduras) Olimpia
17	FW	Byron Rodríguez	26 August 1997 (aged 19)	(National Autonomous Federation of Football of Honduras) Parrillas One
18	FW	**Darixon Vuelto**	15 January 1998 (aged 19)	(Royal Spanish Football Federation) Tenerife
19	FW	**Douglas Martínez**	5 June 1997 (aged 19)	(United States Soccer Federation) New York Red Bulls II
20	MF	Jorge Álvarez	28 January 1998 (aged 19)	(National Autonomous Federation of Football of Honduras) Olimpia
21	GK	Henry Mashburn	8 February 1999 (aged 18)	(United States Soccer Federation) Weston Fury

=== Vietnam ===
Head coach: (Vietnam) Hoàng Anh Tuấn

No.	Pos.	Player	Date of birth (age)	Club
1	GK	**Bùi Tiến Dũng**	28 February 1997 (aged 20)	(Vietnam Football Federation) FLC Thanh Hóa
2	DF	Đỗ Thanh Thịnh	18 August 1998 (aged 18)	(Vietnam Football Federation) SHB Đà Nẵng
3	DF	Huỳnh Tấn Sinh	6 April 1998 (aged 19)	(Vietnam Football Federation) QNK Quảng Nam
4	DF	**Hồ Tấn Tài**	6 November 1997 (aged 19)	(Vietnam Football Federation) Bình Định
5	DF	**Đoàn Văn Hậu**	19 April 1999 (aged 18)	(Vietnam Football Federation) Hanoi
6	DF	Phan Thanh Hậu	12 January 1997 (aged 20)	(Vietnam Football Federation) Hoàng Anh Gia Lai
7	DF	Nguyễn Trọng Đại	7 April 1997 (aged 20)	(Vietnam Football Federation) Viettel
8	MF	Tống Anh Tỷ	24 January 1997 (aged 20)	(Vietnam Football Federation) Becamex Bình Dương
9	FW	**Hà Đức Chinh**	22 September 1997 (aged 19)	(Vietnam Football Federation) SHB Đà Nẵng
10	MF	**Đinh Thanh Bình**	19 March 1998 (aged 19)	(Vietnam Football Federation) Hoàng Anh Gia Lai
11	MF	Hồ Minh Dĩ	17 February 1998 (aged 19)	(Vietnam Football Federation) Hanoi
12	MF	Lương Hoàng Nam	2 March 1997 (aged 20)	(Vietnam Football Federation) Hoàng Anh Gia Lai
13	GK	Nguyễn Bá Minh Hiếu	23 May 1997 (aged 19)	(Vietnam Football Federation) Hanoi
14	MF	**Nguyễn Hoàng Đức**	11 January 1998 (aged 19)	(Vietnam Football Federation) Viettel
15	FW	**Nguyễn Tiến Linh**	20 October 1997 (aged 19)	(Vietnam Football Federation) Becamex Bình Dương
16	MF	Trần Thanh Sơn	30 December 1997 (aged 19)	(Vietnam Football Federation) Hoàng Anh Gia Lai
17	FW	Trần Thành	8 February 1997 (aged 20)	(Vietnam Football Federation) Huế
18	MF	Dương Văn Hào	15 February 1997 (aged 20)	(Vietnam Football Federation) Viettel
19	MF	**Nguyễn Quang Hải**	12 April 1997 (aged 20)	(Vietnam Football Federation) Hanoi
20	DF	**Trần Đình Trọng**	28 March 1997 (aged 20)	(Vietnam Football Federation) Sài Gòn
21	GK	Đỗ Sỹ Huy	16 April 1998 (aged 19)	(Vietnam Football Federation) Hanoi

=== New Zealand ===
Head coach: (England) Darren Bazeley

No.	Pos.	Player	Date of birth (age)	Club
1	GK	**Michael Woud**	16 January 1999 (aged 18)	(The Football Association) Sunderland
2	DF	**Dane Ingham**	6 August 1999 (aged 17)	(Football Australia) Brisbane Roar
3	DF	Sean Liddicoat	14 May 1997 (aged 20)	(New Zealand Football) Coastal Spirit
4	DF	Luke Johnson	15 April 1998 (aged 19)	(New Zealand Football) Wellington United
5	DF	Hunter Ashworth	8 January 1998 (aged 19)	(United States Soccer Federation) San Francisco Dons
6	MF	**Joe Bell**	27 April 1999 (aged 18)	(United States Soccer Federation) Virginia Cavaliers
7	MF	Connor Probert	6 April 1998 (aged 19)	(United States Soccer Federation) Kentucky Wildcats
8	MF	**Moses Dyer**	21 March 1997 (aged 20)	(Football Australia) Northcote City
9	FW	**Noah Billingsley**	6 August 1997 (aged 19)	(United States Soccer Federation) UC Santa Barbara Gauchos
10	MF	**Clayton Lewis**	12 February 1997 (aged 20)	(New Zealand Football) Auckland City
11	FW	**Henry Cameron**	28 June 1997 (aged 19)	(The Football Association) Blackpool
12	GK	Cameron Brown	9 July 1999 (aged 17)	(New Zealand Football) Waitemata
13	MF	**James McGarry**	9 April 1998 (aged 19)	(New Zealand Football) Wellington Phoenix
14	DF	Midhun Das	23 February 1998 (aged 19)	(New Zealand Football) Wellington United
15	DF	Reese Cox	7 March 1997 (aged 20)	(New Zealand Football) East Coast Bays
16	MF	**Callum McCowatt**	30 April 1999 (aged 18)	(New Zealand Football) Western Suburbs
17	FW	**Logan Rogerson**	28 May 1998 (aged 18)	(New Zealand Football) Wellington Phoenix
18	MF	**Sarpreet Singh**	20 February 1999 (aged 18)	(New Zealand Football) Wellington United
19	FW	**Myer Bevan**	23 April 1997 (aged 20)	(The Football Association) Nike Academy
20	FW	Lucas Imrie	20 May 1998 (aged 19)	(United States Soccer Federation) Loyola Ramblers
21	GK	Conor Tracey	13 April 1997 (aged 20)	(New Zealand Football) Three Kings United

== Group F ==
=== Ecuador ===
Head coach: (Ecuador) Javier Rodríguez

No.	Pos.	Player	Date of birth (age)	Club
1	GK	José Gabriel Cevallos	19 March 1998 (aged 19)	(Ecuadorian Football Federation) Barcelona
2	MF	**Ángelo Preciado**	18 February 1998 (aged 19)	(Ecuadorian Football Federation) Independiente del Valle
3	DF	Joel Quintero	25 September 1998 (aged 18)	(Ecuadorian Football Federation) Emelec
4	DF	Kevin Minda	21 November 1998 (aged 18)	(Ecuadorian Football Federation) LDU Quito
5	MF	Juan Nazareno	18 August 1998 (aged 18)	(Ecuadorian Football Federation) Independiente del Valle
6	DF	**Pervis Estupiñán**	21 January 1998 (aged 19)	(Royal Spanish Football Federation) Granada
7	FW	**Washington Corozo**	9 July 1998 (aged 18)	(Ecuadorian Football Federation) Independiente del Valle
8	MF	Wilter Ayoví	17 April 1997 (aged 20)	(Ecuadorian Football Federation) Independiente del Valle
9	FW	Herlin Lino	6 February 1997 (aged 20)	(Ecuadorian Football Federation) Deportivo Cuenca
10	MF	**Bryan Cabezas**	20 March 1997 (aged 20)	(Italian Football Federation) Atalanta
11	MF	Yeison Guerrero	21 April 1998 (aged 19)	(Ecuadorian Football Federation) Independiente del Valle
12	GK	Giancarlos Terreros	14 May 1998 (aged 19)	(Ecuadorian Football Federation) Barcelona
13	DF	Jhonnatan Bravo	8 July 1997 (aged 19)	(Ecuadorian Football Federation) River Plate Ecuador
14	MF	Renny Jaramillo	12 June 1998 (aged 18)	(Ecuadorian Football Federation) Independiente del Valle
15	MF	**Jordan Sierra**	23 April 1997 (aged 20)	(Ecuadorian Football Federation) Delfín
16	MF	**Jhonny Quiñónez**	11 June 1998 (aged 18)	(Ecuadorian Football Federation) Norte América
17	MF	**Joao Rojas**	16 August 1997 (aged 19)	(Ecuadorian Football Federation) Emelec
18	DF	**Félix Torres**	11 January 1997 (aged 20)	(Ecuadorian Football Federation) Barcelona
19	FW	**Jordy Caicedo**	18 November 1997 (aged 19)	(Ecuadorian Football Federation) Universidad Católica
20	DF	**Luis Segovia**	26 October 1997 (aged 19)	(Ecuadorian Football Federation) El Nacional
21	GK	Omar Carabalí	12 June 1997 (aged 19)	(Football Federation of Chile) Colo-Colo

=== United States ===
On 17 May, Auston Trusty replaced the injured Marlon Fossey.

Head Coach: (United States) Tab Ramos

No.	Pos.	Player	Date of birth (age)	Club
1	GK	Jonathan Klinsmann	8 April 1997 (aged 20)	(United States Soccer Federation) California Golden Bears
2	DF	**Auston Trusty**	12 August 1998 (aged 18)	(United States Soccer Federation) Philadelphia Union
3	DF	**Danilo Acosta**	7 November 1997 (aged 19)	(United States Soccer Federation) Real Salt Lake
4	DF	Tommy Redding	24 January 1997 (aged 20)	(United States Soccer Federation) Orlando City
5	DF	**Erik Palmer-Brown**	24 April 1997 (aged 20)	(United States Soccer Federation) Sporting Kansas City
6	DF	Justen Glad	28 February 1997 (aged 20)	(United States Soccer Federation) Real Salt Lake
7	MF	**Eryk Williamson**	11 June 1997 (aged 19)	(United States Soccer Federation) Maryland Terrapins
8	MF	**Tyler Adams**	14 February 1999 (aged 18)	(United States Soccer Federation) New York Red Bulls
9	FW	**Emmanuel Sabbi**	24 December 1997 (aged 19)	(Royal Spanish Football Federation) Las Palmas
10	MF	Gedion Zelalem	26 January 1997 (aged 20)	(The Football Association) Arsenal
11	FW	Sebastian Saucedo	22 January 1997 (aged 20)	(United States Soccer Federation) Real Salt Lake
12	GK	JT Marcinkowski	9 May 1997 (aged 20)	(United States Soccer Federation) Georgetown Hoyas
13	FW	Lagos Kunga	20 October 1998 (aged 18)	(United States Soccer Federation) Atlanta United Academy
14	DF	**Aaron Herrera**	6 June 1997 (aged 19)	(United States Soccer Federation) New Mexico Lobos
15	FW	**Jeremy Ebobisse**	14 February 1997 (aged 20)	(United States Soccer Federation) Portland Timbers
16	DF	**Cameron Carter-Vickers**	31 December 1997 (aged 19)	(The Football Association) Tottenham Hotspur
17	FW	**Brooks Lennon**	22 September 1997 (aged 19)	(United States Soccer Federation) Real Salt Lake
18	MF	Derrick Jones	3 March 1997 (aged 20)	(United States Soccer Federation) Philadelphia Union
19	FW	**Josh Sargent**	20 February 2000 (aged 17)	(United States Soccer Federation) Scott Gallagher Missouri
20	MF	**Luca de la Torre**	23 May 1998 (aged 18)	(The Football Association) Fulham
21	GK	Brady Scott	30 June 1999 (aged 17)	(United States Soccer Federation) De Anza Force

=== Saudi Arabia ===
Head Coach: (Saudi Arabia) Saad Al-Shehri

No.	Pos.	Player	Date of birth (age)	Club
1	GK	Amin Bukhari	2 May 1997 (aged 20)	(Saudi Arabian Football Federation) Al-Ittihad
2	DF	Anas Zabani	7 April 1997 (aged 20)	(Saudi Arabian Football Federation) Al-Hilal
3	DF	Mohammed Bassas	31 August 1998 (aged 18)	(Saudi Arabian Football Federation) Al-Ahli
4	DF	**Awn Al-Saluli**	2 September 1998 (aged 18)	(Saudi Arabian Football Federation) Al-Ittihad
5	DF	**Abdulelah Al-Amri**	15 January 1997 (aged 20)	(Saudi Arabian Football Federation) Al-Nassr
6	MF	**Sami Al-Najei**	7 February 1997 (aged 20)	(Saudi Arabian Football Federation) Al-Nassr
7	MF	**Khaled Al-Sumairi**	1 January 1997 (aged 20)	(Saudi Arabian Football Federation) Al-Ittihad
8	MF	Yousef Al-Harbi	16 March 1997 (aged 20)	(Saudi Arabian Football Federation) Al-Ahli
9	MF	Hassan Al-Qeed	13 April 1998 (aged 19)	(Saudi Arabian Football Federation) Al-Shabab
10	MF	**Ayman Al-Khulaif**	22 May 1997 (aged 19)	(Saudi Arabian Football Federation) Al-Ahli
11	FW	**Abdulrahman Al-Yami**	19 June 1997 (aged 19)	(Saudi Arabian Football Federation) Al-Hilal
12	GK	Saleh Al Ohaymid	21 May 1998 (aged 18)	(Saudi Arabian Football Federation) Al-Nassr
13	DF	**Hassan Tambakti**	9 February 1999 (aged 18)	(Saudi Arabian Football Federation) Al-Shabab
14	MF	**Ali Al-Asmari**	12 January 1997 (aged 20)	(Saudi Arabian Football Federation) Al-Ahli
15	MF	Naif Kariri	16 April 1998 (aged 19)	(Saudi Arabian Football Federation) Al-Hilal
16	MF	**Abdurahman Al-Dossari**	25 September 1997 (aged 19)	(Saudi Arabian Football Federation) Al-Nassr
17	DF	**Abdullah Hassoun**	19 March 1997 (aged 20)	(Saudi Arabian Football Federation) Al-Ahli
18	MF	**Nasser Al-Dawsari**	19 December 1998 (aged 18)	(Saudi Arabian Football Federation) Al-Hilal
19	MF	**Fahad Al-Rashidi**	16 May 1997 (aged 20)	(Saudi Arabian Football Federation) Al-Hilal
20	FW	Mansour Al-Muwallad	24 January 1997 (aged 20)	(Saudi Arabian Football Federation) Al-Ahli
21	GK	**Mohammed Al Rubaie**	14 August 1997 (aged 19)	(Saudi Arabian Football Federation) Al-Ahli

=== Senegal ===
Head Coach: (Senegal) Joseph Koto

No.	Pos.	Player	Date of birth (age)	Club
1	GK	Mouhamed Mbaye	13 October 1997 (aged 19)	(Portuguese Football Federation) Porto
2	DF	Waly Diouf	5 May 1997 (aged 20)	(French Football Federation) Valenciennes
3	DF	Jean N'Decky	10 January 1997 (aged 20)	(Senegalese Football Federation) Casa Sports
4	DF	Souleymane Aw	5 April 1999 (aged 18)	(Senegalese Football Federation) Excellence Foot de Dakar
5	MF	Ousseynou Diagne	5 June 1999 (aged 17)	(Senegalese Football Federation) Académie Foot Darou Salam
6	DF	Mamadou Diarra	20 December 1997 (aged 19)	(Turkish Football Federation) Boluspor
7	FW	Ibrahima Niane	11 March 1999 (aged 18)	(Senegalese Football Federation) Génération Foot
8	DF	Moussa Ba	1 January 1998 (aged 19)	(Senegalese Football Federation) Excellence Foot de Dakar
9	FW	Mouhamed Pouye	26 December 1997 (aged 19)	(Senegalese Football Federation) Mbour Petite-Côte
10	FW	Aliou Badji	10 October 1997 (aged 19)	(Swedish Football Association) Djurgårdens IF
11	FW	Ibrahima N'Diaye	6 June 1998 (aged 18)	(Egyptian Football Association) Wadi Degla
12	FW	Habib Guèye	20 September 1999 (aged 17)	(Senegalese Football Federation) Académie Foot Darou Salam
13	DF	Alioune Guèye	20 August 1998 (aged 18)	(Senegalese Football Federation) ASC Niarry Tally
14	FW	Ousseynou Niang	12 October 2001 (aged 15)	(Senegalese Football Federation) Diambars
15	DF	**Moussa Wagué**	4 October 1998 (aged 18)	(Royal Belgian Football Association) Eupen
16	GK	Lamine Sarr	18 June 1998 (aged 18)	(Senegalese Football Federation) AS Dakar Sacré-Cœur
17	MF	**Krépin Diatta**	25 February 1999 (aged 18)	(Norwegian Football Federation) Sarpsborg
18	MF	Soulèye Sarr	29 June 1997 (aged 19)	(Senegalese Football Federation) Mbour Petite-Côte
19	MF	Bamba Kane	4 January 1997 (aged 20)	(Senegalese Football Federation) Diambars
20	DF	Mamadou M'Baye	28 June 1998 (aged 18)	(Senegalese Football Federation) AS Dakar Sacré-Cœur
21	GK	Idrissa N'Diaye	14 March 1998 (aged 19)	(Senegalese Football Federation) Diambars
