= Rafael Sánchez =

Rafael Sánchez may refer to:

- Rafael Sánchez Cabrales (born 1963), Mexican politician from Tabasco
- Rafael Sánchez Ferlosio, Spanish writer
- Rafael Sánchez (footballer) (born 1998), Venezuelan footballer
- Rafael Sánchez-Guerra, president of Real Madrid football club from 1935 to 1939
- Rafael Sánchez Mazas, founder and leader of Falange, a former Spanish political party
- Rafael Sánchez Navarro, Spanish-Mexican actor
- Rafael Sánchez Pérez (1944–2008), Mexican politician from Jalisco
- Rafael Sánchez (wrestler), Dominican wrestler
- Luis Rafael Sánchez, Puerto Rican playwright
- Rafael Molina Sánchez, Spanish bullfighter
