= Same-sex marriage in Jalisco =

Same-sex marriage has been legal in Jalisco since a unanimous ruling by the Mexican Supreme Court on 26 January 2016 striking down the state's same-sex marriage ban as unconstitutional under Articles 1 and 4 of the Constitution of Mexico. The ruling was published in the Official Journal of the Federation on 21 April; however, some municipalities refused to marry same-sex couples until being ordered by Congress to do so on 12 May 2016. The state Congress passed a bill codifiying same-sex marriage into law on 6 April 2022.

Previously, Jalisco had recognized civil unions offering several of the rights and benefits of marriage. Civil union legislation passed Congress in October 2013 and took effect on 1 January 2014, but was struck down on procedural grounds by the Supreme Court in September 2018.

== Civil unions ==
In April 2013, deputies from the Party of the Democratic Revolution (PRD), the Institutional Revolutionary Party (PRI), the Ecologist Green Party of Mexico (PVEM), Citizens' Movement (MC) and an independent deputy presented the Free Coexistence Act (Spanish: Ley de Libre Convivencia) to Congress. The legislation guaranteed several legal rights, benefits and obligations to same-sex couples in the form of civil unions. It did not legalize adoption and mandated that civil unions be performed with a civil law notary. On 31 October 2013, the Congress of Jalisco approved the bill in a 20–15 vote, with one abstention and three absences. The law took effect on 1 January 2014.

Political party	Members	Yes	No	Abstain	Absent
Institutional Revolutionary Party	17	15	1		1
National Action Party	13		11		2
Party of the Democratic Revolution	2	2			
Ecologist Green Party of Mexico	1	1			
Citizens' Movement	5	1	3	1	
Independent	1	1			
Total	39	20	15	1	3

On 13 September 2018, the Supreme Court of Justice of the Nation struck down the law on procedural grounds.

== Same-sex marriage ==
=== Background ===
After having filed an amparo in court, Zaira Viridiana de la O Gómez and Martha Sandoval became the first same-sex couple to marry in Jalisco on 14 December 2013. In December 2013, 12 couples of the same sex—eight women and four men—filed an amparo after their applications for marriage licenses were rejected by civil registry officials. The amparo was granted on 12 June 2014.

In January 2014, a male couple sought a marriage license at the civil registry in Guadalajara, but were rejected based on articles 258, 260 and 267bis of the state's Civil Code. They filed an amparo in the Fourth District Court. On 8 January 2015, because Guadalajara municipal officials had challenged the amparo, the case was elevated to the Supreme Court of Justice of the Nation (SCJN). The couple was granted the amparo, but still contested the constitutionality of the three articles. Article 258 of the Civil Code described marriage as "an institution of public character and social interest, through which a man and a woman decide to share a state of life in search of personal fulfillment and the foundation of a family". Article 260 stated that "the man and the woman" had to be at least sixteen years old, and article 267bis required "the man and the woman" to have completed premarital counseling. On 26 November 2015, the First Chamber of the Mexican Supreme Court declared the three articles unconstitutional. On 24 March 2014, ten same-sex couples applied for marriage licenses at the civil registry office in Guadalajara. They were turned down, and filed an amparo with the help of CLADEM.

In June 2014, Deputy Héctor Pizano Ramos from the Institutional Revolutionary Party introduced legislation to Congress to legalize same-sex marriage. After a national ruling from the SCJN labeling all bans on same-sex marriage unconstitutional on 12 June 2015, state deputies announced on 17 June that they would renew their efforts to amend the Civil Code after the ruling's official publication in the judicial gazette.

=== Action of unconstitutionality (2015–2016) ===
On 4 May 2015, the National Human Rights Commission filed an action of unconstitutionality (acción de inconstitucionalidad; docketed 28/2015) against the state of Jalisco, contesting the constitutionality of articles 258, 260 and 267bis. The Congress of Jalisco had recently amended state family law but while doing so did not repeal the state's ban on same-sex marriage. The Commission took this opportunity to file the action of unconstitutionality.

On 26 January 2016, the Mexican Supreme Court ruled unanimously that the three articles were unconstitutional, determining that Jalisco's same-sex marriage ban violated Articles 1 and 4 of the Constitution of Mexico. Article 1 of the Constitution states that "any form of discrimination, based on ethnic or national origin, gender, age, disabilities, social status, medical conditions, religion, opinions, sexual orientation, marital status, or any other form, which violates the human dignity or seeks to annul or diminish the rights and freedoms of the people, is prohibited.", and Article 4 relates to matrimonial equality, stating that "man and woman are equal under the law. The law shall protect the organization and development of the family." (Note: The English translation of the Constitution of Mexico holds no legal weight. In Spanish, the text of Article 4 reads: El varón y la mujer son iguales ante la ley. Esta protegerá la organización y el desarrollo de la familia. In the indigenous Huichol language, co-official in parts of Jalisco, it reads: 'Ukitsi metá 'ukari yaxeikía mekani'aneneni lei hepaitsita. Kiekatari ke miteukutei metá ke memiteuyukuhana waheimá kaninuaka 'iki lei.) The three articles were struck down upon the ruling's publication in the judicial gazette and a new gender-neutral text from the court overrode the existing text upon publication in Jalisco's state gazette and the federal gazette. Following all three publications, civil registries in the state were ordered to marry all couples. Prior to the publication date, the mayors of Guadalajara, Tlaquepaque and Zapopan had ordered the civil registries in their jurisdictions to start marrying same-sex couples. On 21 April 2016, the Supreme Court ruling was printed in the Official Journal of the Federation (Diario Oficial de la Federación), and on 23 April the ruling was published in Jalisco's state gazette.

In March 2016, the civil registry of Puerto Vallarta told the media that the Jalisco State Civil Registry Directory had changed all marriage license forms to gender-neutral on 22 March and that couples could already begin receiving them. Mayor Arturo Dávalos Peña officiated the weddings of two same-sex couples on 20 April 2016, which were the first same-sex marriages recorded in the resort city. On 12 May 2016, the Congress of Jalisco instructed all of the state's municipalities to enforce the Supreme Court ruling and perform same-sex marriages. According to a local LGBT group, four municipalities were known to have refused to marry at least one same-sex couple following the Supreme Court ruling: La Barca, Ocotlán, Santa María de los Ángeles and Tepatitlán. The Supreme Court ruling also struck down the state's adoption ban. By May 2016, the municipality of Guadalajara had received five applications of adoption by same-sex couples.

=== Passage of legislation in Congress (2022) ===
On 29 June 2017, Deputy Claudia Delgadillo González introduced a bill to Congress to reflect the Supreme Court ruling by modifying articles 258, 260 and 267bis of the Civil Code and inserting a gender-neutral definition of marriage. A similar bill to codify the Supreme Court ruling into law was passed by the state Congress on 6 April 2022 by a vote of 26–8 with 3 abstentions. The vote was secret without the public being able to have knowledge of the votes cast by each representative. The secret vote was requested by Deputy Susana de La Rosa Hernández, who had introduced the legislation to Congress, who feared that deputies voting in favor would be harassed and receive threats from conservative Catholic groups protesting outside the Congress building. The National Regeneration Movement and the local left-wing Hagamos party made it known that their deputies had voted in favor of the reform. Governor Enrique Alfaro Ramírez welcomed the vote. The law was published in the official state journal on 9 April 2022, and took effect the following day.

Article 258 of the Civil Code was amended to read:

- in Spanish: El matrimonio es una institución de carácter público e interés social, por medio de la cual dos personas deciden de manera libre para realizar la comunidad de vida, para la búsqueda de su realización personal y la fundación de una familia con respeto, ayuda mutua e igualdad de derechos y obligaciones.
- (Marriage is a public and social institution, through which two people decide freely to carry out a community of life, in search of personal fulfillment and the foundation of a family with respect, mutual aid and equal rights and obligations.)

=== Statistics ===
The following table shows the number of same-sex marriages performed in Jalisco since legalization in 2016 as reported by the National Institute of Statistics and Geography.

Number of marriages performed in Jalisco
Year	Same-sex			Opposite-sex	Total	% same-sex
Year	Female	Male	Total	Opposite-sex	Total	% same-sex
2016	196	120	316	37,600	37,916	0.83%
2017	265	196	461	37,295	37,756	1.22%
2018	293	215	508	35,053	35,561	1.43%
2019	360	233	593	35,230	35,823	1.66%
2020	273	220	493	25,206	25,699	1.92%
2021	418	321	739	33,788	34,527	2.14%

== Public opinion ==
A 2017 opinion poll conducted by Gabinete de Comunicación Estratégica found that 42% of Jalisco residents supported same-sex marriage, while 54% were opposed.

According to a 2018 survey by the National Institute of Statistics and Geography, 34% of the Jalisco public opposed same-sex marriage, the sixth lowest in Mexico after Mexico City (29%), Baja California (31%), Sonora (31%), Querétaro (32%), and México (34%).

== See also ==
- LGBT rights in Mexico
- Same-sex marriage in Mexico
- Recognition of same-sex unions in the Americas
