= 1st federal electoral district of Tabasco =

Federal electoral district of Mexico

Tabasco's 1st
- Electoral district of the Chamber of Deputies of Mexico

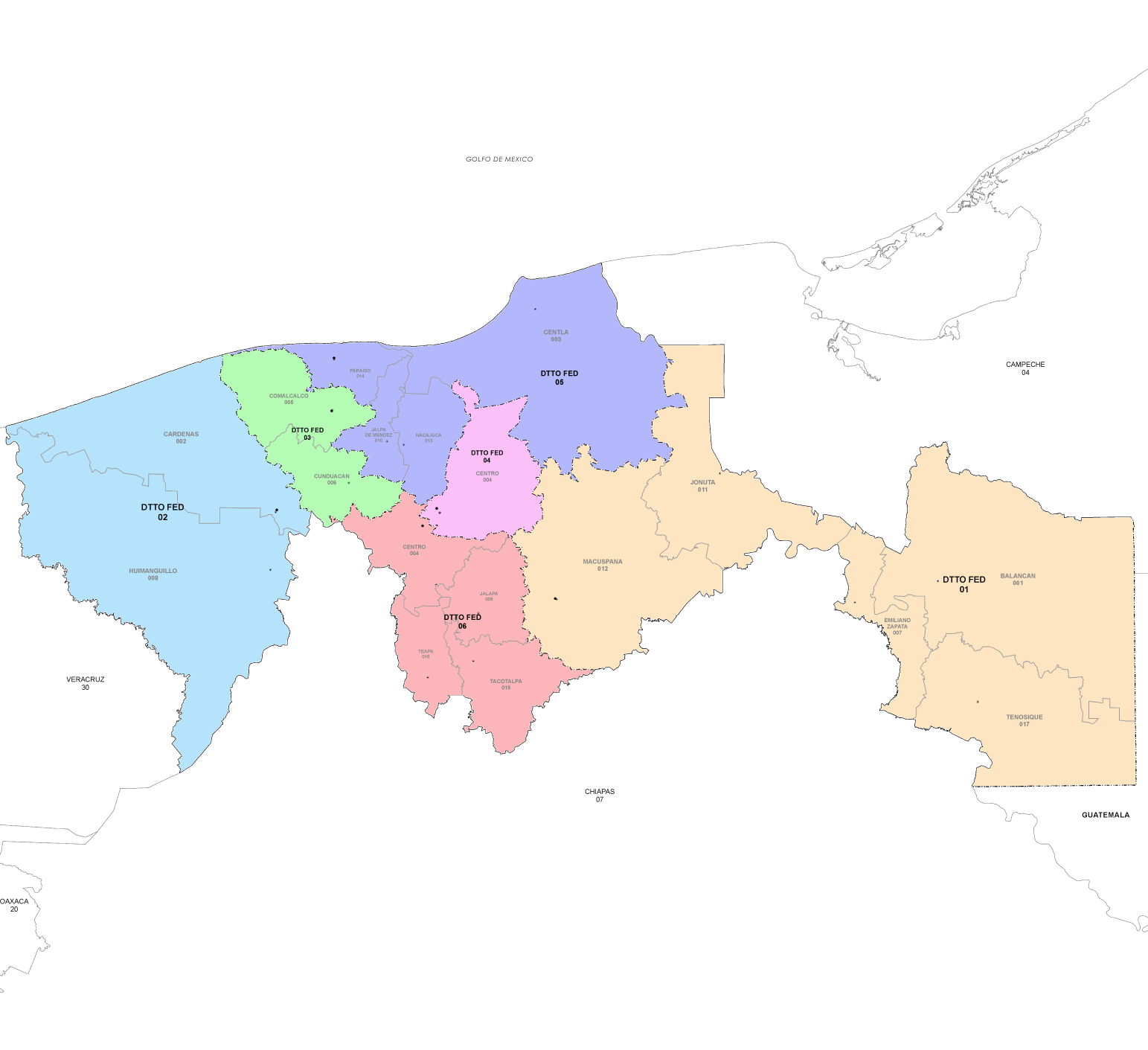
- 1st district

Incumbent
- Member: Julio Gutiérrez Bocanegra
- Party: ▌Morena
- Congress: 66th (2024–2027)

District
- State: Tabasco
- Head town: Macuspana
- Coordinates: 17°46′N 92°36′W
- Covers: Balancán, Emiliano Zapata, Jonuta, Macuspana, Tenosique
- PR region: Third
- Precincts: 213
- Population: 342,346 (2020 census)

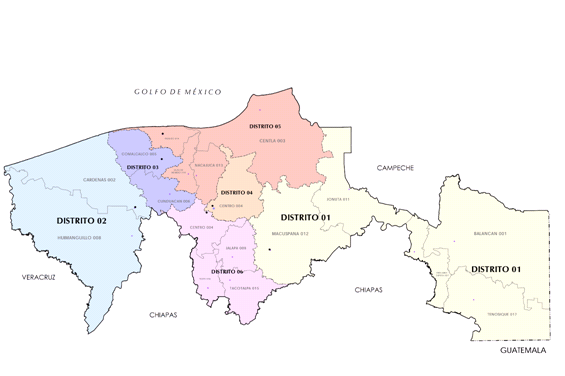
Tabasco's districts in 2017–2022

The 1st federal electoral district of Tabasco (Spanish: Distrito electoral federal 01 de Tabasco) is one of the 300 electoral districts into which Mexico is divided for elections to the federal Chamber of Deputies and one of six such districts in the state of Tabasco.

It elects one deputy to the lower house of Congress for each three-year legislative session by means of the first-past-the-post system. Votes cast in the district also count towards the calculation of proportional representation ("plurinominal") deputies elected from the third region.

The current member for the district, elected in the 2024 general election, is Julio Ernesto Gutiérrez Bocanegra of the National Regeneration Movement (Morena).

== District territory ==
Under the 2023 districting plan adopted by the National Electoral Institute (INE), which is to be used for the 2024, 2027 and 2030 federal elections, Tabasco's 1st district covers the eastern portion of the state and comprises 213 electoral precincts (secciones electorales) across five of the state's municipalities:

- Balancán, Emiliano Zapata, Jonuta, Macuspana and Tenosique.

The head town (cabecera distrital), where results from individual polling stations are gathered together and tallied, is the city of Macuspana. The district reported a population of 342,346 in the 2020 census.

== Previous districting schemes ==
Evolution of electoral district numbers
	1974	1978	1996	2005	2017	2023
Tabasco	3	5	6	6	6	6
Chamber of Deputies	196	300				

2017–2022

From 2017 to 2022, the district's head town was at Macuspana and it covered the same five municipalities as in the 2023 plan.

2005–2017

Under the 2005 plan, the district had the same configuration as in the 2017 and 2023 schemes.

1996–2005

Tabasco gained its 6th district in the 1996 redistricting process. The 1st covered the north, north-east and east of the state, comprising the municipalities of Paraíso, Centla, Jonuta, Emiliano Zapata, Balancán and Tenosique. Its head town was at Frontera.

1978–1996

The districting scheme in force from 1978 to 1996 was the result of the 1977 electoral reforms, which increased the number of single-member seats in the Chamber of Deputies from 196 to 300. Under that plan, Tabasco's seat allocation rose from three to five. The 1st district comprised the municipality of Centro, including the state capital, Villahermosa.

== Deputies returned to Congress ==
(Mexico) National parties
- Current
- PAN
- PRI
- PT
- PVEM
- MC
- Morena
- PAZ
- Somos
- Defunct or local only
- PLM
- PNR
- PRM
- PNM
- PP
- PPS
- PARM
- PFCRN
- CON
- PANAL
- PSD
- PES
- PES
- PRD

Tabasco's 1st district
Election	Deputy	Party	Term	Legislature
1916	Rafael Martínez de Escobar		1916–1917	Constituent Congress of Querétaro
...
1964	Manuel Gurría Ordóñez	Institutional Revolutionary Party	1964–1967	46th Congress
1967	Mario Trujillo García	Institutional Revolutionary Party	1967–1970	47th Congress
1970	Manuel Piñera Morales	Institutional Revolutionary Party	1970–1973	48th Congress
1973	Feliciano Calzada Padrón	Institutional Revolutionary Party	1973–1976	49th Congress
1976	Luis Priego Ortiz	Institutional Revolutionary Party	1976–1979	50th Congress
1979	Ángel Augusto Buendía Tirado	Institutional Revolutionary Party	1979–1982	51st Congress
1982	Amador Izundegui Rullán	Institutional Revolutionary Party	1982–1985	52nd Congress
1985	Nicolás Reynés Berezaluce	Institutional Revolutionary Party	1985–1988	53rd Congress
1988	Gustavo Rosario Torres	Institutional Revolutionary Party	1988–1991	54th Congress
1991	Roberto Madrazo Pintado	Institutional Revolutionary Party	1991–1994	55th Congress
1994	César Raúl Ojeda Zubieta	Institutional Revolutionary Party	1994–1997	56th Congress
1997	José Agapito Domínguez Lacroix	Institutional Revolutionary Party	1997–2000	57th Congress
2000	Julio César Vidal Pérez	Institutional Revolutionary Party	2000–2003	58th Congress
2003	Francisco Herrera León	Institutional Revolutionary Party	2003–2006	59th Congress
2006	Rafael Elías Sánchez Cabrales	Party of the Democratic Revolution	2006–2009	60th Congress
2009	José Antonio Aysa Bernat	Institutional Revolutionary Party	2009–2012	61st Congress
2012	Claudia Elizabeth Bojórquez Javier	Party of the Democratic Revolution	2012–2015	62nd Congress
2015	Elio Bocanegra Ruiz	Party of the Democratic Revolution	2015–2018	63rd Congress
2018	Estela Núñez Álvarez	National Regeneration Movement	2018–2021	64th Congress
2021	Marcos Rosendo Medina Filigrana	National Regeneration Movement	2021–2024	65th Congress
2024	Julio Ernesto Gutiérrez Bocanegra	National Regeneration Movement	2024–2027	66th Congress

=== Results ===
The corresponding page on the Spanish-language Wikipedia contains results of the congressional elections since 1991.

== Presidential elections ==
Tabasco's 1st district
Election	District won by	Party or coalition	%
2018	Andrés Manuel López Obrador	Juntos Haremos Historia	78.6010
2024	Claudia Sheinbaum Pardo	Sigamos Haciendo Historia	82.0739
