= 11th federal electoral district of Jalisco =

Federal electoral district of Mexico

Jalisco's 11th
- Electoral district of the Chamber of Deputies of Mexico

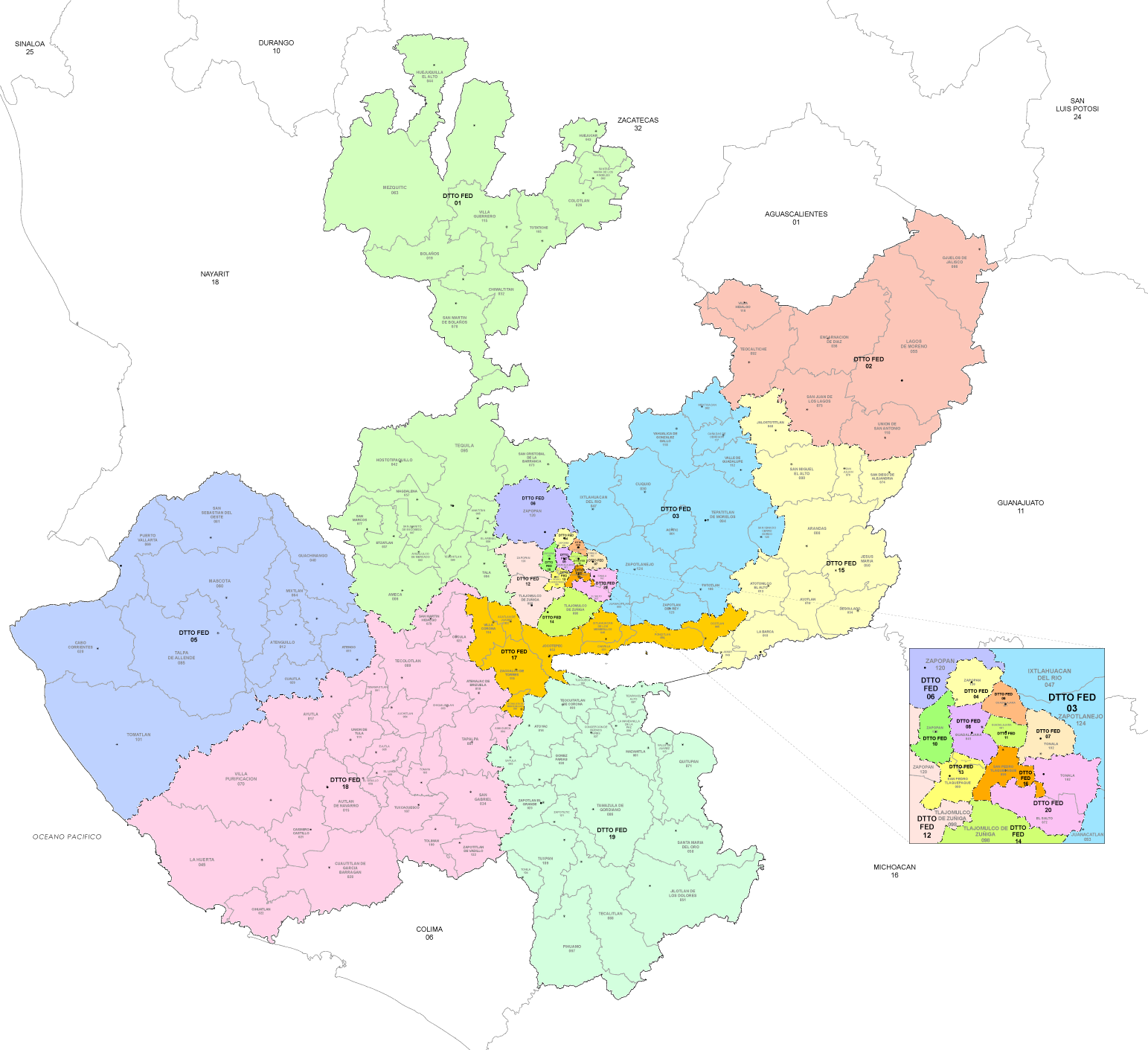
- 11th district

Incumbent
- Member: Merilyn Gómez Pozos
- Party: ▌Morena
- Congress: 66th (2024–2027)

District
- State: Jalisco
- Head town: Guadalajara
- Coordinates: 20°40′N 103°21′W
- Covers: Municipality of Guadalajara (part)
- PR region: First
- Precincts: 311
- Population: 412,918 (2020 census)

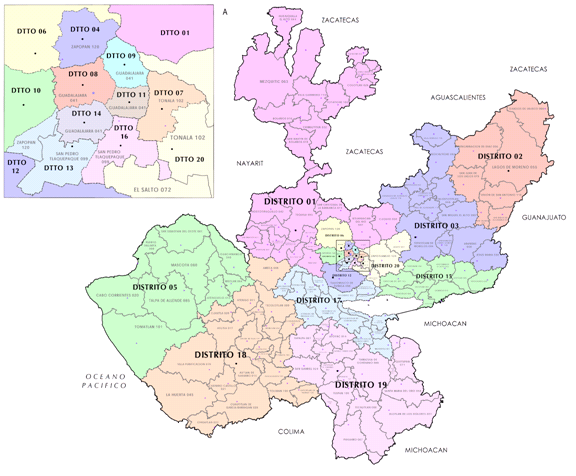
Jalisco's districts in 2017–2022

The 11th federal electoral district of Jalisco (Spanish: Distrito electoral federal 11 de Jalisco) is one of the 300 electoral districts into which Mexico is divided for elections to the federal Chamber of Deputies and one of 20 such districts in the state of Jalisco.

It elects one deputy to the lower house of Congress for each three-year legislative session by means of the first-past-the-post system. Votes cast in the district also count towards the calculation of proportional representation ("plurinominal") deputies elected from the first region.

The current member for the district, elected in the 2024 general election, is Merilyn Gómez Pozos of the National Regeneration Movement (Morena).

== District territory ==
Under the 2023 districting plan adopted by the National Electoral Institute (INE), which is to be used for the 2024, 2027 and 2030 federal elections, Jalisco's 11th district covers 311 electoral precincts (secciones electorales) in the south-eastern portion of the municipality of Guadalajara. (Note: The 8th, 9th and 13th districts cover the remainder of the municipality.)

The head town (cabecera distrital), where results from individual polling stations are gathered together and tallied, is the state capital, the city of Guadalajara. The district reported a population of 412,918 in the 2020 census.

== Previous districting schemes ==
Evolution of electoral district numbers
	1974	1978	1996	2005	2017	2023
Jalisco	13	20	19	19	20	20
Chamber of Deputies	196	300				

2017–2022

Jalisco regained its 20th congressional seat in the 2017 redistricting process. The 11th district's head town was at Guadalajara and it covered 230 precincts in the south-east of the municipality.

2005–2017

Under the 2005 plan, Jalisco had 19 districts. This district's head town was at Guadalajara and it covered 174 precincts in the east of the municipality.

1996–2005

In the 1996 scheme, under which Jalisco lost a single-member seat, the district had its head town at Guadalajara and it comprised 155 precincts in the east of the municipality.

1978–1996

The districting scheme in force from 1978 to 1996 was the result of the 1977 electoral reforms, which increased the number of single-member seats in the Chamber of Deputies from 196 to 300. Under that plan, Jalisco's seat allocation rose from 13 to 20. The 11th district's head town was at Autlán de Navarro and it covered 13 municipalities in the south-west of the state:
- Atenguillo, Ayutla, Cabo Corrientes, Casimiro Castillo, Cihuatlán, Cuautitlán, Cuautla, La Huerta, Mixtlán, Purificación, Talpa de Allende, Tomatlán and Autlán de Navarro.

== Deputies returned to Congress ==
(Mexico) National parties
- Current
- PAN
- PRI
- PT
- PVEM
- MC
- Morena
- PAZ
- Somos
- Defunct or local only
- PLM
- PNR
- PRM
- PNM
- PP
- PPS
- PARM
- PFCRN
- CON
- PANAL
- PSD
- PES
- PES
- PRD

Jalisco's 11th district
Election	Deputy	Party	Term	Legislature
1916	Amado Aguirre Santiago		1916–1917	Constituent Congress of Querétaro
...
1964	María Guadalupe Urzúa Flores	Institutional Revolutionary Party	1964–1967	46th Congress
1967	Sebastián García Barragán	Institutional Revolutionary Party	1967–1970	47th Congress
1970	María Guadalupe Urzúa Flores	Institutional Revolutionary Party	1970–1973	48th Congress
1973	José Luis Lamadrid Sauza	Institutional Revolutionary Party	1973–1976	49th Congress
1976	Héctor Francisco Castañeda Jiménez	Institutional Revolutionary Party	1976–1979	50th Congress
1979	Ismael Orozco Loreto	Institutional Revolutionary Party	1979–1982	51st Congress
1982	Víctor Manuel Torres Ramírez	Institutional Revolutionary Party	1982–1985	52nd Congress
1985	Javier Michel Díaz	Institutional Revolutionary Party	1985–1988	53rd Congress
1988	Ismael Orozco Loreto	Institutional Revolutionary Party	1988–1991	54th Congress
1991	Bertha Onésima González Rubio	Institutional Revolutionary Party	1991–1994	55th Congress
1994	Ismael Orozco Loreto	Institutional Revolutionary Party	1994–1997	56th Congress
1997	Rafael Sánchez Pérez	National Action Party (Mexico)	1997–2000	57th Congress
2000	Julio César Lizárraga López	National Action Party (Mexico)	2000–2003	58th Congress
2003	Claudia Delgadillo González	Institutional Revolutionary Party	2003–2006	59th Congress
2006	Alonso Manuel Lizaola de la Torre	National Action Party (Mexico)	2006–2009	60th Congress
2009	Salvador Caro Cabrera	Labour Party (Mexico)	2009–2012	61st Congress
2012	Claudia Delgadillo González	Institutional Revolutionary Party	2012–2015	62nd Congress
2015	Jonadab Martínez García	Citizens' Movement (Mexico)	2015–2018	63rd Congress
2018	Kehila Abigail Ku Escalante (Note: Ku Escalante resigned her seat on 5 March 2021 and was replaced for the remainder of her term by her alternate, Sánchez Manzo.); Irma Sánchez Manzo	Citizens' Movement (Mexico)	2018–2021; 2021	64th Congress
2021	Claudia Delgadillo González	Ecologist Green Party of Mexico	2021–2024	65th Congress
2024	Merilyn Gómez Pozos	National Regeneration Movement	2024–2027	66th Congress

== Presidential elections ==
Jalisco's 11th district
Election	District won by	Party or coalition	%
2018	Andrés Manuel López Obrador	Juntos Haremos Historia	45.8583
2024	Claudia Sheinbaum Pardo	Sigamos Haciendo Historia	45.5482
