= Francisco León =

Francisco León may refer to:

- Francisco León, Chiapas, a town and municipality of Chiapas, Mexico
- Francisco León (Mister Venezuela) (born 1981), Venezuelan model and singer
- Francisco Giovanni León (born 1992), Mexican footballer
- Francisco Herrera León (born 1966), Mexican politician
- Francisco León Franco (1832–1880), Vice President of Ecuador
- Francisco León Mane (born 1973), Spanish cyclist
