= Kehila Ku Escalante =

Mexican politician from Guadalajara, Jalisco

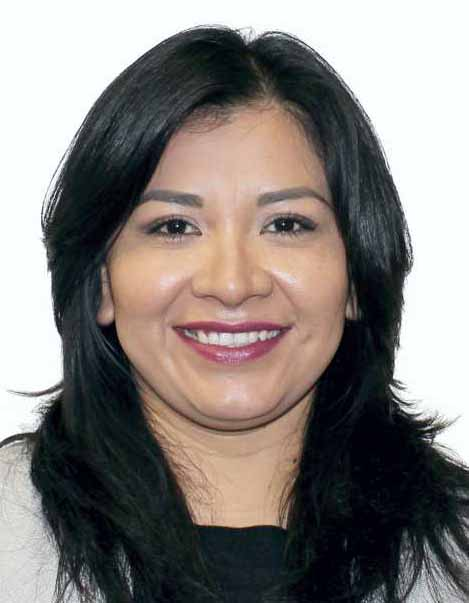

Deputy of the Congress of the Union
- In office August 29, 2018 – August 31, 2021

Deputy of the Congress of Jalisco
- In office 2015–2018

Personal details
- Born: Kehila Abigail Ku Escalante; 2 September 1985 (age 40)
- Party: Citizens' Movement
- Education: University of Guadalajara
- Occupation: Politician

Kehila Abigail Ku Escalante (born September 2, 1985) is a Mexican politician. A member of the Citizens' Movement party, she is currently a member of the City Council of Guadalajara. She served as a member of the Chamber of Deputies from 2018 to 2021, representing Jalisco's 11th district in the 64th Congress. Prior to this, she was a member of the Congress of Jalisco from 2015 to 2018.

== Early life and education ==
She attended the Sämann University of Jalisco, receiving a bachelor's degree in 2008. In 2014, she received a master's degree in public policies from the University of Guadalajara.

== Political career ==
From 2015 to 2018, she was a member of the Congress of Jalisco. She served on the Culture Commission in the state congress.

In the 2018 general election, she was elected to represent Jalisco's 11th district in the Chamber of Deputies during the 64th Congress. As a federal deputy, she voted in favor of an effort to legalize abortion in Mexico. In 2020, she urged prosecutors to scrutinize businessman Carlos Servín Martínez, who approached her to request political favoritism. She resigned her seat on 5 March 2021 and was replaced for the remainder of her term by her alternate, Irma Sánchez Manzo.

In 2021, she was elected to serve on the City Council of Guadalajara.
