= Merilyn Gómez Pozos =

Mexican politician and lawyer

Merilyn "Mery" Gómez Pozos
- Born: 11 December 1981 (age 44); Guadalajara, Jalisco, Mexico
- Occupations: Politician and lawyer
- Political party: Convergence, MORENA

Merilyn Gómez Pozos (born 11 December 1981) is a Mexican politician and lawyer. At different times she has been affiliated with both Convergence and the National Regeneration Movement (Morena).

She has been elected to the Chamber of Deputies on two occasions: in the 2012 general election, for Convergence, as a plurinominal deputy for the first region, and in the 2024 general election, on the Morena ticket, for Jalisco's 11th district.
