= Irma Sánchez =

Mexican boxer (born 1987)

Personal information
- Nickname: La Güerita
- Born: Irma Sánchez Manzo; 6 December 1987 (age 38) Guadalajara, Jalisco, Mexico
- Height: 5 ft 2 in (157 cm)
- Weight: Light flyweight; Flyweight; Super flyweight

Boxing career
- Reach: 65 in (165 cm)
- Stance: Orthodox

Boxing record
- Total fights: 39
- Wins: 30
- Win by KO: 8
- Losses: 8
- Draws: 1

Irma Sánchez (born 6 December 1987) is a Mexican professional boxer. She held the IBF female light flyweight title in 2011, the WBA interim female flyweight title in 2017 and challenged once for the WBC light flyweight title in 2010.

== Professional career ==
Sánchez made her professional debut on 19 August 2006, scoring a fourth-round knockout over Ines Gonzalez in a scheduled four-round bout.

== Political career ==
In 2021, she sat in the Chamber of Deputies during the final months of the 64th session of Congress representing Jalisco's 11th congressional district as the alternate of Kehila Ku Escalante of the Citizens' Movement, who resigned her seat on 5 March 2021.

== Professional boxing record ==
39 fights	30 wins	8 losses
By knockout	8	1
By decision	22	7
Draws	1	

No.	Result	Record	Opponent	Type	Round, time	Date	Location	Notes
39	Loss	30–8–1	(Japan) Naoko Fujioka	UD	10	14 Sep 2018	Korakuen Hall, Tokyo, Japan	
38	Win	30–7–1	(Mexico) Brenda Ramos	SD	10	14 Oct 2017	Domo del Parque San Rafael, Guadalajara, Mexico	
37	Win	29–7–1	(Mexico) Maria Guadalupe Atilano Gomez	UD	6	24 Jun 2017	Domo del Parque San Rafael, Guadalajara, Mexico	
36	Loss	28–7–1	(Mexico) Jazmin Ortega	UD	10	15 Mar 2014	Estadio de Beisbol, Los Cabos, Mexico	
35	Win	28–6–1	(Mexico) Yesenia Martinez Castrejon	UD	10	7 Dec 2013	Hotel Ixtapa Azul, Zihuatanejo, Mexico	
34	Win	27–6–1	(Mexico) Katia Gutiérrez	SD	10	7 Sep 2013	Casino, Apodaca, Mexico	
33	Win	26–6–1	(Mexico) Tania Cosme	RTD	4 (10), 2:00	6 Jul 2013	Ixtapa Zihuatanejo, Mexico	
32	Loss	25–6–1	(Mexico) Yéssica Chávez	UD	10	23 Feb 2013	Centro de Convenciones, Ixtapa Zihuatanejo, Mexico	For vacant WBC Silver light-flyweight title
31	Win	25–5–1	(United States) Carina Moreno	UD	10	22 Sep 2012	Unidad Deportiva Norte, Cortázar, Mexico	Retained WBF flyweight title
30	Win	24–5–1	(United States) Sharon Gaines	UD	10	4 Aug 2012	Centro de Convenciones, Mazatlan, Mexico	Retained WBF flyweight title
29	Win	23–5–1	(Mexico) Ibeth Zamora Silva	SD	10	2 Jun 2012	Coliseo Olimpico de la UG, Guadalajara, Mexico	
28	Win	22–5–1	(Thailand) Waranya Yoohanngoh	TKO	2 (10), 1:27	14 Jan 2012	Coliseo Olimpico de la UG, Guadalajara, Mexico	Retained WBF flyweight title
27	Win	21–5–1	(Mexico) Susana Cruz Perez	UD	10	8 Oct 2011	Los Cabos, Mexico	Retained WBF flyweight title
26	Win	20–5–1	(Spain) Carlota Santos	RTD	6 (10), 2:00	23 Jul 2011	Coliseo Olimpico de la UG, Guadalajara, Mexico	Won vacant WBF flyweight title
25	Loss	19–5–1	(Mexico) Yéssica Chávez	SD	10	16 Apr 2011	World Trade Center, Boca del Río, Mexico	For IBF light-flyweight title
24	Win	19–4–1	(Mexico) Katia Gutiérrez	UD	10	22 Jan 2011	Arena Neza, Ciudad Nezahualcóyotl, Mexico	Won vacant IBF light-flyweight title
23	Loss	18–4–1	(Japan) Naomi Togashi	UD	10	2 Oct 2010	Coliseo Olimpico de la UG, Guadalajara, Mexico	For WBC light-flyweight title
22	Win	18–3–1	(Uruguay) Soledad Macedo	UD	10	10 Jul 2010	Arena VFG, Guadalajara, Mexico	Won vacant WBC Silver light-flyweight title
21	Win	17–3–1	(Thailand) Kanittha Kokietgym	UD	10	13 Feb 2010	Gimnasio Auditorio, Los Cabos, Mexico	
20	Win	16–3–1	(Mexico) Yesenia Martinez Castrejon	UD	10	7 Nov 2009	Auditorio Benito Juárez, Zapopan, Mexico	
19	Win	15–3–1	(Mexico) Susana Morales	RTD	6 (10), 2:00	16 Oct 2009	Modelo Center, La Paz, Mexico	Won vacant NABF and WBC Youth flyweight titles
18	Win	14–3–1	(Mexico) Lucia Avalos	UD	10	8 Aug 2009	Auditorio Benito Juárez, Zapopan, Mexico	
17	Loss	13–3–1	(Mexico) Mariana Juárez	UD	8	5 Jun 2009	Palenque Calle 2, Zapopan, Mexico	For interim WBC flyweight title
16	Win	13–2–1	(Mexico) Sandra Hernandez	UD	10	3 Apr 2009	Palenque Calle 2, Zapopan, Mexico	
15	Win	12–2–1	(Panama) Chantal Martínez	UD	10	6 Dec 2008	Palenque Calle 2, Zapopan, Mexico	
14	Win	11–2–1	(Mexico) Lucia Avalos	UD	10	17 Oct 2008	Auditorio Benito Juarez, Guadalajara, Mexico	Won vacant WBC International super-flyweight title
13	Draw	10–2–1	(Mexico) Susana Vazquez	TD	2 (10)	2 Aug 2008	Auditorio Benito Juárez, Zapopan, Mexico	Fight stopped after accidental headbutt
12	Win	10–2	(Mexico) Magaly Avalos	UD	10	2 May 2008	Twin Lions Casino, Guadalajara, Mexico	
11	Win	9–2	(Mexico) Sara Rendon	UD	6	4 Apr 2008	Salon El General, Guadalajara, Mexico	
10	Win	8–2	(Mexico) Isabel Lopez	UD	4	8 Feb 2008	Coliseo Olimpico de la UG, Guadalajara, Mexico	
9	Win	7–2	(Mexico) Sara Rendon	TKO	3 (6), 1:38	14 Dec 2007	Coliseo Olimpico de la UG, Guadalajara, Mexico	
8	Loss	6–2	(Mexico) Maria Elena Villalobos	TKO	2 (6)	28 Sep 2007	Coliseo Olimpico de la UG, Guadalajara, Mexico	
7	Win	6–1	(Mexico) Elizabeth Zamarripa	KO	1 (6)	3 Aug 2007	Arena Coliseo, Guadalajara, Mexico	
6	Win	5–1	(Mexico) Jackeline Sanchez	UD	4	8 Jun 2007	Arena Jalisco, Guadalajara, Mexico	
5	Loss	4–1	(Mexico) Magaly Avalos	UD	6	11 May 2007	Arena Jalisco, Guadalajara, Mexico	
4	Win	4–0	(Mexico) Isabel Gonzalez	UD	4	17 Feb 2007	Plaza de Toros, Puerto Vallarta, Mexico	
3	Win	3–0	(Mexico) Brenda Lopez	KO	3 (4)	10 Nov 2006	Arena Jalisco, Guadalajara, Mexico	
2	Win	2–0	(Mexico) Isabel Gonzalez	UD	4	13 Oct 2006	Arena Jalisco, Guadalajara, Mexico	
1	Win	1–0	(Mexico) Ines Gonzalez	KO	4 (4)	19 Aug 2006	Auditorio de Tonala, Guadalajara, Mexico	Professional debut
