= Salvador Caro Cabrera =

Mexican politician (born 1970)

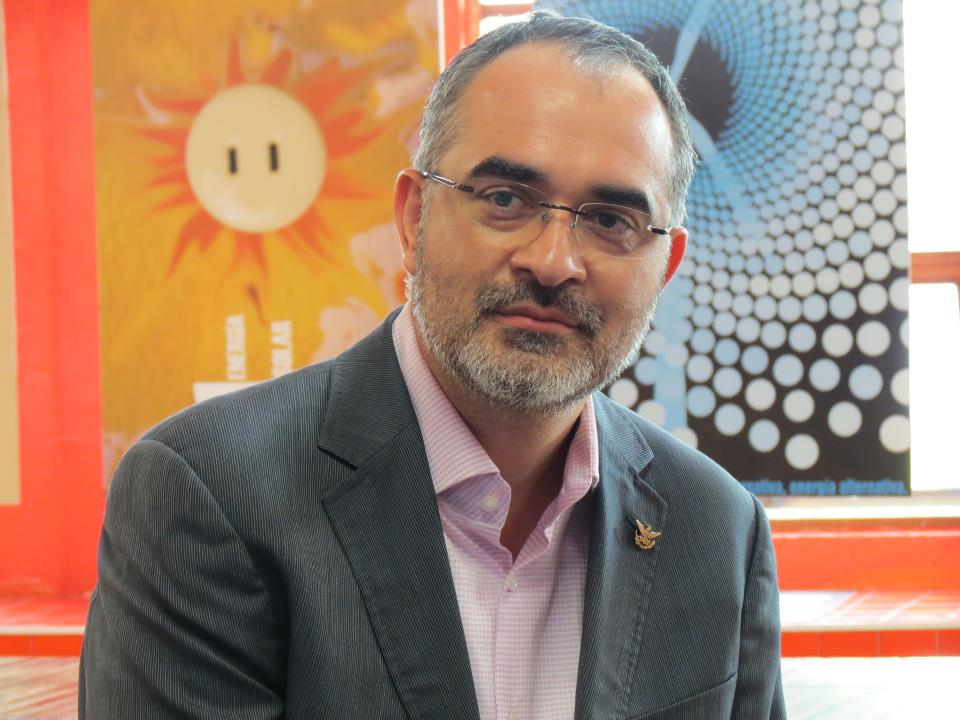
- Born: 21 November 1970 (age 55); Guadalajara, Jalisco, Mexico
- Status: Marries
- Other name: Chava
- Education: Universidad de Guadalajara
- Occupation: Politician
- Political party: PT (2004–2012); MC (2012–present)

Salvador Caro Cabrera (born 21 November 1970) is a Mexican politician from the Citizens' Movement (MC) who formerly belonged to the Labor Party (PT). In the 2009 mid-terms he was elected to the Chamber of Deputies to represent Jalisco's 11th district for the PT during the 61st session of Congress.
