= Ángel Buendía Tirado =

Mexican economist and politician (born 1951)

- Born: 12 May 1951 (age 75); Villahermosa, Tabasco, Mexico
- Occupations: Economist and politician
- Political party: PRI

Ángel Augusto Buendía Tirado (born 12 May 1951) is a Mexican economist and politician affiliated with the Institutional Revolutionary Party (PRI).

He has been elected to the Chamber of Deputies on two occasions: in the 1979 mid-terms (51st Congress), for Tabasco's 1st district, and in the 2003 mid-terms (59th Congress), as a plurinominal deputy.
