= Balancán Municipality =

Coordinates: 17°48′N 91°32′W

Balancán (municipality)
- Municipality
- Coat of arms

- Location of the municipality in Tabasco.
- Country: Mexico
- State: Tabasco

Government
  - Federal electoral district: Tabasco's 1st

Population (2020)
  - Total: 58,524
- Time zone: UTC-6 (Zona Centro)
- Website: ebalancan.gob.mx

Balancán is a municipality in the Mexican state of Tabasco. Its municipal seat is the small town of Balancán de Domínguez.

The municipality reported a population of 58,524 in the 2020 Census, up 3.15% from 2010.
