= Julio César Lizárraga López =

Mexican politician

- Born: 19 October 1972 (age 53); Jalisco, Mexico
- Occupation: Politician
- Political party: PAN

Julio César Lizárraga López (born 19 October 1972) is a Mexican politician from the National Action Party (PAN). In the 2000 general election he was elected to the Chamber of Deputies to represent Jalisco's 11th district during the 58th session of Congress.
