= Balancán de Domínguez =

Balancán, officially Balancán de Domínguez is the city and the head of the municipality of Balancán, one of the 17 municipalities that make up the Mexican state of Tabasco.

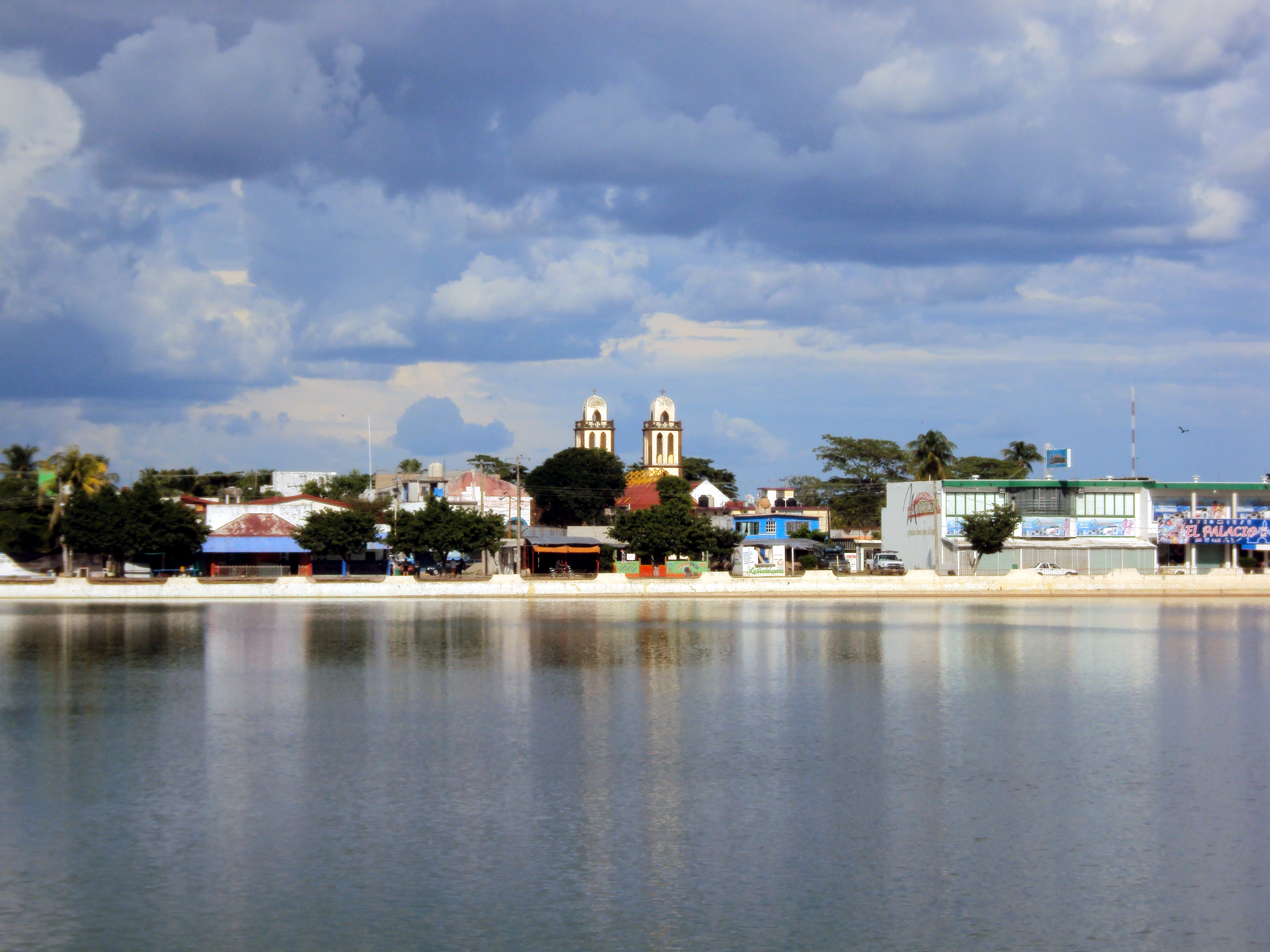

It was founded in 1516 by Mayan immigrants from Chakán Putum, Lakam Há and Tayasal.

Balancán is located in the Usumacinta region and in the Los Ríos subregion.

As of 2020, the city had a population of 13,944 people.
