= Alonso Lizaola de la Torre =

Mexican politician

- Born: 3 March 1973 (age 53); Jalisco, Mexico
- Occupation: Politician
- Political party: PAN

Alonso Manuel Lizaola de la Torre (born 3 March 1973) is a Mexican politician from the National Action Party (PAN). In the 2012 general election he was elected to the Chamber of Deputies to represent Jalisco's 11th district during the 60th session of Congress.
