= Emiliano Zapata Municipality, Tabasco =

Municipality in Tabasco, Mexico

Coordinates: 17°43′59″N 91°40′01″W

Emiliano Zapata
- Municipality
- Location of the municipality in Tabasco
- Country: Mexico
- State: Tabasco

Government
  - Federal electoral district: Tabasco's 1st
- Time zone: UTC-6 (Zona Centro)

Emiliano Zapata is a municipality in the Mexican state of Tabasco.

Demographics

According to the 2020 official census, Emiliano Zapata had a population of 32,181 inhabitants, consisting of 48% male and 52% female residents. This represented a 9.02% population increase compared to the 2010 census figure.

Economy

The municipality engages in international trade. Key imports into Emiliano Zapata have included industrial hardware, primarily iron or steel chain parts (valued at US$14,700) and mechanical fasteners, including screws, bolts, and nuts (valued at US$2,590).

The municipal seat is the city of Emiliano Zapata, Tabasco.
