= Rafael Sánchez Pérez =

Mexican politician

- Born: 24 October 1944; Totatiche, Jalisco, Mexico
- Died: 25 June 2008 (aged 63)
- Occupation: Politician
- Political party: PAN

Rafael Sánchez Pérez (24 October 1944 – 25 June 2008) was a Mexican politician affiliated with the National Action Party (PAN).

Sánchez Pérez was born on 24 October 1944 in Totatiche, Jalisco.

He was elected to the Chamber of Deputies on three occasions:

- in the 1973 mid-terms (49th Congress),
- in the 1997 mid-terms (57th Congress), for Jalisco's 11th district,
- in the 2003 mid-terms (59th Congress), as a plurinominal deputy.

He died in 2008.
