= José Antonio Aysa =

Mexican politician

- Born: 11 January 1943 (age 83); Palizada, Campeche, Mexico
- Occupation: Politician
- Political party: PRI

José Antonio Aysa Bernat (born 11 January 1943) is a Mexican politician from the Institutional Revolutionary Party (PRI). In the 2009 mid-terms he was elected to the Chamber of Deputies to represent Tabasco's 1st district during the 61st session of Congress (2009–2012).
