= Claudia Delgadillo González =

Mexican politician

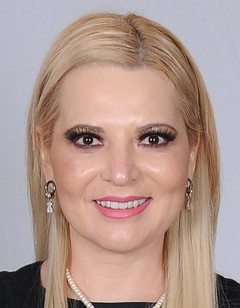
- Claudia Delgadillo González
- Born: 24 July 1972 (age 53)
- Occupation: Politician
- Political party: MORENA

Claudia Delgadillo González (born 24 July 1972) is a Mexican politician currently affiliated with the National Regeneration Movement (MORENA) but previously a member of the Institutional Revolutionary Party (PRI). She currently serves as a regidora (city councilor) in Guadalajara, Jalisco,

Representing the PRI, she was elected to the Chamber of Deputies for Jalisco's 11th district in the 2003 mid-terms and again in the 2012 general election.

In November 2018, she temporarily left her post in Guadalajara to assist the new MORENA federal government in coordinating federal aid programs, particularly conducting a census of program recipients in Guadalajara. She returned to the city council two months later.

She returned to Congress for Jalisco's 11th in the 2021 mid-term election, on the Ecologist Green Party of Mexico (PVEM) ticket.

Delgadillo González contended for the governorship of Jalisco in the 2 June 2024 election, representing Morena. She lost to Pablo Lemus of the Citizens' Movement (MC).
