= Lee Jung-moon =

Korean association football player

Personal information
- Date of birth: 18 March 1998 (age 28)
- Place of birth: Seoul, South Korea
- Height: 1.94 m (6 ft 4 in)
- Positions: Defensive midfielder; centre-back

Team information
- Current team: Chiangrai United
- Number: 5

Youth career
- 2014–2017: Chungnam Machinery High School
- 2017–2018: Yonsei University

Senior career*
Years	Team	Apps	(Gls)
2019–2020	Daejeon Citizen	43	(3)
2021–2022	Jeju United	11	(1)
2022–2023	Seoul E-Land	12	(0)
2024	Jinju Citizen	9	(3)
2024–	Chiangrai United	9	(0)

International career
2017	South Korea U20		
- * Club domestic league appearances and goals as of 9 February 2025

- Lee Jung-moon
- Hangul: 이정문
- RR: I Jeongmun
- MR: I Chŏngmun

Lee Jung-moon (Korean: 이정문; born 18 March 1998) is a South Korean footballer for Thai League 1 club Chiangrai United.

== Career statistics ==
=== Club ===
As of 9 February 2024.

Appearances and goals by club, season and competition
Club	Season	League			National cup		Other		Total	
Club	Season	Division	Apps	Goals	Apps	Goals	Apps	Goals	Apps	Goals
Daejeon Citizen	2019	K League 2	23	1	1	0	0	0	24	1
Daejeon Citizen	2020	K League 2	20	2	2	0	1 (Note: Appearances in promotion play-offs)	0	23	2
Daejeon Citizen	Total		43	3	3	0	1	0	47	3
Jeju United	2021	K League 1	10	1	0	0	0	0	10	1
Jeju United	2022	K League 1	1	0	2	0	0	0	3	0
Jeju United	Total		11	1	2	0	0	0	13	1
Seoul E-Land	2022	K League 2	5	0	0	0	0	0	5	0
Seoul E-Land	2023	K League 2	7	0	1	0	0	0	8	0
Seoul E-Land	Total		12	0	1	0	0	0	13	0
Career total			66	4	6	0	1	0	73	4
