= Northern Region Academy =

Northern Region Academy is a football technical center in Vanuatu. The Academy was founded in December 2015 at Luganville, Santo to serve five provinces in the northern region of Vanuatu.

FIFA's Development Officer Glen Turner and Lambert Maltock, president of the Vanuatu Football Federation, officially opened the center, alongside William Nasak, the Director General of the Youth and Sport, on December 1, 2015.

In 2017, Vanuatu Football Federation picked several players from the Northern Region Academy to play for the National U17 team in a tournament in Tahiti from 11 to 20 February 2017.

== 2017 U-17 players ==
Note: Flags indicate national team as defined under FIFA eligibility rules; some limited exceptions apply. Players may hold more than one non-FIFA nationality.

No.	Pos.	Nation	Player
—	GK	(Vanuatu) VAN	Dgen Leo
—	DF	(Vanuatu) VAN	Zidane Maguekon
—	DF	(Vanuatu) VAN	Glendon Leki
—	DF	(Vanuatu) VAN	Nelsin Rawor
—	DF	(Vanuatu) VAN	Julio Tevanu
—	MF	(Vanuatu) VAN	Jean-Claude Batick
—	MF	(Vanuatu) VAN	Alberick Wequas
—	MF	(Vanuatu) VAN	Tom Saksak
—	MF	(Vanuatu) VAN	Abert Vanva
—	MF	(Vanuatu) VAN	Fred Christion

No.	Pos.	Nation	Player
—	MF	(Vanuatu) VAN	Tyson Gere
—	FW	(Vanuatu) VAN	Andre Damelip
—	FW	(Vanuatu) VAN	Dilland Ngwele
—	FW	(Vanuatu) VAN	Presley Alick

== 2017 U-20 players ==
Note: Flags indicate national team as defined under FIFA eligibility rules; some limited exceptions apply. Players may hold more than one non-FIFA nationality.

No.	Pos.	Nation	Player
—	GK	(Vanuatu) VAN	Andreas Dutch
—	DF	(Vanuatu) VAN	Ben Denly
—	DF	(Vanuatu) VAN	Reginald Ravo
—	DF	(Vanuatu) VAN	Philip Lency
—	DF	(Vanuatu) VAN	Claude Aru
—	MF	(Vanuatu) VAN	Johnwell Bohale
—	MF	(Vanuatu) VAN	Petuel Olie
—	FW	(Vanuatu) VAN	Selwyn Vatu

== Current U-19 players ==
Note: Flags indicate national team as defined under FIFA eligibility rules; some limited exceptions apply. Players may hold more than one non-FIFA nationality.

No.	Pos.	Nation	Player
—	GK	(Vanuatu) VAN	Dgen Leo
—	DF	(Vanuatu) VAN	Zidane Maguekon
—	DF	(Vanuatu) VAN	Glendon Leki
—	DF	(Vanuatu) VAN	Nelsin Rawor
—	DF	(Vanuatu) VAN	Julio Tevanu
—	MF	(Vanuatu) VAN	Jean-Claude Batick
—	MF	(Vanuatu) VAN	Alberick Wequas
—	MF	(Vanuatu) VAN	Tom Saksak
—	MF	(Vanuatu) VAN	Tyson Gere
—	FW	(Vanuatu) VAN	Andre Damelip
—	FW	(Vanuatu) VAN	Dilland Ngwele
—	FW	(Vanuatu) VAN	Presley Alick

No.	Pos.	Nation	Player
—	MF	(Vanuatu) VAN	Obed Hungai
—	MF	(Vanuatu) VAN	Ronaldo Moli
—	GK	(Vanuatu) VAN	Junior Charles Bule
—	MF	(Vanuatu) VAN	Obed Hungai
—	DF	(Vanuatu) VAN	Jah-Vira Turana Gavika
—	MF	(Vanuatu) VAN	Amando Ravo
—	MF	(Vanuatu) VAN	Julian Banga
—	MF	(Vanuatu) VAN	Jordy Tasip
—	DF	(Vanuatu) VAN	Sam Lingban
—	MF	(Vanuatu) VAN	Anthony Peli
—	MF	(Vanuatu) VAN	Vuti Moli
—	MF	(Vanuatu) VAN	Lorenzo Sebastien Obed
