= Francisco Herrera León =

Mexican politician

- Born: 16 September 1966 (age 59); Centla, Tabasco, Mexico
- Occupation: Politician
- Political party: PRI

Francisco Herrera León (born 16 September 1966) is a Mexican politician affiliated with the Institutional Revolutionary Party (PRI).

In the 2003 mid-terms he was elected to the Chamber of Deputies to represent Tabasco's 1st district during the 59th session of Congress.

He was elected to the Senate in the 2006 general election, where he represented the state of Tabasco during the 60th and 61st congressional sessions.
