= Masilakhe Phohlongo =

South African football player

Masilakhe "Scara" Phohlongo (born 5 May 1997) is a South African footballer who currently plays left winger for Highbury F. C. in the South African National First Division. An alumnus of Ajax Cape Town and TS Galaxy F. C., he earned his first senior cap for Bafana Bafana during the 2021 COSAFA Cup.

== Early life ==
Phohlongo was born on 5 May 1997 in Langa in Cape Town, South Africa. but he's originally from Centane, Eastern Cape. He gained the nickname "Scara" as a child because he idolised Emmanuel Ngobese, who was also known as "Scara". He joined Ajax Cape Town's youth academy at the age of 10.

== Club career ==
Phohlongo rose to prominence playing for Ajax's Multichoice Diski Challenge side under coach Vladislav Heric. He was promoted to the Ajax first team in 2016, and he made his Premier Soccer League debut against Bloemfontein Celtic during the 2016/17 season. In 2020, he left Ajax for TS Galaxy F. C., where he played two seasons, making 36 appearances and scoring six goals. He made his first start for Galaxy in January 2021 in a 1–1 draw against Orlando Pirates. In May that year at Mbombela Stadium, in another game against the Orlando Pirates, he scored the only goal of the match in the third minute. Galaxy awarded him Goal of the Season for the goal.

At the end of the 2022/23 season, Phohlongo's contract at Galaxy expired and was not renewed. He signed a one-year contract with Baroka F. C. in October 2023.

== International appearances ==
In May 2017, Phohlongo was called up to the Amajita squad that contested the 2017 FIFA U-20 World Cup in South Korea.

In August 2017, Bafana Bafana head coach Stuart Baxter announced that Phohlongo would join the senior Bafana Bafana squad at the 2018 African Nations Championship qualifiers. He earned his first senior cap playing for Bafana Bafana in the 2021 COSAFA Cup in Gqeberha, South Africa.
