= Kim Seung-woo (footballer) =

South Korean footballer (born 1998)

Personal information
- Date of birth: 25 March 1998 (age 28)
- Height: 1.84 m (6 ft 0 in)
- Position: Centre-back

Youth career
- –2018: Yonsei University

Senior career*
Years	Team	Apps	(Gls)
2018–2022	Jeju United	9	(0)
2021	→ Busan IPark (loan)	19	(0)
2022–2024	Gwangju FC	12	(0)
2025	Chungbuk Cheongju FC	1	(0)

International career^{‡}
2012	South Korea U14	2	(0)
2015	South Korea U17	2	(0)
2017	South Korea U20	5	(1)
- * Club domestic league appearances and goals as of 7 January 2026 ‡ National team caps and goals as of 14:18, 28 May 2020 (UTC)

- Kim Seung-woo
- Hangul: 김승우
- RR: Gim Seungu
- MR: Kim Sŭngu

Kim Seung-woo (Korean: 김승우; born 25 March 1998) is a South Korean professional footballer who plays as a centre-back.

== Career statistics ==
=== Club ===
As of 24 February 2021.

Club	Season	League			FA Cup		Other		Total	
Club	Season	Division	Apps	Goals	Apps	Goals	Apps	Goals	Apps	Goals
Jeju United	2018	K League 1	0	0	0	0	0	0	0	0
Jeju United	2019	K League 1	8	0	1	0	0	0	9	0
Jeju United	2020	K League 2	1	0	0	0	0	0	1	0
Busan IPark	2021	K League 2	19	0	1	0	0	0	20	0
Gwangju FC	2022	K League 2	0	0	0	0	0	0	0	0
Career total			28	0	2	0	0	0	30	0
