= Rafael Sánchez Cabrales =

Mexican politician (born 1963)

- Born: 18 September 1963 (age 62); Tabasco, Mexico
- Occupation: Politician
- Political party: PRD

Rafael Elías Sánchez Cabrales (born 18 September 1963) is a Mexican politician from the Party of the Democratic Revolution (PRD). In the 2006 general election he was elected to the Chamber of Deputies to represent Tabasco's 1st district during the 60th session of Congress (2006–2009).
