= Rafael Sánchez (footballer) =

Venezuelan footballer (born 1998)

Personal information
- Full name: Rafael Andrés Sánchez Islas
- Date of birth: 1 February 1998 (age 28)
- Place of birth: Boconó, Venezuela
- Height: 1.88 m (6 ft 2 in)
- Position: Goalkeeper

Team information
- Current team: Aragua
- Number: 23

Youth career
- –2016: Deportivo Táchira

Senior career*
Years	Team	Apps	(Gls)
2016–2017	Deportivo Táchira	0	(0)
2018	MKS Kalwarianka	15	(0)
2019–	Aragua	1	(0)
- * Club domestic league appearances and goals as of 25 February 2019

Rafael Andrés Sánchez Islas (born 1 February 1998) is a Venezuelan footballer who plays as a goalkeeper for Venezuelan Primera División side Aragua FC.

== Career ==
=== Aragua FC ===
Aragua FC announced the signing of Sánchez on 13 December 2018.

== International career ==
Sánchez was called up to the Venezuela under-20 side for the 2017 FIFA U-20 World Cup.

== Career statistics ==
=== Club ===
As of 22 August 2017

Club performance		League		Cup		Continental		Total	
Club	Season	Apps	Goals	Apps	Goals	Apps	Goals	Apps	Goals
Venezuela		Primera División		Copa Venezuela		Copa Libertadores		Total	
Deportivo Táchira									
Deportivo Táchira	2016	0	0	0	0	0	0	0	0
Deportivo Táchira	2017	0	0	0	0	0	0	0	0
Total		0	0	0	0	0	0	0	0
Total	Venezuela	0	0	0	0	0	0	0	0
Total	Career total	0	0	0	0	0	0	0	0

== Honours ==
Venezuela U-20

- FIFA U-20 World Cup: Runner-up 2017
- South American Youth Football Championship: Third Place 2017
