= 1973 Mexican legislative election =

Legislative elections were held in Mexico on 1 July 1973. The Institutional Revolutionary Party won 189 of the 231 seats in the Chamber of Deputies. Voter turnout was 60%.

== Results ==
| Party | Votes | % | Seats | +/– |
|---|---|---|---|---|
| Institutional Revolutionary Party | 10,458,618 | 77.38 | 189 | +11 |
| National Action Party | 2,207,069 | 16.33 | 25 | +5 |
| Popular Socialist Party | 541,833 | 4.01 | 10 | 0 |
| Authentic Party of the Mexican Revolution | 272,339 | 2.01 | 7 | +2 |
| Non-registered candidates | 36,858 | 0.27 | 0 | 0 |
| Total | 13,516,717 | 100.00 | 231 | +18 |
| Valid votes | 13,516,717 | 90.05 | | |
| Invalid/blank votes | 1,493,267 | 9.95 | | |
| Total votes | 15,009,984 | 100.00 | | |
| Registered voters/turnout | 24,890,261 | 60.30 | | |
Source: Nohlen
