= Vanuatu national under-18 football team =

Vanuatu U18
- Association: Vanuatu Football Federation
- Confederation: OFC (Oceania)
- Head coach: (Northern Ireland) Paul Munster
- Captain: Jayson Bule
- Top scorer: Armando Ravo (1)
- FIFA code: VAN
| First colours | Second colours |

First international
- New Caledonia 3 - 1 Vanuatu (Port Vila, Vanuatu; August 15, 2019)

Biggest defeat
- New Caledonia 3 - 1 Vanuatu (Port Vila, Vanuatu; August 15, 2019)

OFC Youth Development Tournament
- Appearances: 1 (2019)
- Best result: 5th Place

The Vanuatu national under-18 football team is the national U-18 team of Vanuatu and is controlled by the Vanuatu Football Federation.

== History ==
The Vanuatu national under-18 football team was founded in 2019 and invited for the OFC Youth Development Tournament 2019. This tournament, established by the Oceania Football Confederation and UEFA, was created so that the gap between the U-16 and U-19 could be make smaller.

== Current squad ==
The following players were called up for the OFC Youth Development Tournament 2019 from 15–23 August 2019, held in Port Vila, Vanuatu.

Caps and goals updated as of 16 August 2019 after the game against New Caledonia U18.

| No. | Pos. | Player | Date of birth (age) | Caps | Goals | Club |
|---|---|---|---|---|---|---|
| 1 | GK | James Chilia | 23 March 2001 (age 25) | 3 | 0 | (Vanuatu Football Federation) Tupuji Imere |
| 20 | GK | Jimson Shem | 28 February 2003 (age 23) | 0 | 0 | (Vanuatu Football Federation) |
| 23 | GK | Brendon Tankon | 24 July 2003 (age 23) | 0 | 0 | (Vanuatu Football Federation) Mauriki |
| 2 | DF | Junior Okao | 1 June 2002 (age 24) | 3 | 0 | (Vanuatu Football Federation) |
| 3 | DF | Joshua Tokio | | 3 | 0 | (Vanuatu Football Federation) |
| 4 | DF | Julian Ala | 8 April 2001 (age 25) | 3 | 0 | (Vanuatu Football Federation) Sia-Raga |
| 5 | DF | Francois Atel | 10 May 2002 (age 24) | 3 | 0 | (Vanuatu Football Federation) Ifira Black Bird |
| 6 | DF | Alandro Sau | 14 November 2002 (age 23) | 3 | 0 | (Vanuatu Football Federation) Sia-Raga |
| 12 | DF | Austin Holi | 26 May 2003 (age 23) | 3 | 0 | (Vanuatu Football Federation) |
| 15 | DF | Joel Botleng | 8 August 2002 (age 24) | 2 | 0 | (Vanuatu Football Federation) Siaraga LGV |
| 17 | DF | Nicholas Kings | 12 September 2001 (age 25) | 3 | 0 | (Vanuatu Football Federation) Mauriki |
| 7 | MF | Julian Banga | 23 February 2002 (age 24) | 3 | 0 | (Vanuatu Football Federation) |
| 8 | MF | Chrislee Karu | 21 August 2002 (age 24) | 3 | 0 | (Vanuatu Football Federation) |
| 11 | MF | Pietro Takaro | 7 April 2002 (age 24) | 2 | 0 | (Vanuatu Football Federation) |
| 13 | MF | William Tasau | 22 May 2002 (age 24) | 3 | 0 | (Vanuatu Football Federation) |
| 14 | MF | Bebeto Rurueli | 20 June 2001 (age 25) | 0 | 0 | (Vanuatu Football Federation) |
| 16 | MF | Armando Ravo | 12 December 2002 (age 23) | 3 | 1 | (Vanuatu Football Federation) Malampa Revivors |
| 19 | MF | Nimruken Klen | 13 March 2001 (age 25) | 2 | 0 | (Vanuatu Football Federation) |
| 9 | FW | Jonah Abel | 10 June 2002 (age 24) | 3 | 0 | (Vanuatu Football Federation) |
| 10 | FW | Jayson Bule | 21 January 2001 (age 25) | 3 | 0 | (Vanuatu Football Federation) Sia-Raga |
| 18 | FW | Simione Iwai | 16 September 2002 (age 24) | 3 | 0 | (Vanuatu Football Federation) |
