= 2017 UEFA Youth Olympic Futsal Qualifying Tournament =

The 2017 UEFA Youth Olympic Futsal Qualifying Tournament was an international youth futsal competition organised by UEFA as qualifying for the futsal tournament at the 2018 Summer Youth Olympics in Buenos Aires. Two under-18 national teams each from Europe qualify for the boys' tournament and the girls' tournament.

Players born between 1 January 2000 and 31 December 2003 were eligible to compete in the tournament, which was played in various venues between 1–4 November 2017.

== Format ==
The teams were drawn into groups of four teams (four groups for men's, two groups for women's). Each group was played in single round-robin format at one of the teams which were selected as hosts.

- For the women's tournament, the two group winners qualified for the 2018 Summer Youth Olympics girls' futsal tournament.
- For the men's tournament, the two best-ranked group winners, apart from those already qualified for the girls' tournament, qualified for the 2018 Summer Youth Olympics boys' futsal tournament.

== Men's tournament ==
2017 UEFA Youth Olympic Futsal Qualifying Tournament – Men's
Tournament details
- Host countries: Serbia; Slovakia; Croatia; Slovenia
- Dates: 1–4 November 2017
- Teams: 16 (from 1 confederation)
- Venue(s): 4 (in 4 host cities)

Tournament statistics
- Matches played: 24
- Goals scored: 202 (8.42 per match)

The top 16 (out of 55) UEFA members in the UEFA men's futsal rankings were invited to the tournament.

- Azerbaijan
- Belgium
- Croatia **(H)**
- Czech Republic
- Hungary
- Italy
- Kazakhstan
- Netherlands
- Portugal
- Romania
- **Russia**
- Serbia **(H)**
- **Slovakia** **(H)**
- Slovenia **(H)**
- Spain
- Ukraine

Notes

- Teams in **bold** qualified for the Olympics.
- (H): Qualification group hosts

All times CET (UTC+1).

=== Group A ===
Pos	Team	Pld	W	D	L	GF	GA	GD	Pts
1	Portugal	3	3	0	0	31	10	+21	**9**
2	Ukraine	3	1	1	1	13	13	0	**4**
3	Serbia (H)	3	1	0	2	8	21	−13	**3**
4	Hungary	3	0	1	2	8	16	−8	**1**

Source: UEFA
(H) Hosts
1 November 2017
17:00

Portugal	8–3	Hungary

Vlade Divac Sports Hall, Vrnjačka Banja
1 November 2017
20:00

Serbia	1–5	Ukraine

Vlade Divac Sports Hall, Vrnjačka Banja

2 November 2017
17:00

Ukraine	4–8	Portugal

Vlade Divac Sports Hall, Vrnjačka Banja
2 November 2017
20:00

Serbia	4–1	Hungary

Vlade Divac Sports Hall, Vrnjačka Banja

4 November 2017
11:00

Hungary	4–4	Ukraine

Vlade Divac Sports Hall, Vrnjačka Banja
4 November 2017
14:00

Portugal	15–3	Serbia

Vlade Divac Sports Hall, Vrnjačka Banja

=== Group B ===
Pos	Team	Pld	W	D	L	GF	GA	GD	Pts
1	Russia	3	3	0	0	34	3	+31	**9**
2	Slovakia (H)	3	2	0	1	16	7	+9	**6**
3	Netherlands	3	1	0	2	9	10	−1	**3**
4	Azerbaijan	3	0	0	3	0	39	−39	**0**

Source: UEFA
(H) Hosts
1 November 2017
16:00

Russia	7–2	Netherlands

Niké Aréna, Prievidza
1 November 2017
18:30

Slovakia	12–0	Azerbaijan

Niké Aréna, Prievidza

2 November 2017
16:00

Azerbaijan	0–20	Russia

Niké Aréna, Prievidza
2 November 2017
18:30

Slovakia	3–0	Netherlands

Niké Aréna, Prievidza

4 November 2017
13:00

Netherlands	7–0	Azerbaijan

Niké Aréna, Prievidza
4 November 2017
15:30

Russia	7–1	Slovakia

Niké Aréna, Prievidza

=== Group C ===
Pos	Team	Pld	W	D	L	GF	GA	GD	Pts
1	Spain	3	3	0	0	23	2	+21	**9**
2	Croatia (H)	3	2	0	1	10	6	+4	**6**
3	Belgium	3	1	0	2	9	13	−4	**3**
4	Kazakhstan	3	0	0	3	4	25	−21	**0**

Source: UEFA
(H) Hosts
1 November 2017
17:00

Spain	6–1	Belgium

Mladost Hall, Karlovac
1 November 2017
19:30

Croatia	6–0	Kazakhstan

Mladost Hall, Karlovac

2 November 2017
17:00

Kazakhstan	0–13	Spain

Mladost Hall, Karlovac
2 November 2017
19:30

Croatia	3–2	Belgium

Mladost Hall, Karlovac

4 November 2017
10:00

Belgium	6–4	Kazakhstan

Mladost Hall, Karlovac
4 November 2017
12:30

Spain	4–1	Croatia

Mladost Hall, Karlovac

=== Group D ===
Pos	Team	Pld	W	D	L	GF	GA	GD	Pts
1	Italy	3	2	1	0	11	3	+8	**7**
2	Czech Republic	3	1	2	0	9	5	+4	**5**
3	Slovenia (H)	3	1	0	2	9	13	−4	**3**
4	Romania	3	0	1	2	8	16	−8	**1**

Source: UEFA
(H) Hosts
1 November 2017
17:30

Slovenia	1–5	Czech Republic

Podčetrtek Sports Hall, Podčetrtek
1 November 2017
19:30

Italy	6–1	Romania

Podčetrtek Sports Hall, Podčetrtek

2 November 2017
17:30

Czech Republic	1–1	Italy

Podčetrtek Sports Hall, Podčetrtek
2 November 2017
19:30

Slovenia	7–4	Romania

Podčetrtek Sports Hall, Podčetrtek

4 November 2017
14:00

Romania	3–3	Czech Republic

Podčetrtek Sports Hall, Podčetrtek
4 November 2017
16:00

Italy	4–1	Slovenia

Podčetrtek Sports Hall, Podčetrtek

=== Overall ranking ===
Pos	Grp	Team	Pld	W	D	L	GF	GA	GD	Pts	Qualification
1	B	Russia	3	3	0	0	34	3	+31	9	2018 Youth Olympics
2	A	Portugal	3	3	0	0	31	10	+21	9	Ineligible (Note: Portugal and Spain qualified for the Youth Olympic girls' futsal tournament.)
3	C	Spain	3	3	0	0	23	2	+21	9	Ineligible
4	D	Italy	3	2	1	0	11	3	+8	7	Declined to enter (Note: Italy chose to enter the Youth Olympic boys' beach handball tournament.)
5	B	Slovakia	3	2	0	1	16	7	+9	6	2018 Youth Olympics
6	C	Croatia	3	2	0	1	10	6	+4	6	
7	D	Czech Republic	3	1	2	0	9	5	+4	5	
8	A	Ukraine	3	1	1	1	13	13	0	4	
9	B	Netherlands	3	1	0	2	9	10	−1	3	
10	D	Slovenia	3	1	0	2	9	13	−4	3	
11	C	Belgium	3	1	0	2	9	13	−4	3	
12	A	Serbia	3	1	0	2	8	21	−13	3	
13	A	Hungary	3	0	1	2	8	16	−8	1	
14	D	Romania	3	0	1	2	8	16	−8	1	
15	C	Kazakhstan	3	0	0	3	4	25	−21	0	
16	B	Azerbaijan	3	0	0	3	0	39	−39	0	

Source: UEFA

== Women's tournament ==
2017 UEFA Youth Olympic Futsal Qualifying Tournament – Women's
Tournament details
- Host countries: Portugal; Spain
- Dates: 1–4 November 2017
- Teams: 8 (from 1 confederation)
- Venue(s): 4 (in 4 host cities)

Tournament statistics
- Matches played: 12
- Goals scored: 98 (8.17 per match)

The top eight (out of 55) UEFA members in the UEFA men's futsal rankings were invited to the tournament.

- Azerbaijan
- Italy
- Kazakhstan
- **Portugal** **(H)**
- Romania
- Russia
- **Spain** **(H)**
- Ukraine

Notes

- Teams in **bold** qualified for the Olympics.
- (H): Qualification group hosts

All times CET (UTC+1).

=== Group A ===
Pos	Team	Pld	W	D	L	GF	GA	GD	Pts
1	Portugal (H)	3	3	0	0	31	1	+30	**9**
2	Italy	3	2	0	1	6	9	−3	**6**
3	Azerbaijan	3	0	1	2	2	14	−12	**1**
4	Ukraine	3	0	1	2	4	19	−15	**1**

Source: UEFA
(H) Hosts
1 November 2017
18:00

Portugal	13–1	Ukraine

Pavilhão Municipal de Caminha, Caminha
1 November 2017
20:15

Italy	2–0	Azerbaijan

Pavilhão Municipal de Caminha, Caminha

2 November 2017
18:00

Ukraine	1–4	Italy

Pavilhão Municipal de Caminha, Caminha
2 November 2017
20:10

Portugal	10–0	Azerbaijan

Pavilhão Municipal de Caminha, Caminha

4 November 2017
10:00

Azerbaijan	2–2	Ukraine

Pavilhão Municipal de Caminha, Caminha
4 November 2017
12:15

Italy	0–8	Portugal

Pavilhão Municipal de Caminha, Caminha

=== Group B ===
Pos	Team	Pld	W	D	L	GF	GA	GD	Pts
1	Spain (H)	3	3	0	0	30	2	+28	**9**
2	Russia	3	2	0	1	16	5	+11	**6**
3	Romania	3	1	0	2	8	14	−6	**3**
4	Kazakhstan	3	0	0	3	1	34	−33	**0**

Source: UEFA
(H) Hosts
1 November 2017
18:00

Russia	5–0	Romania

Pabellón Polideportivo – Ciudad del Fútbol, Las Rozas
1 November 2017
20:15

Spain	16–1	Kazakhstan

Pabellón Polideportivo – Ciudad del Fútbol, Las Rozas

2 November 2017
18:00

Kazakhstan	0–11	Russia

Pabellón Polideportivo – Ciudad del Fútbol, Las Rozas
2 November 2017
20:15

Spain	9–1	Romania

Pabellón Polideportivo – Ciudad del Fútbol, Las Rozas

4 November 2017
10:30

Romania	7–0	Kazakhstan

Pabellón Polideportivo – Ciudad del Fútbol, Las Rozas
4 November 2017
13:00

Russia	0–5	Spain

Pabellón Polideportivo – Ciudad del Fútbol, Las Rozas

=== Overall ranking ===
Pos	Grp	Team	Pld	W	D	L	GF	GA	GD	Pts	Qualification
1	A	Portugal	3	3	0	0	31	1	+30	9	2018 Youth Olympics
2	B	Spain	3	3	0	0	30	2	+28	9	2018 Youth Olympics
3	B	Russia	3	2	0	1	16	5	+11	6	
4	A	Italy	3	2	0	1	6	9	−3	6	
5	B	Romania	3	1	0	2	8	14	−6	3	
6	A	Azerbaijan	3	0	1	2	2	14	−12	1	
7	A	Ukraine	3	0	1	2	4	19	−15	1	
8	B	Kazakhstan	3	0	0	3	1	34	−33	0	

Source: UEFA

== Qualified teams for Youth Olympics ==
The following two teams from UEFA qualified for the 2018 Summer Youth Olympics boys' futsal tournament.

Team	Qualified on	Previous appearances in Youth Olympics
Russia	4 November 2017	0 (debut)
Slovakia	19 August 2018 (confirmed)	0 (debut)

The following two teams from UEFA qualified for the 2018 Summer Youth Olympics girls' futsal tournament.

Team	Qualified on	Previous appearances in Youth Olympics
Portugal	4 November 2017	0 (debut)
Spain	4 November 2017	0 (debut)

Notes

- Since teams from the same association cannot play in both the Youth Olympics boys' and girls' tournaments, if teams from the same association qualify for both tournaments, they must nominate their preferred qualification team, and the next best ranked team will qualify instead if one of the qualified teams are not nominated.
- As participation in team sports (futsal, beach handball, field hockey, and rugby sevens) are limited to one team per gender for each National Olympic Committee (NOC), the participating teams of the 2018 Youth Olympics futsal tournament will be confirmed by mid-2018 after each qualified NOC confirms their participation and any unused qualification places are reallocated.
