= 2017 OFC Youth Futsal Tournament =

Tournament details
- Host country: New Zealand
- City: Auckland
- Dates: 4–7 October 2017
- Teams: 7 (men's) + 4 (women's) (from 1 confederation)
- Venue: 1 (in 1 host city)

The 2017 OFC Youth Futsal tournament was the first edition of the OFC Youth Futsal Tournament (also known as the OFC U-18 Futsal Tournament), the youth international futsal championship organised by the Oceania Football Confederation (OFC) for the men's and women's national under-18 teams of Oceania. The tournament was held at the Bruce Pulman Arena in Auckland, New Zealand between 4–7 October 2017.

The winners of both the men's and the women's competition – with the exception of New Caledonia who are not an Olympic nation – would directly qualify for the futsal tournament at the 2018 Summer Youth Olympics in Buenos Aires, Argentina. However the qualifying teams cannot be from the same Member Association, so where a country has entered both the men's and women's events, the Member Association must nominate their preferred qualification team. It was the first time in Oceania footballs' history that a men's and a women's tournament has been combined.

== Teams ==
=== Men's ===
A total of seven (out of 11) OFC members entered the tournament.

- American Samoa
- New Caledonia
- New Zealand
- Samoa
- **Solomon Islands**
- Tonga
- Vanuatu

Notes

- Teams in **bold** qualified for the Olympics.

=== Women's ===
A total of five (out of 11) OFC members entered the tournament, but two teams withdrew prior to the draw. The Auckland Football Federation were also invited to compete.

- New Caledonia (withdrew)
- **New Zealand**
- Samoa
- Tonga
- Vanuatu (withdrew)

Notes

- Teams in **bold** qualified for the Olympics.

== Venue ==
The matches were played at the Bruce Pulman Arena in Auckland.

== Men's tournament ==
2017 OFC Youth Futsal Tournament – Men's
Tournament details
- Host country: New Zealand
- City: Auckland
- Dates: 4–7 October 2017
- Teams: 7 (from 1 confederation)
- Venue: 1 (in 1 host city)

Final positions
- Champions: Solomon Islands (1st title)
- Runners-up: New Zealand
- Third place: Vanuatu
- Fourth place: New Caledonia

Tournament statistics
- Matches played: 21
- Goals scored: 222 (10.57 per match)
- Attendance: 3,900 (186 per match)
- Top scorer: (Solomon Islands) Raphael Le'ai
- Best player: (Solomon Islands) Raphael Le'ai
- Best goalkeeper: (New Zealand) Patrick Steele

The tournament was played in single round-robin format. The draw for the fixtures was held on 6 September 2017 at the OFC Headquarters in Auckland, New Zealand.

All times are local, NZDT (UTC+13).

Pos	Team	Pld	W	D	L	GF	GA	GD	Pts	Qualification
1	Solomon Islands	6	6	0	0	64	7	+57	18	2018 Youth Olympics
2	New Zealand (H)	6	4	1	1	49	11	+38	13	
3	Vanuatu	6	3	1	2	38	26	+12	10	
4	New Caledonia (Note: New Caledonia were not eligible for the Youth Olympics.)	6	3	0	3	24	21	+3	9	
5	Samoa	6	2	1	3	20	30	−10	7	
6	Tonga	6	1	0	5	12	64	−52	3	
7	American Samoa	6	0	1	5	15	63	−48	1	

Source: OFC
(H) Hosts
Notes:
4 October 2017
10:00

New Zealand	13–1	Tonga
	Report

Bruce Pulman Arena (Court 1), Auckland
Attendance: 200
4 October 2017
10:00

Vanuatu	2–3	New Caledonia
	Report

Bruce Pulman Arena (Court 2), Auckland
Attendance: 200
4 October 2017
13:00

American Samoa	0–18	Solomon Islands
	Report

Bruce Pulman Arena (Court 1), Auckland
Attendance: 200

4 October 2017
13:00

Vanuatu	6–4	Samoa
	Report

Bruce Pulman Arena (Court 2), Auckland
Attendance: 200
4 October 2017
16:00

Tonga	3–9	New Caledonia
	Report

Bruce Pulman Arena (Court 1), Auckland
Attendance: 200
4 October 2017
16:00

New Zealand	1–6	Solomon Islands
	Report

Bruce Pulman Arena (Court 2), Auckland
Attendance: 300

5 October 2017
10:00

New Caledonia	2–3	Solomon Islands
	Report

Bruce Pulman Arena (Court 1), Auckland
Attendance: 150
5 October 2017
10:00

Tonga	3–7	Samoa
	Report

Bruce Pulman Arena (Court 2), Auckland
Attendance: 200
5 October 2017
13:00

New Zealand	19–2	American Samoa
	Report

Bruce Pulman Arena (Court 1), Auckland
Attendance: 200

5 October 2017
13:00

Tonga	0–16	Vanuatu
	Report

Bruce Pulman Arena (Court 2), Auckland
Attendance: 150
5 October 2017
16:00

Solomon Islands	8–0	Samoa
	Report

Bruce Pulman Arena (Court 1), Auckland
Attendance: 200
5 October 2017
16:00

New Caledonia	9–2	American Samoa
	Report

Bruce Pulman Arena (Court 2), Auckland
Attendance: 200

6 October 2017
10:00

Samoa	4–4	American Samoa
	Report

Bruce Pulman Arena (Court 1), Auckland
Attendance: 100
6 October 2017
10:00

Solomon Islands	12–2	Vanuatu
	Report

Bruce Pulman Arena (Court 2), Auckland
Attendance: 100
6 October 2017
13:00

New Caledonia	0–6	New Zealand
	Report

Bruce Pulman Arena (Court 1), Auckland
Attendance: 200

6 October 2017
13:00

Solomon Islands	17–2	Tonga
	Report

Bruce Pulman Arena (Court 2), Auckland
Attendance: 200
6 October 2017
16:00

American Samoa	5–10	Vanuatu
	Report

Bruce Pulman Arena (Court 1), Auckland
Attendance: 100
6 October 2017
16:00

Samoa	0–8	New Zealand
	Report

Bruce Pulman Arena (Court 2), Auckland
Attendance: 200

7 October 2017
10:00

Vanuatu	2–2	New Zealand
	Report

Bruce Pulman Arena (Court 1), Auckland
Attendance: 200
7 October 2017
10:00

American Samoa	2–3	Tonga
	Report

Bruce Pulman Arena (Court 2), Auckland
Attendance: 200
7 October 2017
11:30

Samoa	5–1	New Caledonia
	Report

Bruce Pulman Arena (Court 1), Auckland
Attendance: 200

== Women's tournament ==
2017 OFC Youth Futsal Tournament – Women's
Tournament details
- Host country: New Zealand
- City: Auckland
- Dates: 4–6 October 2017
- Teams: 4 (from 1 confederation)
- Venue: 1 (in 1 host city)

Final positions
- Champions: New Zealand (1st title)
- Runners-up: Tonga
- Third place: Samoa
- Fourth place: Auckland Football Federation

Tournament statistics
- Matches played: 12
- Goals scored: 88 (7.33 per match)
- Attendance: 2,450 (204 per match)
- Top scorer: (New Zealand) Macey Fraser
- Best player: (New Zealand) Macey Fraser
- Best goalkeeper: (New Zealand) Rylee Godbold

The tournament was played in double round-robin format. The draw for the fixtures was held on 25 August 2017 at the OFC Headquarters in Auckland, New Zealand.

All times are local, NZDT (UTC+13).

Pos	Team	Pld	W	D	L	GF	GA	GD	Pts	Qualification
1	New Zealand (H)	6	6	0	0	45	9	+36	**18**	Declined to enter (Note: New Zealand chose to enter the Youth Olympic girls' rugby sevens tournament.)
2	Tonga	6	2	1	3	14	26	−12	**7**	2018 Youth Olympics
3	Samoa	6	2	0	4	16	30	−14	**6**	
4	Auckland Football Federation (Note: Auckland Football Federation were invited to compete.)	6	1	1	4	13	23	−10	**4**	

Source: OFC
(H) Hosts
Notes:
4 October 2017
11:30

Tonga	1–10	New Zealand
	Report

Bruce Pulman Arena (Court 1), Auckland
Attendance: 200
4 October 2017
11:30

Samoa	4–2	Auckland Football Federation
	Report

Bruce Pulman Arena (Court 2), Auckland
Attendance: 250

4 October 2017
14:30

New Zealand	12–2	Samoa
	Report

Bruce Pulman Arena (Court 1), Auckland
Attendance: 200
4 October 2017
14:30

Auckland Football Federation	2–2	Tonga
	Report

Bruce Pulman Arena (Court 2), Auckland
Attendance: 200

5 October 2017
11:30

Samoa	3–4	Tonga
	Report

Bruce Pulman Arena (Court 1), Auckland
Attendance: 200
5 October 2017
11:30

Auckland Football Federation	1–3	New Zealand
	Report

Bruce Pulman Arena (Court 2), Auckland
Attendance: 200

5 October 2017
14:30

New Zealand	6–0	Tonga
	Report

Bruce Pulman Arena (Court 1), Auckland
Attendance: 200
5 October 2017
14:30

Auckland Football Federation	1–4	Samoa
	Report

Bruce Pulman Arena (Court 2), Auckland
Attendance: 200

6 October 2017
11:30

Samoa	2–6	New Zealand
	Report

Bruce Pulman Arena (Court 1), Auckland
Attendance: 200
6 October 2017
11:30

Tonga	2–4	Auckland Football Federation
	Report

Bruce Pulman Arena (Court 2), Auckland
Attendance: 200

6 October 2017
14:30

Tonga	5–1	Samoa
	Report

Bruce Pulman Arena (Court 1), Auckland
Attendance: 200
6 October 2017
14:30

New Zealand	8–3	Auckland Football Federation
	Report

Bruce Pulman Arena (Court 2), Auckland
Attendance: 200

== Qualified teams for Youth Olympics ==
The following team from OFC qualified for the 2018 Summer Youth Olympics boys' futsal tournament.

Team	Qualified on	Previous appearances in Youth Olympics
Solomon Islands	6 October 2017	0 (debut)

The following team from OFC qualified for the 2018 Summer Youth Olympics girls' futsal tournament.

Team	Qualified on	Previous appearances in Youth Olympics
Tonga	19 August 2018 (confirmed)	0 (debut)

Notes

- Since teams from the same association cannot play in both the Youth Olympics boys' and girls' tournaments, if teams from the same association qualify for both tournaments, they must nominate their preferred qualification team, and the runners-up will qualify instead if the winners are not nominated.
- As participation in team sports (Futsal, Beach handball, Field hockey, and Rugby sevens) are limited to one team per gender for each National Olympic Committee (NOC), the participating teams of the 2018 Youth Olympics futsal tournament will be confirmed by mid-2018 after each qualified NOC confirms their participation and any unused qualification places are reallocated.
