= 2018 South American Under-18 Futsal Championship =

CONMEBOL Sudamericano de Futsal Sub-18 Paraguay 2018

Tournament details
- Host country: Paraguay
- City: Luque
- Dates: 22–29 March
- Teams: 10 (from 1 confederation)
- Venue: 1 (in 1 host city)

Final positions
- Champions: Brazil (2nd title)
- Runners-up: Argentina
- Third place: Colombia
- Fourth place: Venezuela

Tournament statistics
- Matches played: 27
- Goals scored: 201 (7.44 per match)

The 2018 South American Under-18 Futsal Championship was the 2nd edition of the South American Under-18 Futsal Championship (Spanish: CONMEBOL Sudamericano de Futsal Sub-18), the biennial international youth futsal championship organised by the CONMEBOL for the men's under-18 national teams of South America. The tournament was held in Luque, Paraguay between 22 and 29 March 2018. Different from the first edition, it was played as an under-18 tournament instead of an under-17 tournament.

The tournament served as qualifying for the futsal tournament at the 2018 Summer Youth Olympics in Buenos Aires, with the winner qualifying for the boys' tournament together with hosts Argentina which qualified automatically (if Argentina were to win the tournament, the runner-up would qualify)

== Teams ==
All ten CONMEBOL member national teams entered the tournament.

- Argentina
- Bolivia
- Brazil (title holders)
- Chile
- Colombia
- Ecuador
- Paraguay (hosts)
- Peru
- Uruguay
- Venezuela

== Venues ==
All matches are played in one venue: Centro de Entrenamiento Olímpico in Luque.

== Draw ==
The draw of the tournament was held on 19 March 2018, 11:30 PYST (UTC−3), at the headquarters of the Paraguayan Football Association in Asunción. The ten teams were drawn into two groups of five teams. The hosts Paraguay and the defending champions Brazil were seeded into Groups A and B respectively, while the remaining teams were placed into four "pairing pots" according to their results in the 2016 South American Under-17 Futsal Championship: Argentina–Venezuela, Peru–Ecuador, Uruguay–Bolivia, Chile–Colombia.

== Squads ==
Each team had to submit a squad of 12 players, including a minimum of two goalkeepers (Regulations Article 4.1). Players born on or after 1 January 2000 are eligible to compete in the tournament.

== Group stage ==
The top two teams of each group advance to the semi-finals, while the teams in third, fourth and fifth advance to the fifth place, seventh place, and ninth place play-offs respectively. The teams are ranked according to points (3 points for a win, 1 point for a draw, 0 points for a loss). If tied on points, tiebreakers are applied in the following order (Regulations Article 6.2):

1. Results in head-to-head matches between tied teams (points, goal difference, goals scored);
2. Goal difference in all matches;
3. Goals scored in all matches;
4. Red cards in all matches;
5. Yellow cards in all matches
6. Drawing of lots.

All times are local, PYST (UTC−3) until 24 March 2018, PYT (UTC−4) from 25 March 2018.

=== Group A ===
Pos	Team	Pld	W	D	L	GF	GA	GD	Pts	Qualification
1	Argentina	4	4	0	0	15	4	+11	12	Knockout stage
2	Colombia	4	2	1	1	12	7	+5	7	Knockout stage
3	Paraguay (H)	4	2	1	1	12	9	+3	7	Fifth place play-off
4	Bolivia	4	1	0	3	6	14	−8	3	Seventh place play-off
5	Ecuador	4	0	0	4	10	21	−11	0	Ninth place play-off

Source: CONMEBOL
(H) Hosts
22 March 2018
18:00

Argentina	3–2	Colombia
	Report

Centro de Entrenamiento Olímpico, Luque
22 March 2018
20:30

Paraguay	3–0	Bolivia
	Report

Centro de Entrenamiento Olímpico, Luque

23 March 2018
18:00

Bolivia	0–3	Colombia
	Report

Centro de Entrenamiento Olímpico, Luque
23 March 2018
20:00

Paraguay	5–3	Ecuador
	Report

Centro de Entrenamiento Olímpico, Luque

24 March 2018
18:00

Colombia	4–1	Ecuador
	Report

Centro de Entrenamiento Olímpico, Luque
24 March 2018
20:00

Argentina	3–0	Bolivia
	Report

Centro de Entrenamiento Olímpico, Luque

25 March 2018
18:00

Argentina	6–1	Ecuador
	Report

Centro de Entrenamiento Olímpico, Luque
25 March 2018
20:00

Paraguay	3–3	Colombia
	Report

Centro de Entrenamiento Olímpico, Luque

26 March 2018
18:00

Ecuador	5–6	Bolivia
	Report

Centro de Entrenamiento Olímpico, Luque
26 March 2018
20:00

Paraguay	1–3	Argentina
	Report

Centro de Entrenamiento Olímpico, Luque

=== Group B ===
Pos	Team	Pld	W	D	L	GF	GA	GD	Pts	Qualification
1	Brazil	4	3	0	1	40	7	+33	9 (Note: Head-to-head result: Brazil 8–1 Venezuela.)	Knockout stage
2	Venezuela	4	3	0	1	25	11	+14	9	Knockout stage
3	Uruguay (H)	4	2	1	1	11	12	−1	7	Fifth place play-off
4	Peru	4	1	1	2	22	17	+5	4	Seventh place play-off
5	Chile	4	0	0	4	0	51	−51	0	Ninth place play-off

Source: CONMEBOL
(H) Hosts
Notes:
22 March 2018
14:00

Venezuela	11–0	Chile
	Report

Centro de Entrenamiento Olímpico, Luque
22 March 2018
16:00

Brazil	2–3	Uruguay
	Report

Centro de Entrenamiento Olímpico, Luque

23 March 2018
14:00

Brazil	6–3	Peru
	Report

Centro de Entrenamiento Olímpico, Luque
23 March 2018
16:00

Uruguay	4–0	Chile
	Report

Centro de Entrenamiento Olímpico, Luque

24 March 2018
14:00

Venezuela	6–0	Uruguay
	Report

Centro de Entrenamiento Olímpico, Luque
24 March 2018
16:00

Peru	12–0	Chile
	Report

Centro de Entrenamiento Olímpico, Luque

25 March 2018
14:00

Brazil	24–0	Chile
	Report

Centro de Entrenamiento Olímpico, Luque
25 March 2018
16:00

Venezuela	7–3	Peru
	Report

Centro de Entrenamiento Olímpico, Luque

26 March 2018
14:00

Peru	4–4	Uruguay
	Report

Centro de Entrenamiento Olímpico, Luque
26 March 2018
16:00

Brazil	8–1	Venezuela
	Report

Centro de Entrenamiento Olímpico, Luque

== Knockout stage ==
In the semi-finals and final, extra time and penalty shoot-out are used to decide the winner if necessary.

=== Bracket ===
Semi-finals
28 November
Brazil (p)	2 (2)
Colombia	2 (0)
28 November
Argentina (a.e.t.)	4
Venezuela	2

Final
29 November
Brazil	3
Argentina	2
Third place
29 November
Colombia	5
Venezuela	3

Fifth place
27 November
Paraguay	5
Uruguay	4

Seventh place
27 November
Bolivia	4
Peru	6

Ninth place
27 November
Ecuador	5
Chile	1

=== Ninth place play-off ===
28 March 2018
09:00

Ecuador	5–1	Chile
	Report

Centro de Entrenamiento Olímpico, Luque

=== Seventh place play-off ===
28 March 2018
11:00

Bolivia	4–6	Peru
	Report

Centro de Entrenamiento Olímpico, Luque

=== Fifth place play-off ===
28 March 2018
14:00

Paraguay	5–4	Uruguay
	Report

Centro de Entrenamiento Olímpico, Luque

=== Semi-finals ===
28 March 2018
16:00

Brazil	2–2 (a.e.t.)	Colombia
	Report
Penalties
	2–0

Centro de Entrenamiento Olímpico, Luque
28 March 2018
18:00

Argentina	4–2 (a.e.t.)	Venezuela
	Report

Centro de Entrenamiento Olímpico, Luque

=== Third place play-off ===
29 March 2018
16:00

Colombia	5–3	Venezuela
	Report

Centro de Entrenamiento Olímpico, Luque

=== Final ===
Winner qualifies for 2018 Summer Youth Olympics boys' futsal tournament.

29 March 2018
18:00

Brazil	3–2	Argentina
	Report

Centro de Entrenamiento Olímpico, Luque

== Final ranking ==
Rank	Team
1st place, gold medalist(s)	Brazil
2nd place, silver medalist(s)	Argentina
3rd place, bronze medalist(s)	Colombia
4	Venezuela
5	Paraguay
6	Uruguay
7	Peru
8	Bolivia
9	Ecuador
10	Chile

== Qualified teams for Youth Olympics ==
The following two teams from CONMEBOL qualified for the 2018 Summer Youth Olympics boys' futsal tournament, including Argentina which qualified as hosts.

Team	Qualified on	Previous appearances in Youth Olympics
Argentina	4 July 2013	0 (debut)
Brazil	29 March 2018	0 (debut)

Notes

- Since teams from the same association cannot play in both the Youth Olympics boys' and girls' tournaments, if teams from the same association qualify for both tournaments, they must nominate their preferred qualification team, and the next best ranked team will qualify instead if one of the qualified teams are not nominated.
- As participation in team sports (Futsal, Beach handball, Field hockey, and Rugby sevens) are limited to one team per gender for each National Olympic Committee (NOC), the participating teams of the 2018 Youth Olympics futsal tournament will be confirmed by mid-2018 after each qualified NOC confirms their participation and any unused qualification places are reallocated.
