= South American U-17 Futsal Championship =

CONMEBOL Sub 17 Futsal
- Organizer(s): CONMEBOL
- Founded: 2016; 10 years ago
- Region: South America
- Teams: 10
- Related competitions: CONMEBOL Sub 20 Futsal
- Current champion(s): Argentina (3rd title)
- Most championships: Argentina (3 titles)
- Website: conmebol-sub-17-futsal
- 2024 CONMEBOL Sub 17 Futsal

The Sudamericano de Futsal Sub-17 (South American Under-17 Futsal Championship), branded as CONMEBOL Sub 17 Futsal, is an international futsal competition held every two years for South American under-17 men teams.

The second edition held in 2018 was an under-18 competition to decide the qualifiers for the 2018 Youth Olympic Futsal Tournament.

== Champions by year ==
Ed.	Years	Host city	(gold) Winners	(silver) Runners-up	(bronze) Third place	Fourth place
I	2016	(Brazil) Foz do Iguaçu	Brazil	Argentina	Venezuela	Peru
II	2018	(Paraguay) Luque	Brazil	Argentina	Colombia	Venezuela
III	2022	(Paraguay) Luque	Argentina	Brazil	Venezuela	Colombia
IV	2024	(Paraguay) Luque	Argentina	Brazil	Venezuela	Bolivia
V	2026	(Paraguay) Luque	Argentina	Brazil	Venezuela	Paraguay

== Performances by country ==
- Italic for the host nation.

Team	Titles	Runner-up	Third place	Fourth place
Argentina	3 (2022, 2024, 2026)	2 (2016, 2018)		
Brazil	2 (2016, 2018)	3 (2022, 2024, 2026)		
Venezuela			4 (2016, 2022, 2024, 2026)	1 (2018)
Colombia			1 (2018)	1 (2022)
Bolivia				1 (2024)
Peru				1 (2016)
Paraguay				1 (2026)
