= 2018 African Youth Olympic Futsal Qualifying Tournament =

Tournament details
- Dates: 14 January – 28 April 2018
- Teams: 8 (from 1 confederation)

Final positions
- Champions: Egypt (1st title)
- Runners-up: Angola

Tournament statistics
- Matches played: 8
- Goals scored: 50 (6.25 per match)

The 2018 African Youth Olympic Futsal Qualifying Tournament was an international youth futsal competition organised by the Confederation of African Football (CAF) as qualifying for the futsal tournament at the 2018 Summer Youth Olympics in Buenos Aires, to determine which under-18 national team from Africa qualify for the boys' tournament.

Players born on or after 1 January 2000 were eligible to compete in the tournament.

== Teams ==
A total of eight (out of 54) CAF member national teams entered the qualifying rounds.

- Angola
- **Egypt**
- Equatorial Guinea
- Ethiopia
- Morocco
- Mozambique
- Sudan
- Zambia

Notes

- Teams in **bold** qualified for the Olympics.

== Format ==
Qualification ties were played on a home-and-away two-legged basis. If the aggregate score was tied after the second leg, the away goals rule would be applied, and if still tied, the penalty shoot-out (no extra time) would be used to determine the winner.

== Schedule ==
The schedule of the qualifying rounds was as follows.

Round	Leg	Date
First round	First leg	12–14 January 2018
First round	Second leg	26–28 January 2018
Second round	First leg	23–25 February 2018
Second round	Second leg	9–11 March 2018
Third round	First leg	13–15 April 2018
Third round	Second leg	27–29 April 2018

== Bracket ==
The winner of the third round qualified for the 2018 Summer Youth Olympics boys' futsal tournament.

First round
**Morocco**	—	—	w/o
Equatorial Guinea	—	—
**Angola**	6	5	11
Zambia	3	1	4
Ethiopia	—	—
**Mozambique**	—	—	w/o
**Egypt**	—	—	w/o
Sudan	—	—

Second round
Morocco	3	1	4
**Angola**	3	2	5
Mozambique	3	0	3
**Egypt**	4	6	10

Third round
Angola	2	2	4
**Egypt**	6	3	9

== First round ==
Team 1	Agg.	Team 2	1st leg	2nd leg
Ethiopia	w/o	**Mozambique**	—	—
**Egypt**	w/o	Sudan	—	—
**Morocco**	w/o	Equatorial Guinea	—	—
**Angola**	11–4	Zambia	6–3	5–1

12 January 2018

Ethiopia	Cancelled	Mozambique
	Report

26 January 2018

Mozambique	Cancelled	Ethiopia
	Report

Mozambique won on walkover after Ethiopia withdrew.

12 January 2018

Egypt	Cancelled	Sudan
	Report

26 January 2018

Sudan	Cancelled	Egypt
	Report

Egypt won on walkover after Sudan withdrew.

12 January 2018

Morocco	Cancelled	Equatorial Guinea
	Report

26 January 2018

Equatorial Guinea	Cancelled	Morocco
	Report

Morocco won on walkover after Equatorial Guinea withdrew.

14 January 2018
09:00 UTC+1

Angola	6–3	Zambia
	Report

Pavilhão da Cidadela, Luanda
Referee: Abdoulkarim Magadji (Cameroon)
27 January 2018
15:00 UTC+2

Zambia	1–5	Angola
	Report

Olympic Youth Development Centre, Lusaka
Referee: Matendene Santos Mahumana (Mozambique)

Angola won 11–4 on aggregate.

== Second round ==
Team 1	Agg.	Team 2	1st leg	2nd leg
Mozambique	3–10	**Egypt**	3–4	0–6
Morocco	4–5	**Angola**	3–3	1–2

24 February 2018
18:00 UTC+2

Mozambique	3–4	Egypt
	Report

Pavilhão da Académica, Maputo
Referee: José Francisco Katemo Katchingavisa (Angola)
11 March 2018
18:00 UTC+2

Egypt	6–0	Mozambique
	Report

Cairo Stadium Indoor Halls Complex, Cairo
Referee: Mohamed Abid (Tunisia)

Egypt won 10–3 on aggregate.

25 February 2018
16:00 UTC+0

Morocco	3–3	Angola
	Report

Complexe Sportif Moulay Abdallah, Rabat
Referee: Adalbert Diouf (Senegal)
10 March 2018
16:00 UTC+1

Angola	2–1	Morocco
	Report

Pavilhão da Cidadela, Luanda
Referee: Ibrahim Fagge Umar (Nigeria)

Angola won 5–4 on aggregate.

== Third round ==
Winner qualified for 2018 Summer Youth Olympics boys' futsal tournament.

Team 1	Agg.	Team 2	1st leg	2nd leg
Angola	4–9	**Egypt**	2–6	2–3

14 April 2018
16:00 UTC+1

Angola	2–6	Egypt
	Report

Pavilhão da Cidadela, Luanda
Referee: Almoiz Ahmed Mohamed (Sudan)
28 April 2018
18:00 UTC+2

Egypt	3–2	Angola
	Report

Cairo Stadium Indoor Halls Complex, Cairo
Referee: Khalid Hnich (Morocco)

Egypt won 9–4 on aggregate.

== Qualified teams for Youth Olympics ==
The following team from CAF qualified for the 2018 Summer Youth Olympics boys' futsal tournament.

Team	Qualified on	Previous appearances in Youth Olympics
Egypt	28 April 2018	0 (debut)

Notes

- Since teams from the same association cannot play in both the Youth Olympics boys' and girls' tournaments, if teams from the same association qualify for both tournaments, they must nominate their preferred qualification team, and the runners-up will qualify instead if the winners are not nominated.
- As participation in team sports (Futsal, Beach handball, Field hockey, and Rugby sevens) are limited to one team per gender for each National Olympic Committee (NOC), the participating teams of the 2018 Youth Olympics futsal tournament will be confirmed by mid-2018 after each qualified NOC confirms their participation and any unused qualification places are reallocated.
