= Manvir Singh (footballer, born 2001) =

Indian footballer (born 2001)

Personal information
- Full name: Manvir Singh Saini
- Date of birth: June 15, 2001 (age 25)
- Place of birth: Nawanshahr, Punjab, India
- Height: 1.79 m (5 ft 10 in)
- Positions: Striker; right winger

Team information
- Current team: Inter Kashi
- Number: 9

Youth career
- –2018: Ozone

Senior career*
Years	Team	Apps	(Gls)
2018–2019	Ozone	8	(3)
2019–2020	Kerala Blasters	0	(0)
2019–2020	→ Indian Arrows (loan)	8	(0)
2020–2021	Sudeva Delhi	11	(1)
2021–2024	NorthEast United	14	(2)
2021–2022	→ Bengaluru (loan)	3	(3)
2022–2023	→ Delhi (loan)	11	(1)
2024–2025	Jamshedpur	1	(0)
2025	Mohammedan	10	(1)
2025–2026	Jamshedpur	6	(0)
2026–	Inter Kashi	2	(0)

International career^{‡}
2019	India U20	5	(2)
2025–	India	3	(0)
Medal record
Representing India
CAFA Nations Cup
Third place	2025 Tajikistan–Uzbekistan	Team
- * Club domestic league appearances and goals as of 17 October 2026 ‡ National team caps and goals as of 8 September 2025 (UTC)

Manvir Singh Saini (born 15 June 2001) is an Indian professional footballer who plays as a forward for Indian Super League club Inter Kashi.

== Club career ==
=== Sudeva Delhi ===
On 18 September 2020, Manvir signed contract with I-League at Sudeva Delhi.

=== NorthEast United ===
On 31 October 2021, Manvir joined Indian Super League club NorthEast United on a three-year deal.

=== Mohammedan ===
In 2024, Manvir joined Indian Super League club Mohammedan SC.

== International career ==
Manvir is also represented India national under-20 team which won the 2019 SAFF U-18 Championship in Bangladesh.

== Career statistics ==
=== Club ===
As of 10 March 2025

Club	Season	League			Cup		AFC		Total	
Club	Season	Division	Apps	Goals	Apps	Goals	Apps	Goals	Apps	Goals
Ozone	2018–19	I-League 2nd Division	8	3	0	0	–		8	3
Kerala Blasters	2019–20	Indian Super League	0	0	0	0	–		0	0
Indian Arrows (loan)	2019–20	I-League	8	0	0	0	–		8	0
Sudeva Delhi	2020–21	I-League	11	1	0	0	–		11	1
NorthEast United	2021–22	Indian Super League	5	0	0	0	–		5	0
NorthEast United	2023–24	Indian Super League	9	0	5 (Note: Appearance(s) in Durand Cup) (Note: Appearance(s) in Super Cup)	1	–		14	1
NorthEast United	Total		14	0	5	1	0	0	19	1
Delhi (loan)	2022–23	I-League 2nd Division	11	1	0	0	–		11	1
NorthEast United B	2024	RFDL	1	0	0	0	–		1	0
Jamshedpur	2024–25	Indian Super League	1	0	0	0	–		1	0
Mohammedan	2024–25	Indian Super League	10	1	0	0	–		10	1
Jamshedpur	2025–26	Indian Super League	0	0	0	0	–		0	0
Career total			64	6	5	1	0	0	69	7

=== International ===
As of 8 September 2025

National team	Year	Apps	Goals
India	2025	3	0
Total		3	0

== Honours ==
India U20

- OFC Youth Development Tournament: 2019
- SAFF U-20 Championship: 2019

Ozone FC

- 2017–18 Youth League U18 Top scorer
