= Villa Martelli =

- District
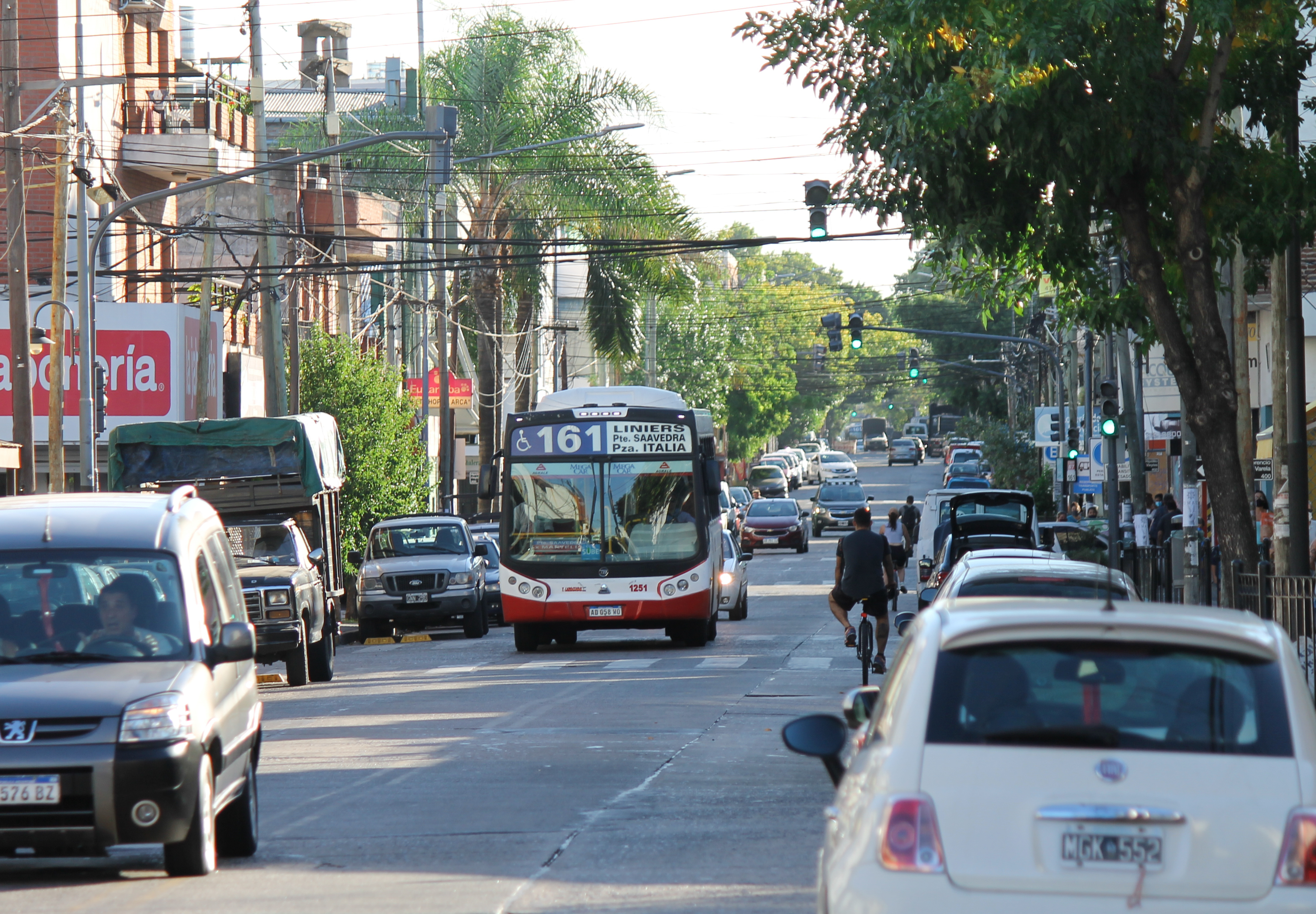
- Laprida Avenue, Villa Martelli.

- Location in Greater Buenos Aires
- Coordinates: 34°33′S 58°30.5′W
- Country: Argentina
- Province: Buenos Aires
- Partido: Vicente López
- Founded: 6 May 1910; 116 years ago
- Elevation: 22 m (72 ft)

Population (2001 census [INDEC])
  - Total: 26,059
- CPA Base: B 1603
- Area code: +54 11

Villa Martelli is a town in the Partido of Vicente Lopez, in the Greater Buenos Aires metro area.

== History ==
The first recorded settlement in the area occurred on May 6, 1910, and the town was officially recognized by the Provincial Legislature on July 27, 1964. The Villa Martelli Army Barracks were the site of a military mutiny in 1988 by a right-wing Carapintadas faction led by Col. Mohamed Alí Seineldín. The barracks were later closed, and in 2011, a portion of the extensive lot became the site of the Tecnópolis exposition fairground.
