= OFC Youth Development Tournament =

Youth football championship

The OFC Youth Development Tournament is an international youth football championship organised by the Oceania Football Confederation (OFC).

== Youth Development Tournament ==
In the first edition of the Youth Development Tournament in 2019, a total of six men's under-18 national teams, including four from Oceania and two from outside Oceania (one from Asia and one from Europe), were invited to participate in the cross-confederation event.

For 2021, a U-18 men's tournament and a U-15 boys' tournament are tentatively scheduled between September and December.

A women's tournament was originally scheduled for May 2020, but was cancelled due to the COVID-19 pandemic. For 2022, a U-18 women's tournament was tentatively scheduled in April, and a U-15 girls' tournament was tentatively scheduled between September and December, but both were cancelled as those players will now be eligible for the 2022 OFC U-20 Women's Championship and 2022 OFC U-17 Women's Championship, which were postponed from 2021.

=== Men's U-18 ===
Year	Host	Final			Third Place			Number of teams
Year	Host	Winner	Score	Runner-up	Third Place	Score	Fourth Place	Number of teams
2019; Details	Vanuatu	India	2–0	Tahiti	Estonia	1–0	New Caledonia	6

=== Men's U-15 ===
Year	Host	Final			Third Place			Number of teams
Year	Host	Winner	Score	Runner-up	Third Place	Score	Fourth Place	Number of teams
2023; Details	New Zealand	Tahiti	Round-robin	Fiji	Solomon Islands	Round-robin	Liechtenstein	7
2025; Details	New Zealand	Solomon Islands	1-0	Cook Islands	Tahiti	2-1	Tonga	9
2026; Details	New Zealand	Tahiti	Round-robin	Samoa	Fiji	Round-robin	New Caledonia	6

=== Women's U-15 ===
Year	Host	Final			Third Place			Number of teams
Year	Host	Winner	Score	Runner-up	Third Place	Score	Fourth Place	Number of teams
2024; Details	Fiji	New Caledonia	3-0	Fiji	Papua New Guinea		Solomon Islands	8
2026; Details	Fiji	New Zealand	12-0	Samoa	New Caledonia	1-0	Tahiti	8

== Youth Futsal Tournament ==
The OFC Youth Futsal Tournament was held for the first time in 2017 to find representatives to attend the futsal tournament at the 2018 Summer Youth Olympics in Buenos Aires, Argentina. OFC intends to hold a tournament every two years, but the next edition has been postponed due to the COVID-19 pandemic. The 2022 edition, scheduled to take place between 22–25 September 2022, was also cancelled due to congestion in the football calendar.

=== Men's ===
Year	Host	Final			Third Place			Number of teams
Year	Host	Winner	Score	Runner-up	Third Place	Score	Fourth Place	Number of teams
2017; Details	New Zealand	Solomon Islands	Round-robin	New Zealand	Vanuatu	Round-robin	New Caledonia	7

=== Women's ===
Year	Host	Final			Third Place			Number of teams
Year	Host	Winner	Score	Runner-up	Third Place	Score	Fourth Place	Number of teams
2017; Details	New Zealand	New Zealand	Round-robin	Tonga	Samoa	Round-robin	(New Zealand); Auckland Football Federation	4

== Youth Champions League ==
The inaugural OFC Youth Champions League was scheduled to take place between 16–31 January 2021, but was cancelled due to the COVID-19 pandemic. The 2022 edition, scheduled to take place between 15–30 January 2022, was also cancelled due to congestion in the football calendar.
