= Tecnópolis =

Science and art exhibition in Argentina

Tecnopolis
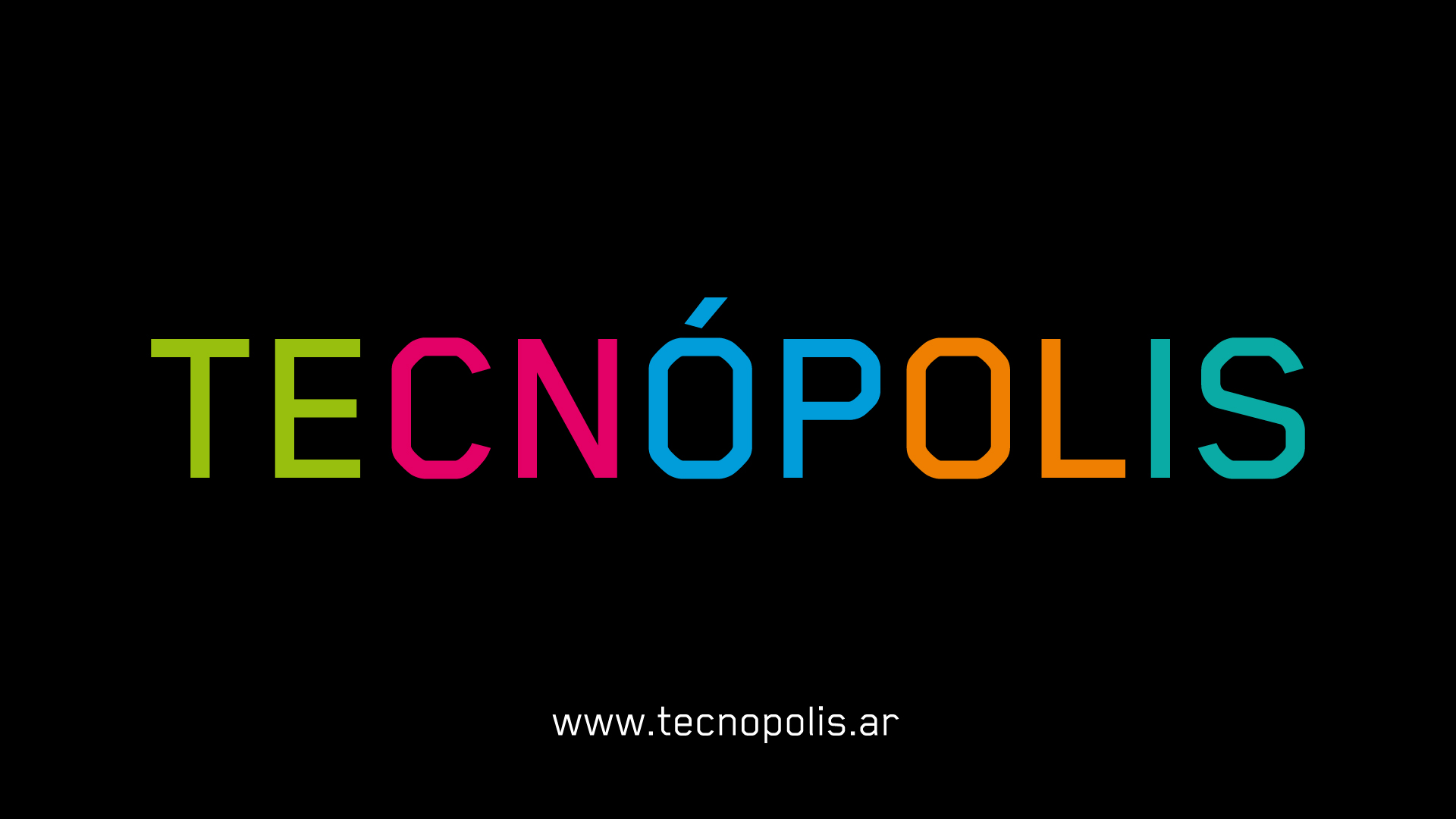
- Technopolis Logo
- Status: Active
- Genre: Exhibition of science, technology, industry and art
- Venue: 34°33′31″S 58°30′41″W
- Locations: Villa Martelli, Province of Buenos Aires
- Country: Argentina
- Inaugurated: 2011
- Website: www.tecnopolis.gob.ar

Technopolis (Spanish Tecnópolis) is a science, technology, industry and arts exhibition center located in Villa Martelli, Vicente Lopez division, Greater Buenos Aires, Argentina. It is the largest of its kind in the country. It was inaugurated on July 14, 2011, by President Cristina Fernández de Kirchner.

== History ==
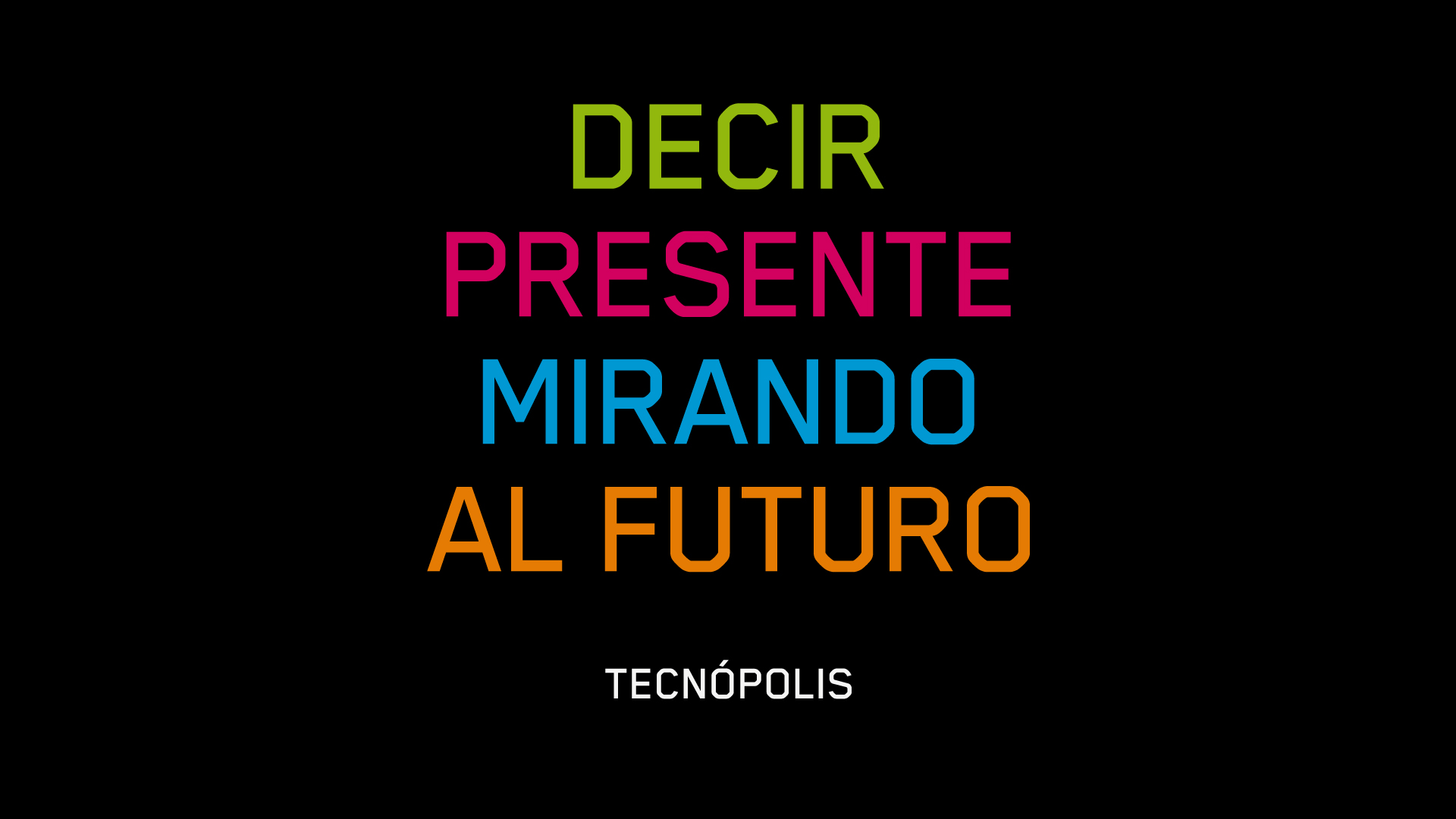
Say present (the word "presente" means "here" and "present" at the same time in this sentence), looking at the future Technopolis slogan

Initially, Technopolis was scheduled to be held in Buenos Aires after the Argentina Bicentennial celebrations.

The mega exhibition was planned to be the end of the Bicentennial celebrations organized by the national government in 2010, and inaugurated on November 19, 2010, in Buenos Aires for the "Day of Sovereignty", the anniversary of the Battle of Vuelta de Obligado, in the area of parks of the Avenida Figueroa Alcorta. However, in October 2010, the Chief of Government of Buenos Aires, Mauricio Macri, denied authorization in such plots as the transport system would collapse in the city.

Thus, the national government decided to relocate the mega exhibition in an area of fifty hectares in the Province of Buenos Aires, located in Villa Martelli, Vicente López, at the former barracks of Army Battalion 601.

== Continents (2011 edition) ==
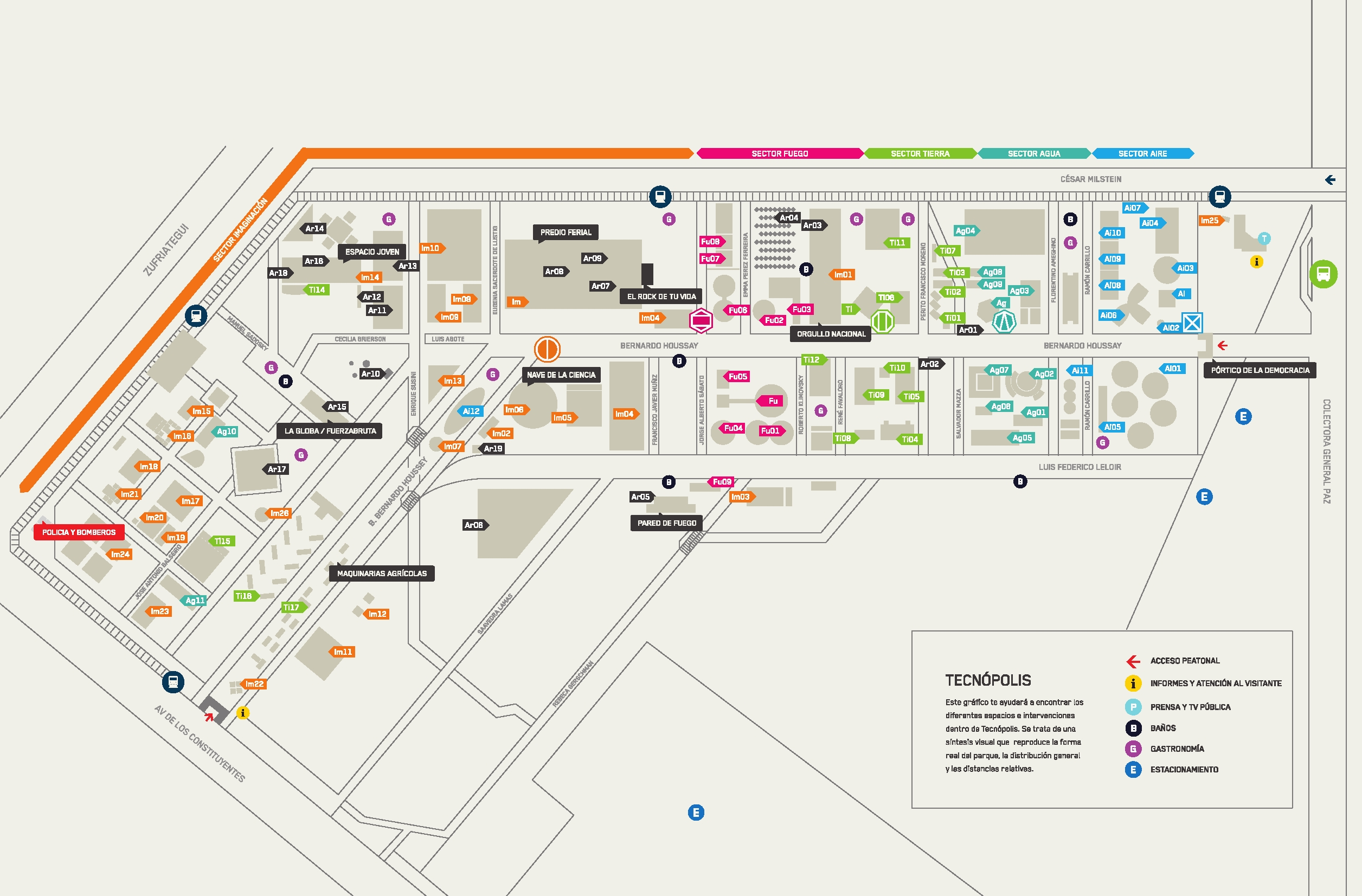
Technopolis map

The exhibition has over 100 stands that are organized in five continents: Water, Earth, Air, Fire and Imagination. These take the visitors to different aspects and practices of the past, present and future Argentinean scientist. To make this historical review educational, there is a timeline with milestones expressed in posters of local achievements in the world of science.

The exhibit also features discussions and scientific presentations to the public in general, some of the scientists involved are Vicente Barros, Nora Sabelli, Gonzalo Zabala, Alberto Saal, Sebastian Kadena, Roberto Etchenique, Lino Barañao, Ariel Arbiser, among others.

One mile of track was installed on the property, providing access to a train that runs the exhibition from one extreme to another. The rolling stock in use on the line is a railbus manufactured by the Argentine company TecnoTren. It has the same body of a bus, is lightweight, requires special way, and uses an automatic gearbox and diesel engine. Currently, this model is used in various parts of the country as a regular service.

== Arena ==
Tecnópolis hosts an indoor multipurpose venue for 30,000 people that has been used mostly for concerts and sport events. Some of the artists that have performed in this venue are Blur, Gorillaz, Lana Del Rey, Beck, Travis, Imagine Dragons, Juana Molina, Attaque 77, Evanescence, Linkin Park, and Catupecu Machu, Soy Luna, and Violetta. It has also hosted the 2015 Davis Cup World Group quarterfinal between Argentina and Serbia, the 2016 Pan American Men's Handball Championship, the opening ceremony of the 2013 Youth Parapan American Games and the futsal competitions at the 2018 Summer Youth Olympics.

== Events ==
It was one of the main venues of the 2018 Summer Youth Olympics and was supposed to be the site for the cancelled Expo 2023.

During October and November 2025, Argentine singer Tini held her own music festival, "Futttura", at Tecnópolis. The event consisted of multiple shows lasting over three hours and featured various guest artists, including Chris Martin and María Becerra. The festival ran from 25 October to 16 November 2025 and marked one of the most ambitious projects of her career.

== Gallery ==
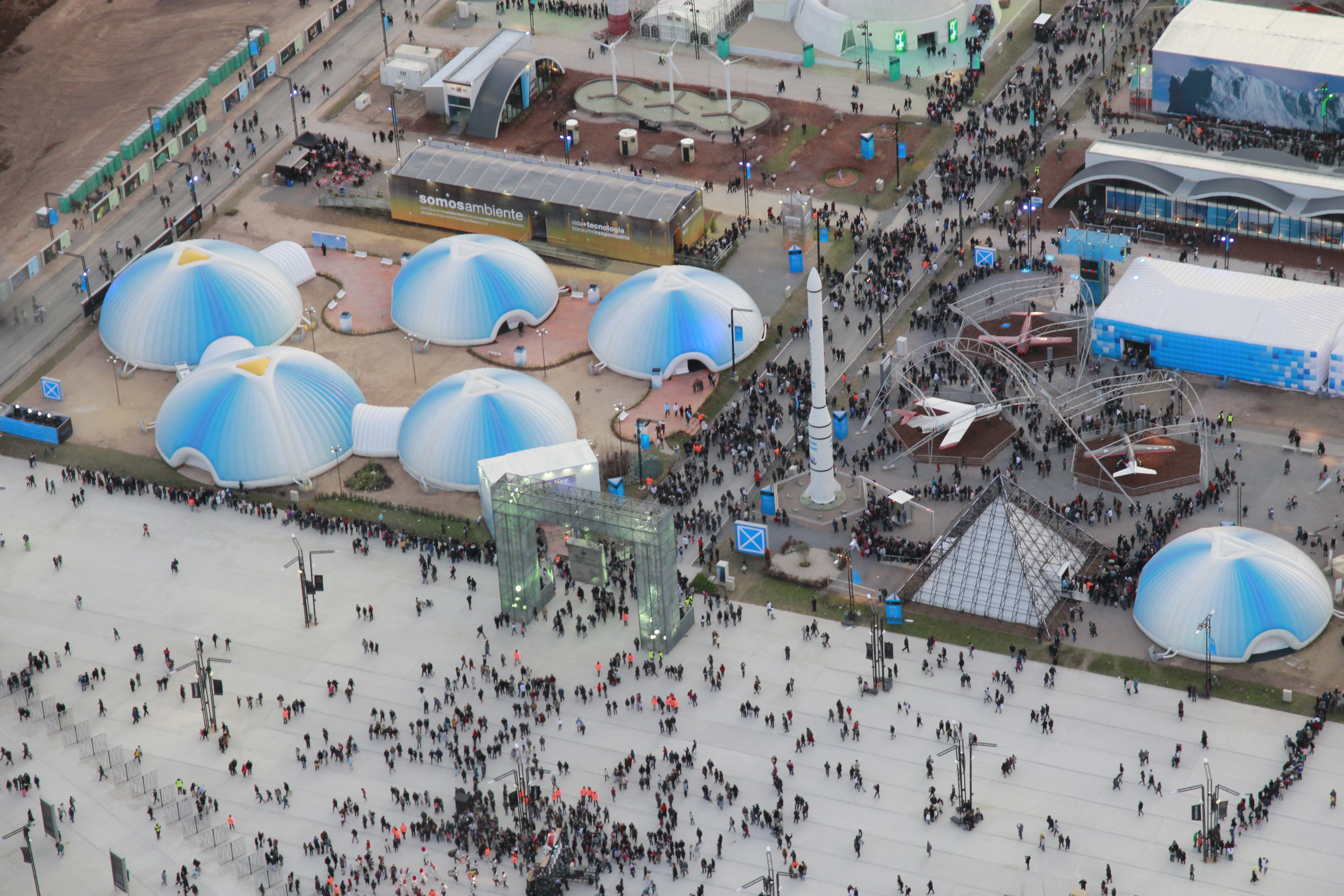
Part of the exhibition grounds seen from above

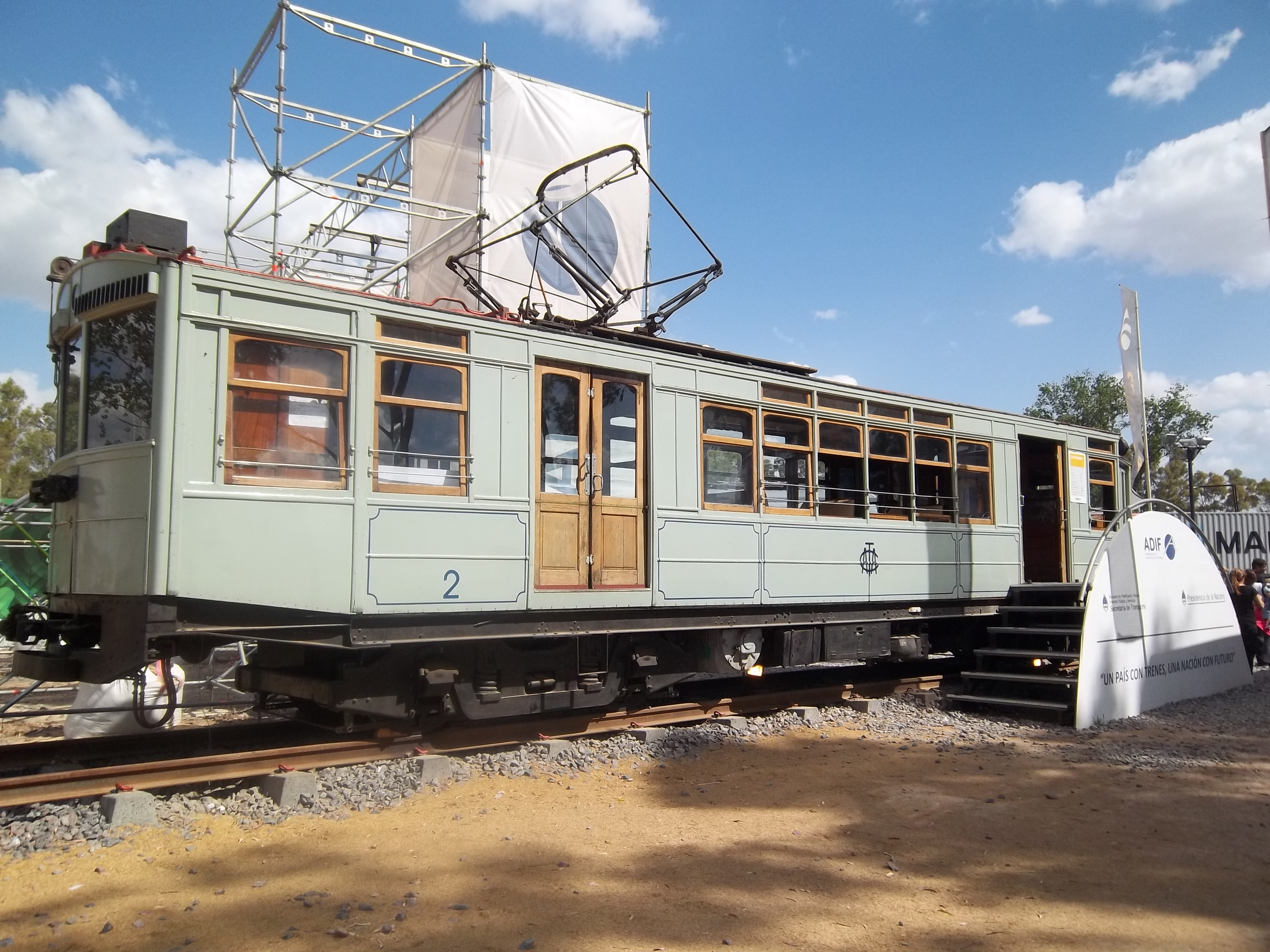
A UEC Preston car which served on the Buenos Aires Underground

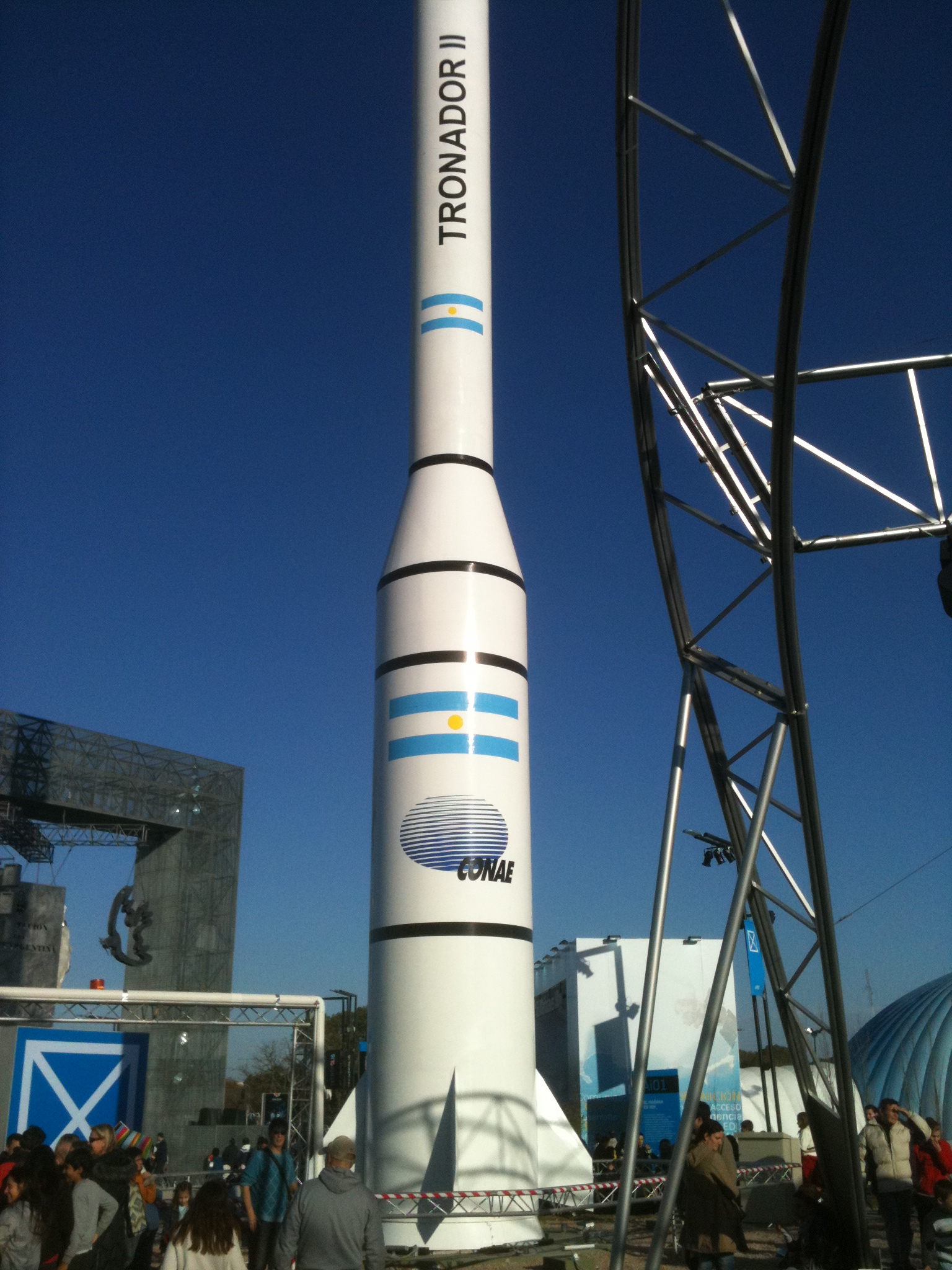
Tronador II rocket

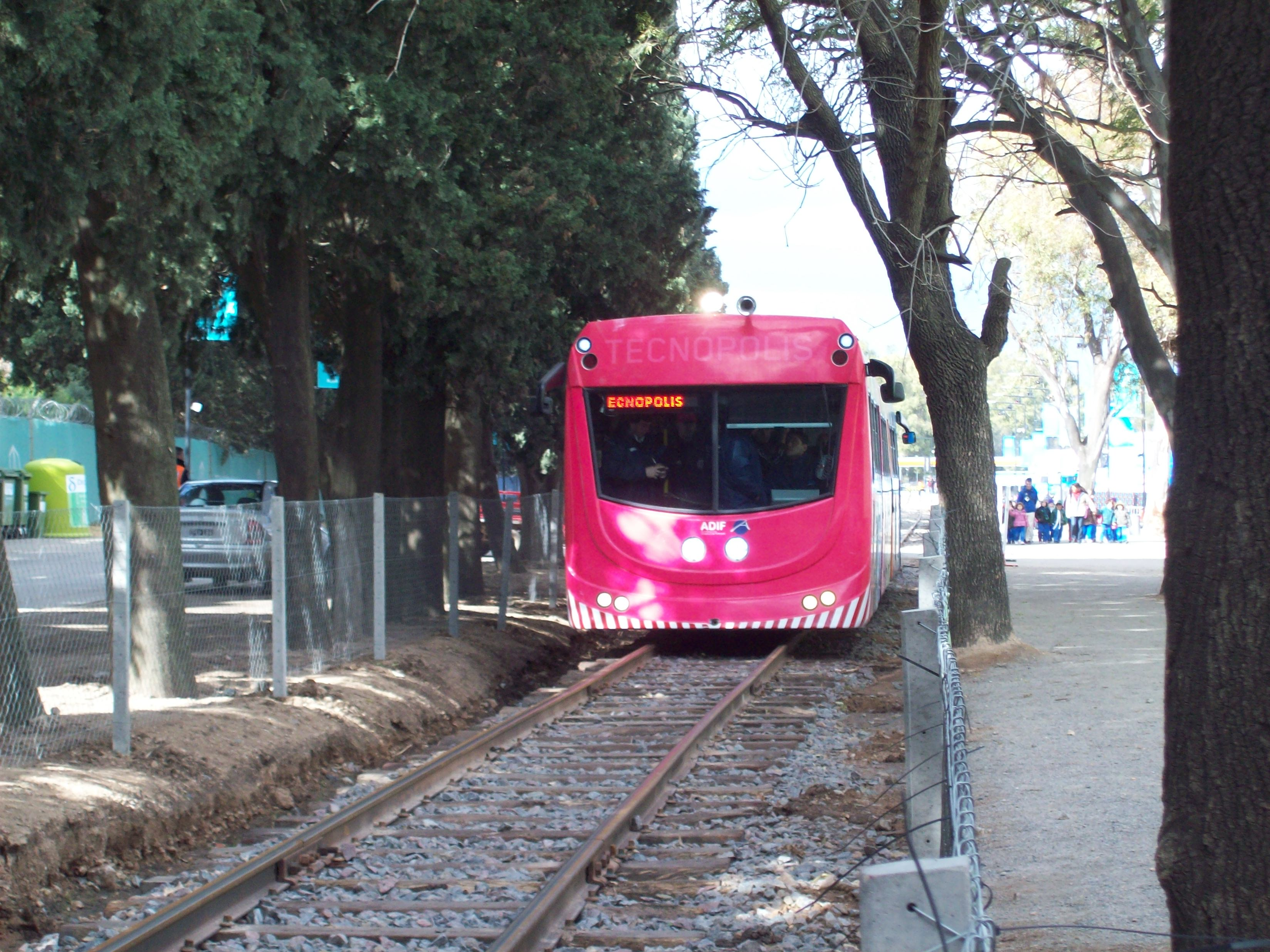
A TecnoTren railbus

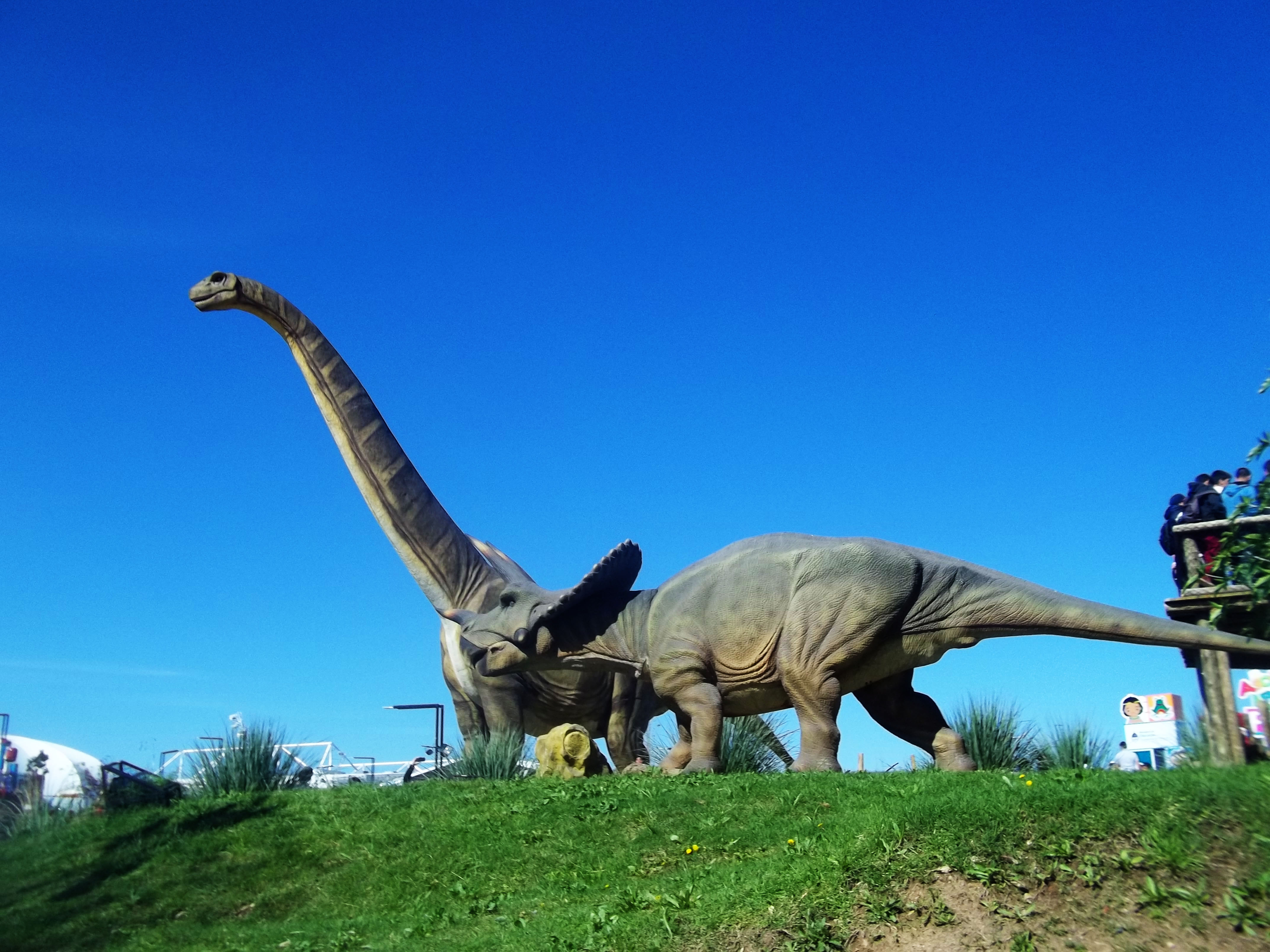
Dinosaur exhibit
