= 2019 OFC Youth Development Tournament =

Tournament details
- Host country: Vanuatu
- Dates: 15–24 August 2019
- Teams: 6 (from 3 confederations)
- Venue: 1 (in 1 host city)

Final positions
- Champions: India (1st title)
- Runners-up: Tahiti
- Third place: Estonia
- Fourth place: New Caledonia

Tournament statistics
- Matches played: 9
- Goals scored: 19 (2.11 per match)
- Attendance: 10,700 (1,189 per match)
- Top scorer: (India) Vikram Pratap Singh (2 goals)

The 2019 OFC Youth Development Tournament was the 1st edition of the OFC Youth Development Tournament, an international youth football championship organised by the Oceania Football Confederation (OFC). The tournament was held in Vanuatu between 15 and 24 August 2019.

== Teams ==
A total of six men's under-18 national teams, including four from Oceania and two from outside Oceania (one from Asia and one from Europe), were invited to participate in the cross-confederation event.

- Estonia (from UEFA)
- India (from AFC)
- New Caledonia
- Papua New Guinea
- Tahiti
- Vanuatu (hosts)

== Venues ==
The tournament was played at the Korman Stadium in Port Vila, Vanuatu

== Squads ==
Players born on or after 1 January 2001 were eligible to compete in the tournament. Each team can name a maximum of 20 players.

== Group stage ==
The teams were divided into two groups of three teams, including two from OFC and one from outside OFC.

Key to colours in group tables
Group winners advance to the Final
Group runners-up advance to the Third place match
Group third place advance to the Fifth place match

Times listed are UTC+11:00.

=== Group A ===
Pos	Team	Pld	W	D	L	GF	GA	GD	Pts	Qualification
1	Tahiti	2	2	0	0	3	1	+2	6	Final
2	Estonia	2	1	0	1	1	2	−1	3	Third place match
3	Papua New Guinea	2	0	0	2	2	3	−1	0	Fifth place match

Source: OFC
15 August 2019
14:00

Tahiti	2–1	Papua New Guinea
Labaste 45'; Chung 59'	Report	Wadunah 37'

Korman Stadium, Port Vila
Attendance: 800
Referee: Veer Singh (Fiji)

18 August 2019
14:00

Papua New Guinea	1–1	Estonia
Rani 21'	Report	Iljin 90'
Penalties
	4–5

Korman Stadium, Port Vila
Attendance: 800
Referee: Ben Aukwai (Solomon Islands)

21 August 2019
14:00

Estonia	0–1	Tahiti
	Report	Holozet 78' (pen.)

Korman Stadium, Port Vila
Attendance: 800
Referee: Veer Singh (Fiji)

=== Group B ===
Pos	Team	Pld	W	D	L	GF	GA	GD	Pts	Qualification
1	India	2	2	0	0	5	1	+4	6	Final
2	New Caledonia	2	1	0	1	4	5	−1	3	Third place match
3	Vanuatu (H)	2	0	0	2	1	4	−3	0	Fifth place match

Source: OFC
(H) Hosts
15 August 2019
17:00

New Caledonia	3–1	Vanuatu
Watrone 17'; Pougin 47'; Hnaweo 90'	Report	Ravo 90'

Korman Stadium, Port Vila
Attendance: 1,500
Referee: Sione Lelenga (Tonga)

18 August 2019
17:00

Vanuatu	0–1	India
	Report	Ravo 79' (o.g.)

Korman Stadium, Port Vila
Attendance: 3,000
Referee: Roger Adams (Papua New Guinea)

21 August 2019
17:00

India	4–1	New Caledonia
V. Singh 17'; Chetri 41'; Shabong 74'; G. Singh 79' (pen.)	Report	Waya 83' (pen.)

Korman Stadium, Port Vila
Attendance: 1,500
Referee: Rani Perry (Tahiti)

== Placement matches ==
=== Fifth place match ===
24 August 2019
11:00

Papua New Guinea	0–0	Vanuatu
	Report
Penalties
	2–3

Korman Stadium, Port Vila
Attendance: 300
Referee: Sione Mau (American Samoa)

=== Third place match ===
24 August 2019
14:00

Estonia	1–0	New Caledonia
Luts 90'	Report

Korman Stadium, Port Vila
Attendance: 500
Referee: Ben Aukwai (Solomon Islands)

=== Final ===
24 August 2019
17:00

Tahiti	0–2	India
	Report	M. Singh 71'; V. Singh 88'

Korman Stadium, Port Vila
Attendance: 1,500
Referee: Sione Lelenga (Tonga)

== Goalscorers ==
There were 19 goals scored in 9 matches, for an average of 2.11 goals per match.

2 goals

- (India) Vikram Pratap Singh

1 goal

- (Estonia) Aleksander Iljin
- (Estonia) Joonas Luts
- (India) Aman Chetri
- (India) Ricky Shabong
- (India) Gurkirat Singh
- (India) Manvir Singh Jr
- (New Caledonia) Alan Hnaweo
- (New Caledonia) Luc Pougin
- (New Caledonia) Jacques Watrone
- (New Caledonia) Lues Waya
- (Papua New Guinea) Solomon Rani
- (Papua New Guinea) Jason Wadunah
- (French Polynesia) Tonitini Chung
- (French Polynesia) Tehauarii Holozet
- (French Polynesia) Ariiura Labaste
- (Vanuatu) Armando Ravo

1 own goal

- (Vanuatu) Armando Ravo (against India)
