= Futsal at the 2018 Summer Youth Olympics =

Futsal at the III Summer Youth Olympic Games
- Pictogram for futsal
- Venue: 2 (in two host cities)
- Dates: 7–18 October 2018
- No. of events: 2 (1 boys, 1 girls)
- Competitors: 200 (100 boys + 100 girls) from 20 (10 boys + 10 girls) nations

The futsal competition at the 2018 Summer Youth Olympics was held from 7 to 18 October. At Tecnópolis and the CeNARD, the first one located in Villa Martelli, and the second one in Buenos Aires. There are two tournaments, one for boys and one for girls.

== Venues ==
- Tecnópolis – Villa Martelli, Buenos Aires Province
- CeNARD – Núñez, Buenos Aires

== Qualification ==
Each National Olympic Committee (NOC) is limited to participation in 1 team sports (Futsal, Beach handball, Field Hockey, and Rugby Sevens) per each gender with the exception of the host country who can enter one team per sport. Also at Futsal each NOC can enter a maximum of 1 team of 10 athletes per both genders. To be eligible to participate in the Youth Olympics, athletes must have been born between 1 January 2000 and 31 December 2003.

As hosts, Argentina has the right to directly qualify 1 team (male or female of their own choice, but not both) on account of CONMEBOL quota. The best ranked NOC in each of the 6 Continental Qualification Tournaments will obtain quota place. 2 quota per each gender are giving to AFC, UEFA, CONCACAF and CONMEBOL and 1 quota per each gender are giving to CAF and OFC.

If for a particular Confederation there is no qualification Tournament or the tournament is not confirmed by 31 December 2017, the best ranked NOC from the respective Confederation at the 2016 FIFA Futsal World Cup will obtain quota place for the boys tournament and the best ranked NOC from the respective Confederation from a senior Futsal tournament will be obtain quota place for the girls tournament. Should there be no teams remaining from the respective Confederation, the FIFA Ranking of 15 May 2018 will be used to determine the next best ranked NOC not yet qualified that will obtain quota place.

=== Boys' qualification ===
Host nation Argentina chose to compete in boys' tournament. In addition, 9 other national under-18 teams qualified from six separate continental confederations.

Event	Dates	Location	Quota Place	Qualified
Host country	-	-	1	Argentina
2016 FIFA Futsal World Cup (CONCACAF)	10 September–1 October 2016	Colombia	2	Costa Rica; Panama
2017 AFC U-20 Futsal Championship	16–26 May 2017	Thailand	2	Iran; Iraq
2017 OFC Youth Futsal Tournament	4–7 October 2017	New Zealand	1	Solomon Islands
2017 UEFA Youth Olympic Futsal Qualifying Tournament	1–4 November 2017	Serbia; Slovakia; Croatia; Slovenia	2	Russia; Slovakia^{A}
2018 South American Under-18 Futsal Championship	22–29 March 2018	Paraguay	1	Brazil
2018 African Youth Olympic Futsal Qualifying Tournament	12 January – 29 April 2018	Various	1	Egypt
Total			10	

^A Italy originally qualified, but chose to compete in beach handball. The spot was reallocated to the next highest ranked nation, Slovakia.

=== Girls' qualification ===
Since host nation Argentina chose to compete in boys' tournament, 10 national under-18 teams qualified from six separate continental confederations.

Event	Dates	Location	Quota Place	Qualified
2017 OFC Youth Futsal Tournament	4–7 October 2017	New Zealand	1	Tonga^{B}
2017 UEFA Youth Olympic Futsal Qualifying Tournament	1–4 November 2017	Portugal; Spain	2	Portugal; Spain
2017 Copa América Femenina de Futsal	22–29 November 2017	Uruguay	2	Bolivia^{C} Chile^{C}
FIFA Women's World Rankings (CAF)	23 March 2018	–	1	Cameroon^{D}
FIFA Women's World Rankings (CONCACAF)	23 March 2018	–	2	Trinidad and Tobago^{E} Dominican Republic^{E}
2018 AFC Women's Futsal Championship	2–12 May 2018	Thailand	2	Japan; Thailand^{F}
Total			10	

^B New Zealand originally qualified, but chose to compete in rugby sevens. The spot was reallocated to the next highest ranked nation, Tonga.
^C Brazil and Colombia originally qualified, but Brazil chose to compete in boys' tournament and Colombia chose to compete in rugby sevens. The spots were eventually reallocated to Bolivia and Chile.
^D Nigeria originally qualified, but declined to enter. The spot was eventually reallocated to Cameroon.
^E United States and Canada originally qualified, but United States declined to enter and Canada chose to compete in rugby sevens. The spots were eventually reallocated to Trinidad and Tobago and Dominican Republic.
^F Iran originally qualified, but chose to compete in boys' tournament. The spot was reallocated to the next highest ranked nation, Thailand.

== Schedule ==
The girls' tournament will take place between 7–17 October 2018, and the boys' tournament will take place between 7–18 October 2018.

All times are local, ART (UTC−3).

Event date	Event day	Starting time	Event details
October 7	Sunday	14:00	Girls' Group Stage
October 7	Sunday	18:00	Boys' Group Stage
October 8	Monday	14:00	Girls' Group Stage
October 8	Monday	18:00	Boys' Group Stage
October 9	Tuesday	14:00	Girls' Group Stage
October 9	Tuesday	18:00	Boys' Group Stage
October 10	Wednesday	14:00	Girls' Group Stage
October 10	Wednesday	18:00	Boys' Group Stage
October 11	Thursday	14:00	Girls' Group Stage
October 11	Thursday	18:00	Boys' Group Stage
October 12	Friday	14:00	Girls' Group Stage
October 12	Friday	18:00	Boys' Group Stage
October 13	Saturday	14:00	Girls' Group Stage
October 13	Saturday	18:00	Boys' Group Stage
October 15	Monday	14:00	Girls' Semifinals
October 15	Monday	18:00	Boys' Semifinals
October 17	Wednesday	15:30	Girls' Medal Matches
October 18	Thursday	10:30	Boys' Medal Matches

== Draw ==
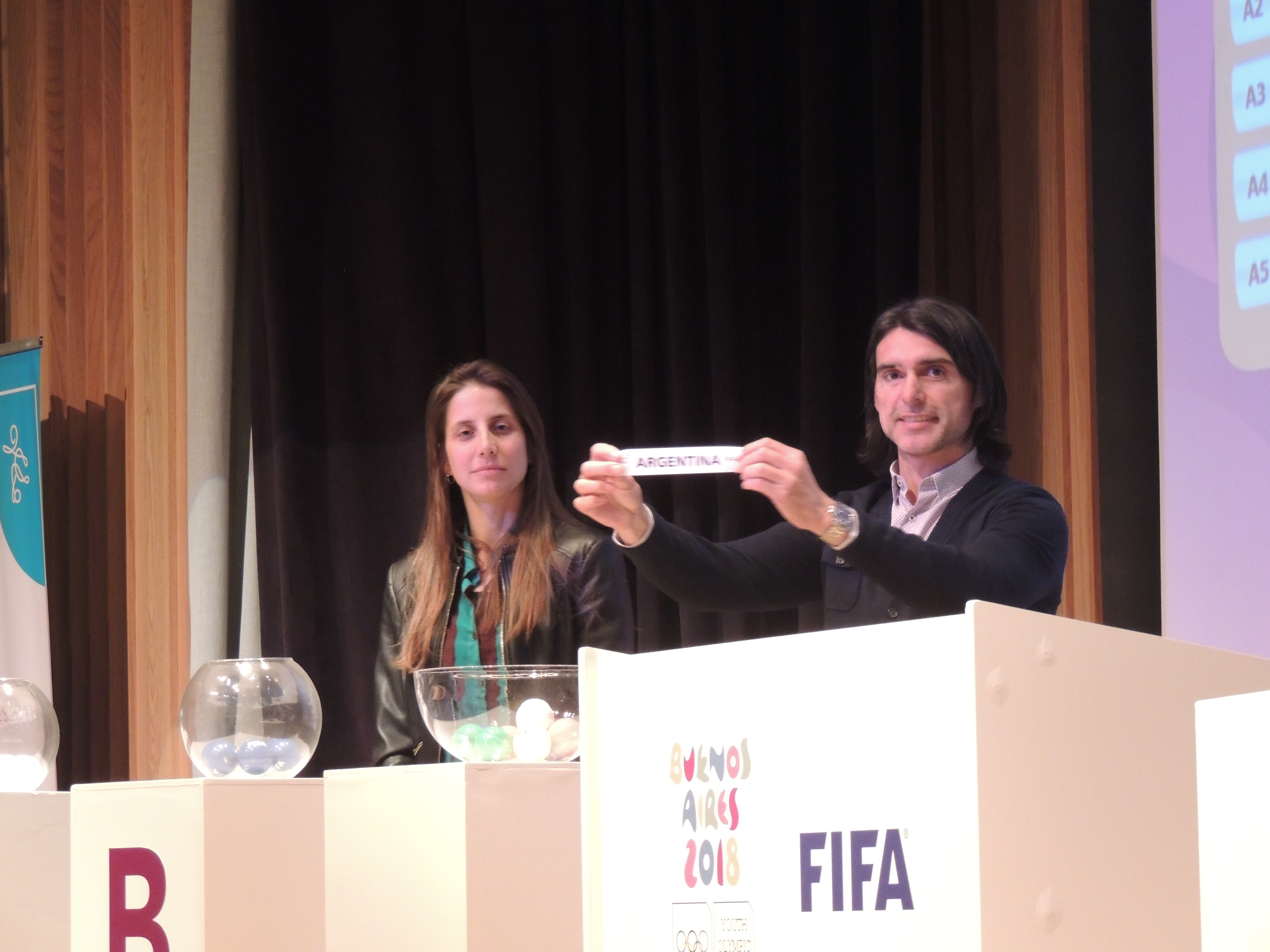
Roberto Ayala announces the position of Argentina during the draw.

The draw was held on 24 August 2018, 18:30 ART (UTC−3), at the Casa de Gobierno de la Ciudad de Buenos Aires in Buenos Aires. In both the boys' and girls' tournament, the ten teams were drawn into two groups of five teams. The hosts Argentina were assigned to position A1 in the boys' tournament. As teams from the same confederation could not be drawn into the same group, the two teams each from AFC (Asia), CONCACAF (North America), CONMEBOL (South America), and UEFA (Europe) were drawn into different groups, and as a result the two remaining teams, one each from CAF (Africa) and OFC (Oceania), were also drawn into different groups.

== Match officials ==
A total of 24 officials (18 men and 6 women) were appointed by FIFA for the two tournaments.

Confederation	Referees
AFC	(Bahrain) Hussain Ali Al Bahhar
AFC	(Japan) Hiroyuki Kobayashi
AFC	(Chinese Taipei) Po Fu Lee
AFC	(China) Qingyun Liang
AFC	(Iran) Gelareh Nazemi Deylami
CAF	(Egypt) Mohamed Hassan Hassan Ahmed Youssef
CAF	(Morocco) Khalid Hnich
CONCACAF	(El Salvador) Jose Misael Barrera Masferrer
CONCACAF	(Costa Rica) Diego Molina Lopez
CONCACAF	(Cuba) Roberto Sanchez
CONCACAF	(United States) Lance Vanhaitsma

Confederation	Referees
CONMEBOL	(Brazil) Ricardo Amaral Messa
CONMEBOL	(Venezuela) Tayana Raquel Moreno Sarabia
CONMEBOL	(Chile) Valeria Nicole Palma Palma
CONMEBOL	(Argentina) Andres Daniel Peña Garcia
CONMEBOL	(Paraguay) Bill Rafael Herminio Villalba Vera
CONMEBOL	(Argentina) Leandro Lorenzo (support)
OFC	(New Zealand) Antony Riley
UEFA	(France) Victor Berg Audic
UEFA	(Romania) Ovidiu Dan Curta
UEFA	(Croatia) Nikola Jelić
UEFA	(Portugal) Miguel Duarte Oliveira Castilho
UEFA	(Italy) Chiara Perona
UEFA	(Spain) David Urdanoz Apezteguia
UEFA	(Russia) Irina Velikanova

== Squads ==
Each team had to name a preliminary squad of 20 players (minimum three must be goalkeepers). From the preliminary squad, the team had to name a final squad of 10 players (minimum two must be goalkeepers) by the FIFA deadline.

== Format ==
The top two teams of each group advance to the semi-finals. The rankings of teams in each group are determined as follows (regulations Article 15.5):

1. points obtained in all group matches;
2. goal difference in all group matches;
3. number of goals scored in all group matches;

If two or more teams are equal on the basis of the above three criteria, their rankings are determined as follows:

4. points obtained in the group matches between the teams concerned;
5. goal difference in the group matches between the teams concerned;
6. number of goals scored in the group matches between the teams concerned;
7. fair play points in all group matches:
  - first yellow card: minus 1 point;
  - indirect red card (second yellow card): minus 3 points;
  - direct red card: minus 4 points;
  - yellow card and direct red card: minus 5 points;
8. drawing of lots by the FIFA Organising Committee.

In the semi-finals, bronze medal match and goal medal match, if a match is level at the end of normal playing time, extra time will be played (two periods of five minutes each) and followed, if necessary, by a penalty shoot-out to determine the winner.

== Boys' tournament ==
Pos	Team	Pld	W	D	L	GF	GA	GD	Pts
1st place, gold medalist(s)	Brazil	6	6	0	0	32	7	+25	18
2nd place, silver medalist(s)	Russia	6	4	0	2	23	17	+6	12
3rd place, bronze medalist(s)	Egypt	6	4	1	1	21	15	+6	13
4	Argentina (H)	6	2	1	3	25	16	+9	7
5	Iraq	4	2	1	1	12	5	+7	7
6	Iran	4	2	0	2	19	11	+8	6
7	Slovakia	4	1	0	3	5	12	−7	3
8	Costa Rica	4	1	0	3	17	27	−10	3
9	Panama	4	0	1	3	7	25	−18	1
10	Solomon Islands	4	0	0	4	13	39	−26	0

Source: IOC
Rules for classification: (5th to 10th place) 1) points; 2) goal difference; 3) goals scored; 4) equal ranking if still tied (regulations Article 15.6).
(H) Hosts

== Girls' tournament ==
Pos	Team	Pld	W	D	L	GF	GA	GD	Pts
1st place, gold medalist(s)	Portugal	6	6	0	0	57	5	+52	18
2nd place, silver medalist(s)	Japan	6	4	0	2	20	13	+7	12
3rd place, bronze medalist(s)	Spain	6	5	0	1	52	8	+44	15
4	Bolivia	6	3	0	3	22	44	−22	9
5	Thailand	4	2	0	2	29	13	+16	6
6	Cameroon	4	2	0	2	16	13	+3	6
7	Trinidad and Tobago	4	1	0	3	10	40	−30	3
8	Chile	4	0	1	3	6	27	−21	1
9	Dominican Republic	4	0	1	3	6	32	−26	1
10	Tonga	4	0	0	4	8	31	−23	0

Source: IOC
Rules for classification: (5th to 10th place) 1) points; 2) goal difference; 3) goals scored; 4) equal ranking if still tied (regulations Article 15.6).

== Medal summary ==
=== Medal table ===
Rank	Nation	Gold	Silver	Bronze	Total
1	Brazil	1	0	0	1
1	Portugal	1	0	0	1
3	Japan	0	1	0	1
3	Russia	0	1	0	1
5	Egypt	0	0	1	1
5	Spain	0	0	1	1
Totals (6 entries)		2	2	2	6

=== Medalists ===
Event	Gold	Silver	Bronze
Boys	Brazil	Russia	Egypt
Girls	Portugal	Japan	Spain
