= Futsal at the 2018 Summer Youth Olympics – Boys' tournament =

2018 Summer Youth Olympics boys' futsal tournament
Tournament details
- Host country: Argentina
- Dates: 7–18 October 2018
- Teams: 10 (from 6 confederations)
- Venues: 2 (in 2 host cities)

Final positions
- Champions: Brazil (1st title)
- Runners-up: Russia
- Third place: Egypt
- Fourth place: Argentina

Tournament statistics
- Matches played: 24
- Goals scored: 174 (7.25 per match)
- Attendance: 72,606 (3,025 per match)
- Top scorer: (Brazil) Guilhermão (11 goals)

The boys' futsal tournament at the 2018 Summer Youth Olympics took place in Buenos Aires, Argentina between 7–18 October 2018.

== Squads ==
Each team had to name a preliminary squad of 20 players (minimum three must be goalkeepers). From the preliminary squad, the team had to name a final squad of 10 players (minimum two must be goalkeepers) by the FIFA deadline.

== Group stage ==
=== Group A ===
Pos	Team	Pld	W	D	L	GF	GA	GD	Pts	Qualification
1	Egypt	4	3	1	0	15	8	+7	10	Semi-finals
2	Argentina (H)	4	2	1	1	19	8	+11	7	Semi-finals
3	Iraq	4	2	1	1	12	5	+7	7	
4	Slovakia	4	1	0	3	5	12	−7	3	
5	Panama	4	0	1	3	7	25	−18	1	

Source: FIFA IOC
(H) Hosts
7 October 2018
18:00

Panama	1–1	Iraq
Ogilvie 29'	Report (FIFA); Report (IOC) Category:Futsal at the 2018 Summer Youth Olympics – Boys First Round – PAN-IRQ on Wikimedia Commons	Alaa 32'

Tecnópolis
Attendance: 3,600
Referee: Ricardo Amaral (Brazil)
7 October 2018
20:00

Argentina	2–2	Egypt
De Candia 37'; Hernández 39'	Report (FIFA); Report (IOC) Category:Futsal at the 2018 Summer Youth Olympics – Boys First Round – ARG-EGY on Wikimedia Commons	Morsy 12'; El-Sayed 17'

Tecnópolis
Attendance: 6,150
Referee: Miguel Oliveira (Portugal)

8 October 2018
20:00

Iraq	5–0	Slovakia
Abdulrahman 23', 30'; Kadhim 25', 28'; Sabri 35'	Report (FIFA); Report (IOC) Category:Futsal at the 2018 Summer Youth Olympics – Boys First Round – IRQ-SVK on Wikimedia Commons

Tecnópolis
Attendance: 650
Referee: Nikola Jelić (Croatia)
9 October 2018
20:00

Egypt	8–3	Panama
El-Sayed 5', 16', 27'; Talaat 15'; Mohsen 25', 32'; Morsy 28'; Abdelmagid 38'	Report (FIFA); Report (IOC)	Arévalo 20', 21'; Victoria 35'

Tecnópolis
Attendance: 1,200
Referee: Hussain Al-Bahhar (Bahrain)

10 October 2018
18:00

Slovakia	0–4	Argentina
	Report (FIFA); Report (IOC)	De Candia 2'; Ramírez 10'; Urriza 19'; Rufino 23'

Tecnópolis
Attendance: 6,150
Referee: Lee Po-fu (Chinese Taipei)
10 October 2018
20:00

Iraq	2–3	Egypt
Faeq 21'; Sabri 32'	Report (FIFA); Report (IOC)	El-Sayed 7'; Mohsen 10', 33'

Tecnópolis
Attendance: 850
Referee: Diego Molina (Costa Rica)

11 October 2018
20:00

Slovakia	4–1	Panama
Koricina 4', 33'; Bačo 12', 16'	Report (FIFA); Report (IOC)	Ogilvie 22'

Tecnópolis
Attendance: 985
Referee: Valeria Palma (Chile)
12 October 2018
20:00

Argentina	1–4	Iraq
Rufino 21'	Report (FIFA); Report (IOC)	Sabeeh 26'; Sabri 30'; Ismael 37'; Kadhim 37'

Tecnópolis
Attendance: 6,500
Referee: Nikola Jelić (Croatia)

13 October 2018
20:00

Panama	2–12	Argentina
Ogilvie 4'; Agrazal 19'	Report (FIFA); Report (IOC)	Gassman 5', 10', 13', 19', 23', 25'; Rufino 11'; Ramírez 16', 26'; Raggiati 34'; Hernández 36'; De Candia 40' (pen.)

Tecnópolis
Attendance: 6,500
Referee: Khalid Hnich (Morocco)
13 October 2018
20:00

Egypt	2–1	Slovakia
El-Sayed 14'; Morsy 24'	Report (FIFA); Report (IOC)	Šlehofer 38'

CeNARD
Attendance: 777
Referee: Gelareh Nazemi (Iran)

=== Group B ===
Pos	Team	Pld	W	D	L	GF	GA	GD	Pts	Qualification
1	Brazil	4	4	0	0	25	4	+21	12	Semi-finals
2	Russia	4	3	0	1	19	12	+7	9	Semi-finals
3	Iran	4	2	0	2	19	11	+8	6	
4	Costa Rica	4	1	0	3	17	27	−10	3	
5	Solomon Islands	4	0	0	4	13	39	−26	0	

Source: FIFA IOC
7 October 2018
18:00

Costa Rica	1–6	Russia
Corrales 27'	Report (FIFA); Report (IOC)	Sysoliatin 2'; Karpiuk 5', 15'; Fedorov 10', 31'; Subbotin 33'

CeNARD
Attendance: 0
Referee: David Urdánoz (Spain)
7 October 2018
20:00

Iran	9–2	Solomon Islands
Alizadeh 6', 12', 22'; Ghanbari 11'; Tamizi 18', 37'; Esmaeili 35', 36'; Sarbaz 38'	Report (FIFA); Report (IOC)	Lea'i 23', 39'

CeNARD
Attendance: 0
Referee: José Barrera (El Salvador)

8 October 2018
18:00

Russia	1–6	Brazil
Fedorov 37'	Report (FIFA); Report (IOC) Category:Futsal at the 2018 Summer Youth Olympics – Boys First Round – RUS-BRA on Wikimedia Commons	Neguinho 13', 39'; Breno 21'; Wesley 23'; Yuri 24' (pen.); Guilhermão 39'

Tecnópolis
Attendance: 1,250
Referee: Mohamed Hassan (Egypt)
9 October 2018
18:00

Solomon Islands	6–11	Costa Rica
Kofana 4', 15'; Mana 19'; Lea'i 20'; Rukumana 39'; Chavarria 39' (o.g.)	Report (FIFA); Report (IOC)	Carvajal 1'; León 7', 21', 22', 25'; Chavarria 8'; Madriz 11'; Vado 16'; Corrales 18', 26'; Baez 37'

Tecnópolis
Attendance: 1,350
Referee: Lance Vanhaitsma (United States)

10 October 2018
18:00

Brazil	4–0	Iran
Guilhermão 1', 16'; Neguinho 29'; Moura 38'	Report (FIFA); Report (IOC) Category:Futsal at the 2018 Summer Youth Olympics – Boys First Round – BRA-IRI on Wikimedia Commons

CeNARD
Attendance: 788
Referee: Miguel Oliveira (Portugal)
10 October 2018
20:00

Russia	10–4	Solomon Islands
Karpiuk 1', 12', 13'; Sysoliatin 10'; Okulov 12', 39'; Karpov 14'; Fedorov 19'; Gereikhanov 28'; Samusenko 34'	Report (FIFA); Report (IOC)	Lea'i 18', 22', 29', 38'

CeNARD
Attendance: 576
Referee: Chiara Perona (Italy)

11 October 2018
18:00

Brazil	6–2	Costa Rica
Guilhermão 3', 4', 39'; Wesley 19', 27'; Vitão 24'	Report (FIFA); Report (IOC)	Carvajal 23'; León 39'

Tecnópolis
Attendance: 1,570
Referee: Ovidiu Curta (Romania)
12 October 2018
18:00

Iran	1–2	Russia
Alizadeh 31'	Report (FIFA); Report (IOC)	Karpiuk 32' (pen.); Fedorov 38'

Tecnópolis
Attendance: 6,100
Referee: Hiroyuki Kobayashi (Japan)

13 October 2018
18:00

Costa Rica	3–9	Iran
Corrales 1', 3'; Mora 6'	Report (FIFA); Report (IOC)	Tamizi 5'; Adelipour 14'; Alizadeh 15'; Mehdikhani 16'; Aghapour 17' (pen.), 35'; Esmaeili 19' (pen.), 21'; Ghanbari 27' (pen.)

Tecnópolis
Attendance: 6,410
Referee: Ovidiu Curta (Romania)
13 October 2018
18:00

Solomon Islands	1–9	Brazil
Mana 26'	Report (FIFA); Report (IOC)	Guilhermão 1', 10', 21', 24'; Vitão 5'; Cromwell 10' (o.g.); Breno 11'; Wesley 38', 38'

CeNARD
Attendance: 0
Referee: Chiara Perona (Italy)

== Knockout stage ==
=== Bracket ===
Semi-finals
15 October – Tecnópolis
Brazil	3
Argentina	2
15 October – Tecnópolis
Egypt	1
Russia	3

Gold medal match
18 October – Tecnópolis
Brazil	4
Russia	1
Bronze medal match
18 October – Tecnópolis
Argentina	4
Egypt	5

=== Semi-finals ===
15 October 2018
18:00

Egypt	1–3	Russia
El-Sayed 10'	Report (FIFA); Report (IOC) Category:Futsal at the 2018 Summer Youth Olympics – Boys Semifinals – EGY-RUS on Wikimedia Commons	Cherniavskii 3'; Okulov 4'; Karpiuk 20'

Tecnópolis
Attendance: 6,500
Referee: Khalid Hnich (Morocco)
15 October 2018
20:00

Brazil	3–2	Argentina
Guilhermão 1'; Neguinho 11'; Breno 28'	Report (FIFA); Report (IOC)	Raggiati 19' (pen.); Rufino 21'

Tecnópolis
Attendance: 6,500
Referee: Nikola Jelić (Croatia)

=== Bronze medal match ===
18 October 2018
10:30

Argentina	4–5	Egypt
Ramírez 1', 10'; Raggiati 4'; De Candia 40'	Report (FIFA); Report (IOC) Category:Futsal at the 2018 Summer Youth Olympics – Boys Bronze medal match on Wikimedia Commons	Talaat 16', 21', 31', 39'; Ahmed 20'

Tecnópolis
Attendance: 4,800
Referee: David Urdánoz (Spain)

=== Gold medal match ===
18 October 2018
13:00

Brazil	4–1	Russia
Karpiuk 1' (o.g.); Breno 20'; Moura 28'; Françoar 39'	Report (FIFA); Report (IOC) Category:Futsal at the 2018 Summer Youth Olympics – Boys Final on Wikimedia Commons	Samusenko 38'

Tecnópolis
Attendance: 3,400
Referee: Mohamed Hassan (Egypt)

== Overall ranking ==
Pos	Team	Pld	W	D	L	GF	GA	GD	Pts
1st place, gold medalist(s)	Brazil	6	6	0	0	32	7	+25	18
2nd place, silver medalist(s)	Russia	6	4	0	2	23	17	+6	12
3rd place, bronze medalist(s)	Egypt	6	4	1	1	21	15	+6	13
4	Argentina (H)	6	2	1	3	25	16	+9	7
5	Iraq	4	2	1	1	12	5	+7	7
6	Iran	4	2	0	2	19	11	+8	6
7	Slovakia	4	1	0	3	5	12	−7	3
8	Costa Rica	4	1	0	3	17	27	−10	3
9	Panama	4	0	1	3	7	25	−18	1
10	Solomon Islands	4	0	0	4	13	39	−26	0

Source: IOC
Rules for classification: (5th to 10th place) 1) points; 2) goal difference; 3) goals scored; 4) equal ranking if still tied (regulations Article 15.6).
(H) Hosts

== Goalscorers ==
There were 174 goals scored in 24 matches, for an average of 7.25 goals per match.

11 goals

- (Brazil) Guilhermão

7 goals

- (Egypt) Belal El-Sayed
- (Russia) Danil Karpiuk
- (Solomon Islands) Raphael Lea'i

6 goals

- (Argentina) Facundo Gassman

5 goals

- (Argentina) Ezequiel Ramírez
- (Brazil) Wesley
- (Costa Rica) Iván Corrales
- (Costa Rica) Yosel León
- (Egypt) Mohamed Talaat
- (Iran) Mehdi Alizadeh
- (Russia) Ilia Fedorov

4 goals

- (Argentina) Alan De Candia
- (Argentina) Santiago Rufino
- (Brazil) Breno
- (Brazil) Neguinho
- (Egypt) Youssif Mohsen
- (Iran) Belal Esmaeili

3 goals

- (Argentina) Agustín Raggiati
- (Egypt) Moamen Morsy
- (Iran) Reza Tamizi
- (Iraq) Salim Kadhim
- (Iraq) Hussein Sabri
- (Panama) Jair Ogilvie
- (Russia) Maxim Okulov

2 goals

- (Argentina) Joaquín Hernández
- (Brazil) Moura
- (Brazil) Vitão
- (Costa Rica) Jafeth Carvajal
- (Iran) Salar Aghapour
- (Iran) Reza Ghanbari
- (Iraq) Hussein Abdulrahman
- (Panama) Daniel Arévalo
- (Russia) Danil Samusenko
- (Russia) Pavel Sysoliatin
- (Slovakia) Sebastián Bačo
- (Slovakia) Jozef Koricina
- (Solomon Islands) Leon Kofana
- (Solomon Islands) Junior Mana

1 goal

- (Argentina) Valentino Urriza
- (Brazil) Françoar
- (Brazil) Yuri
- (Costa Rica) Dilan Baez
- (Costa Rica) Josué Chavarria
- (Costa Rica) José Madriz
- (Costa Rica) Sebastián Mora
- (Costa Rica) Kevin Vado
- (Egypt) Moustafa Abdelmagid
- (Egypt) Mohamed Ahmed Ali
- (Iran) Sajjad Adelipour
- (Iran) Mehdi Mehdikhani
- (Iran) Sajjad Sarbaz
- (Iraq) Hadi Alaa
- (Iraq) Mohammed Faeq
- (Iraq) Mohammed Ismael
- (Iraq) Ezzat Sabeeh
- (Panama) Carlos Agrazal
- (Panama) Joel Victoria
- (Russia) Igor Cherniavskii
- (Russia) Kamil Gereikhanov
- (Russia) Pavel Karpov
- (Russia) Denis Subbotin
- (Slovakia) Matúš Šlehofer
- (Solomon Islands) Franster Rukumana

1 own goal

- (Costa Rica) Josué Chavarria (against Solomon Islands)
- (Russia) Danil Karpiuk (against Brazil)
- (Solomon Islands) Ronado Cromwell (against Brazil)
