= 2016 OFC Nations Cup final =

- Event: 2016 OFC Nations Cup
New Zealand	Papua New Guinea
(New Zealand)	(Papua New Guinea)
0	0
- After extra time New Zealand won 4–2 on penalties
- Date: 11 June 2016
- Venue: Sir John Guise Stadium, Port Moresby
- Referee: Norbert Hauata (Tahiti)
- Attendance: 13,000

The 2016 OFC Nations Cup final was a football match that took place on 11 June 2016 at the Sir John Guise Stadium, Port Moresby. It was the final match of the 2016 OFC Nations Cup, the 10th edition of the OFC Nations Cup, a competition for national teams in Oceania.

It was contested between New Zealand and hosts Papua New Guinea. It was New Zealand's 5th final, previously having won three of them as well as a fourth title in the round robin system used in the 2008 edition. It was Papua New Guinea's first appearance in a final of the competition. In the group stage, New Zealand topped Group B without dropping a point while Papua New Guinea won Group A on goal difference with two draws and a win. In the semi-finals New Zealand beat New Caledonia 1–0 and Papua New Guinea beat Solomon Islands 2–1.

Neither team managed to score in 90 minutes so the game went to extra time. The 30 minutes of extra time produced no goals, so the game went to penalties. Papua New Guinea's Koriak Upaiga was first to miss in the shoot-out. After three penalties each, the score was 3–2 to New Zealand. The next penalty for both teams was missed with Jeremy Brockie for New Zealand and Raymond Gunemba for Papua New Guinea both missing their spot kicks. This left Marco Rojas with the opportunity to seal the game for New Zealand. He did so and in doing so qualified his nation for the 2017 FIFA Confederations Cup. The 2016 final was the first OFC Nations Cup final to be decided on penalties.

== Background ==
New Zealand were playing in their 5th OFC Nations Cup final, having won in 1973, 1998 and 2002 and having lost in 2000. They had also won the competition in 2008 when the winner was decided in a round-robin system. Papua New Guinea were featuring in their first OFC Nations Cup final. In their three previous OFC Nations Cup participations before 2016, they didn't get out of the group stage.

The two nations had met in official FIFA matches four times before the 2016 OFC Nations Cup Final. The first two matches were in 1997 as part of the second round of Oceanian 1988 FIFA World Cup qualification. The first game was in Port Moresby, Papua New Guinea and Papua New Guinea won 1–0 with Francis Niakuam scoring the winning goal. In the return match held in Auckland, New Zealand, New Zealand won 7–0. New Zealand ended up topping the qualification group and progressing to the final stage while Papua New Guinea finished bottom of the group. The third match between the two nations was in the 2002 OFC Nations Cup and New Zealand won 9–1. The fourth and most recent game between New Zealand and Papua New Guinea before the 2016 OFC Nations Cup final, was in Group B of the 2012 OFC Nations Cup. New Zealand won 2–1 and that meant they led the head-to-head record between themselves and Papua New Guinea 3–1 before the 2016 OFC Nations Cup Final.

== Route to the final ==
New Zealand
Round
Papua New Guinea
Opponents
Result
Group stage
Opponents
Result
Fiji
3–1
Match 1
New Caledonia
1–1
Vanuatu
5–0
Match 2
Tahiti
2–2
Solomon Islands
1–0
Match 3
Samoa
8–0
Group B winners

Pos	Team	Pld	Pts
1	New Zealand	3	9
2	Solomon Islands	3	3
3	Fiji	3	3
4	Vanuatu	3	3

Source: FIFA
Final standings
Group A winners

Pos	Team	Pld	Pts
1	Papua New Guinea (H)	3	5
2	New Caledonia	3	5
3	Tahiti	3	5
4	Samoa	3	0

Source: FIFA
(H) Hosts
Opponents
Result
Knockout stage
Opponents
Result
New Caledonia
1–0
Semi-finals
Solomon Islands
2–1

== Match ==
=== Details ===
11 June 2016
16:00

New Zealand	0–0 (a.e.t.)	Papua New Guinea
	Report (FIFA); Report (OFC)
Penalties
Fallon (penalty scored); McGlinchey (penalty scored); Dyer (penalty scored); Brockie (penalty missed); Rojas (penalty scored)	4–2	(penalty missed) Upaiga; (penalty scored) Semmy; (penalty scored) Foster; (penalty missed) Gunemba

Sir John Guise Stadium, Port Moresby
Attendance: 13,000
Referee: Norbert Hauata (Tahiti)

New Zealand	Papua New Guinea

GK	1	Stefan Marinovic
RWB	16	Louis Fenton	(yellow card) 27'
CB	5	Michael Boxall	(yellow card) 48'
CB	17	Luke Adams
CB	18	Sam Brotherton
LWB	2	Kip Colvey	(yellow card) 61'
CM	13	Monty Patterson		(substituted off) 53'
CM	8	Michael McGlinchey	(yellow card) 90+2'
AM	6	Bill Tuiloma		(substituted off) 71'
CF	7	Kosta Barbarouses		(substituted off) 55'
CF	14	Rory Fallon (c)
Substitutions:
MF	11	Marco Rojas		(substituted on) 53'
ST	15	Jeremy Brockie		(substituted on) 55'
MF	22	Moses Dyer		(substituted on) 71'
Manager:
(England) Anthony Hudson

GK	20	Ronald Warisan
RB	2	Daniel Joe
CB	5	Felix Komolong
CB	4	Alwin Komolong
LB	19	Koriak Upaiga
CM	14	Emmanuel Simon		(substituted off) 115'
CM	12	David Muta (c)
RW	9	Nigel Dabinyaba
AM	8	Michael Foster	(yellow card) 35'
LW	18	Tommy Semmy	(yellow card) 20'
CF	7	Raymond Gunemba	(yellow card) 117'
Substitutions:
MF	17	Jacob Sabua		(substituted on) 115'
Manager:
(Denmark) Flemming Serritslev

Assistant referees:
Tevita Makasini (Tonga)
Philippe Revel (Tahiti)
Fourth official:
Abdelkader Zitouni (Tahiti)

Match rules

- 90 minutes.
- 30 minutes of extra time if necessary.
- Penalty shoot-out if scores still level.
- Maximum of three substitutions.
