= 2016 OFC Nations Cup knockout stage =

The knockout stage of the 2016 OFC Nations Cup began on 8 June with the semi-finals and end on 11 June 2016 with the final at Sir John Guise Stadium in Port Moresby.

All match times are local, UTC+10.

== Format ==
In the knockout stage, if a match was level at the end of normal playing time, extra time was played (two periods of 15 minutes each). If still tied after extra time, the match was decided by a penalty shoot-out to determine the winners.

The OFC set out the following matchups for the semi-finals:

- Match 1: Winner Group B vs Runner-up Group A
- Match 2: Winner Group A vs Runner-up Group B

== Qualified teams ==
The top two placed teams from each of the two groups qualified for the knockout stage.

Group	Winners	Runners-up
A	Papua New Guinea	New Caledonia
B	New Zealand	Solomon Islands

== Bracket ==
Semi-finals
8 June – Port Moresby
New Zealand	1
New Caledonia	0
8 June – Port Moresby
Papua New Guinea	2
Solomon Islands	1

Final
11 June – Port Moresby
New Zealand (p)	0 (4)
Papua New Guinea	0 (2)

== Semi-finals ==
=== New Zealand vs New Caledonia ===
8 June 2016
16:10

New Zealand	1–0	New Caledonia
Wood 49'	Report (FIFA); Report (OFC)

Sir John Guise Stadium, Port Moresby
Attendance: 1,379
Referee: Abdelkader Zitouni (Tahiti)

New Zealand	New Caledonia

Assistant referees:
Ravinesh Kumar (Fiji)
Philippe Revel (Tahiti)
Fourth official:
Norbert Hauata (Tahiti)

=== Papua New Guinea vs Solomon Islands ===
8 June 2016
19:40

Papua New Guinea	2–1	Solomon Islands
Foster 38'; Dabinyaba 82'	Report (FIFA); Report (OFC)	Molea 41'

Sir John Guise Stadium, Port Moresby
Attendance: 3,548
Referee: Matthew Conger (New Zealand)

Papua New Guinea	Solomon Islands

Assistant referees:
Tevita Makasini (Tonga)
Mark Rule (New Zealand)
Fourth official:
Nick Waldron (New Zealand)

== Final ==
11 June 2016
16:00

New Zealand	0–0 (a.e.t.)	Papua New Guinea
	Report (FIFA); Report (OFC)
Penalties
Fallon (penalty scored); McGlinchey (penalty scored); Dyer (penalty scored); Brockie (penalty missed); Rojas (penalty scored)	4–2	(penalty missed) Upaiga; (penalty scored) Semmy; (penalty scored) Foster; (penalty missed) Gunemba

Sir John Guise Stadium, Port Moresby
Attendance: 13,000
Referee: Norbert Hauata (Tahiti)

New Zealand	Papua New Guinea

GK	1	Stefan Marinovic
RWB	16	Louis Fenton	(yellow card) 27'
CB	5	Michael Boxall	(yellow card) 48'
CB	17	Luke Adams
CB	18	Sam Brotherton
LWB	2	Kip Colvey	(yellow card) 61'
CM	13	Monty Patterson		(substituted off) 53'
CM	8	Michael McGlinchey	(yellow card) 90+2'
AM	6	Bill Tuiloma		(substituted off) 71'
CF	7	Kosta Barbarouses		(substituted off) 55'
CF	14	Rory Fallon (c)
Substitutions:
MF	11	Marco Rojas		(substituted on) 53'
ST	15	Jeremy Brockie		(substituted on) 55'
MF	22	Moses Dyer		(substituted on) 71'
Manager:
(England) Anthony Hudson

GK	20	Ronald Warisan
RB	2	Daniel Joe
CB	5	Felix Komolong
CB	4	Alwin Komolong
LB	19	Koriak Upaiga
CM	14	Emmanuel Simon		(substituted off) 115'
CM	12	David Muta (c)
RW	9	Nigel Dabinyaba
AM	8	Michael Foster	(yellow card) 35'
LW	18	Tommy Semmy	(yellow card) 20'
CF	7	Raymond Gunemba	(yellow card) 117'
Substitutions:
MF	17	Jacob Sabua		(substituted on) 115'
Manager:
(Denmark) Flemming Serritslev

Assistant referees:
Tevita Makasini (Tonga)
Philippe Revel (Tahiti)
Fourth official:
Abdelkader Zitouni (Tahiti)
