= Papua New Guinea national soccer team results =

The Papua New Guinea national soccer team represents Papua New Guinea in association football and is controlled by the Papua New Guinea Football Association (PNGFA), the governing body of the sport in the country. Shortly after joining the Fédération Internationale de Football Association (FIFA) and the Oceania Football Confederation (OFC) in 1963, it played its first match at the 1963 South Pacific Games – a 3–1 loss to Fiji.

From a total of 168 matches, Papua New Guinea has won 57, drawn 32 and lost 79, scoring 359 goals and conceding 350. The majority of its matches have been played at neutral venues.

Papua New Guinea initially competed as a territory of Australia before gaining independence in 1975. Its first match as an independent country was a 10–1 loss to Malaysia during qualification for the 1976 Summer Olympics in February 1976. Despite joining FIFA and the OFC in 1963, Papua New Guinea would not compete at the Oceania Cup – the forerunner to the OFC Men's Nations Cup – until 1980 and qualification for the FIFA World Cup until the 1998 qualification competition in 1996.

Papua New Guinea achieved their best result as hosts of the 2016 OFC Nations Cup. After advancing from the group stage unbeaten as group winners, they defeated the Solomon Islands 2–1 in the semi-finals to reach the final for the first time. Despite holding New Zealand to a goalless draw after extra time, Papua New Guinea finished runners-up after losing 4–2 on penalties.

Raymond Gunemba became Papua New Guinea's top goalscorer after scoring against Fiji during qualification for the 2026 FIFA World Cup in November 2024. Gunemba has scored a total of 18 goals in 39 caps since 2012.

== Key ==
Key to matches

- Att. = Match attendance
- (H) = Home ground
- (A) = Away ground
- (N) = Neutral ground

Key to record by opponent

- Pld = Games played
- W = Games won
- D = Games drawn
- L = Games lost
- GF = Goals for
- GA = Goals against

== Results ==
Papua New Guinea's score is shown first in each case.

No.	Date	Venue	Opponents	Score	Competition	Papua New Guinea scorers	Att.	Ref.
1	29 August 1963	Buckhurst Park, Suva (N)	Fiji	1–3	1963 South Pacific Games	Voelker	—	
2	9 December 1966	Nouméa (N)	Tahiti	3–4	1966 South Pacific Games	Unknown	—	
3	13 December 1966	Nouméa (N)	Wallis and Futuna	9–1	1966 South Pacific Games	Unknown	—	
4	15 December 1966	Nouméa (N)	New Caledonia	0–4	1966 South Pacific Games		—	
5	17 December 1966	Nouméa (N)	New Hebrides	2–5	1966 South Pacific Games	Unknown	—	
6	14 August 1969	Club Germania, Port Moresby (N)	New Caledonia	1–4	1969 South Pacific Games	Kumalau	—	
7	15 August 1969	Club Germania, Port Moresby (N)	Tahiti	1–3	1969 South Pacific Games	Unknown	—	
8	16 August 1969	Club Germania, Port Moresby (N)	Solomon Islands	4–0	1969 South Pacific Games	Martinecz, others unknown	—	
9	18 August 1969	Club Germania, Port Moresby (N)	New Hebrides	2–1	1969 South Pacific Games	Kau, Raka	—	
10	20 August 1969	Club Germania, Port Moresby (N)	Fiji	1–1	1969 South Pacific Games	Unknown	—	
11	22 August 1969	Club Germania, Port Moresby (N)	Fiji	2–1	1969 South Pacific Games	Jojoga	—	
12	9 September 1971	Papeete (N)	Tahiti	2–2	1971 South Pacific Games	Unknown	—	
13	11 September 1971	Papeete (N)	Cook Islands	16–1	1971 South Pacific Games	Unknown	—	
14	16 September 1971	Papeete (N)	New Caledonia	0–4	1971 South Pacific Games		—	
15	18 September 1971	Papeete (N)	Tahiti	1–8	1971 South Pacific Games	Unknown	—	
16	2 August 1975	Guam (N)	New Hebrides	0–3	1975 South Pacific Games		—	
17	4 August 1975	Guam (N)	Tahiti	2–4	1975 South Pacific Games	Unknown	—	
18	5 August 1975	Guam (N)	New Caledonia	1–5	1975 South Pacific Games	Unknown	—	
19	15 February 1976	Jakarta (N)	Malaysia	1–10	1976 Summer Olympics qualification	Unknown	—	
20	17 February 1976	Jakarta (A)	Indonesia	2–8	1976 Summer Olympics qualification	Unknown	—	
21	20 February 1976	Jakarta (N)	Singapore	4–7	1976 Summer Olympics qualification	Unknown	—	
22	22 February 1976	Jakarta (N)	North Korea	0–4	1976 Summer Olympics qualification		—	
23	7 July 1978	Solomon Islands (A)	Solomon Islands	2–0	Friendly	Unknown	—	
24	29 August 1979	Buckhurst Park, Suva (N)	Fiji	0–0	1979 South Pacific Games		—	
25	31 August 1979	Bidesi Park, Suva (N)	Kiribati	13–0	1979 South Pacific Games	Unknown	—	
26	3 September 1979	Ratu Cakobau Park, Nausori (N)	Solomon Islands	2–3	1979 South Pacific Games	Manhi, Sami	—	
27	5 September 1979	Ratu Cakobau Park, Nausori (N)	New Hebrides	0–2	1979 South Pacific Games		—	
28	24 February 1980	Stade Numa-Daly Magenta, Nouméa (N)	New Hebrides	4–3	1980 OFC Nations Cup	Unknown	—	
29	26 February 1980	Stade Numa-Daly Magenta, Nouméa (N)	Australia	2–11	1980 OFC Nations Cup	Unknown	—	
30	28 February 1980	Stade Numa-Daly Magenta, Nouméa (N)	New Caledonia	0–8	1980 OFC Nations Cup		—	
31	8 July 1981	SIPL, Honiara (N)	Fiji	3–2	1981 South Pacific Mini Games	Semoso (2), Sami	—	
32	9 July 1981	Lawson Tama Stadium, Honiara (N)	Western Samoa	4–1	1981 South Pacific Mini Games	Kanawi (2), Mombi, Patterson	—	
33	10 July 1981	Lawson Tama Stadium, Honiara (N)	New Caledonia	1–5	1981 South Pacific Mini Games	Sami	—	
34	11 July 1981	Lawson Tama Stadium, Honiara (N)	Tahiti	0–5	1981 South Pacific Mini Games		—	
35	13 July 1981	Lawson Tama Stadium, Honiara (N)	Vanuatu	3–2	1981 South Pacific Mini Games	Sami (3)	—	
36	14 July 1981	Lawson Tama Stadium, Honiara (N)	Solomon Islands	2–1	1981 South Pacific Mini Games	Kondas, Semoso	—	
37	15 July 1981	Lawson Tama Stadium, Honiara (N)	Vanuatu	1–0	1981 South Pacific Mini Games	Sami	—	
38	21 August 1983	Taipei (A)	Chinese Taipei	3–3	1984 Summer Olympics qualification	Sami (3)	—	
39	22 August 1983	Apia Park, Apia (N)	Niue	19–0	1983 South Pacific Games	Unknown	—	
40	23 August 1983	Taipei (A)	Chinese Taipei	0–0 (2–4p)	1984 Summer Olympics qualification		—	
41	24 August 1983	Apia Park, Apia (N)	Tahiti	1–2	1983 South Pacific Games	Unknown	—	
42	26 August 1983	Apia Park, Apia (N)	Fiji	0–2	1983 South Pacific Games		—	
43	28 August 1983	Apia Park, Apia (N)	Tahiti	1–6	1983 South Pacific Games	Unknown	—	
44	24 August 1984	Stadium Merdeka, Kuala Lumpur (N)	Liberia	2–1	1984 Merdeka Tournament	Unknown	—	
45	29 August 1984	Stadium Merdeka, Kuala Lumpur (N)	Thailand	4–1	1984 Merdeka Tournament	Saragum, Pasar, Quazie, Popal	—	
46	1 September 1984	Stadium Merdeka, Kuala Lumpur (N)	Indonesia	1–0	1984 Merdeka Tournament	Quazie	—	
47	4 September 1984	Stadium Merdeka, Kuala Lumpur (N)	Malaysia	1–5	1984 Merdeka Tournament	Saleh	—	
48	16 September 1985	Lae (H)	China	1–4	Friendly	Unknown	—	
49	19 September 1985	Port Moresby (H)	China	1–1	Friendly	Unknown	—	
50	9 December 1987	Nouméa (N)	Tahiti	0–0	1987 South Pacific Games		—	
51	10 December 1987	Nouméa (N)	New Caledonia	0–2	1987 South Pacific Games		—	
52	12 December 1987	Nouméa (N)	Vanuatu	1–1	1987 South Pacific Games	Unknown	—	
53	15 December 1987	Nouméa (N)	American Samoa	20–0	1987 South Pacific Games	Unknown	—	
54	17 December 1987	Nouméa (N)	Wallis and Futuna	2–0	1987 South Pacific Games	Unknown	—	
55	19 December 1987	Nouméa (N)	Vanuatu	3–1	1987 South Pacific Games	Unknown	—	
56	28 October 1989	Fiji (N)	Fiji	1–2	1989 Melanesia Cup	Unknown	—	
57	31 October 1989	Fiji (N)	Vanuatu	3–0	1989 Melanesia Cup	Unknown	—	
58	3 November 1989	Fiji (N)	Solomon Islands	0–0	1989 Melanesia Cup		—	
59	4 November 1989	Fiji (N)	New Caledonia	1–2	1989 Melanesia Cup	Unknown	—	
60	3 November 1990	Nouméa (N)	New Caledonia	1–2	1990 Melanesia Cup	Paulus	—	
61	5 November 1990	Nouméa (N)	Vanuatu	0–1	1990 Melanesia Cup		—	
62	6 November 1990	Koné (N)	Solomon Islands	0–1	1990 Melanesia Cup		—	
63	8 November 1990	Nouméa (N)	Fiji	0–1	1990 Melanesia Cup		—	
64	9 September 1990	Sir Ignatius Kilage Stadium, Lae (N)	Solomon Islands	0–0	1991 South Pacific Games		—	
65	11 September 1990	Sir Ignatius Kilage Stadium, Lae (N)	Vanuatu	0–1	1991 South Pacific Games		—	
66	13 September 1990	Sir Ignatius Kilage Stadium, Lae (N)	Wallis and Futuna	5–0	1991 South Pacific Games	Unknown	—	
67	8 December 1993	Port Vila (N)	New Caledonia	1–1	1993 South Pacific Mini Games	Unknown	—	
68	10 December 1993	Port Vila (N)	Tonga	5–0	1993 South Pacific Mini Games	Unknown	—	
69	13 September 1993	Port Vila (N)	Vanuatu	0–1	1993 South Pacific Mini Games		—	
70	3 July 1994	Honiara (N)	New Caledonia	1–0	1994 Melanesia Cup	Unknown	—	
71	5 July 1994	Honiara (N)	Solomon Islands	0–2	1994 Melanesia Cup		—	
72	6 July 1994	Honiara (N)	Fiji	0–1	1994 Melanesia Cup		—	
73	7 July 1994	Honiara (N)	Vanuatu	1–1	1994 Melanesia Cup	Unknown	—	
74	16 August 1995	Papeete (N)	Fiji	2–2	1995 South Pacific Games	Unknown	—	
75	20 August 1995	Papeete (N)	Vanuatu	0–3	1995 South Pacific Games		—	
76	22 August 1995	Papeete (N)	Guam	9–0	1995 South Pacific Games	Unknown	—	
77	16 September 1996	Lae (H)	Solomon Islands	1–1	1998 FIFA World Cup qualification	Daniel	—	
78	20 September 1996	Lae (H)	Vanuatu	2–1	1998 FIFA World Cup qualification	Furigi, Karang	—	
79	31 May 1997	Sir Hubert Murray Stadium, Port Moresby (H)	New Zealand	1–0	1998 FIFA World Cup qualification	Niakuam	3,000	
80	11 June 1997	North Harbour Stadium, Auckland (A)	New Zealand	0–7	1998 FIFA World Cup qualification		4,000	
81	15 June 1997	Suva (A)	Fiji	1–3	1998 FIFA World Cup qualification	Waiwai	—	
82	21 June 1997	Port Moresby (H)	Fiji	0–1	1998 FIFA World Cup qualification		—	
83	5 September 1998	Espiritu Santo (N)	Solomon Islands	1–3	1998 Melanesia Cup	Unknown	—	
84	7 September 1998	Espiritu Santo (N)	New Caledonia	1–0	1998 Melanesia Cup	Unknown	—	
85	8 September 1998	Espiritu Santo (N)	Vanuatu	1–1	1998 Melanesia Cup	Unknown	—	
86	10 September 1998	Espiritu Santo (N)	Fiji	0–2	1998 Melanesia Cup		—	
87	19 September 1998	Honiara (A)	Solomon Islands	1–2	Friendly	Unknown	—	
88	8 April 2000	Suva (N)	Fiji	0–5	2000 Melanesia Cup		—	
89	11 April 2000	Suva (N)	New Caledonia	1–6	2000 Melanesia Cup	Mali	—	
90	13 April 2000	Suva (N)	Solomon Islands	2–4	2000 Melanesia Cup	Isalah, Geoferey	—	
91	15 April 2000	Suva (N)	Vanuatu	1–4	2000 Melanesia Cup	Paliwa	—	
92	12 March 2002	Toleofoa Joseph Blatter Soccer Complex, Apia (N)	New Caledonia	4–1	2002 OFC Nations Cup qualification	Kombi, Tomda, Aisa, Davani	—	
93	14 March 2002	Toleofoa Joseph Blatter Soccer Complex, Apia (N)	Tonga	5–0	2002 OFC Nations Cup qualification	Lohai, Moiyap, Davani, Aisa, Kassam	—	
94	16 March 2002	Toleofoa Joseph Blatter Soccer Complex, Apia (N)	Samoa	4–1	2002 OFC Nations Cup qualification	Kombi, Wasi, Elizah, Moiyap	—	
95	18 March 2002	Toleofoa Joseph Blatter Soccer Complex, Apia (N)	American Samoa	7–0	2002 OFC Nations Cup qualification	Davani (3), Posman, Aisa, Lohai, Wasi	—	
96	5 July 2002	North Harbour Stadium, Auckland (N)	Solomon Islands	0–0	2002 OFC Nations Cup		1,000	
97	7 July 2002	North Harbour Stadium, Auckland (N)	New Zealand	1–9	2002 OFC Nations Cup	Aisa	1,000	
98	9 July 2002	North Harbour Stadium, Auckland (N)	Tahiti	1–3	2002 OFC Nations Cup	Davani	800	
99	14 June 2003	Port Moresby (H)	Solomon Islands	3–5	Friendly	Unknown	—	
100	30 June 2003	National Stadium, Suva (N)	New Caledonia	0–2	2003 South Pacific Games		—	
101	1 July 2003	National Stadium, Suva (N)	Tonga	2–2	2003 South Pacific Games	Sow, Habuka	3,000	
102	3 July 2003	National Stadium, Suva (N)	Tahiti	0–3	2003 South Pacific Games		1,000	
103	7 July 2003	Churchill Park, Lautoka (N)	Federated States of Micronesia	10–0	2003 South Pacific Games	Devani (3), Pomat (2), Foster, Posman (2), Ire, A. Lepani	3,500	
104	10 May 2004	Toleofoa Joseph Blatter Soccer Complex, Apia (N)	Vanuatu	1–1	2006 FIFA World Cup qualification	Wasi	500	
105	12 May 2004	Toleofoa Joseph Blatter Soccer Complex, Apia (N)	Fiji	2–4	2006 FIFA World Cup qualification	Davani, Komboi	400	
106	17 May 2004	Toleofoa Joseph Blatter Soccer Complex, Apia (N)	American Samoa	10–0	2006 FIFA World Cup qualification	Davani (4), A. Lepani (3), Wasi, Komboi, Lohai	150	
107	19 May 2004	Toleofoa Joseph Blatter Soccer Complex, Apia (N)	Samoa	4–1	2006 FIFA World Cup qualification	Davani, A. Lepani, N. Lepani, Komeng	300	
108	13 July 2007	Honiara (A)	Solomon Islands	1–2	Friendly	Unknown	—	
109	27 August 2011	Stade Boewa, Boulari Bay (N)	Cook Islands	4–0	2011 Pacific Games	Hans (2), D. Muta, N. Lepani	—	
110	1 September 2011	Stade Boewa, Boulari Bay (N)	Tahiti	1–1	2011 Pacific Games	C. Muta	—	
111	3 September 2011	Stade Boewa, Boulari Bay (N)	Kiribati	17–1	2011 Pacific Games	Kini (3), N. Lepani (4), Foster, Hans (2), Moka (3), Yasasa (2), Bondaluke, Wasi	—	
112	5 September 2011	Stade Boewa, Boulari Bay (N)	Fiji	0–2	2011 Pacific Games		—	
113	2 June 2012	Lawson Tama Stadium, Honiara (N)	Solomon Islands	0–1	2012 OFC Nations Cup		15,000	
114	4 June 2012	Lawson Tama Stadium, Honiara (N)	New Zealand	1–2	2012 OFC Nations Cup	Hans	3,000	
115	6 June 2012	Lawson Tama Stadium, Honiara (N)	Fiji	1–1	2012 OFC Nations Cup	Jack	3,000	
116	6 September 2014	Hougang Stadium, Singapore (A)	Singapore	1–2	Friendly	Gunemba	—	
117	12 October 2014	Rizal Memorial Stadium, Manila (A)	Philippines	0–5	Friendly		—	
118	24 March 2016	Lawson Tama Stadium, Honiara (A)	Solomon Islands	0–2	Friendly		—	
119	27 March 2016	Lawson Tama Stadium, Honiara (A)	Solomon Islands	2–1	Friendly	Gunemba, Foster	—	
120	29 May 2016	Sir John Guise Stadium, Port Moresby (N)	New Caledonia	1–1	2016 OFC Nations Cup	Semmy	4,231	
121	1 June 2016	Sir John Guise Stadium, Port Moresby (N)	Tahiti	2–2	2016 OFC Nations Cup	Gunemba	1,643	
122	5 June 2016	Sir John Guise Stadium, Port Moresby (N)	Samoa	8–0	2016 OFC Nations Cup	Foster (2), Gunemba (3), Dabinyaba (2), Upaiga	2,678	
123	8 June 2016	Sir John Guise Stadium, Port Moresby (N)	Solomon Islands	2–1	2016 OFC Nations Cup	Foster, Dabinyaba	3,548	
124	11 June 2016	Sir John Guise Stadium, Port Moresby (N)	New Zealand	0–0 (2–4p)	2016 OFC Nations Cup		13,000	
125	17 June 2016	Sir John Guise Stadium, Port Moresby (H)	Malaysia	2–0	Friendly	Semmy (2)	—	
126	10 November 2016	Shah Alam Stadium, Shah Alam (N)	Iran	1–8	Friendly	Dabinyaba	—	
127	14 November 2016	Shah Alam Stadium, Shah Alam (A)	Malaysia	1–2	Friendly	Dabinyaba	—	
128	23 March 2017	Sir John Guise Stadium, Port Moresby (H)	Tahiti	1–3	2018 FIFA World Cup qualification	Dabinyaba	4,209	
129	28 March 2017	Stade Pater Te Hono Nui, Pirae (A)	Tahiti	2–1	2018 FIFA World Cup qualification	Aisa, Gunemba	5,000	
130	9 June 2017	Lawson Tama Stadium, Honiara (A)	Solomon Islands	2–3	2018 FIFA World Cup qualification	Foster, Aisa	14,700	
131	13 June 2017	PNG Football Stadium, Port Moresby (H)	Solomon Islands	1–2	2018 FIFA World Cup qualification	Gunemba	2,035	
132	8 July 2019	National Soccer Stadium, Apia (N)	Samoa	6–0	2019 Pacific Games	K. Kepo (3), Dabinyaba, Gunemba, A. Kepo	1,000	
133	10 July 2019	National Soccer Stadium, Apia (N)	Vanuatu	2–0	2019 Pacific Games	Gunemba, Simon	1,000	
134	18 July 2019	National Soccer Stadium, Apia (N)	Tonga	8–0	2019 Pacific Games	Kamen (2), Dabinyaba, Simon (3), Aisa, Upaiga	100	
135	20 July 2019	National Soccer Stadium, Apia (N)	Fiji	1–1 (2–4p)	2019 Pacific Games	K. Kepo	700	
136	18 March 2022	Qatar SC Stadium, Doha (N)	New Zealand	0–1	2022 FIFA World Cup qualification		0	
137	21 March 2022	Qatar SC Stadium, Doha (N)	New Caledonia	1–0	2022 FIFA World Cup qualification	Semmy	0	
138	24 March 2022	Qatar SC Stadium, Doha (N)	Fiji	2–1	2022 FIFA World Cup qualification	A. Kepo, Semmy	0	
139	27 March 2022	Al-Arabi Stadium, Doha (N)	Solomon Islands	2–3	2022 FIFA World Cup qualification	Komolong, A. Kepo	0	
140	24 September 2022	Korman Stadium, Port Vila (N)	Vanuatu	1–0	2022 MSG Prime Minister's Cup	A. Kepo	—	
141	27 September 2022	Luganville Soccer Stadium, Luganville (N)	Fiji	1–0	2022 MSG Prime Minister's Cup	Dabinyaba	—	
142	16 June 2023	National Stadium, Singapore (A)	Singapore	2–2	Friendly	A. Kepo, Gunemba	—	
143	20 June 2023	Sultan Mizan Zainal Abidin Stadium, Kuala Nerus (A)	Malaysia	0–10	Friendly		—	
144	8 October 2023	Stade Numa-Daly Magenta, Nouméa (N)	Solomon Islands	1–3	2023 MSG Prime Minister's Cup	Gunemba	—	
145	11 October 2023	Stade Yoshida, Koné (N)	New Caledonia	1–3	2023 MSG Prime Minister's Cup	Semmy	—	
146	14 October 2023	Stade Numa-Daly Magenta, Nouméa (N)	Vanuatu	0–1	2023 MSG Prime Minister's Cup		—	
147	17 November 2023	Lawson Tama Stadium, Honiara (N)	Tuvalu	3–0 (awarded)	2023 Pacific Games		—	
148	23 November 2023	Lawson Tama Stadium, Honiara (N)	Vanuatu	1–1	2023 Pacific Games	A. Kepo	—	
149	27 November 2023	SIFF Academy Field, Honiara (N)	Cook Islands	3–0 (awarded)	2023 Pacific Games		—	
150	30 November 2023	SIFF Academy Field, Honiara (N)	Tahiti	0–2	2023 Pacific Games		—	
151	22 March 2024	Colombo Racecourse, Colombo (A)	Sri Lanka	0–0	2024 FIFA Series		5,089	
152	25 March 2024	Colombo Racecourse, Colombo (N)	Central African Republic	0–4	2024 FIFA Series		550	
153	16 June 2024	National Stadium, Suva (N)	Fiji	1–5	2024 OFC Nations Cup	Semmy	1,700	
154	19 June 2024	National Stadium, Suva (N)	Tahiti	1–1	2024 OFC Nations Cup	Paul	500	
155	22 June 2024	National Stadium, Suva (N)	Samoa	2–1	2024 OFC Nations Cup	Semmy, A. Kepo	500	
156	10 October 2024	National Stadium, Suva (N)	New Caledonia	1–3	2026 FIFA World Cup qualification	Semmy	1,000	
157	14 November 2024	PNG Football Stadium, Port Moresby (N)	Fiji	3–3	2026 FIFA World Cup qualification	Joe, A. Kepo, Gunemba	1,428	
158	17 November 2024	PNG Football Stadium, Port Moresby (N)	Solomon Islands	1–2	2026 FIFA World Cup qualification	Semmy	1,284	
159	15 December 2024	National Stadium, Honiara (N)	Fiji	1–1	2024 MSG Prime Minister's Cup	Gunemba	—	
160	18 December 2024	National Stadium, Honiara (N)	Solomon Islands	3–2	2024 MSG Prime Minister's Cup	Komolong (2), Rani	—	
161	21 December 2024	Lawson Tama Stadium, Honiara (N)	Vanuatu	2–1	2024 MSG Prime Minister's Cup	A. Kepo, Gunemba	—	
162	13 November 2025	PNG Football Stadium, Port Moresby (N)	Solomon Islands	1–0	2025 MSG Prime Minister's Cup	Paul	—	
163	20 November 2025	PNG Football Stadium, Port Moresby (N)	Fiji	2–0	2025 MSG Prime Minister's Cup	Gunemba (2)	—	
164	23 November 2025	Sir John Guise Stadium, Port Moresby (N)	Vanuatu	2–2 (4–5p)	2025 MSG Prime Minister's Cup	A. Kepo, Paul	—	
165	18 September 2026	National Stadium, Suva (N)	Vanuatu	2–1	2026 MSG Prime Minister's Cup	Moses, Vela	—	
166	24 September 2026	National Stadium, Suva (N)	New Caledonia	1–2	2026 MSG Prime Minister's Cup	A. Kepo	—	
167	27 September 2026	National Stadium, Suva (N)	Fiji	0–2	2026 MSG Prime Minister's Cup		—	
168	30 September 2026	National Stadium, Suva (N)	Solomon Islands	1–1	2026 MSG Prime Minister's Cup		—	

Notes

1. A: Papua New Guinea played five matches at the 1984 Merdeka Tournament, however only four were against full international sides. The other match against a Minas Gerais XI is considered an unofficial match.
2. B: The 1994 Melanesia Cup doubled as qualifiers for the 1996 OFC Nations Cup.
3. C: The 1998 Melanesia Cup doubled as qualifiers for the 1998 OFC Nations Cup.
4. D: The 2000 Melanesia Cup doubled as qualifiers for the 2000 OFC Nations Cup.
5. E: The first round of Oceanian qualifiers for the 2006 FIFA World Cup doubled as qualifiers for the 2004 OFC Nations Cup.
6. F: The 2012 OFC Nations Cup doubled as the second round of qualifiers for the 2014 FIFA World Cup.
7. G: The 2016 OFC Nations Cup doubled as the second round of qualifiers for the 2018 FIFA World Cup.
8. H: Match played behind closed doors due to the COVID-19 pandemic in Asia.
9. I: Tuvalu forfeited.
10. J: Cook Islands forfeited.

== Record by opponent ==
Team	Pld	W	D	L	GF	GA	GD	WPCT
American Samoa	3	3	0	0	37	0	+37	100.00
Australia	1	0	0	1	2	11	−9	0.00
Central African Republic	1	0	0	1	0	4	−4	0.00
China	2	0	1	1	2	5	−3	0.00
Chinese Taipei	2	0	2	0	3	3	0	0.00
Cook Islands	3	3	0	0	23	1	+22	100.00
Fiji	25	5	7	13	25	46	−21	20.00
Guam	1	1	0	0	9	0	+9	100.00
Indonesia	2	1	0	1	3	8	−5	50.00
Iran	1	0	0	1	1	8	−7	0.00
Kiribati	2	2	0	0	30	1	+29	100.00
Liberia	1	1	0	0	2	1	+1	100.00
Malaysia	5	1	0	4	5	27	−22	20.00
Federated States of Micronesia	1	1	0	0	10	0	+10	100.00
New Caledonia	20	4	2	14	18	55	−37	20.00
New Zealand	6	1	1	4	3	19	−16	16.67
Niue	1	1	0	0	19	0	+19	100.00
North Korea	1	0	0	1	0	4	−4	0.00
Philippines	1	0	0	1	0	5	−5	0.00
Samoa (Note: Includes results as Western Samoa.)	6	6	0	0	28	4	+24	100.00
Singapore	3	0	1	2	7	11	−4	0.00
Solomon Islands	27	7	5	15	35	45	−10	25.93
Sri Lanka	1	0	1	0	0	0	0	0.00
Tahiti	17	1	5	11	19	50	−31	5.88
Thailand	1	1	0	0	4	1	+3	100.00
Tonga	4	3	1	0	20	2	+18	75.00
Tuvalu	1	1	0	0	3	0	+3	100.00
Vanuatu (Note: Includes results as New Hebrides.)	26	11	6	9	35	38	−3	42.31
Wallis and Futuna	3	3	0	0	16	1	+15	100.00
Total	168	57	32	79	359	350	+9	33.93

Source: Results
