= 2016 OFC Nations Cup Group A =

Group A of the 2016 OFC Nations Cup took place from 29 May to 5 June 2016. The group consisted of New Caledonia, hosts Papua New Guinea, Samoa and defending champions Tahiti.

== Teams ==
Draw position	Team	Method of qualification	Date of qualification	Finals appearance	Last appearance	Previous best performance	FIFA Rankings	
Draw position	Team	Method of qualification	Date of qualification	Finals appearance	Last appearance	Previous best performance	July 2015 (Note: The rankings of July 2015 were used for seeding for the final draw.)	May 2016
A1	Tahiti	Automatic	29 March 2014	9th	2012	Winners (2012)	188	196
A2	New Caledonia	Automatic	29 March 2014	6th	2012	Runners-up (2008, 2012)	167	191
A3	Samoa	Qualifying winner	4 September 2015	2nd	2012	Group stage (2012)	198	170
A4	Papua New Guinea (hosts)	Automatic	29 March 2014	4th	2012	Group stage (1980, 2002, 2012)	202	198

== Standings ==
Pos	Team	Pld	W	D	L	GF	GA	GD	Pts	Qualification
1	Papua New Guinea (H)	3	1	2	0	11	3	+8	5	Qualification to Nations Cup knockout stage and World Cup qualifying third round
2	New Caledonia	3	1	2	0	9	2	+7	5	Qualification to Nations Cup knockout stage and World Cup qualifying third round
3	Tahiti	3	1	2	0	7	3	+4	5	Qualification to World Cup qualifying third round
4	Samoa	3	0	0	3	0	19	−19	0	

Source: FIFA
Rules for classification: Qualification tiebreakers
(H) Hosts

In the semi-finals:

- The winners of Group A, Papua New Guinea, advanced to play the runners-up of Group B, Solomon Islands.
- The runners-up of Group A, New Caledonia, advanced to play the winners of Group B, New Zealand.

== Matches ==
=== Papua New Guinea vs New Caledonia ===
29 May 2016
16:00

Papua New Guinea	1–1	New Caledonia
Semmy 41'	Report (FIFA); Report (OFC)	Saïko 83'

Sir John Guise Stadium, Port Moresby
Attendance: 4,231
Referee: Matthew Conger (New Zealand)

Papua New Guinea	New Caledonia

Assistant referees:
Mark Rule (New Zealand)
Tevita Makasini (Tonga)
Fourth official:
Robinson Banga (Vanuatu)

=== Tahiti vs Samoa ===
29 May 2016
19:00

Tahiti	4–0	Samoa
T. Tehau 2', 5'; Chong Hue 15'; A. Tehau 39'	Report (FIFA); Report (OFC)

Sir John Guise Stadium, Port Moresby
Attendance: 4,720
Referee: Ravitesh Behari (Fiji)

Tahiti	Samoa

Assistant referees:
Ravinesh Kumar (Fiji)
Johnny Erick Niabo (Solomon Islands)
Fourth official:
George Time (Solomon Islands)

=== Papua New Guinea vs Tahiti ===
1 June 2016
16:00

Papua New Guinea	2–2	Tahiti
Gunemba 45+1', 64'	Report (FIFA); Report (OFC)	A. Tehau 66'; T. Tehau 76'

Sir John Guise Stadium, Port Moresby
Attendance: 1,643
Referee: Nick Waldron (New Zealand)

Papua New Guinea	Tahiti

Assistant referees:
Mark Rule (New Zealand)
Avinesh Narayan (Fiji)
Fourth official:
Matthew Conger (New Zealand)

=== New Caledonia vs Samoa ===
1 June 2016
19:00

New Caledonia	7–0	Samoa
Kayara 18', 30'; Nemia 28'; Zeoula 38' (pen.); Wadriako 53'; Cexome 79'; Dahité 89' (pen.)	Report (FIFA); Report (OFC)

Sir John Guise Stadium, Port Moresby
Attendance: 2,015
Referee: Robinson Banga (Vanuatu)

New Caledonia	Samoa

Assistant referees:
Ravinesh Kumar (Fiji)
Hilmon Sese (Vanuatu)
Fourth official:
Joel Hopkken (Vanuatu)

=== Samoa vs Papua New Guinea ===
5 June 2016
16:00

Samoa	0–8	Papua New Guinea
	Report (FIFA); Report (OFC)	Foster 13', 51'; Gunemba 33', 63', 85'; Dabinyaba 58', 74'; Upaiga 67'

Sir John Guise Stadium, Port Moresby
Attendance: 2,678
Referee: Joel Hopkken (Vanuatu)

Samoa	Papua New Guinea

Assistant referees:
Hilmon Sese (Vanuatu)
Johnny Erick Niabo (Solomon Islands)
Fourth official:
George Time (Solomon Islands)

=== Tahiti vs New Caledonia ===
5 June 2016
19:00

Tahiti	1–1	New Caledonia
T. Tehau 90+2'	Report (FIFA); Report (OFC)	Kaï 80'

Sir John Guise Stadium, Port Moresby
Attendance: 3,158
Referee: Nick Waldron (New Zealand)

Tahiti	New Caledonia

Assistant referees:
Tevita Makasini (Tonga)
Avinesh Narayan (Fiji)
Fourth official:
Ravitesh Behari (Fiji)
