= 2016 OFC Nations Cup Group B =

Group B of the 2016 OFC Nations Cup took place from 28 May to 4 June 2016. The group consisted of Fiji, New Zealand, Solomon Islands and Vanuatu.

== Teams ==
| Draw position | Team | Method of qualification | Date of qualification | Finals appearance | Last appearance | Previous best performance | FIFA Rankings | |
| Draw position | Team | Method of qualification | Date of qualification | Finals appearance | Last appearance | Previous best performance | July 2015 (Note: The rankings of July 2015 were used for seeding for the final draw.) | May 2016 |
|---|---|---|---|---|---|---|---|---|
| B1 | New Zealand | Automatic | 29 March 2014 | 10th | 2012 | Winners (1973, 1998, 2002, 2008) | 136 | 161 |
| B2 | Solomon Islands | Automatic | 29 March 2014 | 7th | 2012 | Runners-up (2004) | 191 | 192 |
| B3 | Fiji | Automatic | 29 March 2014 | 8th | 2012 | Third place (1998, 2008) | 199 | 183 |
| B4 | Vanuatu | Automatic | 29 March 2014 | 9th | 2012 | Fourth place (1973, 2000, 2002, 2008) | 197 | 181 |

== Standings ==
| Pos | Team | Pld | W | D | L | GF | GA | GD | Pts | Qualification |
|---|---|---|---|---|---|---|---|---|---|---|
| 1 | New Zealand | 3 | 3 | 0 | 0 | 9 | 1 | +8 | 9 | Qualification to Nations Cup knockout stage and World Cup qualifying third round |
| 2 | Solomon Islands | 3 | 1 | 0 | 2 | 1 | 2 | −1 | 3 | Qualification to Nations Cup knockout stage and World Cup qualifying third round |
| 3 | Fiji | 3 | 1 | 0 | 2 | 4 | 6 | −2 | 3 | Qualification to World Cup qualifying third round |
| 4 | Vanuatu | 3 | 1 | 0 | 2 | 3 | 8 | −5 | 3 | |

Source: FIFA
Rules for classification: Qualification tiebreakers

In the semi-finals:

- The winners of Group B, New Zealand, advanced to play the runners-up of Group A, New Caledonia.
- The runners-up of Group B, Solomon Islands, advanced to play the winners of Group A, Papua New Guinea.

== Matches ==
=== New Zealand vs Fiji ===
28 May 2016
16:00

| New Zealand | 3–1 | Fiji |
|---|---|---|
| Tzimopoulos 16'; Fallon 41'; Wood 61' (pen.) | Report (FIFA); Report (OFC) | Krishna 45+2' (pen.) |

Sir John Guise Stadium, Port Moresby
Attendance: 378
Referee: Norbert Hauata (Tahiti)

| New Zealand | Fiji |

Assistant referees:
Philippe Revel (Tahiti)
Noah Kusunan (Papua New Guinea)
Fourth official:
Amos Anio (Papua New Guinea)

=== Vanuatu vs Solomon Islands ===
28 May 2016
19:00

| Vanuatu | 0–1 | Solomon Islands |
|---|---|---|
| | Report (FIFA); Report (OFC) | Donga 19' |

Sir John Guise Stadium, Port Moresby
Attendance: 1,611
Referee: Médéric Lacour (New Caledonia)

| Vanuatu | Solomon Islands |

Assistant referees:
Folio Moeaki (Tonga)
Bertrand Brial (New Caledonia)
Fourth official:
Abdelkader Zitouni (Tahiti)

=== Vanuatu vs New Zealand ===
31 May 2016
16:00

| Vanuatu | 0–5 | New Zealand |
|---|---|---|
| | Report (FIFA); Report (OFC) | Wood 4', 5'; McGlinchey 10'; Fallon 19'; Barbarouses 45' |

Sir John Guise Stadium, Port Moresby
Attendance: 520
Referee: Amos Anio (Papua New Guinea)

| Vanuatu | New Zealand |

Assistant referees:
Norman Bafinu Sali (Papua New Guinea)
John Pareanga (Cook Islands)
Fourth official:
Norbert Hauata (Tahiti)

=== Solomon Islands vs Fiji ===
31 May 2016
19:00

| Solomon Islands | 0–1 | Fiji |
|---|---|---|
| | Report (FIFA); Report (OFC) | Krishna 85' (pen.) |

Sir John Guise Stadium, Port Moresby
Attendance: 798
Referee: Abdelkader Zitouni (Tahiti)

| Solomon Islands | Fiji |

Assistant referees:
Tevita Makasini (Tonga)
Folio Moeaki (Tonga)
Fourth official:
Médéric Lacour (New Caledonia)

=== Fiji vs Vanuatu ===
4 June 2016
16:00

| Fiji | 2–3 | Vanuatu |
|---|---|---|
| Kautoga 51'; Krishna 69' | Report (FIFA); Report (OFC) | Fred 19'; Masauvakalo 41'; Kaltak 75' (pen.) |

Sir John Guise Stadium, Port Moresby
Attendance: 851
Referee: Abdelkader Zitouni (Tahiti)

| Fiji | Vanuatu |

Assistant referees:
Bertrand Brial (New Caledonia)
John Pareanga (Cook Islands)
Fourth official:
Médéric Lacour (New Caledonia)

=== New Zealand vs Solomon Islands ===
4 June 2016
19:00

| New Zealand | 1–0 | Solomon Islands |
|---|---|---|
| Adams 80' | Report (FIFA); Report (OFC) |

Sir John Guise Stadium, Port Moresby
Attendance: 1,925
Referee: Norbert Hauata (Tahiti)

| New Zealand | Solomon Islands |

Assistant referees:
Philippe Revel (Tahiti)
Folio Moeaki (Tonga)
Fourth official:
Amos Anio (Papua New Guinea)
