= 2018 FIFA World Cup qualification – OFC third round =

Football tournament qualification stage

The third round of OFC matches for 2018 FIFA World Cup qualification began on 7 November 2016 and ended on 5 September 2017.

== Format ==
A total of six teams which had advanced from the OFC Nations Cup (second round) were drawn into two groups of three teams to play home-and-away round-robin matches. The winners of each group advanced to the OFC Final, played home-and-away over two legs, and the winners of the final advanced to the inter-confederation play-offs.

== Qualified teams ==
Group (Nations Cup)	Winners	Runners-up	Third-placed teams
A	Papua New Guinea	New Caledonia	Tahiti
B	New Zealand	Solomon Islands	Fiji

== Seeding ==
The draw for the third round was held on 8 July 2016, 11:00 NZST (UTC+12), at the OFC headquarters in Auckland, New Zealand.

The seeding was based on the results of the 2016 OFC Nations Cup (second round):

- The OFC Nations Cup champions (New Zealand) and runners-up (Papua New Guinea) were seeded as A1 and B1 respectively.
- Pot 1 contained the OFC Nations Cup losing semi-finalists (New Caledonia and Solomon Islands).
- Pot 2 contained the third-placed teams of the OFC Nations Cup group stage (Fiji and Tahiti).

Each group contained a seeded team, a team from Pot 1, and a team from Pot 2. The same group compositions as the OFC Nations Cup were not allowed by the draw (i.e., Papua New Guinea, New Caledonia and Tahiti in one group, New Zealand, Solomon Islands and Fiji in the other group). The fixtures of each group were confirmed by the OFC after the draw, taking into account the need for New Zealand to have a bye in June 2017 for playing in the 2017 FIFA Confederations Cup, and Papua New Guinea to have a bye in November 2016 for hosting the 2016 FIFA U-20 Women's World Cup.

Note: Bolded teams qualified for the inter-confederation play-offs. Italicised teams qualified for the OFC final but lost.

Seeded teams	Pot 1	Pot 2
**New Zealand** (assigned to A1); Papua New Guinea (assigned to B1)	New Caledonia; Solomon Islands	Fiji; Tahiti

== Group stage ==
2018 FIFA World Cup qualification tiebreakers
In league format, the ranking of teams in each group was based on the following criteria (regulations Articles 20.6 and 20.7):
1. Points (3 points for a win, 1 point for a draw, 0 points for a loss)
2. Overall goal difference
3. Overall goals scored
4. Points in matches between tied teams
5. Goal difference in matches between tied teams
6. Goals scored in matches between tied teams
7. Away goals scored in matches between tied teams (if the tie was only between two teams in home-and-away league format)
8. Fair play points
  - first yellow card: minus 1 point
  - indirect red card (second yellow card): minus 3 points
  - direct red card: minus 4 points
  - yellow card and direct red card: minus 5 points
9. Drawing of lots by the FIFA Organising Committee

=== Group A ===
Pos	Team	Pld	W	D	L	GF	GA	GD	Pts	Qualification	(New Zealand)	(New Caledonia)	(Fiji)
1	New Zealand	4	3	1	0	6	0	+6	10	Advance to OFC Final	—	2–0	2–0
2	New Caledonia	4	1	2	1	4	5	−1	5		0–0	—	2–1
3	Fiji	4	0	1	3	3	8	−5	1		0–2	2–2	—

Source: FIFA
Rules for classification: Qualification tiebreakers
12 November 2016
15:00 UTC+13

New Zealand	2–0	New Caledonia
Rojas 42', 72'	Report (FIFA); Report (OFC)

QBE Stadium, Auckland
Attendance: 8,131
Referee: Norbert Hauata (Tahiti)

15 November 2016
17:00 UTC+11

New Caledonia	0–0	New Zealand
	Report (FIFA); Report (OFC)

Stade Yoshida, Koné
Attendance: 2,000
Referee: George Time (Solomon Islands)

25 March 2017
13:00 UTC+12

Fiji	0–2	New Zealand
	Report (FIFA); Report (OFC)	Wood 48' (pen.); Rojas 55'

Churchill Park, Lautoka
Attendance: 7,000
Referee: Norbert Hauata (Tahiti)

28 March 2017
19:35 UTC+13

New Zealand	2–0	Fiji
Thomas 27', 68'	Report (FIFA); Report (OFC)

Westpac Stadium, Wellington
Attendance: 10,133
Referee: Kader Zitouni (Tahiti)

7 June 2017
16:00 UTC+12

Fiji	2–2	New Caledonia
Waqa 45+2'; Krishna 54'	Report (FIFA); Report (OFC)	Wamowe 13', 24'

Churchill Park, Lautoka
Attendance: 1,500
Referee: Kader Zitouni (Tahiti)

11 June 2017
17:00 UTC+11

New Caledonia	2–1	Fiji
Ounei 43' (pen.); Sele 73'	Report (FIFA); Report (OFC)	Saukuru 66'

Stade Numa-Daly Magenta, Nouméa
Attendance: 1,050
Referee: Norbert Hauata (Tahiti)

=== Group B ===
Pos	Team	Pld	W	D	L	GF	GA	GD	Pts	Qualification	(Solomon Islands)	(French Polynesia)	(Papua New Guinea)
1	Solomon Islands	4	3	0	1	6	6	0	9	Advance to OFC Final	—	1–0	3–2
2	Tahiti	4	2	0	2	7	4	+3	6		3–0 (Note: FIFA awarded Tahiti a 3–0 win as a result of the Solomon Islands fielding the ineligible player Henry Fa'arodo, after Tahiti had defeated the Solomon Islands 1–0. Fa'arodo failed to serve a one-game ban after receiving two yellow cards in the 2016 OFC Nations Cup.)	—	1–2
3	Papua New Guinea	4	1	0	3	6	9	−3	3		1–2	1–3	—

Source: FIFA
Rules for classification: Qualification tiebreakers
Notes:
7 November 2016
19:00 UTC–10

Tahiti	3–0 Awarded (Note: FIFA awarded Tahiti a 3–0 win as a result of the Solomon Islands fielding the ineligible player Henry Fa'arodo, after Tahiti had defeated the Solomon Islands 1–0. Henry Fa'arodo failed to serve a one-game ban after receiving two yellow cards in the 2016 OFC Nations Cup.)	Solomon Islands
Keck 53'	Report (FIFA); Report (OFC)

Stade Pater, Pirae
Attendance: 2,200
Referee: Médéric Lacour (New Caledonia)

13 November 2016
15:00 UTC+11

Solomon Islands	1–0	Tahiti
Poila 90+3'	Report (FIFA); Report (OFC)

Lawson Tama Stadium, Honiara
Attendance: 5,000
Referee: Matthew Conger (New Zealand)

23 March 2017
16:00 UTC+10

Papua New Guinea	1–3	Tahiti
Dabinyaba 45+1'	Report (FIFA); Report (OFC)	Graglia 59', 85'; T. Tehau 90+4'

Sir John Guise Stadium, Port Moresby
Attendance: 4,209
Referee: Salesh Chand (Fiji)

28 March 2017
19:00 UTC–10

Tahiti	1–2	Papua New Guinea
Keck 90+3'	Report (FIFA); Report (OFC)	Aisa 62'; Gunemba 74'

Stade Pater, Pirae
Attendance: 5,000
Referee: Matthew Conger (New Zealand)

9 June 2017
15:00 UTC+11

Solomon Islands	3–2	Papua New Guinea
Kaua 12'; Totori 37'; Lea'alafa 74'	Report (FIFA); Report (OFC)	Foster 48'; Aisa 61'

Lawson Tama Stadium, Honiara
Attendance: 14,700
Referee: Jarred Gillett (Australia)

13 June 2017
17:00 UTC+10

Papua New Guinea	1–2	Solomon Islands
Gunemba 18'	Report (FIFA); Report (OFC)	Fa'arodo 33' (pen.); Donga 45+2'

PNG Football Stadium, Port Moresby
Attendance: 2,035
Referee: Jumpei Iida (Japan)

== Final ==
The draw for the final (which decided the order of legs) was held on 15 June 2017, 16:00 NZST (UTC+12), at the OFC headquarters in Auckland, New Zealand.

The winners of the final advanced to inter-confederation play-offs. Dates were set for the two-legged final as being on 1 and 5 September 2017.

Team 1	Agg.	Team 2	1st leg	2nd leg
New Zealand	8–3	Solomon Islands	6–1	2–2

1 September 2017
19:35 UTC+12

New Zealand	6–1	Solomon Islands
Wood 18', 36', 90+3'; Barbarouses 39'; Thomas 56'; McGlinchey 81'	Report (FIFA); Report (OFC)	Fa'arodo 53' (pen.)

North Harbour Stadium, Auckland
Attendance: 10,230
Referee: Norbert Hauata (Tahiti)
5 September 2017
14:00 UTC+11

Solomon Islands	2–2	New Zealand
Lea'alafa 28' (pen.); Fa'arodo 78' (pen.)	Report (FIFA); Report (OFC)	Bevan 14'; Sale 21' (o.g.)

Lawson Tama Stadium, Honiara
Attendance: 10,200
Referee: Abdulrahman Al-Jassim (Qatar)

New Zealand won 8–3 on aggregate and advanced to the inter-confederation play-offs.

== Goalscorers ==
There were 41 goals scored in 14 matches, for an average of 2.93 goals per match.

4 goals

- (New Zealand) Chris Wood

3 goals

- (New Zealand) Marco Rojas
- (New Zealand) Ryan Thomas
- (Solomon Islands) Henry Fa'arodo

2 goals

- (New Caledonia) Mone Wamowe
- (Papua New Guinea) Patrick Aisa
- (Papua New Guinea) Raymond Gunemba
- (Solomon Islands) Micah Lea'alafa
- (French Polynesia) Sylvain Graglia
- (French Polynesia) Tauhiti Keck

1 goal

- (Fiji) Roy Krishna
- (Fiji) Epeli Saukuru
- (Fiji) Saula Waqa
- (New Caledonia) Emile Ounei
- (New Caledonia) Richard Sele
- (New Zealand) Kosta Barbarouses
- (New Zealand) Myer Bevan
- (New Zealand) Michael McGlinchey
- (Papua New Guinea) Nigel Dabinyaba
- (Papua New Guinea) Michael Foster
- (Solomon Islands) Jerry Donga
- (Solomon Islands) Atkin Kaua
- (Solomon Islands) Emmanuel Poila
- (Solomon Islands) Benjamin Totori
- (French Polynesia) Teaonui Tehau

1 own goal

- (Solomon Islands) Hadisi Aengari (against New Zealand)
