= 2018 FIFA World Cup qualification (OFC) =

Tournament details
- Dates: 31 August 2015 – 5 September 2017
- Teams: 11 (from 1 confederation)

Tournament statistics
- Matches played: 35
- Goals scored: 106 (3.03 per match)
- Attendance: 127,093 (3,631 per match)
- Top scorer: (New Zealand) Chris Wood (8 goals)

The Oceanian section of the 2018 FIFA World Cup qualification acted as qualifiers for the 2018 FIFA World Cup, to be held in Russia, for national teams which are members of the Oceania Football Confederation (OFC). A total of 0.5 slots (i.e. 1 inter-confederation play-off slot) in the final tournament was available for OFC teams.

The 2016 edition of the OFC Nations Cup once again doubled as the second round of the OFC qualifying competition for the 2018 FIFA World Cup (similar to the 2012 OFC Nations Cup and the OFC qualifying competition for the 2014 FIFA World Cup). Unlike in 2012, however, the team that won the qualifying competition and advanced to the intercontinental play-off, New Zealand, was the same team that also won the OFC Nations Cup and represented the OFC at the 2017 FIFA Confederations Cup.

== Format ==
The qualification structure was as follows:

- First round: Four teams (American Samoa, Cook Islands, Samoa, and Tonga) played a round-robin tournament at a single country. The winner advanced to the second round.
- Second round (2016 OFC Nations Cup): Eight teams (Fiji, New Caledonia, New Zealand, Papua New Guinea, Solomon Islands, Tahiti, Vanuatu, and the first round winner) played the tournament at a single country. For the group stage, they were divided into two groups of four teams. The top three teams of each group advanced to the third round.
- Third round: Six teams which had advanced from the second round were divided into two groups of three teams to play home-and-away round-robin matches. The two group winners met in a two-legged match with the winner advancing to the inter-confederation play-offs.

The OFC had considered different proposals of the qualifying tournament. A previous proposal adopted by the OFC in October 2014 had the eight teams divided into two groups of four teams to play home-and-away round-robin matches in the second round, followed by the top two teams of each group advancing to the third round to play in a single group of home-and-away round-robin matches to decide the winner of the 2016 OFC Nations Cup which would both qualify to the 2017 FIFA Confederations Cup and advance to the inter-confederation play-offs. However, it was later reported in April 2015 that the OFC had reversed its decision, and the 2016 OFC Nations Cup will be played as a one-off tournament similar to the 2012 OFC Nations Cup.

== Entrants ==
All 11 FIFA-affiliated national teams from the OFC entered qualification. The four lowest ranked teams (based on FIFA World Ranking and sporting reasons) entered the first round, while the other seven teams entered the second round.

Bye to second round	Competing in first round
Fiji; New Caledonia; New Zealand; Papua New Guinea; Solomon Islands; Tahiti; Vanuatu	American Samoa; Cook Islands; Samoa; Tonga

== Schedule ==
The schedule of the competition was as follows.

Round	Matchday	Date
First round	Matchday 1	31 August 2015
First round	Matchday 2	2 September 2015
First round	Matchday 3	4 September 2015
Second round (OFC Nations Cup)	Matchday 1	28–29 May 2016
Second round (OFC Nations Cup)	Matchday 2	31 May – 1 June 2016
Second round (OFC Nations Cup)	Matchday 3	4–5 June 2016
Second round (OFC Nations Cup)	Semi-finals	8 June 2016
Second round (OFC Nations Cup)	Final	11 June 2016

Round	Matchday	Date
Third round	Matchday 1	7–15 November 2016
Third round	Matchday 2	7–15 November 2016
Third round	Matchday 3	20–28 March 2017
Third round	Matchday 4	20–28 March 2017
Third round	Matchday 5	5–13 June 2017
Third round	Matchday 6	5–13 June 2017
Third round	Final first leg	28 August – 5 September 2017
Third round	Final second leg	28 August – 5 September 2017

The inter-confederation play-offs were scheduled to be played between 6–14 November 2017.

== First round ==
The match schedule was revealed on 30 July 2015, following a draw held at OFC Headquarters in Auckland, New Zealand.

2018 FIFA World Cup qualification tiebreakers
In league format, the ranking of teams in each group was based on the following criteria (regulations Articles 20.6 and 20.7):
1. Points (3 points for a win, 1 point for a draw, 0 points for a loss)
2. Overall goal difference
3. Overall goals scored
4. Points in matches between tied teams
5. Goal difference in matches between tied teams
6. Goals scored in matches between tied teams
7. Away goals scored in matches between tied teams (if the tie was only between two teams in home-and-away league format)
8. Fair play points
  - first yellow card: minus 1 point
  - indirect red card (second yellow card): minus 3 points
  - direct red card: minus 4 points
  - yellow card and direct red card: minus 5 points
9. Drawing of lots by the FIFA Organising Committee

Pos	Team	Pld	W	D	L	GF	GA	GD	Pts	Qualification	Samoa	American Samoa	Cook Islands	Tonga
1	Samoa	3	2	0	1	6	3	+3	6	Advance to 2016 OFC Nations Cup and second round	—	3–2	—	—
2	American Samoa	3	2	0	1	6	4	+2	6		—	—	2–0	2–1
3	Cook Islands	3	2	0	1	4	2	+2	6		1–0	—	—	3–0
4	Tonga (H)	3	0	0	3	1	8	−7	0		0–3	—	—	—

Source: FIFA
(H) Hosts

== Second round ==
The draw for the second round was held as part of the 2018 FIFA World Cup Preliminary Draw on 25 July 2015, starting 18:00 MSK (UTC+3), at the Konstantinovsky Palace in Strelna, Saint Petersburg, Russia.

=== Group stage ===
2018 FIFA World Cup qualification tiebreakers
In league format, the ranking of teams in each group was based on the following criteria (regulations Articles 20.6 and 20.7):
1. Points (3 points for a win, 1 point for a draw, 0 points for a loss)
2. Overall goal difference
3. Overall goals scored
4. Points in matches between tied teams
5. Goal difference in matches between tied teams
6. Goals scored in matches between tied teams
7. Away goals scored in matches between tied teams (if the tie was only between two teams in home-and-away league format)
8. Fair play points
  - first yellow card: minus 1 point
  - indirect red card (second yellow card): minus 3 points
  - direct red card: minus 4 points
  - yellow card and direct red card: minus 5 points
9. Drawing of lots by the FIFA Organising Committee

==== Group A ====
Pos	Team	Pld	W	D	L	GF	GA	GD	Pts	Qualification	(Papua New Guinea)	(New Caledonia)	(French Polynesia)	(Samoa)
1	Papua New Guinea (H)	3	1	2	0	11	3	+8	5	Qualification to Nations Cup knockout stage and World Cup qualifying third round	—	1–1	2–2	—
2	New Caledonia	3	1	2	0	9	2	+7	5	Qualification to Nations Cup knockout stage and World Cup qualifying third round	—	—	—	7–0
3	Tahiti	3	1	2	0	7	3	+4	5	Qualification to World Cup qualifying third round	—	1–1	—	4–0
4	Samoa	3	0	0	3	0	19	−19	0		0–8	—	—	—

Source: FIFA
(H) Hosts

==== Group B ====
Pos	Team	Pld	W	D	L	GF	GA	GD	Pts	Qualification	(New Zealand)	(Solomon Islands)	(Fiji)	(Vanuatu)
1	New Zealand	3	3	0	0	9	1	+8	9	Qualification to Nations Cup knockout stage and World Cup qualifying third round	—	1–0	3–1	—
2	Solomon Islands	3	1	0	2	1	2	−1	3	Qualification to Nations Cup knockout stage and World Cup qualifying third round	—	—	0–1	—
3	Fiji	3	1	0	2	4	6	−2	3	Qualification to World Cup qualifying third round	—	—	—	2–3
4	Vanuatu	3	1	0	2	3	8	−5	3		0–5	0–1	—	—

Source: FIFA

=== Knockout stage ===
While the results of the OFC Nations Cup knockout stage matches have no effect on the teams qualified for the third round of World Cup qualifying, for statistical purposes these matches are considered part of World Cup qualifying, with FIFA counting goalscorers in the qualifying statistics, and cards given may contribute to suspensions in the third round of World Cup qualifying (similar to the setup for 2014 World Cup qualifying).

Semi-finals
8 June – Port Moresby
New Zealand	1
New Caledonia	0
8 June – Port Moresby
Papua New Guinea	2
Solomon Islands	1

Final
11 June – Port Moresby
New Zealand (p)	0 (4)
Papua New Guinea	0 (2)

== Third round ==
The draw for the third round was held on 8 July 2016, 11:00 NZST (UTC+12), at the OFC headquarters in Auckland, New Zealand.

=== Groups ===
2018 FIFA World Cup qualification tiebreakers
In league format, the ranking of teams in each group was based on the following criteria (regulations Articles 20.6 and 20.7):
1. Points (3 points for a win, 1 point for a draw, 0 points for a loss)
2. Overall goal difference
3. Overall goals scored
4. Points in matches between tied teams
5. Goal difference in matches between tied teams
6. Goals scored in matches between tied teams
7. Away goals scored in matches between tied teams (if the tie was only between two teams in home-and-away league format)
8. Fair play points
  - first yellow card: minus 1 point
  - indirect red card (second yellow card): minus 3 points
  - direct red card: minus 4 points
  - yellow card and direct red card: minus 5 points
9. Drawing of lots by the FIFA Organising Committee

==== Group A ====
Pos	Team	Pld	W	D	L	GF	GA	GD	Pts	Qualification	(New Zealand)	(New Caledonia)	(Fiji)
1	New Zealand	4	3	1	0	6	0	+6	10	Advance to OFC Final	—	2–0	2–0
2	New Caledonia	4	1	2	1	4	5	−1	5		0–0	—	2–1
3	Fiji	4	0	1	3	3	8	−5	1		0–2	2–2	—

Source: FIFA

==== Group B ====
Pos	Team	Pld	W	D	L	GF	GA	GD	Pts	Qualification	(Solomon Islands)	(French Polynesia)	(Papua New Guinea)
1	Solomon Islands	4	3	0	1	6	6	0	9	Advance to OFC Final	—	1–0	3–2
2	Tahiti	4	2	0	2	7	4	+3	6		3–0 (Note: FIFA awarded Tahiti a 3–0 win as a result of the Solomon Islands fielding the ineligible player Henry Fa'arodo, after Tahiti had defeated the Solomon Islands 1–0. Fa'arodo failed to serve a one-game ban after receiving two yellow cards in the 2016 OFC Nations Cup.)	—	1–2
3	Papua New Guinea	4	1	0	3	6	9	−3	3		1–2	1–3	—

Source: FIFA

=== Final ===
The draw for the final (which decided the order of legs) was held on 15 June 2017, 16:00 NZST (UTC+12), at the OFC headquarters in Auckland, New Zealand.

The winner of the final advanced to inter-confederation play-offs. Dates were set for the two-legged final as being between 28 August and 5 September 2017.

Team 1	Agg.	Team 2	1st leg	2nd leg
New Zealand	8–3	Solomon Islands	6–1	2–2

New Zealand defeated Solomon Islands 8-3 on aggregate and advanced to the OFC-CONMEBOL play-off

== Inter-confederation play-offs ==
The draw for the inter-confederation play-offs was held as part of the 2018 FIFA World Cup Preliminary Draw on 25 July 2015, starting 18:00 MSK (UTC+3), at the Konstantinovsky Palace in Strelna, Saint Petersburg. The first-placed team from OFC was drawn against the fifth-placed team from CONMEBOL, with the OFC team hosting the first leg.

Team 1	Agg.	Team 2	1st leg	2nd leg
New Zealand	0–2	Peru	0–0	0–2

== Top goalscorers ==
There were 106 goals scored in 35 matches, for an average of 3.03 goals per match.

8 goals

- (New Zealand) Chris Wood

7 goals

- (Papua New Guinea) Raymond Gunemba

5 goals

- (French Polynesia) Teaonui Tehau

4 goals

- (Cook Islands) Taylor Saghabi
- (Fiji) Roy Krishna
- (Papua New Guinea) Nigel Dabinyaba
- (Papua New Guinea) Michael Foster

3 goals

- (New Zealand) Marco Rojas
- (New Zealand) Ryan Thomas
- (Solomon Islands) Henry Fa'arodo

Below are full goalscorer lists for each round:

- First round
- Second round
- Third round
