= Emmanuel Poila =

Solomon Islands footballer (born 1990)

Personal information
- Full name: Emmanuel Poila
- Date of birth: 16 July 1990 (age 36)
- Place of birth: Solomon Islands
- Position: Defender

Team information
- Current team: Solomon Warriors

Senior career*
Years	Team	Apps	(Gls)
2009–2011	Marist Fire		
2011–2014	Solomon Warriors		
2014–2015	Hekari United		
2015–	Solomon Warriors		

International career
2012	Solomon Islands U23	3	(0)
2012–2019	Solomon Islands	23	(1)
Medal record
Men's football
Representing Solomon Islands
Pacific Mini Games
Bronze medal – third place	2017 Vanuatu
- * Club domestic league appearances and goals as of 2 November 2016

Emmanuel Poila (born 16 July 1990) is a Solomon Islands footballer who plays as a defender for Solomon Warriors. He made his debut for the national team on September 7, 2012, in a 2-0 win against Tahiti.

== International ==
Poila was named in the Solomon Islands national squad for the first time for the 2012 OFC Nations Cup but he didn't made the final squad. He made his debut two months later in a match against Tahiti.

== Career statistics ==
=== International ===
Appearances and goals by national team and year
National team	Year	Apps	Goals
Solomon Islands	2012	3	0
Solomon Islands	2013	–	
Solomon Islands	2014	–	
Solomon Islands	2015	–	
Solomon Islands	2016	4	1
Solomon Islands	2017	8	0
Solomon Islands	2018	2	0
Solomon Islands	2019	6	0
Total		23	1

Scores and results list the Solomon Islands' goal tally first, score column indicates score after each Poila goal.

List of international goals scored by Emmanuel Poila
No.	Date	Venue	Opponent	Score	Result	Competition
1	13 November 2016	Lawson Tama Stadium, Honiara, Solomon Islands	Tahiti	1–0	1–0	2018 FIFA World Cup qualification

== Honours ==
Solomon Islands

- Pacific Mini Games: Bronze Medalist, 2017
