= Emile Ounei =

New Caledonian footballer (born 1996)

Personal information
- Full name: Emile Albon Jalim Ounei
- Date of birth: 30 January 1996 (age 30)
- Place of birth: New Caledonia
- Position: Forward

Team information
- Current team: Magenta

Senior career*
Years	Team	Apps	(Gls)
2017–2018	Tiga Sport		
2018–	Magenta		

International career^{‡}
2017–	New Caledonia	3	(2)
- * Club domestic league appearances and goals as of 11:27, 25 April 2018 (UTC) ‡ National team caps and goals as of 11:27, 25 April 2018 (UTC)

Emile Ounei (born 30 January 1996), is a New Caledonian international footballer who plays as a forward for Magenta.

== International career ==
Ounei marked his international debut with a penalty goal in a 2–1 win against Fiji. In November 2016 Ounei scored the equalizer in a 1-1 draw in an international friendly against Estonia.

== Career statistics ==
=== International ===
As of matches played 25 April 2018.

National team	Year	Apps	Goals
New Caledonia	2017	2	2
New Caledonia	2018	1	0
Total		3	2

=== International goals ===
Scores and results list New Caledonia's goal tally first.

No	Date	Venue	Opponent	Score	Result	Competition
1.	11 June 2017	Stade Numa-Daly Magenta, Nouméa, New Caledonia	Fiji	1–0	2–1	2018 FIFA World Cup qualification
2.	26 November 2017	Stade Numa-Daly Magenta, Nouméa, New Caledonia	Estonia	1–1	1–1	Friendly
