= Jean-Brice Wadriako =

New Caledonian footballer (born 1993)

Personal information
- Full name: Jean-Brice Huta Wadriako
- Date of birth: 15 February 1993 (age 33)
- Place of birth: New Caledonia
- Height: 1.81 m (5 ft 11 in)
- Position: Defender

Team information
- Current team: AS Magenta
- Number: 23

Senior career*
Years	Team	Apps	(Gls)
2014–	AS Magenta		

International career^{‡}
2013	New Caledonia U20	4	(2)
2015	New Caledonia U23	2	(0)
2016–	New Caledonia	6	(1)
- * Club domestic league appearances and goals as of 01:51, 2 June 2016 (UTC) ‡ National team caps and goals as of 01:51, 2 June 2017 (UTC)

Jean-Brice Wadriako (born 15 February 1993) is a New Caledonian footballer who plays for AS Magenta.

== International career ==
=== International goals ===
Scores and results list New Caledonia's goal tally first.

No	Date	Venue	Opponent	Score	Result	Competition
1.	1 June 2016	Sir John Guise Stadium, Port Moresby, Papua New Guinea	Samoa	5–0	7–0	2016 OFC Nations Cup

== Honours ==
AS Magenta

Winner

- New Caledonia Super Ligue (2): 2014, 2015
