= Epeli Saukuru =

Fijian footballer (born 1988)

Personal information
- Date of birth: 4 August 1988 (age 38)
- Place of birth: Fiji
- Position: Midfielder

Team information
- Current team: Rewa
- Number: 14

Senior career*
Years	Team	Apps	(Gls)
2008–2010	Ba		
2011–2018	Rewa		
2018–2018	Lautoka		
2018–	Rewa		

International career^{‡}
2017–	Fiji	7	(2)
- Fiji (beach soccer)
Medal record
Men's football
Representing Fiji
Pacific Mini Games
Silver medal – second place	2017 Vanuatu
- * Club domestic league appearances and goals as of 17 January 2018 ‡ National team caps and goals as of 30 September 2017

Epeli Saukuru (born 4 August 1988) is a Fijian professional footballer who plays as a midfielder for Rewa, the Fiji national football team and the Fiji national beach soccer team.

== Club career ==
Saukuru started his career with Nadroga, but in June 2008 transferred to Navua for a $10,000 fee. In 2009 he had planned to stay with Navua, but was exchanged with Rewa a month later. In May 2010 he was suspended for two matches and fined after being red carded for dangerous tackling during a match against Suva.

In January 2018 he moved to Lautoka to play with them in the 2018 OFC Champions League. and later than year, he returned to Rewa.

== International career ==
Saukuru made his international debut for the Fiji on 25 March 2017. In a 2–0 defeat against New Zealand he played the whole match. Saukuru has scored two goals: in a 1–1 draw against the Solomon Islands and in a 2–1 loss against New Caledonia.

== Personal life ==
Saukuru has a younger brother, Iosefo Verevou, who is also a football player.

== Honours ==
Fiji

- Pacific Mini Games: Silver Medalist, 2017
