= Flemming Serritslev =

Danish footballer, coach, and manager (born 1947)

Personal information
- Full name: Flemming Serritslev
- Date of birth: 18 February 1947 (age 79)
- Place of birth: Copenhagen, Denmark
- Position: Midfielder

Team information
- Current team: fiji

Senior career*
Years	Team	Apps	(Gls)
1966–1977	Vejle Boldklub	267	(9)
1978–1980	Kolding IF	30	(2)

International career
1970–1976	Denmark	3	(0)

Managerial career
- 1981–1985: Ikast fS
- 1986: Kolding IF
- 1987–1992: B 1909
- 1992–2000: Denmark (assistant)
- 2000–2006: Denmark U-21
- 2006: Vejle BK (sporting director)
- 2008–2009: Nasarawa United
- 2009–2010: Armenia U-21
- 2010–2012: Mes Kerman (technical director)
- 2010–2011: Mes Kerman B
- 2011: Mes Kerman (caretaker)
- 2015–2018: Papua New Guinea
- 2020–2024: Fiji
Medal record
Men's football
Representing Papua New Guinea (as manager)
OFC Nations Cup
Runner-up	2016
Representing Fiji (as manager)
MSG Prime Minister's Cup
Third place	2022 Vanuatu
- * Club domestic league appearances and goals

Flemming Serritslev (born 18 February 1947) is a Danish footballer, coach and manager who is the former head coach of the Fiji national team.

== Biography ==
Serritslev played most of his career for Vejle Boldklub in a successful period. Thus, Serritslev was part of a team that won the Danish championship in 1972 and the Danish Cup in 1972, 1975 and 1977.

As manager Flemming Serritslev ensured Danish side B1909 a place in the best Danish league in 1990. In 1992, he became assistant manager of the Danish national team before he went on to become head coach of the Danish U21 team. In 2006 Serritslev returned to his childhood club Vejle as sports manager. However, Serritslev and the new board at the club could not work together and Serritslev left Vejle Boldklub only six-month after his appointment.

On 1 July 2010, he was appointed as technical manager of Mes Kerman in Iran Pro League and also head coach of Mes B. On 25 August 2011, after the resignation of Mes head coach Samad Marfavi, he was appointed as caretaker manager of club but was replaced with Miroslav Blažević without managing team in any match.

On 23 November 2015, he became new manager of the Papua New Guinea national football team. On 5 June 2016, he guided Papua New Guinea to the semi-finals of the OFC Nations Cup for the first time. Papua New Guinea beat Solomon Islands 2–1, before losing the final to New Zealand in a penalty shoot-out.

== Honours ==
=== Manager ===
Papua New Guinea

- OFC Nations Cup: Runner-up, 2016

Fiji

- MSG Prime Minister's Cup: 3rd place, 2022

== Managerial statistics ==
As of Match played 28 March 2022

Team	From	To	Record				
Team	From	To	G	W	D	L	Win %
Papua New Guinea	23 November 2015	31 January 2018	12	4	3	5	33.33
Fiji	22 January 2020	31 December 2022	5	3	0	2	60.00
