= Kip Colvey =

New Zealand footballer (born 1994)

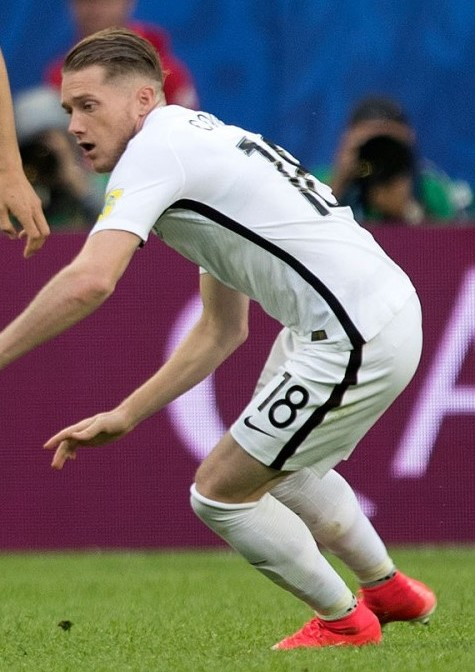
- Colvey with New Zealand in 2017

Personal information
- Full name: Kip Warren Colvey II
- Date of birth: 15 March 1994 (age 32)
- Place of birth: Lihue, Hawaii, United States
- Height: 1.78 m (5 ft 10 in)
- Position: Left-back

Youth career
- 2007–2010: Canterbury United
- 2010–2012: Asia-Pacific Football Academy

College career
Years	Team	Apps	(Gls)
2012–2015	Cal Poly Mustangs	74	(4)

Senior career*
Years	Team	Apps	(Gls)
2012	Bay Area Ambassadors		
2013–2014	Ventura County Fusion	24	(3)
2016–2017	San Jose Earthquakes	4	(0)
2016	→ Sacramento Republic (loan)	6	(0)
2017	→ Reno 1868 (loan)	10	(0)
2018	Colorado Rapids	3	(0)
2018	→ Colorado Springs Switchbacks (loan)	3	(0)

International career^{‡}
- New Zealand U17
2015	New Zealand U23	2	(0)
2016–2018	New Zealand	15	(0)
Medal record
Men's football
Representing New Zealand
OFC Nations Cup
Winner	2016 Papua New Guinea
- * Club domestic league appearances and goals as of 09:00, 16 October 2018 (UTC) ‡ National team caps and goals as of 18:03, 27 November 2017 (UTC)

Kip Warren Colvey II (born 15 March 1994) is a former professional footballer. He last played for Colorado Rapids in Major League Soccer. Born in the United States, he made 15 appearances the New Zealand national team.

== Early life ==
Colvey was born in Hawaii, but grew up in the Marlborough Sounds in New Zealand. He was educated at Nelson College and played senior football for the Nelson Suburbs club, before moving to Christchurch where he attended the Asia–Pacific Football Academy.

== Club career ==
=== College and amateur ===
Colvey spent all four years of his college career at California Polytechnic State University between 2012 and 2015. Colvey also spent the 2013 and 2014 seasons with the Ventura County Fusion of the Premier Development League. In 2013, he scored one goal in twelve league matches while scoring two goals in twelve appearances in 2014.

=== Professional ===
On 19 January 2016, Colvey was drafted 49th overall in the 2016 MLS SuperDraft by San Jose Earthquakes. Kip got his first start of the season on 13 March 2016 against the Portland Timbers and played the full 90 minutes. He signed with the club on 4 March 2016 and earned honors as SBI MLS Rookie of the Week on 14 March 2016.

On 2 April 2017, he played the first match for Reno 1868 FC.

Colvey was released by San Jose on 27 November 2017. Two weeks later he was selected by the Colorado Rapids in the league's 2017 waiver draft, reuniting him with Anthony Hudson, his former international manager.

In July 2018, Colvey was loaned to Colorado Springs Switchbacks FC.

Following his release by Colorado at the end of their 2018 season, Colvey announced his decision to retire from playing professional football, choosing to pursue a career as a physician assistant for better financial security and long-term stability.

== International career ==
On 12 May 2016, Colvey was named in the 23-man squad for the All Whites for the 2016 OFC Nations Cup. Colvey made his debut for the senior New Zealand national football team in a 2016 OFC Nations Cup 3–1 win over Fiji.

== Honours ==
New Zealand

- OFC Nations Cup: 2016
