= Luke Adams (footballer) =

New Zealand international footballer (born 1994)

Personal information
- Full name: Luke Anthony Adams
- Date of birth: 8 May 1994 (age 32)
- Place of birth: Melbourne, Australia
- Height: 1.85 m (6 ft 1 in)
- Position: Centre back

Team information
- Current team: Green Gully
- Number: 5

Youth career
- –2009: Waitakere United
- 2012–2013: Derby County

Senior career*
| Years | Team | Apps | (Gls) |
| 2009–2012 | Waitakere United | 12 | (0) |
| 2013–2014 | Wellington Phoenix | 3 | (0) |
| 2014–2015 | Waitakere United | 1 | (0) |
| 2015–2016 | South Melbourne | 43 | (3) |
| 2016–2017 | Eastern Suburbs | 8 | (1) |
| 2017 | South Melbourne | 27 | (1) |
| 2018 | Ljungskile SK | 0 | (0) |
| 2018–2021 | South Melbourne | 42 | (1) |
| 2022– | Green Gully | 25 | (2) |

International career^{‡}
| 2011 | New Zealand U17 | 4 | (0) |
| 2013–2014 | New Zealand U20 | | |
| 2015 | New Zealand U23 | 3 | (0) |
| 2016 | New Zealand | 5 | (1) |
- * Club domestic league appearances and goals as of 3 November 2022 ‡ National team caps and goals as of 4 June 2016

Luke Anthony Adams (born 8 May 1994) is a New Zealand international footballer who plays as a defender.

== Career ==
In 2012, Adams joined the English club Derby County F.C. on a one-year contract. In 2013, Adams signed a one-year contract with Wellington Phoenix. In May 2014, Adams was called into the All Whites squad for a 30 May friendly in Auckland against South Africa by interim coach Neil Emblen. In September 2014, Adams returned to Waitakere United. In January 2015, Adams signed with Australian football club South Melbourne FC.

In December 2017, Adams signed with Ljungskile SK in Division 1 Södra, the Swedish third tier. He left the club after only a few months, for personal reasons, failing to make a single league appearance.

== International career ==
After representing various New Zealand youth teams, including at the 2011 U-17 World Cup and the 2013 U-20 World Cup, Adams was a member of the New Zealand U-23s squad at the 2015 Pacific Games.

He made his debut for the senior New Zealand national football team in a 2016 OFC Nations Cup 3–1 win over Fiji.

In June 2016, Adams scored the winner in a 1–0 win over the Solomon Islands. The match was a World Cup qualifier.

== Career statistics ==
=== International goals ===
As of match played 4 June 2016. New Zealand score listed first, score column indicates score after each Adams goal.

International goals by date, venue, cap, opponent, score, result and competition
| No. | Date | Venue | Cap | Opponent | Score | Result | Competition |
|---|---|---|---|---|---|---|---|
| 1 | 4 June 2016 | Sir John Guise Stadium, Port Moresby, Papua New Guinea | 3 | Solomon Islands | 1–0 | 1–0 | 2016 OFC Nations Cup |

== Honours ==
=== Club ===
South Melbourne

- National Premier Leagues Victoria Championship: 2016
- National Premier Leagues Victoria Premiership : 2015
- Dockerty Cup: 2015

=== Country ===
New Zealand

- OFC Nations Cup: 2016
- OFC U-20 Championship: 2013
- OFC U-17 Championship: 2011
