= Francis Niakuam =

Papua New Guinean footballer

Personal information
- Date of birth: 16 October 1966 (age 60)
- Place of birth: Papua New Guinea
- Position: Striker

Senior career*
Years	Team	Apps	(Gls)
1996–2004	Sobou FC		

International career^{‡}
1996–1997	Papua New Guinea	6	(1)
- * Club domestic league appearances and goals as of 22 June 2016 ‡ National team caps and goals as of 22 June 2016

Francis Niakuam (born 16 October 1966) is a retired Papua New Guinean footballer who played as a striker for Sobou FC and the Papua New Guinea national team.
