= Tommy Semmy =

Papua New Guinean soccer player

Personal information
- Date of birth: 30 September 1994 (age 32)
- Place of birth: Bulolo, Papua New Guinea
- Height: 1.78 m (5 ft 10 in)
- Position: Striker

Team information
- Current team: PNG Hekari

Senior career*
Years	Team	Apps	(Gls)
2013–2015	Besta United PNG		
2015–2016	Hekari United		
2016	Marist Fire		
2017	Hekari United		
2017	Malaita Kingz	14	(17)
2017–2021	Hamilton Wanderers	59	(25)
2022–2023	Altona Magic	42	(11)
2022	→ Dandenong City (loan)	7	(3)
2024	Melbourne Knights	17	(2)
2024–2025	Werribee City	5	(0)
2025	Geelong	17	(4)
2025	Melbourne Knights	8	(1)
2026	North Geelong Warriors	0	(0)
2026	PNG Hekari	9	(23)

International career
2013	Papua New Guinea U20	1	(0)
2015	Papua New Guinea U23	6	(3)
2014–	Papua New Guinea	26	(10)
Medal record
Men's football
Representing Papua New Guinea
OFC Nations Cup
Runner-up	2016 Papua New Guinea
Pacific Games
Bronze medal – third place	2015 Papua New Guinea
MSG Prime Minister's Cup
Runner-up	2025 Papua New Guinea
- * Club domestic league appearances and goals

Tommy Semmy (born 30 September 1994) is a Papua New Guinean professional soccer player who plays as a striker for PNG Hekari and the Papua New Guinea national team.

== Club career ==
After making a name for himself playing village football, Semmy played for Besta United PNG of the Papua New Guinea National Soccer League for two seasons beginning in 2013. In 2015, he moved to defending league champions Hekari United and appeared for the club during the 2014–15 OFC Champions League, including in a match against Vanuatu's Tafea in which he scored a goal after an individual effort. He scored again against Tefana in a 3–2 victory in the team's final group stage match. Semmy's two goals were enough to place him tied for fourth place in the scoring charts for the final stages of the tournament. He also played for the club in the 2016 OFC Champions League, scoring two goals in three matches of the group stage. His goals came against AS Lössi of New Caledonia and Suva of Fiji.

In July 2016 it was announced that Semmy, along with three other Hekari players, signed for Marist FC of the Solomon Islands S-League.

In 2017 Semmy joined Malaita Kingz F.C., also of the Telekom S-League. He won the league Golden Boot award that year with 17 goals.

== International career ==
In 2013, Semmy was part of Papua New Guinea's squad for the 2013 OFC U-20 Championship. During the tournament, he made one appearance. He was then named to the squad for the 2015 Pacific Games which were held in Papua New Guinea. The team won the bronze medal, marking the nation's first medal for football at the Pacific Games since 1987. The tournament also doubled as the OFC Men's Olympic Qualifying Tournament for the 2016 Summer Olympics. In preparation for the Pacific Games, manager Ricki Herbert named him to the squad for a pair of friendlies against the Solomon Islands. He scored a brace in the second match as Papua New Guinea won 2–1.

Semmy made his senior international debut in 2014 in a friendly against Singapore. He was named to Papua New Guinea's squad for the 2016 OFC Nations Cup and scored his first senior goal in the nation's opening match against New Caledonia on 29 May. He was given a red card and sent off later in the match.

== Career statistics ==
=== International ===
As of match played 17 November 2024

Papua New Guinea
Year	Apps	Goals
2014	2	0
2016	9	3
2022	4	2
2023	5	1
2024	6	4
Total	26	10

International goals Stats correct as of 17 November 2024

No.	Date	Venue	Opponent	Score	Result	Competition
1	29 May 2016	Sir John Guise Stadium, Port Moresby, Papua New Guinea	New Caledonia	1–0	1–1	2016 OFC Nations Cup
2	17 June 2016	Sir John Guise Stadium, Port Moresby, Papua New Guinea	Malaysia	1–0	2–0	Friendly
3	17 June 2016	Sir John Guise Stadium, Port Moresby, Papua New Guinea	Malaysia	2–0	2–0	Friendly
4	21 March 2022	Qatar SC Stadium, Doha, Qatar	New Caledonia	1–0	1–0	2022 FIFA World Cup qualification
5	24 March 2022	Grand Hamad Stadium, Doha, Qatar	Fiji	2–1	2–1	2022 FIFA World Cup qualification
6	11 October 2023	Stade Yoshida, Koné, New Caledonia	New Caledonia	1–1	1–3	2023 MSG Prime Minister's Cup
7	16 June 2024	HFC Bank Stadium, Suva, Fiji	Fiji	1–5	1–5	2024 OFC Nations Cup
8	22 June 2024	HFC Bank Stadium, Suva, Fiji	Samoa	1–0	2–1	2024 OFC Nations Cup
9	10 October 2024	HFC Bank Stadium, Suva, Fiji	New Caledonia	1–2	1–3	2026 FIFA World Cup qualification
10	17 November 2024	PNG Football Stadium, Port Moresby, Papua Nowa Guinea	Solomon Islands	1–2	1–2	2026 FIFA World Cup qualification

== Honours ==
Hekari United

- Telikom NSL Cup runner-up: 2015–16

Papua New Guinea

- OFC Nations Cup: runner-up, 2016
- MSG Prime Minister's Cup: runner-up, 2025

Papua New Guinea U-23

- Pacific Games: Bronze Medalist, 2015
