= 2016 OFC Nations Cup =

Tournament details
- Host country: Papua New Guinea
- Dates: 28 May – 11 June
- Teams: 8 (from 1 confederation)
- Venue: 1 (in 1 host city)

Final positions
- Champions: New Zealand (5th title)
- Runners-up: Papua New Guinea

Tournament statistics
- Matches played: 15
- Goals scored: 48 (3.2 per match)
- Attendance: 41,996 (2,800 per match)
- Top scorer: (Papua New Guinea) Raymond Gunemba (5 goals)
- Best player: (Papua New Guinea) David Muta
- Best goalkeeper: (New Zealand) Stefan Marinovic
- Fair play award: New Caledonia

The 2016 OFC Nations Cup was the tenth edition of the OFC Nations Cup, the quadrennial international men's football championship of Oceania organised by the Oceania Football Confederation (OFC). The tournament was played between 28 May and 11 June 2016 in Port Moresby, Papua New Guinea. The winner (New Zealand for the record-breaking fifth time) qualified for the 2017 FIFA Confederations Cup in Russia.

Similar to the previous edition in 2012, the group stage of the tournament also doubled as the second round of the 2018 FIFA World Cup qualification tournament for the Oceania region. The top six teams of this tournament (i.e. the top three teams of each group in the group stage) advanced to the third round of World Cup qualifying, to be played between March and October 2017, with the winners of the third round proceeding to the inter-confederation play-offs in November 2017. This meant that once again, the team that won the qualifying competition and advanced to the intercontinental play-off could be different from the team that won the OFC Nations Cup and represented the OFC at the 2017 FIFA Confederations Cup.

The defending champions Tahiti, who had won their first title at the 2012 OFC Nations Cup, were eliminated in the group stage.

== Host selection ==
Tahiti, Fiji, Papua New Guinea and New Zealand were expected to bid to host the event. On 16 October 2015, OFC President David Chung confirmed that Papua New Guinea was the only member association to present a bid to host the 2016 OFC Nations Cup. The OFC confirmed Papua New Guinea as hosts on 30 October 2015.

== Teams ==
All 11 FIFA-affiliated national teams from OFC entered the OFC Nations Cup. The seven highest ranked teams (based on FIFA World Ranking and sporting reasons) among the 11 OFC entrants automatically qualified.

The 4 teams which competed in the qualification round of the 2012 tournament – American Samoa, Cook Islands, Samoa and Tonga – once again competed in a preliminary round. This was a round-robin tournament, held in one location (Tonga). The winners of the tournament, Samoa, qualified to compete alongside the remaining 7 Oceania nations.

=== Qualified teams ===
Team	Method of qualification	Date of qualification	Finals appearance	Last appearance	Previous best performance	FIFA ranking at start of event
Fiji	Automatic	29 March 2014	8th	2012	3rd (1998, 2008)	183
New Caledonia	Automatic	29 March 2014	6th	2012	2nd (2008, 2012)	191
New Zealand	Automatic	29 March 2014	10th	2012	Winners (1973, 1998, 2002, 2008)	161
Papua New Guinea	Automatic	29 March 2014	4th	2012	R1 (1980, 2002, 2012)	198
Solomon Islands	Automatic	29 March 2014	7th	2012	2nd (2004)	192
Tahiti	Automatic	29 March 2014	9th	2012	Winners (2012)	196
Vanuatu	Automatic	29 March 2014	9th	2012	4th (1973, 2000, 2002, 2008)	181
Samoa	Qualifying winner	4 September 2015	2nd	2012	R1 (2012)	170

== Format ==
The format of the OFC Nations Cup was as follows:

- Group stage: The eight teams were divided into two groups of four teams. The top two teams of each group advanced to the knockout stage. Moreover, the top three teams of each group advanced to the third round of 2018 World Cup qualifying.
- Knockout stage: The four teams played a single-elimination tournament (semi-finals and final) to decide the champions of the OFC Nations Cup.

The OFC had considered different proposals of the 2016 OFC Nations Cup. A previous proposal adopted by the OFC in October 2014 had the eight teams divided into two groups of four teams to play home-and-away round-robin matches in the second round, followed by the top two teams of each group advancing to the third round to play in a single group of home-and-away round-robin matches to decide the winner of the 2016 OFC Nations Cup which would both qualify to the 2017 FIFA Confederations Cup and advance to the inter-confederation play-offs. However, it was later reported in April 2015 that the OFC had reversed its decision, and the 2016 OFC Nations Cup will be played as a one-off tournament similar to the 2012 OFC Nations Cup.

== Venues ==
The tournament was played at a single venue in Port Moresby.

Port Moresby is located in Papua New Guinea	Port Moresby
Port Moresby is located in Papua New Guinea	Sir John Guise Stadium
Port Moresby is located in Papua New Guinea	Capacity: 15,000

== Officials ==
10 referees and 12 assistant referees were named for the tournament.

Referees

- (Fiji) Ravitesh Behari
- (New Caledonia) Médéric Lacour
- (New Zealand) Matthew Conger
- (New Zealand) Nick Waldron
- (Papua New Guinea) Amos Anio
- (Solomon Islands) George Time
- (French Polynesia) Norbert Hauata
- (French Polynesia) Abdelkader Zitouni
- (Vanuatu) Robinson Banga
- (Vanuatu) Joel Hopkken

Assistant Referees

- (Cook Islands) John Pareanga
- (Fiji) Ravinesh Kumar
- (Fiji) Avinesh Narayan
- (New Caledonia) Bertrand Brial
- (New Zealand) Mark Rule
- (Papua New Guinea) Norman Bafinu Sali
- (Papua New Guinea) Noah Kusunan
- (Solomon Islands) Johnny Erick Niabo
- (French Polynesia) Philippe Revel
- (Tonga) Folio Moeaki
- (Tonga) Tevita Makasini
- (Vanuatu) Hilmon Sese

== Draw ==
The draw for the 2016 OFC Nations Cup was held as part of the 2018 FIFA World Cup Preliminary Draw on 25 July 2015, starting 18:00 MSK (UTC+3), at the Konstantinovsky Palace in Strelna, Saint Petersburg, Russia.

The seeding was based on the FIFA World Rankings of July 2015 (shown in parentheses). The eight teams were seeded into two pots:

- Pot 1 contained the direct qualifiers ranked 1–4.
- Pot 2 contained the direct qualifiers ranked 5–7 and the first round winner.

Each group contained two teams from Pot 1 and two teams from Pot 2. As the draw was held before the first round was played, the identity of the first round winner was not known at the time of the draw. The fixtures of each group were decided based on the draw position of each team (teams in Pot 1 drawn to position 1 or 2, teams in Pot 2 drawn to position 3 or 4).

Note: Bolded teams qualified for the World Cup qualifying third round.

Pot 1	Pot 2
1. **New Zealand** (136); 2. **New Caledonia** (167); 3. **Tahiti** (188); 4. **Solomon Islands** (191)	5. Vanuatu (197); 6. **Fiji** (199); 7. **Papua New Guinea** (202); 8. Samoa (198) (first round winner)

== Group stage ==
2018 FIFA World Cup qualification tiebreakers
In league format, the ranking of teams in each group was based on the following criteria (regulations Articles 20.6 and 20.7):
1. Points (3 points for a win, 1 point for a draw, 0 points for a loss)
2. Overall goal difference
3. Overall goals scored
4. Points in matches between tied teams
5. Goal difference in matches between tied teams
6. Goals scored in matches between tied teams
7. Away goals scored in matches between tied teams (if the tie was only between two teams in home-and-away league format)
8. Fair play points
  - first yellow card: minus 1 point
  - indirect red card (second yellow card): minus 3 points
  - direct red card: minus 4 points
  - yellow card and direct red card: minus 5 points
9. Drawing of lots by the FIFA Organising Committee

All times are local, UTC+10.

=== Group A ===
Pos	Team	Pld	W	D	L	GF	GA	GD	Pts	Qualification
1	Papua New Guinea (H)	3	1	2	0	11	3	+8	5	Qualification to Nations Cup knockout stage and World Cup qualifying third round
2	New Caledonia	3	1	2	0	9	2	+7	5	Qualification to Nations Cup knockout stage and World Cup qualifying third round
3	Tahiti	3	1	2	0	7	3	+4	5	Qualification to World Cup qualifying third round
4	Samoa	3	0	0	3	0	19	−19	0	

Source: FIFA
Rules for classification: Qualification tiebreakers
(H) Hosts
29 May 2016
16:00

Papua New Guinea	1–1	New Caledonia
Semmy 41'	Report (FIFA); Report (OFC)	Saïko 83'

Sir John Guise Stadium, Port Moresby
Attendance: 4,231
Referee: Matthew Conger (New Zealand)
29 May 2016
19:00

Tahiti	4–0	Samoa
T. Tehau 2', 5'; Chong Hue 15'; A. Tehau 39'	Report (FIFA); Report (OFC)

Sir John Guise Stadium, Port Moresby
Attendance: 4,720
Referee: Ravitesh Behari (Fiji)
1 June 2016
16:00

Papua New Guinea	2–2	Tahiti
Gunemba 45+1', 64'	Report (FIFA); Report (OFC)	A. Tehau 66'; T. Tehau 76'

Sir John Guise Stadium, Port Moresby
Attendance: 1,643
Referee: Nick Waldron (New Zealand)
1 June 2016
19:00

New Caledonia	7–0	Samoa
Kayara 18', 30'; Nemia 28'; Zeoula 38' (pen.); Wadriako 53'; Cexome 79'; Dahité 89' (pen.)	Report (FIFA); Report (OFC)

Sir John Guise Stadium, Port Moresby
Attendance: 2,015
Referee: Robinson Banga (Vanuatu)
5 June 2016
16:00

Samoa	0–8	Papua New Guinea
	Report (FIFA); Report (OFC)	Foster 13', 51'; Gunemba 33', 63', 85'; Dabinyaba 58', 74'; Upaiga 67'

Sir John Guise Stadium, Port Moresby
Attendance: 2,678
Referee: Joel Hopkken (Vanuatu)
5 June 2016
19:00

Tahiti	1–1	New Caledonia
T. Tehau 90+2'	Report (FIFA); Report (OFC)	Kaï 80'

Sir John Guise Stadium, Port Moresby
Attendance: 3,158
Referee: Nick Waldron (New Zealand)

=== Group B ===
Pos	Team	Pld	W	D	L	GF	GA	GD	Pts	Qualification
1	New Zealand	3	3	0	0	9	1	+8	9	Qualification to Nations Cup knockout stage and World Cup qualifying third round
2	Solomon Islands	3	1	0	2	1	2	−1	3	Qualification to Nations Cup knockout stage and World Cup qualifying third round
3	Fiji	3	1	0	2	4	6	−2	3	Qualification to World Cup qualifying third round
4	Vanuatu	3	1	0	2	3	8	−5	3	

Source: FIFA
Rules for classification: Qualification tiebreakers
28 May 2016
16:00

New Zealand	3–1	Fiji
Tzimopoulos 16'; Fallon 41'; Wood 61' (pen.)	Report (FIFA); Report (OFC)	Krishna 45+2' (pen.)

Sir John Guise Stadium, Port Moresby
Attendance: 378
Referee: Norbert Hauata (Tahiti)
28 May 2016
19:00

Vanuatu	0–1	Solomon Islands
	Report (FIFA); Report (OFC)	Donga 19'

Sir John Guise Stadium, Port Moresby
Attendance: 1,611
Referee: Médéric Lacour (New Caledonia)
31 May 2016
16:00

Vanuatu	0–5	New Zealand
	Report (FIFA); Report (OFC)	Wood 4', 5'; McGlinchey 10'; Fallon 19'; Barbarouses 45'

Sir John Guise Stadium, Port Moresby
Attendance: 520
Referee: Amos Anio (Papua New Guinea)
31 May 2016
19:00

Solomon Islands	0–1	Fiji
	Report (FIFA); Report (OFC)	Krishna 85' (pen.)

Sir John Guise Stadium, Port Moresby
Attendance: 798
Referee: Abdelkader Zitouni (Tahiti)
4 June 2016
16:00

Fiji	2–3	Vanuatu
Kautoga 51'; Krishna 69'	Report (FIFA); Report (OFC)	Fred 19'; Masauvakalo 41'; Kaltak 75' (pen.)

Sir John Guise Stadium, Port Moresby
Attendance: 851
Referee: Abdelkader Zitouni (Tahiti)
4 June 2016
19:00

New Zealand	1–0	Solomon Islands
Adams 80'	Report (FIFA); Report (OFC)

Sir John Guise Stadium, Port Moresby
Attendance: 1,925
Referee: Norbert Hauata (Tahiti)

== Knockout stage ==
If tied after regulation, extra time and, if necessary, penalty shoot-out would be used to decide the winner. All times are local, UTC+10.

=== Bracket ===
Semi-finals
8 June – Port Moresby
New Zealand	1
New Caledonia	0
8 June – Port Moresby
Papua New Guinea	2
Solomon Islands	1

Final
11 June – Port Moresby
New Zealand (p)	0 (4)
Papua New Guinea	0 (2)

=== Semi-finals ===
8 June 2016
16:10

New Zealand	1–0	New Caledonia
Wood 49'	Report (FIFA); Report (OFC)

Sir John Guise Stadium, Port Moresby
Attendance: 1,379
Referee: Abdelkader Zitouni (Tahiti)

8 June 2016
19:40

Papua New Guinea	2–1	Solomon Islands
Foster 38'; Dabinyaba 82'	Report (FIFA); Report (OFC)	Molea 41'

Sir John Guise Stadium, Port Moresby
Attendance: 3,548
Referee: Matthew Conger (New Zealand)

=== Final ===
11 June 2016
16:00

New Zealand	0–0 (a.e.t.)	Papua New Guinea
	Report (FIFA); Report (OFC)
Penalties
Fallon (penalty scored); McGlinchey (penalty scored); Dyer (penalty scored); Brockie (penalty missed); Rojas (penalty scored)	4–2	(penalty missed) Upaiga; (penalty scored) Semmy; (penalty scored) Foster; (penalty missed) Gunemba

Sir John Guise Stadium, Port Moresby
Attendance: 13,000
Referee: Norbert Hauata (Tahiti)

== Winners ==
2016 OFC Nations Cup winners

New Zealand
Fifth title

== Goalscorers ==
There were 48 goals scored in 15 matches, for an average of 3.2 goals per match.

5 goals

- (Papua New Guinea) Raymond Gunemba

4 goals

- (New Zealand) Chris Wood
- (French Polynesia) Teaonui Tehau

3 goals

- (Fiji) Roy Krishna
- (Papua New Guinea) Nigel Dabinyaba
- (Papua New Guinea) Michael Foster

2 goals

- (New Caledonia) Roy Kayara
- (New Zealand) Rory Fallon
- (French Polynesia) Alvin Tehau

1 goal

- (Fiji) Samuela Kautoga
- (New Caledonia) Joerisse Cexome
- (New Caledonia) Brice Dahite
- (New Caledonia) Bertrand Kaï
- (New Caledonia) Kevin Nemia
- (New Caledonia) Jean-Philippe Saïko
- (New Caledonia) Jean-Brice Wadriako
- (New Caledonia) César Zeoula
- (New Zealand) Luke Adams
- (New Zealand) Kosta Barbarouses
- (New Zealand) Michael McGlinchey
- (New Zealand) Themistoklis Tzimopoulos
- (Papua New Guinea) Tommy Semmy
- (Papua New Guinea) Koriak Upaiga
- (Solomon Islands) Jerry Donga
- (Solomon Islands) Judd Molea
- (French Polynesia) Steevy Chong Hue
- (Vanuatu) Dominique Fred
- (Vanuatu) Brian Kaltak
- (Vanuatu) Fenedy Masauvakalo

== Awards ==
Award	Player	Team
Golden Ball	David Muta	Papua New Guinea
Golden Boot	Raymond Gunemba	Papua New Guinea
Golden Gloves	Stefan Marinovic	New Zealand
Fair Play Award	—	New Caledonia

== Broadcasting rights ==
Country	Broadcaster	Ref.
OFC	OFC TV	
Asia Pacific	Fox Sports	
South Asia	Star Sports	
European Union	Eurosport	
Australia	SBS	
Fiji	FBC TV	
French Polynesia	Tahiti Nui TV	
New Caledonia	Nouvelle-Calédonie 1re	
New Zealand	Sky Sport	
Papua New Guinea	EM TV	
Samoa	TV1 Samoa	
Solomon Islands	Telekom Television	
Vanuatu	Television Blong Vanuatu	
