= Michael McGlinchey =

New Zealand footballer (born 1987)

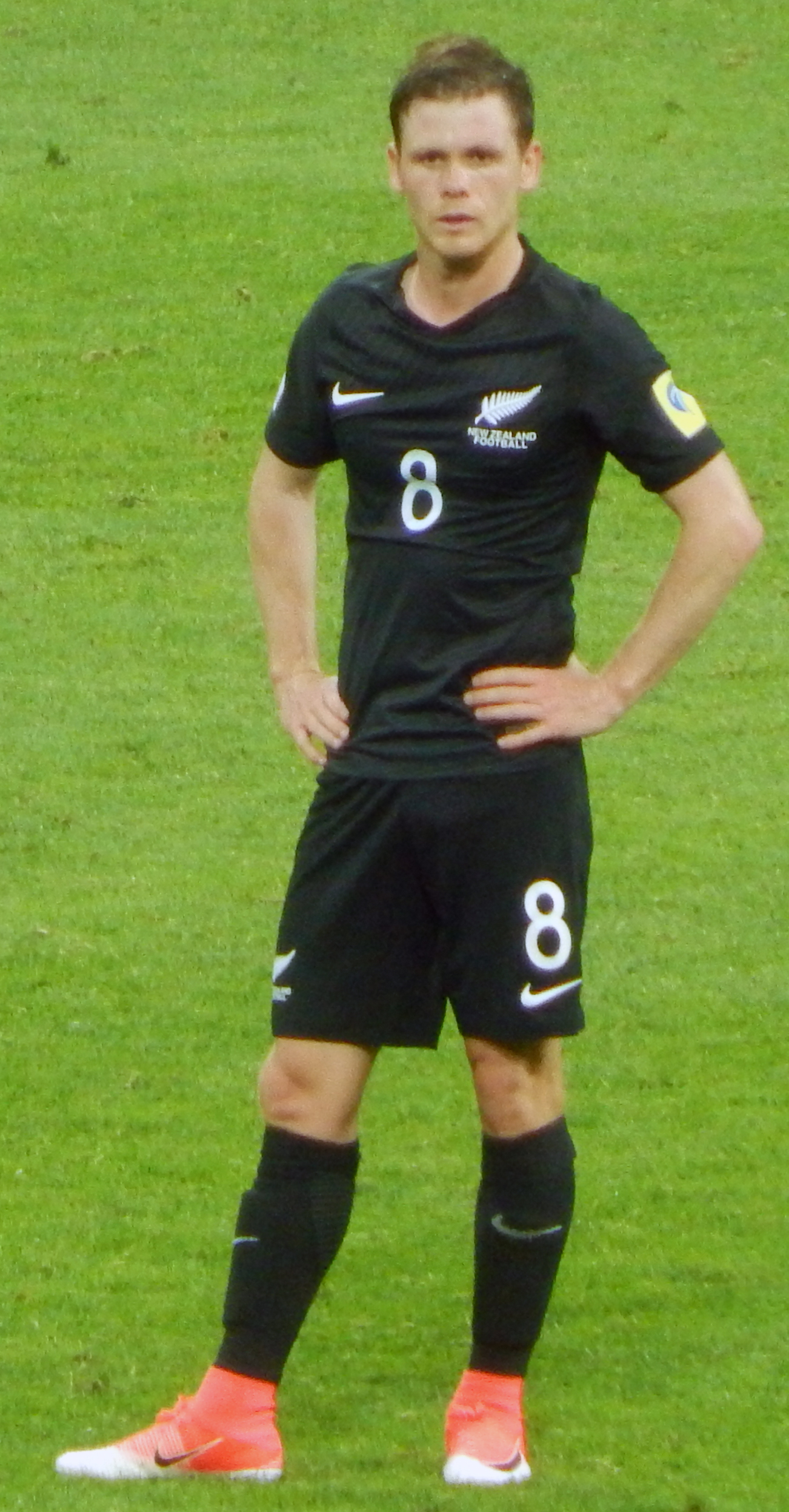
- McGlinchey with New Zealand in 2017

Personal information
- Full name: Michael Ryan McGlinchey
- Date of birth: 7 January 1987 (age 39)
- Place of birth: Wellington, New Zealand
- Height: 1.75 m (5 ft 9 in)
- Position: Midfielder

Senior career*
Years	Team	Apps	(Gls)
2005–2009	Celtic	1	(0)
2007–2008	→ Dunfermline Athletic (loan)	8	(0)
2009–2014	Central Coast Mariners	120	(11)
2010	→ Motherwell (loan)	8	(0)
2014	→ Vegalta Sendai (loan)	6	(0)
2014–2018	Wellington Phoenix	85	(11)
2018–2020	Central Coast Mariners	28	(0)
2020–2021	Queen's Park	3	(0)
2021	Clyde	10	(0)
Total		283	(22)

International career^{‡}
2007	Scotland U-20	4	(0)
2007	Scotland U-21	1	(0)
2012	New Zealand Olympic (O.P.)	3	(0)
2009–2019	New Zealand	54	(5)
- * Club domestic league appearances and goals as of 6 May 2021 ‡ National team caps and goals as of 1 September 2017

Michael Ryan McGlinchey (born 7 January 1987) is a New Zealand former footballer who played as a midfielder.

McGlinchey played youth football with Scottish club Celtic, where he made his professional debut. After spending time on loan to Dunfermline Athletic, he joined Central Coast Mariners in the A-League, where he made over 100 appearances. In his time at the club he spent periods on loan at Motherwell in 2010 and with Vegalta Sendai in 2014. He joined Wellington Phoenix in 2014 after securing a release from the Mariners. He returned to the Mariners in 2018, before returning to Scotland with Queen's Park and then Clyde in 2020. He then returned to Australia in 2022, to play for Weston Bears in the National Premier Leagues.

McGlinchey represented Scotland at under-20 and under-21 level, but changed allegiance to New Zealand, his country of birth, at senior level. He was a member of the New Zealand national team at the 2010 World Cup and was one of New Zealand's over-age players at the 2012 Summer Olympics. He made over fifty appearances for New Zealand, scoring five goals.

== Club career ==
=== Celtic ===
McGlinchey, a midfielder, was brought through the ranks at Scottish giants Celtic and was persuaded by then-manager Martin O'Neill at the age of 17 to resist the temptation to sign a professional contract with Manchester United and sign with the club he supported as a youngster. McGlinchey made his Celtic debut against Livingston as a substitute in December 2005. It was his sole appearance for the Scottish Premier League team, as O'Neill was replaced by Gordon Strachan and McGlinchey found himself moving to the fringes.

During the 2007–08 season he was then loaned out to Scottish First Division club Dunfermline Athletic until 20 January 2008. Although McGlinchey was successful during his loan deal at the First Division club, his loan was terminated early after he suffered a groin injury. He was released by Celtic in May 2009.

=== Central Coast Mariners ===
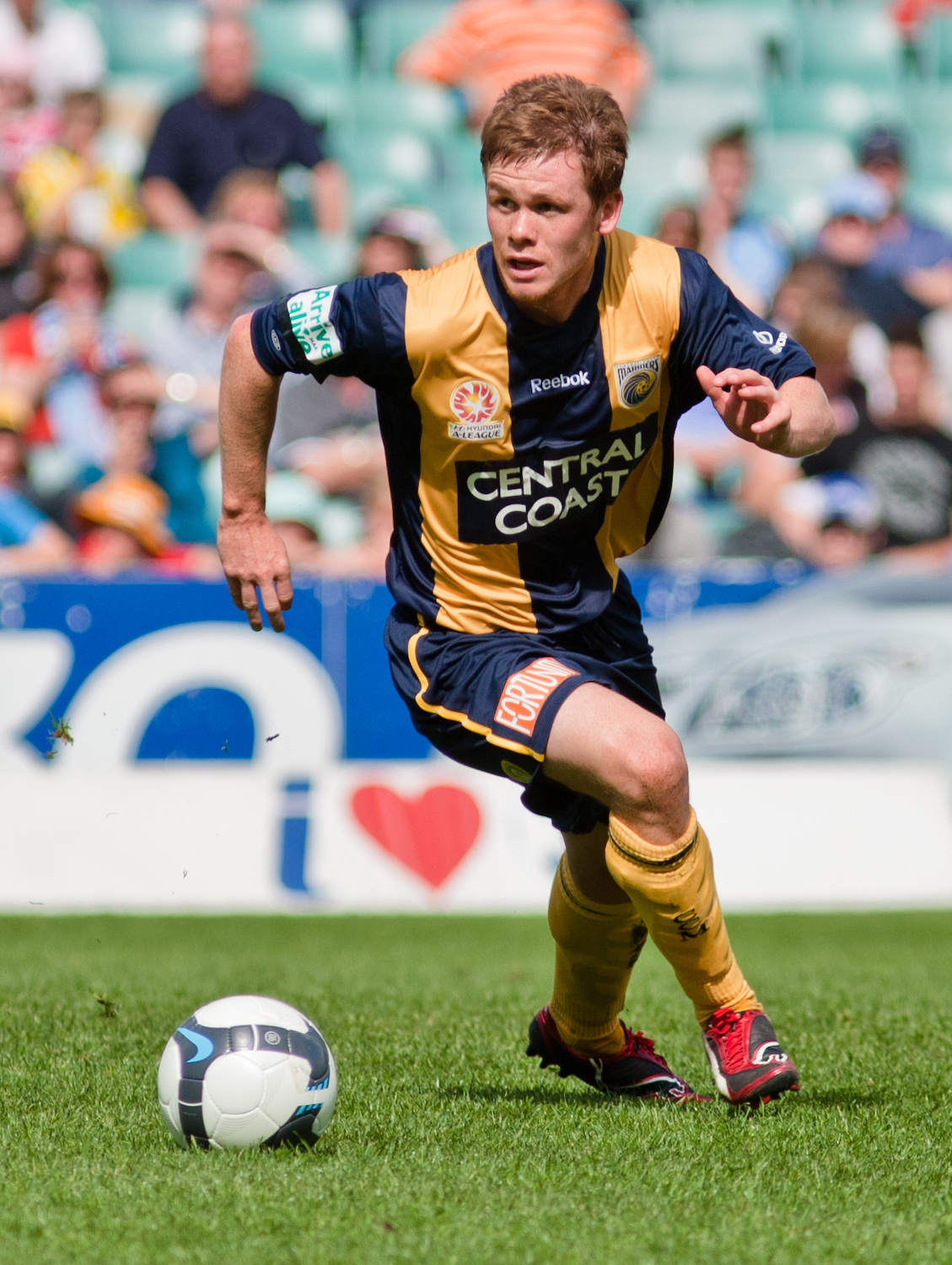
McGlinchey playing for Central Coast Mariners in 2009

McGlinchey then had a successful trial with Central Coast Mariners in the A-League, signing a two-year deal with the club.

He made his Mariners debut against Melbourne Victory in the A-League season opener on 6 August 2009, and also scored his first goal for the club on debut in the 2–0 upset win over the reigning champions. It was also his first professional goal ever.

With the 2009–10 A-League season drawing to a close, McGlinchey decided to seek more first team football in the off season as buildup to the 2010 FIFA World Cup, signing a season-long loan deal with Scottish Premier League club Motherwell.

==== Dispute ====
McGlinchey tried to leave the Central Coast Mariners on a free transfer but in August 2014, it was ruled that the player was still contracted to the Mariners. The PFA argued unsuccessfully that McGlinchey should be able to move to Wellington Phoenix on a free transfer as the club had been sold to new owners. However, on 11 September 2014, Central Coast Mariners conceded they would no longer pursue McGlinchey's services for the upcoming A-League season, citing his personal desire to no longer be involved with the club as a major contributing factor, and that following the receipt of compensation from McGlinchey his contract was terminated.

=== Motherwell ===
McGlinchey signed a loan contract with the Scottish side in February 2010 for the remainder of the 2009–10 season, and made 8 appearances.

=== Vegalta Sendai ===
On 23 December 2013, Central Coast Mariners announced McGlinchey would be going on a year loan spell to Vegalta Sendai, following Graham Arnold who had been recently appointed head coach. On 11 June 2014 Vegalta Sendai announced that they had terminated McGlinchey's loan, after Arnold had been sacked by the club 2 months earlier.

=== Wellington Phoenix ===
On 12 September 2014, McGlinchey signed a two-year contract with Wellington Phoenix after securing his release from Mariners the day before. On 1 May 2018, after four seasons with Wellington Phoenix, McGlinchey was released from the club.

=== Return to Central Coast Mariners ===
In June 2018, McGlinchey re-joined the Central Coast Mariners, signing a two-year contract. He was released by the Mariners at the end of the 2019–20 A-League.

=== Return to Scotland ===
In October 2020, McGlinchey returned to Scotland, signing with Scottish League Two side Queen's Park. He left the club in January 2021 at the end of his short-term contract.

McGlinchey signed with Scottish League One side Clyde in March 2021 on a deal until the end of the 2020–21 season.

=== Return to Australia ===
In February 2022, McGlinchey returned to Australia to sign for National Premier Leagues side Weston Bears.

== International career ==
McGlinchey was eligible to play for Scotland, the Republic of Ireland and New Zealand. His father, Norrie McGlinchey was a footballer playing in New Zealand, he represented Stop Out and Hutt Valley United during his career. The McGlinchey family returned to Scotland when Michael was one year old.

McGlinchey played two games for Scotland at the 2007 FIFA U-20 World Cup against Costa Rica and Nigeria.

In 2009, he took advantage of a FIFA Congress resolution which removed the age limit for changing associations for players who had already played for a country's national team at age group level and declared himself available for selection for the New Zealand All Whites. He was then included by New Zealand manager Ricki Herbert in the squad to face Jordan, before the 2010 World Cup play-off matches against Bahrain. McGlinchey made his New Zealand debut on 9 September 2009, in the match against Jordan.

McGlinchey played a pivotal role in the Inter-confederation play-off match against Bahrain in both the away leg in Ar Rifa' off the bench as a second-half substitute and made the starting XI in the home fixture in Wellington which New Zealand went on to win 1–0 thanks to a first half goal from striker Rory Fallon.

On 10 May 2010, McGlinchey was named in New Zealand's final 23-man squad to compete at the 2010 FIFA World Cup. He was one of New Zealand's three over-age players at the 2012 Summer Olympics, playing in all three of their matches in group C.

== Career statistics ==
=== Club ===
Appearances and goals by club, season and competition
Club	Season	League			National cup (Note: Includes FFA Cup)		League cup (Note: Includes J.League Cup, Scottish League Cup)		Continental		Other		Total	
Club	Season	Division	Apps	Goals	Apps	Goals	Apps	Goals	Apps	Goals	Apps	Goals	Apps	Goals
Celtic	2005–06	Scottish Premier League	1	0	0	0	0	0	0	0	—		1	0
Celtic	2006–07	Scottish Premier League	0	0	0	0	0	0	0	0	—		0	0
Celtic	2007–08	Scottish Premier League	0	0	0	0	0	0	0	0	—		0	0
Celtic	2008–09	Scottish Premier League	0	0	0	0	0	0	0	0	—		0	0
Celtic	Total		1	0	0	0	0	0	0	0	0	0	1	0
Dunfermline Athletic (loan)	2007–08	Scottish First Division	8	0	0	0	0	0	—		1 (Note: Appearance in Scottish League Challenge Cup)	0	9	0
Central Coast Mariners	2009–10	A-League	21	1	—		—		—		—		21	1
Central Coast Mariners	2010–11	A-League	34	1	—		—		—		—		34	1
Central Coast Mariners	2011–12	A-League	30	1	—		—		6 (Note: Appearances in the AFC Champions League)	1	—		36	2
Central Coast Mariners	2012–13	A-League	26	6	—		—		7	1	—		33	7
Central Coast Mariners	2013–14	A-League	9	2	—		—		0	0	—		9	2
Central Coast Mariners	Total		120	11	0	0	0	0	13	2	0	0	133	13
Motherwell (loan)	2009–10	Scottish Premier League	8	0	0	0	0	0	0	0	—		8	0
Vegalta Sendai (loan)	2014	J1 League	6	0	0	0	3	0	—		—		9	0
Wellington Phoenix	2014–15	A-League	25	5	0	0	—		—		—		25	5
Wellington Phoenix	2015–16	A-League	26	3	2	0	—		—		—		28	3
Wellington Phoenix	2016–17	A-League	13	3	1	0	—		—		—		14	3
Wellington Phoenix	2017–18	A-League	21	0	1	0	—		—		—		22	0
Wellington Phoenix	Total		85	11	4	0	0	0	0	0	0	0	89	11
Central Coast Mariners	2018–19	A-League	20	0	1	0	—		—		—		21	0
Central Coast Mariners	2019–20	A-League	8	0	1	2	—		—		—		9	2
Central Coast Mariners	Total		28	0	2	2	0	0	0	0	0	0	30	2
Queen's Park	2020–21	Scottish League Two	3	0	0	0	2	0	—		—		5	0
Clyde	2020–21	Scottish League One	10	0	0	0	0	0	—		—		10	0
Weston Workers	2022	NPL NNSW	14	0	1	0	—		—		—		15	0
Career total			273	22	7	2	5	0	13	2	1	0	299	26

=== International ===
New Zealand national team
Year	Apps	Goals
2009	3	0
2010	4	0
2011	3	1
2012	11	2
2013	4	0
2014	5	0
2015	3	0
2016	7	1
2017	11	1
2018	1	0
2019	2	0
Total	54	5

==== International goals ====
As of match played 15 November 2017. New Zealand score listed first, score column indicates score after each McGlinchey goal.

International goals by date, venue, cap, opponent, score, result and competition
No.	Date	Venue	Cap	Opponent	Score	Result	Competition
1	25 March 2011	Wuhan Sports Center Stadium, Wuhan, China	8	China	1–1	1–1	Friendly
2	16 October 2012	Rugby League Park, Christchurch, New Zealand	20	Tahiti	1–0	3–0	2014 FIFA World Cup qualification
3	16 October 2012	Rugby League Park, Christchurch, New Zealand	20	Tahiti	3–0	3–0	2014 FIFA World Cup qualification
4	31 May 2016	Sir John Guise Stadium, Port Moresby, Papua New Guinea	35	Vanuatu	3–0	5–0	2016 OFC Nations Cup
5	1 September 2017	North Harbour Stadium, Auckland, New Zealand	48	Solomon Islands	5–1	6–1	2018 FIFA World Cup qualification

== Honours ==
=== Club ===
Central Coast Mariners:

- A-League Premiership: 2011–12
- A-League Championship: 2012–13

=== International ===
New Zealand

- OFC Nations Cup: 2016

=== Individual ===
- PFA A-League Team of the Season: 2012–13
- A-League All Star: 2013

== See also ==
- List of Central Coast Mariners FC players
- List of sportspeople who competed for more than one nation
