= Koriak Upaiga =

Papua New Guinean footballer

Personal information
- Full name: Koriak Upaiga
- Date of birth: 13 June 1987 (age 39)
- Place of birth: Mount Hagen, Papua New Guinea
- Height: 1.66 m (5 ft 5 in)
- Position: Defender

Team information
- Current team: Hekari United
- Number: 19

Senior career*
Years	Team	Apps	(Gls)
2009–2012	Hekari United		
2012–2013	Sunshine Coast		
2013–2016	Hekari United		
2016–2019	Marist		
2019–	Hekari United		

International career^{‡}
2011–	Papua New Guinea	21	(2)
Medal record
Men's football
Representing Papua New Guinea
OFC Nations Cup
Runner-up	2016 Papua New Guinea
- * Club domestic league appearances and goals as of 20 July 2016 ‡ National team caps and goals as of 27 March 2022

Koriak Upaiga (born 13 June 1987) is a Papua New Guinean footballer who plays as a defender for PRK Hekari United.

== International career ==
=== International goals ===
Scores and results list Papua New Guinea's goal tally first.

No.	Date	Venue	Opponent	Score	Result	Competition
1.	5 June 2016	Sir John Guise Stadium, Port Moresby, Papua New Guinea	Samoa	6–0	8–0	2016 OFC Nations Cup
2.	18 July 2019	National Soccer Stadium, Apia, Samoa	Tonga	7–0	8–0	2019 Pacific Games

== Honours ==
Papua New Guinea

- OFC Nations Cup: runner-up, 2016
