= Abdelkader Zitouni =

Abdelkader "Kader" Zitouni
- Born: 7 June 1981 (age 45); Limoges, France

International
| Years | League | Role |
| since 2012 | FIFA-listed | Referee |

Abdelkader "Kader" Zitouni (born 7 June 1981) is a football referee of Algerian descent who comes from Limoges, France. He officiated in the 2011 Pacific Games, 2012 OFC Nations Cup and 2016 OFC Nations Cup.

Zitouni has served as a FIFA referee since 2012, and was included as a support referee in the 2017 FIFA Confederations Cup and the 2019 FIFA Club World Cup.

Zitouni was the only match official set to represent the Oceania Football Confederation at the first FIFA event for 2021.
