= Matthew Conger =

Former New Zealand football referee

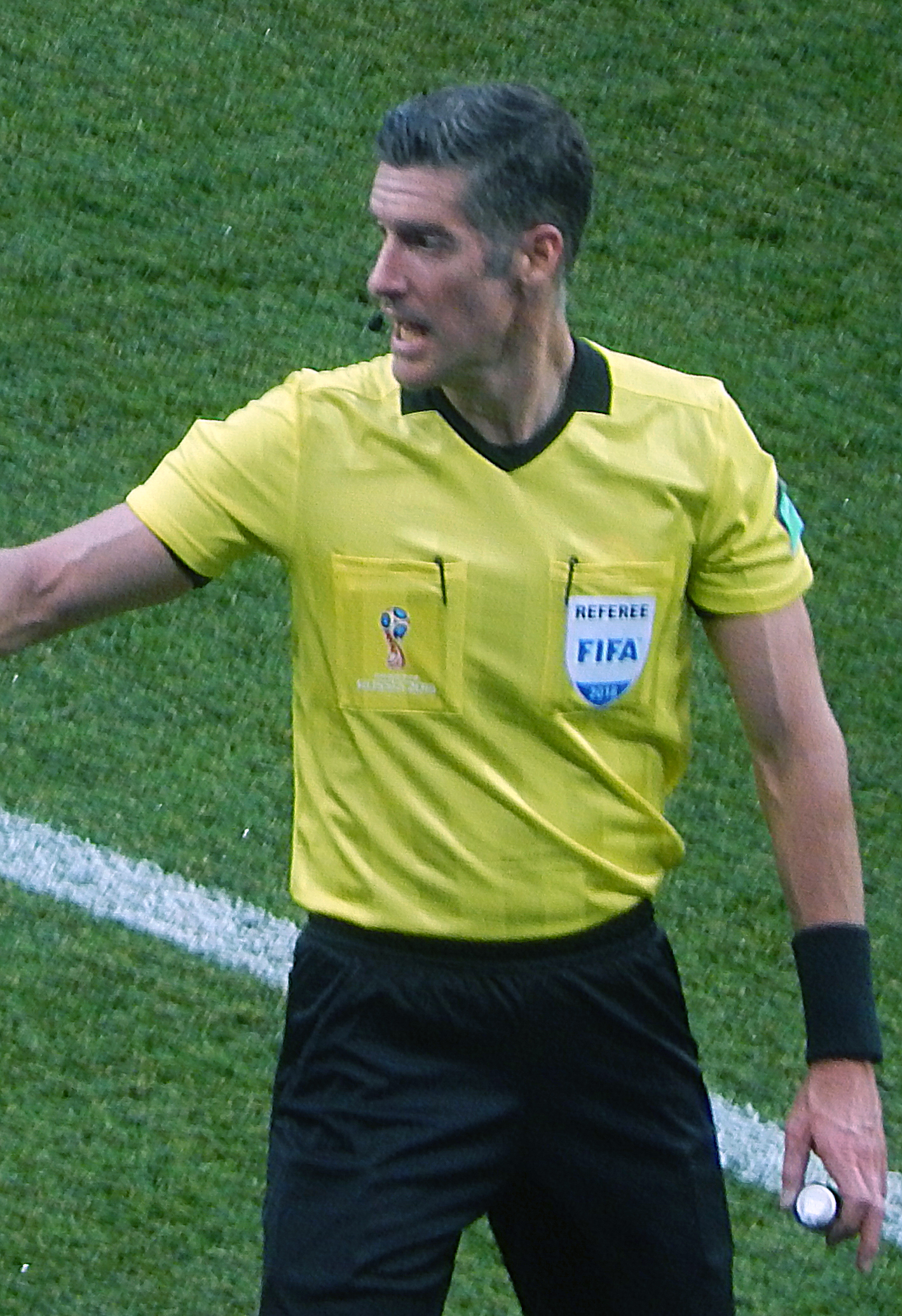
- Born: 11 October 1978 (age 48); Plano, Texas, U.S.
- Other occupation: Teacher

Domestic
Years	League	Role
2007–2024	NZFC	Referee
2014–2019	A-League	Referee

International
Years	League	Role
2013–2024	FIFA listed	Referee

Matthew Conger (born 11 October 1978) is a retired New Zealand football referee from Palmerston North. Born in Texas, United States, Conger operated in the Australian A-League and the New Zealand Football Championship. He is a former school teacher from Palmerston North who now works for Sport Manawatu.

== Refereeing career ==
Conger began refereeing in the United States as a teenager, continuing after moving to New Zealand in his early 20s.

Conger has refereed at the 2015 Under-20 World Cup in New Zealand (including as fourth official in the final), the 2016 Olympic Games in Rio de Janeiro, the 2017 Under-20 World Cup in South Korea, the 2018 FIFA World Cup in Russia, and the 2022 FIFA World Cup in Qatar. He has also officiated in numerous A-League and New Zealand Football Championship games. He has also been the man in the middle for OFC Champions League games.

In 2016, Conger left full-time teaching in order to concentrate more on his refereeing, but in 2017 was engaged part-time at Palmerston North's Carncot School.

In 2017, Conger was named the New Zealand referee of the year.

== FIFA World Cup ==
2018 FIFA World Cup – Russia
Date	Match	Venue	Round
22 June 2018	Nigeria – Iceland	Volgograd	Group stage

2022 FIFA World Cup – Qatar
Date	Match	Venue	Round
30 November 2022	Tunisia – France	Al Rayyan	Group stage
