= Raymond Gunemba =

Papua New Guinean footballer

Personal information
- Full name: Raymond Gunemba
- Date of birth: 4 June 1986 (age 40)
- Place of birth: Lae, Morobe Province, Papua New Guinea
- Height: 1.67 m (5 ft 6 in)
- Position: Forward

Senior career*
Years	Team	Apps	(Gls)
2007	Gigira Laitepo		
2008–2010	Rapatona Tigers		
2011–2014	Hekari United		
2014	Lae F.C.		
2014–2016	Lae City Dwellers		
2016–2017	Hamilton Wanderers	13	(5)
2017	Lae City Dwellers		
2017	Henderson Eels		
2017–2018	Toti City Dwellers		
2018	Geelong SC	12	(2)
2018–2019	Toti City Dwellers		
2020	Hekari United		
2021	Lautoka F.C.		
2021–2025	Dwellers		
2026	PNG Hekari		
2026–	Wawa		

International career
2012–	Papua New Guinea	37	(18)
Medal record
Representing Papua New Guinea
OFC Nations Cup
Runner-up	2016 Papua New Guinea
MSG Prime Minister's Cup
Winner	2022 Vanuatu
Winner	2024 Solomon Islands
Runner-up	2025 Papua New Guinea
- * Club domestic league appearances and goals

Raymond Gunemba (born 4 June 1986) is a Papua New Guinean professional footballer and coach who plays as a forward.

== International goals ==
As of match played 14 November 2024. Papua New Guinea score listed first, score column indicates score after each Gunemba goal.

International goals by date, venue, opponent, score, result and competition
No.	Date	Venue	Opponent	Score	Result	Competition
1	6 September 2014	Hougang Stadium, Hougang, Singapore	Singapore	1–2	1–2	Friendly
2	27 March 2016	Lawson Tama Stadium, Honiara, Solomon Islands	Solomon Islands	1–1	2–1	Friendly
3	1 June 2016	Sir John Guise Stadium, Port Moresby, Papua New Guinea	Tahiti	1–0	2–2	2016 OFC Nations Cup
4	1 June 2016	Sir John Guise Stadium, Port Moresby, Papua New Guinea	Tahiti	2–0	2–2	2016 OFC Nations Cup
5	5 June 2016	Sir John Guise Stadium, Port Moresby, Papua New Guinea	Samoa	2–0	8–0	2016 OFC Nations Cup
6	5 June 2016	Sir John Guise Stadium, Port Moresby, Papua New Guinea	Samoa	5–0	8–0	2016 OFC Nations Cup
7	5 June 2016	Sir John Guise Stadium, Port Moresby, Papua New Guinea	Samoa	8–0	8–0	2016 OFC Nations Cup
8	28 March 2017	Stade Pater, Pirae, Tahiti	Tahiti	2–0	2–1	2018 FIFA World Cup qualification
9	13 June 2017	PNG Football Stadium, Port Moresby, Papua New Guinea	Solomon Islands	1–0	1–2	2018 FIFA World Cup qualification
10	8 July 2019	National Soccer Stadium, Apia, Samoa	Samoa	5–0	6–0	2019 Pacific Games
11	10 July 2019	National Soccer Stadium, Apia, Samoa	Vanuatu	1–0	2–0	2019 Pacific Games
12	20 June 2023	National Stadium, Kallang, Singapore	Singapore	2–2	2–2	Friendly
13	8 October 2023	Stade Numa-Daly Magenta, Nouméa, New Caledonia	Solomon Islands	1–0	1–3	2023 MSG Prime Minister's Cup
14	14 November 2024	PNG Football Stadium, Port Moresby, Papua New Guinea	Fiji	3–2	3–3	2026 FIFA World Cup qualification
15	15 December 2024	National Stadium, Honiara, Solomon Islands	Fiji	1–0	1–1	2024 MSG Prime Minister's Cup
16	21 December 2024	National Stadium, Honiara, Solomon Islands	Vanuatu	2–0	1–2	2024 MSG Prime Minister's Cup
17	20 November 2025	PNG Football Stadium, Port Moresby, Papua New Guinea	Fiji	1–0	2–0	2025 MSG Prime Minister's Cup
18	20 November 2025	PNG Football Stadium, Port Moresby, Papua New Guinea	Fiji	2–0	2–0	2025 MSG Prime Minister's Cup

== Honours ==
=== Player ===
PRK Hekari United

- Papua New Guinea National Soccer League: 2011–12, 2013, 2014

Lae City Dwellers

- Papua New Guinea National Soccer League: 2015

Papua New Guinea

- OFC Nations Cup: runner-up, 2016
- MSG Prime Minister's Cup: 2022, 2024; runner-up, 2025

=== Individual ===
- OFC Nations Cup Golden Boot: 2016
- IFFHS OFC Men's Team of the Decade 2011–2020

== See also ==
- Meagen Gunemba
