= Michael Foster (footballer) =

Papua New Guinean footballer

Personal information
- Full name: Michael Foster
- Date of birth: September 5, 1985 (age 41)
- Place of birth: Lae, Papua New Guinea
- Height: 1.80 m (5 ft 11 in)
- Position: Midfielder

Senior career*
Years	Team	Apps	(Gls)
2003	Mopi		
2004	Cosmos		
2008–2010	Hekari United		
2010–2012	Eastern Stars		
2013	FC Port Moresby		
2014–2015	Admiralty FC		
2015	Rapatona		
2015–2016	Lae City		
2016	Malaita Kingz		
2017	Geelong SC	16	(1)
2017–2018	Malaita Kingz		
2018	Madang FC		
2019	Lae City		
2019	Malaita Kingz		
2019	Hekari United		

International career
2002	Papua New Guinea U20	2	(0)
2003–	Papua New Guinea	29	(7)
Medal record
Men's football
Representing Papua New Guinea
OFC Nations Cup
Runner-up	2016 Papua New Guinea
- * Club domestic league appearances and goals

Michael Foster (born 5 September 1985) is a Papua New Guinean international footballer who plays as a midfielder. He is also a member of the Papua New Guinea national team.

He is the current is record-holder for the most caps for the Papua New Guinea national team, having made his senior international debut aged 17. He was also part of the historic Hekari United side which won the 2009–10 OFC Champions League, becoming the first club outside of Australia and New Zealand to represent Oceania at the FIFA Club World Cup.

== Early life ==
Foster was born in Lae, in the Momase Region of the country. He is the son of former international goalkeeper Max Foster.

== Club career ==
=== Early career ===
Foster began his career around 2003 at Mopi, a club based in his hometown of Lae. The side had won the inaugural Papua New Guinea National Club Championship in 1976 and again in 1981. When Foster joined the club, the side had been readmitted to the local Lae Premier League, but the club finished bottom of the league.

For the 2004 season, Foster moved to Port Moresby to play for Cosmos in the Port Moresby Premier League. The club reached the Preliminary Final on 24 October, but lost to Rapatona, meaning they finished third.

=== Titles with Hekari United ===
Foster was part of the Hekari United squad for the 2008–09 Papua New Guinea National Soccer League. He scored the only goal in the side's 1–0 semi-final victory over Welgris Highlanders, before the playoffs were called off and Hekari declared champions as the best regular season team.

As champions, the club qualified for the 2009–10 OFC Champions League, and Foster was retained ahead of the new season. The club ended up winning the Champions League, becoming the first club outside of Australia and New Zealand to do so, and Foster was an unused substitute in the second leg of the final against Waitakere United. Hekari United went on to win the domestic title in the 2010–11 National Soccer League, beating Eastern Stars 4–0 in the Grand Final.

=== Domestic journeyman ===
In July 2010, it was announced that Foster was one of three players released by Hekari United to make way for new recruits ahead of the 2010 FIFA Club World Cup, denying Foster the chance to impress on the world stage. Foster joined current runners-up Eastern Stars for the following season, and the club finished second in the regular season of the 2010–11 National Soccer League, eventually taking on former club Hekari in the Grand Final. Stars went down 4–0.

Foster stayed with Eastern Stars for the 2011–12 season, and the club enjoyed another successful season, coming second in the regular season and reaching the Grand Final – and another match-up with Foster's former club Hekari – once again. However, the club suffered the same fate in the final, losing 3–0 to the champions.

For the 2013 season, Foster joined new club FC Port Moresby, and despite the club finishing third in the regular season, Foster found himself once again up against Hekari United in the Grand Final, and again the midfielder was left empty-handed, with Hekari securing a 3–0 victory.

With FC Port Moresby withdrawing from the 2014 National Soccer League, it looked like Foster would return to Eastern Stars, having trained with them early in January 2014, but he eventually went to Admiralty, another new franchise for the season. He was named captain for the season. In Foster's worst domestic season to date, the club finished fifth and failed to qualify for the playoffs. Foster stayed with the club for the 2015 season, but the club again finished fifth and outside of qualification for the playoffs.

=== Third title with Lae and overseas contracts ===
Ahead of the 2015–16 season, Foster moved to Rapatona, with whom he had occasionally joined up with in the local Port Moresby Premier League during previous NSL off-seasons. Despite losing four matches out of ten in the first stage, the club qualified for the four-team Champions Playoff in February 2016. However, ahead of the final stage, Foster moved to Lae City Dwellers, and the side qualified for the Grand Final behind Hekari United. After being defeated in all of his previous three Grand Finals, Foster picked up his third domestic title after Lae defeated Hekari 2–0 in the final. Foster was also part of the side's 2016 OFC Champions League campaign, scoring in the club's 5–4 defeat to Solomon Warriors.

With the problems surfacing domestic with the league split, Foster moved abroad for the first time in his career, joining Solomon Islands side Malaita Kingz in August 2016 for the entirety of the 2016 Solomon Islands S-League. The club finished fourth.

In 2017, Foster joined Geelong SC, competing in the Victorian State League Division 1, a league on the fourth level of the Australian league system. The side finished in second place, with Foster playing 16 matches for the club and scoring a single goal, before returning to Malaita Kingz for the second half of the 2017–18 S-League season.

=== Return to Papua New Guinea ===
Ahead of the 2018 Papua New Guinea National Soccer League, Foster joined Madang FC to boost their maiden OFC Champions League campaign. Foster played in all three of the club's group matches, but the side exited the competition without a point. Domestically, Madang finished in fourth place.

However, Foster secured a return to champions Lae City before the start of the 2019 season, and as such was part of the squad for the 2019 OFC Champions League. Foster played in all four of the side's matches as they reached the quarter-finals, playing the full 90 minutes in their 4–0 knockout defeat to Auckland City. However, Foster was able to pick up his fourth domestic title after Lae City defeated his former club Hekari United on penalties in the 2019 Grand Final. Foster scored the opening penalty in the shoot-out.

After a brief stint with Malaita Kingz again at the end of 2019, Foster rejoined Hekari United for the 2019–20 season.

== International career ==
=== U20s ===
Aged 17, Foster was called up to the U20s side for the 2002 OFC U-20 Championship in December 2002, which doubled as qualifying for the 2003 World Youth Championship. Foster played in both of the matches in the group stages before the side's elimination.

=== Senior squad ===
Still just 17, Foster was called up to the full senior squad in July 2003 for the 2003 South Pacific Games. Foster made his international debut on 7 July 2003 against Micronesia, scoring one goal in a 10–0 victory. It would be another eight years before he would play for the national side again.

Foster earned a recall to the senior squad for the 2011 Pacific Games. He played in all four of the country's fixtures, coming on as a substitute in all but one match: on 3 September 2011, he started and scored his second senior international goal in the 17–1 victory over Kiribati. Papua New Guinea failed to progress from the group stages of the competition.

Since then, Foster has played in all but two of Papua New Guinea's senior international matches: at the 2012 OFC Nations Cup, he started in all three of the nation's fixtures before their group stage elimination. In 2016, a busy year for the country, he started nine and was subbed on in the tenth of ten fixtures for the national team, including the five which saw them finish as 2016 OFC Nations Cup runners-up, having scored one of the goals in the crucial semi-final against the Solomon Islands. He played in all four of the side's qualifiers for the 2018 FIFA World Cup, and all but one of the country's five fixtures at the 2019 Pacific Games.

== Career statistics ==
=== International ===
As of 27 March 2022

Papua New Guinea
Year	Apps	Goals
2003	1	1
2011	4	1
2012	3	0
2014	1	0
2016	10	4
2017	4	1
2019	3	0
2022	4	0
Total	29	7

=== International goals ===
As of 20 July 2019. Scores and results list Papua New Guinea's result first.

International goals by date, venue, cap, opponent, score, result and competition
No.	Date	Venue	Cap	Opponent	Score	Result	Competition
1	7 July 2003	Churchill Park, Lautoka, Fiji	1	Federated States of Micronesia	4–0	10–0	2003 South Pacific Games
2	3 September 2011	Stade Boewa, Boulari Bay, New Caledonia	4	Kiribati	4–0	17–1	2011 Pacific Games
3	27 March 2016	Lawson Tama Stadium, Honiara, Solomon Islands	10	Solomon Islands	2–1	2–1	Friendly
4	5 June 2016	Sir John Guise Stadium, Port Moresby, Papua New Guinea	13	Samoa	1–0	8–0	2016 OFC Nations Cup
5	5 June 2016	Sir John Guise Stadium, Port Moresby, Papua New Guinea	13	Samoa	3–0	8–0	2016 OFC Nations Cup
6	8 June 2016	Sir John Guise Stadium, Port Moresby, Papua New Guinea	14	Solomon Islands	1–0	2–1	2016 OFC Nations Cup
7	9 June 2017	Lawson Tama Stadium, Honiara, Solomon Islands	21	Solomon Islands	1–2	2–3	2018 FIFA World Cup qualification

== Honours ==
Hekari United

- OFC Champions League: 2009–10
- Papua New Guinea National Soccer League: 2008–09, 2009–10

Lae City

- Papua New Guinea National Soccer League: 2015–16, 2019

Papua New Guinea

- OFC Nations Cup: runner-up, 2016
