= Norbert Hauata =

French Polynesian football referee

- Full name: Norbert Hauata
- Born: 8 June 1979 (age 47); French Polynesia

International
Years	League	Role
2008–	FIFA	Referee

Norbert Hauata (born 8 June 1979) is a football referee from French Polynesia.

Hauata lives in Moorea where he works in construction. He became a FIFA referee in 2008. His international career includes the 2011 FIFA U-17 World Cup, the 2012 OFC Nations Cup, 2014 FIFA World Cup and the 2018 FIFA World Cup.
