= Sir John Guise Stadium =

Athletics venue in Port Moresby, Papua New Guinea,

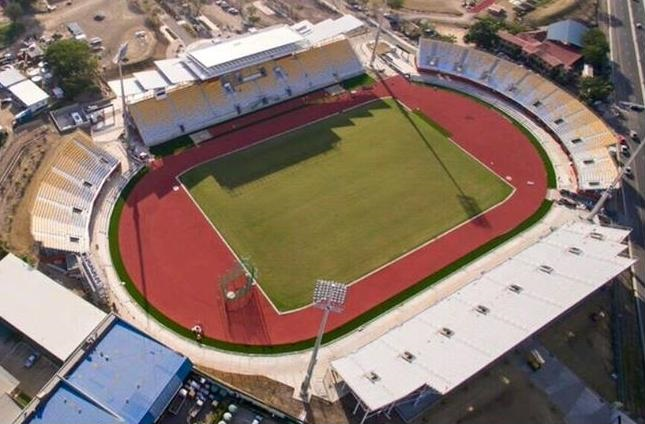
- Interactive map of Sir John Guise Stadium
- Location: Wards Strip, Port Moresby, Papua New Guinea
- Coordinates: 9.440893°S 147.185355°E
- Operator: PNG Sports Foundation
- Capacity: 15,000
- Surface: Grass

Construction
- Opened: 1991
- Renovated: 2012–2015
- Cost: 134M PGK (Renovation only)
- Architect: Norman Disney & Young (Renovation only)

Tenant
- Papua New Guinea national football team

The Sir John Guise Stadium is a multi-sport and athletics venue located in Port Moresby, the capital city of Papua New Guinea, and is part of the larger Sir John Guise Sports Precinct which also includes an indoor arena, beach volleyball/hockey court, and aquatics center. The stadium is named after Sir John Guise, the first Governor-General of Papua New Guinea.

== History ==
=== Foundation ===
The stadium was opened in 1991 to host the South Pacific Games that year. The stadium had an original capacity of approximately 5,000 spectators.

=== Redevelopment ===
On 27 September 2009, Papua New Guinea was chosen to host the 2015 Pacific Games. The stadium was chosen, along with Lloyd Robson Oval, Taurama Swimming Pool, and the new Konedobu Stadium, as venues for the games. Renovations to the facility included: renovation and expansion of the existing grandstand, new player facilities, offices and lounges, locker rooms, media centre, medical stations, an increase in seating from approximately 5,000 to 15,000 spectators, new broadcast quality lighting, public address system, scoreboard, and the installation of an IAAF-certified athletic track.

The stadium was officially opened and tested on 12 June 2015 with a Rugby league match between the PNG Hunters and the Souths Logan Magpies in the 14th round of the 2015 Queensland Cup. It also hosted the opening and closing ceremonies of the 2015 Pacific Games.

=== Other events ===
The stadium hosted all matches of the 2016 OFC Nations Cup, the regional championship which also served as qualification for the 2017 FIFA Confederations Cup and the second round of qualification for 2018 FIFA World Cup qualification.

The stadium was also one of the venues for the 2016 FIFA U-20 Women's World Cup.
