= 2017 OFC Champions League final =

- Event: 2017 OFC Champions League
Auckland City	Team Wellington
(New Zealand)	(New Zealand)
5	0
- on aggregate

First leg
Auckland City	Team Wellington
3	0
- Date: 30 April 2017
- Venue: Kiwitea Street, Auckland
- Referee: Nick Waldron (New Zealand)
- Attendance: 1,000

Second leg
Team Wellington	Auckland City
0	2
- Date: 7 May 2017
- Venue: David Farrington Park, Wellington
- Referee: Norbert Hauata (Tahiti)
- Attendance: 1,000

The 2017 OFC Champions League final was the final of the 2017 OFC Champions League, the 16th edition of the Oceania Cup, Oceania's premier club football tournament organized by the Oceania Football Confederation (OFC), and the 11th season under the current OFC Champions League name.

The final was contested in two-legged home-and-away format between two New Zealand teams, Auckland City and Team Wellington. The first leg was hosted by Auckland City at Kiwitea Street, Auckland on 30 April 2017, while the second leg was hosted by Team Wellington at David Farrington Park, Wellington on 7 May 2017. The winner would earn the right to represent the OFC at the 2017 FIFA Club World Cup, entering at the qualifying play-off round.

Auckland City won the first leg 3–0 and the second leg 2–0, to defeat Team Wellington 5–0 on aggregate and won the OFC Champions League seven consecutive seasons and nine seasons successively.

== Teams ==
In the following table, finals until 2006 were in the Oceania Club Championship era, since 2007 were in the OFC Champions League era.

Team	Previous finals appearances (bold indicates winners)
(New Zealand) Auckland City	8 (**2006**, **2009**, **2011**, **2012**, **2013**, **2014**, **2015**, **2016**)
(New Zealand) Team Wellington	2 (2015, 2016)

The final was a rematch of the previous two season's finals, which were both played as a single match. Auckland City had won both finals, 4–3 on penalties (1–1 after extra time) in 2015, and 3–0 in 2016.

Auckland City were the six-time defending champions. They had played in eight previous finals, winning all of them in 2006, 2009, 2011, 2012, 2013, 2014, 2015, and 2016.

This was the third OFC club final for Team Wellington, following the defeats to Auckland City in 2015 and 2016.

== Venues ==
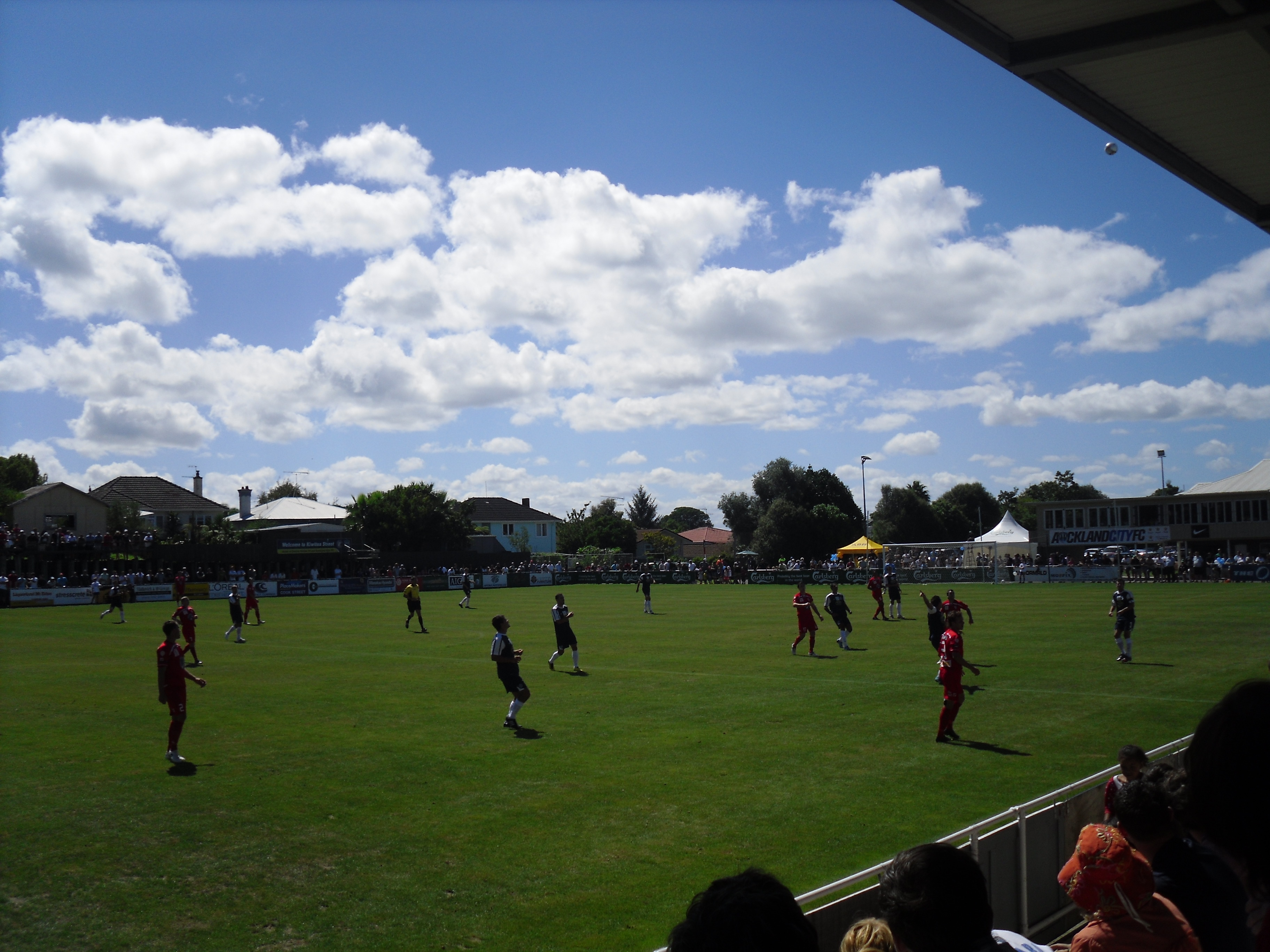
Kiwitea Street in Auckland, New Zealand, hosted the first leg.

David Farrington Park in Wellington, New Zealand hosted the second leg.

== Road to the final ==
Note: In all results below, the score of the finalist is given first (H: home; A: away).

(New Zealand) Auckland City				Round	(New Zealand) Team Wellington			
Opponent	Result			Group stage	Opponent	Result		
(Solomon Islands) Western United	2–1			Matchday 1	(Cook Islands) Puaikura	4–1		
(Papua New Guinea) Lae City Dwellers	2–0			Matchday 2	(New Caledonia) Hienghène Sport	3–1		
(Vanuatu) Malampa Revivors	11–0			Matchday 3	(Fiji) Ba	8–0		
**Group C winner**: Pos / Team / Pld / Pts; **1** / (New Zealand) Auckland City (H) / **3** / **9**; 2 / (Solomon Islands) Western United / 3 / **6**; 3 / (Papua New Guinea) Lae City Dwellers / 3 / **3**; 4 / (Vanuatu) Malampa Revivors / 3 / **0**; Source: OFC (H) Hosts				Final standings	**Group B winner**: Pos / Team / Pld / Pts; **1** / (New Zealand) Team Wellington / **3** / **9**; 2 / (New Caledonia) Hienghène Sport (H) / 3 / **4**; 3 / (Fiji) Ba / 3 / **4**; 4 / (Cook Islands) Puaikura / 3 / **0**; Source: OFC (H) Hosts			
Opponent	Agg.	1st leg	2nd leg	Knockout stage	Opponent	Agg.	1st leg	2nd leg
(French Polynesia) Tefana	4–0	2–0 (A)	2–0 (H)	Semi-finals	(New Caledonia) Magenta	9–3	2–2 (A)	7–1 (H)

== Format ==
The final was played on a home-and-away two-legged basis, with the order of legs decided by draw. If tied on aggregate, away goals were the first tie-breaker.

== Matches ==
=== First leg ===
30 April 2017
14:00 UTC+12

Auckland City (New Zealand)	3–0	(New Zealand) Team Wellington
Moreira 20' (pen.), 28'; De Vries 89'	Report

Kiwitea Street, Auckland
Attendance: 1,000
Referee: Nick Waldron (New Zealand)

**Auckland City**	**Team Wellington**

GK	1	(Spain) Eñaut Zubikarai
RB	9	(England) Darren White
CB	16	(South Korea) Kim Dae-wook
CB	5	(Spain) Ángel Berlanga (c)
LB	3	(Japan) Takuya Iwata
CM	4	(Croatia) Mario Bilen		(substituted off) 77'
CM	8	(Spain) Albert Riera	(yellow card) 24'
CM	6	(New Zealand) Cameron Howieson
RW	20	(Argentina) Emiliano Tade		(substituted off) 65'
CF	17	(Portugal) João Moreira		(substituted off) 90+2'
LW	14	(New Zealand) Clayton Lewis
Substitutes:
GK	18	(New Zealand) Danyon Drake
DF	13	(New Zealand) Alfie Rogers
DF	21	(New Zealand) Harry Edge
MF	7	(New Zealand) Reid Drake		(substituted on) 90+2'
MF	11	(Mexico) Fabrizio Tavano		(substituted on) 77'
MF	19	(Solomon Islands) Micah Lea'alafa
FW	10	(New Zealand) Ryan De Vries		(substituted on) 65'
Manager:
(Spain) Ramon Tribulietx

GK	1	(New Zealand) Scott Basalaj	(yellow card) 18'
CB	5	(England) Bill Robertson (c)
CB	2	(New Zealand) Justin Gulley
CB	4	(Argentina) Guillermo Moretti	(yellow card) 77'
RM	19	(New Zealand) Josh Margetts		(substituted off) 82'
CM	7	(Argentina) Leonardo Villa		(substituted off) 78'
CM	12	(New Zealand) Andy Bevin
CM	11	(Argentina) Mario Barcia
LM	15	(New Zealand) Joel Stevens
CF	18	(Chile) Nicolas Zambrano		(substituted off) 61'
CF	9	(England) Tom Jackson
Substitutes:
GK	23	(New Zealand) James McPeake
DF	6	(New Zealand) Taylor Schrijvers
DF	14	(New Zealand) Billy Scott
MF	21	(New Zealand) Niko Kirwan		(substituted on) 78'
FW	10	(New Zealand) Nathanael Hailemariam		(substituted on) 82'
FW	16	(England) Ben Harris	(yellow card) 83'	(substituted on) 61'
FW	17	(New Zealand) Sam Blackburn
Manager:
(England) José Figueira

Assistant referees:
Glen Lochrie (New Zealand)
Folio Moeaki (Tonga)
Fourth official:
Campbell-Kirk Waugh (New Zealand)

=== Second leg ===
7 May 2017
13:00 UTC+12

Team Wellington (New Zealand)	0–2	(New Zealand) Auckland City
	Report	De Vries 63'; Tade 76'

David Farrington Park, Wellington
Attendance: 1,000
Referee: Norbert Hauata (Tahiti)

**Team Wellington**	**Auckland City**

GK	1	(New Zealand) Scott Basalaj
CB	6	(New Zealand) Taylor Schrijvers		(substituted off) 43'
CB	2	(New Zealand) Justin Gulley
CB	5	(England) Bill Robertson (c)
RM	19	(New Zealand) Josh Margetts
CM	7	(Argentina) Leonardo Villa
CM	12	(New Zealand) Andy Bevin		(substituted off) 88'
CM	11	(Argentina) Mario Barcia	(yellow card) 25'	(substituted off) 78'
LM	15	(New Zealand) Joel Stevens
CF	16	(England) Ben Harris	(yellow card) 74'
CF	9	(England) Tom Jackson
Substitutes:
GK	23	(New Zealand) James McPeake
DF	4	(Argentina) Guillermo Moretti		(substituted on) 43'
DF	14	(New Zealand) Billy Scott
MF	21	(New Zealand) Niko Kirwan		(substituted on) 78'
FW	10	(New Zealand) Nathanael Hailemariam
FW	18	(Chile) Nicolas Zambrano
FW	17	(New Zealand) Sam Blackburn		(substituted on) 88'
Manager:
(England) José Figueira

GK	1	(Spain) Eñaut Zubikarai
RB	9	(England) Darren White	(yellow card) 58'
CB	16	(South Korea) Kim Dae-wook		(substituted off) 85'
CB	5	(Spain) Ángel Berlanga (c)
LB	3	(Japan) Takuya Iwata	(yellow card) 54'
CM	4	(Croatia) Mario Bilen
CM	8	(Spain) Albert Riera
CM	6	(New Zealand) Cameron Howieson
RW	20	(Argentina) Emiliano Tade	(yellow card) 73'	(substituted off) 87'
CF	17	(Portugal) João Moreira		(substituted off) 40'
LW	14	(New Zealand) Clayton Lewis
Substitutes:
GK	18	(New Zealand) Danyon Drake
DF	13	(New Zealand) Alfie Rogers
DF	23	(Serbia) Marko Đorđević		(substituted on) 85'
MF	7	(New Zealand) Reid Drake
MF	11	(Mexico) Fabrizio Tavano		(substituted on) 87'
MF	19	(Solomon Islands) Micah Lea'alafa
FW	10	(New Zealand) Ryan De Vries		(substituted on) 40'
Manager:
(Spain) Ramon Tribulietx

Assistant referees:
Philippe Revel (Tahiti)
Bertrand Brial (New Caledonia)
Fourth official:
Kader Zitouni (Tahiti)
