= 2016 OFC Champions League final =

- Event: 2016 OFC Champions League
Auckland City	Team Wellington
(New Zealand)	(New Zealand)
3	0
- Date: 23 April 2016
- Venue: QBE Stadium, Auckland
- Referee: Averii Jacques (Tahiti)
- Attendance: 1,500

The 2016 OFC Champions League final was the final of the 2016 OFC Champions League, the 15th edition of the Oceania Cup, Oceania's premier club football tournament organized by the Oceania Football Confederation (OFC), and the 10th season under the current OFC Champions League name.

The final was played between two New Zealand teams, Auckland City and Team Wellington. It was played at the QBE Stadium in Auckland on 23 April 2016. The winner earned the right to represent the OFC at the 2016 FIFA Club World Cup, entering at the qualifying play-off round.

Auckland City defeated Team Wellington 3–0 to win their sixth consecutive and eighth overall OFC club title.

== Background ==
The final was a rematch of the previous season's final, won by Auckland City 4–3 on penalties (1–1 after extra time).

Auckland City were the five-time defending champions. They have played in seven previous finals, winning all of them in 2006, 2009, 2011, 2012, 2013, 2014, and 2015.

This was the second OFC club final for Team Wellington, following last year's defeat to Auckland City.

== Road to final ==
The final stage of the 2016 OFC Champions League was played in Auckland, New Zealand.

Note: In all results below, the score of the finalist is given first.

(New Zealand) Auckland City		Round	(New Zealand) Team Wellington	
Opponent	Result	Group stage	Opponent	Result
(Solomon Islands) Solomon Warriors	4–0	Group stage	(Fiji) Suva	2–0
(Papua New Guinea) Lae City Dwellers	2–1	Group stage	(New Caledonia) Lössi	2–1
(Vanuatu) Amicale	3–1	Group stage	(Papua New Guinea) Hekari United	4–0
Group A winner: Pos / Team / Pld / W / D / L / GF / GA / GD / Pts; 1 / (New Zealand) Auckland City (H) / 3 / 3 / 0 / 0 / 9 / 2 / +7 / 9; 2 / (Vanuatu) Amicale / 3 / 2 / 0 / 1 / 7 / 3 / +4 / 6; 3 / (Solomon Islands) Solomon Warriors / 3 / 1 / 0 / 2 / 5 / 11 / −6 / 3; 4 / (Papua New Guinea) Lae City Dwellers / 3 / 0 / 0 / 3 / 5 / 10 / −5 / 0; Source: OFC (H) Hosts		Group stage	Group B winner: Pos / Team / Pld / W / D / L / GF / GA / GD / Pts; 1 / (New Zealand) Team Wellington / 3 / 3 / 0 / 0 / 8 / 1 / +7 / 9; 2 / (Papua New Guinea) Hekari United / 3 / 2 / 0 / 1 / 8 / 5 / +3 / 6; 3 / (Fiji) Suva / 3 / 1 / 0 / 2 / 3 / 6 / −3 / 3; 4 / (New Caledonia) Lössi / 3 / 0 / 0 / 3 / 3 / 10 / −7 / 0; Source: OFC	
(French Polynesia) Tefana	4–2	Semi-finals	(New Caledonia) Magenta	2–0

== Rules ==
The final was played as a single match. If tied after regulation, extra time and, if necessary, penalty shoot-out would be used to decide the winner.

== Match ==
23 April 2016
14:00 UTC+12

Auckland City (New Zealand)	3–0	(New Zealand) Team Wellington
Lea'alafa 2', 84'; Lewis 67'	Report

QBE Stadium, Auckland
Attendance: 1,500
Referee: Averii Jacques (Tahiti)

Auckland City	Team Wellington

GK	24	(Spain) Diego Rivas
DF	3	(Japan) Takuya Iwata
DF	5	(Spain) Ángel Berlanga (c)
DF	9	(England) Darren White
MF	4	(Croatia) Mario Bilen	(yellow card) 82'
MF	11	(New Zealand) Te Atawhai Hudson-Wihongi	(yellow card) 51'
MF	16	(South Korea) Kim Dae-wook
MF	19	(Solomon Islands) Micah Lea'alafa
FW	10	(New Zealand) Ryan De Vries
FW	14	(New Zealand) Clayton Lewis
FW	17	(Portugal) João Moreira		(substituted off) 86'
Substitutes:
GK	1	(New Zealand) Jacob Spoonley
GK	18	(New Zealand) Danyon Drake
DF	2	(Serbia) Marko Đorđević
DF	6	(New Zealand) Jesse Edge
DF	8	(New Zealand) Michael den Heijer
DF	13	(New Zealand) Alfie Rogers
MF	7	(New Zealand) Reid Drake
MF	12	(New Zealand) Nicolai Berry
MF	15	(New Zealand) Ivan Vicelich
FW	20	(Argentina) Emiliano Tade		(substituted on) 86'
FW	25	(Mexico) Fabrizio Tavano
Manager:
(Spain) Ramon Tribulietx

GK	1	(New Zealand) Scott Basalaj
DF	4	(New Zealand) Anthony Hobbs	(yellow card) 60'
DF	5	(England) Bill Robertson (c)
MF	6	(Wales) Chris Bale	(yellow card) 90'
MF	7	(Argentina) Leonardo Villa
FW	9	(New Zealand) Tom Jackson
FW	10	(Costa Rica) Luis Corrales		(substituted off) 88'
MF	11	(Argentina) Mario Barcia	(yellow card) 25'	(substituted off) 72'
MF	13	(New Zealand) Alex Feneridis	(yellow card) 36' (yellow-red card) 83'
FW	16	(England) Ben Harris		(substituted off) 89'
DF	17	(New Zealand) Fergus Neil
Substitutes:
GK	22	(New Zealand) Alex Carr
DF	2	(New Zealand) Taylor Hough
MF	3	(New Zealand) Steven Gulley		(substituted on) 72'
FW	12	(New Zealand) Andy Bevin		(substituted on) 89'
DF	14	(New Zealand) Billy Scott
MF	15	(New Zealand) Mark Jones
MF	18	(England) Saul Halpin		(substituted on) 88'
DF	19	(Scotland) Conner McGlinchey
MF	21	(New Zealand) Taylor Schhrijvers
Manager:
(New Zealand) Matt Calcott

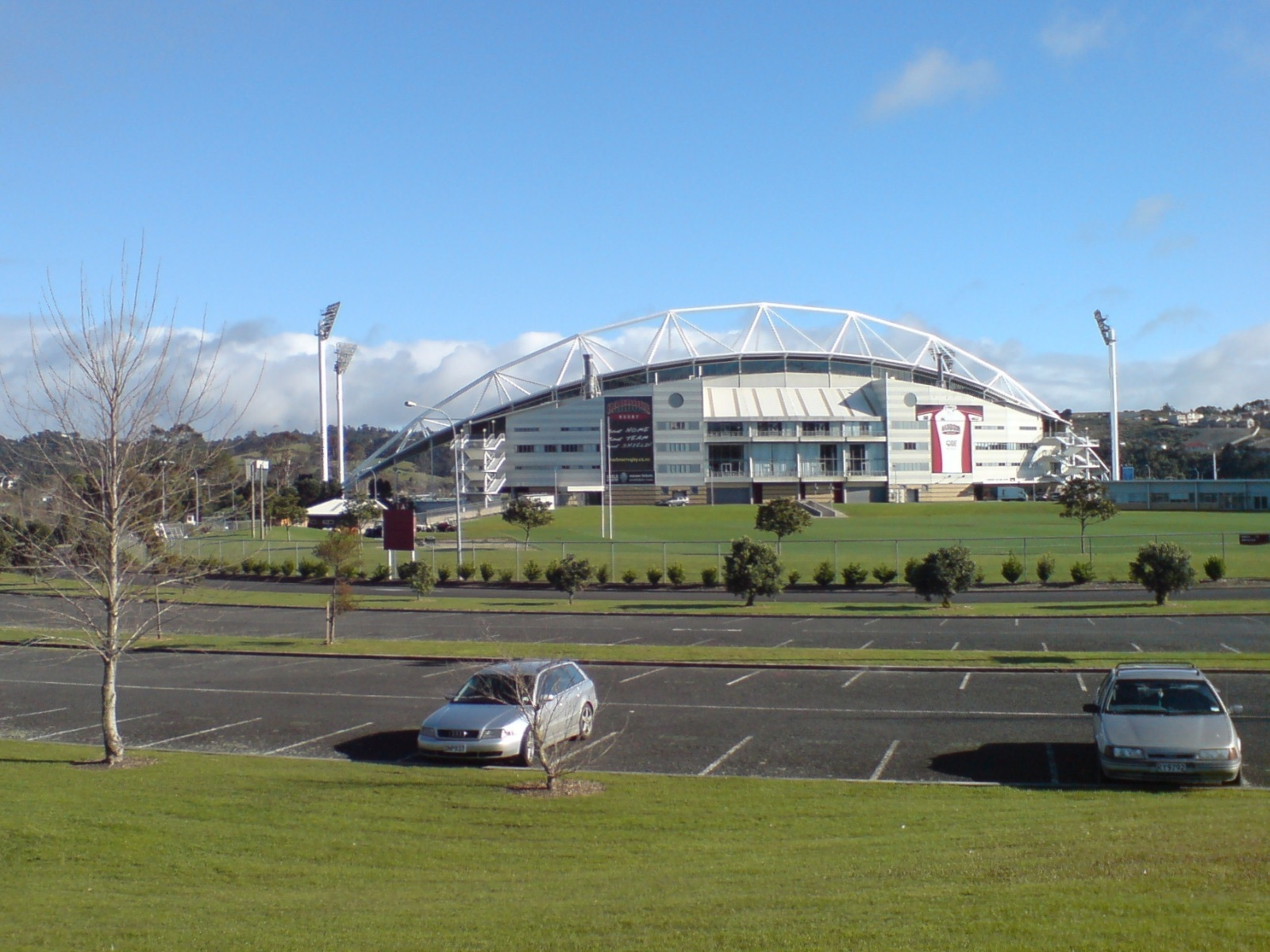
North Harbour Stadium (also known as QBE Stadium) in Auckland, New Zealand, hosted the final.

Assistant referees:
Tevita Makasini (Tonga)
Ravinesh Kumar (Fiji)
Fourth official:
Médéric Lacour (New Caledonia)
