= 2015 FIFA Club World Cup squads =

Each team in the 2015 FIFA Club World Cup had to name a 23-man squad (three of whom had to be goalkeepers) by the FIFA deadline of 30 November 2015. Injury replacements were allowed until 24 hours before the team's first match.

== América ==
Manager: (Mexico) Ignacio Ambríz

Note: Flags indicate national team as defined under FIFA eligibility rules; some limited exceptions apply. Players may hold more than one non-FIFA nationality.

No.	Pos.	Nation	Player
1	GK	MEX	Hugo González
2	DF	ARG	Paolo Goltz
3	DF	MEX	Gil Burón
4	DF	MEX	Erik Pimentel
6	DF	PAR	Miguel Samudio
8	MF	COL	Andrés Andrade
9	FW	ARG	Darío Benedetto
10	MF	PAR	Osvaldo Martínez
11	FW	ECU	Michael Arroyo
12	DF	PAR	Pablo Aguilar
13	GK	MEX	Luis Pineda
14	MF	ARG	Rubens Sambueza (captain)

No.	Pos.	Nation	Player
15	DF	MEX	Osmar Mares
16	FW	MEX	Diego Pineda
17	DF	USA	Ventura Alvarado
18	MF	MEX	Carlos Rosel
19	FW	MEX	Martín Zúñiga
21	MF	MEX	José Guerrero
22	MF	MEX	Paul Aguilar
23	GK	MEX	Moisés Muñoz
24	FW	MEX	Oribe Peralta
26	FW	MEX	Francisco Rivera
31	FW	COL	Darwin Quintero

== Auckland City ==
Manager: (Spain) Ramon Tribulietx

Note: Flags indicate national team as defined under FIFA eligibility rules; some limited exceptions apply. Players may hold more than one non-FIFA nationality.

No.	Pos.	Nation	Player
1	GK	NZL	Jacob Spoonley
2	DF	SRB	Marko Đorđević
3	DF	JPN	Takuya Iwata
4	MF	CRO	Mario Bilen
5	DF	ESP	Ángel Berlanga (captain)
6	DF	NZL	Jesse Edge
7	MF	ESP	Mikel Álvaro
8	DF	NZL	Michael den Heijer
9	DF	ENG	Darren White
10	FW	NZL	Ryan De Vries
11	MF	NZL	Te Atawhai Hudson-Wihongi
12	MF	NZL	Adam McGeorge

No.	Pos.	Nation	Player
13	DF	NZL	Alfie Rogers
14	FW	NZL	Clayton Lewis
16	DF	KOR	Kim Dae-wook
17	FW	POR	João Moreira
18	GK	NZL	Danyon Drake
19	FW	SOL	Micah Lea'alafa
20	FW	ARG	Emiliano Tade
21	FW	NZL	Nathaniel Hailemariam
22	FW	NZL	Andrew Milne
23	MF	NZL	Sam Burfoot
24	GK	NZL	Liam Anderson

== Barcelona ==
Manager: (Spain) Luis Enrique

Note: Flags indicate national team as defined under FIFA eligibility rules; some limited exceptions apply. Players may hold more than one non-FIFA nationality.

No.	Pos.	Nation	Player
1	GK	GER	Marc-André ter Stegen
2	DF	BRA	Douglas
3	DF	ESP	Gerard Piqué
4	MF	CRO	Ivan Rakitić
5	MF	ESP	Sergio Busquets
6	DF	BRA	Dani Alves
8	MF	ESP	Andrés Iniesta (captain)
9	FW	URU	Luis Suárez
10	FW	ARG	Lionel Messi
11	FW	BRA	Neymar
13	GK	CHI	Claudio Bravo
14	MF	ARG	Javier Mascherano

No.	Pos.	Nation	Player
15	DF	ESP	Marc Bartra
17	FW	ESP	Munir
18	DF	ESP	Jordi Alba
19	FW	ESP	Sandro
20	MF	ESP	Sergi Roberto
21	DF	BRA	Adriano
23	DF	BEL	Thomas Vermaelen
24	DF	FRA	Jérémy Mathieu
25	GK	ESP	Jordi Masip
26	MF	ESP	Sergi Samper
28	MF	ESP	Gerard Gumbau

== Guangzhou Evergrande Taobao ==
Manager: (Brazil) Luiz Felipe Scolari

Note: Flags indicate national team as defined under FIFA eligibility rules; some limited exceptions apply. Players may hold more than one non-FIFA nationality.

No.	Pos.	Nation	Player
3	DF	CHN	Mei Fang
5	DF	CHN	Zhang Linpeng
6	DF	CHN	Feng Xiaoting
7	FW	BRA	Alan
8	MF	BRA	Paulinho
9	FW	BRA	Elkeson
10	MF	CHN	Zheng Zhi (captain)
11	MF	BRA	Ricardo Goulart
12	MF	CHN	Wang Shangyuan
13	GK	CHN	Fang Jingqi
16	MF	CHN	Huang Bowen
17	MF	CHN	Liu Jian

No.	Pos.	Nation	Player
19	GK	CHN	Zeng Cheng
20	MF	CHN	Yu Hanchao
21	MF	CHN	Zhao Xuri
22	GK	CHN	Li Shuai
25	DF	CHN	Zou Zheng
27	MF	CHN	Zheng Long
28	DF	KOR	Kim Young-gwon
29	FW	CHN	Gao Lin
33	DF	CHN	Rong Hao
35	DF	CHN	Li Xuepeng
56	FW	BRA	Robinho

== TP Mazembe ==
Manager: (France) Patrice Carteron

Note: Flags indicate national team as defined under FIFA eligibility rules; some limited exceptions apply. Players may hold more than one non-FIFA nationality.

No.	Pos.	Nation	Player
1	GK	COD	Robert Kidiaba
2	DF	COD	Joël Kimwaki
4	DF	ZAM	Nathan Sinkala
5	DF	COD	Patient Mwepo
6	DF	MLI	Salif Coulibaly
7	FW	CIV	Roger Assalé
9	FW	TAN	Mbwana Samatta
10	MF	ZAM	Given Singuluma
11	FW	MLI	Adama Traoré
12	MF	COD	Bope Bokadi
14	DF	ZAM	Kabaso Chongo
16	MF	CIV	Christian Koffi

No.	Pos.	Nation	Player
17	FW	COD	Jonathan Bolingi
18	MF	ZAM	Rainford Kalaba
19	MF	GHA	Daniel Adjei
20	FW	GHA	Solomon Asante
21	GK	COD	Aimé Bakula
22	GK	CIV	Sylvain Gbohouo
23	MF	GHA	Gladson Awako
24	DF	GHA	Yaw Frimpong
27	DF	GHA	Richard Boateng
28	FW	TAN	Thomas Ulimwengu
29	MF	MLI	Boubacar Diarra

== River Plate ==
Manager: (Argentina) Marcelo Gallardo

Note: Flags indicate national team as defined under FIFA eligibility rules; some limited exceptions apply. Players may hold more than one non-FIFA nationality.

No.	Pos.	Nation	Player
1	GK	ARG	Marcelo Barovero (captain)
2	DF	ARG	Jonathan Maidana
3	DF	COL	Éder Álvarez Balanta
5	MF	ARG	Matías Kranevitter
6	DF	ARG	Leandro Vega
7	FW	URU	Rodrigo Mora
8	MF	URU	Carlos Sánchez
10	MF	ARG	Gonzalo Martínez
11	FW	ARG	Javier Saviola
12	GK	ARG	Augusto Batalla
13	FW	ARG	Lucas Alario
15	FW	ARG	Leonardo Pisculichi

No.	Pos.	Nation	Player
16	MF	ARG	Nicolás Bertolo
18	MF	URU	Camilo Mayada
19	FW	URU	Tabaré Viúdez
20	DF	ARG	Milton Casco
21	DF	ARG	Leonel Vangioni
22	FW	ARG	Sebastián Driussi
23	MF	ARG	Leonardo Ponzio
24	DF	ARG	Emanuel Mammana
25	DF	ARG	Gabriel Mercado
26	GK	ARG	Julio Chiarini
27	MF	ARG	Luís González

== Sanfrecce Hiroshima ==
Manager: (Japan) Hajime Moriyasu

Note: Flags indicate national team as defined under FIFA eligibility rules; some limited exceptions apply. Players may hold more than one non-FIFA nationality.

No.	Pos.	Nation	Player
1	GK	JPN	Takuto Hayashi
4	DF	JPN	Hiroki Mizumoto
5	DF	JPN	Kazuhiko Chiba
6	MF	JPN	Toshihiro Aoyama (captain)
8	MF	JPN	Kazuyuki Morisaki
9	FW	BRA	Douglas
11	FW	JPN	Hisato Satō
13	GK	JPN	Takuya Masuda
14	MF	CRO	Mihael Mikić
16	MF	JPN	Satoru Yamagishi
18	MF	JPN	Yoshifumi Kashiwa
19	DF	JPN	Sho Sasaki

No.	Pos.	Nation	Player
21	GK	JPN	Ryotaro Hironaga
22	FW	JPN	Yusuke Minagawa
24	MF	JPN	Gakuto Notsuda
25	MF	JPN	Yusuke Chajima
27	MF	JPN	Kohei Shimizu
28	MF	JPN	Takuya Marutani
29	FW	JPN	Takuma Asano
30	MF	JPN	Kosei Shibasaki
33	DF	JPN	Tsukasa Shiotani
34	DF	JPN	Soya Takahashi
37	MF	JPN	Kazuya Miyahara
