= 2017 Lunar New Year Cup =

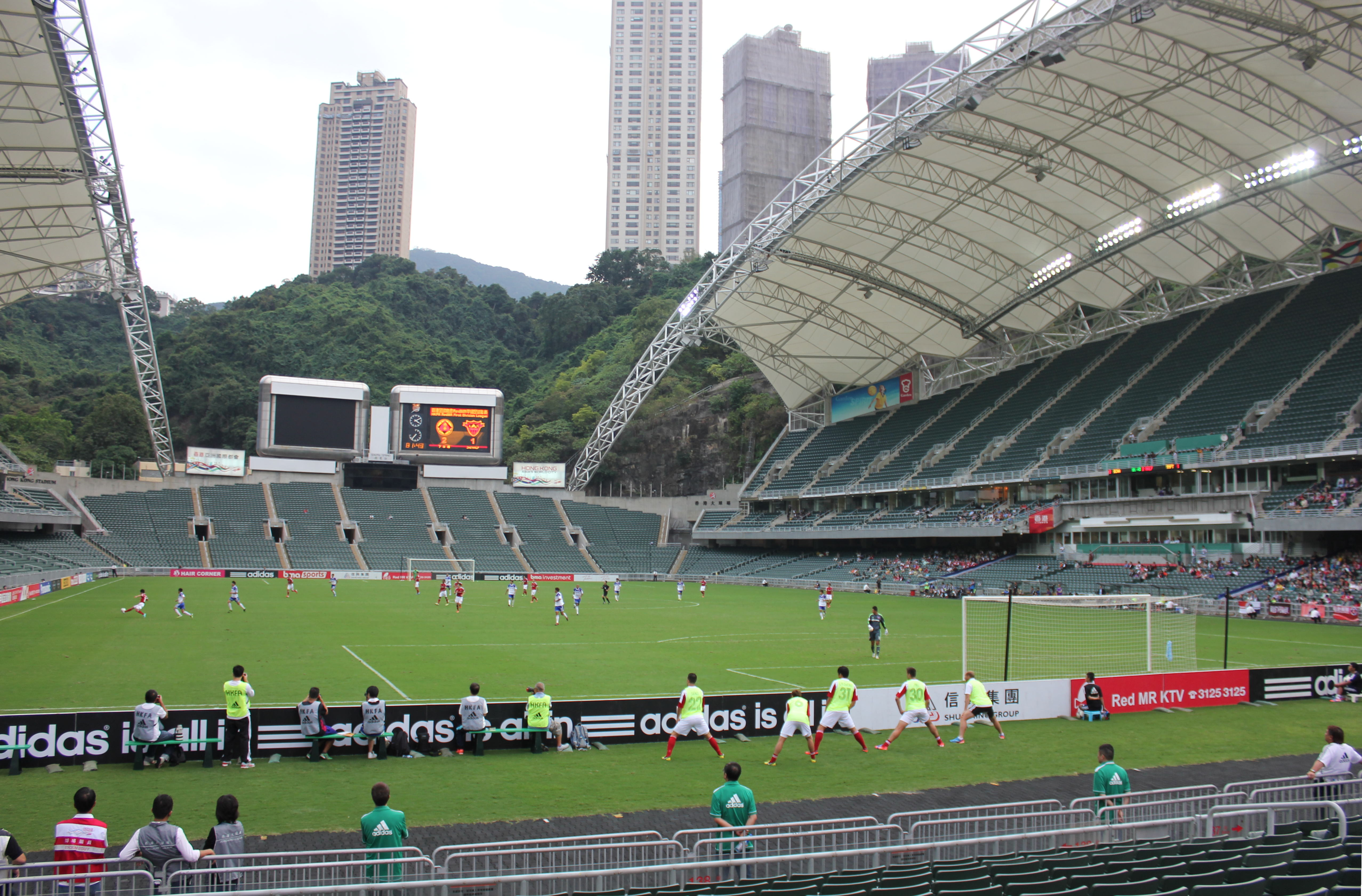
- Hong Kong Stadium

Tournament details
- Dates: 11–14 February 2017
- Teams: 4 (from 4 associations)

Final positions
- Champions: (New Zealand) Auckland City (1st title)
- Runners-up: (Hong Kong) Kitchee SC

Tournament statistics
- Matches played: 4
- Goals scored: 5 (1.25 per match)

The 91st 2017 Lunar New Year Cup is the annual edition of the Lunar New Year Cup, held in Hong Kong to celebrate the Lunar New Year in February 2017. This year, four teams were invited to participate, playing two games each in a knockout tournament. Australia under-23 withdrew before the tournament and were replaced by Auckland City.

== Teams ==
Four teams were invited to participate: Australia under-23 were initially scheduled to participate, however, Football Federation Australia withdrew the side following complaints from A-League clubs about losing players mid-season. They were replaced by Auckland City.

- (Hong Kong) Kitchee SC (hosts)
- (New Zealand) Auckland City
- (South Korea) FC Seoul
- (Thailand) Muangthong United

== Squads ==
=== Kitchee SC ===
Manager: (Hong Kong) Chu Chi Kwong

No.	Pos.	Player	Date of birth (age)	Caps	Club
1	GK	(Hong Kong) Wang Zhenpeng	5 May 1984 (aged 32)		(Hong Kong) Kitchee SC
2	DF	(Spain) Fernando Recio	17 December 1982 (aged 34)		Hong Kong Rangers FC
3	DF	(Spain) Dani Cancela	23 September 1981 (aged 35)		(Hong Kong) Kitchee SC
5	DF	(Hong Kong) Hélio	31 January 1986 (aged 30)		(Hong Kong) Kitchee SC
6	MF	(Germany) Zhi-Gin Lam	4 June 1991 (aged 25)		(Hong Kong) Kitchee SC
7	MF	(Brazil) Fernando	14 November 1986 (aged 30)		(Hong Kong) Kitchee SC
9	FW	(Serbia) Nikola Komazec	15 November 1987 (aged 29)		(Hong Kong) South China AA
10	MF	(Hong Kong) Lam Ka Wai	5 June 1985 (aged 31)		(Hong Kong) Kitchee SC
11	FW	(Hong Kong) Sandro	10 March 1987 (aged 29)		(Hong Kong) Kitchee SC
12	DF	(Hong Kong) Lo Kwan Yee(Captain)	9 October 1984 (aged 32)		(Hong Kong) Kitchee SC
13	DF	(Hong Kong) Li Ngai Hoi	15 October 1994 (aged 22)		Hong Kong Pegasus FC
16	MF	(Australia) Jared Lum	19 July 1992 (aged 24)		(Hong Kong) Kitchee SC
17	FW	(Spain) Rufino Segovia del Burgo	1 March 1985 (aged 31)		(Hong Kong) Kitchee SC
19	MF	(Hong Kong) Huang Yang	30 October 1983 (aged 33)		(Hong Kong) Kitchee SC
20	MF	(Canada) Matt Lam	10 September 1989 (aged 27)		(Hong Kong) Kitchee SC
21	DF	(Hong Kong) Tong Kin Man	10 January 1985 (aged 32)		(Hong Kong) Kitchee SC
22	MF	(Hong Kong) Emmet Wan	26 March 1992 (aged 24)		(Hong Kong) Kitchee SC
23	GK	(Hong Kong) Guo Jianqiao	20 July 1986 (aged 30)		(Hong Kong) Kitchee SC
24	MF	(Hong Kong) Ngan Cheuk Pan	22 January 1998 (aged 19)		(Hong Kong) Kitchee SC
29	FW	(Hong Kong) Harima Hirokane	31 January 1998 (aged 18)		(Hong Kong) Kitchee SC
31	DF	(Hong Kong) Law Tsz Chun	2 March 1997 (aged 19)		(Hong Kong) Kitchee SC
32	MF	(Hungary) Krisztián Vadócz	30 May 1985 (aged 31)		(Hong Kong) Kitchee SC
33	FW	(Hong Kong) Sham Kwok Keung	10 September 1985 (aged 31)		(Hong Kong) Kitchee SC
38	DF	(South Korea) Kim Dong-jin	29 January 1982 (aged 34)		(Hong Kong) Kitchee SC
88	MF	(Brazil) João Emir Porto Pereira	17 March 1989 (aged 27)		Hong Kong Pegasus FC
99	FW	(Brazil) Diego Higino	14 September 1986 (aged 30)		(Hong Kong) Yuen Long FC

=== Auckland City ===
Manager: (Spain) Ramon Tribulietx

No.	Pos.	Player	Date of birth (age)	Caps	Club
1	GK	(Spain) Eñaut Zubikarai	26 February 1984 (aged 32)		(New Zealand) Auckland City FC
3	DF	(Japan) Takuya Iwata	22 April 1983 (aged 33)		(New Zealand) Auckland City FC
4	DF	(Croatia) Mario Bilen	23 January 1985 (aged 32)		(New Zealand) Auckland City FC
5	DF	(Spain) Ángel Berlanga(Captain)	24 February 1987 (aged 29)		(New Zealand) Auckland City FC
6	MF	(New Zealand) Cameron Howieson	22 December 1994 (aged 22)		(New Zealand) Auckland City FC
7	MF	(New Zealand) Reid Drake	19 January 1996 (aged 21)		(New Zealand) Auckland City FC
8	MF	(Spain) Albert Riera	28 December 1983 (aged 33)		(New Zealand) Auckland City FC
9	DF	(England) Darren White	24 March 1989 (aged 27)		(New Zealand) Auckland City FC
10	FW	(New Zealand) Ryan De Vries	14 September 1991 (aged 25)		(New Zealand) Auckland City FC
11	MF	(Mexico) Fabrizio Tavano	16 August 1993 (aged 23)		(New Zealand) Auckland City FC
13	DF	(New Zealand) Alfie Rogers	22 June 1995 (aged 21)		(New Zealand) Auckland City FC
14	MF	(New Zealand) Clayton Lewis	12 February 1997 (aged 19)		(New Zealand) Auckland City FC
15	MF	(New Zealand) Mario Ilich	23 June 1995 (aged 21)		(New Zealand) Auckland City FC
16	DF	(South Korea) Kim Dae-wook	23 November 1987 (aged 29)		(New Zealand) Auckland City FC
17	FW	(Portugal) João Moreira	7 February 1986 (aged 30)		(New Zealand) Auckland City FC
18	GK	(New Zealand) Danyon Drake	12 December 1993 (aged 23)		(New Zealand) Auckland City FC
19	MF	(Solomon Islands) Micah Lea'alafa	1 June 1991 (aged 25)		(New Zealand) Auckland City FC
20	FW	(Argentina) Emiliano Tade	3 March 1988 (aged 28)		(New Zealand) Auckland City FC
21	DF	(New Zealand) Harry Edge	21 March 1994 (aged 22)		(New Zealand) Auckland City FC
22	DF	(New Zealand) Sean Cooper	16 October 1998 (aged 18)		(New Zealand) Auckland City FC
23	DF	(Serbia) Marko Đorđević	22 May 1983 (aged 33)		(New Zealand) Auckland City FC
25	FW	(New Zealand) Abdulla Al-Kalisy	7 January 1996 (aged 21)		(New Zealand) Auckland City FC

=== FC Seoul ===
Manager: (South Korea) Hwang Sun-hong

No.	Pos.	Player	Date of birth (age)	Caps	Club
1	GK	(South Korea) Yoo Hyun	1 August 1984 (aged 32)		(South Korea) FC Seoul
3	DF	(South Korea) Jung In-whan	15 December 1986 (aged 30)		(South Korea) FC Seoul
4	DF	(South Korea) Kim Dong-woo	5 February 1988 (aged 28)		(South Korea) FC Seoul
5	MF	(Spain) Osmar Barba	5 June 1988 (aged 28)		(South Korea) FC Seoul
6	MF	(South Korea) Ju Se-jong	30 October 1990 (aged 26)		(South Korea) FC Seoul
7	DF	(South Korea) Kim Chi-woo	11 November 1983 (aged 33)		(South Korea) FC Seoul
9	FW	(Montenegro) Dejan Damjanović	27 July 1981 (aged 35)		(South Korea) FC Seoul
10	FW	(South Korea) Park Chu-young	10 July 1985 (aged 31)		(South Korea) FC Seoul
13	MF	(South Korea) Go Yo-han	10 March 1988 (aged 28)		(South Korea) FC Seoul
14	MF	(South Korea) Cho Chan-ho	10 April 1986 (aged 30)		(South Korea) FC Seoul
15	MF	(South Korea) Kim Won-sik	5 November 1991 (aged 25)		(South Korea) FC Seoul
17	FW	(South Korea) Yun Il-lok	7 March 1992 (aged 24)		(South Korea) FC Seoul
18	DF	(South Korea) Shin Kwang-hoon	18 March 1987 (aged 29)		(South Korea) FC Seoul
19	MF	(South Korea) Hwang Ki-wook	10 June 1996 (aged 20)		(South Korea) FC Seoul
20	DF	(South Korea) Kim Won-gun	1 May 1992 (aged 24)		(South Korea) FC Seoul
21	DF	(South Korea) Sim Sang-min	21 May 1993 (aged 23)		(South Korea) FC Seoul
22	DF	(South Korea) Kim Kun-hoan	12 August 1986 (aged 30)		(South Korea) FC Seoul
23	DF	(South Korea) Sim Woo-yeon	3 April 1985 (aged 31)		(South Korea) FC Seoul
25	MF	(South Korea) Lee Seok-hyun	13 June 1990 (aged 26)		(South Korea) FC Seoul
30	MF	(South Korea) Kim Han-gil	21 June 1995 (aged 21)		(South Korea) FC Seoul
37	MF	(South Korea) Yoon Seung-won	11 February 1995 (aged 21)		(South Korea) FC Seoul
38	GK	(South Korea) Yang Han-been	30 August 1991 (aged 25)		(South Korea) FC Seoul
55	DF	(South Korea) Kwak Tae-hwi(Captain)	8 July 1981 (aged 35)		(South Korea) FC Seoul
88	DF	(South Korea) Lee Kyu-ro	20 August 1988 (aged 28)		(South Korea) FC Seoul

=== Muangthong United ===
Manager: (Thailand) Totchtawan Sripan

No.	Pos.	Player	Date of birth (age)	Caps	Club
1	GK	(Thailand) Kawin Thamsatchanan	26 January 1990 (aged 27)		(Thailand) Muangthong United F.C.
2	DF	(Thailand) Peerapat Notchaiya	4 February 1993 (aged 23)		(Thailand) Muangthong United F.C.
3	DF	(Thailand) Theerathon Bunmathan	6 February 1990 (aged 26)		(Thailand) Muangthong United F.C.
4	DF	(Spain) Pedro Mario Álvarez	2 February 1982 (aged 34)		(Thailand) Muangthong United F.C.
5	DF	(Japan) Naoaki Aoyama	18 July 1986 (aged 30)		(Thailand) Muangthong United F.C.
6	MF	(Thailand) Sarach Yooyen	30 May 1992 (aged 24)		(Thailand) Muangthong United F.C.
9	FW	(Spain) Xisco	26 June 1986 (aged 30)		(Thailand) Muangthong United F.C.
10	FW	(Thailand) Teerasil Dangda(Captain)	6 June 1988 (aged 28)		(Thailand) Muangthong United F.C.
11	FW	(Thailand) Adisak Kraisorn	1 January 1991 (aged 26)		(Thailand) Muangthong United F.C.
13	MF	(Thailand) Ratchapol Nawanno	28 April 1986 (aged 30)		(Thailand) Muangthong United F.C.
15	MF	(South Korea) Lee Ho	22 October 1984 (aged 32)		(Thailand) Muangthong United F.C.
16	MF	(Thailand) Sanukran Thinjom	12 September 1993 (aged 23)		(Thailand) Muangthong United F.C.
18	MF	(Thailand) Chanathip Songkrasin	5 October 1993 (aged 23)		(Thailand) Muangthong United F.C.
19	DF	(Thailand) Tristan Do	31 January 1993 (aged 23)		(Thailand) Muangthong United F.C.
20	MF	(Thailand) Wongsakorn Chaikultewin	16 September 1996 (aged 20)		(Thailand) Muangthong United F.C.
22	FW	(Thailand) Mongkol Tossakrai	9 May 1987 (aged 29)		(Thailand) Muangthong United F.C.
23	FW	(Brazil) Cleiton Silva	3 February 1987 (aged 29)		(Thailand) Muangthong United F.C.
25	DF	(Thailand) Adison Promrak	21 October 1993 (aged 23)		(Thailand) Muangthong United F.C.
26	DF	(Thailand) Suphan Thongsong	26 August 1994 (aged 22)		(Thailand) Muangthong United F.C.
28	GK	(Thailand) Prasit Padungchok	30 October 1982 (aged 34)		(Thailand) Muangthong United F.C.
34	MF	(Thailand) Wattana Playnum	19 August 1989 (aged 27)		(Thailand) Muangthong United F.C.

== Fixtures and results ==
All times are local, HKT (UTC+8).

=== Semi-finals ===
11 February 2017
15:00

Auckland City (New Zealand)	1–0	(South Korea) FC Seoul
Tade 45+1'	Report

Hong Kong Stadium
Attendance: 6,372
Referee: Chan Ming Siu

11 February 2017
17:30

Kitchee SC (Hong Kong)	1–1	(Thailand) Muangthong United
Higino 54'	Report	Teerasil 41'
Penalties
Emir (penalty scored); Komazec (penalty scored); Hélio (penalty scored); Lam (penalty scored); Rufino (penalty scored)	5–4	(penalty scored) Silva; (penalty scored) Sarach; (penalty scored) Theerathon; (penalty scored) Mongkol; (penalty missed) Teerasil

Hong Kong Stadium
Attendance: 6,372
Referee: Luk Kin Sun

=== Third Place Playoff ===
14 February 2017
15:00

Muangthong United (Thailand)	1–0	(South Korea) FC Seoul
Silva 3'	Report

Hong Kong Stadium
Attendance: 8,588
Referee: Liu Kwok Man

=== Final ===
14 February 2017
17:30

Kitchee SC (Hong Kong)	0–1	(New Zealand) Auckland City
	Report	Lewis 22'

Hong Kong Stadium
Attendance: 8,588
Referee: Ho Wai Sing

== Final standing ==
As per statistical convention in football, matches decided in extra time are counted as wins and losses, while matches decided by penalty shoot-outs are counted as draws.

Pos	Team	Pld	W	D	L	GF	GA	GD	Pts	Final result
1	(New Zealand) Auckland City	2	2	0	0	2	0	+2	6	Champions
2	(Hong Kong) Kitchee SC	2	0	1	1	1	2	−1	1	Runner-up
3	(Thailand) Muangthong United	2	1	1	0	2	1	+1	4	Third place
4	(South Korea) FC Seoul	2	0	0	2	0	2	−2	0	
