= 2015–16 New Zealand Football Championship =

ASB Premiership
- Season: 2015–16
- Champions: Team Wellington
- Premiers: Auckland City
- OFC Champions League: Team Wellington
- Matches: 59
- Goals: 236 (4 per match)
- Top goalscorer: Ryan De Vries (15 goals)
- Biggest home win: Waitakere United 6–0 Southern United (31 January 2016)
- Biggest away win: Wellington Phoenix 1–6 Team Wellington (26 February 2016)
- Highest scoring: Hawke's Bay United 5–5 Wellington Phoenix (13 December 2015)
- All statistics correct as of 10 March 2016.

The 2015–16 New Zealand Football Championship season (currently known as the ASB Premiership for sponsorship reasons) is the twelfth season of the NZFC since its establishment in 2004. Eight teams are involved this season, after Wanderers SC withdrew from the competition. Auckland City and Team Wellington will represent the ASB Premiership in the 2016 OFC Champions League after finishing Champions and Runners-up respectively in the 2014–15 competition.

== Clubs ==
Team	Location	Stadium	Capacity	Manager	Kit manufacturer	Shirt sponsor
Auckland City	Sandringham, Auckland	Kiwitea Street, QBE Stadium	3,250, 25,000	(Spain) Ramon Tribulietx	Nike	Hi-Chew (front) Trillian Trust Inc (Back) Carters (Back)
Canterbury United	Christchurch	ASB Football Park	9,000	(New Zealand) Willy Gerdsen	Samurai	Robbie's Bar and Bistro
Hawke's Bay United	Napier	Bluewater Stadium	5,000	(England) Brett Angell	Lotto Sport Italia	Kinetic Electrical
Southern United	Dunedin	Forsyth Barr Stadium	30,500	(Scotland) Mike Fridge	Lotto Sport Italia	Freshwater Solutions
Team Wellington	Wellington	David Farrington Park	3,000	(New Zealand) Matt Calcott	Nike	Exodus Health & Fitness Club
WaiBOP United	Hamilton	John Kerkhof Park	2,700	(Scotland) Peter Smith	Lotto Sport Italia	The Soccer Shop
Waitakere United	Whenuapai, Auckland	QBE Stadium	25,000	(New Zealand) Chris Milicich	Lotto Sport Italia	Jerry Clayton BMW (Front) Heritage Hotels (Back)
Wellington Phoenix	Wellington	Newtown Park	5,000	(England) Andy Hedge	Adidas	Huawei

=== Kits ===
Auckland City	Canterbury United	Hawke's Bay United	Southern United
Team Wellington	WaiBOP United	Waitakere United	Wellington Phoenix

== Regular season ==
=== League table ===
Pos	Team	Pld	W	D	L	GF	GA	GD	Pts	Qualification
1	Auckland City	14	12	2	0	43	12	+31	38	Qualification to the Champions League and Finals series
2	Hawke's Bay United	14	9	3	2	29	16	+13	30	Qualification to the Finals series
3	Team Wellington (C)	14	8	3	3	36	21	+15	27	Qualification to the Champions League and Finals series
4	Canterbury United	14	8	2	4	28	23	+5	26	Qualification to the Finals series
5	WaiBOP United	14	6	0	8	29	27	+2	18	Disbanded at end of season
6	Waitakere United	14	4	1	9	23	36	−13	13	
7	Wellington Phoenix	14	2	1	11	24	46	−22	7	
8	Southern United	14	1	0	13	11	42	−31	3	

Updated to match(es) played on 28 February 2016. Source: NZ Football
(C) Champions

=== Positions by round ===
Team ╲ Round	1	2	3	4	5	6	7	8	9	10	11	12	13	14
Auckland City	1	1	1	1	2	1	1	1	1	1	1	1	1	1
Hawke's Bay United	5	3	2	2	1	4	4	2	2	4	4	3	2	2
Team Wellington	3	5	3	4	3	2	3	4	5	3	3	2	3	3
Canterbury United	2	2	4	5	4	3	2	3	3	2	2	4	4	4
WaiBOP United	6	4	5	3	5	5	5	5	4	5	5	5	5	5
Waitakere United	4	6	7	8	8	6	6	6	6	6	6	6	6	6
Wellington Phoenix	8	7	8	6	6	7	7	7	7	7	7	7	7	7
Southern United	7	8	6	7	7	8	8	8	8	8	8	8	8	8

Leader and qualification to AFC Champions League Group stage
Qualification to Finals series

Source: NZ Football

=== Fixtures and results ===
The 2015–16 season sees every team play the other both home and away. Due to Auckland City's participation in the 2015 FIFA Club World Cup, several matches have been rescheduled.

==== Round 5 (rescheduled) ====
8 November 2015	Waitakere United	0–4	Auckland City	Auckland
Sunday, 16:35 NZDT; Match rescheduled due to Auckland City competing in the FIFA Club World Cup		Report	Moreira 76'; Lea'alafa 79', 87'; De Vries 84'	Stadium: QBE Stadium; Referee: John Rowbury

==== Round 1 ====
12 November 2015	Auckland City	1–1	Hawke's Bay United	Auckland
Thursday, 19:35 NZDT	Lea'alafa 11'	Report	Matsumoto 86'	Stadium: QBE Stadium; Referee: Chris Kerr

15 November 2015	Southern United	0–2	Waitakere United	Dunedin
Sunday, 14:00 NZDT		Report	Wylie 4'; Butler 56'	Stadium: Caledonian Ground; Referee: Peter Linney

15 November 2015	Wellington Phoenix	0–3	Canterbury United	Wellington
Sunday, 14:00 NZDT		Report	White 69', 72'; Chang 84'	Stadium: David Farrington Park; Referee: Matthew Conger

15 November 2015	WaiBOP United	2–3	Team Wellington	Hamilton
Sunday, 16:35 NZDT	Luque 15'; Jones 79'	Report	Bevin 31'; Harris 80'; Halpin 89'	Stadium: Gower Park; Referee: Cory Mills

==== Round 2 ====
19 November 2015	Waitakere United	1–5	WaiBOP United	Auckland
Thursday, 19:35 NZDT	Lovemore 45'	Report	Molony 13', 15', 86'; Jones 19' (pen.); Evans 43'	Stadium: QBE Stadium; Referee: Nick Waldron

22 November 2015	Hawke's Bay United	3–0	Southern United	Napier
Sunday, 13:00 NZDT	Kurimata 28'; Mason-Smith 53'; Matsumoto 61'	Report		Stadium: Bluewater Stadium; Referee: Antony Riley

22 November 2015	Wellington Phoenix	1–3	Auckland City	Wellington
Sunday, 14:00 NZDT	McGarry 65'	Report	De Vries 33'; Lewis 63'; Álvaro 75'	Stadium: Newtown Park; Referee: Campbell-Kirk Waugh

22 November 2015	Canterbury United	2–1	Team Wellington	Christchurch
Sunday, 16:35 NZDT	Hobbs 5' (o.g.); Kilkolly 72'	Report	Peverley 90+4' (pen.)	Stadium: ASB Football Park; Referee: Chris Kerr

==== Round 3 ====
26 November 2015	WaiBOP United	0–1	Hawke's Bay United	Taupō
Thursday, 19:35 NZDT		Report	Jones 84'	Stadium: Owen Delany Park; Referee: Campbell-Kirk Waugh

29 November 2015	Southern United	1–0	Wellington Phoenix	Dunedin
Sunday, 14:00 NZDT	Ridden 8'	Report		Stadium: Forsyth Barr Stadium; Referee: John Rowbury

29 November 2015	Team Wellington	3–1	Waitakere United	Wellington
Sunday, 14:00 NZDT	Musa 44', 75'; Dixon 77'	Report	Bowen 49'	Stadium: David Farrington Park; Referee: Matthew Conger

29 November 2015	Auckland City	4–1	Canterbury United	Auckland
Sunday, 16:35 NZDT	De Vries 36'; Moreira 54'; Álvaro 59'; Tade 83'	Report	De Jong 75'	Stadium: Kiwitea Street; Referee: Nick Waldron

==== Round 4 ====
3 December 2015	Wellington Phoenix	2–1	Waitakere United	Auckland
Thursday, 19:35 NZDT	Mata 40'; Ridenton 53'	Report	Bowen 16'	Stadium: Mount Smart Stadium; Referee: Campbell-Kirk Waugh

6 December 2015	Hawke's Bay United	2–0	Canterbury United	Napier
Sunday, 13:00 NZDT	Biss 52' (pen.); Watson 86'	Report		Stadium: Bluewater Stadium; Referee: John Rowbury

6 December 2015	Southern United	1–2	WaiBOP United	Dunedin
Sunday, 16:35 NZDT	Mobberley 61'	Report	Hoyle 10', 55'	Stadium: Forsyth Barr Stadium; Referee: Nick Waldron

==== Round 5 ====
10 December 2015	Canterbury United	2–0	WaiBOP United	Christchurch
Thursday, 19:05 NZDT	Kilkolly 47'; Messenger 84'	Report		Stadium: ASB Football Park; Referee: Peter Linney

13 December 2015	Hawke's Bay United	5–5	Wellington Phoenix	Napier
Sunday, 13:00 NZDT	Watson 47'; Chettleburgh 49'; Sole 68'; Mason-Smith 71', 90+2'	Report	Stevens 9', 57' (pen.); Mata 14', 23'; Rogerson 44'; Fox (yellow card) 31' (yellow-red card) 66'	Stadium: Bluewater Stadium; Referee: Chris Kerr

13 December 2015	Team Wellington	4–1	Southern United	Wellington
Sunday, 16:35 NZDT	Bale 50'; Harris 80', 85'; Hobbs 90+3'	Report	Ryder 45'	Stadium: David Farrington Park; Referee: Hayden McCabe

==== Round 6 ====
17 December 2015	Waitakere United	2–1	Hawke's Bay United	Auckland
Thursday, 19:35 NZDT	Butler 23' (pen.); Barnes 40' (pen.)	Report	Watson 6'	Stadium: QBE Stadium; Referee: Nick Waldron

20 December 2015	Team Wellington	3–2	Wellington Phoenix	Wellington
Sunday, 14:00 NZDT	Harris 36'; Peverley 45+1'; Musa 85'	Report	Powell 68' (pen.); Stevens 90+6'	Stadium: David Farrington Park; Referee: Antony Riley

20 December 2015	Southern United	1–3	Canterbury United	Invercargill
Sunday, 14:00 NZDT	Fitzpatrick 28'	Report	de Jong 33', 86'; Kaua 80'	Stadium: Rugby Park Stadium; Referee: Campbell-Kirk Waugh

20 December 2015	WaiBOP United	0–2	Auckland City	Hamilton
Sunday, 16:35 NZDT		Report	Kim 18'; Tade 50'	Stadium: FMG Stadium; Referee: John Rowbury

==== Round 7 ====
9 January 2016	Wellington Phoenix	3–4	WaiBOP United	Wellington
Saturday, 14:00 NZDT	Rogerson 46'; Blake 47'; Evans 81'	Report	Tinsley 52' (pen.), 90+6'; Hoyle 64'; Ilich 69'	Stadium: Newtown Park; Referee: Nick Waldron

10 January 2016	Hawke's Bay United	2–2	Team Wellington	Napier
Sunday, 13:00 NZDT	Liddicoat 48'; Taye 56'	Report	Harris 6', 60' (pen.)	Stadium: Bluewater Stadium; Referee: Campbell-Kirk Waugh

10 January 2016	Canterbury United	2–0	Waitakere United	Christchurch
Sunday, 14:00 NZDT	de Jong 29'; Clapham 34' (pen.)	Report		Stadium: ASB Football Park; Referee: Matthew Conger

10 January 2016	Auckland City	3–1	Southern United	Auckland
Sunday, 16:35 NZDT	Tade 37', 63'; Lewis 77'	Report	Rodeka 52'	Stadium: Kiwitea Street; Referee: Peter Linney

==== Round 8 ====
14 January 2016	WaiBOP United	3–0	Southern United	Hamilton
Thursday, 19:35 NZDT	Tinsley 37'; Cochran 62'; Hoyle 87'	Report		Stadium: FMG Stadium; Referee: Antony Riley

17 January 2016	Canterbury United	1–3	Hawke's Bay United	Christchurch
Sunday, 13:00 NZDT	Kilkolly 56'	Report	Biss 2'; Watson 61', 82'	Stadium: ASB Football Park; Referee: John Rowbury

17 January 2016	Team Wellington	2–2	Auckland City	Wellington
Sunday, 14:00 NZDT	Robertson 5'; Harris 12' (pen.)	Report	Tade 9', 23'; Spoonley (yellow card) 14' (yellow-red card) 67'	Stadium: David Farrington Park; Referee: Nick Waldron

17 January 2016	Waitakere United	4–1	Wellington Phoenix	Auckland
Sunday, 16:35 NZDT	Manickum 23'; Lovemore 45+1'; Bowen 90'; Barnes 90+2'	Report	Blake 15'	Stadium: QBE Stadium; Referee: Cory Mills

==== Round 9 ====
21 January 2016	WaiBOP United	5–0	Waitakere United	Hamilton
Thursday, 19:35 NZDT	Hoyle 5', 40', 89'; Jones 29'; Issa 90'	Report	Coombes (yellow card) 44' (yellow-red card) 90+5'	Stadium: FMG Stadium; Referee: John Rowbury

24 January 2016	Southern United	1–2	Hawke's Bay United	Dunedin
Sunday, 12:00 NZDT	Jackson 75'	Report	Mason-Smith 45'; Ifill 82'; Milne (red card) 86'	Stadium: Forsyth Barr Stadium; Referee: Chris Kerr

24 January 2016	Team Wellington	2–2	Canterbury United	Wellington
Sunday, 14:00 NZDT	Bale 66' (pen.), 90+4' (pen.)	Report	Kilkolly 32'; Terris 87'; Chang (red card) 90+3'	Stadium: David Farrington Park; Referee: Matthew Conger

24 January 2016	Auckland City	4–2	Wellington Phoenix	Auckland
Sunday, 16:35 NZDT	Moreira 11' (pen.), 21', 42'; De Vries 40'	Report	Cahill-Fleury 22', 78'	Stadium: Kiwitea Street; Referee: Hayden McCabe

==== Round 4 (rescheduled) ====
28 January 2016	Auckland City	1–0	Team Wellington	Auckland
Thursday, 19:35 NZDT; Match rescheduled due to Auckland City competing in the FIFA Club World Cup	Lewis 82'			Stadium: QBE Stadium; Referee: Chris Kerr

==== Round 10 ====
30 January 2016	Canterbury United	3–1	Wellington Phoenix	Christchurch
Saturday, 16:15 NZDT	White 29'; Clapham 44' de Jong 82'	Report	Singh 40'	Stadium: AMI Stadium; Referee: Nick Waldron

31 January 2016	Team Wellington	3–1	WaiBOP United	Wellington
Sunday, 14:00 NZDT	Lissette 3' (o.g.); Harris 74'; Corrales 80'	Report	Tinsley 82'	Stadium: David Farrington Park; Referee: Campbell-Kirk Waugh

31 January 2016	Hawke's Bay United	1–3	Auckland City	Napier
Sunday, 15:00 NZDT	Watson 30'	Report	De Vries 5', 31'; Lea'alafa 34'	Stadium: Bluewater Stadium; Referee: John Rowbury

31 January 2016	Waitakere United	6–0	Southern United	Auckland
Sunday, 16:35 NZDT	Lovemore 25', 33', 58'; Porter 41'; Butler 89'; Manickum 89'	Report		Stadium: QBE Stadium; Referee: Hayden McCabe

==== Round 11 ====
4 February 2016	Auckland City	5–1	Waitakere United	Auckland
Thursday, 19:35 NZDT	De Vries 10', 49', 78'; White 20'; Lewis 66'	Report	O'Regan 40'	Stadium: QBE Stadium; Referee: Nick Waldron

6 February 2016	Wellington Phoenix	0–2	Hawke's Bay United	Wellington
Saturday, 13:00 NZDT		Report	Mason-Smith 6', 89'	Stadium: Newtown Park; Referee: Campbell-Kirk Waugh

7 February 2016	Southern United	0–3	Team Wellington	Dunedin
Sunday, 14:00 NZDT	Kelly (yellow card) 3' (yellow-red card) 16'	Report	Feneridis 34'; Harris 37', 84'	Stadium: Forsyth Barr Stadium; Referee: John Rowbury

7 February 2016	WaiBOP United	2–3	Canterbury United	Hamilton
Sunday, 16:35 NZDT	Ilich 67'; Issa 89'	Report	Kilkolly 4' de Jong 32'; Messenger 90+3'	Stadium: FMG Stadium; Referee: Chris Kerr

==== Round 12 ====
11 February 2016	Waitakere United	2–4	Team Wellington	Auckland
Thursday, 19:35 NZDT	Peverley 32' (o.g.); Lovemore 88'	Report	Harris 8', 12', 36'; Peverley 57' (pen.)	Stadium: QBE Stadium

13 February 2016	Wellington Phoenix	4–3	Southern United	Wellington
Saturday, 13:00 NZDT	McGarry 2', 22', 33'; Khouchaba 37'	Report	French 12', 87'; Williams 48'	Stadium: David Farrington Park

14 February 2016	Hawke's Bay United	2–0	WaiBOP United	Napier
Sunday, 15:00 NZDT	Kurimata 83'; Ifill 90'	Report		Stadium: Bluewater Stadium

14 February 2016	Canterbury United	Postponed	Auckland City	Christchurch
Sunday, 16:35 NZDT				Stadium: ASB Football Park

==== Round 13 ====
18 February 2016	Southern United	0–4	Auckland City	Dunedin
Thursday, 19:35 NZDT		Report	Moreira 37' (pen.), 82'; De Vries 47'; Milne 89'	Stadium: Forsyth Barr Stadium

20 February 2016	WaiBOP United	4–2	Wellington Phoenix	Mount Maunganui
Saturday, 13:00 NZDT	Morris 26'; Hoyle 36', 43'; Ilich 83'	Report	Rogerson 64'; Whyte 89'	Stadium: Links Avenue

21 February 2016	Team Wellington	0–2	Hawke's Bay United	Wellington
Sunday, 15:00 NZDT	Peverley (yellow card) 75' (yellow-red card)	Report	Biss 6'; Kurimata 74'	Stadium: David Farrington Park

21 February 2016	Waitakere United	2–2	Canterbury United	Auckland
Sunday, 16:35 NZDT	Berry 39'; Lovemore 51'	Report	Terris 79'; Clapham 84' (pen.)	Stadium: QBE Stadium

==== Round 12 (rescheduled) ====
24 February 2016	Canterbury United	1–3	Auckland City	Christchurch
Wednesday, 18:00 NZDT; Match rescheduled due to original postponement on 14 February, due to Christchurch earthquake	Clapham 19' (pen.)	Report	Tade 60'; Lea'alafa 66'; De Vries 81'	Stadium: ASB Football Park

==== Round 14 ====
26 February 2016	Wellington Phoenix	1–6	Team Wellington	Wellington
Friday, 16:15 NZDT	McGarry 60'	Report	Villa 7'; Wood 23' (o.g.); Barcia 25', 48'; Jackson 83', 87'	Stadium: Westpac Stadium

28 February 2016	Canterbury United	3–2	Southern United	Christchurch
Sunday, 14:00 NZDT	de Jong 60'; Clapham 85' (pen.); Ogilvie 90+4'	Report	French 16'; Day 67'	Stadium: ASB Football Park

28 February 2016	Hawke's Bay United	2–1	Waitakere United	Napier
Sunday, 14:00 NZDT	Biss 15'; Ifill 90+5' (pen.)	Report	Lovemore 15'	Stadium: Bluewater Stadium

28 February 2016	Auckland City	4–1	WaiBOP United	Auckland
Sunday, 16:35 NZDT	Lea'alafa 24', 64'; De Vries 61', 71'; Kim (yellow card) 55' (yellow-red card)	Report	Hoyle 54'	Stadium: Kiwitea Street

== Finals series ==
=== Semi-finals ===
6 March 2016	Auckland City	2–1	Canterbury United	Auckland
Sunday, 14:05 NZDT	De Vries 3', 70'	Report	Collett 41'	Stadium: Kiwitea Street

6 March 2016	Hawke's Bay United	1–3	Team Wellington	Napier
Sunday, 16:35 NZDT	Matsumoto 10'	Report	Corrales 41'; Jackson 41' (pen.); Vieira 79'	Stadium: Bluewater Stadium

=== Grand final ===
10 March 2016	Auckland City	2–4 (a.e.t.)	Team Wellington	Auckland
Thursday, 19:35 NZST	Moreira 68' (pen.); Kim 81'	Report	Jackson 52', 99'; Peverley 88' (pen.); Harris 94'	Stadium: QBE Stadium; Attendance: 1,508; Referee: Matt Conger

== Statistics ==
=== Top scorers ===
As of matches played on 10 March 2016

Rank	Player	Club	Goals
1	(New Zealand) Ryan De Vries	Auckland City	15
2	(England) Ben Harris	Team Wellington	14
3	(England) Stephen Hoyle	WaiBOP United	10
4	(Portugal) João Moreira	Auckland City	8
4	(New Zealand) Sean Lovemore	Waitakere United	8
6	(Solomon Islands) Micah Lea'alafa	Auckland City	7
6	(Argentina) Emiliano Tade	Auckland City	7
6	(New Zealand) Andre de Jong	Canterbury United	7
9	(England) Sam Mason-Smith	Hawke's Bay United	6
9	(New Zealand) Hamish Watson	Hawke's Bay United	6

=== Own goals ===
Player	Club	Against	Round
(New Zealand) Anthony Hobbs	Team Wellington	Canterbury United	2
(New Zealand) Tyler Lissette	WaiBOP United	Team Wellington	10
(New Zealand) Cole Peverley	Team Wellington	Waitakere United	12
(New Zealand) Liam Wood	Wellington Phoenix	Team Wellington	14
