= 2015 OFC Champions League final =

- Event: 2014–15 OFC Champions League
Auckland City	Team Wellington
(New Zealand)	(New Zealand)
1	1
- after extra time Auckland City won 4–3 on penalties
- Date: 26 April 2015
- Venue: National Stadium, Suva
- Referee: Norbert Hauata (Tahiti)

The 2015 OFC Champions League final was the final of the 2014–15 OFC Champions League, the 14th edition of the Oceania Cup, Oceania's premier club football tournament organized by the Oceania Football Confederation (OFC), and the 9th season under the current OFC Champions League name.

The final was played between two New Zealand teams, Auckland City and Team Wellington. It was played at the National Stadium in Suva on 26 April 2015. The winner earned the right to represent the OFC at the 2015 FIFA Club World Cup, entering at the qualifying play-off round.

Auckland City defeated Team Wellington 4–3 on penalties (1–1 after extra time) to win their fifth consecutive and seventh overall OFC club title.

== Background ==
This was the second final to be played as a single match during the OFC Champions League era. The previous single-match final, in 2013, was also the only previous final to feature two New Zealand teams, where Auckland City defeated Waitakere United.

Auckland City were the four-time defending champions. They had played in six previous finals, winning all of them in 2006, 2009, 2011, 2012, 2013, and 2014. For Team Wellington, this was the first time that they reach an OFC club final.

On 16 March 2014, Auckland City defeated Team Wellington 1–0 in the 2013–14 ASB Premiership grand final to be crowned domestic champions. Both teams qualified for the 2014–15 OFC Champions League as they also finished first and second in the regular season. On 19 October 2014, Team Wellington defeated Auckland City 4–3 on penalties (2–2 full-time) in the season-opening ASB Charity Cup. In the 2014–15 ASB Premiership, both teams again finished first and second in the regular season, with the two teams each winning their home match against their final opponent (Team Wellington 4–0 Auckland City on 29 November 2014; Auckland City 3–0 Team Wellington on 15 February 2015).

== Road to final ==
The final stage of the 2014–15 OFC Champions League was played in Fiji.

Note: In all results below, the score of the finalist is given first.

(New Zealand) Auckland City		Round	(New Zealand) Team Wellington	
Opponent	Result	Group stage	Opponent	Result
(Fiji) Suva	3–0	Group stage	(French Polynesia) Tefana	2–1
(Solomon Islands) Western United	3–0	Group stage	(Papua New Guinea) Hekari United	2–0
(Vanuatu) Tafea	3–0	Group stage	(Vanuatu) Amicale	3–2
Group B winner: Pos / Team / Pld / W / D / L / GF / GA / GD / Pts / Qualification; 1 / (New Zealand) Auckland City / 3 / 3 / 0 / 0 / 9 / 0 / +9 / 9 / Advance to semi-finals; 2 / (Vanuatu) Amicale / 3 / 2 / 0 / 1 / 4 / 5 / −1 / 6; 3 / (Fiji) Suva / 3 / 1 / 0 / 2 / 5 / 7 / −2 / 3; 4 / (Solomon Islands) Western United / 3 / 0 / 0 / 3 / 1 / 7 / −6 / 0; Source: OFC		Group stage	Group C winner: Pos / Team / Pld / W / D / L / GF / GA / GD / Pts / Qualification; 1 / (New Zealand) Team Wellington / 3 / 3 / 0 / 0 / 7 / 3 / +4 / 9 / Advance to semi-finals; 2 / (Papua New Guinea) Hekari United / 3 / 2 / 0 / 1 / 6 / 6 / 0 / 6; 3 / (Vanuatu) Tafea / 3 / 0 / 1 / 2 / 5 / 7 / −2 / 1; 4 / (French Polynesia) Tefana / 3 / 0 / 1 / 2 / 4 / 6 / −2 / 1; Source: OFC	
(New Caledonia) Gaïtcha	1–0	Semi-finals	(Fiji) Ba	2–0

== Rules ==
The final was played as a single match. If tied after regulation, extra time and, if necessary, penalty shoot-out would be used to decide the winner.

== Match ==
Auckland City took the lead in the 14th minute through João Moreira's penalty, but Team Wellington equalized in the 79th minute, when Ian Hogg hammered in a loose ball after a free kick. The match went to extra time, and Auckland City missed the chance to retake the lead when Michael O'Keeffe saved Darren White's penalty, and the match ended 1–1, meaning the title had to be decided by a penalty shoot-out.

In the penalty shoot-out, both teams missed one penalty in the first four rounds, with Tamati Williams saving from Luis Corrales and O'Keeffe saving from Ángel Berlanga. In the fifth round, Hogg sent his penalty over the bar, and Kim Dae-wook converted his shot to give Auckland City the title.

26 April 2015
19:00 UTC+12

Auckland City (New Zealand)	1–1 (a.e.t.)	(New Zealand) Team Wellington
Moreira 14' (pen.)	Report	Hogg 79'
Penalties
Đorđević (penalty scored); Berlanga (penalty missed); McGeorge (penalty scored); Browne (penalty scored); Kim (penalty scored)	4–3	(penalty scored) Feneridis; (penalty missed) Corrales; (penalty scored) Peverley; (penalty scored) Gulley; (penalty missed) Hogg

National Stadium, Suva
Referee: Norbert Hauata (Tahiti)

Auckland City	Team Wellington

GK	1	(New Zealand) Tamati Williams
DF	2	(Serbia) Marko Đorđević
DF	3	(Japan) Takuya Iwata
MF	4	(Croatia) Mario Bilen	(yellow card) 108'
DF	5	(Spain) Ángel Berlanga
DF	9	(England) Darren White
FW	10	(New Zealand) Ryan De Vries
MF	13	(Spain) Iván Carril	(yellow card) 41'	(substituted off) 89'
MF	15	(New Zealand) Ivan Vicelich (c)		(substituted off) 98'
FW	17	(Portugal) João Moreira		(substituted off) 85'
FW	19	(Papua New Guinea) David Browne	(yellow card) 78'
Substitutes:
MF	8	(New Zealand) Anthony Hobbs
MF	11	(New Zealand) Cameron Lindsay
MF	12	(New Zealand) Adam McGeorge		(substituted on) 98'
MF	14	(New Zealand) Colin Murphy
MF	16	(South Korea) Kim Dae-wook		(substituted on) 89'
GK	18	(New Zealand) Danyon Drake
FW	20	(Spain) Óscar García
FW	21	(Spain) Gustavo Souto		(substituted on) 85'
DF	22	(New Zealand) Andrew Milne
MF	23	(New Zealand) Sam Burfoot
GK	24	(New Zealand) Jacob Spoonley
MF	25	(New Zealand) Michael den Heijer
Manager:
(Spain) Ramon Tribulietx

GK	1	(New Zealand) Michael O'Keeffe
FW	2	(New Zealand) Tom Jackson		(substituted off) 33'
DF	3	(New Zealand) Aaron Scott		(substituted off) 78'
DF	5	(England) Bill Robertson
MF	8	(New Zealand) Cole Peverley (c)
FW	10	(Costa Rica) Luis Corrales
MF	11	(New Zealand) Michael Gwyther	(yellow card) 33'
DF	12	(New Zealand) Ian Hogg	(yellow card) 73'
MF	13	(New Zealand) Alex Feneridis	(yellow card) 38'
MF	16	(New Zealand) Justin Gulley
MF	19	(Wales) Chris Bale	(red card) 112'
Substitutes:
FW	6	(New Zealand) Sean Lovemore	(yellow card) 98'	(substituted on) 33'
DF	15	(New Zealand) Tim Myers		(substituted on) 78'
MF	18	(New Caledonia) Mickaël Partodikromo
MF	20	(New Zealand) Adam Cowan
GK	22	(New Zealand) Daniel Clarke
GK	23	(New Zealand) Alex Carr
FW	9	(New Zealand) Jarrod Smith (injured)
MF	17	(New Zealand) Jake Butler (injured)
DF	4	(New Zealand) Tyler Lissette (absent)
MF	7	(Solomon Islands) Henry Fa'arodo (absent)
MF	14	(New Zealand) Cory Chettleburgh (absent)
DF	21	(New Zealand) Tamupiwa Dimairo (absent)
Manager:
(New Zealand) Matt Calcott

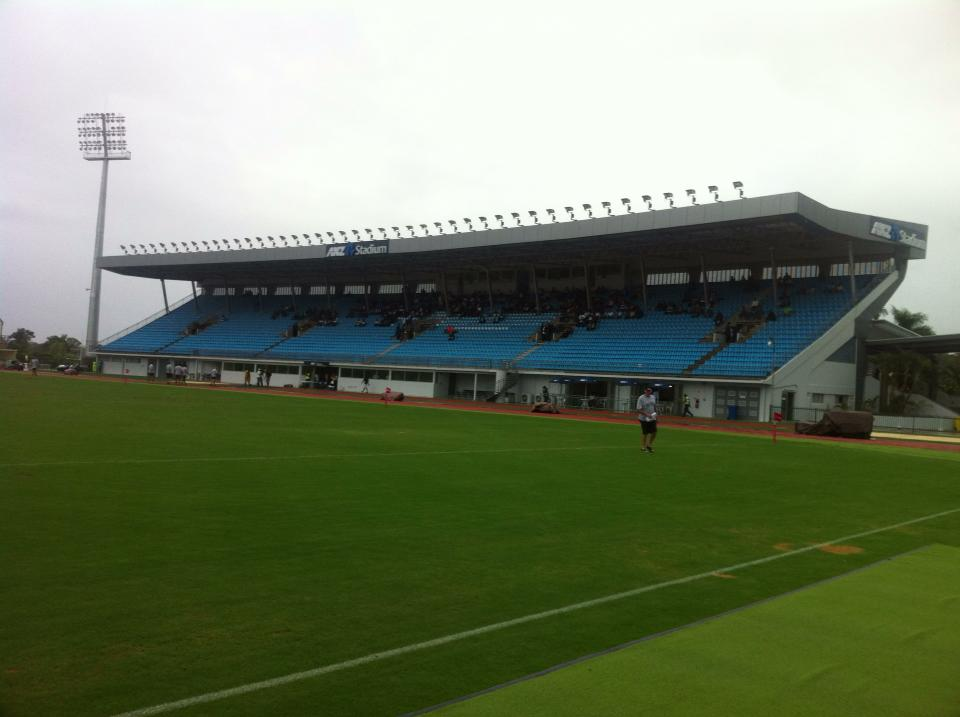
National Stadium (also known as ANZ Stadium) in Suva, Fiji, hosted the final.

Assistant referees:
Tevita Makasini (Tonga)
Paul Ahupu (Tahiti)
Fourth official:
Robinson Banga (Vanuatu)
