= 2017 OFC Champions League =

Tournament details
- Host countries: Qualifying stage: Tonga; Group stage: New Caledonia; New Zealand
- Dates: Qualifying stage: 28 January – 3 February 2017; Competition proper: 25 February – 7 May 2017
- Teams: Competition proper: 16; Total: 18 (from 11 associations)

Final positions
- Champions: (New Zealand) Auckland City (9th title)
- Runners-up: (New Zealand) Team Wellington

Tournament statistics
- Matches played: 36
- Goals scored: 161 (4.47 per match)
- Attendance: 26,100 (725 per match)
- Top scorer(s): (New Zealand) Ryan De Vries (England) Tom Jackson (Portugal) João Moreira (6 goals each)
- Best player: (Spain) Ángel Berlanga
- Best goalkeeper: (Spain) Eñaut Zubikarai
- Fair play award: (New Zealand) Auckland City

The 2017 OFC Champions League was the 16th edition of the Oceanian Club Championship, Oceania's premier club football tournament organized by the Oceania Football Confederation (OFC), and the 11th season under the current OFC Champions League name.

In the final, Auckland City defeated Team Wellington 5–0 on aggregate and won the OFC Champions League seven consecutive seasons and nine times in total, and qualified as the OFC representative at the 2017 FIFA Club World Cup in the United Arab Emirates.

== Format change ==
The OFC decided to expand the tournament and change the format for the 2017 edition:

- The competition consisted of four stages: qualifying stage, group stage, semi-finals, and final.
- For the qualifying stage, like in the previous season, four teams took part in this stage, which included one team each from the four developing associations. The stage was played in round-robin format at a single venue, with the winners and runners-up advancing to the group stage (instead of only the group winners).
- For the group stage, 16 teams took part in this stage (increased from 12 teams), which included two teams each from the seven developed associations, plus the qualifying stage winners and runners-up. They were drawn into four groups of four teams (increased from three groups), where each group was played in round-robin format at a different venue (instead of all groups played at a single venue), with the group winners advancing to the semi-finals.
- For the semi-finals, the four teams were drawn into two ties, which were played in home-and-away format over two legs (instead of a single match).
- For the final, the tie was played in home-and-away format over two legs (instead of a single match).

== Teams ==
Location of teams of the 2017 OFC Champions League.
Teams entering the group stage; (H) Group stage host
Teams entering the qualifying stage; (h) Qualifying stage host

A total of 18 teams from all 11 OFC member associations entered the competition.

- The seven developed associations (Fiji, New Caledonia, New Zealand, Papua New Guinea, Solomon Islands, Tahiti, Vanuatu) were awarded two berths each in the group stage.
- The four developing associations (American Samoa, Cook Islands, Samoa, Tonga) were awarded one berth each in the qualifying stage, with the winners and runners-up advancing to the group stage.

Association	Team	Qualifying method
Teams entering the group stage
Fiji	Ba	2016 Fiji National Football League champions
Fiji	Rewa	2016 Fiji National Football League runners-up
(New Caledonia) New Caledonia	Magenta	2015 New Caledonia Super Ligue champions
(New Caledonia) New Caledonia	Hienghène Sport	2015 New Caledonia Super Ligue runners-up
(New Zealand) New Zealand	Team Wellington	2015–16 New Zealand Football Championship grand final champions
(New Zealand) New Zealand	Auckland City	2015–16 New Zealand Football Championship regular season premiers
(Papua New Guinea) Papua New Guinea	Lae City Dwellers	2015–16 Papua New Guinea National Champions League runners-up
(Papua New Guinea) Papua New Guinea	Madang	2015–16 Papua New Guinea National Soccer League fifth place
(Solomon Islands) Solomon Islands	Marist	2016 Solomon Islands S-League champions
(Solomon Islands) Solomon Islands	Western United	2016 Solomon Islands S-League runners-up
(French Polynesia) Tahiti	Tefana	2015–16 Tahiti Ligue 1 champions
(French Polynesia) Tahiti	Central Sport	2015–16 Tahiti Ligue 1 runners-up
Vanuatu	Malampa Revivors	2015 VFF National Super League runners-up
Vanuatu	Erakor Golden Star	2016 Port Vila Top Four Super League winners
Teams entering the qualifying stage
(American Samoa) American Samoa	Utulei Youth	2015 FFAS Senior League champions
(Cook Islands) Cook Islands	Puaikura	2016 Cook Islands Round Cup champions
Samoa	Lupe o le Soaga	2014–15 Samoa National League champions
Tonga	Veitongo	2015 Tonga Major League champions

Notes

1. Papua New Guinea (PNG): On 2 February 2017, the OFC announced that Hekari United, the 2015–16 Papua New Guinea National Champions League winners, had been disqualified after the Papua New Guinea Football Association filed a formal complaint due to the team's dispute with the football association. On 8 February 2017, the OFC announced that they would be replaced by Madang, the 2015–16 Papua New Guinea National Soccer League Northern Zone third place, which was the next best team in the league to accept participation.

== Schedule ==
The schedule of the competition was as follows.

Stage	Draw date	Match dates	Matchday	Matches
Qualifying stage	24 August 2016 (Auckland, New Zealand)	28 January – 3 February 2017	Matchday 1	Team 4 vs. Team 1, Team 2 vs. Team 3
Qualifying stage	24 August 2016 (Auckland, New Zealand)	28 January – 3 February 2017	Matchday 2	Team 1 vs. Team 3, Team 4 vs. Team 2
Qualifying stage	24 August 2016 (Auckland, New Zealand)	28 January – 3 February 2017	Matchday 3	Team 1 vs. Team 2, Team 3 vs. Team 4
Group stage	24 August 2016 (Auckland, New Zealand)	Group A: 25 February – 3 March 2017; Group B: 26 February – 4 March 2017; Group C: 11–18 March 2017; Group D: 11–17 March 2017	Matchday 1	Team 4 vs. Team 1, Team 2 vs. Team 3
Group stage	24 August 2016 (Auckland, New Zealand)	Group A: 25 February – 3 March 2017; Group B: 26 February – 4 March 2017; Group C: 11–18 March 2017; Group D: 11–17 March 2017	Matchday 2	Team 1 vs. Team 3, Team 4 vs. Team 2
Group stage	24 August 2016 (Auckland, New Zealand)	Group A: 25 February – 3 March 2017; Group B: 26 February – 4 March 2017; Group C: 11–18 March 2017; Group D: 11–17 March 2017	Matchday 3	Team 1 vs. Team 2, Team 3 vs. Team 4
Semi-finals	20 March 2017 (Auckland, New Zealand)	8–16 April 2017	First leg	Semi-finalist 1 vs. Semi-finalist 2, Semi-finalist 3 vs. Semi-finalist 4
Semi-finals	20 March 2017 (Auckland, New Zealand)	8–16 April 2017	Second leg	Semi-finalist 2 vs. Semi-finalist 1, Semi-finalist 4 vs. Semi-finalist 3
Final	20 March 2017 (Auckland, New Zealand)	30 April – 7 May 2017	First leg	Finalist 1 vs. Finalist 2
Final	20 March 2017 (Auckland, New Zealand)	30 April – 7 May 2017	Second leg	Finalist 2 vs. Finalist 1

== Draw ==
The draw of the qualifying stage and group stage was held on 24 August 2016, 12:30 NZST (UTC+12), at the OFC Headquarters in Auckland, New Zealand.

For the qualifying stage, the four teams were drawn into each of the four positions 1–4 to determine the fixtures.

Qualifying stage draw
Pot 1
- (Samoa) Lupe o le Soaga
- (Cook Islands) Puaikura (Note: The identity of the teams from Cook Islands, Fiji, Solomon Islands, and Vanuatu were not known at the time of the draw.)
- (American Samoa) Utulei Youth
- (Tonga) Veitongo

For the group stage, the 16 teams (14 teams entering the group stage and two teams advancing from the qualifying stage) were drawn into four groups of four, with each group containing one team from each of the four pots 1–4, which also represented the positions in each group to determine the fixtures. Teams from the same association could not be drawn into the same group. The teams were seeded based on the following:

- The teams seeded 1–11 were based on the team results of the 2016 OFC Champions League.
- The teams seeded 12–14 were based on the association results of the 2016 OFC Champions League.
- The teams seeded 15–16 were the qualifying stage winners and runners-up respectively, whose identity were not known at the time of the draw.

Group stage draw
Pot 1	Pot 2	Pot 3	Pot 4
1. (New Zealand) Auckland City; 2. (New Zealand) Team Wellington; 3. (New Caledonia) Magenta; 4. (French Polynesia) Tefana	5. (Vanuatu) Malampa Revivors; 6. (Papua New Guinea) Madang (Note: Hekari United were included as part of the draw, but were disqualified and replaced by Madang after the draw.); 7. (Fiji) Ba; 8. (Solomon Islands) Marist	9. (Fiji) Rewa; 10. (Papua New Guinea) Lae City Dwellers; 11. (New Caledonia) Hienghène Sport; 12. (French Polynesia) Central Sport	13. (Vanuatu) Erakor Golden Star; 14. (Solomon Islands) Western United; 15. Qualifying stage winners 16. Qualifying stage runners-up

== Qualifying stage ==
In the qualifying stage, the four teams played each other on a round-robin basis. The winners and runners-up advanced to the group stage to join the 14 direct entrants.

Matches were played between 28 January – 3 February 2017 in Nukuʻalofa, Tonga. All times were local, TOT (UTC+13).

Pos	Team	Pld	W	D	L	GF	GA	GD	Pts	Qualification	PUA	LUP	VEI	UTU
1	(Cook Islands) Puaikura	3	3	0	0	9	2	+7	9	Group stage	—	2–1	—	3–1
2	(Samoa) Lupe o le Soaga	3	1	1	1	6	6	0	4	Group stage	—	—	1–1	—
3	(Tonga) Veitongo (H)	3	1	1	1	4	6	−2	4		0–4	—	—	3–1
4	(American Samoa) Utulei Youth	3	0	0	3	5	10	−5	0		—	3–4	—	—

Source: OFC
(H) Hosts
28 January 2017
12:00

Utulei Youth (American Samoa)	3–4	(Samoa) Lupe o le Soaga
Bourne 12' (pen.); Kerewi 40', 68' (pen.)	Report	Ataga 19' (pen.); Toni 35', 51' (pen.); Malo 41'

Loto-Tonga Soka Centre, Nukuʻalofa
Attendance: 100
Referee: Joel Hopkken (Vanuatu)
28 January 2017
15:00

Veitongo (Tonga)	0–4	(Cook Islands) Puaikura
	Report	Bonsu-Maro 19'; Rhodes 25', 90'; Feao 56' (o.g.)

Loto-Tonga Soka Centre, Nukuʻalofa
Attendance: 350
Referee: Médéric Lacour (New Caledonia)

31 January 2017
12:00

Puaikura (Cook Islands)	2–1	(Samoa) Lupe o le Soaga
Carpenter 29'; Bonsu-Maro 31'	Report	Ataga 75'

Loto-Tonga Soka Centre, Nukuʻalofa
Attendance: 100
Referee: George Time (Solomon Islands)
31 January 2017
15:00

Veitongo (Tonga)	3–1	(American Samoa) Utulei Youth
Uele 13'; H. Falepapalangi 50'; Moala 90'	Report	Bourne 30'

Loto-Tonga Soka Centre, Nukuʻalofa
Attendance: 300
Referee: David Yareboinen (Papua New Guinea)

3 February 2017
12:00

Puaikura (Cook Islands)	3–1	(American Samoa) Utulei Youth
Edwards 45+1', 55'; Bonsu-Maro 90'	Report	Faatonu 82'

Loto-Tonga Soka Centre, Nukuʻalofa
Attendance: 100
Referee: David Yareboinen (Papua New Guinea)
3 February 2017
15:00

Lupe o le Soaga (Samoa)	1–1	(Tonga) Veitongo
Ataga 66'	Report	Moala 87'

Loto-Tonga Soka Centre, Nukuʻalofa
Attendance: 350
Referee: Médéric Lacour (New Caledonia)

== Group stage ==
In the group stage, the four teams in each group played each other on a round-robin basis. The four group winners advanced to the semi-finals.

The hosts of each group were announced on 10 October 2016. The schedule was confirmed on 17 January 2017.

=== Group A ===
Matches were played between 25 February – 3 March 2017 in Nouméa, New Caledonia. All times were local, NCT (UTC+11).

Pos	Team	Pld	W	D	L	GF	GA	GD	Pts	Qualification	MAG	CEN	MAD	LUP
1	(New Caledonia) Magenta (H)	3	3	0	0	11	3	+8	9	Semi-finals	—	4–2	5–0	—
2	(French Polynesia) Central Sport	3	2	0	1	12	7	+5	6		—	—	—	3–0
3	(Papua New Guinea) Madang	3	1	0	2	7	15	−8	3		—	3–7	—	—
4	(Samoa) Lupe o le Soaga	3	0	0	3	4	9	−5	0		1–2	—	3–4	—

Source: OFC
(H) Hosts
25 February 2017
17:00

Madang (Papua New Guinea)	3–7	(French Polynesia) Central Sport
V. Malagian 2' (pen.); Pohei 78'; Sengum 84' (pen.)	Report	Castillo 38', 58'; Cifuentes 45+1'; Sandoval 56'; Tissot 64'; Tangis 81'; Estay 90+5'

Stade Numa Daly, Nouméa
Attendance: 1,000
Referee: Campbell-Kirk Waugh (New Zealand)
25 February 2017
20:05

Lupe o le Soaga (Samoa)	1–2	(New Caledonia) Magenta
Khouchaba 26'	Report	Marin 4'; Hnautra 45+2'

Stade Numa Daly, Nouméa
Attendance: 1,750
Referee: Roger Adams (Papua New Guinea)

28 February 2017
17:00

Lupe o le Soaga (Samoa)	3–4	(Papua New Guinea) Madang
Khouchaba 3', 56' (pen.); Toni 66'	Report	Aisa 5'; Gubag 13'; Tole 81'; Kini 84'

Stade Numa Daly, Nouméa
Attendance: 200
Referee: Hamilton Siau (Solomon Islands)
28 February 2017
20:05

Magenta (New Caledonia)	4–2	(French Polynesia) Central Sport
Marin 10', 80'; Henessewene 56'; Aucher 76'	Report	Paama 28', 41' (pen.)

Stade Numa Daly, Nouméa
Attendance: 1,000
Referee: Joel Hopkken (Vanuatu)

3 March 2017
17:00

Central Sport (French Polynesia)	3–0	(Samoa) Lupe o le Soaga
Castillo 28', 34'; Estay 48'	Report

Stade Numa Daly, Nouméa
Attendance: 500
Referee: Roger Adams (Papua New Guinea)
3 March 2017
20:05

Magenta (New Caledonia)	5–0	(Papua New Guinea) Madang
Marin 26' (pen.); Welepane 61', 68'; Nemia 73'; Athale 85'	Report

Stade Numa Daly, Nouméa
Attendance: 2,000
Referee: Campbell-Kirk Waugh (New Zealand)

=== Group B ===
Matches were played between 26 February – 4 March 2017 in Koné, New Caledonia. All times were local, NCT (UTC+11).

Pos	Team	Pld	W	D	L	GF	GA	GD	Pts	Qualification	WEL	HIE	BAF	PUA
1	(New Zealand) Team Wellington	3	3	0	0	15	2	+13	9	Semi-finals	—	3–1	8–0	—
2	(New Caledonia) Hienghène Sport (H)	3	1	1	1	5	5	0	4		—	—	—	3–1
3	(Fiji) Ba	3	1	1	1	2	9	−7	4		—	1–1	—	—
4	(Cook Islands) Puaikura	3	0	0	3	2	8	−6	0		1–4	—	0–1	—

Source: OFC
(H) Hosts
26 February 2017
17:00

Puaikura (Cook Islands)	1–4	(New Zealand) Team Wellington
Estay 18' (pen.)	Report	Samuela 38' (o.g.); Hailemariam 45+1', 68'; Margetts 62'

Stade Yoshida, Koné
Attendance: 400
Referee: George Time (Solomon Islands)
26 February 2017
20:00

Ba (Fiji)	1–1	(New Caledonia) Hienghène Sport
Tiwa 90'	Report	Kaï 70' (pen.)

Stade Yoshida, Koné
Attendance: 850
Referee: Abdelkader Zitouni (Tahiti)

1 March 2017
17:00

Puaikura (Cook Islands)	0–1	(Fiji) Ba
	Report	Waqa 82'

Stade Yoshida, Koné
Attendance: 200
Referee: David Yareboinen (Papua New Guinea)
1 March 2017
20:00

Team Wellington (New Zealand)	3–1	(New Caledonia) Hienghène Sport
Jackson 12'; Moretti 84'; Bevin 90+3'	Report	Kaï 33'

Stade Yoshida, Koné
Attendance: 1,200
Referee: Norbert Hauata (Tahiti)

4 March 2017
17:00

Team Wellington (New Zealand)	8–0	(Fiji) Ba
Jackson 19' (pen.), 56', 59'; Harris 32', 51'; Barcia 45+8'; Zambrano 82'; Villa 90+2'	Report

Stade Yoshida, Koné
Attendance: 200
Referee: Norbert Hauata (Tahiti)
4 March 2017
20:00

Hienghène Sport (New Caledonia)	3–1	(Cook Islands) Puaikura
Kaï 8', 40'; Bamy 71'	Report	Estay 29'

Stade Yoshida, Koné
Attendance: 700
Referee: Arnold Tari (Vanuatu)

=== Group C ===
Matches were played between 11–18 March 2017 in Auckland, New Zealand. All times were local, NZDT (UTC+13).

Pos	Team	Pld	W	D	L	GF	GA	GD	Pts	Qualification	AUC	WES	LAE	MAL
1	(New Zealand) Auckland City (H)	3	3	0	0	15	1	+14	9	Semi-finals	—	—	2–0	11–0
2	(Solomon Islands) Western United	3	2	0	1	8	6	+2	6		1–2	—	—	2–1
3	(Papua New Guinea) Lae City Dwellers	3	1	0	2	8	9	−1	3		—	3–5	—	—
4	(Vanuatu) Malampa Revivors	3	0	0	3	3	18	−15	0		—	—	2–5	—

Source: OFC
(H) Hosts
11 March 2017
13:00

Malampa Revivors (Vanuatu)	2–5	(Papua New Guinea) Lae City Dwellers
Warisan 45' (o.g.); Bai 62'	Report	R. Gunemba 8'; Dabinyaba 37'; Debenham 54'; Bika 56'; Kamen 67'

Mangere Centre Park, Auckland
Attendance: 200
Referee: Salesh Chand (Fiji)
11 March 2017
16:00

Western United (Solomon Islands)	1–2	(New Zealand) Auckland City
Naka 37'	Report	White 75'; Tade 86' (pen.)

Mangere Centre Park, Auckland
Attendance: 600
Referee: Norbert Hauata (Tahiti)

15 March 2017
13:00

Western United (Solomon Islands)	2–1	(Vanuatu) Malampa Revivors
Nawo 25'; H. Fa'arodo 75' (pen.)	Report	Alick 53' (pen.)

Mangere Centre Park, Auckland
Attendance: 100
Referee: Rakesh Chandra (Fiji)
15 March 2017
16:00

Auckland City (New Zealand)	2–0	(Papua New Guinea) Lae City Dwellers
Lewis 44', 61'	Report

Mangere Centre Park, Auckland
Attendance: 250
Referee: Abdelkader Zitouni (Tahiti)

18 March 2017
13:00

Lae City Dwellers (Papua New Guinea)	3–5	(Solomon Islands) Western United
R. Gunemba 44'; Kepe 60'; Debenham 90+2'	Report	H. Fa'arodo 16' (pen.); Wale 21'; Waroi 37'; Totori 65'; A. Fa'arodo 87' (pen.)

Mangere Centre Park, Auckland
Attendance: 100
Referee: Norbert Hauata (Tahiti)
18 March 2017
16:00

Auckland City (New Zealand)	11–0	(Vanuatu) Malampa Revivors
De Vries 7', 45', 66', 75'; Lea'alafa 31', 33'; Edge 36'; Moreira 41', 53', 58'; Drake 52'	Report

Mangere Centre Park, Auckland
Attendance: 300
Referee: Abdelkader Zitouni (Tahiti)

=== Group D ===
Matches were played between 11–17 March 2017 in Pirae, Tahiti. All times were local, TAHT (UTC−10). <onyinclude>

Pos	Team	Pld	W	D	L	GF	GA	GD	Pts	Qualification	TEF	MAR	ERA	REW
1	(French Polynesia) Tefana (H)	3	2	1	0	8	4	+4	7	Semi-finals	—	2–2	—	2–0
2	(Solomon Islands) Marist	3	1	1	1	7	6	+1	4		—	—	—	4–2
3	(Vanuatu) Erakor Golden Star	3	1	0	2	5	7	−2	3		2–4	2–1	—	—
4	(Fiji) Rewa	3	1	0	2	4	7	−3	3		—	—	2–1	—

Source: OFC
(H) Hosts
11 March 2017
18:00

Marist (Solomon Islands)	4–2	(Fiji) Rewa
André Morosini 3'; Guilherme Guedes 68' (pen.), 90+2'; Bakale 71'	Report	Marcelo 44'; Makoe 89'

Stade Pater, Pirae
Attendance: 250
Referee: Joel Hopkken (Vanuatu)
11 March 2017
21:00

Erakor Golden Star (Vanuatu)	2–4	(French Polynesia) Tefana
T. Kaltack 19', 90+5'	Report	Tinorua 29' (pen.); Graglia 57'; Tiaiho 77'; Atani 90'

Stade Pater, Pirae
Attendance: 1,500
Referee: Matthew Conger (New Zealand)

14 March 2017
18:00

Erakor Golden Star (Vanuatu)	2–1	(Solomon Islands) Marist
T. Kaltack 38', 85'	Report	Guilherme Guedes 30'

Stade Pater, Pirae
Attendance: 500
Referee: Peter Linney (New Zealand)
14 March 2017
21:00

Tefana (French Polynesia)	2–0	(Fiji) Rewa
Atani 45'; Tiaiho 76' (pen.)	Report

Stade Pater, Pirae
Attendance: 1,000
Referee: Campbell-Kirk Waugh (New Zealand)

17 March 2017
18:00

Rewa (Fiji)	2–1	(Vanuatu) Erakor Golden Star
Marcelo 24'; Goundar 31'	Report	T. Kaltack 58'

Stade Pater, Pirae
Attendance: 250
Referee: Campbell-Kirk Waugh (New Zealand)
17 March 2017
21:00

Tefana (French Polynesia)	2–2	(Solomon Islands) Marist
J. Tehau 23'; Boso 39' (o.g.)	Report	Guilherme Guedes 44', 90' (pen.)

Stade Pater, Pirae
Attendance: 1,500
Referee: Matthew Conger (New Zealand)

== Knockout stage ==
In the knockout stage, the four teams played on a single-elimination basis, with each tie played on a home-and-away two-legged basis. If tied on aggregate, away goals were the first tie-breaker.

The draw for the knockout stage was held on 20 March 2017, 11:30 NZDT (UTC+13), at the OFC Headquarters in Auckland, New Zealand, to decide the matchups and the order of legs of the semi-finals, and the order of legs of the final.

=== Bracket ===
Semi-finals
1	(French Polynesia) Tefana	0	0	0
4	(New Zealand) Auckland City	2	2	4
3	(New Caledonia) Magenta	2	1	3
2	(New Zealand) Team Wellington	2	7	9

Final
(New Zealand) Auckland City	3	2	5
(New Zealand) Team Wellington	0	0	0

=== Semi-finals ===
Matches were played on 8 and 16 April 2017.

Team 1	Agg.	Team 2	1st leg	2nd leg
Tefana (French Polynesia)	0–4	(New Zealand) Auckland City	0–2	0–2
Magenta (New Caledonia)	3–9	(New Zealand) Team Wellington	2–2	1–7

8 April 2017
18:00 UTC−10

Tefana (French Polynesia)	0–2	(New Zealand) Auckland City
	Report	Howieson 48'; Lewis 79'

Stade Pater, Pirae
Attendance: 1,500
Referee: George Time (Solomon Islands)
16 April 2017
14:00 UTC+12

Auckland City (New Zealand)	2–0	(French Polynesia) Tefana
Tade 33'; Moreira 64'	Report

Kiwitea Street, Auckland
Attendance: 800
Referee: Joel Hopkken (Vanuatu)

Auckland City won 4–0 on aggregate.

8 April 2017
20:05 UTC+11

Magenta (New Caledonia)	2–2	(New Zealand) Team Wellington
Nemia 6'; Marin 90+2' (pen.)	Report	Jackson 61' (pen.); Bevin 81'

Stade Numa Daly, Nouméa
Attendance: 3,000
Referee: Abdelkader Zitouni (Tahiti)
16 April 2017
14:00 UTC+12

Team Wellington (New Zealand)	7–1	(New Caledonia) Magenta
Stevens 7', 72'; Robertson 44'; Jackson 49'; Bevin 63'; Zambrano 70'; Margetts 90+3'	Report	Cexome 33'

David Farrington Park, Wellington
Attendance: 950
Referee: Norbert Hauata (Tahiti)

Team Wellington won 9–3 on aggregate.

=== Final ===
Matches were played on the 30 April and 7 May 2017.

30 April 2017
14:00 UTC+12

Auckland City (New Zealand)	3–0	(New Zealand) Team Wellington
Moreira 20' (pen.), 28'; De Vries 89'	Report

Kiwitea Street, Auckland
Attendance: 1,000
Referee: Nick Waldron (New Zealand)
7 May 2017
13:00 UTC+12

Team Wellington (New Zealand)	0–2	(New Zealand) Auckland City
	Report	De Vries 63'; Tade 76'

David Farrington Park, Wellington
Attendance: 1,000
Referee: Norbert Hauata (Tahiti)

Auckland City won 5–0 on aggregate.

== Top goalscorers ==
— Team eliminated / inactive for this stage.

Rank	Player	Team	Qualifying stage	Group stage	Semi-finals	Final	Total
1	(New Zealand) Ryan De Vries	(New Zealand) Auckland City	—	4	0	2	6
1	(England) Tom Jackson	(New Zealand) Team Wellington	—	4	2	0	6
1	(Portugal) João Moreira	(New Zealand) Auckland City	—	3	1	2	6
4	(Brazil) Guilherme Guedes	(Solomon Islands) Marist	—	5	—	—	5
4	(Vanuatu) Tony Kaltack	(Vanuatu) Erakor Golden Star	—	5	—	—	5
4	(France) Nicolas Marin	(New Caledonia) Magenta	—	4	1	—	5
7	(Chile) César Castillo	(French Polynesia) Central Sport	—	4	—	—	4
7	(New Caledonia) Bertrand Kaï	(New Caledonia) Hienghène Sport	—	4	—	—	4
9	(Samoa) Suivai Ataga	(Samoa) Lupe o le Soaga	3	0	—	—	3
9	(New Zealand) Andy Bevin	(New Zealand) Team Wellington	—	1	2	0	3
9	(Cook Islands) Maro Bonsu-Maro	(Cook Islands) Puaikura	3	0	—	—	3
9	(New Zealand) Cherbel Khouchaba	(Samoa) Lupe o le Soaga	0	3	—	—	3
9	(New Zealand) Clayton Lewis	(New Zealand) Auckland City	—	2	1	0	3
9	(Argentina) Emiliano Tade	(New Zealand) Auckland City	—	1	1	1	3
9	(Samoa) Lapalapa Toni	(Samoa) Lupe o le Soaga	2	1	—	—	3

== Awards ==
The following awards were given at the conclusion of the tournament.

Award	Player	Team
Golden Ball	(Spain) Ángel Berlanga	(New Zealand) Auckland City
Golden Boot	(Portugal) João Moreira	(New Zealand) Auckland City
Golden Glove	(Spain) Eñaut Zubikarai	(New Zealand) Auckland City
Fair Play Award	—	(New Zealand) Auckland City

== See also ==
- 2017 FIFA Club World Cup
