= 2015 New Caledonia Super Ligue =

New Caledonia Super Ligue
- Season: 2015
- Champions: Magenta

The New Caledonia Super Ligue 2015 season was the 42nd season of the FCF since its establishment in 1962. The champions were chosen to represent the New Caledonia Super Ligue in the 2017 OFC Champions League.

== Standings ==
Pos	Team	Pld	W	D	L	GF	GA	GD	Pts	Qualification or relegation
1	Magenta (C)	22	15	3	4	52	29	+23	70	2017 OFC Champions League group stage
2	Hienghène Sport	22	14	6	2	60	22	+38	70	2017 OFC Champions League group stage
3	Gaïtcha FCN	22	12	7	3	57	21	+36	65	
4	Ne Drehu	22	11	4	7	50	37	+13	59	
5	Wacaelé	22	11	3	8	42	40	+2	58	
6	Mont-Dore	22	11	3	8	56	44	+12	58	
7	Lössi	22	8	8	6	48	36	+12	54	
8	Wetr	22	7	6	9	49	52	−3	49	
9	Tiga Sport	22	6	4	12	39	46	−7	44	
10	FC Bélep	22	4	6	12	35	62	−27	39 (Note: 1 point deducted.)	
11	Baco (R)	22	4	2	16	35	85	−50	35 (Note: 1 point deducted.)	Relegation to the 2016 Promotion d'Honneur
12	Auteuil (R)	22	1	4	17	22	71	−49	26 (Note: 3 points deducted.)	Relegation to the 2016 Promotion d'Honneur

Source: Soccerway
Rules for classification: 1) Points, 2) Head to head, 3) Goal difference. 4 points for a win, 2 points for a draw, and 1 for a defeat.
(C) Champions; (R) Relegated
