= Guilherme (footballer, born July 1991) =

Brazilian footballer

Personal information
- Full name: Guilherme Soares Guedes de Freitas
- Date of birth: 24 July 1991 (age 35)
- Place of birth: Santana do Livramento, Brazil
- Height: 1.85 m (6 ft 1 in)
- Position: Forward

Team information
- Current team: Tonan Maebashi
- Number: 32

Youth career
- 2006–2009: Internacional
- 2007: → Sport Club Ulbra (loan)
- 2010: Caxias
- 2011: Atlético Mineiro

Senior career*
Years	Team	Apps	(Gls)
2012–2013	Montevideo Wanderers	15	(3)
2013–2014	Għargħur	18	(15)
2014–2015	Mqabba	20	(14)
2015	Al-Shabab	0	(0)
2016	Guarani-SC	0	(0)
2016	Concórdia	0	(0)
2017	Marist	6	(4)
2018-2019	Tonan Maebashi		
2019	Sagamihara	6	(0)
2020–	Tonan Maebashi	9	(6)
- * Club domestic league appearances and goals as of 19:57, 24 January 2021 (UTC)

Guilherme Soares Guedes de Freitas (born 24 July 1991), commonly known as Guilherme, is a Brazilian footballer who plays for Tonan Maebashi.

== Club career ==
Guilherme joined Solomon Islands side Marist Fire in 2017, playing in three OFC Champions League games, scoring five goals. He started the season well, with four goals in his first six games. However, he was detained by police along with compatriots Marcelo and Diego in late 2017, as their visas had failed to process. He left Marist and returned to his native Brazil.

== Career statistics ==
=== Club ===
As of 13 June 2018.

Club	Season	League			Cup		Continental		Other		Total	
Club	Season	Division	Apps	Goals	Apps	Goals	Apps	Goals	Apps	Goals	Apps	Goals
Montevideo Wanderers	2012–13	Primera División Uruguaya	15	3	0	0	–		0	0	15	3
Għargħur	2013–14	Maltese Second Division	18	15	0	0	–		0	0	18	15
Mqabba	2014–15	Maltese First Division	20	14	0	0	–		0	0	20	14
Guarani-SC	2016	–			0	0	–		8 (Note: Appearances in Campeonato Catarinense)	3	8	3
Concórdia	2016	–			0	0	–		4 (Note: Appearances in Campeonato Catarinense II)	0	4	0
Marist	2017–18	Telekom S-League	6	4	0	0	3 (Note: Appearances in the OFC Champions League)	5	0	0	9	9
Career total			59	36	0	0	3	5	12	3	74	44
