= 2015 FFAS Senior League =

FFAS Senior League
- Season: 2015
- Champions: Utulei Youth
- Matches: 24
- Goals: 112 (4.67 per match)

The 2015 season of the FFAS Senior League Division 1 was the thirty-fifth season of association football competition in American Samoa.

== Format ==
Six teams competed in the league. The top team became the champion.

== Table ==
Pos	Team	Pld	W	D	L	GF	GA	GD	Pts	Qualification
1	Utulei Youth (C, Q)	8	6	2	0	29	8	+21	20	2016 OFC Champions League preliminary stage
2	Lion Heart	8	5	2	1	28	14	+14	17	
3	Ilaoa and To'omata	8	5	1	2	27	14	+13	16	
4	FC SKBC	8	3	2	3	13	14	−1	11	
5	PanSa	8	1	1	6	9	33	−24	4	Team disqualified for forfeiting matches twice
6	Vaiala Tongan	8	0	0	8	6	29	−23	0	Team disqualified for forfeiting matches

Updated to match(es) played on unknown. Source:
Rules for classification: 1) points; 2) goal difference; 3) number of goals scored.
(C) Champions; (Q) Qualified for the phase indicated
