= Kohei Matsumoto =

Japanese footballer

Kohei Matsumoto 松本 孝平
Personal information
- Date of birth: 31 July 1994 (age 32)
- Place of birth: Kanagawa, Japan
- Height: 1.86 m (6 ft 1 in)
- Position: Forward

Team information
- Current team: FC Osaka
- Number: 88

Youth career
- 2001–2006: Ishikawa SSS
- 2007–2009: Takinosawa Junior High School
- 2010–2012: Fujisawa Seiryu High School

College career
Years	Team	Apps	(Gls)
2013–2016	Kokushikan University		

Senior career*
Years	Team	Apps	(Gls)
2017–2018	Nagoya Grampus	0	(0)
2018	→ SC Sagamihara (loan)	13	(0)
2019–2020	Maruyasu Okazaki	23	(2)
2021	Tiamo Hirakata	30	(12)
2022	Kamatamare Sanuki	32	(9)
2023-2024	Ventforet Kofu	14	(0)
2024	Kataller Toyama (Loan)	26	(1)
2025-	FC Osaka	5	(0)
2025	→ Kamatamare Sanuki (loan)	8	(0)
- * Club domestic league appearances and goals as of 1 January 2026

Kohei Matsumoto (松本 孝平, Matsumoto Kōhei; born 31 July 1994), is a Japanese professional footballer who plays as a forward for FC Osaka.

== Career ==
Matsumoto joined Nagoya Grampus and then he was loaned to SC Sagamihara in Summer 2018. On 10 January 2019, Matsumoto joined FC Maruyasu Okazaki.

== Career statistics ==
Updated to 3 September 2018.

Appearances and goals by club, season and competition
Club	Season	League			Emperor's Cup		J.League Cup		Total	
Club	Season	Division	Apps	Goals	Apps	Goals	Apps	Goals	Apps	Goals
Nagoya Grampus	2017	J2 League	0	0	0	0	—		0	0
Nagoya Grampus	2018	J1 League	0	0	0	0	0	0	0	0
SC Sagamihara	2018	J3 League	4	0	—		—		4	0
Career total			4	0	0	0	0	0	4	0
