= Emiliano Tade =

Argentine footballer (born 1988)

Personal information
- Full name: Emiliano Tade
- Date of birth: 3 March 1988 (age 38)
- Place of birth: Santiago del Estero, Argentina
- Height: 1.76 m (5 ft 9 in)
- Position: Forward

Team information
- Current team: Auckland FC (OFC) (assistant coach)

Youth career
- Club Atlético Mitre

Senior career*
Years	Team	Apps	(Gls)
–2009	Club Atlético Mitre	0	(0)
2010	Wellington United		
2010–2011	Team Wellington	16	(6)
2011–2018	Auckland City	97	(73)
2012–2017	Central United		(62)
2015	→ Club Atlético Mitre (loan)	14	(3)
2018–2019	AmaZulu	17	(5)
2019	Mamelodi Sundowns	8	(1)
2020–2023	Auckland City	49	(27)
2024	Western Springs	22	(15)
2025	Auckland United	19	(14)
2026	Auckland FC (OFC)	16	(5)
Total		258	(211)

Managerial career
- 2026–: Auckland FC (OFC) (assistant)
- * Club domestic league appearances and goals

Emiliano Tade (born March 3, 1988) is a former Argentine professional footballer who played a forward.

Tade holds the record for number of consecutive participations in the FIFA Club World Cup, appearing for Auckland City at seven consecutive FIFA Club World Cup tournaments from 2011 to 2017. He is currently the all-time leading goal scorer for Auckland City, as well as the all-time leading goal scorer in New Zealand Football Championship history; his exploits earned him a professional move to South Africa, eventually signing for league champions Mamelodi Sundowns in 2019.

== Career ==
=== Early career ===
Born in Santiago del Estero, Tade grew up playing for boyhood side Club Atlético Mitre. Instead of pursuing a career in football, Tade was studying to become a lawyer before moving to New Zealand in April 2010. After Martín Pereyra, a fellow Argentine playing in New Zealand, suggested he trial for local semi-pro side Wellington United, Tade began a club football career.

Tade's performances in the Central Premier League impressed Team Wellington head coach Stu Jacobs, and Tade signed for the ASB Premiership club prior to the 2010–11 season, scoring six goals in 16 appearances in his debut season in the New Zealand top flight.

=== Auckland City ===
The next season, Tade sealed a move to Auckland City, joining a Hispanic contingent that included Andreu Guerao, Manel Expósito, Albert Riera, Ángel Berlanga and Luis Corrales.

Tade won the golden boot in both the 2013–14 ASB Premiership and 2013–14 OFC Champions League. He also won his first league championship that season, scoring the only goal in the final as Auckland City beat former club Team Wellington on 16 March 2014.

Due to Auckland City's dominance in the OFC Champions League, winning the competition for seven straight seasons, Tade appeared at a record seven consecutive FIFA Club World Cup competitions between 2011 and 2017. This included Auckland City's historic run in the 2014 FIFA Club World Cup, falling to Argentine giants San Lorenzo in the semifinal, before defeating Cruz Azul in the third-place playoff. His performances in the tournament earned him a move to Torneo Federal A side Club Atlético Mitre ahead of the 2015 season; however, he lasted less than a season before returning to Auckland.

=== South Africa ===
==== AmaZulu ====
On 26 May 2018, Tade confirmed that he had completed a move to Absa Premiership club AmaZulu FC following a successful trial. Tade made his debut for Usuthu in a 1−0 win over Baroka FC on 4 August 2018. He quickly began to impress during his time in South Africa, forming a strong partnership with Bongi Ntuli and becoming widely regarded as one of the most dangerous forwards in the league. After a productive first half of the season where Tade scored seven goals in all competitions and won Player of the Month honours for November and December, he drew interest from the league's larger clubs.

==== Mamelodi Sundowns ====
On 31 January 2019, reigning champions Mamelodi Sundowns announced the signing of Emiliano Tade for an undisclosed fee - believed to be around 6 million rand - which also included the permanent transfer of Bongi Ntuli, previously on loan to AmaZulu, in the other direction. Mamelodi went on to win the title that season, with Tade contributing two goals in 12 appearances for Sundowns.

His next season in South Africa was plagued by injury and personal issues; Tade failed to make an appearance for Sundowns, and eventually requested a release from his contract, citing constant injury struggles, homesickness and a wish to cease playing professionally. Tade agreed a mutual termination of contract, and he was officially released on 11 December 2019, returning to his family in New Zealand.

=== Return to Auckland City ===
On 13 January 2020, Auckland City confirmed that Tade had returned to the club alongside Tom Doyle.

=== Auckland United ===
On 6 March 2025, Auckland United announced the signing of Tade for the 2025 season.

=== Auckland FC ===
On 11 December 2025, Tade joined Auckland FC (OFC) as one of the first five signings for the OFC Pro League. He was also named one of the assistant coaches. He scored his first goal for Auckland FC, a penalty, on 20 January 2026 in a 3–1 victory over Vanuatu United at Eden Park. He went on to make 16 appearances and score five goals during the season, helping Auckland FC win the inaugural 2026 OFC Professional League title. Tade came off the bench to secure the championship in a 2–1 victory over South Melbourne in the 2026 final.

On 4 June 2026, Tade announced his retirement from football at the age of 38. He stayed on as part of Auckland FC's coaching staff.

== Career statistics ==
=== Club ===
As of 27 September 2025

Appearances and goals by club, season and competition
Club	Season	League			National Cup		Continental		Other		Total	
Club	Season	Division	Apps	Goals	Apps	Goals	Apps	Goals	Apps	Goals	Apps	Goals
Team Wellington	2010–11	Premiership	16	6	—		—		—		16	6
Auckland City	2011–12	Premiership	10	8	—		3 (Note: Appearances in OFC Champions League)	2	2 (Note: One appearance in FIFA Club World Cup; one appearance in Charity Cup)	0	15	10
Auckland City	2012–13	Premiership	16	6	—		3	1	2 (Note: One appearance in FIFA Club World Cup; one appearance in Charity Cup)	0	21	7
Auckland City	2013–14	Premiership	14	17	—		7	6	5 (Note: Four appearances in FIFA Club World Cup; one appearance, one goal in Charity Cup)	1	26	24
Auckland City	2014–15	Premiership	7	4	—		2 (Note: Appearances in OFC President's Cup)	4	2 (Note: One appearance in FIFA Club World Cup; one appearance, one goal in Charity Cup)	1	10	9
Auckland City	2015–16	Premiership	15	7	—		4	0	2 (Note: One ppearance in FIFA Club World Cup; one appearance in Charity Cup)	0	21	7
Auckland City	2016–17	Premiership	17	13	—		6	3	1 (Note: Appearances in FIFA Club World Cup)	0	24	16
Auckland City	2017–18	Premiership	18	18	—		6	8	1	0	25	26
Auckland City	Total		97	73	0	0	31	24	15	2	142	99
Mitre (loan)	2015	Torneo Federal A	14	3	0	0	—		0	0	14	3
AmaZulu	2018–19	SA Premier Division	17	5	1	1	—		2 (Note: Appearances in Carling Knockout Cup)	1	20	7
Mamelodi Sundowns	2018–19	SA Premier Division	8	1	0	0	4 (Note: Appearances in CAF Champions League)	1	0	0	12	2
Auckland City	2019–20	Premiership	6	4	—		3	2	0	0	9	6
Auckland City	2020–21	Premiership	4	2	—		0	0	0	0	4	2
Auckland City	2021	National League	7	8	0	0	—		—		7	8
Auckland City	2022	National League	25	17	6	3	5	2	1	0	37	22
Auckland City	2023	National League	14	4	0	0	2	3	1	0	17	7
Auckland City	Total		56	35	6	3	10	7	2	0	74	45
Western Springs	2024	National League	22	15	3	4	—		—		25	19
Auckland United	2025	National League	19	14	4	6	—		—		23	20
Auckland FC	2026	—			—		16 (Note: Appearances in OFC Professional League)	5	—		16	5
Career total			249	152	14	14	61	27	19	3	342	206

== Honours ==
Auckland City

- NZ Football League: 2013–14, 2014–15, 2017–18, 2019–20^{(Note: Due to the COVID-19 pandemic, the 2019–20 season was concluded after 16 rounds. The remaining two rounds of the regular season and the finals series were cancelled. Auckland City, who were leading the regular season table, were declared champions and also awarded the Minor Premiership.)}, 2022
- Premiers of NZFC: 2011–12, 2013–14, 2014–15, 2015–16, 2016–17, 2017–18, 2019–20, 2020–21
- Northern League: 2021, 2022, 2023
- Chatham Cup: 2022
- Charity Cup: 2011, 2013, 2015, 2016
- OFC Champions League: 2012, 2013, 2014, 2016, 2017, 2022, 2023
- OFC President's Cup: 2014
- FIFA Club World Cup 3rd Place: 2014

Central United

- Chatham Cup: 2012

Auckland FC

- OFC Professional League: 2026

Individual

- Jack Batty Memorial Cup: 2012
- New Zealand Football Championship golden boot: 2013–14, 2017–18
- Northern League top scorer: 2025
