= Ángel Berlanga =

Spanish footballer (born 1987)

Personal information
- Full name: Ángel Luis Viña Berlanga
- Date of birth: 24 February 1987 (age 39)
- Place of birth: Madrid, Spain
- Height: 1.82 m (6 ft 0 in)
- Position: Centre-back

Youth career
- 2005–2008: Rayo Majadahonda

Senior career*
Years	Team	Apps	(Gls)
2008–2010	Rayo Majadahonda	67	(1)
2010–2013	Auckland City	32	(3)
2013	Sporting Goa	10	(1)
2013–2020	Auckland City	104	(2)
2022–2023	Auckland City	9	(1)

Managerial career
- 2021: West Coast Rangers (assistant)
- * Club domestic league appearances and goals as of 4 July 2022

Ángel Luis Viña Berlanga (born 24 February 1987) is a Spanish professional footballer who plays as a centre-back.

== Career ==
=== Auckland City ===
After playing in his native Spain for Rayo Majadahonda, Berlanga signed for Auckland City in 2010, joining newly appointed manager and compatriot Ramon Tribulietx. He made his debut for the club on 15 October 2010 against Waikato at Fred Jones Park, in which Berlanga played the full 90 minutes as he helped his side to a 3–2 victory. He then scored his first goal for Auckland City in the OFC Champions League on 3 December 2010 against AS Tefana, when he scored in the 90th minute to help Auckland draw the match 1–1. He scored his first league goal for his club on 10 December 2010 against YoungHeart Manawatu, in which he scored in the 23rd minute to help Auckland to a 3–1 victory.

Then, after helping Auckland City win the 2010–11 OFC Champions League, Berlanga made his debut in the FIFA Club World Cup in the 2011 FIFA Club World Cup against Kashiwa Reysol of the Japanese J. League on 8 December 2011, in which he played the full 90 minutes but could not stop Auckland City getting knocked-out after losing 2–0. Berlanga then scored his second league goal for Auckland City on 10 March 2012 against Otago United, in which he scored in the 48th minute to make the score 3–0 to Auckland before Otago got a goal back to end the game by a score of 3–1. Berlanga then scored what would be his final goal for his club in the league on 7 April 2012 against Canterbury United, in which he scored the equalizer for Auckland City in the 42nd minute to tie the match at 1–1, and that is the score that remained after the game was finished. Berlanga also finished his final full OFC Champions League season on 12 May 2012 against Tefana, in which Berlanga played the full 90 minutes in both legs of the final to give Auckland City an aggregate victory of 3–1 and automatic qualification into the 2012 FIFA Club World Cup.

=== Sporting Goa ===
In January 2013 it was announced that Berlanga would sign with Sporting Clube de Goa of the I-League in India and on 28 January 2013 he made his debut for the club in which he started, played the full 90 minutes, and scored his first goal for the club in the process in the 67th minute to help Sporting Goa beat Salgaocar by a score of 2–0.

=== Return to Auckland City ===
After the 2012–13 I-League season concluded, Berlanga re-signed for Auckland City FC right before the 2013 FIFA Club World Cup. He made his return debut for the club in the Club World Cup on 11 December 2013 against Raja Casablanca. He started the match as Auckland City lost the match 2–1. He then started for Auckland City in their league opener against Team Wellington as the club won 3–2.

Berlanga starred in Auckland City's historic 2014 FIFA Club World Cup campaign, in which the club finished third, netting the equaliser against Copa Libertadores champions San Lorenzo in the semifinal from a seemingly impossible angle; Auckland City eventually fell 2-1 in extra time. Berlanga was absent for Auckland City's third-place playoff win over Cruz Azul due to suspension.

Berlanga then started for Auckland City in their championship winning match against Team Wellington on 15 March 2014. Auckland City won 1–0 as they won the ASB Premiership. In the following years, Berlanga transitioned from a full-back to an important centre-back for the club, being appointed captain following the retirement of club legend Ivan Vicelich.

On 16 January 2023, Berlanga retired.

== Career statistics ==
=== Club ===
Statistics accurate as of 21 March 2014

Club	Season	League			National Cup		Continental		Other		Total	
Club	Season	Division	Apps	Goals	Apps	Goals	Apps	Goals	Apps	Goals	Apps	Goals
Auckland City	2010–11	Premiership	14	1	—		7 (Note: Appearances in OFC Champions League)	1 (Note: Appearances in FIFA Club World Cup)	0	0	21	2
Auckland City	2011–12	Premiership	13	2	—		7	0	1	0	21	2
Auckland City	2012–13	Premiership	5	0	—		0	0	1	0	6	0
Auckland City	Total		32	3	0	0	14	1	2	0	48	4
Sporting Goa	2012–13	I-League	10	1	0	0	0	0	0	0	10	1
Auckland City	2013–14	Premiership	11	0	—		1	0	1	0	13	0
Auckland City	2014–15	Premiership	14	0	—		8 (Note: OFC Champions League; three appearances and one goal in OFC President's Cup)	1	3	1	25	2
Auckland City	2015–16	Premiership	10	0	—		5	0	1	0	16	0
Auckland City	2016–17	Premiership	13	0	—		7	0	1	0	21	0
Auckland City	2017–18	Premiership	16	0	—		6	0	1	0	23	0
Auckland City	2018–19	Premiership	16	0	—		5	0	0	0	21	0
Auckland City	2019–20	Premiership	11	1	—		2	0	0	0	13	1
Auckland City	2020–21	Premiership	0	0	—		0	0	0	0	0	0
Auckland City	2021	National League	0	0	0	0	—		—		0	0
Auckland City	2022	National League	12	1	0	0	1	0	0	0	13	1
Auckland City	Total		103	2	0	0	35	1	7	1	145	4
Career total			145	6	0	0	49	2	9	1	203	9

== Honours ==
Auckland City

- NZ Football League: 2013–14, 2014–15, 2017–18, 2019–20^{(Note: Due to the COVID-19 pandemic, the 2019–20 season was concluded after 16 rounds. The remaining two rounds of the regular season and the finals series were cancelled. Auckland City, who were leading the regular season table, were declared champions and also awarded the Minor Premiership.)}
- Charity Cup: 2011, 2013, 2015
- Premiers of NZFC: 2011–12, 2013–14, 2014–15, 2015–16, 2016–17, 2017–18, 2018–19, 2019–20
- OFC Champions League: 2010–11, 2011–12, 2014–15, 2016, 2017, 2022
- OFC President's Cup: 2014
