= OFC President's Cup =

- Organiser(s): OFC
- Founded: 2014
- Region: Oceania (and invitation sides from Asia and North America)
- Teams: 6
- Current champions: (New Zealand) Auckland City (1st title)
- Most championships: (New Zealand) Auckland City (1 title)
- 2014 OFC President's Cup

The OFC President's Cup was an association football competition organised by the Oceania Football Confederation (OFC) between clubs and national teams. A decision to create this competition was confirmed at the OFC's Executive committee in March 2014. The inaugural competition was held in Auckland, New Zealand between 17 and 23 November 2014.

== Format ==
A total of six teams participated in the tournament: the reigning OFC Champions League winners and runners-up, two teams from the Asian Football Confederation and two further invitational sides.

The competition was played in two groups of three teams with the top team in each group advancing to the final, and the remaining teams advancing to the third and fifth place matches.

== Results ==
Year	Host	Final			Third Place Match		
Year	Host	Champion	Score	Second Place	Third Place	Score	Fourth Place
2014; Details	(New Zealand); Auckland	(New Zealand) Auckland City	2–1	(Vanuatu) Amicale	(Bahrain) Busaiteen	3–0	Singapore U-23
