= Harry Edge =

New Zealand footballer

Personal information
- Full name: Harrison Andrew Moss-Edge
- Date of birth: 1 March 1994 (age 32)
- Place of birth: Tauranga, New Zealand
- Height: 1.91 m (6 ft 3 in)
- Positions: Defender; midfielder

Team information
- Current team: Torslanda IK
- Number: 4

Youth career
- 2014-2015: PEC Zwolle

Senior career*
Years	Team	Apps	(Gls)
2011-2012	WaiBOP United	11	(1)
2014	Hawke's Bay United	7	(0)
2015	Tuks	1	(0)
2016-2018	Auckland City	20	(0)
2018-2019	Eastern Suburbs	18	(0)
2019-	Torslanda IK	162	(5)
- * Club domestic league appearances and goals as of 24 November 2025

Harrison Moss-Edge (born 1 March 1994) is a New Zealand footballer who plays as a defender or midfielder for Torslanda IK.

== Career ==
=== Club career ===
In 2014, Edge joined the youth academy of Dutch side PEC Zwolle. In 2015, he signed for Tuks in South Africa, where he made one league appearance and scored 0 goals. On 13 September 2015, Edge debuted for Tuks during a 0–1 loss to [[Bidvest Wits F.C>|Bidvest Wits]]. In 2017, he trialed for English Premier League club West Brom. Before the 2019 season, Edge signed for Torslanda IK in the Swedish fourth division, where he suffered relegation to the Swedish third division.

=== International career ===
Edge is eligible to represent Malaysia internationally through his father.
