= Ramon Tribulietx =

Spanish football manager (born 1972)

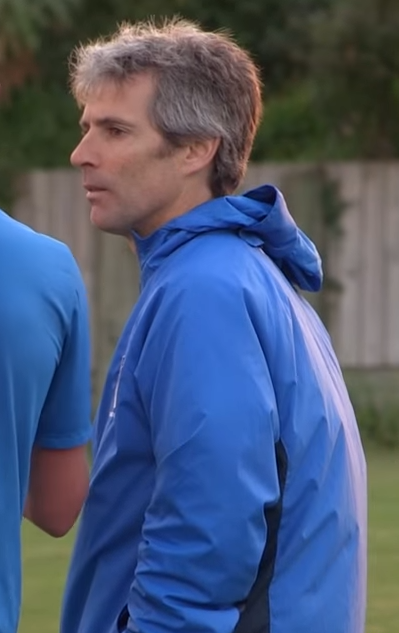
- Tribulietx in 2015

Personal information
- Full name: Ramon Tribulietx Santolaya
- Date of birth: 20 September 1972 (age 54)
- Place of birth: Barcelona, Spain

Senior career*
Years	Team	Apps	(Gls)
–1999	Sant Andreu		
1999	Central United		
2014	Warkworth AFC		

Managerial career
- 2005–2006: Sant Andreu (assistant)
- 2006–2007: Figueres (assistant)
- 2007–2008: Castelldefels (assistant)
- 2008–2010: Auckland City (assistant)
- 2010–2019: Auckland City
- 2021–2022: Akron Tolyatti
- 2022–2024: Budapest Honvéd (assistant)
- 2024: United City
- * Club domestic league appearances and goals

Ramon Tribulietx Santolaya (born 20 September 1972) is a Spanish football coach and former player.

Tribulietx holds the world record for the most trophies in continental competitions, winning seven straight OFC Champions League titles with Auckland City between 2011 and 2017.

== Playing career ==
Born in Barcelona, Tribulietx enjoyed a low-profile playing career in New Zealand, signing for would-be North Island Soccer League champions Central United in 1999. However, he stayed for only two months before breaking his arm in a reserve fixture and returning to Spain.

He came briefly out of retirement while manager of Auckland City in 2014, playing several games for Northern League Division Two side Warkworth AFC in 2014 under current Wellington Phoenix goalkeeping coach Paul Gothard.

== Coaching career ==
Having gained a degree in physical education at the Institut Nacional d'Educació Física de Catalunya in 1998, Tribulietx's first foray into management came as the assistant coach of newly promoted Segunda División B side UE Sant Andreu. The next season, Tribulietx moved to UE Figueres at the same level and, after the club's dissolution, moved to UE Castelldefels.

Tribulietx became the assistant manager at Auckland City under Paul Posa in 2008. In 2010, he was named as co-manager of Auckland City along with Aaron McFarland; Tribulietx took full control of the club following the 2010–11 season, topping the league in six out of his eight seasons and winning the playoff series three times.

Tribulietx won seven consecutive OFC Champions League titles between 2011 and 2017, the highest consecutive streak of any manager for any continental or international competition. As a result, Auckland City has qualified for seven consecutive FIFA Club World Cup competitions. Tribulietx guided the Navy Blues to a historic third-placed finish in the 2014 FIFA Club World Cup, falling to Copa Libertadores champions San Lorenzo in extra time in the semi-final before defeating Cruz Azul in a penalty shootout in the third-placed playoff.

In addition to his management duties at Auckland City, Tribulietx has also enjoyed external coaching roles, acting as technical advisor for the Canada women's national football team at the 2012 Summer Olympics (winning an eventual bronze medal), and for the Solomon Islands national football team during the 2016 OFC Nations Cup.

On 10 December 2021, he was hired by FC Akron Tolyatti in the Russian second-tier Russian Football National League. He left Akron on 2 March 2022 due to the Russian invasion of Ukraine.

On 1 May 2024, He was appointed as United City's new head coach following the resignation of Romanian former footballer and current manager Marian Mihail.

== Managerial statistics ==
As of match played 1 June 2025

Managerial record by team and tenure
Team	From	To	Record								Ref.
Team	From	To	G	W	D	L	GF	GA	GD	Win %	Ref.
Auckland City	1 July 2010	30 June 2019	246	176	33	37	627	222	+405	71.54	
Akron Tolyatti	10 December 2021	2 March 2022	0	0	0	0	0	0	+0	—	
United City	1 May 2024	present	11	7	3	1	44	9	+35	63.64	
Total			257	183	36	38	671	231	+440	71.21	—

== Honours ==
=== Manager ===
Auckland City

- FIFA Club World Cup third place: 2014
- OFC Champions League: 2010–11, 2011–12, 2012–13, 2013–14, 2014–15, 2016, 2017
- New Zealand Football Championship Premiers: 2011-12, 2013-14, 2014-15, 2015–16, 2016–17, 2017–18
- New Zealand Football Championship: 2014, 2015, 2018
- Charity Cup: 2011, 2013, 2015, 2016, 2018
- OFC President's Cup: 2014
- Lunar New Year Cup: 2017

=== Technical consultant ===
Canada Women's Olympic Team

- 2012 London Olympics third place: 2012
