= Luis Corrales =

Costa Rican association football player

Luis Alberto Fonseca Corrales (born 20 September 1983) is a Costa Rican former footballer who is last known to have played as a striker for Stop Out.

== Playing career ==
In 2006, Corrales moved to New Zealand. In 2009, while playing in New Zealand, he received interest from Australian sides. He has won the OFC Champions League. Altogether, he has won one New Zealand league title and finished second four times.

He has also played in the FIFA Club World Cup. Besides that, he has been top scorer of the New Zealand top flight.

== Post-playing career ==
After retirement, Corrales worked as a football coach.

== Personal life ==
Corrales married a New Zealander. He has a son.
