= Leonardo Villa =

Argentine footballer

Personal information
- Full name: Leonardo Raul Villa
- Date of birth: 3 March 1985 (age 41)
- Place of birth: Santa Fe, Argentina
- Position: Forward

Senior career*
Years	Team	Apps	(Gls)
2004–2005	Venezia	5	
2005–2006	Triestina	1	
2006–2007	AS Cittadella	2	
2007–2008	Vibonese	20	
2008–2009	Rovigo	29	(3)
2009–2010	Ischia Isolaverde		
- * Club domestic league appearances and goals

Leonardo Raul Villa (born 3 March 1985), commonly known as Leo Villa, is an Argentinian footballer. He made his Serie B debut with FBC Unione Venezia in the 2004–2005 season.
