= Micah Lea'alafa =

Solomon Islands footballer

Personal information
- Full name: Micah Lea'alafa
- Date of birth: 1 June 1991 (age 35)
- Place of birth: Yandina, Central Province, Solomon Islands
- Height: 1.69 m (5 ft 7 in)
- Positions: Attacking midfielder; striker

Team information
- Current team: FK Beograd
- Number: 24

Senior career*
Years	Team	Apps	(Gls)
2010–2014	Solomon Warriors		(3)
2014–2015	Amicale		
2015	Solomon Warriors		
2015–2019	Auckland City	45	(18)
2019–2020	Maritzburg United	11	(0)
2020–2022	Solomon Warriors		
2022	Wynnum District	3	(7)
2022	Waneagu United		
2023	FK Beograd	20	(6)
2024	Northern Demons	21	(8)
2025	Vipers FC	21	(7)
2026–	Pontian Eagles	12	(2)

International career^{‡}
2012	Solomon Islands U-23	3	(3)
2012–	Solomon Islands Futsal	9	(6)
2016–	Solomon Islands	31	(9)
Medal record
Representing Solomon Islands
Pacific Games
Silver medal – second place	2023 Solomon Islands
- * Club domestic league appearances and goals as of 4 August 2026 ‡ National team caps and goals as of 17 November 2024

Micah Lea'alafa (born 1 June 1991) is a Solomon Islands professional footballer who plays as a midfielder for FK Beograd and captains the Solomon Islands national team.

== Career ==
After failing to qualify for the 2014-15 OFC Champions League with Solomon Warriors, Lea'alafa moved abroad to Vanuatu to play for OFC Champions League runners-up Amicale.

Following an unsuccessful trial at an unnamed club in Italy, Lea'alafa moved to Oceanian champions Auckland City in 2015. In July 2019 he joined the South African club Maritzburg United. He was released by the club in February 2020.

Internationally, Lea'alafa made his debut for the Solomon Islands national team on March 24, 2016 in their 2–0 victory against Papua New Guinea. He also plays for the Solomon Islands national futsal team.

It was reported on February 25, 2023 that the player made his debut for FK Beograd.

== International goals ==
Scores and results list the Solomon Islands' goal tally first.

#	Date	Venue	Opponent	Score	Result	Competition
1.	27 March 2016	Lawson Tama Stadium, Honiara, Solomon Islands	Papua New Guinea	1–0	1–2	Friendly
2.	25 May 2017	ANZ National Stadium, Suva, Fiji	Fiji	1–1	1–1	Friendly
3.	9 June 2017	Lawson Tama Stadium, Honiara, Solomon Islands	Papua New Guinea	3–2	3–2	2018 FIFA World Cup qualification
4.	5 September 2017	Lawson Tama Stadium, Honiara, Solomon Islands	New Zealand	1–2	2–2	2018 FIFA World Cup qualification
5.	5 September 2018	Stadium Australia, Sydney, Australia	Fiji	1–0	1–1	Friendly
6.	18 March 2019	Lawson Tama Stadium, Honiara, Solomon Islands	Vanuatu	2–1	3–1	Friendly
7.	24 September 2022	Luganville Soccer Stadium, Luganville, Vanuatu	Fiji	2–0	2–2	2022 MSG Prime Minister's Cup
8.	28 November 2023	Lawson Tama Stadium, Honiara, Solomon Islands	Fiji	2–0	2–0	2023 Pacific Games
9.	17 November 2024	PNG Football Stadium, Port Moresby, Papua New Guinea	Papua New Guinea	2–0	2–1	2026 FIFA World Cup qualification

== Honours ==
=== Player ===
Auckland City

- OFC Champions League: 2015–16, 2016-17

Solomon Islands

- Pacific Games: Silver Medalist, 2023

=== Individual ===
- 2015–16 OFC Champions League Golden Ball
