= Mario Bilen =

Croatian footballer

Personal information
- Full name: Mario Bilen
- Date of birth: 23 January 1985 (age 41)
- Place of birth: Vinkovci, Croatia
- Height: 1.90 m (6 ft 3 in)
- Positions: Defender; midfielder

Team information
- Current team: Ngaruawahia
- Number: 16

Youth career
- Cibalia Vinkovci

Senior career*
Years	Team	Apps	(Gls)
2003–2007	Cibalia	39	(0)
2004	→ Dilj (loan)	6	(0)
2007	Hrvatski Dragovoljac	0	(0)
2008	Orašje	10	(0)
2008–2009	Slaven Belupo	23	(1)
2010	Flamurtari	7	(0)
2010	Vukovar '91	2	(0)
2011	Nehaj	15	(0)
2012	Zadar	21	(0)
2013–2021	Auckland City	94	(2)
2022–	Ngaruawahia	2	(0)

International career
2001	Croatia U15	5	(0)
2001–2002	Croatia U17	4	(0)
2003	Croatia U18	5	(0)
2003–2004	Croatia U19	13	(1)
2004	Croatia U20	1	(0)
- * Club domestic league appearances and goals as of 09:20, 14 June 2021 (UTC)

Mario Bilen (born 23 January 1985 in Vinkovci, Croatia) is a Croatian professional footballer who currently plays for NRFL Division 2 club Ngaruawahia United.

== Club career ==
A stalwart in Croatia's top-flight, the 1.HNL. and youth national teams, where he befriended Luka Modric, Bilen immigrated to New Zealand in 2013 to sign for 9x OFC Oceania Champions League winners, Auckland City FC. After leading the defensive line for the club in over 100 top-flight matches in New Zealand, Bilen departed the club in December 2022, aged 36.

He is widely regarded as a club legend at City and played an instrumental role in the club's third-place finish at the FIFA Club World Cup in 2014 as the starting centre-back.

Following his departure from Auckland City, he joined Ngaruawahia United on the eve of their promotion playoff into NRFL Division 2 against Papakura City. He made his debut for Ngaruawahia in the first game of the NRFL Division 2 season in a 2–0 away win over West Auckland.
