= Kim Dae-wook =

South Korean footballer (born 1987)

Personal information
- Full name: Kim Dae-wook
- Date of birth: 23 November 1987 (age 38)
- Height: 1.80 m (5 ft 11 in)
- Position: Midfielder

Senior career*
Years	Team	Apps	(Gls)
2010	Daejeon Citizen FC	2	(0)
2013	Gyeongju HNP	8	(0)
2014–2018	Auckland City	20	(2)
2018	FC Anyang	1	(0)
2019–2023	East Coast Bays		

International career
- South Korea futsal

Managerial career
- 2023–2024: East Coast Bays (assistant)
- 2025–: Auckland City U23 Head Coach
- * Club domestic league appearances and goals as of 30 December 2018

Kim Dae-wook (Korean: 김대욱; Hanja: 金大旭; born 23 November 1987) is a South Korean football manager and former player who played as a defender. He is currently the assistant coach for Auckland City in the Northern League. Besides South Korea, he played in New Zealand.

Kim scored Auckland City's only goal in a 1–2 defeat to Kashima Antlers in the 2016 FIFA Club World Cup. He has also scored two goals for the club in the OFC Champions League and helped the club win their sixth consecutive Champions League title in 2016.

Kim signed on for East Coast Bays for the 2023 season making it his fifth season with the club over two stints.

Kim has an AFC coaching A License and runs an academy in Auckland called K Elite. He also works as a Development Coach at East Coast Bays and is also an assistant for the reserves team.

Kim was also part of the South Korea national futsal team.

In January 2025, East Coast Bays announced Kim had returned to Auckland City to take up a coaching opportunity with them.
