= João Moreira (footballer, born 1986) =

Portuguese footballer

Personal information
- Full name: João Vítor Rocha de Carvalho Moreira
- Date of birth: 7 February 1986 (age 40)
- Place of birth: Amadora, Portugal
- Height: 1.84 m (6 ft 0 in)
- Position: Forward

Youth career
- 1997–2001: Olivais Moscavide
- 2001–2004: Estrela Amadora

Senior career*
Years	Team	Apps	(Gls)
2004–2005	Estrela Amadora	9	(3)
2005–2008	Valencia B	26	(2)
2005–2006	→ Rayo Vallecano (loan)	1	(0)
2007	→ Nacional (loan)	8	(0)
2008	→ Leixões (loan)	6	(0)
2008–2009	Beira-Mar	13	(0)
2009–2010	Estrela Amadora	21	(3)
2010–2011	Lleida	22	(4)
2011–2012	Linense	9	(0)
2012	Almansa	9	(3)
2012–2013	DPMM	16	(7)
2014–2017	Auckland City	39	(19)
2018	Hibernians	7	(2)
2018–2019	Golden Arrows	7	(1)
2020–2021	Team Wellington	12	(5)
2022	Miramar Rangers	4	(3)
2023	Manukau United	15	(4)
2024	Takapuna	9	(2)

International career
2004–2005	Portugal U20	13	(4)
2006–2008	Portugal U21	20	(3)
- * Club domestic league appearances and goals as of 21:16, 19 June 2024 (UTC)

João Vítor Rocha de Carvalho Moreira (born 7 February 1986) is a Portuguese professional footballer who plays as a forward.

== Club career ==
Moreira was born in Amadora, Lisbon. Still a youngster, he made his Primeira Liga debut with C.F. Estrela da Amadora and, after that season, signed a five-year contract with Valencia CF, but was immediately loaned out to Rayo Vallecano.

Moreira played one season with the latter club's B side, being relegated from Segunda División B. Still under loan, he then spent the 2007–08 campaign with C.D. Nacional and Leixões SC, being released in June 2008 by the Spaniards without any official appearances and dropping down to his country's Segunda Liga by joining S.C. Beira-Mar.

On 26 June 2009, Moreira underwent a trial at Heart of Midlothian alongside compatriot Zezinando. An eventual deal fell through, and he returned to Estrela after four years.

Moreira left for Spain again in June 2010, agreeing to a one-year contract with UE Lleida in division three. He stayed in that country and tier for 2011–12 and joined Real Balompédica Linense, but was released by the latter in January 2012.

On 18 December 2012, Moreira signed for the only professional football team in Brunei, DPMM FC, joining alongside Stéphane Auvray as one of the foreign players for the 2013 season of the S.League. On 6 February 2014 he switched to the New Zealand Football Championship with Auckland City FC, making his first league appearance ten days later when he started and scored once in the 10–0 away demolition of Southern United FC.

Moreira netted six times in as many games during the 2017 edition of the OFC Champions League – including twice in a 2–0 final first leg defeat of Team Wellington FC – helping the club to the seventh consecutive accolade in the competition (fourth during his tenure). On 14 October of that year, the 31-year-old left Kiwitea Street.
