= New Zealand men's national under-23 football team results (1992–2019) =

This page details the match results and statistics of the New Zealand men's national under-23 football team from 1992 until 2019.

== Key ==
Key to matches

- Att. = Match attendance
- (H) = Home ground
- (A) = Away ground
- (N) = Neutral ground

Key to record by opponent

- Pld = Games played
- W = Games won
- D = Games drawn
- L = Games lost
- GF = Goals for
- GA = Goals against

== A-International results ==
New Zealand's score is shown first in each case.

New Zealand national football team results
No.	Date	Venue	Opponents	Score	Competition	New Zealand scorers	Att.	Ref.
1	22 May 1991	Melbourne (A)	Australia	0–2	1991 OFC Men's Olympic Qualifying Tournament		—	
2	16 July 1991	Noumea (A)	New Caledonia	1–1	Friendly	Edge	—	
3	17 July 1991	Noumea (A)	New Caledonia	4–0	Friendly	Harlock (2), Falloon, Fitzpatrick	—	
4	19 July 1991	Noumea (A)	New Caledonia	1–1	Friendly	Jason Falloon	—	
5	7 November 1991	Nadi (A)	Fiji	4–0	1991 OFC Men's Olympic Qualifying Tournament	Falloon (2), Bowden, Edge	—	
6	13 November 1991	Nadi (N)	Australia	1–2	1991 OFC Men's Olympic Qualifying Tournament	Coveny	—	
7	15 November 1991	Nadi (N)	Papua New Guinea	3–0	1991 OFC Men's Olympic Qualifying Tournament	Coveny (2), Harlock	—	
8	18 November 1991	Nadi (N)	Papua New Guinea	4–2	1991 OFC Men's Olympic Qualifying Tournament	Edge, Harlock, McAllister, own goal	—	
9	20 November 1991	Nadi (N)	Fiji	0–0	1991 OFC Men's Olympic Qualifying Tournament		—	
10	15 January 1996	Adelaide (N)	Fiji	1–2	1996 OFC Men's Olympic Qualifying Tournament	Hay	—	
11	17 January 1996	Adelaide (N)	Vanuatu	10–0	1996 OFC Men's Olympic Qualifying Tournament	Elliott (3), Hay (3), Bunce, Fallon, Seales, Vicelich	—	
12	19 January 1996	Adelaide (N)	Solomon Islands	2–0	1996 OFC Men's Olympic Qualifying Tournament	Elliott, Vicelich	—	
12	21 January 1996	Hindmarsh Stadium, Adelaide (A)	Australia	0–5	1996 OFC Men's Olympic Qualifying Tournament		—	
13	23 January 1996	Adelaide (N)	Fiji	3–1	1996 OFC Men's Olympic Qualifying Tournament	Burton, Elliott, Foy	—	
14	27 January 1996	Adelaide (N)	Vanuatu	5–1	1996 OFC Men's Olympic Qualifying Tournament	Fallon (2), Foy (2), Wilkinson	—	
15	29 January 1996	Adelaide (N)	Solomon Islands	6–0	1996 OFC Men's Olympic Qualifying Tournament	Elliott (2), Foy (2), Burton, Fallon	—	
16	31 January 1996	Adelaide (A)	Australia	1–0	1996 OFC Men's Olympic Qualifying Tournament	Elliott	—	
17	13 June 1998	Malanda Dairy Farmers Stadium, Townsville (A)	Australia	0–1	Friendly		—	
18	17 June 1998	Oakes Oval, Lismore (A)	Australia	0–2	Friendly		4,000	
19	20 June 1998	International Sports Stadium, Coffs Harbour (A)	Australia	0–4	Friendly		4,400	
20	30 June 1999	North Harbour Stadium, Auckland (H)	Australia	0–2	Friendly		5,000	
21	3 July 1999	Queen Elizabeth II Park, Christchurch (H)	Australia	0–3	Friendly		1,000	
22	12 December 1999	Auckland (H)	Vanuatu	4–0	1999 OFC Men's Olympic Qualifying Tournament	Bouckenooghe, Hickey, J. Murray, Urlovic	—	
23	16 December 1999	Auckland (H)	Papua New Guinea	5–0	1999 OFC Men's Olympic Qualifying Tournament	C. Banks (2), Campbell, Nelsen, Rowe	—	
24	18 December 1999	Auckland (H)	Fiji	5–2	1999 OFC Men's Olympic Qualifying Tournament	Bouckenooghe (2), Hickey, Nelsen, M. Urlovic	—	
25	20 December 1999	Auckland (H)	Solomon Islands	4–1	1999 OFC Men's Olympic Qualifying Tournament	Urlovic (3), Scoullar	—	
26	21 January 2000	North Harbor Stadium, Auckland (H)	South Korea	1–2	Friendly	Scott	12,000	
27	23 January 2000	Central Energy Trust Arena, Palmerston North (H)	South Korea	2–5	Friendly	Campbell, Hickey	3,000	
28	29 March 2000	Yoyogi National Stadium, Tokyo (A)	Japan	0–4	Friendly		36,467	
29	19 May 2000	North Harbor Stadium, Auckland (H)	South Africa	2–3	2000 Summer Olympics qualification	Urlovic, F. McCarthy (o.g.)	13,500	
30	27 May 2000	Vosloorus Stadium, Johannesburg (A)	South Africa	0–1	2000 Summer Olympics qualification		20,000	
31	21 May 2003	Wing Stadium, Kobe (A)	Japan	0–4	Friendly		16,380	
32	14 January 2004	North Harbor Stadium, Auckland (H)	Cook Islands	9–0	2004 OFC Men's Olympic Qualifying Tournament	Fisher (3), Jones, Pritchett (2), Pearce (2), Smith	260	
33	16 January 2004	North Harbor Stadium, Auckland (H)	American Samoa	11–0	2004 OFC Men's Olympic Qualifying Tournament	Pearce (3), Smeltz (5), Mulligan, Smith, Puna	250	
34	18 January 2004	North Harbor Stadium, Auckland (H)	Tonga	2–0	2004 OFC Men's Olympic Qualifying Tournament	Bertos, Turner	250	
35	22 January 2004	North Harbor Stadium, Auckland (H)	Vanuatu	3–2	2004 OFC Men's Olympic Qualifying Tournament	Lochhead, Smeltz, Fisher	1,000	
36	26 January 2004	Parramatta Stadium, Sydney (A)	Australia	0–2	2004 OFC Men's Olympic Qualifying Tournament		7,120	
37	30 January 2004	North Harbor Stadium, Auckland (H)	Australia	1–1	2004 OFC Men's Olympic Qualifying Tournament	Smeltz	3,000	
38	1 March 2008	Churchill Park, Lautoka (A)	Fiji	2–1	2008 OFC Men's Olympic Qualifying Tournament	Peverley, Old	—	
39	3 March 2008	Churchill Park, Lautoka (N)	Vanuatu	2–0	2008 OFC Men's Olympic Qualifying Tournament	Barbarouses, Brockie	—	
40	5 March 2008	Churchill Park, Lautoka (N)	Papua New Guinea	5–2	2008 OFC Men's Olympic Qualifying Tournament	Ellensohn (2), Barbarouses (2), Brockie	—	
41	7 March 2008	Churchill Park, Lautoka (N)	Solomon Islands	2–0	2008 OFC Men's Olympic Qualifying Tournament	Old, Henderson	—	
42	9 March 2008	Churchill Park, Lautoka (N)	Cook Islands	8–0	2008 OFC Men's Olympic Qualifying Tournament	Old, Brockie, Hayne (2), Messam, Ellensohn, Barbarouses, Scott	—	
43	2 July 2008	Newtown Park, Wellington (H)	Chile	1–2	Friendly	Boxall	—	
44	4 July 2008	Porirua Park, Wellington (H)	Chile	1–0	Friendly	Ellensohn	—	
45	12 July 2008	North Sydney Oval, Sydney (A)	Australia	2–3	Friendly	Brockie (2)	—	
46	24 July 2008	Gelora Bung Karno Stadium, Jakarta (A)	Indonesia	1–2	Friendly	Brockie	—	
47	7 August 2008	Shenyang Olympic Stadium, Shenyang (A)	China	1–1	2008 Summer Olympics	Brockie	41,407	
48	10 August 2008	Shenyang Olympic Stadium, Shenyang (N)	Brazil	0–5	2008 Summer Olympics		44,951	
49	13 August 2008	Shanghai Stadium, Shanghai (N)	Belgium	0–1	2008 Summer Olympics		45,202	
50	2 February 2012	Lakeside Stadium, Melbourne (N)	Saudi Arabia	0–3	Friendly		—	
51	16 March 2012	Owen Delany Park, Taupō (H)	Papua New Guinea	1–0	2012 OFC Men's Olympic Qualifying Tournament	Lovemore	550	
52	21 March 2012	Owen Delany Park, Taupō (H)	Tonga	10–0	2012 OFC Men's Olympic Qualifying Tournament	Draper, Hicks, Saric, Fenton (2), Gailbraith (2), Lovemore (2), Musa	200	
53	23 March 2012	Owen Delany Park, Taupō (H)	Vanuatu	3–2	2012 OFC Men's Olympic Qualifying Tournament	Fenton, Musa, Draper	400	
54	25 March 2012	Owen Delany Park, Taupō (H)	Fiji	1–0	2012 OFC Men's Olympic Qualifying Tournament	Draper	1,250	
55	11 July 2012	National Stadium, Tokyo (A)	Japan	1–1	Friendly	Lucas	—	
56	14 July 2012	Seoul World Cup Stadium, Seoul (A)	South Korea	1–2	Friendly	Smeltz	—	
57	20 July 2012	Matrei Stadium, Matrei (N)	United Arab Emirates	2–4	Friendly	Smeltz, Rojas	—	
58	26 July 2012	City of Coventry Stadium, Coventry (N)	Belarus	0–1	2012 Summer Olympics		14,457	
59	29 July 2012	Old Trafford, Manchester (N)	Egypt	1–1	2012 Summer Olympics	Wood	50,050	
60	1 August 2012	St James' Park, Newcastle (N)	Brazil	0–3	2012 Summer Olympics		25,201	
61	3 July 2015	Bisini Sports Complex, Port Moresby (N)	Solomon Islands	2–0	2015 Pacific Games	Patterson, Rufer	—	
62	5 July 2015	Bisini Sports Complex, Port Moresby (A)	Papua New Guinea	1–0	2015 Pacific Games	Patterson	—	
63	7 July 2015	Bisini Sports Complex, Port Moresby (N)	New Caledonia	5–0	2015 Pacific Games	Hudson-Wihongi, Rogerson (3), Prelevic	—	
64	10 July 2015	Bisini Sports Complex, Port Moresby (N)	Vanuatu	0–3	2015 Pacific Games	Patterson, Tuiloma	—	
—	8 July 2019	National Soccer Stadium, Apia (N)	Tonga	13–0	2019 Pacific Games	de Jong, McIsaac (3), Rogerson (5), Heath, Porter (3)	300	
—	10 July 2019	National Soccer Stadium, Apia (A)	Samoa	5–1	2019 Pacific Games	Rogerson (2), Akers, Tipelu, Clark	1,150	
—	12 July 2019	National Soccer Stadium, Apia (N)	Vanuatu	0–0	2019 Pacific Games		900	
—	15 July 2019	National Soccer Stadium, Apia (N)	Papua New Guinea	2–0	2019 Pacific Games	Whyte, Schnell	300	
—	20 July 2019	National Soccer Stadium, Apia (N)	New Caledonia	2–1	2019 Pacific Games	Schnell, Jones	1,200	
65	6 September 2019	WIN Stadium, Wollongong (A)	Australia	1–1	Friendly	Lewis	—	
66	9 September 2019	Campbelltown Stadium, New South Wales (A)	Australia	1–1	Friendly	Rogerson	—	
67	21 September 2019	ANZ National Stadium, Suva (N)	Samoa	6–1	2019 OFC Men's Olympic Qualifying Tournament	Waine (4), Rogerson, Bevan	240	
68	24 September 2019	ANZ National Stadium, Suva (N)	American Samoa	12–0	2019 OFC Men's Olympic Qualifying Tournament	Lewis (2), Rogerson, Whyte, Bevan (5), Waine (2), de Jong	200	
69	27 September 2019	ANZ National Stadium, Suva (N)	Solomon Islands	4–2	2019 OFC Men's Olympic Qualifying Tournament	Lewis, Bevan (2), Billingsley	600	
70	2 October 2019	Churchill Park, Lautoka (A)	Fiji	6–1	2019 OFC Men's Olympic Qualifying Tournament	Wara (o.g.), Waine, Rogerson, Bevan (2), Elliot	150	
71	5 October 2019	Churchill Park, Lautoka (N)	Solomon Islands	5–0	2019 OFC Men's Olympic Qualifying Tournament	Rogerson, Bevan (2), Waine, Jones	200	

Notes

1. A: The men's football tournament at the 2015 Pacific Games doubled as qualifiers for the 2016 Summer Olympics.
2. B: New Zealand advanced to the Olympic Qualifying final with a 2–0 result, but were replaced by Vanuatu on the day of the final after the Oceania Football Confederation found that they had fielded an ineligible player, Deklan Wynne. The match was declared a 3–0 victory for Vanuatu. New Zealand were unable to appeal before the final was played and subsequently announced they would appeal, but on 23 October 2015, the OFC announced that New Zealand's appeal had been rejected, meaning New Zealand's only chance to overturn the decision would be to appeal to the Court of Arbitration for Sport. On 13 November 2015, New Zealand Football confirmed that they would not appeal.
3. C: Senior team.

== Results by opposition ==
Team	Pld	W	D	L	GF	GA	GD	WPCT
American Samoa	2	2	0	0	23	0	+23	100.00
Australia (Note: Football Federation Australia were founder members of the Oceania Football Confederation (OFC) before joining the Asian Football Confederation in 2006.)	14	1	3	10	7	29	−22	7.14
Belarus	1	0	0	1	0	1	−1	0.00
Belgium	1	0	0	1	0	1	−1	0.00
Brazil	2	0	0	2	0	8	−8	0.00
Chile	2	1	0	1	2	2	0	50.00
China	1	0	1	0	1	1	0	0.00
Cook Islands	2	2	0	0	17	0	+17	100.00
Egypt	1	0	1	0	1	1	0	0.00
Fiji	8	6	1	1	22	6	+16	75.00
Indonesia	1	0	0	1	1	2	−1	0.00
Japan	3	0	1	2	1	9	−8	0.00
New Caledonia	4	2	2	0	11	2	+9	50.00
Papua New Guinea	6	6	0	0	19	4	+15	100.00
Samoa	1	1	0	0	6	1	+5	100.00
Saudi Arabia	1	0	0	1	0	3	−3	0.00
Solomon Islands	6	6	0	0	20	3	+17	100.00
South Africa	2	0	0	2	2	4	−2	0.00
South Korea	3	0	0	3	4	9	−5	0.00
Tonga	2	2	0	0	12	0	+12	100.00
United Arab Emirates	1	0	0	1	2	4	−2	0.00
Vanuatu	7	6	0	1	27	8	+19	85.71
Total	71	35	9	27	178	98	+80	49.30

Source: Results

=== Senior teams ===
Team	Pld	W	D	L	GF	GA	GD	WPCT
New Caledonia	1	1	0	0	2	1	+1	100.00
Papua New Guinea	1	1	0	0	2	0	+2	100.00
Samoa	1	1	0	0	5	1	+4	100.00
Tonga	1	1	0	0	13	0	+13	100.00
Vanuatu	1	0	1	0	0	0	0	0.00
Total	5	4	1	0	22	2	+20	80.00

Source: Results

== See also ==
- New Zealand men's national under-23 football team
- New Zealand men's national under-23 football team results (2020–present)
