= 2007–08 New Zealand Football Championship =

NZFC 2007–08
- League: New Zealand Football Championship
- Sport: Association football
- Duration: November 2007-April 2008
- Teams: 8

NZFC Season
- Champions: Waitakere United
- Premiers: Waitakere United
- Top scorer: Graham Little (12)

Youth League
- Champions: bWaitakere United

NZFC seasons
- ← 2006–07 2008–09 →

The 2007–08 New Zealand Football Championship was the fourth season which began on 3 November 2007 and ended on 20 April 2008. Waitakere United won both the premiership and the grand final.

== Team locations ==
Location of teams in the 2007-08 New Zealand Football Championship

== League table ==
Pos	Team	Pld	W	D	L	GF	GA	GD	Pts	Qualification
1	Waitakere United (C)	21	16	3	2	51	14	+37	51	Qualified for the Champions League and Finals
2	Auckland City	21	16	2	3	44	16	+28	50	Qualified for the Champions League and Finals
3	Team Wellington	21	15	2	4	51	21	+30	47	Qualified for the Finals
4	Hawke's Bay United	21	8	5	8	29	33	−4	29	
5	Waikato FC	21	5	5	11	24	34	−10	20	
6	YoungHeart Manawatu	21	5	2	14	32	57	−25	17	
7	Otago United	21	3	4	14	13	43	−30	13	
8	Canterbury United	21	3	3	15	22	48	−26	12	

Source: null
(C) Champions

== Regular season ==
=== Round 1 ===
3 November 2007
15:00

Waitakere United	1 – 2	Team Wellington
Pearce 62'	(Report)	Ellensohn 20'; Halstead 89'

Fred Taylor Park
Attendance: 500
Referee: Michael Hester

3 November 2007
16:00

Otago United	0 – 2	Waikato FC
	(Report)	Gill 32'; Sinkora 82'

Carisbrook
Referee: Kevin Stoltenkamp

4 November 2007
15:00

Canterbury United	1 – 3	Hawke's Bay United
Walker 42'	(Report)	Brockie 69'; Messam 76'; Birnie 86'

English Park
Referee: Peter O'Leary

4 November 2007
15:00

YoungHeart Manawatu	1 – 3	Auckland City FC
Nieres 49' (pen.)	(Report)	Little 27', 55', 85'

FMG Stadium
Referee: Peter O'Leary

=== Round 2 ===
10 November 2007
15:00

Auckland City FC	2 – 0	Hawke's Bay United
Young 55'; Jordan 73'	(Report)

Croatian Club
Referee: Michael Hester

11 November 2007
14:00

Waikato FC	0 – 1	Waitakere United
	(Report)	Menapi 69'

Waikato Stadium
Referee: Nick Waldron

11 November 2007
16:00

Team Wellington	3 – 1	YoungHeart Manawatu
Little 23', Ellensohn 40', 80'	(Report)	Rowe 7'

Newtown Park
Referee: Peter O'Leary

11 November 2007
16:00

Otago United	0 – 0	Canterbury United
	(Report)

Carisbrook
Referee: Matt Conger

=== Round 3 ===
17 November 2007
17:00

Hawke's Bay United	0 – 0	YoungHeart Manawatu
	(Report)

Bluewater Stadium
Referee: James Thian

18 November 2007
14:00

Waikato FC	1 – 2	Team Wellington
Fowler 76'	(Report)	Barron 23', Cheriton 41'

Waikato Stadium
Attendance: 400
Referee: Matt Conger

18 November 2007
16:00

Otago United	0 – 2	Auckland City FC
	(Report)	Urlovic 4', Little 8'

Carisbrook
Referee: Chris Kerr

18 November 2007
16:00

Canterbury United	1 – 3	Waitakere United
Scoullar 16', Pitman (red card) 75'	(Report)	Bale 2', Hay 15', Pearce 26'

English Park
Referee: Jamie Cross

=== Round 4 ===
25 November 2007
15:00

YoungHeart Manawatu	6 – 0	Otago United
Watson 23', Cowan 52', 56', Robinson 53', Rowe 64', Nieres 90'	(Report)

FMG Stadium
Referee: Neil Fox

25 November 2007
15:00

Auckland City FC	1 – 1	Waitakere United
Jordan 80'	(Report)	Totori 56'

Croatian Club
Referee: Peter O'Leary

25 November 2007
15:00

Team Wellington	4 – 3	Hawke's Bay United
Howe 26', Douglas 27', Halstead 29', de Gregorio 71',	(Report)	Smith 36', Fyfe 52', 68'

Newtown Park
Attendance: 1,100
Referee: Jim Murphy

25 November 2007
16:30

Canterbury United	1 – 1	Waikato FC
Own Goal 23'	(Report)	Gill 89' (Penalty kick)

English Park
Referee: James Thian

=== Round 5 ===
1 December 2007
15:00

Waitakere United	3 – 1	YoungHeart Manawatu
Totori 13', 87', Bazeley 54'	(Report)	Sandbrook 36'

Fred Taylor Park
Referee: Chris Kerr

1 December 2007
16:00

Otago United	1 – 2	Hawke's Bay United
Wheeler 31'	(Report)	Brockie 2', Wilson 88'

Carisbrook
Referee: Jamie Cross

2 December 2007
16:00

Waikato FC	2 – 3	Auckland City FC
Gill 47' (Penalty kick), Wilkinson 67'	(Report)	Little 11', 85' (Penalty kick), Sigmund 31'

Waikato Stadium
Referee: Nick Waldron

2 December 2007
16:00

Canterbury United	0 – 1	Team Wellington
	(Report)	Patrick 21'

English Park
Attendance: 350
Referee: Matt Conger

=== Round 6 ===
8 December 2007
14:00

Auckland City FC	4 – 1	YoungHeart Manawatu
Sigmund 62', Jordan 70', Lee 77', Campbell 80'	(Report)	Sanbrook 13', Cowan (red card) 82'

Croatian Club
Referee: Stephen Fletcher

8 December 2007
17:00

Hawke's Bay United	2 – 1	Canterbury United
Fyfe 3', Wilson 30'	(Report)	Walker 26'

Bluewater Stadium
Referee: Neil Fox

9 December 2007
14:00

Waikato FC	3 – 1	Otago United
Simpkins 80', Gill 80', 80' (pen.)	(Report)	J. Lang 90+2'

Waikato Stadium
Referee: Mike Hester

23 December 2007
16:00

Team Wellington	1 – 5	Waitakere United
Patrick 43'	(Report)	Pearce 6', 45', 46' (pen.), Perry 40', Edwards 87'

Newtown Park
Attendance: 1,000
Referee: Neil Fox

=== Round 7 ===
15 December 2007
1:00

Waitakere United	4 – 0	Otago United
Menapi 65', 73', Butler 81', Koprivcic 90+1'	(Report)

Fred Taylor Park
Referee: James Thian

15 December 2007
18:00

Team Wellington	1 – 1	Auckland City FC
Patrick 16'	(Report)	Anello 51'

Newtown Park
Attendance: 800
Referee: James Thian

16 December 2007
14:00

Waikato FC	1 – 1	Hawke's Bay United
Gill 87' (pen.)	(Report)	Henslee 19'

Waikato Stadium
Referee: Stephen Fletcher

16 December 2007
16:00

YoungHeart Manawatu	3 – 2	Canterbury United
Robinson 7', 59', Sandbrook 73'	(Report)	Faichnie 42', Payne 77'

FMG Stadium
Referee: Kevin Stolenkamp

=== Round 8 ===
5 January 2008
15:00

Otago United	2 – 0	Canterbury United
Severs 55', Alvino 64'	(Report)

Carisbrook
Referee: Michael Hester

5 January 2008
16:00

Waitakere United	2 – 0	Waikato FC
Own Goal 13', Totori 32'	(Report)

Fred Taylor Park
Referee: James Thian

5 January 2008
17:00

Hawke's Bay United	0 – 1	Auckland City FC
	(Report)	Sigmund 17', Matthews (red card) 79', Uhlmann (red card) 82'

Bluewater Stadium
Referee: Matt Conger

6 January 2008
15:00

YoungHeart Manawatu	0 – 8	Team Wellington
	(Report)	Little 5', 20', 72'; Corrales 16', 53', 60', Ellensohn 52', Wilson 62',

FMG Stadium
Attendance: 500
Referee: Kevin Stolenkamp

=== Round 9 ===
19 January 2008
16:00

Auckland City FC	3 – 0	Otago United
Kumar 20', Young 70', Coombes 75'	(Report)

Croatian Club
Referee: Kevin Stoltenkamp

20 January 2008
15:00

YoungHeart Manawatu	1 – 3	Hawke's Bay United
Nieres 45+1', Quasnar (red card) 85',	(Report)	Parkin 52', Fyfe 56', Smith 79',

FMG Stadium
Referee: Neil Fox

20 January 2008
16:00

Canterbury United	1 – 9	Waitakere United
Payne 90+1',	(Report)	Hayne 11', 79', Totori 36', 78', Hay 43', Perry 56', Koprivcic 70', Menapi 85', Pearce 88'

English Park
Referee: Antony Riley

20 January 2008
16:00

Team Wellington	2 – 0	Waikato FC
Gulley 58', de Gregorio 60',	(Report)

Newtown Park
Referee: James Thian

=== Round 10 ===
26 January 2008
13:00

Waikato FC	3 – 1	Canterbury United
Waita 18', Holloway 33', 36'	(Report)	McDermott 55'

Waikato Stadium

26 January 2008
16:00

Otago United	0 – 0	YoungHeart Manawatu
	(Report)

Carisbrook
Referee: Steve Fletcher

26 January 2008
16:00

Waitakere United	2 – 0	Auckland City FC
Seaman 9', Totori 33'	(Report)	Coombes (red card) 51'

Fred Taylor Park
Referee: Michael Hester

26 January 2008
17:00

Hawke's Bay United	2 – 2	Team Wellington
Messam 26', 57'	(Report)	Benicio 12', Ellensohn 72'

Bluewater Stadium
Attendance: 500
Referee: Kevin Stolenkamp

=== Round 11 ===
2 February 2008
15:00

Team Wellington	3 – 0	Canterbury United
Little, 47', 77', 82'	(Report)

Porirua Park, Porirua
Attendance: 500
Referee: Peter O'Leary

2 February 2008
16:00

Auckland City FC	2 – 0	Waikato FC
Young, 19'; Lee, 39'	(Report)

Croatian Club
Referee: Neil Fox

2 February 2008
17:00

Hawke's Bay United	3 – 0	Otago United
Messam 13', Brockie 88'; Taylor 89'	(Report)	Own Goal 16'

Bluewater Stadium
Referee: Nick Waldron

3 February 2008
15:00

YoungHeart Manawatu	3 – 2	Waitakere United
Nieres 61', 72'; Cowan 90+1'	(Report)	Totori 26', Koprivcic 52'

FMG Stadium
Referee: Antony Riley

=== Round 12 ===
6 February 2008
14:00

Otago United	1 – 1	Waitakere United

Carisbrook

6 February 2008
15:00

Canterbury United	2 – 3	YoungHeart Manawatu

English Park

6 February 2008
15:00

Auckland City FC	2 – 0	Team Wellington

Croatian Club
Attendance: 1,000

6 February 2008
17:00

Hawke's Bay United	0 – 0	Waikato FC

Bluewater Stadium

=== Round 13 ===
19 February 2008
16:00

Waitakere United	5 – 0	Hawke's Bay United

Fred Taylor Park

10 February 2008
14:00

Waikato FC	3 – 2	YoungHeart Manawatu

Waikato Stadium

10 February 2008
15:00

Team Wellington	1 – 0	Otago United

Newtown Park

10 February 2008
16:00

Canterbury United	1 – 2	Auckland City FC

English Park

=== Round 14 ===
13 January 2008
16:00

Team Wellington	0 – 1	Waitakere United
(red card) 71' Birch	(Report)

Newtown Park
Referee: Peter O'Leary

16 February 2008
15:00

Auckland City FC	4 – 1	YoungHeart Manawatu

Croatian Club

16 February 2008
14:00

Waikato FC	0 – 2	Otago United

Links Ave, Tauranga

17 February 2008
15:00

Canterbury United	2–1	Hawke's Bay United

English Park

=== Round 15 ===
23 February 2008
16:00

Auckland City FC	4 – 1	Canterbury United

Croatian Club

23 February 2008
17:00

Hawke's Bay United	0 – 1	Waitakere United

Bluewater Stadium

24 February 2008
14:00

Otago United	0 – 5	Team Wellington

Carisbrook

24 February 2008
15:00

YoungHeart Manawatu	0 – 1	Waikato FC

FMG Stadium

=== Round 16 ===
1 March 2008
16:00

Waitakere United	2 – 0	Waikato FC

North Harbour Stadium, North Shore City

2 March 2008
15:00

YoungHeart Manawatu	0 – 4	Team Wellington

FMG Stadium
Attendance: 300

2 March 2008
16:00

Canterbury United	2 – 0	Otago United

English Park

2 March 2008
17:00

Hawke's Bay United	2 – 0	Auckland City FC

Bluewater Stadium

=== Round 17 ===
8 March 2008
16:00

Waitakere United	1 – 0	Canterbury United

North Harbour Stadium, North Shore City

8 March 2008
16:00

Team Wellington	2 – 0	Waikato FC

Newtown Park
Attendance: 400

9 March 2008
15:00

YoungHeart Manawatu	2 – 3	Hawke's Bay United

FMG Stadium

9 March 2008
15:00

Auckland City FC	2 – 0	Otago United

Croatian Club

=== Round 18 ===
15 March 2008
16:00

Otago United	1 – 0	YoungHeart Manawatu

Carisbrook

15 March 2008
16:00

Waitakere United	1 – 0	Auckland City FC

Douglas Field

15 March 2008
17:00

Hawke's Bay United	0 – 3	Team Wellington

Bluewater Stadium
Attendance: 600

16 March 2008
13:00

Waikato FC	1 – 1	Canterbury United

Links Ave, Tauranga

=== Round 19 ===
22 March 2008
16:00

Auckland City FC	2 – 0	Waikato FC

Kiwitea Street
Referee: Antony Riley

22 March 2008
17:00

Hawke's Bay United	2 – 1	Otago United

Bluewater Stadium

23 March 2008
16:00

YoungHeart Manawatu	1 – 2	Waitakere United

Memorial Park

23 March 2008
16:00

Team Wellington	2 – 0	Canterbury United

Newtown Park
Attendance: 407

=== Round 20 ===
13 January 2008
16:00

Canterbury United	0 – 3	Auckland City FC
	(Report)	Little 13', Young 56', 82'

English Park
Referee: Neil Fox

29 March 2008
16:00

Waitakere United	2 – 0	Hawke's Bay United

Douglas Field

30 March 2008
14:00

Waikato FC	4 – 5	YoungHeart Manawatu

Links Ave, Tauranga

30 March 2008
15:00

Team Wellington	3 – 1	Otago United

Newtown Park
Attendance: 407

=== Round 21 ===
6 April 2008
15:00

Otago United	2 – 2	Waitakere United

Caledonian Ground

6 April 2008
15:00

YoungHeart Manawatu	1 – 5	Canterbury United

FMG Stadium

6 April 2008
15:00

Auckland City FC	3 – 2	Team Wellington

Kiwitea Street
Attendance: 998

6 April 2008
15:00

Hawke's Bay United	2 – 2	Waikato FC

Bluewater Stadium

== Finals ==
The top 3 ranked teams of the regular season will qualify for the NZFC playoffs. Teams ranked second and third will play off in a preliminary final, the winner of which playing the first ranked team in the grand final.

=== Bracket ===
Elimination Final
13 April 2008
2 Auckland City	3
3 Team Wellington	4

Grand Final
20 April 2008
1 Waitakere United	2
3 Team Wellington	0

=== Preliminary Finals ===
13 April 2008
15:00

Auckland City FC	3 – 4	Team Wellington
Campbell 70'; Chan-Goo 73'; Suri 90+30'	(Report)	Little 24' 90+18'; Halstead 86' 90+26'

Kiwitea Street
Attendance: 984
Referee: Peter O'Leary

=== Grand Final ===
20 April 2008
15:00

Waitakere United	2 – 0	Team Wellington
Own Goal 45'; Pearce 66'	(Report)

Douglas Field
Attendance: 2,011
Referee: Mike Hester
