= Peverley =

Peverley is a surname. Notable people with the surname include:

- Cole Peverley (born 1988), New Zealand footballer
- Rich Peverley (born 1982), Canadian ice hockey player
