= Sandbrook =

Sandbrook is a surname. Notable people with the surname include:

- Dominic Sandbrook (born 1974), British historian, author, columnist, and television presenter
- Ian Sandbrook (born 1983), New Zealand cricketer
- Richard Sandbrook (1946–2005), British administrator
