= Mesny =

Mesny is a French surname. Notable people with the surname include:

- Gustave Mesny (1886–1945), French Army general and war crime victim of the Second World War
- William Mesny (1842–1919), adventurer and writer from Jersey
