= Football at the 2008 Summer Olympics – Men's team squads =

This article lists the team squads of Men's Football at the 2008 Summer Olympics. Each nation had to submit a squad of 18 players, 15 of which had to be born on or after 1 January 1985, and 3 of which could have been older dispensation players, by 23 July 2008. A minimum of two goalkeepers (plus one optional dispensation goalkeeper) had to be included in the squad.

== Group A ==
=== Argentina ===
The following is the Argentina squad in the men's football tournament of the 2008 Summer Olympics.

Head coach: Sergio Batista

No.	Pos.	Player	Date of birth (age)	Caps	Goals	Club
1	GK	Óscar Ustari	3 July 1986 (aged 22)	1	0	(Royal Spanish Football Federation) Getafe
2	DF	Ezequiel Garay	10 October 1986 (aged 21)	1	0	(Royal Spanish Football Federation) Real Madrid
3	DF	Fabián Monzón	13 April 1987 (aged 21)	0	0	(Argentine Football Association) Boca Juniors
4	DF	Pablo Zabaleta	16 January 1985 (aged 23)	5	0	(Royal Spanish Football Federation) Espanyol
5	MF	Fernando Gago	10 April 1986 (aged 22)	9	0	(Royal Spanish Football Federation) Real Madrid
6	DF	Federico Fazio	17 March 1987 (aged 21)	0	0	(Royal Spanish Football Federation) Sevilla
7	MF	José Sosa	19 June 1985 (aged 23)	2	0	(German Football Association) Bayern Munich
8	MF	Éver Banega	29 June 1988 (aged 20)	0	0	(Royal Spanish Football Federation) Valencia
9	FW	Ezequiel Lavezzi	3 May 1985 (aged 23)	2	0	(Italian Football Federation) Napoli
10	MF	Juan Román Riquelme* (c)	24 June 1978 (aged 30)	42	18	(Argentine Football Association) Boca Juniors
11	MF	Ángel Di María	14 February 1988 (aged 20)	0	0	(Portuguese Football Federation) Benfica
12	DF	Nicolás Pareja*	18 January 1984 (aged 24)	0	0	(Royal Belgian Football Association) Anderlecht
13	FW	Lautaro Acosta	14 March 1988 (aged 20)	0	0	(Royal Spanish Football Federation) Sevilla
14	MF	Javier Mascherano*	8 June 1984 (aged 24)	37	2	(The Football Association) Liverpool
15	FW	Lionel Messi	24 June 1987 (aged 21)	26	8	(Royal Spanish Football Federation) Barcelona
16	FW	Sergio Agüero	2 June 1988 (aged 20)	7	2	(Royal Spanish Football Federation) Atlético Madrid
17	FW	Diego Buonanotte	19 April 1988 (aged 20)	0	0	(Argentine Football Association) River Plate
18	GK	Sergio Romero	22 February 1987 (aged 21)	0	0	(Royal Dutch Football Association) AZ
22	GK	Nicolás Navarro (Note: Replaces Óscar Ustari who was injured during the competition)	25 March 1985 (aged 23)	0	0	(Italian Football Federation) Napoli

* Over-aged player.

=== Australia ===
The following is the Australia squad in the men's football tournament of the 2008 Summer Olympics.

Head coach: Graham Arnold

No.	Pos.	Player	Date of birth (age)	Caps	Goals	Club
1	GK	Adam Federici	31 January 1985 (aged 23)	0	0	(The Football Association) Reading
2	DF	Jade North*	7 January 1982 (aged 26)	0	0	(Football Australia) Newcastle Jets
3	DF	Adrian Leijer	25 March 1986 (aged 22)	20	1	(The Football Association) Fulham
4	DF	Mark Milligan (c)	4 August 1985 (aged 23)	18	5	(Football Australia) Newcastle Jets
5	DF	Matthew Špiranović	27 June 1988 (aged 20)	1	0	(German Football Association) FC Nurnberg
6	DF	Nikolai Topor-Stanley	11 March 1985 (aged 23)	21	4	(Football Australia) Perth Glory
7	MF	Neil Kilkenny	19 December 1985 (aged 22)	6	0	(The Football Association) Leeds United
8	MF	Stuart Musialik	29 March 1985 (aged 23)	12	0	(Football Australia) Sydney FC
9	FW	Mark Bridge	7 November 1985 (aged 22)	17	3	(Football Australia) Sydney FC
10	FW	Archie Thompson*	23 October 1978 (aged 29)	0	0	(Football Australia) Melbourne Victory
11	MF	David Carney*	30 November 1983 (aged 24)	0	0	(The Football Association) Sheffield United
12	DF	Trent McClenahan	4 February 1985 (aged 23)	12	0	(The Football Association) Hereford United
13	MF	Ruben Zadkovich	23 May 1986 (aged 22)	19	1	(The Football Association) Derby County
14	MF	James Troisi	3 July 1988 (aged 20)	7	2	(Turkish Football Federation) Gençlerbirliği
15	MF	Kristian Sarkies	25 October 1986 (aged 21)	16	7	(Football Australia) Adelaide United
16	MF	Billy Celeski	14 July 1985 (aged 23)	6	0	(Football Australia) Melbourne Victory
17	FW	Nikita Rukavytsya	22 June 1987 (aged 21)	6	1	(Football Australia) Perth Glory
18	GK	Tando Velaphi	17 April 1987 (aged 21)	6	0	(Football Australia) Perth Glory
21	FW	Matt Simon (Note: Replaces Archie Thompson who was injured during the competition)	22 January 1986 (aged 22)	0	0	(Football Australia) Central Coast Mariners

* Over-aged player.

=== Ivory Coast ===
The following is the Ivory Coast squad in the men's football tournament of the 2008 Summer Olympics.

Head coach: (France) Gérard Gili

No.	Pos.	Player	Date of birth (age)	Caps	Goals	Club
1	GK	Vincent de Paul Angban	2 February 1985 (aged 23)	0	0	(Ivorian Football Federation) ASEC Mimosas
2	DF	Serge Wawa	1 January 1986 (aged 22)	0	0	(Ivorian Football Federation) ASEC Mimosas
3	DF	Diarrasouba Viera	21 December 1986 (aged 21)	0	0	(Romanian Football Federation) CFR Cluj
4	DF	Souleymane Bamba	13 January 1985 (aged 23)	0	0	(Scottish Football Association) Dunfermline
5	DF	Angoua Brou Benjamin	28 November 1986 (aged 21)	0	0	(Hungarian Football Federation) Budapest Honvéd
6	MF	Hervé Kambou	1 May 1985 (aged 23)	0	0	(French Football Federation) Bastia
7	MF	Kafoumba Coulibaly	26 October 1985 (aged 22)	0	0	(French Football Federation) Nice
8	FW	Salomon Kalou	5 August 1985 (aged 23)	0	0	(The Football Association) Chelsea
9	FW	Franck Dja Djedje	2 June 1986 (aged 22)	0	0	(French Football Federation) Grenoble
10	MF	Emmanuel Koné	31 December 1986 (aged 21)	0	0	(Romanian Football Federation) CFR Cluj
11	MF	Anthony Moura-Komenan	20 January 1986 (aged 22)	0	0	(French Football Federation) Libourne-Saint-Seurin
12	DF	Mamadou Bagayoko	31 December 1989 (aged 18)	0	0	(Ivorian Football Federation) Africa Sports
13	FW	Abraham Guié	25 July 1986 (aged 22)	0	0	(Hungarian Football Federation) Budapest Honvéd
14	FW	Gervinho (c)	27 May 1987 (aged 21)	0	0	(French Football Federation) Le Mans
15	DF	Mekeme Tamla Ladji	19 September 1985 (aged 22)	0	0	(French Football Federation) Laval
16	GK	Christian Fabrice Okoua	8 November 1991 (aged 16)	0	0	(Ivorian Football Federation) Africa Sports
17	FW	Antoine N'Gossan	30 November 1990 (aged 17)	0	0	(Ivorian Football Federation) ASEC Mimosas
18	FW	Sekou Cissé	23 May 1985 (aged 23)	0	0	(Royal Dutch Football Association) Roda JC

* Over-aged player.

=== Serbia ===
The following is the Serbia squad in the men's football tournament of the 2008 Summer Olympics.

Head coach: Miroslav Đukić

No.	Pos.	Player	Date of birth (age)	Caps	Goals	Club
1	GK	Vladimir Stojković* (c)	28 July 1983 (aged 25)	25	0	(Portuguese Football Federation) Sporting CP
2	DF	Marko Jovanović	26 March 1988 (aged 20)	2	0	(Football Association of Serbia) Partizan
3	DF	Aleksandar Kolarov	10 November 1985 (aged 22)	12	2	(Italian Football Federation) Lazio
4	MF	Gojko Kačar	26 January 1987 (aged 21)	17	0	(German Football Association) Hertha BSC
5	DF	Slobodan Rajković	3 February 1989 (aged 19)	15	0	(Royal Dutch Football Association) Twente
6	MF	Predrag Pavlović	19 June 1986 (aged 22)	4	0	(Football Association of Serbia) Napredak Kruševac
7	MF	Milan Smiljanić	19 November 1986 (aged 21)	18	1	(Royal Spanish Football Federation) Espanyol
8	MF	Nikola Gulan	23 March 1989 (aged 19)	6	0	(Italian Football Federation) Fiorentina
9	FW	Đorđe Rakić	31 October 1985 (aged 22)	18	2	(Austrian Football Association) Red Bull Salzburg
11	DF	Duško Tošić	19 January 1985 (aged 23)	23	1	(German Football Association) Werder Bremen
12	FW	Dušan Tadić	20 November 1988 (aged 19)	6	0	(Football Association of Serbia) Vojvodina
13	MF	Ljubomir Fejsa	14 August 1988 (aged 19)	4	0	(Football Association of Serbia) Partizan
14	FW	Miljan Mrdaković*	9 May 1982 (aged 26)	0	0	(Portuguese Football Federation) Vitória de Guimarães
15	MF	Aleksandar Živković*	28 July 1977 (aged 31)	6	0	(Chinese Football Association) Shandong Luneng
16	DF	Nenad Tomović	30 August 1987 (aged 20)	2	0	(Football Association of Serbia) Red Star Belgrade
17	MF	Zoran Tošić	28 April 1987 (aged 21)	14	1	(Football Association of Serbia) Partizan
18	GK	Saša Stamenković	5 January 1985 (aged 23)	0	0	(Football Association of Serbia) Napredak Kruševac
19	FW	Andrija Kaluđerović	5 July 1987 (aged 21)	4	0	(Football Association of Serbia) OFK Beograd

* Over-aged player.

== Group B ==
=== Japan ===
The following is the Japan squad in the men's football tournament of the 2008 Summer Olympics.

Head coach: Yasuharu Sorimachi

No.	Pos.	Player	Date of birth (age)	Caps	Goals	Club
1	GK	Shusaku Nishikawa	18 June 1986 (aged 22)	0	0	(Japan Football Association) Oita Trinita
2	MF	Hajime Hosogai	10 June 1986 (aged 22)	0	0	(Japan Football Association) Urawa Red Diamonds
3	DF	Maya Yoshida	24 August 1988 (aged 19)	0	0	(Japan Football Association) Nagoya Grampus
4	DF	Hiroki Mizumoto (c)	12 September 1985 (aged 22)	1	0	(Japan Football Association) Kyoto Sanga
5	DF	Yuto Nagatomo	12 September 1986 (aged 21)	3	0	(Japan Football Association) FC Tokyo
6	DF	Masato Morishige	21 May 1987 (aged 21)	0	0	(Japan Football Association) Oita Trinita
7	DF	Atsuto Uchida	27 March 1988 (aged 20)	9	1	(Japan Football Association) Kashima Antlers
8	MF	Keisuke Honda	13 June 1986 (aged 22)	1	0	(Royal Dutch Football Association) VVV-Venlo
9	FW	Yohei Toyoda	11 April 1985 (aged 23)	0	0	(Japan Football Association) Montedio Yamagata
10	MF	Yohei Kajiyama	24 September 1985 (aged 22)	0	0	(Japan Football Association) FC Tokyo
11	FW	Shinji Okazaki	16 April 1986 (aged 22)	0	0	(Japan Football Association) Shimizu S-Pulse
12	MF	Hiroyuki Taniguchi	27 June 1985 (aged 23)	0	0	(Japan Football Association) Kawasaki Frontale
13	DF	Michihiro Yasuda	20 December 1987 (aged 20)	5	0	(Japan Football Association) Gamba Osaka
14	FW	Shinji Kagawa	17 March 1989 (aged 19)	3	0	(Japan Football Association) Cerezo Osaka
15	FW	Takayuki Morimoto	7 May 1988 (aged 20)	0	0	(Italian Football Federation) Catania
16	MF	Takuya Honda	17 April 1985 (aged 23)	0	0	(Japan Football Association) Shimizu S-Pulse
17	FW	Tadanari Lee	19 December 1985 (aged 22)	0	0	(Japan Football Association) Kashiwa Reysol
18	GK	Kaito Yamamoto	10 July 1985 (aged 23)	0	0	(Japan Football Association) Shimizu S-Pulse

* Over-aged player.

=== Netherlands ===
The following is the Netherlands squad in the men's football tournament of the 2008 Summer Olympics.

Head coach: Foppe de Haan

No.	Pos.	Player	Date of birth (age)	Caps	Goals	Club
1	GK	Piet Velthuizen	3 November 1986 (aged 21)	0	0	(Royal Dutch Football Association) Vitesse
2	DF	Gianni Zuiverloon	30 December 1986 (aged 21)	0	0	(The Football Association) West Bromwich Albion
3	DF	Dirk Marcellis	13 April 1988 (aged 20)	0	0	(Royal Dutch Football Association) PSV
4	DF	Kew Jaliens*	15 September 1978 (aged 29)	10	0	(Royal Dutch Football Association) AZ
5	DF	Erik Pieters	7 August 1988 (aged 19)	0	0	(Royal Dutch Football Association) PSV
6	MF	Kees Luyckx	11 February 1986 (aged 22)	0	0	(Royal Dutch Football Association) AZ
7	MF	Jonathan de Guzmán	13 September 1987 (aged 20)	0	0	(Royal Dutch Football Association) Feyenoord
8	MF	Urby Emanuelson	16 June 1986 (aged 22)	11	0	(Royal Dutch Football Association) Ajax
9	FW	Roy Makaay* (c)	9 March 1975 (aged 33)	43	6	(Royal Dutch Football Association) Feyenoord
10	FW	Gerald Sibon*	19 April 1974 (aged 34)	0	0	(Royal Dutch Football Association) Heerenveen
11	FW	Ryan Babel	19 December 1986 (aged 21)	25	5	(The Football Association) Liverpool
12	MF	Hedwiges Maduro	13 February 1985 (aged 23)	12	0	(Royal Spanish Football Federation) Valencia
13	DF	Calvin Jong-a-Pin	18 August 1986 (aged 21)	0	0	(Royal Dutch Football Association) Heerenveen
14	MF	Evander Sno	9 April 1987 (aged 21)	0	0	(Scottish Football Association) Celtic
15	MF	Royston Drenthe	8 April 1987 (aged 21)	0	0	(Royal Spanish Football Federation) Real Madrid
16	FW	Roy Beerens	22 December 1987 (aged 20)	0	0	(Royal Dutch Football Association) Heerenveen
17	MF	Otman Bakkal	27 February 1985 (aged 23)	0	0	(Royal Dutch Football Association) PSV
18	GK	Kenneth Vermeer	10 January 1986 (aged 22)	0	0	(Royal Dutch Football Association) Ajax

* Over-aged player.

=== Nigeria ===
The following is the Nigeria squad in the men's football tournament of the 2008 Summer Olympics.

Head coach: Samson Siasia

No.	Pos.	Player	Date of birth (age)	Caps	Goals	Club
1	GK	Ambruse Vanzekin	14 July 1986 (aged 22)	30	0	(Nigeria Football Federation) Akwa United
2	DF	Chibuzor Okonkwo	16 December 1988 (aged 19)	8	0	(Nigeria Football Federation) Bayelsa United
4	DF	Onyekachi Apam	30 December 1986 (aged 21)	30	1	(French Football Federation) Nice
5	DF	Dele Adeleye	25 December 1988 (aged 19)	27	0	(Royal Dutch Football Association) Sparta Rotterdam
6	DF	Monday James	19 October 1986 (aged 21)	19	0	(Nigeria Football Federation) Bayelsa United
7	FW	Chinedu Obasi	1 June 1986 (aged 22)	25	6	(German Football Association) TSG 1899 Hoffenheim
8	MF	Sani Kaita	2 May 1986 (aged 22)	25	1	(Royal Dutch Football Association) Sparta Rotterdam
9	FW	Victor Obinna	25 March 1987 (aged 21)	29	11	(Italian Football Federation) Chievo
10	FW	Isaac Promise (c)	2 December 1987 (aged 20)	27	9	(Turkish Football Federation) Trabzonspor
11	FW	Solomon Okoronkwo	2 March 1987 (aged 21)	6	0	(German Football Association) Hertha BSC
12	MF	Oluwafemi Ajilore	18 January 1985 (aged 23)	3	0	(Royal Dutch Football Association) Groningen
13	DF	Olubayo Adefemi	13 August 1985 (aged 22)	27	5	(Israel Football Association) Hapoel Bnei Lod
14	FW	Peter Odemwingie*	15 July 1981 (aged 27)	25	6	(Russian Football Union) Lokomotiv Moscow
15	DF	Efe Ambrose	18 October 1988 (aged 19)	0	0	(Nigeria Football Federation) Kaduna United
16	FW	Victor Anichebe	23 April 1988 (aged 20)	5	2	(The Football Association) Everton
17	MF	Emmanuel Ekpo	20 December 1987 (aged 20)	6	3	(United States Soccer Federation) Columbus Crew
18	GK	Ikechukwu Ezenwa	16 October 1988 (aged 19)	26	0	(Nigeria Football Federation) Ocean Boys
19	MF	Oladapo Olufemi	11 May 1988 (aged 20)	12	0	(Portuguese Football Federation) Boavista

* Over-aged player.

=== United States ===
The following is the United States squad in the men's football tournament of the 2008 Summer Olympics.

Head coach: (Poland) Piotr Nowak

No.	Pos.	Player	Date of birth (age)	Caps	Goals	Club
1	GK	Chris Seitz	12 March 1987 (aged 21)	7	0	(United States Soccer Federation) Real Salt Lake
2	DF	Marvell Wynne	8 May 1986 (aged 22)	5	0	(Canadian Soccer Association) Toronto FC
3	DF	Michael Orozco	7 February 1986 (aged 22)	4	0	(Mexican Football Federation) San Luis
4	MF	Michael Bradley	31 July 1987 (aged 21)	0	0	(Royal Dutch Football Association) Heerenveen
5	MF	Dax McCarty	30 April 1987 (aged 21)	5	0	(United States Soccer Federation) FC Dallas
6	DF	Maurice Edu	18 April 1986 (aged 22)	5	0	(Canadian Soccer Association) Toronto FC
7	MF	Stuart Holden	1 August 1985 (aged 23)	6	0	(United States Soccer Federation) Houston Dynamo
8	MF	Danny Szetela	17 June 1987 (aged 21)	0	0	(Italian Football Federation) Brescia
9	FW	Charlie Davies	25 June 1986 (aged 22)	6	1	(Swedish Football Association) Hammarby
10	MF	Benny Feilhaber	19 January 1985 (aged 23)	1	0	(The Football Association) Derby County
11	FW	Freddy Adu	2 June 1989 (aged 19)	3	4	(French Football Federation) Monaco
12	FW	Jozy Altidore	6 November 1989 (aged 18)	6	0	(Royal Spanish Football Federation) Villarreal
13	DF	Patrick Ianni	15 June 1985 (aged 23)	5	1	(United States Soccer Federation) Houston Dynamo
14	MF	Robbie Rogers	12 May 1987 (aged 21)	2	1	(United States Soccer Federation) Columbus Crew
15	DF	Michael Parkhurst*	24 January 1984 (aged 24)	0	0	(United States Soccer Federation) New England Revolution
16	MF	Sacha Kljestan	9 September 1985 (aged 22)	7	1	(United States Soccer Federation) Chivas USA
17	FW	Brian McBride* (c)	19 June 1972 (aged 36)	0	0	(United States Soccer Federation) Chicago Fire
18	GK	Brad Guzan*	9 September 1984 (aged 23)	0	0	(The Football Association) Aston Villa

* Over-aged player.

Alternates

- Dominic Cervi (goalkeeper)
- Frankie Hejduk (defender)
- Robbie Findley (forward)

== Group C ==
=== Belgium ===
The following is the Belgium squad in the men's football tournament of the 2008 Summer Olympics.

Head coach: Jean-François De Sart

No.	Pos.	Player	Date of birth (age)	Caps	Goals	Club
1	GK	Logan Bailly	27 December 1985 (aged 22)	13	0	(Royal Belgian Football Association) Racing Genk
2	DF	Sepp De Roover*	12 November 1984 (aged 23)	7	0	(Royal Dutch Football Association) Groningen
3	DF	Vincent Kompany	10 April 1986 (aged 22)	1	0	(German Football Association) Hamburger SV
4	DF	Thomas Vermaelen	14 November 1985 (aged 22)	16	1	(Royal Dutch Football Association) Ajax
5	DF	Sébastien Pocognoli	1 August 1987 (aged 21)	19	1	(Royal Dutch Football Association) AZ
6	MF	Marouane Fellaini	22 November 1987 (aged 20)	10	0	(Royal Belgian Football Association) Standard Liège
7	FW	Tom De Mul	4 March 1986 (aged 22)	32	5	(Royal Spanish Football Federation) Sevilla
8	MF	Faris Haroun	22 September 1985 (aged 22)	30	5	(Royal Belgian Football Association) Racing Genk
9	FW	Kevin Mirallas	5 October 1987 (aged 20)	12	6	(French Football Federation) Lille
10	MF	Jan Vertonghen	24 April 1987 (aged 21)	6	0	(Royal Dutch Football Association) Ajax
11	MF	Maarten Martens* (c)	2 July 1984 (aged 24)	32	8	(Royal Dutch Football Association) AZ
12	GK	Yves Ma-Kalambay	31 January 1986 (aged 22)	9	0	(Scottish Football Association) Hibernian
13	DF	Laurent Ciman	5 August 1985 (aged 23)	22	1	(Royal Belgian Football Association) Club Brugge
14	MF	Landry Mulemo	17 September 1986 (aged 21)	18	0	(Royal Belgian Football Association) Standard Liège
15	DF	Jeroen Simaeys	12 May 1985 (aged 23)	3	0	(Royal Belgian Football Association) Club Brugge
16	MF	Anthony Vanden Borre	24 October 1987 (aged 20)	15	2	(Italian Football Federation) Genoa
17	FW	Stijn De Smet	27 March 1985 (aged 23)	25	3	(Royal Belgian Football Association) Cercle Brugge
18	FW	Mousa Dembélé	16 July 1987 (aged 21)	2	0	(Royal Dutch Football Association) AZ
19	MF	Vadis Odjidja-Ofoe (Note: Replaces Stijn De Smet who was injured during the competition)	2 February 1989 (aged 19)	3	0	(German Football Association) Hamburger SV
22	GK	Yves De Winter (Note: Replaces Vincent Kompany who was returned to his club during the competition)	25 May 1987 (aged 21)	6	0	(Royal Belgian Football Association) Westerlo

* Over-aged player.

=== Brazil ===
The following is the Brazil squad in the men's football tournament of the 2008 Summer Olympics.

Head coach: Dunga

No.	Pos.	Player	Date of birth (age)	Caps	Goals	Club
1	GK	Diego Alves	24 June 1985 (aged 23)	1	0	(Royal Spanish Football Federation) Almería
2	DF	Rafinha	7 September 1985 (aged 22)	1	0	(German Football Association) Schalke 04
3	DF	Alex Silva	10 March 1985 (aged 23)	1	0	(Brazilian Football Confederation) São Paulo
4	DF	Thiago Silva*	22 September 1984 (aged 23)	0	0	(Brazilian Football Confederation) Fluminense
5	MF	Hernanes	29 May 1985 (aged 23)	1	0	(Brazilian Football Confederation) São Paulo
6	DF	Marcelo	12 May 1988 (aged 20)	0	0	(Royal Spanish Football Federation) Real Madrid
7	MF	Anderson	13 April 1988 (aged 20)	0	0	(The Football Association) Manchester United
8	MF	Lucas	9 January 1987 (aged 21)	1	0	(The Football Association) Liverpool
9	FW	Alexandre Pato	2 September 1989 (aged 18)	2	1	(Italian Football Federation) Milan
10	MF	Ronaldinho* (c)	21 March 1980 (aged 28)	19	15	(Italian Football Federation) Milan
11	MF	Ramires	24 March 1987 (aged 21)	2	0	(Brazilian Football Confederation) Cruzeiro
12	GK	Renan	24 January 1985 (aged 23)	2	0	(Brazilian Football Confederation) Internacional
13	DF	Ilsinho	12 October 1985 (aged 22)	0	0	(Ukrainian Association of Football) Shakhtar Donetsk
14	DF	Breno	13 October 1989 (aged 18)	2	0	(German Football Association) Bayern Munich
15	MF	Diego	28 February 1985 (aged 23)	13	5	(German Football Association) Werder Bremen
16	MF	Thiago Neves	27 February 1985 (aged 23)	1	0	(Brazilian Football Confederation) Fluminense
17	FW	Rafael Sóbis	17 June 1985 (aged 23)	1	0	(Royal Spanish Football Federation) Real Betis
18	FW	Jô	20 March 1987 (aged 21)	0	0	(The Football Association) Manchester City

* Over-aged player.

=== China ===
The following is the China squad in the men's football tournament of the 2008 Summer Olympics.

Head coach: Yin Tiesheng

No.	Pos.	Player	Date of birth (age)	Caps	Goals	Club
1	GK	Qiu Shengjiong	1 September 1985 (aged 22)	6	0	(Chinese Football Association) Shanghai Shenhua
2	DF	Tan Wangsong	19 December 1985 (aged 22)	14	2	(Chinese Football Association) Tianjin Teda
3	DF	Feng Xiaoting	22 October 1985 (aged 22)	20	5	(Chinese Football Association) Dalian Shide
4	DF	Yuan Weiwei	25 November 1985 (aged 22)	16	2	(Chinese Football Association) Shandong Luneng
5	DF	Li Weifeng*	1 December 1978 (aged 29)	106	15	(Chinese Football Association) Shanghai Shenhua
6	MF	Zhou Haibin	19 July 1985 (aged 23)	41	8	(Chinese Football Association) Shandong Luneng
7	FW	Hao Junmin	24 March 1987 (aged 21)	15	3	(Chinese Football Association) Tianjin Teda
8	MF	Zheng Zhi* (c)	20 August 1980 (aged 27)	78	23	(The Football Association) Charlton Athletic
9	FW	Gao Lin	14 February 1986 (aged 22)	16	5	(Chinese Football Association) Shanghai Shenhua
10	FW	Han Peng*	13 September 1983 (aged 24)	23	6	(Chinese Football Association) Shandong Luneng
11	MF	Chen Tao	11 March 1985 (aged 23)	31	11	(Chinese Football Association) Changsha Ginde
12	MF	Cui Peng	31 May 1987 (aged 21)	13	1	(Chinese Football Association) Shandong Luneng
13	MF	Shen Longyuan	2 March 1985 (aged 23)	14	2	(Chinese Football Association) Shanghai Shenhua
14	DF	Wan Houliang	25 February 1986 (aged 22)	6	0	(Chinese Football Association) Shaanxi Chanba
15	FW	Jiang Ning	1 September 1986 (aged 21)	11	4	(Chinese Football Association) Qingdao Jonoon
16	MF	Zhao Xuri	3 December 1985 (aged 22)	19	5	(Chinese Football Association) Dalian Shide
17	FW	Dong Fangzhuo	23 January 1985 (aged 23)	26	3	(The Football Association) Manchester United
18	GK	Liu Zhenli	26 June 1985 (aged 23)	4	0	(Chinese Football Association) Qingdao Jonoon
20	FW	Zhu Ting (Note: Replaces Chen Tao who was injured during the competition)	15 July 1985 (aged 23)	21	3	(Chinese Football Association) Dalian Shide

* Over-aged player.

=== New Zealand ===
The following is the New Zealand squad in the men's football tournament of the 2008 Summer Olympics.

Head coach: Stu Jacobs

No.	Pos.	Player	Date of birth (age)	Caps	Goals	Club
1	GK	Jacob Spoonley	3 March 1987 (aged 21)	0	0	(New Zealand Football) Wellington Phoenix
2	DF	Aaron Scott	18 July 1986 (aged 22)	0	0	(New Zealand Football) Waikato FC
3	DF	Ian Hogg	15 December 1989 (aged 18)	0	0	(New Zealand Football) Hawke's Bay United
4	MF	Cole Peverley	3 July 1988 (aged 20)	0	0	(New Zealand Football) Hawke's Bay United
5	DF	Ryan Nelsen* (c)	18 October 1977 (aged 30)	32	6	(The Football Association) Blackburn Rovers
6	DF	Michael Boxall	18 August 1988 (aged 19)	0	0	(United States Soccer Federation) UC Santa Barbara
7	MF	Simon Elliott*	10 June 1974 (aged 34)	48	6	(The Football Association) Fulham
8	FW	Craig Henderson	24 June 1987 (aged 21)	0	0	(United States Soccer Federation) Dartmouth College
9	FW	Daniel Ellensohn	9 August 1985 (aged 22)	1	0	(New Zealand Football) Team Wellington
10	FW	Chris Killen*	8 October 1981 (aged 26)	21	8	(Scottish Football Association) Celtic
11	MF	Jeremy Brockie	7 October 1987 (aged 20)	7	0	(New Zealand Football) Hawke's Bay United
12	DF	Steven Old	17 February 1986 (aged 22)	14	1	(Football Australia) Macarthur Rams
13	MF	Shaun van Rooyen	27 April 1987 (aged 21)	0	0	(New Zealand Football) Waikato FC
14	DF	Cole Tinkler	5 May 1986 (aged 22)	0	0	(New Zealand Football) Team Wellington
15	FW	Greg Draper	13 August 1989 (aged 18)	0	0	(New Zealand Football) Wellington Phoenix
16	DF	Sam Jenkins	17 February 1987 (aged 21)	0	0	(New Zealand Football) Hawke's Bay United
17	FW	Sam Messam	2 March 1986 (aged 22)	0	0	(New Zealand Football) Hawke's Bay United
18	GK	Liam Little	27 July 1986 (aged 22)	0	0	(New Zealand Football) Otago United

* Over-aged player.

== Group D ==
=== Cameroon ===
The following is the Cameroon squad in the men's football tournament of the 2008 Summer Olympics.

Head coach: Martin Ndtoungou

No.	Pos.	Player	Date of birth (age)	Caps	Goals	Club
1	GK	Amour Patrick Tignyemb (c)	14 June 1985 (aged 23)	0	0	(Cameroonian Football Federation) Tonnerre Yaoundé
2	MF	Albert Baning	9 March 1985 (aged 23)	0	0	(French Football Federation) Paris Saint-Germain
3	DF	Antonio Ghomsi*	22 April 1984 (aged 24)	0	0	(Italian Football Federation) Messina
4	DF	André Bikey	8 January 1985 (aged 23)	0	0	(The Football Association) Reading
5	DF	Alex Song	9 September 1987 (aged 20)	0	0	(The Football Association) Arsenal
6	DF	Stéphane Mbia	20 May 1986 (aged 22)	0	0	(French Football Federation) Stade Rennes
7	FW	Marc Mboua	26 February 1987 (aged 21)	0	0	(Royal Dutch Football Association) Cambuur
8	MF	Georges Mandjeck	9 December 1988 (aged 19)	0	0	(German Football Association) VfB Stuttgart
9	MF	Franck Songo'o	14 May 1987 (aged 21)	0	0	(The Football Association) Portsmouth
10	FW	Christian Bekamenga	9 May 1986 (aged 22)	0	0	(French Football Federation) Nantes
11	FW	Gustave Bebbe*	22 June 1982 (aged 26)	0	0	(Turkish Football Federation) Ankaragücü
12	DF	Paul Rolland Bebey Kingué	9 November 1986 (aged 21)	0	0	(Cameroonian Football Federation) Les Astres
13	DF	Nicolas N'Koulou	27 March 1990 (aged 18)	0	0	(French Football Federation) Monaco
14	MF	Aurélien Chedjou	20 June 1985 (aged 23)	0	0	(French Football Federation) Lille
15	MF	Serge N'Gal	13 January 1986 (aged 22)	0	0	(Portuguese Football Federation) União de Leiria
16	GK	Joslain Mayebi	14 October 1986 (aged 21)	0	0	(Israel Football Association) Hakoah Ramat Gan
17	MF	Alain Junior Ollé Ollé	11 April 1987 (aged 21)	0	0	(German Football Association) SC Freiburg
18	DF	Alexis Enam	25 November 1986 (aged 21)	0	0	(Tunisian Football Federation) Club Africain
22	DF	Adiaba Bondoa (Note: Replaces Alexis Enam who was injured during the competition)	2 January 1987 (aged 21)	0	0	(Slovak Football Association) Dunajská Streda

* Over-aged player.

=== Honduras ===
The following is the Honduras squad in the men's football tournament of the 2008 Summer Olympics.

Head coach: (Honduras) Gilberto Yearwood

No.	Pos.	Player	Date of birth (age)	Caps	Goals	Club
1	GK	Kevin Hernández	21 December 1985 (aged 22)	0	0	(National Autonomous Federation of Football of Honduras) Victoria
2	DF	Quiarol Arzu	3 March 1985 (aged 23)	0	0	(National Autonomous Federation of Football of Honduras) Platense
3	DF	David Molina	14 March 1988 (aged 20)	0	0	(National Autonomous Federation of Football of Honduras) Motagua
4	DF	Samuel Caballero*	24 December 1974 (aged 33)	0	0	(Chinese Football Association) Changchun Yatai
5	DF	Erick Norales	2 November 1985 (aged 22)	0	0	(National Autonomous Federation of Football of Honduras) Marathón
6	DF	Óscar Morales	12 May 1986 (aged 22)	0	0	(National Autonomous Federation of Football of Honduras) Real España
7	MF	Emil Martínez*	9 September 1982 (aged 25)	0	0	(Chinese Football Association) Shanghai Shenhua
8	MF	Rigoberto Padilla	1 December 1985 (aged 22)	0	0	(National Autonomous Federation of Football of Honduras) Hispano
9	FW	Carlos Pavón*	9 October 1973 (aged 34)	0	0	(National Autonomous Federation of Football of Honduras) Real España
10	MF	Ramón Núñez	14 November 1985 (aged 22)	0	0	(National Autonomous Federation of Football of Honduras) Olimpia
11	FW	Luis Rodas	3 January 1985 (aged 23)	0	0	(National Autonomous Federation of Football of Honduras) Motagua
12	MF	Jorge Claros	8 January 1986 (aged 22)	0	0	(National Autonomous Federation of Football of Honduras) Motagua
13	MF	Hendry Thomas (c)	23 February 1985 (aged 23)	0	0	(National Autonomous Federation of Football of Honduras) Olimpia
14	FW	Jefferson Bernardez	27 March 1987 (aged 21)	0	0	(National Autonomous Federation of Football of Honduras) Motagua
15	FW	Luis López	29 August 1986 (aged 21)	0	0	(National Autonomous Federation of Football of Honduras) Marathón
16	MF	Marvin Sánchez	2 November 1986 (aged 21)	0	0	(National Autonomous Federation of Football of Honduras) Platense
17	DF	David Álvarez	5 December 1985 (aged 22)	0	0	(National Autonomous Federation of Football of Honduras) Marathón
18	GK	Obed Enamorado	15 September 1985 (aged 22)	0	0	(National Autonomous Federation of Football of Honduras) Vida
20	MF	Edder Delgado (Note: Replaces Erick Norales who was injured during the competition)	20 November 1986 (aged 21)	0	0	(National Autonomous Federation of Football of Honduras) Real España
21	FW	José Guity (Note: Replaces Carlos Pavón who was injured during the competition)	19 May 1985 (aged 23)	0	0	(National Autonomous Federation of Football of Honduras) Marathón

* Over-aged player.

=== Italy ===
The following is the Italy squad in the men's football tournament of the 2008 Summer Olympics.

Head coach: Pierluigi Casiraghi

No.	Pos.	Player	Date of birth (age)	Caps	Goals	Club
1	GK	Emiliano Viviano	1 December 1985 (aged 22)	30	0	(Italian Football Federation) Brescia
2	DF	Marco Motta	14 May 1986 (aged 22)	52	6	(Italian Football Federation) Udinese
3	DF	Paolo De Ceglie	17 September 1986 (aged 21)	13	2	(Italian Football Federation) Juventus
4	MF	Antonio Nocerino (c)	9 April 1985 (aged 23)	39	0	(Italian Football Federation) Palermo
5	MF	Luca Cigarini	20 June 1986 (aged 22)	21	1	(Italian Football Federation) Parma
6	DF	Domenico Criscito	30 December 1986 (aged 21)	34	3	(Italian Football Federation) Genoa
7	MF	Riccardo Montolivo	18 January 1985 (aged 23)	35	4	(Italian Football Federation) Fiorentina
8	MF	Claudio Marchisio	19 January 1986 (aged 22)	9	1	(Italian Football Federation) Juventus
9	FW	Tommaso Rocchi*	19 September 1977 (aged 30)	18	7	(Italian Football Federation) Lazio
10	FW	Sebastian Giovinco	26 January 1987 (aged 21)	37	7	(Italian Football Federation) Juventus
11	FW	Giuseppe Rossi	1 February 1987 (aged 21)	38	15	(Royal Spanish Football Federation) Villarreal
12	MF	Daniele Dessena	10 May 1987 (aged 21)	22	6	(Italian Football Federation) Sampdoria
13	DF	Andrea Coda	25 April 1985 (aged 23)	44	1	(Italian Football Federation) Udinese
14	FW	Robert Acquafresca	11 September 1987 (aged 20)	22	8	(Italian Football Federation) Cagliari
15	DF	Salvatore Bocchetti	30 November 1986 (aged 21)	6	0	(Italian Football Federation) Genoa
16	DF	Lorenzo De Silvestri	23 May 1988 (aged 20)	50	23	(Italian Football Federation) Lazio
17	MF	Ignazio Abate	12 November 1986 (aged 21)	17	2	(Italian Football Federation) Torino
18	GK	Andrea Consigli	27 January 1987 (aged 21)	41	0	(Italian Football Federation) Atalanta
20	MF	Antonio Candreva (Note: Replaces Claudio Marchisio who was injured during the competition)	28 February 1987 (aged 21)	28	1	(Italian Football Federation) Livorno
21	FW	Andrea Russotto (Note: Replaces Tommaso Rocchi who was injured during the competition)	25 March 1988 (aged 20)	44	11	(Italian Football Federation) Napoli

* Over-aged player.

=== South Korea ===
The following is the South Korea squad in the men's football tournament of the 2008 Summer Olympics.

Head coach: Park Sung-hwa

No.	Pos.	Player	Date of birth (age)	Caps	Goals	Club
1	GK	Jung Sung-ryong	4 January 1985 (aged 23)	0	0	(Korea Football Association) Seongnam Ilhwa Chunma
2	DF	Shin Kwang-hoon	18 March 1987 (aged 21)	0	0	(Korea Football Association) Pohang Steelers
3	DF	Kim Dong-jin*	29 January 1982 (aged 26)	36	2	(Russian Football Union) Zenit St. Petersburg
4	DF	Kang Min-soo	14 February 1986 (aged 22)	0	0	(Korea Football Association) Jeonbuk Hyundai Motors
5	DF	Kim Chang-soo	12 September 1985 (aged 22)	0	0	(Korea Football Association) Busan IPark
6	DF	Kim Jin-kyu (c)	16 February 1985 (aged 23)	25	3	(Korea Football Association) FC Seoul
7	MF	Oh Jang-eun	24 July 1985 (aged 23)	0	0	(Korea Football Association) Ulsan Hyundai
8	MF	Kim Jung-woo*	9 May 1982 (aged 26)	0	0	(Korea Football Association) Seongnam Ilhwa Chunma
9	FW	Shin Young-rok	27 March 1987 (aged 21)	0	0	(Korea Football Association) Suwon Samsung Bluewings
10	FW	Park Chu-young	10 July 1985 (aged 23)	19	5	(Korea Football Association) FC Seoul
11	MF	Lee Chung-yong	2 July 1988 (aged 20)	0	0	(Korea Football Association) FC Seoul
12	MF	Ki Sung-yueng	24 January 1989 (aged 19)	0	0	(Korea Football Association) FC Seoul
13	MF	Kim Seung-yong	14 March 1985 (aged 23)	0	0	(Korea Football Association) Gwangju Sangmu
14	MF	Baek Ji-hoon	28 February 1985 (aged 23)	12	0	(Korea Football Association) Suwon Samsung Bluewings
15	DF	Kim Kun-hoan	12 August 1986 (aged 21)	0	0	(Korea Football Association) Kyung Hee University
16	FW	Cho Young-cheol	31 May 1989 (aged 19)	0	0	(Japan Football Association) Yokohama FC
17	FW	Lee Keun-ho	11 April 1985 (aged 23)	0	0	(Korea Football Association) Daegu FC
18	GK	Song Yoo-geol	16 February 1985 (aged 23)	0	0	(Korea Football Association) Incheon United

* Over-aged player.
