= Liam Messam =

NZ international rugby union player

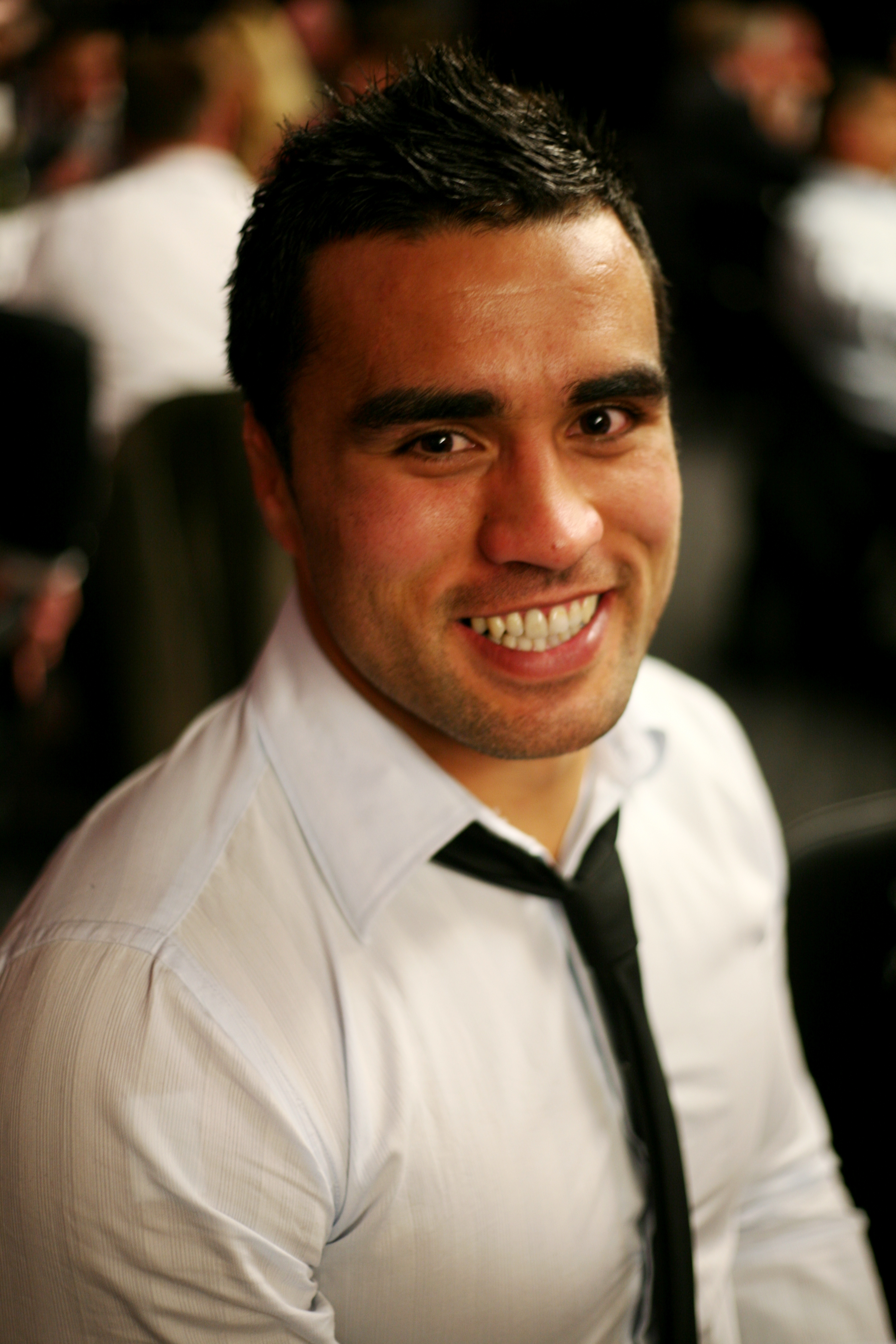
- Messam in 2010
- Born: Liam Justin Messam; 25 March 1984 (age 42) Blenheim, New Zealand
- Height: 1.90 m (6 ft 3 in)
- Weight: 109 kg (240 lb)
- School: Rotorua Boys' High School
- Notable relative: Sam Messam (brother)

Rugby union career
- Position(s): Blindside Flanker, Number 8
Amateur team(s)
Years	Team	Apps	(Points)
2005–2016	Hautapu RFC		
Senior career
Years	Team	Apps	(Points)
2015–2018	Toshiba Brave Lupus	26	(15)
2018–2020	Toulon	38	(25)
- Correct as of 11 May 2021
Provincial / State sides
Years	Team	Apps	(Points)
2003–	Waikato	104	(148)
- Correct as of 15 September 2022
Super Rugby
Years	Team	Apps	(Points)
2006–15, 17–18, 21–	Chiefs	184	(160)
- Correct as of 11 May 2021
International career
Years	Team	Apps	(Points)
2008–2015	New Zealand	43	(30)
- Correct as of 11 May 2021
National sevens team
Years	Team		Comps
	New Zealand		21
- Correct as of 11 May 2021
- Boxing career
- Height: 190 cm (6 ft 3 in)
- Weight class: Heavyweight

Boxing record
- Total fights: 7
- Wins: 7
- Win by KO: 1
- Losses: 1
- Draws: 1
Medal record
Men's rugby sevens
Representing New Zealand
Commonwealth Games
Gold medal – first place	2006 Melbourne	Team competition
Gold medal – first place	2010 Delhi	Team competition

Liam Justin Messam (born 25 March 1984) is a New Zealand retired rugby union player who last played in the TOP14 for RC Toulonnais. In Super Rugby, he previously played for the Chiefs, and for Waikato in the ITM Cup. Messam predominantly played as a blindside flanker but could fill in at Number 8 as well as openside flanker. After the retirement of then Chiefs captain Mils Muliaina, Messam was named the team's new co-captain from 2012 onwards, alongside Aaron Cruden.

He is also a professional boxer.

== Rugby career ==
=== National team ===
In October 2008, Messam was selected in New Zealand's end of year tour squad to tour Hong Kong and Europe. He played one test against Scotland and one match against Munster. He subsequently appeared several more times for New Zealand but was dropped a month out of the 2011 Rugby World Cup in favour of Victor Vito. Since his debut in 2008 he won 40 test caps for the All Blacks.

In 2004, at the age of just 20, he captained the New Zealand sevens team to its fifth IRB Sevens World Series title and in 2005 led the team to the final. Messam also played in the New Zealand sevens teams that won gold at the 2006 Commonwealth Games and 2010 Commonwealth Games. In 2004 he was also named New Zealand Sevens Player of the Year.

=== 2015–present ===
Messam was selected for the 2015 Rugby World Cup as part of the All Blacks' 31-man squad. After the tournament was finished, Messam announced his intention to compete in rugby sevens for the Rio Olympics 2016. Messam was later named in the All Black Sevens' squad for the Wellington Sevens alongside All Blacks teammate, Sonny Bill Williams. After the Rio Olympics 2016, Messam played for the Chiefs in 2012 Super Rugby season, when injuries greatly affected the loose forward's positions.

=== Leading of the Haka ===
Of the 43 tests he played in Messam was the haka leader in 21 of them. He led the Ka Mate version of the haka nine times; as well as the newer Kapa o Pango haka, twelve times (the third highest number led).

== Professional boxing career ==
Messam made his professional boxing debut in January 2015 against Rhys Sullivan on a Sonny Bill Williams undercard. Messam won the fight by unanimous decision. Messam returned to the ring six years later to fight in a professional fight for charity to raise funds for Tauranga 8-year-old Antonio Pohatu-Barbarich who is being treated for brain cancer. Messam took on Joe Ageli in his return fight in April 2021, winning by unanimous decision. Since returning to professional boxing, he has started training with Hit Fitness HQ under retired professional boxing, Cairo George. In the same camp is Olympic Bronze medalist David Nyika. Messam returned one year later in New Plymouth, taking on Thomas Russell. Messam won his third professional fight by unanimous decision. After a charity fight under Fight for Life, Messam returned to the professional ring in July 2022 against Tussi Asafo. Messam won his first win by stoppage. In December, Messam finished his 2022 boxing year by taking on Mathew Matich. Messam won the fight by Unanimous Decision.

=== Record ===
9 fights	7 wins	1 loss
By knockout	1	0
By decision	6	1
Draws	1	

No.	Result	Record	Opponent	Type	Round, time	Date	Location	Notes
7	Win	7–0	Darryl Takerei	UD	4	May 25, 2024	TSB Stadium, New Plymouth, New Zealand	
6	Win	6–0	Kyle Mereweather	UD	4	Nov 23, 2023	YMCA Stadium, Hamilton, New Zealand	
5	Win	5–0	Mathew Matich	UD	4	Dec 3, 2022	Grassroots Trust Velodrome, Cambridge, New Zealand	
4	Win	4–0	Tussi Asafo	TKO	2 (4)	Jul 30, 2022	YMCA Stadium, Hamilton, New Zealand	
3	Win	3–0	Thomas Russell	UD	4	May 13, 2022	TSB Stadium, New Plymouth, New Zealand	
2	Win	2–0	Joe Ageli	UD	4	Apr 17, 2021	Don Rowlands Event Centre, Lake Karapiro, New Zealand	
1	Win	1–0	Rhys Sullivan	UD	4	Jan 31, 2015	Qudos Bank Arena, New South Wales, Australia	

== Personal life ==
Messam's brother, Sam Messam, played in the All Whites side at the 2008 Beijing Olympics.

Throughout his professional athlete career, Messam developed a preference for natural alternative health options to relieve both physical pain and mental challenges high-profile athletes experience. After witnessing the detrimental effect conventional pain relief and mental health medication has on close friends and family, Messam founded Ora CBD alongside Teddy Stanaway in 2020.

=== Maori ===
Of Māori descent, Messam affiliates to the Ngāi Tūhoe iwi. Messam has stated that he also has Samoan and Scottish heritage. He has played for the New Zealand Maori, including during the 2006 Churchill Cup and the 2010 centenary series, where he captained the side. In 2012 and 2013 Messam was awarded the Tom French Cup as Māori Player of the Year.

Awards
Preceded by Piri Weepu	Tom French Memorial; Māori rugby union player of the year 2012, 2013	Succeeded by Aaron Smith
