= 2008 OFC Men's Olympic Qualifying Tournament =

2008 OFC U-23 Olympic Qualifying Tournament
Tournament details
- Host country: Fiji
- Dates: 1–9 March 2008
- Teams: 6 (from 1 confederation)
- Venue: 1 (in 1 host city)

Final positions
- Champions: New Zealand (2nd title)
- Runners-up: Solomon Islands
- Third place: Fiji
- Fourth place: Papua New Guinea

Tournament statistics
- Matches played: 15
- Goals scored: 89 (5.93 per match)
- Top scorer(s): (Solomon Islands) Benjamin Totori (Fiji) Malakai Tiwa (8 goals)

The 2008 OFC Men's Olympic Football Tournament functioned as the qualifying tournament to the association football competition at the 2008 Summer Olympics in Beijing for the member nations of the Oceania Football Confederation (OFC). The tournament consisted of a single round-robin tournament played in Fiji from 1 March to 9 March 2008. New Zealand won the tournament and qualified for the 2008 Olympic Games.

== Final standings ==
Pos	Team	Pld	W	D	L	GF	GA	GD	Pts	Qualification	(New Zealand)	(Solomon Islands)	(Fiji)	(Papua New Guinea)	(Vanuatu)	(Cook Islands)
1	New Zealand	5	5	0	0	19	3	+16	15	Qualification for 2008 Summer Olympics	—	2–0	2–1	—	—	—
2	Solomon Islands	5	4	0	1	25	5	+20	12		—	—	3–2	—	5–0	11–0
3	Fiji (H)	5	3	0	2	21	6	+15	9		—	—	—	7–1	—	9–0
4	Papua New Guinea	5	2	0	3	18	20	−2	6		2–5	1–6	—	—	—	—
5	Vanuatu	5	1	0	4	6	16	−10	3		0–2	—	0–2	2–7	—	—
6	Cook Islands	5	0	0	5	0	39	−39	0		0–8	—	—	0–7	0–4	—

Source: RSSSF
(H) Hosts

== Matches ==
1 March 2008
14:00 UTC+12

New Zealand	2–1	Fiji
Peverley 33'; Old 90'		Tiwa 41'

Churchill Park, Lautoka
Referee: Job Minan (Papua New Guinea)

1 March 2008
16:30 UTC+12

Cook Islands	0–4	Vanuatu
		Nimanian 16'; Sakama 47' (pen.); Chillia 83'

Churchill Park, Lautoka
Referee: Rakesh Varman (Fiji)

1 March 2008
19:00 UTC+12

Papua New Guinea	1–6	Solomon Islands
Apo 65'		Totori 9', 16', 68'; Nawo 12'; Rande 51'; Saie 80'

Churchill Park, Lautoka
Referee: Peter O'Leary (New Zealand)

3 March 2008
14:30 UTC+12

Solomon Islands	11–0	Cook Islands
Rande 9'; Maemae 17', 24'; Totori 47', 56', 68', 75'; Nawo 62'; Waroi 77', 78'; Forau 82'

Churchill Park, Lautoka
Referee: Fiti Aimaasu (Samoa)

3 March 2008
17:00 UTC+12

Fiji	7–1	Papua New Guinea
Suwamy 18'; Tiwa 23', 55', 68'; Dunadamu 32', 70'; Rao 76'		Winnie 72'

Churchill Park, Lautoka
Referee: Lencie Fred (Vanuatu)

3 March 2008
19:30 UTC+12

Vanuatu	0–2	New Zealand
		Barbarouses 15'; Brockie 40'

Churchill Park, Lautoka
Referee: Norbert Huata (Tahiti)

5 March 2008
14:30 UTC+12

Fiji	9–0	Cook Islands
Singh 16', 23', 58'; Krishna 38'; Tiwa 59', 75', 76'; Rao 66'; Samy 81'

Churchill Park, Lautoka
Referee: Andrew Moli (Solomon Islands)

5 March 2008
17:00 UTC+12

Papua New Guinea	2–5	New Zealand
Gunemba 17', 86'		Ellensohn 43', 58'; Barbarouses 60', 69'; Brockie 85'

Churchill Park, Lautoka
Referee: Rakesh Varman (Fiji)

5 March 2008
19:30 UTC+12

Solomon Islands	5–0	Vanuatu
Maemae 39', 62', 75'; Totori 55'; Nawo 73'

Churchill Park, Lautoka
Referee: Michael Hester (New Zealand)

7 March 2008
14:30 UTC+12

New Zealand	2–0	Solomon Islands
Old 5'; Henderson 69'

Churchill Park, Lautoka
Referee: Lencie Fred (Vanuatu)

7 March 2008
17:00 UTC+12

Cook Islands	0–7	Papua New Guinea
		Muta 16'; Winnie 19', 50'; Gunemba 29'; Upaiga 54'; Mobbs 64'; Hans 75'

Churchill Park, Lautoka
Referee: Norbert Huata (Tahiti)

7 March 2008
19:30 UTC+12

Vanuatu	0–2	Fiji
		Tiwa 28' (pen.); Krishna 41'

Churchill Park, Lautoka
Referee: Peter O'Leary (New Zealand)

9 March 2008
12:00 UTC+12

Cook Islands	0–8	New Zealand
		Old 8'; Brockie 16'; Hayne 52', 79'; Messam 64'; Ellensohn 67'; Barbarouses 75'; Scott 90+2'

Churchill Park, Lautoka
Referee: Job Minan (Papua New Guinea)

9 March 2008
14:30 UTC+12

Vanuatu	2–7	Papua New Guinea
Kaltack 52'; Masauvakolo 79'		Kini 10'; Winnie 13', 68', 90+2'; Muta 18' (pen.); Gunemba 63'; Upaiga 75'

Churchill Park, Lautoka
Referee: Rakesh Varman (Fiji) (First half)
Andrew Moli (Solomon Islands) (Second half)

9 March 2008
17:00 UTC+12

Solomon Islands	3–2	Fiji
Waroi 28', 42'; Fifii 39'		Krishna 6'; Dunadamu 23'

Churchill Park, Lautoka
Referee: Michael Hester (New Zealand)

2008 OFC Olympic Qualification Championship

New Zealand
Second title

== Goal scorers ==
8 goals

- (Solomon Islands) Benjamin Totori
- (Fiji) Malakai Tiwa

6 goals

- (Papua New Guinea) Tau Winnie

5 goals

- (Solomon Islands) Alick Maemae

4 goals

- (New Zealand) Costa Barbarouses
- (Solomon Islands) Joachim Waroi
- (Papua New Guinea) Raymond Gunemba

3 goals

- (New Zealand) Steven Old
- (New Zealand) Jeremy Brockie
- (New Zealand) Daniel Ellensohn
- (Fiji) Alvin Singh
- (Fiji) Roy Krishna
- (Fiji) Macui Dunadamu
- (Solomon Islands) Jason Nawo

2 goals

- (New Zealand) Jason Hayne
- (Fiji) Shameel Rao
- (Solomon Islands) Joachim Rande
- (Papua New Guinea) David Muta
- (Papua New Guinea) Koriak Upaiga
- (Vanuatu) Jefferey Nimanian

1 goal

- (Fiji) Avinesh Waran Suwamy
- (Fiji) Krishna Samy
- (New Zealand) Cole Peverley
- (New Zealand) Craig Henderson
- (New Zealand) Sam Messam
- (New Zealand) Aaron Scott
- (Solomon Islands) Franklin Forau
- (Solomon Islands) Nelson Saie Kilifa
- (Solomon Islands) Michael Fifii
- (Papua New Guinea) William Mobbs
- (Papua New Guinea) Samuel Kini
- (Papua New Guinea) Neil Hans
- (Papua New Guinea) Mathias Apo
- (Vanuatu) Francois Sakama
- (Vanuatu) Tony Chillia
- (Vanuatu) Michael Kaltack
- (Vanuatu) Fenedy Masauvakolo
