= William Gill (explorer) =

Captain William John Gill (10 September 1843 – 11 August 1882) was an English explorer and British army officer. He was born in Bangalore, India, the second child and elder son of the army officer, artist and photographer Major Robert Gill (1804 - 1879) and his wife Frances Flowerdew Gill (née Rickerby) (1817 - 1887).

Portrait of William Gill by T.B. Wirgman (1848-1925) with Gill's signature below

== Biography ==
=== Early life and education ===
William Gill's father, Robert Gill, served in the 44th Madras Native Infantry and married William's mother, Frances Rickerby, in 1841. Robert Gill was on furlough in Bangalore when William was born there on 10 September 1843. The following autumn, Robert Gill was appointed by the East India Company to copy the murals in the Buddhist rock-cut temples at Ajanta in the Aurangabad district, Maharashtra. This was in response to a petition by the Royal Asiatic Society to the Court of Directors of the East India Company to make copies of the frescoes before they were destroyed by decay and tourism.

The Gill family lived for some years in the Bara Duree, the local palace at Ajanta that had served as a field hospital and temporary residence for the Duke of Wellington during the battle of Assaye (1803). Mrs Gill was still there with the children in 1850, when William was seven years old, but by 1856 she had moved to Brighton, leaving William's father to his hunting, drawing, painting, photography and his first Indian mistress Paroo in Ajanta. Mrs Gill and the children lived adjacent to Brighton College, which William attended as a day boy. He left the school in June 1861 with the first prizes for mathematics and divinity.

After six months studying under a private tutor, William Gill, aged 19, was admitted to the Royal Military Academy at Woolwich. In June 1864, when not quite 21, he was commissioned in the Royal Engineers. Gill spent the following nine years as an officer in the Royal Engineers, mostly based in Britain but also serving 18 months in India, from September 1869 to March 1871. Shortly before his return from India, he inherited a considerable fortune from Frederick Heusch of Wimbledon. Heusch, a childless man of Dutch descent, was a distant relative of William Gill's mother. Gill decided to stay in the army and use his fortune to pursue his love of travel and exploration while at the same time gathering intelligence to serve British national interests.

=== Persia ===
William Gill's first major expedition began in April 1873, two years after his return from India. He accompanied the distinguished cavalry officer Colonel Valentine Baker on an eight-month exploration of Persia and adjacent territories. Baker and Gill travelled to Tbilisi (Tiflis) in Georgia thence to Baku in Azerbaijan. Having crossed the Caspian Sea, they travelled to Ashgabat in Turkmenistan, from which they hoped to explore and survey the Atrak valley. This proved impossible at that time, so they headed towards Tehran in Persia (now Iran), crossing the Alborz mountains via a pass more than 2 miles above sea level. They skirted Mount Damavand, descended into the Mazandaran forests, recrossed the mountains to Damghan, then visited Mashhad. They then travelled to the fortress of Kilat-i-Nadir, which until then had been shown on British maps in two separate locations. Next, Baker and Gill trekked to Dargaz in the Kopet Dag Mountains. Dargaz was shown on the best British maps merely as a small town whereas in reality it was a large and thriving autonomous Kurdish district. Here William Gill was lucky to survive when he dropped his shotgun and it discharged at his feet. (His thick leather boots saved him.) Later, Baker and Gill succeeded in their original ambition of exploring the upper Atrak valley. This again revealed the poor quality of existing British maps of the region. Baker and Gill's survey work was to prove important in settling a boundary dispute between Persia and Russia, as it enabled Britain to support the Shah of Persia's position on a factual basis.

=== Parliamentary ambition ===
In April 1874, a few months after his return from Persia, William Gill stood as a parliamentary candidate for the Conservative party in a by-election at Hackney, a safe Liberal seat. He substantially raised the Tory vote but failed to get elected. He made a second attempt to become a Member of Parliament six years later in Nottingham but again failed.

=== China and Eastern Tibet ===
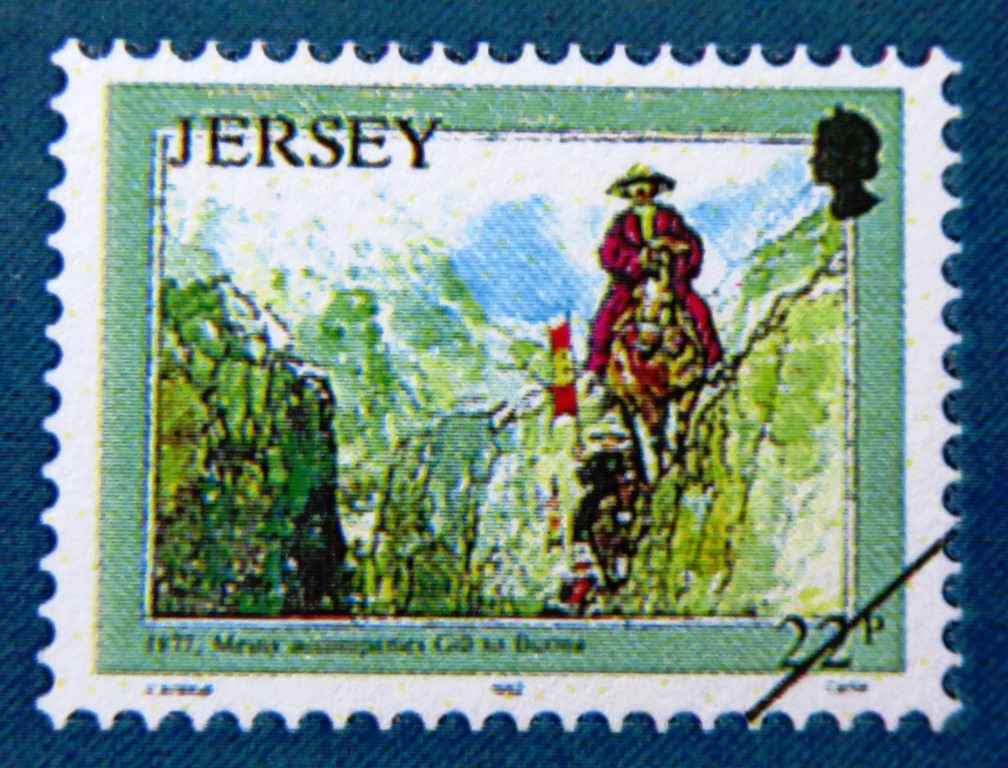
Jersey postage stamp showing Gill exploring with General William Mesny

In 1876, William Gill decided to explore China. He took advice from the eminent geographer Colonel Henry Yule at the India Office. He also consulted Thomas Thornville Cooper in London and Baron Ferdinand von Richtofen in Berlin. Cooper was the first European, other than French Roman Catholic missionaries, to penetrate the mountains west of Sichuan, whereas von Richtofen was widely considered the leading western expert on China. Gill travelled by train from Berlin to Marseille and thence by sea to Hong Kong, Shanghai and Tianjin, the main port for Beijing (Peking). He reached the British legation at Beijing on 21 September 1876 and four days later set off on a five-week journey with Mr Carles of the legation staff, a Chinese servant, a horse-boy, three baggage carts and a team of locally recruited porters. The party headed north-east, crossed the Great Wall and went as far as the border of Liaodong. They then turned back to the coast, reaching it where the wall meets the sea. For the second half of the tour, Gill and his party proceeded parallel to the coast as far as the Luan estuary before crossing the flat country back to Tianjin and Beijing. Gill described this “cycle of Cathay” as “a useful prelude and preparation for the more serious work to follow”.

On 23 January 1877, Gill set off from Shanghai with his servants. He was accompanied by Edward Colborne Baber, the British representative at Chongqing, which they reached via a succession of boats on the Yangtze river on 8 April. For his main expedition, Gill had arranged to travel with William Mesny as his guide and companion. Mesny was a Jersey-born Briton who had long worked for the Chinese and was knowledgeable about all aspects of Chinese culture and lifestyle. Knowing that Mesny would not arrive for some weeks, Gill journeyed to Chengdu, the capital of Sichuan. From there he made a month-long 400 mile circular journey in the mountains of northern Sichuan, becoming the first European to do so. Gill arrived back at Chengdu about 20 June 1877, just before Mesny's arrival.

Strained political tensions between Russia and Britain prevented Gill from following his original planned route. Instead, he and Mesny agreed to travel via eastern Tibet to northern Burma (Myanmar). They set out on 10 July 1877 with their servants and 60 porters. They entered eastern Tibet via Tachienlu (Kangding). From there, Gill, Mesny and their party climbed to the Tibetan plateau, which is mostly more than 2 miles above sea level. Passing through Litang, they reached Batang in the valley of a tributary of the Jinsha River, then regarded by Europeans as the true upper Yangtze. Jinsha means “golden sand” and Gill named his book on the expedition The River of Golden Sand. Crossing the Jinsha, the party followed its valley or the ridge between it and the upper Mekong valley for 24 days to Dali City (Talifu), the western capital of Yunnan. Up to that point, Gill had surveyed the entire route and measured the altitude with aneroid barometers and a hypsometer. They were now in known territory, as Edward Colborne Baber had already surveyed the route from Dali to the Irrawaddy while investigating the murder of Gill's schoolmate Augustus Margary.

Gill and Mesny arrived at Bhamo in Burma on 1 November 1877, where they met Thomas Cooper, whose advice Gill had sought in London. Cooper was now the local British political agent; he was murdered five months later. From Bhamo, the party took a steamer down the Irrawaddy River to Rangoon and then travelled by sea to Calcutta, where they disbanded. William Gill's scientific work, including the Chinese expeditions and the resulting 42 sheets of maps, was recognised on 26 May 1879, when the Royal Geographical Society awarded him their Patron's Medal. The following year, the Geographical Society of Paris awarded Gill a gold medal.

Subsequently, at the behest of the British government, Gill wrote a paper on the Chinese army. He presented this on 30 April 1880 at a meeting chaired by Sir Rutherford Alcock. The paper was subsequently printed by the royal printers, Harrison and Sons, for private circulation.

=== Aftermath of the Russo-Turkish war ===
On his return to England from India, William Gill was formally appointed to the War Office's intelligence branch. In the Balkans, the Russo-Turkish war was coming to an end and peace negotiations were under way. Early in 1878, Gill was sent with a friend to the Balkans, the pair posing as tourists in an effort to gather intelligence about the situation in Romania and Bulgaria. The occupying Russians quickly saw through the cover story and sent Gill and his companion home.

In the spring of 1879, Gill was sent to Istanbul (then Constantinople) as assistant boundary commissioner for the new border between Turkey and Russia, as required by the Treaty of Berlin. He returned to England in the autumn.

=== Aftermath of the second Anglo-Afghan war ===
After the British defeat by Afghan tribesmen at the battle of Maiwand in July 1880, William Gill was sent to Afghanistan. The survivors of the battle took refuge at Kandahar (Qandahar) but by the time Gill arrived in the region, they had been relieved by General Sir Frederick Sleigh Roberts, 1st Earl Roberts, who marched 10,000 soldiers 320 miles in 23 days from Kabul. Gill therefore joined Sir Charles Macgregor in his almost bloodless campaign against the Mari tribesmen in Balochistan (now part of Pakistan). Macgregor was compiler of the “Gazetteer of Central Asia”; Gill served him as a survey officer and was mentioned in despatches.

After this mission, Gill was due some leave. He travelled by sea from Karachi in Sind (now part of Pakistan) to Bandar Abbas in southern Persia (now Iran). He then embarked on a solo journey to Tehran and Mashhad, in the hope ultimately of reaching Merv. However, Nicholas de Giers of the Russian foreign ministry complained to the British government about Gill's presence near the Russian frontier and Gill was recalled to London. He returned home via Moscow, arriving on 1 April 1882.

=== Tripolitania and Cyrenaica ===
In 1881, Tunisia became a French territory. France's interest in North Africa led William Gill to seek detailed knowledge of the Ottoman-controlled provinces of Tripolitania and Cyrenaica (which now form Libya) between Tunis and Egypt. Gill arrived in Tripoli at the beginning of November 1881. After waiting three months for a travel permit that was never issued, he and his newly recruited Syrian Christian guide, Khalîl Attîk, explored the hinterland of Tripoli without one. Gill then intended to travel overland to Benghazi but this proved impossible, so he travelled there by steamer. He planned to go overland from Benghazi to Egypt but again could not obtain a travel permit. He, Khalîl Attîk and their camel-men secretly set off on the night of 21 April 1882 towards Egypt but were arrested by the Turkish authorities. Gill returned to England via Constantinople, where he was reprimanded by the British Ambassador for upsetting the Turks. He arrived in London on 16 June 1882, having returned by rail and ferry via Paris.

=== Egypt ===
When William Gill arrived back in London, Thomas George Baring, Earl of Northbrook and First Lord of the Admiralty, was gathering intelligence about the Bedouin tribes in the Sinai desert. An anti-European rebellion in Egypt was becoming increasingly likely and Baring's aim was to secure the Suez Canal by enlisting the support of the local sheikhs. The leading authority on the Bedouin was Professor Edward Henry Palmer of the University of Cambridge. On behalf of the Admiralty, Gill visited Palmer, who volunteered to travel through the desert from Gaza to Suez to gauge the mood of the Bedouin. On 11 July 1882, the British fleet bombarded Alexandria. Palmer set off from Jaffa the following day, on his way to Gaza and Suez.

Gill was sent to Egypt, arriving in Alexandria on 27 July 1882. He joined the intelligence department run by Admiral Hoskins at Port Said. On 5 August, Hoskins instructed Gill to cut the telegraph line that linked Cairo to Constantinople, thus preventing its use by the Egyptian nationalists. The section of line to be cut ran from the coast at Al Arish (90 miles east of Port Said) to Al Qantarah, where it crossed the Suez Canal. It needed to be sabotaged at a location where the neutrality of the Suez Canal was not breached and where the break could not easily be located and repaired by the nationalists.

Captain William Gill, Professor Edward Palmer and Lieutenant Harold Charrington of the Royal Navy (the flag-lieutenant of Admiral Sir William Hewett, the commander of the operation) set off from Suez before sunrise on 9 August. They were dressed as Arabs and were accompanied by Khalîl Attîk (the guide Gill had employed in North Africa), Bâkhor Hassûn (a secretly Jewish cook), Meter abu Sofieh (who falsely claimed to be a head sheikh and was employed by Palmer as a guide), Salameh ibn Ayed (the false sheikh's nephew) and various camel-men. The plan was that the party would split in the desert, with Palmer and Charrington heading east for Nakhl to buy camels and Gill travelling north to cut the telegraph line. Palmer had in his possession £3,000 in English sovereigns.

On 10 August, in Wadi Sudr, the party was attacked by a group of Bedouin and Meter abu Sofieh and his nephew escaped with the £3,000. On 11 August 1882, the Bedouin executed William Gill, Edward Palmer, Henry Charrington, Khalîl Attîk and Bâkhor Hassûn. The fragmentary remains of the bodies were found by Colonel Charles Warren's search party on 24 October 1882. They were interred in the crypt of St Paul's Cathedral, London, following a funeral service on 6 April 1883.

== Commemoration ==
Apart from a monument in the crypt of St Paul's, William Gill is commemorated by a stained glass window in Rochester Cathedral (which has close links with the Royal Engineers), by the Royal Geographical Society's Gill Memorial Award and by the Gill Scholarships at Brighton College. William Gill brought back to England samples of a number of plant species hitherto unknown in the west. Some of these were given Latin names honouring Gill. They include the evergreen oak Quercus gilliana.

== Family ==
William Gill never married and had no known children. He acted a bridge between his father, Major Robert Gill, who remained in India, and the rest of the family in England, including Robert's estranged wife (William's mother) Frances Gill. Robert Gill died in 1879, leaving two daughters by his second Indian mistress. These were Annie Gill (1864-1934) and Mildred Mary Gill (1866-1923). William Gill, a member and strong supporter of the Church of England, ensured that both his Anglo-Indian half-sisters were educated and well looked after at a Roman Catholic convent in Mumbai (Bombay). Both girls subsequently married Irish soldiers in the British army and ultimately moved to England.

William Gill was survived by his mother Frances Flowerdew Gill (1817-1887); his younger brother, the lawyer Robert Thomas Gill (1847-1927); his elder sister Frances Eliza Minchin Gill (1842-1930), who married James Francis Rea in 1891; and his younger sister Lucy Annie Gill (1849-1903) who married Willet Ram in 1874. William had another sister, Rose Matilda Gill, who was born in 1845 but died when less than three weeks old.
