= Shaun van Rooyen =

Australian-born New Zealand footballer

Personal information
- Full name: Shaun Stephen van Rooyen
- Date of birth: 27 April 1987 (age 39)
- Place of birth: Sydney, Australia
- Height: 6 ft 2 in (1.88 m)
- Position: Midfielder

Team information
- Current team: Wollongong Wolves

Senior career*
Years	Team	Apps	(Gls)
2009–2010	Waikato FC	13	(1)

International career
2008	New Zealand U-23	4	(0)
- * Club domestic league appearances and goals as of 30 April 2010

Shaun Stephen van Rooyen (born 27 April 1987) is a New Zealand football (soccer) who plays for New Zealand Football Championship side Waikato FC and has represented New Zealand at the Olympic Games.

Van Rooyen was included in the New Zealand squad for the football tournament at the Summer Olympics in Beijing where he played in two of New Zealand's group matches, against China (1-1) and Brazil (0-5).
