= Kenny Harlock =

New Zealand association football player (fl. 1997)

Personal information
- Full name: Kenneth Harlock
- Place of birth: New Zealand
- Position: Defender

Senior career*
Years	Team	Apps	(Gls)
- Waitakere City FC

International career
1997	New Zealand	1	(0)
- * Club domestic league appearances and goals

Kenneth Harlock is a former association football player who represented New Zealand at international level.

Harlock made a solitary official international appearance for New Zealand as a substitute in a 7–0 win over Papua New Guinea on 11 June 1997.

He attended High School at Waitākere College.
