= Robert Gill =

English painter

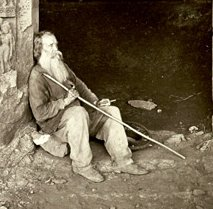
- Gill at Ajanta
- Born: 26 September 1804; Hackney, London, England
- Died: 10 April 1879 (aged 74) en route from Ajanta to Bhusawal, India.
- Resting place: European Cemetery, Bhusawal; 21°3′2.39″N 75°47′43.47″E
- Occupations: Army officer, artist, photographer, sportsman
- Known for: copying the paintings of Ajanta Caves.
- Spouse: Frances Flowerdew Rickerby
- Partner(s): Paro, a native girl of Ajanta

Major Robert Gill (1804–1879) was an army officer, antiquarian, painter and photographer in British India. He is best known for his paintings copying the frescoes of the Ajanta Caves. Gill was the first painter (Note: Upadhyay 1994, p. 1 notes that Fide Jesus, a native, had drawn and lithographed these paintings before Robert Gill (c. 1836) those were published in 1847.) – after their rediscovery in 1819 – to make extensive copies of the Buddhist cave paintings, which mostly date to the 5th century CE. His surviving copies and drawings remain significant in Ajanta studies as the originals have significantly deteriorated since his time.

== Biography ==
=== Family and military service ===
Gill was born in Hackney, London, the son of a stockbroker. He joined the 44th Madras Native Infantry as a cadet in 1824 and became an ensign on 6 May 1825. Promotion to Lieutenant followed in September 1826, and to Captain on 6 May 1840; finally he was promoted to Major. On 25 May 1841, he married Frances Flowerdew Rickerby at St Luke's Church, Chelsea, in London. He was discharged as an invalid on 1 October 1852. His first child, a daughter called Frances Eliza Minchin Gill (1842-1930), was born in Madras. His first son, the soldier, explorer and intelligence officer William John Gill (1843-1882), was born in Bangalore. A second daughter, Rose Matilda Gill, was born in Chelsea in 1845 but died when less than three weeks old. A second son, the lawyer Robert Thomas Gill (1847-1927) was born in Jaulnah, as was a third daughter, Lucy Annie Gill (1849-1903). Robert Gill may have had several children who died in infancy by his first Indian mistress, Paro. He had two daughters by his second Indian mistress: Mildred Mary Gill (1866-1923) and Annie Gill (c.1864-1934).

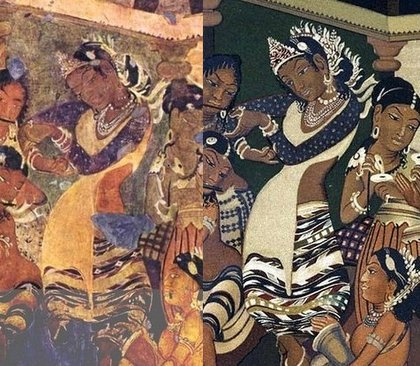
Dancing girl in Ajanta fresco, showing deterioration between the cave now (left) and Gill's copy.

=== Career ===
Gill was a member of The Royal Asiatic Society, and this association was eventually parlayed into copying the murals that had first been published in a lecture by James Fergusson to the Bombay branch of the Society, and later inclusion and illustration in his book in Indian rock-cut architecture. From 1844, Gill was taken away from military service to copy the Ajanta murals for the Asiatic Society of Bombay, at an additional salary of 200 rupees a year. He spent thirty years measuring, mapping, cataloguing, photographing, and painting in the caves, despite dangers from wild animals and the local Bhil people.

Arriving at Ajanta in early 1845, he completed an initial survey and inspection, submitting a report the same year. He began to ship completed paintings back to London in 1847, where many were exhibited at the museum of the East India Company. A number of them were reproduced, somewhat crudely, in an article in 1849 in the Illustrated London News. He had copied about 30 of the principal frescoes on canvas at almost full-size by 1863, when the painting phase of his work largely ended; these works were sent to London. Unfortunately, twenty-five of his pictures were burnt during the 1866 fire at The Crystal Palace, where they were on loan and being exhibited. Another was destroyed by a fire in a storeroom in the South Kensington Museum (now the Victoria and Albert Museum) in 1885. This was the same fire that destroyed most of the next generation of Ajanta copies, just completed by a team from the Bombay School of Art. None of Gill's lost copies had been photographed. The four surviving Gill copies are in the Victoria and Albert Museum in London; a number of his drawings are in the British Library.

Gill remained based at Ajanta for the rest of his life, also making tours to other ancient sites in India. He took up photography, including stereoscopy, in about 1856, and much of his photographic work is published in two books, The Rock-Cut Temples of India, and One Hundred Stereoscopic Illustrations of Architecture and Natural History in Western India, with notes by James Fergusson.

Gill's surviving photographs, drawings, and paintings are constantly cited by scholars of Ajanta and Indian art generally, as they have preserved the memories of original painted surfaces that have undergone significant flaking. Accelerated deterioration began immediately upon the caves' rediscovery starting in 1819. According to the Victoria and Albert Museum, even in Gill's time the original cave paintings could be seen suffering damage from frequent, unsupervised visitation and also from "swarms of bees and bats." Gill's works also record the condition of the stonework at the time; some sections have since been lost, such as the portico to Cave 1, and others considerably repaired and tidied. Many of his plans, drawings, and photographs are available online at the British Library and other places.

=== Death and burial ===
Like many other British Indian officers of those days, Gill was an avid hunter and killed about 150 tigers, mostly on foot. He died in 1879 while being transported from Ajanta to Bhusawal in a very ill condition, and was buried at the European Cemetery at Bhusawal.

== Modern interpretations ==
In 2012, a Marathi language film, Ajintha, was made based on his work and love story with a native girl Paro.

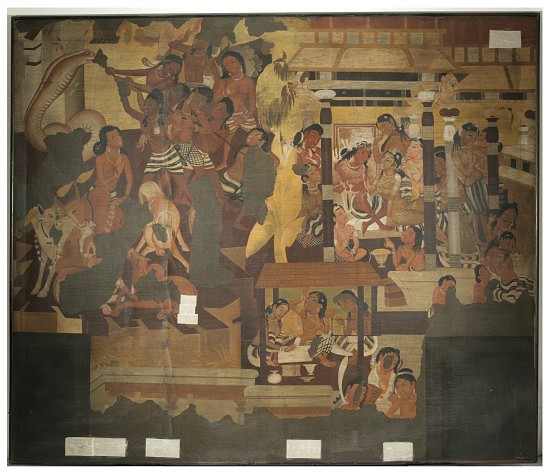
Copy of scene in Cave 1 by Gill, now Victoria and Albert Museum, 2.3 x 2.74 metres.

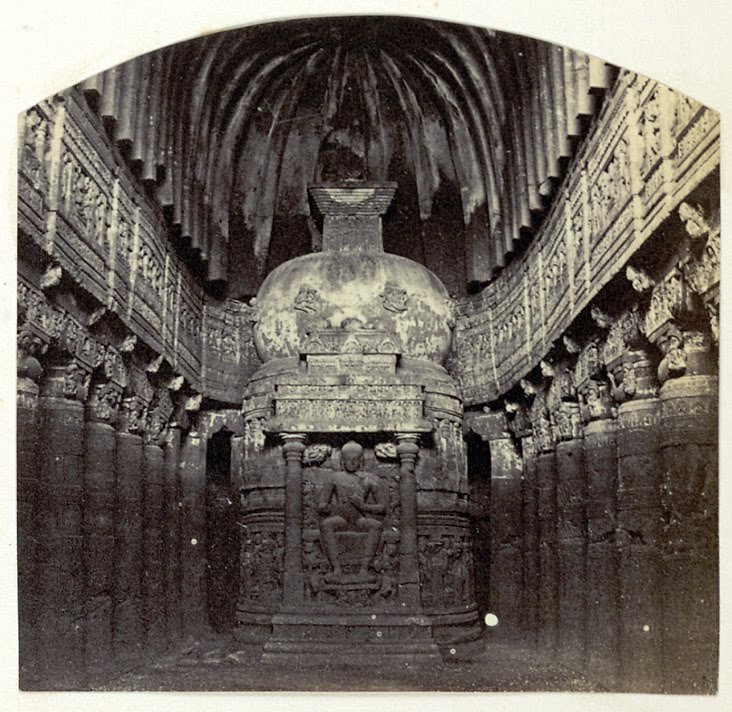
Photograph by Gill of the interior of Cave 26 at Ajanta from the Allardyce Collection

== Bibliography ==
=== Sources ===
- Buckland, Charles Edwards (1906). Dictionary of Indian Biography. Haskell House Publishers. p. 166.
- Gordon, Sophie (2011). Monumental visions: architectural photography in India, 1840–1901 (PhD thesis, PDF available) (Thesis). SOAS, University of London.
- Patel, Divia – Curator, Asian Department; Costaras, Nicola – Head Paintings Conservator (Spring 2006). "Conserving the copies of the Ajanta cave paintings at the V&A". Conservation Journal (52). Victoria & Albert Museum. Archived from the original on 18 October 2012.
- Upadhyay, Om Dutt (1994). The art of Ajanta and Sopoćani : a comparative study: an enquiry in prāṇa aesthetics. Delhi: Motilal Banarsidass Publisher. pp. 2–3. ISBN 9788120809901.
