= Thomas Edge (footballer) =

New Zealand footballer

Personal information
- Full name: Thomas A Edge
- Date of birth: 6 April 1970 (age 56)
- Place of birth: New Zealand
- Position: Midfielder

Senior career*
Years	Team	Apps	(Gls)
- Waitakere City

International career
1991–1995	New Zealand	7	(1)
- * Club domestic league appearances and goals

Thomas Edge (born 6 April 1970) is a former association football player who played as a midfielder. He represented the New Zealand national team at international level.

Edge made his full All Whites debut as a substitute in a 1–0 loss to Australia on 12 May 1991 and ended his international playing career with seven A-international caps to his credit, his final cap an appearance in a 3–0 loss to Australia on 15 November 1995.
