= William Mesny =

Jersey adventurer (1842–1919)

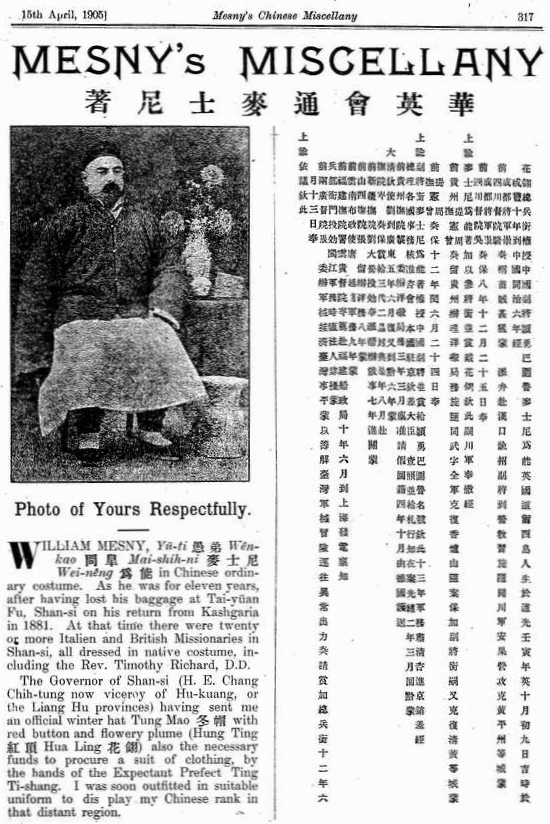
A page from Mesny's Miscellany, 1905. Photo: 1881

General William Mesny (1842 – 11 December 1919) was an adventurer and writer born on the island of Jersey but spent most of his childhood in Alderney, the family home of the Mesnys. He was the eldest of three children of William Mesny and Mary Rachel Nicolle.

== Biography ==
Mesny left home at the age of twelve to sail the oceans until finally, after visiting India and Australia, he settled in a turbulent China in 1860. He served with two of the provincial armies of the Qing dynasty imperial military as a mercenary or, in modern parlance, a foreign adviser.

He spent 59 years in China. He became a Major-General in the Imperial army in 1873 when he was only 30, suggesting that his services were greatly valued by the Chinese. He was also made a "Knight Ying of the Order of the Pa-tu-lu", the Chinese equivalent of the French Legion d'honneur. In 1890 he was awarded the decoration of the Pao Hsing (the Star of China).

He always retained British citizenship and was a Fellow of the Royal Geographical Society, the Royal Horticultural Society, and of the Imperial Institute. At one time he was the senior adviser to the Commander-in-Chief of the Chinese armed forces and was given the title of Brevet Lieutenant-General, Chinese Army.

He visited almost every part of China, including Sinkiang. He also visited Tonking (now northern Vietnam) and accompanied Captain William Gill on his expedition in 1877 from Chengdu to Burma via Litang, Batang, Dali, along the Tibetan borderlands to Bhamo. He was a plant collector and sent specimens back to the British Consul in Canton, Dr. Henry Fletcher Hance, a famous botanist. One species, Jasminum mesnyi, was named after him.

== Works ==
He wrote an informative history of "Tungking" – now northern Vietnam, which also includes details of the Black Flag Army, a pro-Chinese militia then fighting the French occupation.

In his later life he periodically produced a sort of weekly newspaper or journal in Shanghai called Mesny's Chinese Miscellany. Publication of Mesny's Chinese Miscellany began in September 1895, and continued through 1896, was revived briefly in 1899 and again in 1905. It was composed of his reminiscences of his life and adventures, snippets of recent news, and thousands of brief articles and notes on a very wide variety of topics relating to China. Mesny also strongly promoted railways and other methods of "modernizing" China.

- Mesny's Chinese Miscellany (1897)
- Mesny's Chinese Miscellany (1905)

== Memory ==
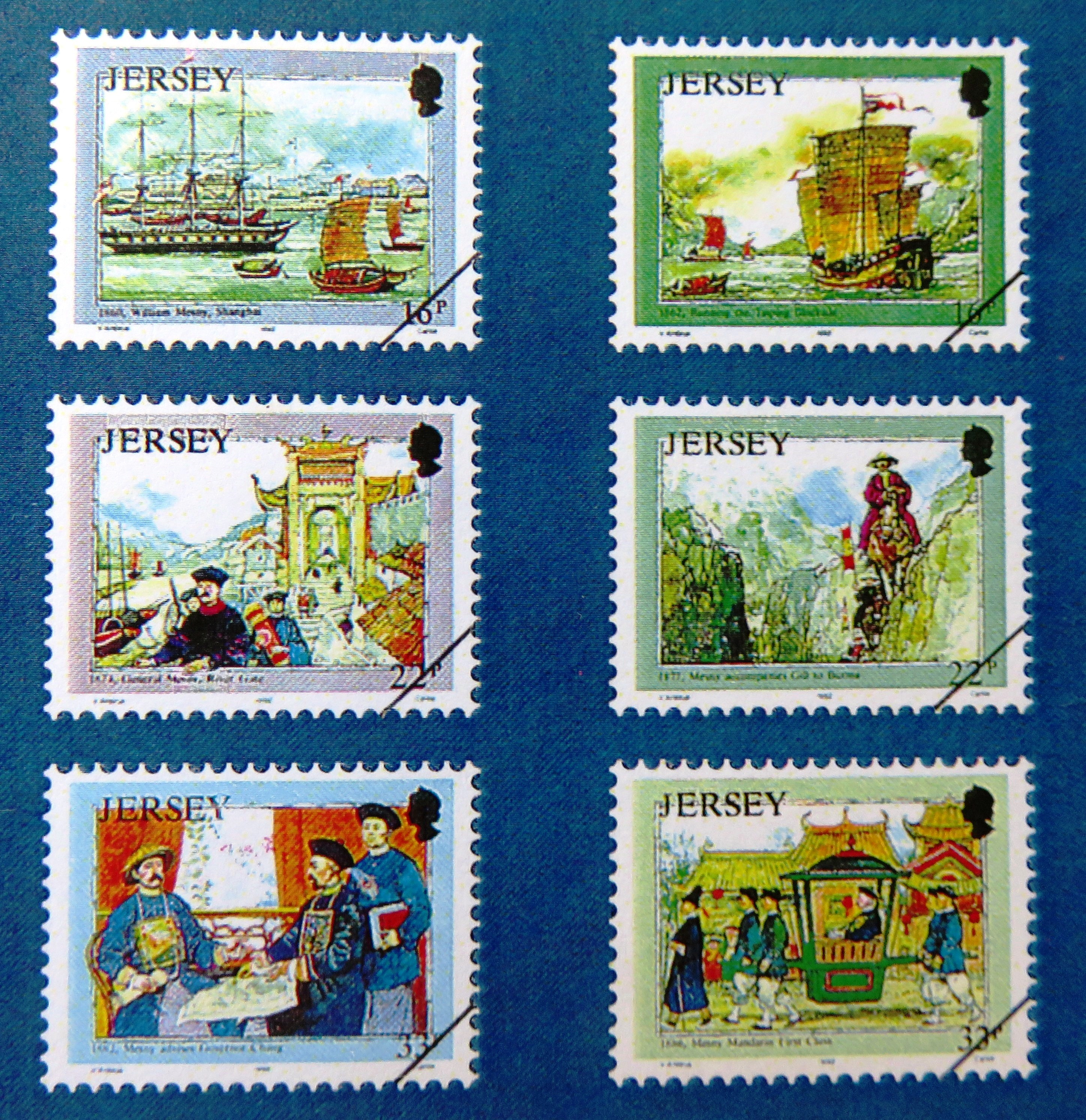
Jersey Stamps Commemorating the 150th anniversary of the birth of William Mesny.

A set of six stamps was issued in Jersey in 1992, on the 150th anniversary of his birth, showing Mesny in various roles in China. They comprise two stamps of 16p denomination: one showing him in 'Shanghai 1860', and the other 'Running the Taiping blockade 1862'; two stamps of 22p: as 'General Mesny, River Gate 1874', and 'Mesny accompanies William Gill to Burma in 1877'; and two of 32p: 'Mesny advises Governor Chang 1882', and 'Mesny, Mandarin First Class 1886'.
