= Cole Peverley =

New Zealand footballer (born 1988)

Personal information
- Full name: Cole Robert Peverley
- Date of birth: 3 July 1988 (age 38)
- Place of birth: Auckland, New Zealand
- Height: 1.81 m (5 ft 11 in)
- Position: Midfielder

Team information
- Current team: Auckland City
- Number: 8

Youth career
- Papatoetoe
- 2001–2004: Hansa Rostock

Senior career*
| Years | Team | Apps | (Gls) |
| 2004–2005 | Hansa Rostock | 0 | (0) |
| 2006 | Auckland City | 0 | (0) |
| 2007–2009 | Hawke's Bay United | 45 | (27) |
| 2009–2010 | Team Wellington | 15 | (19) |
| 2010–2011 | Hawke's Bay United | 14 | (17) |
| 2011 | Charleston Battery | 18 | (12) |
| 2011–2012 | Canterbury United | 9 | (10) |
| 2013–2017 | Team Wellington | 47 | (37) |
| 2018– | Auckland City | 1 | (0) |

International career^{‡}
| 2007 | New Zealand U-20 | 9 | (1) |
| 2008 | New Zealand U-23 | 8 | (9) |
| 2008 | New Zealand | 1 | (0) |
- * Club domestic league appearances and goals as of 9 April 2018 ‡ National team caps and goals as of 28 November 2018

Cole Robert Peverley (born 3 July 1988) is a New Zealand professional footballer who plays for Auckland City in the New Zealand Football Championship.

He has earned national representation honours at Under-20, Under-23 and All Whites level. Cole is reportedly signing for papamoa fc this season but is also in discussions with Tauranga city.

== Career ==
=== Club ===
Peverley signed a two-year contract for New Zealand Football Championship club Hawke's Bay United at the start of the 2007–08 season and made his début on 3 November 2007 against Canterbury United in a 3–1 win. Peverley went on to make 45 appearances for Hawke's Bay over two seasons and scored 5 goals

After two years with Hawke's Bay United, Peverley moved back to his hometown to play for NZFC club Team Wellington. Peverley made his début for Wellington in the first game of the 2009–10 season against YoungHeart Manawatu on 1 November 2009.

Peverley signed a one-year contract with Charleston Battery in the second division USL Pro on 16 February 2011.

=== International ===
Peverley was selected in the New Zealand U-20 squad at the 2007 FIFA U-20 World Cup finals tournament in Canada.

He was also included in the New Zealand U-23 squad for the 2008 OFC Men's Olympic Football Tournament where he featured in all 5 pool games and scored one goal against Fiji. He retained his spot in the team and was named in the final squad to travel to the 2008 Summer Olympics where he played in all three of New Zealand's group matches against China (1–1), Brazil (0–5) and Belgium (0–1).

Peverly made his full All Whites début in a 0–2 loss against Fiji on 19 November 2008 in a dead rubber 2010 FIFA World Cup Qualification/2008 OFC Nations Cup match. Peverley was named in a 15-man All Whites training squad for a 12-day camp for New Zealand and Australian based players prior to the 2010 FIFA World Cup. He was not initially named in the final 23 man squad to contest the World Cup, but was subsequently drafted in as injury cover for Tim Brown who fractured his shoulder in a warm up friendly against Australia.

== Honours ==
Team Wellington

- Charity Cup (1): 2014
- New Zealand Football Championship Champions (1): 2016
