= Ian Sandbrook =

New Zealand cricketer (born 1983)

Ian Patrick Sandbrook (born 22 March 1983 in Palmerston North) is a former New Zealand cricketer. He played first-class and List A cricket for Central Districts in 2007–08, and also played for Manawatu in the Hawke Cup from 2002 to 2010.
