= Daniel Ellensohn =

New Zealand footballer (born 1985)

Personal information
- Full name: Daniel Ellensohn
- Date of birth: 9 August 1985 (age 41)
- Place of birth: Cape Town, South Africa
- Height: 1.85 m (6 ft 1 in)
- Position: Striker

Team information
- Current team: Macarthur Rams
- Number: 8

Youth career
- 2001–2003: FC Viktorsberg

Senior career*
Years	Team	Apps	(Gls)
2004–2006	Waitakere United	6	(2)
2006–2008	Team Wellington	13	(6)
2008	Waitakere United	2	(1)
2009	FC Lustenau 07	2	(0)
2009	FC Koblach		
2010	Macarthur Rams		
2011–	Kiwi FC	8	(9)

International career^{‡}
2007	New Zealand U-23	15	(5)
2007–	New Zealand	1	(0)
- * Club domestic league appearances and goals as of 15 March 2012 ‡ National team caps and goals as of 23 June 2008

Daniel Ellensohn (born 9 August 1985 in Cape Town) is an association football striker from New Zealand who has played in New Zealand, Australia and Austria. He has represented NZ in beach soccer & Austria in touch Rugby. He has also been known to DJ, with popular London clubs Gigalum and Ministry of Sound hosting him.

== Club career ==
His previous teams include Team Wellington and Waitakere United. Ellensohn holds dual citizenship with Austria and New Zealand. The South African-born striker played from 2004 to 2008 in the New Zealand Football Championship, initially for three seasons at Waitakere United, with whom he twice reached the 2005 and 2007 Grand Final, but lost both went to Auckland City. In 2007, he moved to Wellington team again in 2008 and reached the Grand Final, this time against his former club Waitakere. In spite of his hits for the 1:0-lead his team lost the game even with 2:3. Ellensohn then became the first ever New Zealander to sign in Austria as he signed for FC Lustenau in the Erste Liga, where his contract was no longer extended due to injury.
For the 2008/09 season Ellensohn returned to Waitakere and participated with the team at the FIFA Club World Cup 2008 (however, came at the 1:2 defeat against Adelaide United). Ellensohn has also spent a season with Sydney's Macarthur Rams in the NSW State League. In 2011-12 he signed with Kiwi FC, in London, UK.

In 2001 North Shore United won the northern league where Ellensohn played as a 15 year old, and went on to win the National League playoffs
Ellensohn won the Chatham Cup with University Mt Wellington in 2003 vs Melville - the same year he was named Northern Football young player of the year.

== International career ==
Ellensohn has made a solitary appearance for the New Zealand All Whites as a substitute in the 2010 FIFA World Cup qualifier against Vanuatu on 17 November 2007. He was included in the New Zealand squad for the football tournament at the Summer Olympics in Beijing, where they competed against hosts China, Brazil and Belgium. Ellensohn scored the only goal in New Zealand U-23 historic 1–0 win over Chile, in Wellington, New Zealand on 4 July 2008, which tied the series 1-1. http://www.kiwifc.com/#/squad/4554518247

He has represented New Zealand's national beach soccer team, where he was named captain during the 2007 OFC Beach World Cup Qualifiers. New Zealand's first and only Beach Soccer team.

Ellensohn also represented Austria in touch rugby at the 2013 Mainland Cup in Vienna, when he was voted the MVP in Austrias mixed squad for the tournament. Photos

== Personal ==
His brother David Ellensohn has represented New Zealand at Secondary School level as a goalkeeper and the South African born New Zealander holds an Austrian passport.
