= Sam Messam =

New Zealand footballer

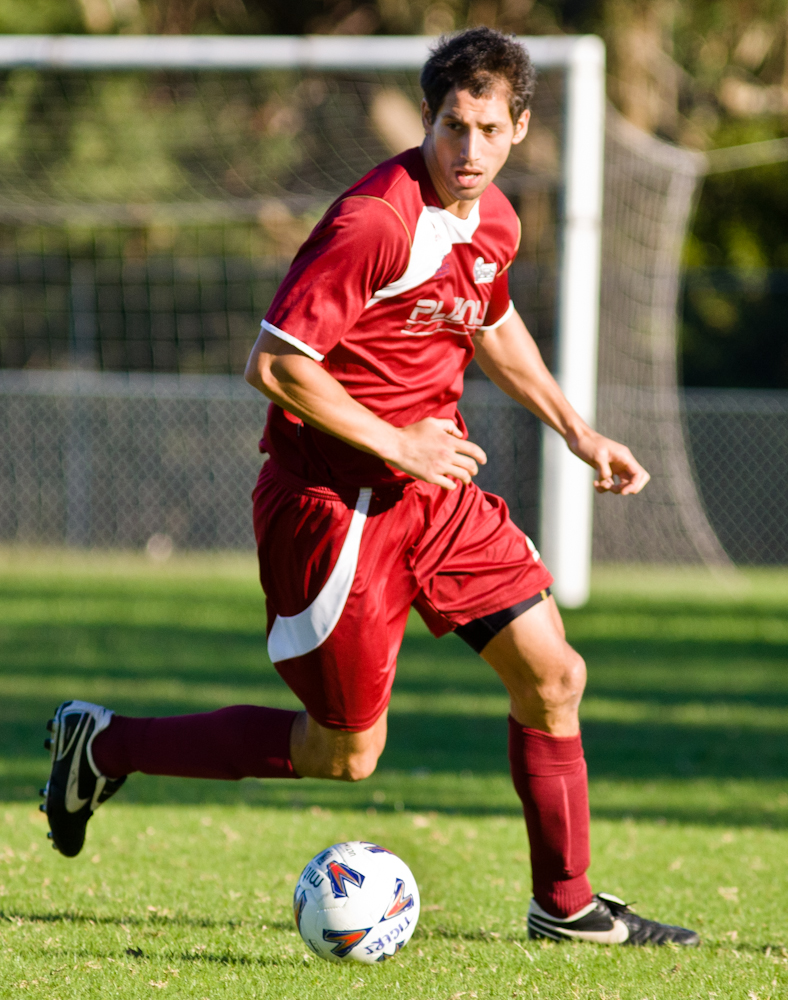

Personal information
- Full name: Samuel Messam
- Date of birth: 2 March 1986 (age 40)
- Place of birth: New Zealand
- Position: Striker

Team information
- Current team: Kincumber Roos
- Number: 15

Senior career*
Years	Team	Apps	(Gls)
2006–2008	Hawke's Bay United		
2010	Macarthur Rams Football Club		
2011	APIA Leichhardt Tigers		
2012–2024	St. George Saints Football Club		

International career
2008	New Zealand U-23	4	(0)
- * Club domestic league appearances and goals

Samuel Messam (born 2 March 1986) is a New Zealand Association football player who plays for St. George Saints Football Club and has represented New Zealand at the Olympic Games.

Messam was included in the New Zealand squad for the football tournament at the Summer Olympics in Beijing where he played in just one of New Zealand's group matches, a 0–1 loss Belgium.

Messam was signed by New South Wales Premier League Club APIA Leichhardt for the 2011 season.

He is an old boy of Rotorua Boys' High School.
