= 1999 CAF Champions League group stage =

Football tournament stage

The group stage of the 1999 CAF Champions League was played from 21 August to 7 November 1999. A total of eight teams competed in the group stage.

== Format ==
In the group stage, each group was played on a home-and-away round-robin basis. The winners of each group advanced directly to the final.

== Groups ==
The matchdays were 21–22 August, 3–5 September, 18–19 September, 9–10 October, 21–24 October, and 6–7 November 1999.

Key to colours in group tables
Group winners advance to the final

=== Group A ===
Pos	Team	Pld	W	D	L	GF	GA	GD	Pts	Qualification
1	(Morocco) Raja Casablanca	6	3	2	1	4	2	+2	11	Final
2	(Egypt) Al Ahly	6	3	1	2	11	7	+4	10	
3	(Ghana) Hearts of Oak	6	2	2	2	7	6	+1	8	
4	(Nigeria) Shooting Stars	6	1	1	4	6	13	−7	4	

21 August 1999

Shooting Stars (Nigeria)	2–3	(Egypt) Al Ahly

Lekan Salami Stadium, Ibadan
22 August 1999

Raja Casablanca (Morocco)	1–0	(Ghana) Hearts of Oak

Stade Mohammed V, Casablanca

3 September 1999

Al Ahly (Egypt)	0–1	(Morocco) Raja Casablanca

Cairo International Stadium, Cairo
4 September 1999

Hearts of Oak (Ghana)	3–0	(Nigeria) Shooting Stars

Accra Sports Stadium, Accra

18 September 1999

Raja Casablanca (Morocco)	1–0	(Nigeria) Shooting Stars

Stade Mohammed V, Casablanca
19 September 1999

Hearts of Oak (Ghana)	2–1	(Egypt) Al Ahly

Accra Sports Stadium, Accra

9 October 1999

Shooting Stars (Nigeria)	1–0	(Morocco) Raja Casablanca

Lekan Salami Stadium, Ibadan
10 October 1999

Al Ahly (Egypt)	2–0	(Ghana) Hearts of Oak

Cairo International Stadium, Cairo

21 October 1999

Al Ahly (Egypt)	4–1	(Nigeria) Shooting Stars

Cairo International Stadium, Cairo
23 October 1999

Hearts of Oak (Ghana)	0–0	(Morocco) Raja Casablanca

Accra Sports Stadium, Accra

7 November 1999

Shooting Stars (Nigeria)	2–2	(Ghana) Hearts of Oak

Lekan Salami Stadium, Ibadan
7 November 1999

Raja Casablanca (Morocco)	1–1	(Egypt) Al Ahly

Stade Mohammed V, Casablanca

=== Group B ===
Pos	Team	Pld	W	D	L	GF	GA	GD	Pts	Qualification
1	(Tunisia) ES Tunis	6	5	0	1	13	1	+12	15	Final
2	(Ivory Coast) ASEC Mimosas	6	3	1	2	7	6	+1	10	
3	(Zimbabwe) Dynamos Harare	6	2	0	4	9	9	0	6	
4	(Réunion) SS Saint-Louisienne	6	1	1	4	4	17	−13	4	

21 August 1999

ES Tunis (Tunisia)	3–0	(Ivory Coast) ASEC Mimosas

Stade El Menzah, Tunis
21 August 1999

SS Saint-Louisienne (Réunion)	1–0	(Zimbabwe) Dynamos Harare

Stade Théophile Hoarau, Saint-Louis

5 September 1999

Dynamos Harare (Zimbabwe)	0–2	(Tunisia) ES Tunis

Rufaro Stadium, Harare
5 September 1999

ASEC Mimosas (Ivory Coast)	3–1	(Réunion) SS Saint-Louisienne

Stade Félix Houphouët-Boigny, Abidjan

18 September 1999

ASEC Mimosas (Ivory Coast)	2–0	(Zimbabwe) Dynamos Harare

Stade Félix Houphouët-Boigny, Abidjan
19 September 1999

ES Tunis (Tunisia)	5–0	(Réunion) SS Saint-Louisienne

Stade El Menzah, Tunis

10 October 1999

SS Saint-Louisienne (Réunion)	0–2	(Tunisia) ES Tunis

Stade Théophile Hoarau, Saint-Louis
10 October 1999

Dynamos Harare (Zimbabwe)	2–1	(Ivory Coast) ASEC Mimosas

Rufaro Stadium, Harare

24 October 1999

ASEC Mimosas (Ivory Coast)	1–0	(Tunisia) ES Tunis

Stade Félix Houphouët-Boigny, Abidjan
24 October 1999

Dynamos Harare (Zimbabwe)	7–2	(Réunion) SS Saint-Louisienne

Rufaro Stadium, Harare

6 November 1999

ES Tunis (Tunisia)	1–0	(Zimbabwe) Dynamos Harare

Stade El Menzah, Tunis
6 November 1999

SS Saint-Louisienne (Réunion)	0–0	(Ivory Coast) ASEC Mimosas

Stade Théophile Hoarau, Saint-Louis
