= 2016 OFC Champions League =

Tournament details
- Host countries: Preliminary stage: Cook Islands; Final stage: New Zealand
- Dates: Preliminary stage: 26–30 January 2016; Final stage: 8–23 April 2016
- Teams: Final stage: 12; Total: 15 (from 11 associations)

Final positions
- Champions: (New Zealand) Auckland City (8th title)
- Runners-up: (New Zealand) Team Wellington

Tournament statistics
- Matches played: 27
- Goals scored: 131 (4.85 per match)
- Attendance: 7,170 (266 per match)
- Top scorer(s): Preliminary stage: (New Zealand) Jared Colligan; Final stage: (Portugal) João Moreira (5 goals each)
- Best player: (Solomon Islands) Micah Lea'alafa
- Best goalkeeper: (New Zealand) Scott Basalaj
- Fair play award: (Papua New Guinea) Hekari United

The 2016 OFC Champions League was the 15th edition of the Oceanian Club Championship, Oceania's premier club football tournament organized by the Oceania Football Confederation (OFC), and the 10th season under the current OFC Champions League name. The final stage of the tournament was held in New Zealand for the first time under its current format, with the preliminary stage held in the Cook Islands.

Auckland City were the five-time defending champions, and won their sixth title in a row and eighth overall title with a 3–0 final victory over fellow New Zealand opponents Team Wellington. As the winners of the 2016 OFC Champions League, they qualified as the OFC representative at the 2016 FIFA Club World Cup in Japan (a record eighth Club World Cup appearance). Their sixth consecutive continental club title was also a record, surpassing a tie they previously shared with Real Madrid, who won five consecutive European Cups between 1956 and 1960.

== Teams ==
Location of teams of the 2016 OFC Champions League.
Teams entering the group stage; (H) Group stage host
Teams entering the preliminary stage; (h) Preliminary stage host

A total of 15 teams from all 11 OFC member associations entered the competition.

- The four associations with the best results in the 2014–15 OFC Champions League (Fiji, New Caledonia, New Zealand, Papua New Guinea) were awarded two berths each in the group stage.
- Three other associations (Solomon Islands, Tahiti, Vanuatu) were awarded one berth each in the group stage.
- The four developing associations (American Samoa, Cook Islands, Samoa, Tonga) were awarded one berth each in the preliminary stage, with the winner advancing to the group stage.

Association	Team	Qualifying method
Teams entering the group stage
Fiji	Nadi	2015 Fiji National Football League champion
Fiji	Suva	2015 Fiji National Football League runner-up
(New Caledonia) New Caledonia	Magenta	2014 New Caledonia Super Ligue champion
(New Caledonia) New Caledonia	Lössi	2014 New Caledonia Super Ligue runner-up
(New Zealand) New Zealand	Auckland City	2014–15 New Zealand Football Championship grand final champion 2014–15 New Zealand Football Championship regular season premier
(New Zealand) New Zealand	Team Wellington	2014–15 New Zealand Football Championship regular season runner-up
(Papua New Guinea) Papua New Guinea	Hekari United	2015 Papua New Guinea National Soccer League first stage winner
(Papua New Guinea) Papua New Guinea	Lae City Dwellers	2015 Papua New Guinea National Soccer League first stage runner-up
(Solomon Islands) Solomon Islands	Solomon Warriors	2015–16 Solomon Islands S-League regular season winner
(French Polynesia) Tahiti	Tefana	2014–15 Tahiti Ligue 1 champion
Vanuatu	Amicale	2015 VFF National Super League champion
Teams entering the preliminary stage
(American Samoa) American Samoa	Utulei Youth	2014 FFAS Senior League champion
(Cook Islands) Cook Islands	Tupapa Maraerenga	2015 Cook Islands Round Cup champion
Samoa	Kiwi	2013–14 Samoa National League champion
Tonga	Veitongo	2015 Tonga Major League champion

== Schedule ==
The schedule of the competition was as follows.

Stage	Host country	Venues	Round	Dates
Preliminary stage	Cook Islands	CIFA Academy Field, Matavera	Round 1	26 January 2016
Preliminary stage	Cook Islands	CIFA Academy Field, Matavera	Round 2	28 January 2016
Preliminary stage	Cook Islands	CIFA Academy Field, Matavera	Round 3	30 January 2016
Final stage (Group stage & Knockout stage)	New Zealand	QBE Stadium (Main Field & Oval), Auckland	Round 1	8–10 April 2016
Final stage (Group stage & Knockout stage)	New Zealand	QBE Stadium (Main Field & Oval), Auckland	Round 2	11–13 April 2016
Final stage (Group stage & Knockout stage)	New Zealand	QBE Stadium (Main Field & Oval), Auckland	Round 3	15–17 April 2016
Final stage (Group stage & Knockout stage)	New Zealand	QBE Stadium (Main Field & Oval), Auckland	Semi-finals	20 April 2016
Final stage (Group stage & Knockout stage)	New Zealand	QBE Stadium (Main Field & Oval), Auckland	Final	23 April 2016

== Preliminary stage ==
The preliminary stage was played in Matavera, Cook Islands from 26 to 30 January 2016. The draw for the fixtures was held on 16 November 2015, 15:00 NZDT (UTC+13) at the OFC Headquarters in Auckland, New Zealand. The four teams played each other on a round-robin basis. The winner advanced to the group stage to join the 11 direct entrants.

All times UTC−10.

Pos	Team	Pld	W	D	L	GF	GA	GD	Pts	Qualification
1	(Samoa) Kiwi	3	3	0	0	15	4	+11	9	Group stage
2	(Cook Islands) Tupapa Maraerenga (H)	3	2	0	1	17	3	+14	6	
3	(American Samoa) Utulei Youth	3	1	0	2	6	17	−11	3	
4	(Tonga) Veitongo	3	0	0	3	3	17	−14	0	

Source: OFC
(H) Hosts
26 January 2016
14:30

Utulei Youth (American Samoa)	2–6	(Samoa) Kiwi
Collins 8'; Tomasi 75'	Report	Saofaiga 32'; Mosquera 34' (pen.), 90+1'; Samuelu 39' (o.g.); Packer 75', 77'

CIFA Academy Field, Matavera
Attendance: 120
Referee: Anna-Marie Keighley (New Zealand)
26 January 2016
17:00

Veitongo (Tonga)	0–7	(Cook Islands) Tupapa Maraerenga
	Report	Colligan 7' (pen.), 12' (pen.), 41', 59'; Simiona 30', 70'; Tiro 90'

CIFA Academy Field, Matavera
Attendance: 200
Referee: Averii Jacques (Tahiti)

28 January 2016
14:30

Utulei Youth (American Samoa)	3–2	(Tonga) Veitongo
Kang 13'; Samuelu 34'; Siligi 84'	Report	Polovili 39'; Uele 73' (pen.)

CIFA Academy Field, Matavera
Attendance: 100
Referee: Robinson Banga (Vanuatu)
28 January 2016
17:00

Tupapa Maraerenga (Cook Islands)	1–2	(Samoa) Kiwi
Simiona 75'	Report	Saofaiga 37'; Mosquera 65'

CIFA Academy Field, Matavera
Attendance: 200
Referee: Nelson Sogo (Solomon Islands)

30 January 2016
14:30

Tupapa Maraerenga (Cook Islands)	9–1	(American Samoa) Utulei Youth
Colligan 15'; Ruka 29'; Best 44', 57', 59'; Karika 74', 88', 90+6'; Harmon 89'	Report	Siligi 61'

CIFA Academy Field, Matavera
Attendance: 150
Referee: Averii Jacques (Tahiti)
30 January 2016
17:00

Kiwi (Samoa)	7–1	(Tonga) Veitongo
Mason 25', 68', 90+5'; Blackburn 30', 64', 90'; Sutcliffe 47'	Report	Polovili 23'

CIFA Academy Field, Matavera
Attendance: 200
Referee: Anna-Marie Keighley (New Zealand)

== Group stage ==
The group stage was played in Auckland, New Zealand from 8 to 17 April 2016. The draw for the group stage was held on 16 November 2015, 15:00 NZDT (UTC+13) at the OFC Headquarters in Auckland, New Zealand. The 12 teams were drawn into three groups of four, with each group containing one team from each of the four pots. The allocation of teams into pots was based on the results of their associations in the previous edition of the OFC Champions League. Teams from the same association could not be drawn into the same group.

Pot 1	Pot 2	Pot 3	Pot 4
1. (New Zealand) Auckland City; 2. (New Zealand) Team Wellington; 3. (Fiji) Nadi	4. (New Caledonia) Magenta; 5. (Papua New Guinea) Hekari United; 6. (Vanuatu) Amicale	7. (Fiji) Suva; 8. (French Polynesia) Tefana; 9. (Solomon Islands) Solomon Warriors	10. (New Caledonia) Lössi; 11. (Papua New Guinea) Lae City Dwellers; 12. (Samoa) Kiwi (Preliminary winner)

In each group, the four teams played each other on a round-robin basis. The group winners and the best runner-up advanced to the semi-finals.

All times UTC+12.

=== Group A ===
Pos	Team	Pld	W	D	L	GF	GA	GD	Pts	Qualification
1	(New Zealand) Auckland City (H)	3	3	0	0	9	2	+7	9	Knockout stage
2	(Vanuatu) Amicale	3	2	0	1	7	3	+4	6	
3	(Solomon Islands) Solomon Warriors	3	1	0	2	5	11	−6	3	
4	(Papua New Guinea) Lae City Dwellers	3	0	0	3	5	10	−5	0	

Source: OFC
(H) Hosts
10 April 2016
13:00

Auckland City (New Zealand)	4–0	(Solomon Islands) Solomon Warriors
Kim 54'; Moreira 73', 85', 90+1'	Report

QBE Stadium, Auckland
Attendance: 250
Referee: Salesh Chand (Fiji)
10 April 2016
15:30

Lae City Dwellers (Papua New Guinea)	0–3	(Vanuatu) Amicale
	Report	Dickinson 28', 37'; Nadaya 81'

QBE Stadium, Auckland
Attendance: 650
Referee: Averii Jacques (Tahiti)

13 April 2016
13:00

Amicale (Vanuatu)	3–0 Awarded	(Solomon Islands) Solomon Warriors
Bertacchi 90+3'	Report	Ifunaoa 53'

QBE Stadium (Oval), Auckland
Attendance: 100
Referee: Salesh Chand (Fiji)

The match originally ended 1–1. However, Solomon Warriors were later ruled to have forfeited the match for fielding an ineligible player.

13 April 2016
15:30

Lae City Dwellers (Papua New Guinea)	1–2	(New Zealand) Auckland City
Gunemba 86'	Report	Kim 65'; Moreira 89'

QBE Stadium (Oval), Auckland
Attendance: 300
Referee: Médéric Lacour (New Caledonia)

The kick-off of Group A matches on matchday 9 were delayed due to heavy rain.

17 April 2016
13:40

Solomon Warriors (Solomon Islands)	5–4	(Papua New Guinea) Lae City Dwellers
Kaltack 7'; Nelson 44' (o.g.); Donga 59', 87'; Tigi 78'	Report	Gunemba 3'; Fakari 35' (o.g.); Dabinyaba 66'; Foster 76' (pen.)

QBE Stadium, Auckland
Attendance: 200
Referee: Médéric Lacour (New Caledonia)
17 April 2016
16:20

Auckland City (New Zealand)	3–1	(Vanuatu) Amicale
White 71'; De Vries 90'; Moreira 90+6'	Report	Dickinson 24'

QBE Stadium, Auckland
Attendance: 450
Referee: Averii Jacques (Tahiti)

=== Group B ===
Pos	Team	Pld	W	D	L	GF	GA	GD	Pts	Qualification
1	(New Zealand) Team Wellington	3	3	0	0	8	1	+7	9	Knockout stage
2	(Papua New Guinea) Hekari United	3	2	0	1	8	5	+3	6	
3	(Fiji) Suva	3	1	0	2	3	6	−3	3	
4	(New Caledonia) Lössi	3	0	0	3	3	10	−7	0	

Source: OFC
9 April 2016
13:00

Team Wellington (New Zealand)	2–0	(Fiji) Suva
Harris 73', 80'	Report

QBE Stadium, Auckland
Attendance: 150
Referee: Joel Hopkken (Vanuatu)
9 April 2016
15:30

Lössi (New Caledonia)	1–5	(Papua New Guinea) Hekari United
D. Kauma 30'	Report	Nawo 2'; Semmy 9'; Wama 38'; Feni 54'; Simon 72'

QBE Stadium, Auckland
Attendance: 350
Referee: Nelson Sogo (Solomon Islands)

12 April 2016
13:00

Hekari United (Papua New Guinea)	3–0	(Fiji) Suva
Feni 16'; Semmy 31'; Nawo 77'	Report

QBE Stadium (Oval), Auckland
Attendance: 100
Referee: Robinson Banga (Vanuatu)
12 April 2016
15:30

Lössi (New Caledonia)	1–2	(New Zealand) Team Wellington
Ouka 42'	Report	Jackson 48'; Barcia 64'

QBE Stadium (Oval), Auckland
Attendance: 250
Referee: Averii Jacques (Tahiti)

16 April 2016
13:00

Suva (Fiji)	3–1	(New Caledonia) Lössi
Wahnyamalla 10' (o.g.); Hughes 19'; Matarerega 47'	Report	Ouka 67'

QBE Stadium, Auckland
Attendance: 100
Referee: Nelson Sogo (Solomon Islands)
16 April 2016
15:30

Team Wellington (New Zealand)	4–0	(Papua New Guinea) Hekari United
Robertson 21', 37'; Bolatoga 55' (o.g.); Corrales 63'	Report

QBE Stadium, Auckland
Attendance: 200
Referee: Salesh Chand (Fiji)

=== Group C ===
Pos	Team	Pld	W	D	L	GF	GA	GD	Pts	Qualification
1	(New Caledonia) Magenta	3	3	0	0	9	2	+7	9	Knockout stage
2	(French Polynesia) Tefana	3	2	0	1	15	5	+10	6	Knockout stage
3	(Fiji) Nadi	3	1	0	2	5	12	−7	3	
4	(Samoa) Kiwi	3	0	0	3	3	13	−10	0	

Source: OFC
8 April 2016
13:00

Nadi (Fiji)	1–6	(French Polynesia) Tefana
Roche 62' (o.g.)	Report	Tinorua 21'; Atani 30'; Keck 48', 56'; Tevaerai 66'; Lucas 78'

QBE Stadium, Auckland
Attendance: 150
Referee: Campbell-Kirk Waugh (New Zealand)
8 April 2016
15:30

Kiwi (Samoa)	0–2	(New Caledonia) Magenta
	Report	Aucher 24'; Nicholls 70'

QBE Stadium, Auckland
Attendance: 150
Referee: Amos Anio (Papua New Guinea)

11 April 2016
13:00

Magenta (New Caledonia)	4–2	(French Polynesia) Tefana
J. Wajoka 5'; Bearune 25', 27' (pen.), 86' (pen.)	Report	Tevaerai 18'; Tiatia 47'

QBE Stadium (Oval), Auckland
Attendance: 200
Referee: Campbell-Kirk Waugh (New Zealand)
11 April 2016
15:30

Kiwi (Samoa)	3–4	(Fiji) Nadi
Saofaiga 2', 21'; Scanlan 10'	Report	Khem 8', 87', 90+6', 90+8'

QBE Stadium (Oval), Auckland
Attendance: 300
Referee: George Time (Solomon Islands)

15 April 2016
13:00

Tefana (French Polynesia)	7–0	(Samoa) Kiwi
A. Tehau 31', 45'; Tiatia 41'; Tinorua 52'; Atani 60'; Chong Hue 63'; Lucas 68'	Report

QBE Stadium, Auckland
Attendance: 100
Referee: Amos Anio (Papua New Guinea)
15 April 2016
15:30

Nadi (Fiji)	0–3	(New Caledonia) Magenta
	Report	Jelewed 21'; Nicholls 39'; Dokunengo 57'

QBE Stadium, Auckland
Attendance: 100
Referee: Joel Hopkken (Vanuatu)

=== Ranking of second-placed teams ===
Pos	Grp	Team	Pld	W	D	L	GF	GA	GD	Pts	Qualification
1	C	(French Polynesia) Tefana	3	2	0	1	15	5	+10	6	Knockout stage
2	A	(Vanuatu) Amicale	3	2	0	1	7	3	+4	6	
3	B	(Papua New Guinea) Hekari United	3	2	0	1	8	5	+3	6	

Source: OFC

== Knockout stage ==
The knockout stage was played in Auckland, New Zealand from 20 to 23 April 2016. The four teams played on a single-elimination basis. The semi-final matchups were:

- Winner Group A vs. Best runner-up
- Winner Group B vs. Winner Group C

All times UTC+12.

=== Bracket ===
Semi-finals
20 April
(New Zealand) Auckland City	4
(French Polynesia) Tefana	2
20 April
(New Zealand) Team Wellington	2
(New Caledonia) Magenta	0

Final
23 April
(New Zealand) Auckland City	3
(New Zealand) Team Wellington	0

=== Semi-finals ===
20 April 2016
12:00

Auckland City (New Zealand)	4–2	(French Polynesia) Tefana
Lea'alafa 7', 23'; Lewis 25', 44'	Report	Keck 10'; Tinorua 86' (pen.)

QBE Stadium, Auckland
Attendance: 400
Referee: Salesh Chand (Fiji)

20 April 2016
15:30

Team Wellington (New Zealand)	2–0	(New Caledonia) Magenta
Jackson 74' (pen.), 77'	Report

QBE Stadium, Auckland
Attendance: 200
Referee: Kader Zitouni (Tahiti)

=== Final ===
23 April 2016
14:00

Auckland City (New Zealand)	3–0	(New Zealand) Team Wellington
Lea'alafa 2', 84'; Lewis 67'	Report

QBE Stadium, Auckland
Attendance: 1,500
Referee: Averii Jacques (Tahiti)

== Statistics ==
=== Tournament statistics ===
Stage	Matches	Goals	Avg. goals	Attendance	Avg. attendance
Preliminary stage	6	41	6.83	970	162
Final stage (Group stage & Knockout stage)	21	90	4.29	6200	295

=== Top goalscorers ===
Preliminary stage
Rank	Player	Team	Goals
1	(New Zealand) Jared Colligan	(Cook Islands) Tupapa Maraerenga	5
2	(Cook Islands) Campbell Best	(Cook Islands) Tupapa Maraerenga	3
2	(New Zealand) Sam Blackburn	(Samoa) Kiwi	3
2	(Cook Islands) Josh Karika	(Cook Islands) Tupapa Maraerenga	3
2	(New Zealand) Jamie Mason	(Samoa) Kiwi	3
2	(New Zealand) Tomas Mosquera	(Samoa) Kiwi	3
2	(Cook Islands) Harlem Simiona	(Cook Islands) Tupapa Maraerenga	3
8	(England) Martin Packer	(Samoa) Kiwi	2
8	(Tonga) Hemaloto Polovili	(Tonga) Veitongo	2
8	(Samoa) Mike Saofaiga	(Samoa) Kiwi	2
8	(American Samoa) Kaleopa Siligi	(American Samoa) Utulei Youth	2

Final stage
Rank	Player	Team	Goals
1	(Portugal) João Moreira	(New Zealand) Auckland City	5
2	(Fiji) Anish Khem	(Fiji) Nadi	4
2	(Solomon Islands) Micah Lea'alafa	(New Zealand) Auckland City	4
4	(New Caledonia) Georges Bearune	(New Caledonia) Magenta	3
4	(England) Adam Dickinson	(Vanuatu) Amicale	3
4	(New Zealand) Tom Jackson	(New Zealand) Team Wellington	3
4	(French Polynesia) Tauhiti Keck	(French Polynesia) Tefana	3
4	(New Zealand) Clayton Lewis	(New Zealand) Auckland City	3
4	(French Polynesia) Temarii Tinorua	(French Polynesia) Tefana	3
10	(French Polynesia) Stanley Atani	(French Polynesia) Tefana	2
10	(Solomon Islands) Jerry Donga	(Solomon Islands) Solomon Warriors	2
10	(Solomon Islands) Gagame Feni	(Papua New Guinea) Hekari United	2
10	(Papua New Guinea) Raymond Gunemba	(Papua New Guinea) Lae City Dwellers	2
10	(England) Ben Harris	(New Zealand) Team Wellington	2
10	(South Korea) Kim Dae-wook	(New Zealand) Auckland City	2
10	(French Polynesia) Tauatua Lucas	(French Polynesia) Tefana	2
10	(Solomon Islands) Joses Nawo	(Papua New Guinea) Hekari United	2
10	(Vanuatu) Bill Nicholls	(New Caledonia) Magenta	2
10	(New Caledonia) Jim Ouka	(New Caledonia) Lössi	2
10	(England) Bill Robertson	(New Zealand) Team Wellington	2
10	(Samoa) Mike Saofaiga	(Samoa) Kiwi	2
10	(Papua New Guinea) Tommy Semmy	(Papua New Guinea) Hekari United	2
10	(French Polynesia) Alvin Tehau	(French Polynesia) Tefana	2
10	(French Polynesia) Tunoa Tevaerai	(French Polynesia) Tefana	2
10	(French Polynesia) Taumihau Tiatia	(French Polynesia) Tefana	2

=== Awards ===
Award	Player	Team
Golden Ball	(Solomon Islands) Micah Lea'alafa	(New Zealand) Auckland City
Golden Boot	(Portugal) João Moreira	(New Zealand) Auckland City
Golden Gloves	(New Zealand) Scott Basalaj	(New Zealand) Team Wellington
Fair Play Award	—	(Papua New Guinea) Hekari United

== See also ==
- 2016 FIFA Club World Cup
