= 1999 CAF Champions League final =

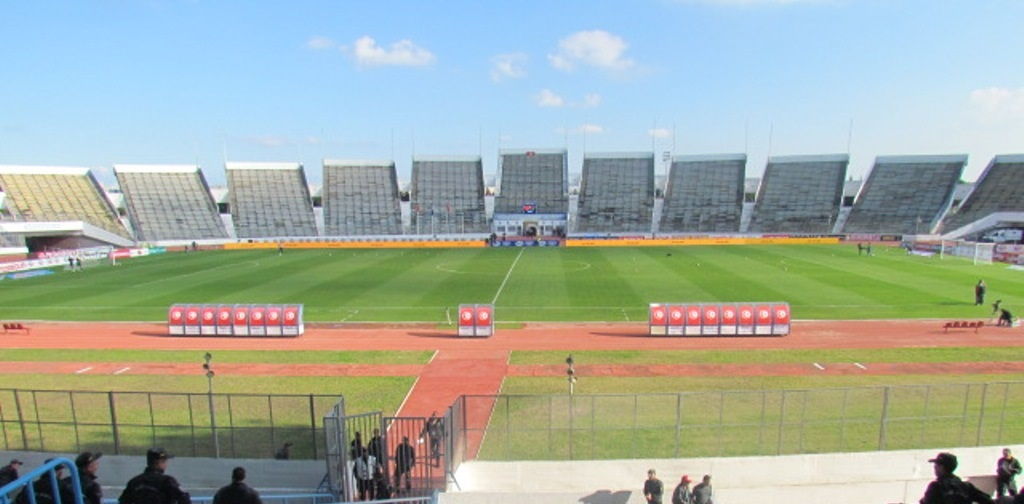
- El Menzah Stadium hosted the podium where Raja CA lifted the trophy
- Event: 1999 CAF Champions League
Raja CA	ES Tunis
(Morocco)	(Tunisia)
0	0
- Raja CA won 4–3 on penalties

First leg
Raja CA	ES Tunis
0	0
- Date: 27 November 1999
- Venue: Stade Père Jégo, Casablanca
- Referee: Mathabella Petros (South Africa)
- Attendance: 10 000

Second leg
ES Tunis	Raja CA
0	0
- Date: 12 December 1999
- Venue: Stade El Menzah, Tunis
- Referee: Manuel Monteiro Duarte (Cape Verde)
- Attendance: 50 000

The 1999 CAF Champions League final was a football tie held over two legs in November and December 1999. Raja CA of Morocco beat ES Tunis of Tunisia on penalties after their two-legged tie ended goalless.

== Qualified teams ==
In the following table, finals until 1996 were in the African Cup of Champions Club era, since 1997 were in the CAF Champions League era.

Team	Region	Previous finals appearances (bold indicates winners)
(Morocco) Raja CA	UNAF (North Africa)	**1989**, **1997**
(Tunisia) ES Tunis	UNAF (North Africa)	**1994**

== Venues ==
=== Stade Père Jégo ===
Stade Père Jégo is a multi-purpose stadium in Casablanca, Morocco. It is used mostly for football matches and is the home ground of Racing Casablanca.

The stadium currently holds 10,000 spectators.

Raja CA was forced to play the first leg of the final match on this stadium, due to the start of renovation at Mohammed V Stadium in view of Morocco's bid for the organization of the 2006 FIFA World Cup, green and red seats were installed on the side stands limiting its capacity to 45,891 seats without counting South (Magana) and North (Frimija) turns which have no seat.

=== Stade El Menzah ===
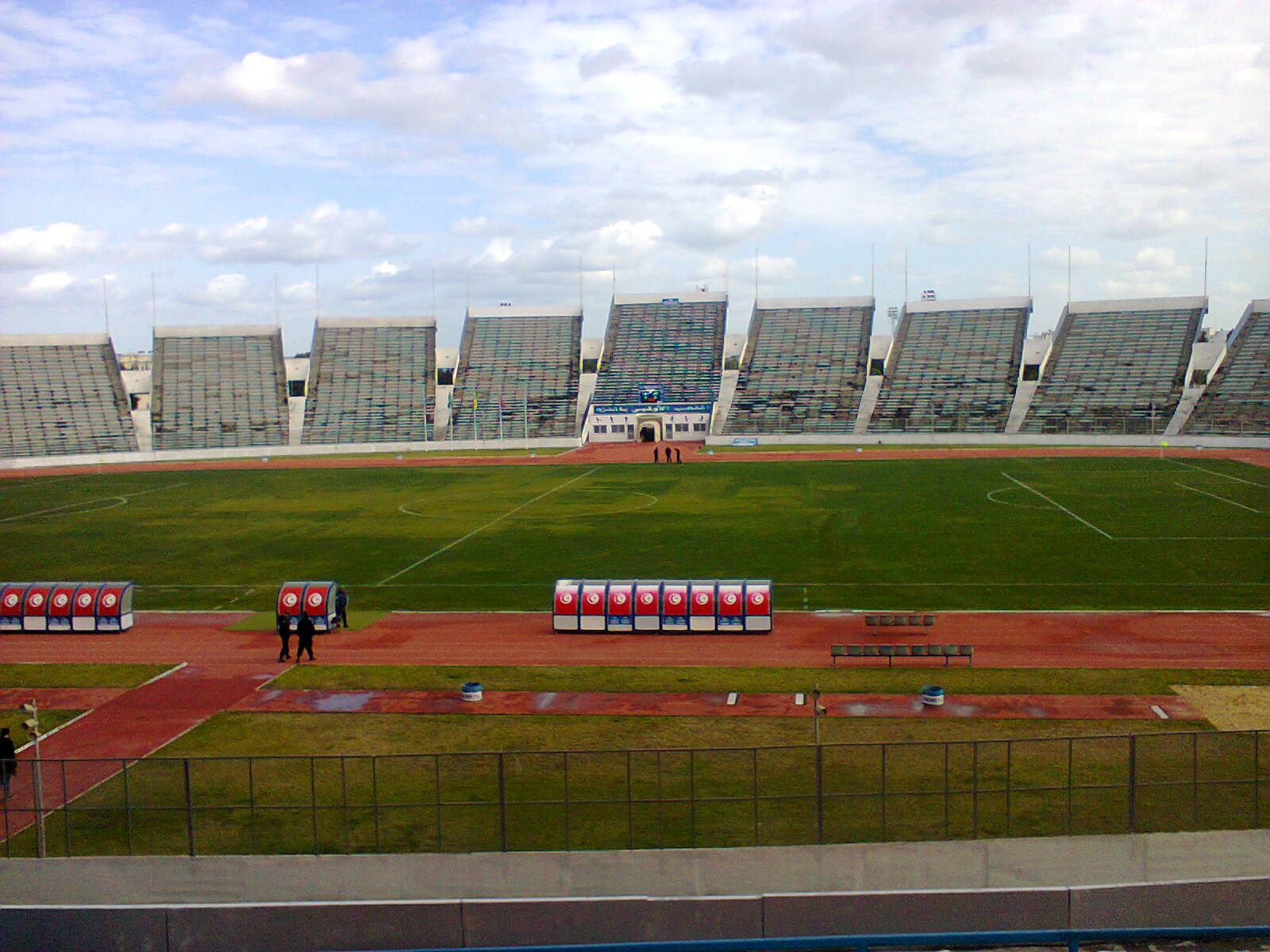
Stade El Menzah in Tunis, Tunisia hosted the second leg.

Stade Olympique El Menzah is a multi-purpose stadium, located in the north of Tunis, Tunisia.

It is built to host the 1967 Mediterranean Games at the same time as the Olympic swimming pool and gymnasium. Since then, it is an integral part of Tunisia's main sports complex. Tunisia's three major football teams, ES Tunis, Club Africain and Stade Tunisien played their games there. The stadium is completely renovated for the 1994 African Cup of Nations. It has a capacity of 39,858 seats. The VIP section consists of a grandstand and 2 salons that can accommodate 300 people in a "cocktail" configuration.

== Road to final ==
(Morocco) Raja CA				Round	(Tunisia) ES Tunis			
Opponent	Agg.	1st leg	2nd leg	Qualifying rounds	Opponent	Agg.	1st leg	2nd leg
(Senegal) ASEC Ndiambour	4–1	0–1 (A)	4–0 (H)	First round	(Libya) Al-Mahalah	4–1	2–1 (A)	2–0 (H)
(Mali) Djoliba AC	3–3 (7-6 p)	2–1 (H)	1–2 (A)	Second round	(Sudan) Al-Hilal	8–3	5–0 (H)	3–3 (A)
Opponent	Result			Group stage	Opponent	Result		
(Ghana) Hearts of Oak	1–0 (H)			Matchday 1	(Ivory Coast) ASEC Mimosas	3–0 (H)		
(Egypt) Al Ahly	1–0 (A)			Matchday 2	(Zimbabwe) Dynamos Harare	2–0 (A)		
(Nigeria) Shooting Stars	1–0 (H)			Matchday 3	(Réunion) SS Saint-Louisienne	5–0 (H)		
(Nigeria) Shooting Stars	0–1 (A)			Matchday 4	(Réunion) SS Saint-Louisienne	2–0 (A)		
(Ghana) Hearts of Oak	0–0 (A)			Matchday 5	(Ivory Coast) ASEC Mimosas	0–1 (A)		
(Egypt) Al Ahly	1–1 (H)			Matchday 6	(Zimbabwe) Dynamos Harare	1–0 (H)		
Group A Winner: Pos / Team / Pld / W / D / L / GF / GA / GD / Pts / Qualification; 1 / (Morocco) Raja Casablanca / 6 / 3 / 2 / 1 / 4 / 2 / +2 / **11** / Final; 2 / (Egypt) Al Ahly / 6 / 3 / 1 / 2 / 11 / 7 / +4 / **10**; 3 / (Ghana) Hearts of Oak / 6 / 2 / 2 / 2 / 7 / 6 / +1 / **8**; 4 / (Nigeria) Shooting Stars / 6 / 1 / 1 / 4 / 6 / 13 / −7 / **4**; Source:				Final standings	Group B Winner: Pos / Team / Pld / W / D / L / GF / GA / GD / Pts / Qualification; 1 / (Tunisia) ES Tunis / 6 / 5 / 0 / 1 / 13 / 1 / +12 / **15** / Final; 2 / (Ivory Coast) ASEC Mimosas / 6 / 3 / 1 / 2 / 7 / 6 / +1 / **10**; 3 / (Zimbabwe) Dynamos Harare / 6 / 2 / 0 / 4 / 9 / 9 / 0 / **6**; 4 / (Réunion) SS Saint-Louisienne / 6 / 1 / 1 / 4 / 4 / 17 / −13 / **4**; Source:			

== Format ==
The final was decided over two legs, with aggregate goals used to determine the winner. If the sides were level on aggregate after the second leg, the away goals rule would have been applied, and if still level, the tie would have proceeded directly to a penalty shootout (no extra time is played).

== Matches ==
=== First leg ===
27 November 1999
17:00 UTC+1

Raja CA (Morocco)	0–0	(Tunisia) ES Tunis

Stade Père Jégo, Casablanca
Attendance: 10,000
Referee: Mathabella Petros (South Africa)

=== Second leg ===
12 December 1999
17:00 UTC+1

ES Tunis (Tunisia)	0–0	(Morocco) Raja CA
Penalties
Badra (penalty scored); Kanzari (penalty missed); Gabsi (penalty scored); Chihi (penalty scored); El Ouaer (penalty missed)	3–4	(penalty scored) Khoubache; (penalty scored) El Karkouri; (penalty missed) Safri; (penalty scored) Aboub; (penalty scored) El Haimer

Stade El Menzah, Tunis
Attendance: 50,000
Referee: Manuel Monteiro Duarte (Cape Verde)
