= List of FIFA Club World Cup participants =

The FIFA Club World Cup is an international association football competition organised by the FIFA, the sport's global governing body. The championship was first contested as the FIFA Club World Championship in 2000. It was not held between 2001 and 2004 due to a combination of factors, most importantly the collapse of FIFA's marketing partner International Sport and Leisure. Following a change in format which saw the FIFA Club World Championship absorb the Intercontinental Cup, it was relaunched in 2005 and took its current name the season afterwards.

The current format, in use since the competition was revamped ahead of the 2025 edition, features 32 teams competing for the title at venues within the host nation; 12 teams from Europe, 6 from South America, 4 from Asia, 4 from Africa, 4 from North, Central America and Caribbean, 1 from Oceania, and 1 team from the host nation. The teams are drawn into eight groups of four, with each team playing three Group stage matches in a round-robin format. The top two teams from each group advance to the knockout stage, starting with the round of 16 and culminating with the final.

== Debut of club teams ==
Each successive FIFA Club World Cup has had at least one club team appearing for the first time.

Year	Debuting teams		
Year	Teams	No.	Cum.
2000	(Saudi Arabia) Al-Nassr, (Brazil) Corinthians, (England) Manchester United, (Mexico) Necaxa, (Morocco) Raja Casablanca, (Spain) Real Madrid, (Australia) South Melbourne, (Brazil) Vasco da Gama	8	8
2005	(Egypt) Al Ahly, (Saudi Arabia) Al-Ittihad, (England) Liverpool, (Brazil) São Paulo, (Costa Rica) Saprissa, (Australia) Sydney FC	6	14
2006	(Mexico) América, (New Zealand) Auckland City, (Spain) Barcelona, (Brazil) Internacional, (South Korea) Jeonbuk Hyundai Motors	5	19
2007	(Argentina) Boca Juniors, (Tunisia) Étoile du Sahel, (Italy) Milan, (Mexico) Pachuca, (Iran) Sepahan, (Japan) Urawa Red Diamonds, (New Zealand) Waitakere United	7	26
2008	(Australia) Adelaide United, (Japan) Gamba Osaka, (Ecuador) LDU Quito	3	29
2009	(United Arab Emirates) Al-Ahli (Note: Shabab Al-Ahli competed as Al-Ahli), (Mexico) Atlante, (Argentina) Estudiantes, (South Korea) Pohang Steelers, (Democratic Republic of the Congo) TP Mazembe	5	34
2010	(United Arab Emirates) Al-Wahda, (Papua New Guinea) Hekari United, (Italy) Internazionale, (South Korea) Seongnam Ilhwa Chunma (Note: Seongnam FC competed as Seongnam Ilhwa Chunma)	4	38
2011	(Qatar) Al-Sadd, (Tunisia) Espérance de Tunis, (Japan) Kashiwa Reysol, (Mexico) Monterrey, (Brazil) Santos	5	43
2012	(England) Chelsea, (Japan) Sanfrecce Hiroshima, (South Korea) Ulsan Hyundai (Note: Ulsan HD competed as Ulsan Hyundai)	3	46
2013	(Brazil) Atlético Mineiro, (Germany) Bayern Munich, (China) Guangzhou Evergrande (Note: Guangzhou competed as Guangzhou Evergrande)	3	49
2014	(Mexico) Cruz Azul, (Algeria) ES Sétif, (Morocco) Moghreb Tétouan, (Argentina) San Lorenzo, (Australia) Western Sydney Wanderers	5	54
2015	(Argentina) River Plate	1	55
2016	(Colombia) Atlético Nacional, (Japan) Kashima Antlers, (South Africa) Mamelodi Sundowns	3	58
2017	(United Arab Emirates) Al-Jazira, (Brazil) Grêmio, (Morocco) Wydad Casablanca	3	61
2018	(United Arab Emirates) Al-Ain, (Mexico) Guadalajara, (New Zealand) Team Wellington	3	64
2019	(Saudi Arabia) Al-Hilal, (Brazil) Flamengo, (New Caledonia) Hienghène Sport	3	67
2020	(Qatar) Al-Duhail, (Brazil) Palmeiras, (Mexico) UANL	3	70
2021	(French Polynesia) AS Pirae	1	71
2022	(United States) Seattle Sounders FC	1	72
2023	(Brazil) Fluminense, (Mexico) León, (England) Manchester City	3	75
2025	(Spain) Atlético Madrid, (Portugal) Benfica, (Germany) Borussia Dortmund, (Brazil) Botafogo, (United States) Inter Miami CF, (Italy) Juventus, (United States) Los Angeles FC, (France) Paris Saint-Germain, (Portugal) Porto, (Austria) Red Bull Salzburg	10	85
2029	(Saudi Arabia) Al-Ahli, (Egypt) Pyramids, (Mexico) Toluca	3	88

== Confederation records ==
=== AFC ===
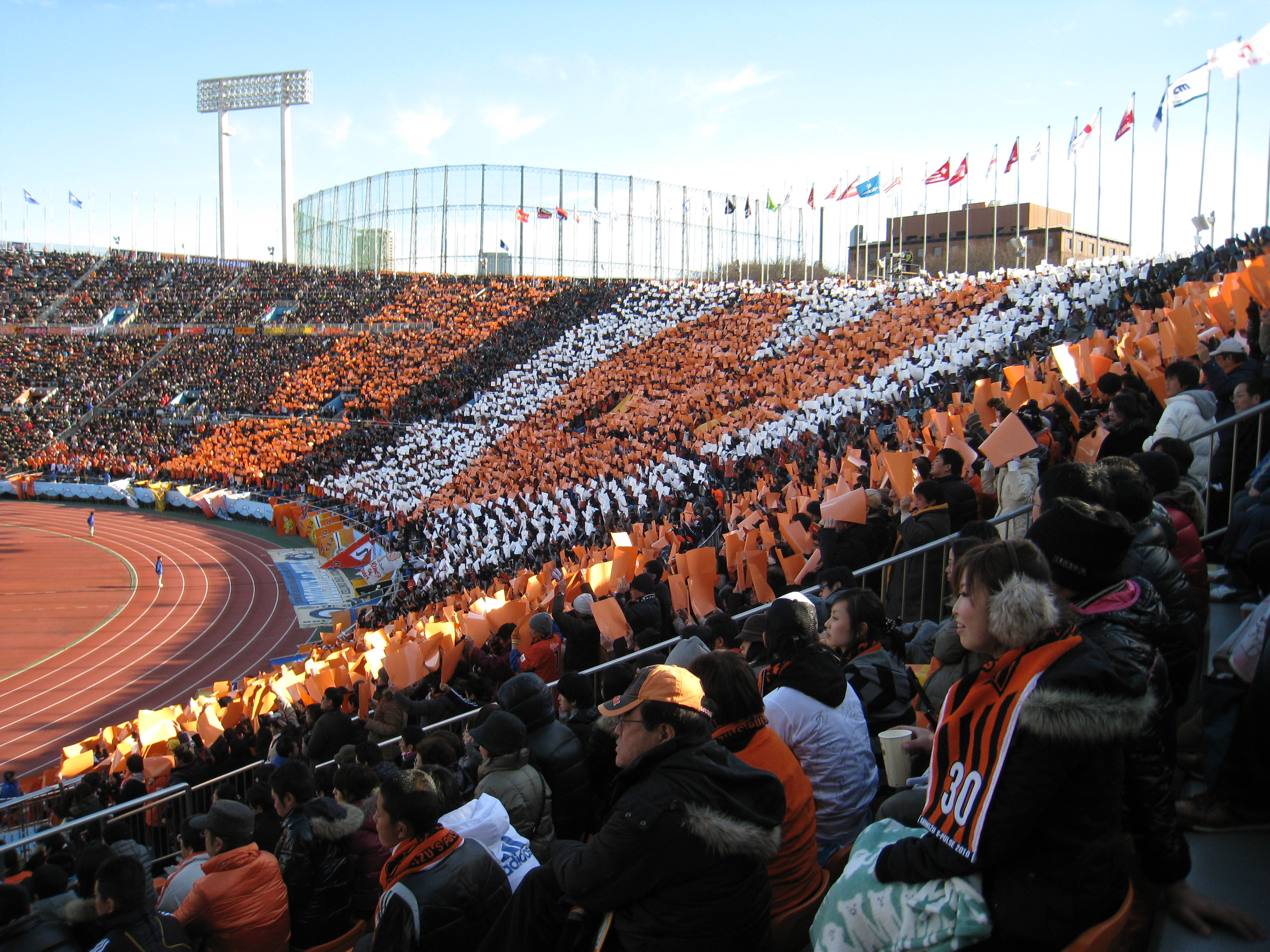
The J.League, Japan's premier club competition, has been Asia's best representative, with one silver medal and three bronze medals earned.

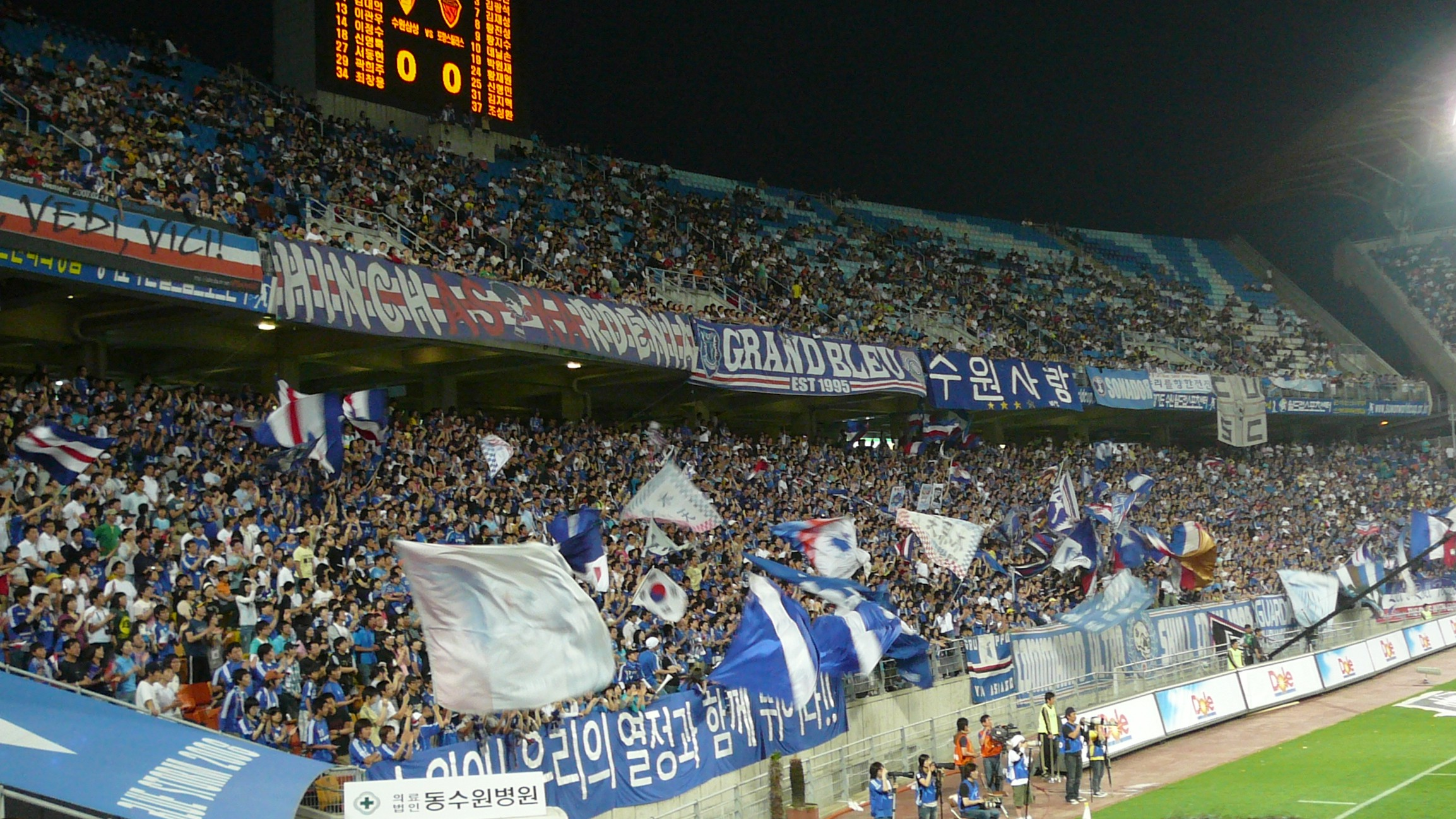
South Korea's K League has been Asia's second most constant representatives after the J. League, with four different clubs playing in the FIFA Club World Cup.

Performance of AFC clubs
Year	Club	Method of qualification	Performance	Ref(s)
2000	(Saudi Arabia) Al-Nassr (1/1)	Winners of the 1998 Asian Super Cup	Group stage	
2005	(Saudi Arabia) Al-Ittihad (1/2)	Winners of the 2005 AFC Champions League	Fourth place	
2006	(South Korea) Jeonbuk Hyundai Motors (1/2)	Winners of the 2006 AFC Champions League	Fifth place	
2007	(Japan) Urawa Red Diamonds (1/4)	Winners of the 2007 AFC Champions League	Third place	
2007	(Iran) Sepahan (1/1)	Runners-up of the 2007 AFC Champions League	Fifth place (shared) (Note: The Fifth place match was not played for this tournament, so the two teams which lost in the quarter-finals were considered to share Fifth place.)	
2008	(Japan) Gamba Osaka (1/1)	Winners of the 2008 AFC Champions League	Third place	
2008	(Australia) Adelaide United (1/1)	Runners-up of the 2008 AFC Champions League	Fifth place	
2009	(South Korea) Pohang Steelers (1/1)	Winners of the 2009 AFC Champions League	Third place	
2009	(United Arab Emirates) Al-Ahli (1/1)	Winners of the 2008–09 UAE Pro League	Seventh place	
2010	(South Korea) Seongnam Ilhwa Chunma (1/1)	Winners of the 2010 AFC Champions League	Fourth place	
2010	(United Arab Emirates) Al-Wahda (1/1)	Winners of the 2009–10 UAE Pro League	Sixth place	
2011	(Qatar) Al-Sadd (1/2)	Winners of the 2011 AFC Champions League	Third place	
2011	(Japan) Kashiwa Reysol (1/1)	Winners of the 2011 J. League Division 1	Fourth place	
2012	(South Korea) Ulsan Hyundai (1/3)	Winners of the 2012 AFC Champions League	Sixth place	
2012	(Japan) Sanfrecce Hiroshima (1/2)	Winners of the 2012 J. League Division 1	Fifth place	
2013	(China) Guangzhou Evergrande (1/2)	Winners of the 2013 AFC Champions League	Fourth place	
2014	(Australia) Western Sydney Wanderers (1/1)	Winners of the 2014 AFC Champions League	Sixth place	
2015	(China) Guangzhou Evergrande (2/2)	Winners of the 2015 AFC Champions League	Fourth place	
2015	(Japan) Sanfrecce Hiroshima (2/2)	Winners of the 2015 J1 League	Third place	
2016	(South Korea) Jeonbuk Hyundai Motors (2/2)	Winners of the 2016 AFC Champions League	Fifth place	
2016	(Japan) Kashima Antlers (1/2)	Winners of the 2016 J1 League	Runners-up	
2017	(Japan) Urawa Red Diamonds (2/4)	Winners of the 2017 AFC Champions League	Fifth place	
2017	(United Arab Emirates) Al-Jazira (1/2)	Winners of the 2016–17 UAE Pro League	Fourth place	
2018	(Japan) Kashima Antlers (2/2)	Winners of the 2018 AFC Champions League	Fourth place	
2018	(United Arab Emirates) Al-Ain (1/2)	Winners of the 2017–18 UAE Pro League	Runners-up	
2019	(Saudi Arabia) Al-Hilal (1/4)	Winners of the 2019 AFC Champions League	Fourth place	
2019	(Qatar) Al-Sadd (2/2)	Winners of the 2018–19 Qatar Stars League	Sixth place	
2020	(South Korea) Ulsan Hyundai (2/3)	Winners of the 2020 AFC Champions League	Sixth place	
2020	(Qatar) Al-Duhail (1/1)	Winners of the 2019–20 Qatar Stars League	Fifth place	
2021	(Saudi Arabia) Al-Hilal (2/4)	Winners of the 2021 AFC Champions League	Fourth place	
2021	(United Arab Emirates) Al-Jazira (2/2)	Winners of the 2020–21 UAE Pro League	Sixth place	
2022	(Saudi Arabia) Al-Hilal (3/4)	Nominated by AFC	Runners-up	
2023	(Japan) Urawa Red Diamonds (3/4)	Winners of the 2022 AFC Champions League	Fourth place	
2023	(Saudi Arabia) Al-Ittihad (2/2)	Winners of the 2022–23 Saudi Pro League	Fifth place (shared)	
2025	(Saudi Arabia) Al-Hilal (4/4)	Winners of the 2021 AFC Champions League	Quarterfinals	
2025	(Japan) Urawa Red Diamonds (4/4)	Winners of the 2022 AFC Champions League	Group stage	
2025	(United Arab Emirates) Al-Ain (2/2)	Winners of the 2023–24 AFC Champions League	Group stage	
2025	(South Korea) Ulsan HD (3/3)	AFC 4-year ranking	Group stage	

=== CAF ===
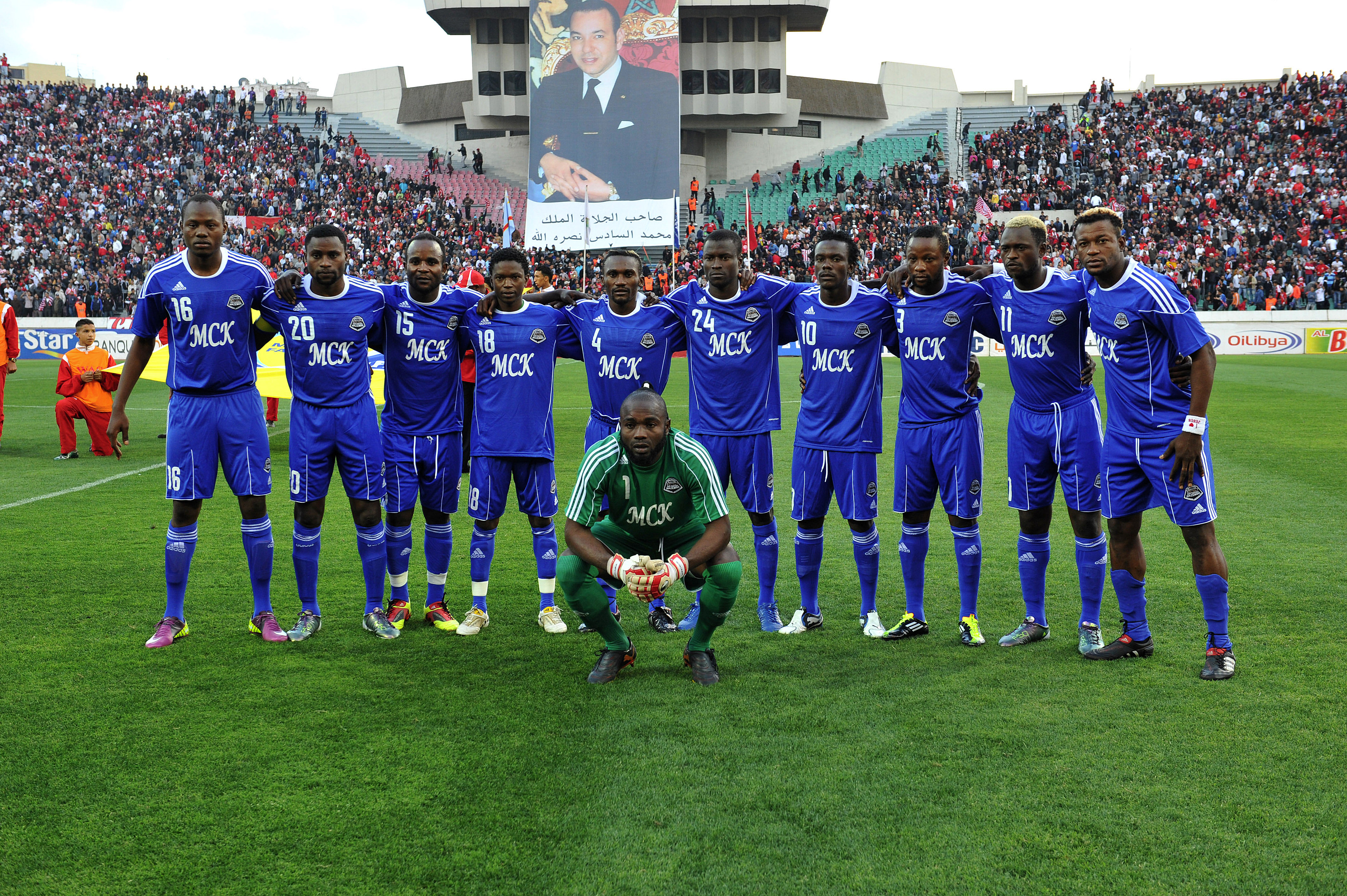
TP Mazembe became the first non-European and non-South American club to reach the final when they defeated Internacional in 2010.

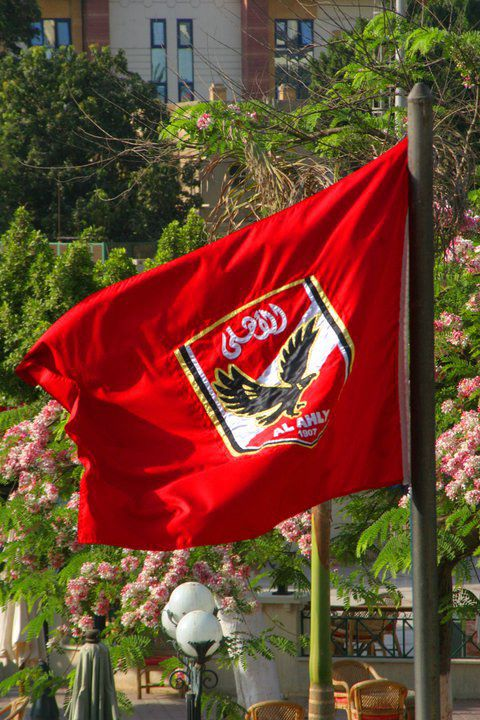
Al Ahly have made the most appearances in the FIFA Club World Cup among all African clubs, with ten.

Performance of CAF clubs
Year	Club	Method of qualification	Performance	Ref(s)
2000	(Morocco) Raja Casablanca (1/2)	Winners of the 1999 CAF Champions League	Group stage	
2005	(Egypt) Al Ahly (1/10)	Winners of the 2005 CAF Champions League	Sixth place	
2006	(Egypt) Al Ahly (2/10)	Winners of the 2006 CAF Champions League	Third place	
2007	(Tunisia) Étoile du Sahel (1/1)	Winners of the 2007 CAF Champions League	Fourth place	
2008	(Egypt) Al Ahly (3/10)	Winners of the 2008 CAF Champions League	Sixth place	
2009	(Democratic Republic of the Congo) TP Mazembe (1/3)	Winners of the 2009 CAF Champions League	Sixth place	
2010	(Democratic Republic of the Congo) TP Mazembe (2/3)	Winners of the 2010 CAF Champions League	Runners-up	
2011	(Tunisia) Espérance de Tunis (1/4)	Winners of the 2011 CAF Champions League	Sixth place	
2012	(Egypt) Al Ahly (4/10)	Winners of the 2012 CAF Champions League	Fourth place	
2013	(Egypt) Al Ahly (5/10)	Winners of the 2013 CAF Champions League	Sixth place	
2013	(Morocco) Raja Casablanca (2/2)	Winners of the 2012–13 Botola	Runners-up	
2014	(Algeria) ES Sétif (1/1)	Winners of the 2014 CAF Champions League	Fifth place	
2014	(Morocco) Moghreb Tétouan (1/1)	Winners of the 2013–14 Botola	Seventh place	
2015	(Democratic Republic of the Congo) TP Mazembe (3/3)	Winners of the 2015 CAF Champions League	Sixth place	
2016	(South Africa) Mamelodi Sundowns (1/2)	Winners of the 2016 CAF Champions League	Sixth place	
2017	(Morocco) Wydad Casablanca (1/3)	Winners of the 2017 CAF Champions League	Sixth place	
2018	(Tunisia) Espérance de Tunis (2/4)	Winners of the 2018 CAF Champions League	Fifth place	
2019	(Tunisia) Espérance de Tunis (3/4)	Winners of the 2018–19 CAF Champions League	Fifth place	
2020	(Egypt) Al Ahly (6/10)	Winners of the 2019–20 CAF Champions League	Third place	
2021	(Egypt) Al Ahly (7/10)	Winners of the 2020–21 CAF Champions League	Third place	
2022	(Morocco) Wydad Casablanca (2/3)	Winners of the 2021–22 CAF Champions League	Fifth place (shared)	
2022	(Egypt) Al Ahly (8/10)	Runners-up of the 2021–22 CAF Champions League	Fourth place	
2023	(Egypt) Al Ahly (9/10)	Winners of the 2022–23 CAF Champions League	Third place	
2025	(Egypt) Al Ahly (10/10)	Winners of the 2020–21, 2022–23, and 2023–24 CAF Champions League	Group stage	
2025	(Morocco) Wydad Casablanca (3/3)	Winners of the 2021–22 CAF Champions League	Group stage	
2025	(Tunisia) Espérance de Tunis (4/4)	CAF 4-year ranking	Group stage	
2025	(South Africa) Mamelodi Sundowns (2/2)	CAF 4-year ranking	Group stage	

=== CONCACAF ===
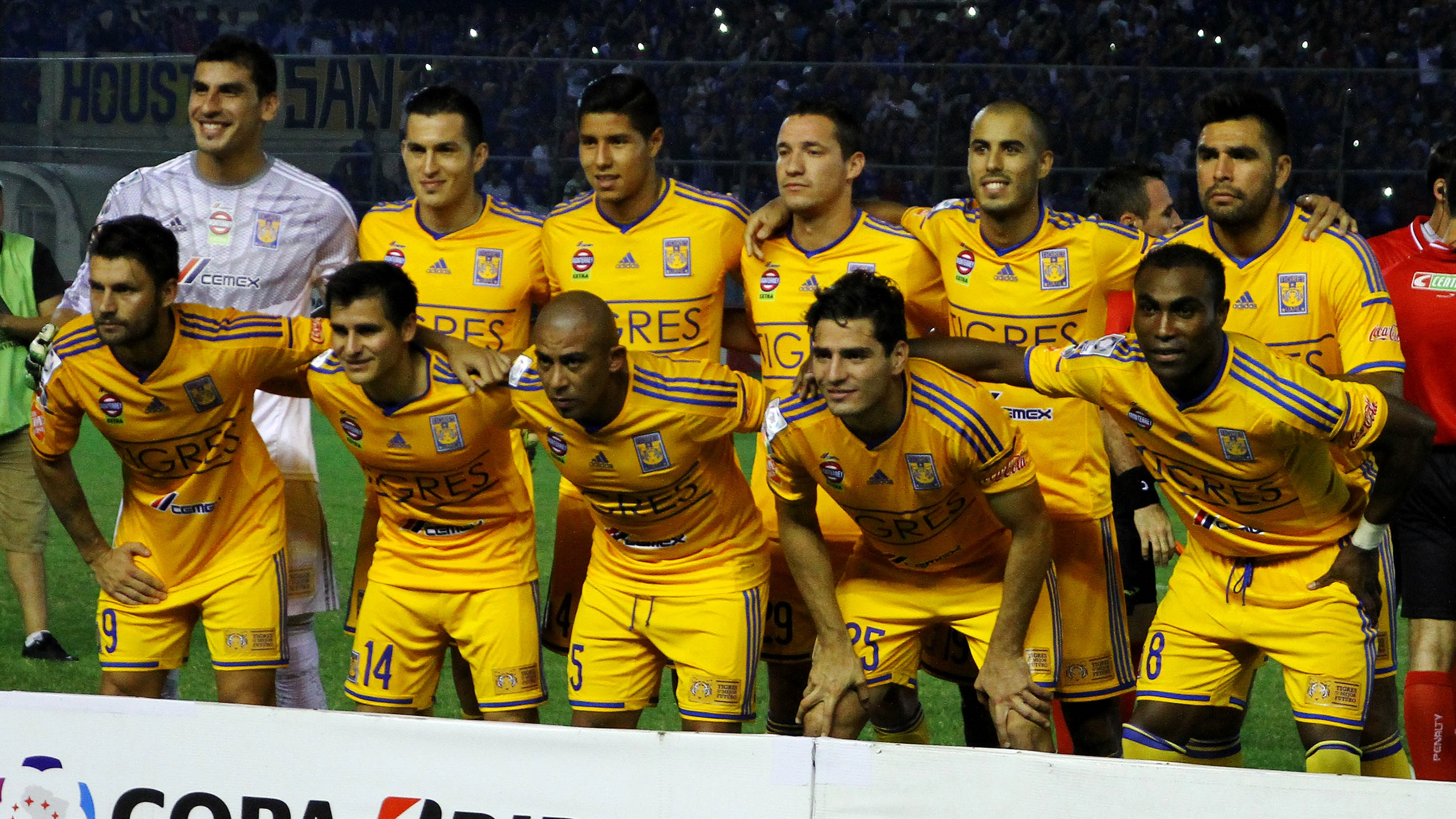
UANL became the first team from CONCACAF to reach the final of the FIFA Club World Cup after defeating Palmeiras in the 2020 edition.

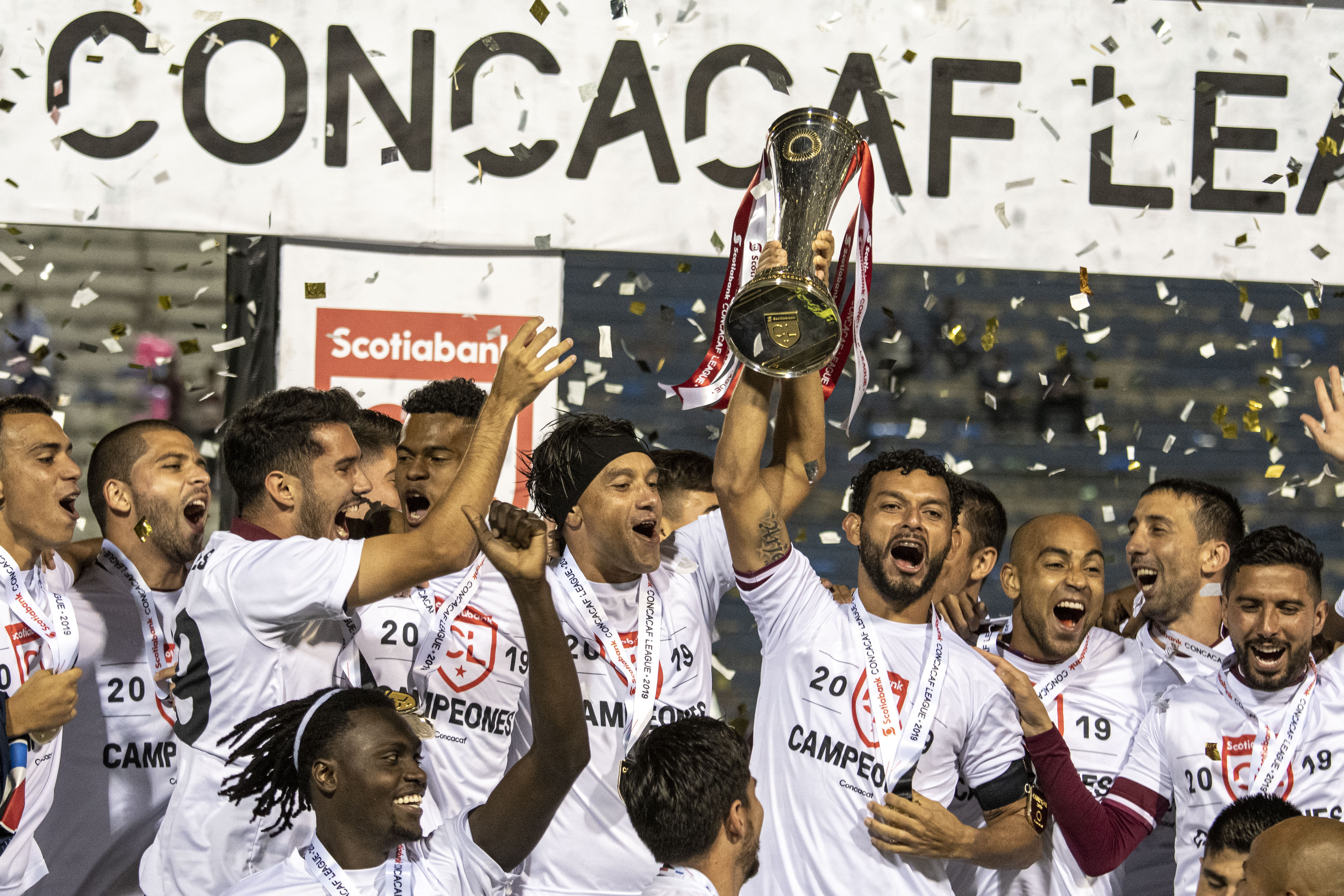
Saprissa of Costa Rica is the first non-Mexican CONCACAF club to enter the tournament, earning a bronze medal in 2005.

Performance of CONCACAF clubs
Year	Club	Method of qualification	Performance	Ref(s)
2000	(Mexico) Necaxa (1/1)	Winners of the 1999 CONCACAF Champions' Cup	Third place	
2005	(Costa Rica) Saprissa (1/1)	Winners of the 2005 CONCACAF Champions' Cup	Third place	
2006	(Mexico) América (1/3)	Winners of the 2006 CONCACAF Champions' Cup	Fourth place	
2007	(Mexico) Pachuca (1/5)	Winners of the 2007 CONCACAF Champions' Cup	Fifth place (shared)	
2008	(Mexico) Pachuca (2/5)	Winners of the 2008 CONCACAF Champions' Cup	Fourth place	
2009	(Mexico) Atlante (1/1)	Winners of the 2008–09 CONCACAF Champions League	Fourth place	
2010	(Mexico) Pachuca (3/5)	Winners of the 2009–10 CONCACAF Champions League	Fifth place	
2011	(Mexico) Monterrey (1/6)	Winners of the 2010–11 CONCACAF Champions League	Fifth place	
2012	(Mexico) Monterrey (2/6)	Winners of the 2011–12 CONCACAF Champions League	Third place	
2013	(Mexico) Monterrey (3/6)	Winners of the 2012–13 CONCACAF Champions League	Fifth place	
2014	(Mexico) Cruz Azul (1/1)	Winners of the 2013–14 CONCACAF Champions League	Fourth place	
2015	(Mexico) América (2/3)	Winners of the 2014–15 CONCACAF Champions League	Fifth place	
2016	(Mexico) América (3/3)	Winners of the 2015–16 CONCACAF Champions League	Fourth place	
2017	(Mexico) Pachuca (4/5)	Winners of the 2016–17 CONCACAF Champions League	Third place	
2018	(Mexico) Guadalajara (1/1)	Winners of the 2018 CONCACAF Champions League	Sixth place	
2019	(Mexico) Monterrey (4/6)	Winners of the 2019 CONCACAF Champions League	Third place	
2020	(Mexico) UANL (1/1)	Winners of the 2020 CONCACAF Champions League	Runners-up	
2021	(Mexico) Monterrey (5/6)	Winners of the 2021 CONCACAF Champions League	Fifth place	
2022	(United States) Seattle Sounders FC (1/2)	Winners of the 2022 CONCACAF Champions League	Fifth place (shared)	
2023	(Mexico) León (1/1)	Winners of the 2023 CONCACAF Champions League	Fifth place (shared)	
2025	(Mexico) Monterrey (6/6)	Winners of the 2021 CONCACAF Champions League	Round of 16	
2025	(United States) Seattle Sounders FC (2/2)	Winners of the 2022 CONCACAF Champions League	Group stage	
2025	(Mexico) Pachuca (5/5)	Winners of the 2024 CONCACAF Champions Cup	Group stage	
2025	(United States) Inter Miami CF (1/1)	Winners of the 2024 MLS Supporters' Shield	Round of 16	
2025	(United States) Los Angeles FC (1/1)	Winners of the play-in match	Group stage	

=== CONMEBOL ===
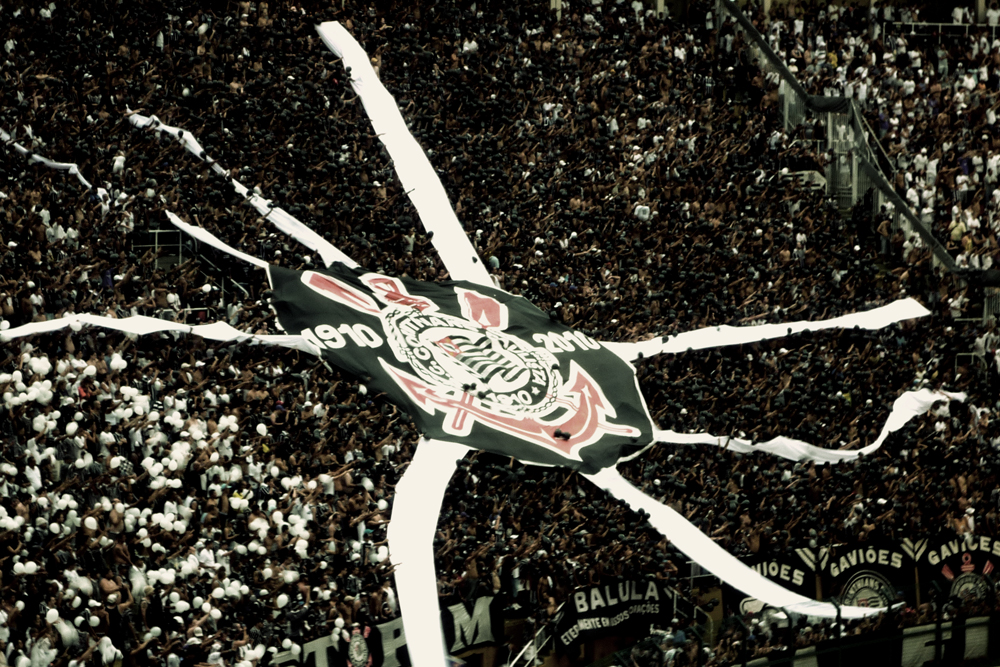
Corinthians are the only South American club to have appeared in more than one final and also to have won the competition more than once (2000 and 2012 editions). The Timão are also the only eventual winners to have qualified by virtue of being the host nation's national champions.

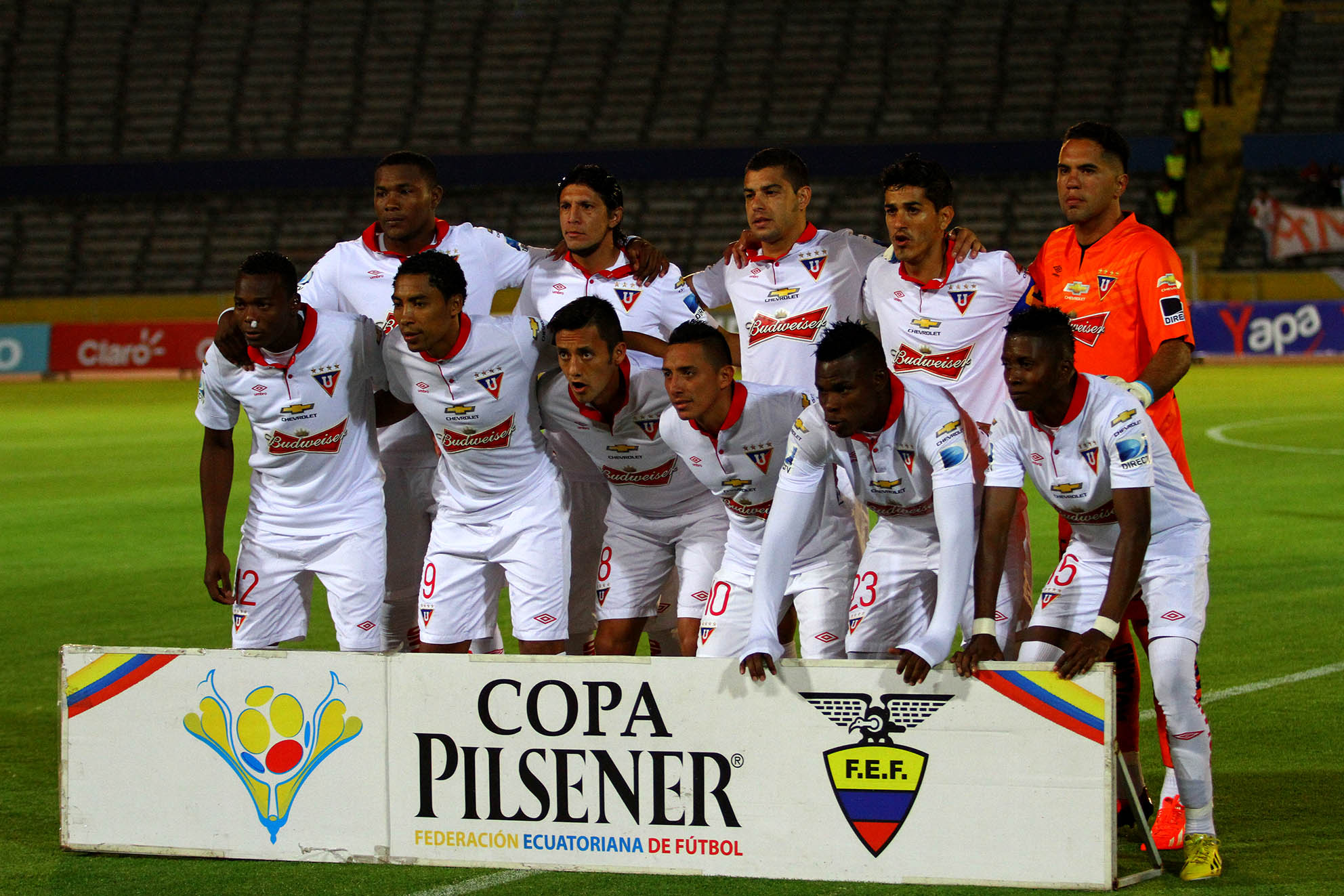
Ecuador's LDU Quito was the first non-Argentine and non-Brazilian club to represent CONMEBOL during the FIFA Club World Cup.

Performance of CONMEBOL clubs
Year	Club	Method of qualification	Performance	Ref(s)
2000	(Brazil) Vasco da Gama (1/1)	Winners of the 1998 Copa Libertadores	Runners-up	
2000	(Brazil) Corinthians (1/2)	Winners of the 1999 Campeonato Brasileiro Série A	Champions	
2005	(Brazil) São Paulo (1/1)	Winners of the 2005 Copa Libertadores	Champions	
2006	(Brazil) Internacional (1/2)	Winners of the 2006 Copa Libertadores	Champions	
2007	(Argentina) Boca Juniors (1/2)	Winners of the 2007 Copa Libertadores	Runners-up	
2008	(Ecuador) LDU Quito (1/1)	Winners of the 2008 Copa Libertadores	Runners-up	
2009	(Argentina) Estudiantes (1/1)	Winners of the 2009 Copa Libertadores	Runners-up	
2010	(Brazil) Internacional (2/2)	Winners of the 2010 Copa Libertadores	Third place	
2011	(Brazil) Santos (1/1)	Winners of the 2011 Copa Libertadores	Runners-up	
2012	(Brazil) Corinthians (2/2)	Winners of the 2012 Copa Libertadores	Champions	
2013	(Brazil) Atlético Mineiro (1/1)	Winners of the 2013 Copa Libertadores	Third place	
2014	(Argentina) San Lorenzo (1/1)	Winners of the 2014 Copa Libertadores	Runners-up	
2015	(Argentina) River Plate (1/3)	Winners of the 2015 Copa Libertadores	Runners-up	
2016	(Colombia) Atlético Nacional (1/1)	Winners of the 2016 Copa Libertadores	Third place	
2017	(Brazil) Grêmio (1/1)	Winners of the 2017 Copa Libertadores	Runners-up	
2018	(Argentina) River Plate (2/3)	Winners of the 2018 Copa Libertadores	Third place	
2019	(Brazil) Flamengo (1/3)	Winners of the 2019 Copa Libertadores	Runners-up	
2020	(Brazil) Palmeiras (1/3)	Winners of the 2020 Copa Libertadores	Fourth place	
2021	(Brazil) Palmeiras (2/3)	Winners of the 2021 Copa Libertadores	Runners-up	
2022	(Brazil) Flamengo (2/3)	Winners of the 2022 Copa Libertadores	Third place	
2023	(Brazil) Fluminense (1/2)	Winners of the 2023 Copa Libertadores	Runners-up	
2025	(Brazil) Palmeiras (3/3)	Winners of the 2021 Copa Libertadores	Quarterfinals	
2025	(Brazil) Flamengo (3/3)	Winners of the 2022 Copa Libertadores	Round of 16	
2025	(Brazil) Fluminense (2/2)	Winners of the 2023 Copa Libertadores	Semifinals	
2025	(Brazil) Botafogo (1/1)	Winners of the 2024 Copa Libertadores	Round of 16	
2025	(Argentina) River Plate (3/3)	CONMEBOL 4-year ranking	Group stage	
2025	(Argentina) Boca Juniors (2/2)	CONMEBOL 4-year ranking	Group stage	

=== OFC ===
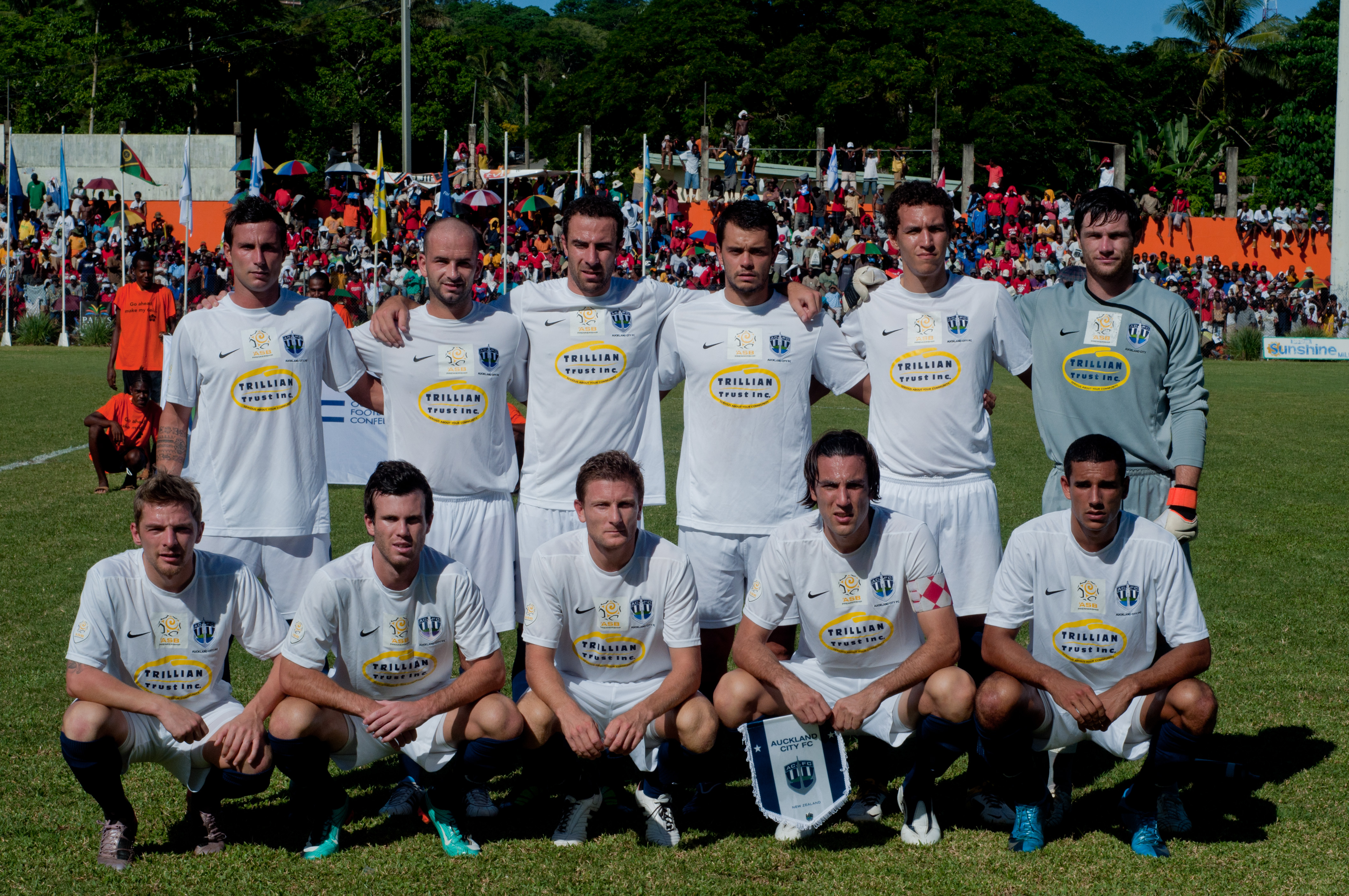
New Zealand team Auckland City holds the record of appearances in the tournament with twelve, their best result being a Third place finish in 2014.

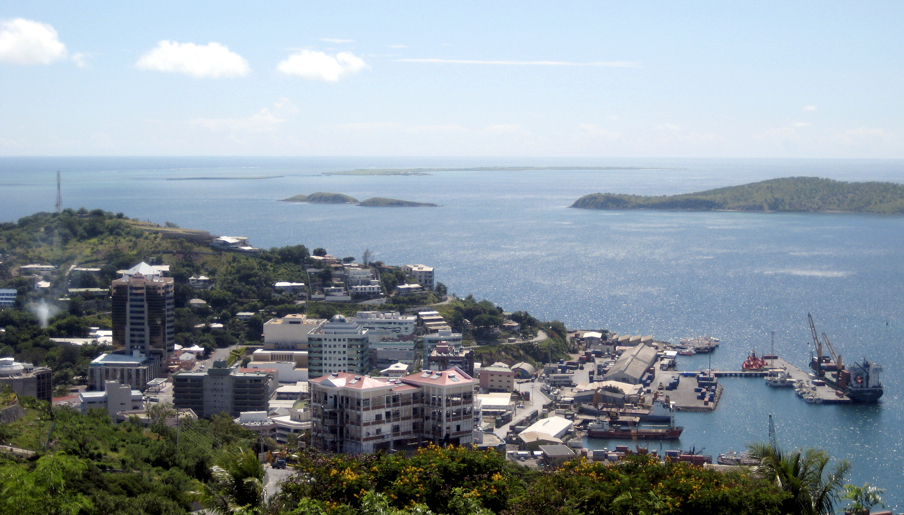
Hekari United from Port Moresby, Papua New Guinea, became the first club outside New Zealand and Australia to represent the OFC at the FIFA Club World Cup.

Performance of OFC clubs
Year	Club	Method of qualification	Performance	Ref(s)
2000	(Australia) South Melbourne (1/1)	Winners of the 1999 Oceania Club Championship	Group stage	
2005	(Australia) Sydney FC (1/1)	Winners of the 2004–05 Oceania Club Championship	Fifth place	
2006	(New Zealand) Auckland City (1/12)	Winners of the 2006 Oceania Club Championship	Sixth place	
2007	(New Zealand) Waitakere United (1/2)	Winners of the 2007 OFC Champions League	Seventh place	
2008	(New Zealand) Waitakere United (2/2)	Winners of the 2007–08 OFC Champions League	Seventh place	
2009	(New Zealand) Auckland City (2/12)	Winners of the 2008–09 OFC Champions League	Fifth place	
2010	(Papua New Guinea) Hekari United (1/1)	Winners of the 2009–10 OFC Champions League	Seventh place	
2011	(New Zealand) Auckland City (3/12)	Winners of the 2010–11 OFC Champions League	Seventh place	
2012	(New Zealand) Auckland City (4/12)	Winners of the 2011–12 OFC Champions League	Seventh place	
2013	(New Zealand) Auckland City (5/12)	Winners of the 2012–13 OFC Champions League	Seventh place	
2014	(New Zealand) Auckland City (6/12)	Winners of the 2013–14 OFC Champions League	Third place	
2015	(New Zealand) Auckland City (7/12)	Winners of the 2014–15 OFC Champions League	Seventh place	
2016	(New Zealand) Auckland City (8/12)	Winners of the 2016 OFC Champions League	Seventh place	
2017	(New Zealand) Auckland City (9/12)	Winners of the 2017 OFC Champions League	Seventh place	
2018	(New Zealand) Team Wellington (1/1)	Winners of the 2018 OFC Champions League	Seventh place	
2019	(New Caledonia) Hienghène Sport (1/1)	Winners of the 2019 OFC Champions League	Seventh place	
2020	(New Zealand) ~~Auckland City~~	Nominated by OFC	Withdrew (Note: Auckland City withdrew from the 2020 tournament due to the COVID-19 pandemic and related quarantine measures required by the New Zealand authorities.)	
2021	(French Polynesia) AS Pirae (1/1)	Nominated by OFC	Seventh place	
2022	(New Zealand) Auckland City (10/12)	Winners of the 2022 OFC Champions League	Seventh place	
2023	(New Zealand) Auckland City (11/12)	Winners of the 2023 OFC Champions League	Seventh place	
2025	(New Zealand) Auckland City (12/12)	OFC 4-year ranking	Group stage	

=== UEFA ===
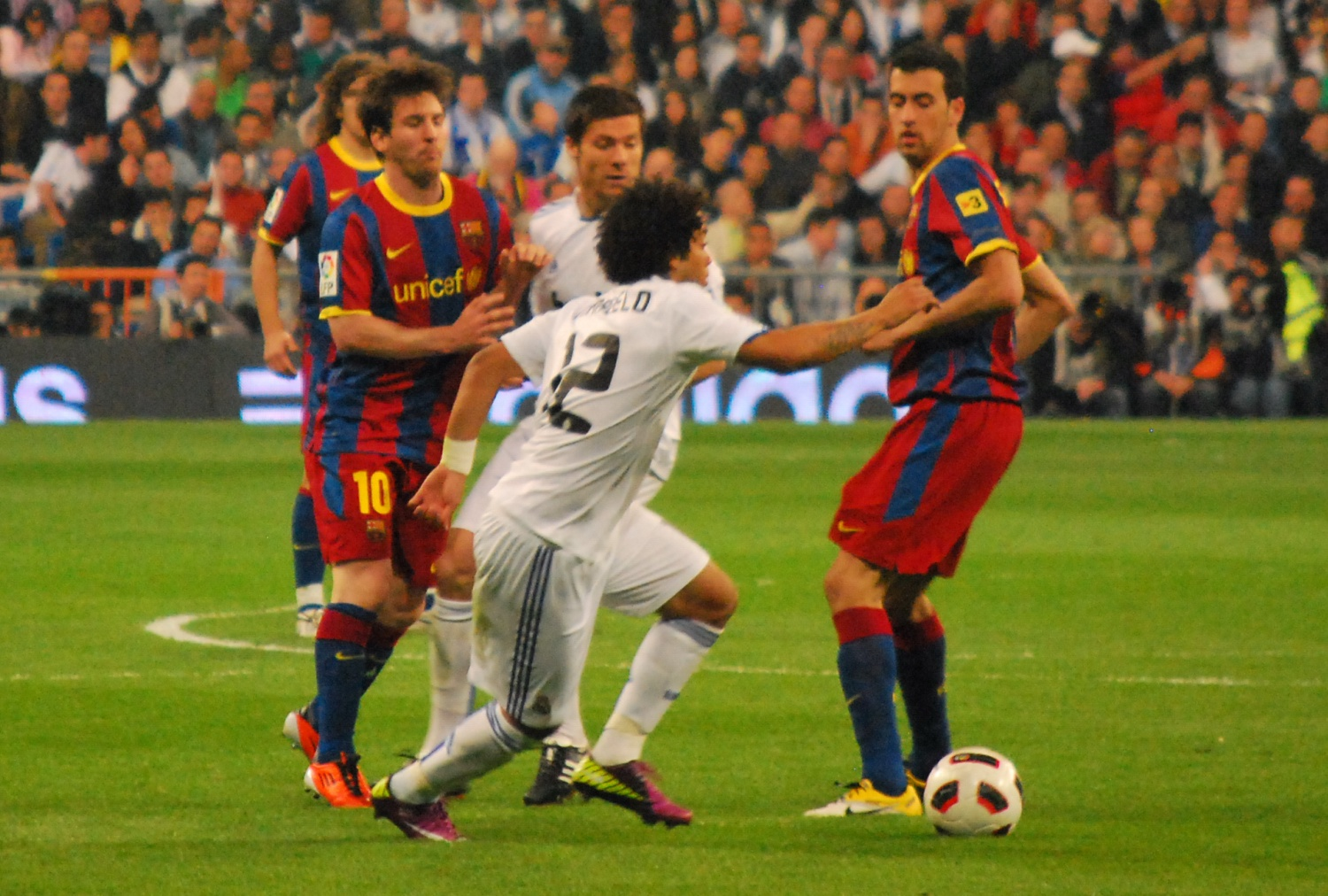
Spain's Real Madrid holds the all-time record of appearances as UEFA's representative with seven, and are the record title-holders of the tournament, with five (2014, 2016, 2017, 2018 and 2022). Real Madrid also holds the record of most appearances in the final, with five, followed by Spanish rivals Barcelona with four.

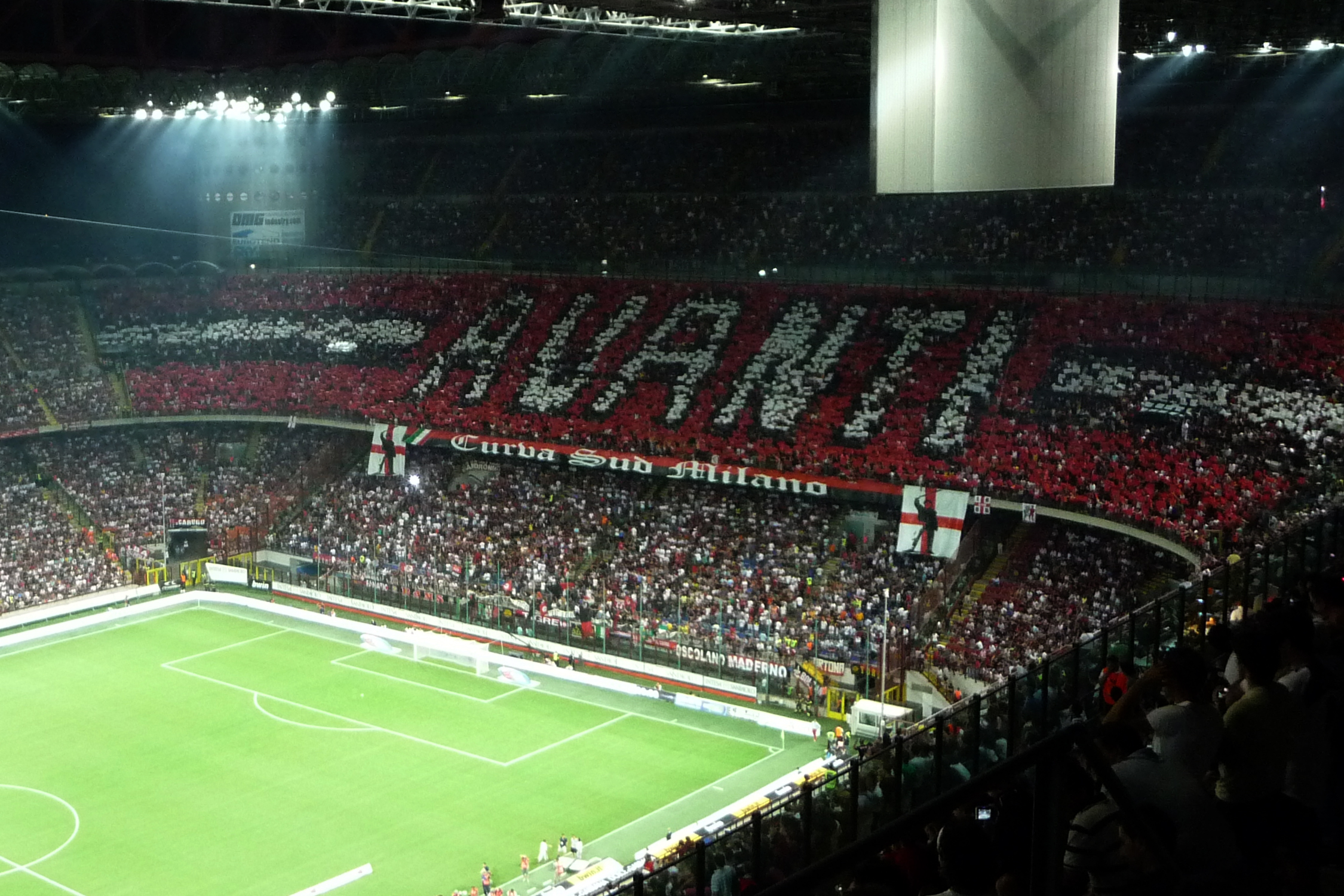
Italy's Serie A is the only national league with multiple representatives that remain undefeated, with Milan and Internazionale both winning the FIFA Club World Cup in their sole appearances.

Performance of UEFA clubs
Year	Club	Method of qualification	Performance	Ref(s)
2000	(England) Manchester United (1/2)	Winners of the 1998–99 UEFA Champions League	Group stage	
2000	(Spain) Real Madrid (1/7)	Winners of the 1998 Intercontinental Cup	Fourth place	
2005	(England) Liverpool (1/2)	Winners of the 2004–05 UEFA Champions League	Runners-up	
2006	(Spain) Barcelona (1/4)	Winners of the 2005–06 UEFA Champions League	Runners-up	
2007	(Italy) Milan (1/1)	Winners of the 2006–07 UEFA Champions League	Champions	
2008	(England) Manchester United (2/2)	Winners of the 2007–08 UEFA Champions League	Champions	
2009	(Spain) Barcelona (2/4)	Winners of the 2008–09 UEFA Champions League	Champions	
2010	(Italy) Internazionale (1/2)	Winners of the 2009–10 UEFA Champions League	Champions	
2011	(Spain) Barcelona (3/4)	Winners of the 2010–11 UEFA Champions League	Champions	
2012	(England) Chelsea (1/3)	Winners of the 2011–12 UEFA Champions League	Runners-up	
2013	(Germany) Bayern Munich (1/3)	Winners of the 2012–13 UEFA Champions League	Champions	
2014	(Spain) Real Madrid (2/7)	Winners of the 2013–14 UEFA Champions League	Champions	
2015	(Spain) Barcelona (4/4)	Winners of the 2014–15 UEFA Champions League	Champions	
2016	(Spain) Real Madrid (3/7)	Winners of the 2015–16 UEFA Champions League	Champions	
2017	(Spain) Real Madrid (4/7)	Winners of the 2016–17 UEFA Champions League	Champions	
2018	(Spain) Real Madrid (5/7)	Winners of the 2017–18 UEFA Champions League	Champions	
2019	(England) Liverpool (2/2)	Winners of the 2018–19 UEFA Champions League	Champions	
2020	(Germany) Bayern Munich (2/3)	Winners of the 2019–20 UEFA Champions League	Champions	
2021	(England) Chelsea (2/3)	Winners of the 2020–21 UEFA Champions League	Champions	
2022	(Spain) Real Madrid (6/7)	Winners of the 2021–22 UEFA Champions League	Champions	
2023	(England) Manchester City (1/2)	Winners of the 2022–23 UEFA Champions League	Champions	
2025	(England) Chelsea (3/3)	Winners of the 2020–21 UEFA Champions League	Champions	
2025	(Spain) Real Madrid (7/7)	Winners of the 2021–22 UEFA Champions League	Semifinals	
2025	(England) Manchester City (2/2)	Winners of the 2022–23 UEFA Champions League	Round of 16	
2025	(Germany) Bayern Munich (3/3)	UEFA 4-year ranking	Quarterfinals	
2025	(France) Paris Saint-Germain (1/1)	UEFA 4-year ranking	Runners-up	
2025	(Italy) Internazionale (2/2)	UEFA 4-year ranking	Round of 16	
2025	(Portugal) Porto (1/1)	UEFA 4-year ranking	Group stage	
2025	(Portugal) Benfica (1/1)	UEFA 4-year ranking	Round of 16	
2025	(Germany) Borussia Dortmund (1/1)	UEFA 4-year ranking	Quarterfinals	
2025	(Italy) Juventus (1/1)	UEFA 4-year ranking	Round of 16	
2025	(Spain) Atlético Madrid (1/1)	UEFA 4-year ranking	Group stage	
2025	(Austria) Red Bull Salzburg (1/1)	UEFA 4-year ranking	Group stage	

== List of participating clubs of the FIFA Club World Cup ==
The following is a list of clubs that have played in or qualified for the FIFA Club World Cup. Editions in bold indicate competitions won. Rows can be adjusted to national league, total number of participations by national league or club and years played. Auckland City have contested the FIFA Club World Cup twelve times, more than any other club.

List of participant clubs
Nation	No.	Clubs	Years
Brazil (11)	4	Flamengo	2019, 2022, 2025, 2029
Brazil (11)	3	Palmeiras	2020, 2021, 2025
Brazil (11)	2	Corinthians	**2000**, **2012**
Brazil (11)	2	Internacional	**2006**, 2010
Brazil (11)	2	Fluminense	2023, 2025
Brazil (11)	1	Vasco da Gama	2000
Brazil (11)	1	São Paulo	**2005**
Brazil (11)	1	Santos	2011
Brazil (11)	1	Atlético Mineiro	2013
Brazil (11)	1	Grêmio	2017
Brazil (11)	1	Botafogo	2025
Mexico (9)	6	Monterrey	2011, 2012, 2013, 2019, 2021, 2025
Mexico (9)	5	Pachuca	2007, 2008, 2010, 2017, 2025
Mexico (9)	3	América	2006, 2015, 2016
Mexico (9)	2	Cruz Azul	2014, 2029
Mexico (9)	1	Necaxa	2000
Mexico (9)	1	Atlante	2009
Mexico (9)	1	Guadalajara	2018
Mexico (9)	1	UANL	2020
Mexico (9)	1	León	2023
Japan (5)	4	Urawa Red Diamonds	2007, 2017, 2023, 2025
Japan (5)	2	Sanfrecce Hiroshima	2012, 2015
Japan (5)	2	Kashima Antlers	2016, 2018
Japan (5)	1	Gamba Osaka	2008
Japan (5)	1	Kashiwa Reysol	2011
England (4)
England (4)	3	Chelsea	2012, **2021**, **2025**
England (4)	2	Manchester United	2000, **2008**
England (4)	2	Liverpool	2005, **2019**
England (4)	2	Manchester City	**2023**, 2025
Saudi Arabia (4)	4	Al-Hilal	2019, 2021, 2022, 2025
Saudi Arabia (4)	2	Al-Ittihad	2005, 2023
Saudi Arabia (4)	1	Al-Nassr	2000
Saudi Arabia (4)	1	Al-Ahli	2029
South Korea (4)	3	Ulsan HD (Note: As Ulsan Hyundai in 2012 and 2020)	2012, 2020, 2025
South Korea (4)	2	Jeonbuk Hyundai Motors	2006, 2016
South Korea (4)	1	Pohang Steelers	2009
South Korea (4)	1	Seongnam FC (Note: As Seongnam Ilhwa Chunma in 2010)	2010
Argentina (4)	3	River Plate	2015, 2018, 2025
Argentina (4)	2	Boca Juniors	2007, 2025
Argentina (4)	1	Estudiantes	2009
Argentina (4)	1	San Lorenzo	2014
United Arab Emirates (4)	2	Al-Jazira	2017, 2021
United Arab Emirates (4)	2	Al-Ain	2018, 2025
United Arab Emirates (4)	1	Shabab Al-Ahli (Note: As Al-Ahli in 2009)	2009
United Arab Emirates (4)	1	Al-Wahda	2010
Australia (4)	1	South Melbourne	2000
Australia (4)	1	Sydney FC	2005
Australia (4)	1	Adelaide United	2008
Australia (4)	1	Western Sydney Wanderers	2014
New Zealand (3)	12	Auckland City	2006, 2009, 2011, 2012, 2013, 2014, 2015, 2016, 2017, 2022, 2023, 2025
New Zealand (3)	2	Waitakere United	2007, 2008
New Zealand (3)	1	Team Wellington	2018
Spain (3)	7	Real Madrid	2000, **2014**, **2016**, **2017**, **2018**, **2022**, 2025
Spain (3)	4	Barcelona	2006, **2009**, **2011**, **2015**
Spain (3)	1	Atlético Madrid	2025
Morocco (3)	3	Wydad Casablanca	2017, 2022, 2025
Morocco (3)	2	Raja Casablanca	2000, 2013
Morocco (3)	1	Moghreb Tétouan	2014
Italy (3)	2	Internazionale	**2010**, 2025
Italy (3)	1	Milan	**2007**
Italy (3)	1	Juventus	2025
United States (3)	2	Seattle Sounders FC	2022, 2025
United States (3)	1	Inter Miami CF	2025
United States (3)	1	Los Angeles FC	2025
Egypt (2)	10	Al Ahly	2005, 2006, 2008, 2012, 2013, 2020, 2021, 2022, 2023, 2025
Egypt (2)	1	Pyramids	2029
Tunisia (2)	4	Espérance de Tunis	2011, 2018, 2019, 2025
Tunisia (2)	1	Étoile du Sahel	2007
Germany (2)	3	Bayern Munich	**2013**, **2020**, 2025
Germany (2)	1	Borussia Dortmund	2025
Qatar (2)	2	Al-Sadd	2011, 2019
Qatar (2)	1	Al-Duhail	2020
Portugal (2)	1	Benfica	2025
Portugal (2)	1	Porto	2025
(Democratic Republic of the Congo) DR Congo (1)	3	TP Mazembe	2009, 2010, 2015
South Africa (1)	3	Mamelodi Sundowns	2016, 2025, 2029
China (1)	2	Guangzhou (Note: As Guangzhou Evergrande in 2013 and 2015)	2013, 2015
France (1)	2	Paris Saint-Germain	2025, 2029
Costa Rica (1)	1	Saprissa	2005
Iran (1)	1	Sepahan	2007
Ecuador (1)	1	LDU Quito	2008
Papua New Guinea (1)	1	Hekari United	2010
Algeria (1)	1	ES Sétif	2014
Colombia (1)	1	Atlético Nacional	2016
New Caledonia (1)	1	Hienghène Sport	2019
(French Polynesia) Tahiti (1)	1	AS Pirae	2021
Austria (1)	1	Red Bull Salzburg	2025
