= Mike Saofaiga =

Samoan footballer

Personal information
- Full name: Mike Saofaiga Foai
- Date of birth: January 12, 1991 (age 35)
- Place of birth: Vaiala, Samoa
- Height: 1.79 m (5 ft 10 in)
- Position: Forward

Team information
- Current team: Kiwi FC
- Number: 12

Senior career*
Years	Team	Apps	(Gls)
2011–	Kiwi FC	41	(16)

International career^{‡}
2011–	Samoa	10	(0)
- * Club domestic league appearances and goals ‡ National team caps and goals as of 18 July 2019

Mike Saofaiga Foai (born 12 January 1991) is a Samoan footballer who plays as a forward for the Samoa national football team and Kiwi FC.

Saofaiga was born in Vaiala. He played for Vailima Kiwi FC in the 2016 OFC Champions League.

He was selected for the Samoa national football team for the 2016 OFC Nations Cup. He was named to the squad for the 2019 Pacific Games.
