= 2015 Fiji National Football League =

- Season: 2015
- Champions: Nadi F.C. (9th title)
- Relegated: Tailevu Naitasiri FC

The 2015 Fiji National Football League was the 39th season of the Fiji National Football League organized by the Fiji Football Association since its establishment in 1977.

== Standings ==
Pos	Team	Pld	W	D	L	GF	GA	GD	Pts	Qualification or relegation
1	Nadi FC (C)	14	11	2	1	30	11	+19	35	2016 OFC Champions League Group Stage
2	Suva FC	14	7	4	3	23	12	+11	25	2016 OFC Champions League Group Stage
3	Rewa FC	14	7	2	5	22	18	+4	23	
4	Lautoka FC	14	7	1	6	24	18	+6	22	
5	Ba FC	14	6	3	5	35	17	+18	21	
6	Labasa FC	14	5	4	5	14	17	−3	19	
7	Nadroga FC	14	4	1	9	13	29	−16	13	
8	Tailevu Naitasiri (R)	14	0	1	13	7	46	−39	1	Relegation to the 2016 Fiji Senior League

Updated to match(es) played on 4 July 2015. Source: Soccerway
Rules for classification: 1) points; 2) goal difference; 3) number of goals scored.
(C) Champions; (R) Relegated
