= Taumihau Tiatia =

Tahitian footballer (born 1991)

Personal information
- Date of birth: 25 July 1991 (age 35)
- Place of birth: Mahina, Tahiti
- Height: 1.80 m (5 ft 11 in)
- Position: Defender

Team information
- Current team: A.S. Pirae
- Number: 2

Senior career*
Years	Team	Apps	(Gls)
2009–2014	Wasquehal		
2014–2024	A.S. Tefana		
2024-	A.S. Pirae		

International career^{‡}
2016–	Tahiti	4	(0)
Medal record
Men's football
Representing Tahiti
OFC Nations Cup
Third place	2024 Fiji/Vanuatu
- * Club domestic league appearances and goals as of 1 March 2024 ‡ National team caps and goals as of 1 March 2024

Taumihau Tiatia (born 25 July 1991) is a Tahitian footballer who plays as a defender for A.S. Pirae in the Tahiti Ligue 1.

== Honours ==
- OFC Nations Cup: 3rd place 2024
