= Stade Théophile Hoarau =

Multi-use stadium in Saint-Louis

Coordinates: 21°17′16″S 55°24′14″E

- Interactive map of Stade Théophile Hoarau
- Full name: Stade d'Honneur Théophile Hoarau
- Location: Saint-Louis, Réunion
- Owner: R. Mondon Complex
- Capacity: 2,875
- Surface: Grass
- Field size: 8,000 m2

Construction
- Opened: 1945

Tenant
- SS Saint-Louisienne

Stade Théophile Hoarau is a multi-use stadium in Saint-Louis, Réunion. It is currently used mostly for football matches and serves as the home stadium for SS Saint-Louisienne. The stadium was founded in 1945 and it holds 2,875 people.
