= Tunoa Tevaerai =

Tahitian footballer (born 1992)

Personal information
- Date of birth: 18 June 1992 (age 34)
- Place of birth: Tahiti
- Position: Midfielder

Team information
- Current team: Tefana

Senior career*
Years	Team	Apps	(Gls)
2012–	Tefana		

International career^{‡}
2016–	Tahiti	4	(0)
- * Club domestic league appearances and goals as of 18:02, 4 June 2017 (UTC) ‡ National team caps and goals as of 18:02, 4 June 2017 (UTC)

Tunoa Tevaerai (born 18 June 1992) is a Tahitian footballer who plays as a midfielder. He comes out for the Tahitian team AS Tefana and the Tahitian national football team.

== Career ==
=== International ===
Tevaerai made his first senior international appearance in a 2018 FIFA World Cup qualifier against the Solomon Islands on 8 November 2016, having substituted Tefai Faehau-Heitaa in the 72nd minute.

== Honours ==
Tefana

Tahiti First Division (2): 2014–15, 2015–16
