= Harlem Simiona =

New Zealand footballer

Personal information
- Full name: Harlem Simiona
- Date of birth: 3 September 1992 (age 34)
- Place of birth: Rotorua, New Zealand
- Height: 1.79 m (5 ft 10 in)
- Position: Forward

Team information
- Current team: Ngongotaha

Senior career*
Years	Team	Apps	(Gls)
2013–2015	Ngongotaha		
2015–	Tupapa Maraerenga		
2017	Puaikura		
2017–	Ngongotaha		

International career^{‡}
2015–	Cook Islands	3	(0)
- * Club domestic league appearances and goals as of 2 September 2015 ‡ National team caps and goals as of 4 September 2015

Harlem Simiona (born 3 September 1992) is a New Zealand born footballer with heritage from the Cook Islands, who plays as a forward for Ngongotaha as well as the Cook Islands national football team.

== Career ==
=== International ===
Simiona qualified to represent the Cook Islands through his grandfather, receiving his first call up to the squad in August 2015, for the 2018 FIFA World Cup qualification matches against American Samoa, Samoa and Tonga.

== Career statistics ==
=== International ===
Cook Islands
Year	Apps	Goals
2015	3	0
Total	3	0

Statistics accurate as of match played 4 September 2015
