= 1999 CAF Champions League =

Tournament details
- Dates: 31 January – 12 December
- Teams: 41 (from 41 associations)

Final positions
- Champions: (Morocco) Raja Casablanca (3rd title)
- Runners-up: (Tunisia) ES Tunis

Tournament statistics
- Matches played: 88
- Goals scored: 233 (2.65 per match)

The 1999 CAF Champions League was the 35th awarding of Africa's premier club football tournament organized by the Confederation of African Football (CAF), and the 3rd prize under the CAF Champions League format. Raja Casablanca of Morocco defeated ES Tunis of Tunisia on penalties in the final to win their third title.

== Qualifying rounds ==
=== Preliminary round ===
Team 1	Agg.	Team 2	1st leg	2nd leg
Red Sea FC (Eritrea)	1–3	(Rwanda) Rayon Sport	1–1	0–2
ASEC Ndiambour (Senegal)	6–0	(Liberia) Invincible Eleven	4–0	2–0 (Note: Invincible Eleven withdrew after 1st leg, and 2nd leg was awarded 2–0 to ASEC Ndiambour.)
USFA (Burkina Faso)	2–1	(Benin) Dragons de l'Ouémé	2–0	0–1
CD Elá Nguema (Equatorial Guinea)	w/o (Note: Santana FC withdrew)	(São Tomé and Príncipe) Santana FC	–	–
Telecom Wanderers (Malawi)	3–2	(Mauritius) Scouts Club	0–1	3–1
SS Saint-Louisienne (Réunion)	6–0	(Seychelles) Red Star FC	2–0	4–0
AS CotonTchad (Chad)	2–3	(Libya) Al-Mahalah	2–0	0–3
Notwane FC (Botswana)	2–4	(Lesotho) LDF	1–1	1–3
Real Banjul (The Gambia)	1–3	(Guinea) AS Kaloum Star	0–2	1–1

=== First round ===
Team 1	Agg.	Team 2	1st leg	2nd leg
Maji Maji FC (Tanzania)	0–5	(Egypt) Al Ahly	0–3	0–2
Rayon Sport (Rwanda)	3–1	(Kenya) AFC Leopards	2–1	1–0
ASEC Ndiambour (Senegal)	1–4	(Morocco) Raja Casablanca	1–0	0–4
Djoliba AC (Mali)	3–3 (a)	(Cameroon) Coton Sport FC	2–0	1–3
FC 105 Libreville (Gabon)	2–3	(Ivory Coast) ASEC Mimosas	1–0	1–3
USFA (Burkina Faso)	2–6	(Algeria) USM El Harrach	2–0	0–6
CD Elá Nguema (Equatorial Guinea)	0–9	(Ghana) Hearts of Oak	0–3	0–6
SC Villa (Uganda)	7–2	(Ethiopia) Mebrat Hail	5–0	2–2
AS Kaloum Star (Guinea)	3–6	(Nigeria) Shooting Stars	3–0	0–6
Costa do Sol (Mozambique)	0–1	(Democratic Republic of the Congo) DC Motema Pembe	0–1	(Note: Costa do Sol departed before 2nd leg and were ejected from the competition.)
Telecom Wanderers (Malawi)	1–5	(South Africa) Mamelodi Sundowns	1–2	0–3
SS Saint-Louisienne (Réunion)	2–1	(Madagascar) DSA Antananarivo	1–0	1–1
Al-Mahalah (Libya)	1–4	(Tunisia) ES Tunis	1–2	0–2
Nchanga Rangers (Zambia)	1–2	(Sudan) Al-Hilal	1–0	0–2
Vital'O (Burundi)	3–2	(Angola) Primeiro de Agosto	2–1	1–1
LDF (Lesotho)	0–4	(Zimbabwe) Dynamos Harare	0–3	0–1

=== Second round ===
Team 1	Agg.	Team 2	1st leg	2nd leg
Al Ahly (Egypt)	3–1	(Rwanda) Rayon Sport	3–0	0–1
Raja Casablanca (Morocco)	3–3 (7–6 p)	(Mali) Djoliba AC	2–1	1–2
ASEC Mimosas (Ivory Coast)	5–2	(Algeria) USM El Harrach	4–0	1–2
Hearts of Oak (Ghana)	4–1	(Uganda) SC Villa	3–0	1–1
Shooting Stars (Nigeria)	2–0	(Democratic Republic of the Congo) DC Motema Pembe	2–0	0–0 (Note: The match was abandoned at half-time with the score tied at 0–0 after Shooting Stars FC left the pitch and refused to continue due to their team officials having been manhandled and assaulted by local fans; they were awarded the tie.)
Mamelodi Sundowns (South Africa)	3–5	(Réunion) SS Saint-Louisienne	1–1	2–4
ES Tunis (Tunisia)	8–3	(Sudan) Al-Hilal	5–0	3–3
Vital'O (Burundi)	0–3	(Zimbabwe) Dynamos Harare	0–2	0–1

== Group stage ==
Key to colors in group tables
Group winners advance to the Knockout stage

=== Group A ===
Pos	Team	Pld	W	D	L	GF	GA	GD	Pts	Qualification	RAJ	ALA	HEA	SHO
1	(Morocco) Raja Casablanca	6	3	2	1	4	2	+2	11	Final	—	1–1	1–0	1–0
2	(Egypt) Al Ahly	6	3	1	2	11	7	+4	10		0–1	—	2–0	4–1
3	(Ghana) Hearts of Oak	6	2	2	2	7	6	+1	8		0–0	2–1	—	3–0
4	(Nigeria) Shooting Stars	6	1	1	4	6	13	−7	4		1–0	2–3	2–2	—

=== Group B ===
Pos	Team	Pld	W	D	L	GF	GA	GD	Pts	Qualification	ESP	MIM	DYN	SLO
1	(Tunisia) ES Tunis	6	5	0	1	13	1	+12	15	Final	—	3–0	1–0	5–0
2	(Ivory Coast) ASEC Mimosas	6	3	1	2	7	6	+1	10		1–0	—	2–0	3–1
3	(Zimbabwe) Dynamos Harare	6	2	0	4	9	9	0	6		0–2	2–1	—	7–2
4	(Réunion) SS Saint-Louisienne	6	1	1	4	4	17	−13	4		0–2	0–0	1–0	—

== Final ==
27 November 1999
17:00 UTC+1

Raja Casablanca (Morocco)	0–0	(Tunisia) ES Tunis

Stade Père Jégo, Casablanca
Attendance: 10,000
Referee: Mathabella Petros (South Africa)
12 December 1999
17:00 UTC+1

ES Tunis (Tunisia)	0–0	(Morocco) Raja Casablanca
Penalties
Badra (penalty scored); Kanzari (penalty missed); Gabsi (penalty scored); Chihi (penalty scored); El Ouaer (penalty missed)	3–4	(penalty scored) Khoubache; (penalty scored) El Karkouri; (penalty missed) Safri; (penalty scored) Aboub; (penalty scored) El Himer

Stade El Menzah, Tunis
Attendance: 50,000
Referee: Manuel Monteiro Duarte (Cape Verde)

== Top goal scorers ==
The top scorers from the 1999 CAF Champions League are as follows:

Rank	Name	Team	Goals
1	(Egypt) Hossam Hassan	(Egypt) Al Ahly	6
2	(Ghana) Ishmael Addo	(Ghana) Hearts of Oak	4
2	(Ivory Coast) Aruna Dindane	(Ivory Coast) ASEC Mimosas	4
2	(Ivory Coast) Venance Zézé	(Ivory Coast) ASEC Mimosas	4
2	(Morocco) Mustapha Moustawdaa	(Morocco) Raja Casablanca	4
2	(Tunisia) Walid Azaiez	(Tunisia) ES Tunis	4
7	(Egypt) Mohamed Gouda	(Egypt) Al Ahly	3
7	(Ghana) Emmanuel Osei Kuffour	(Ghana) Hearts of Oak	3
7	(Zimbabwe) Kingston Rinemhota	(Zimbabwe) Dynamos Harare	3
7	(Zimbabwe) Ronald Sibanda	(Zimbabwe) Dynamos Harare	3
