= AS Saint-Louisienne =

Association football club in Réunion

- Full name: Association Sportive; Saint-Louisienne
- Short name: ASSL
- Founded: 1936
- Ground: Stade Théophile Hoarau, Saint-Louis, Réunion
- Capacity: 2,500
- League: Réunion Premier League
- 2025: Réunion Premier League, 10th
Home colours

Association Sportive Saint-Louisienne, commonly known as AS Saint-Louisienne, or simply as ASSL, is a football club from Saint-Louis, Réunion Island. The club plays their home matches at Stade Théophile Hoarau, which has a maximum capacity of 2,500 people.

== Achievements ==
- Réunion Premier League: 16

1958, 1963, 1964, 1965, 1966, 1967, 1968, 1969, 1970, 1982, 1988, 1997, 1998, 2001, 2002, 2012.

- Coupe de la Réunion: 13

1964, 1968, 1969, 1970, 1981, 1987, 1995, 1996, 1998, 1999, 2002, 2013, 2021.

- Coupe D.O.M.: 4

1989, 1998, 1999, 2002

- Coupe D.O.M.–T.O.M.: 2

2000, 2003

== Performance in CAF competitions ==
- CAF Champions League: 5 appearances

1998 – Preliminary Round
1999 – Group Stage (Top 8)
2002 – First Round
2003 – First Round
2017 – First Round

- CAF Cup Winners' Cup: 3 appearances

1996 – First Round
1997 – Semi-finals
2000 – Semi-finals

== The club in the French football structure ==
- Coupe de France: 6 appearances

1994–95, 1995–96, 1996–97, 1997–98, 2002–03, 2014–15

Ties won
Year	Round	Home team (tier)	Score	Away team (tier)
1994–95	Round 7	SAS Épinal (3)	1–3	Saint-Louisienne
1994–95	Round 8	Saint-Louisienne	1–1 (a.e.t.) (4–2 p)	Chamois Niortais (2)
1995–96	Round 7	Saint-Louisienne	1–0	La Roche-sur-Yon VF (3)
1997–98	Round 7	Saint-Louisienne	2–1	La Roche-sur-Yon VF (4)
2014–15	Round 7	GSI Pontivy (4)	2–2 (a.e.t.) (4–5 p)	Saint-Louisienne
