= Zakaria Aboub =

Moroccan footballer and coach (born 1980)

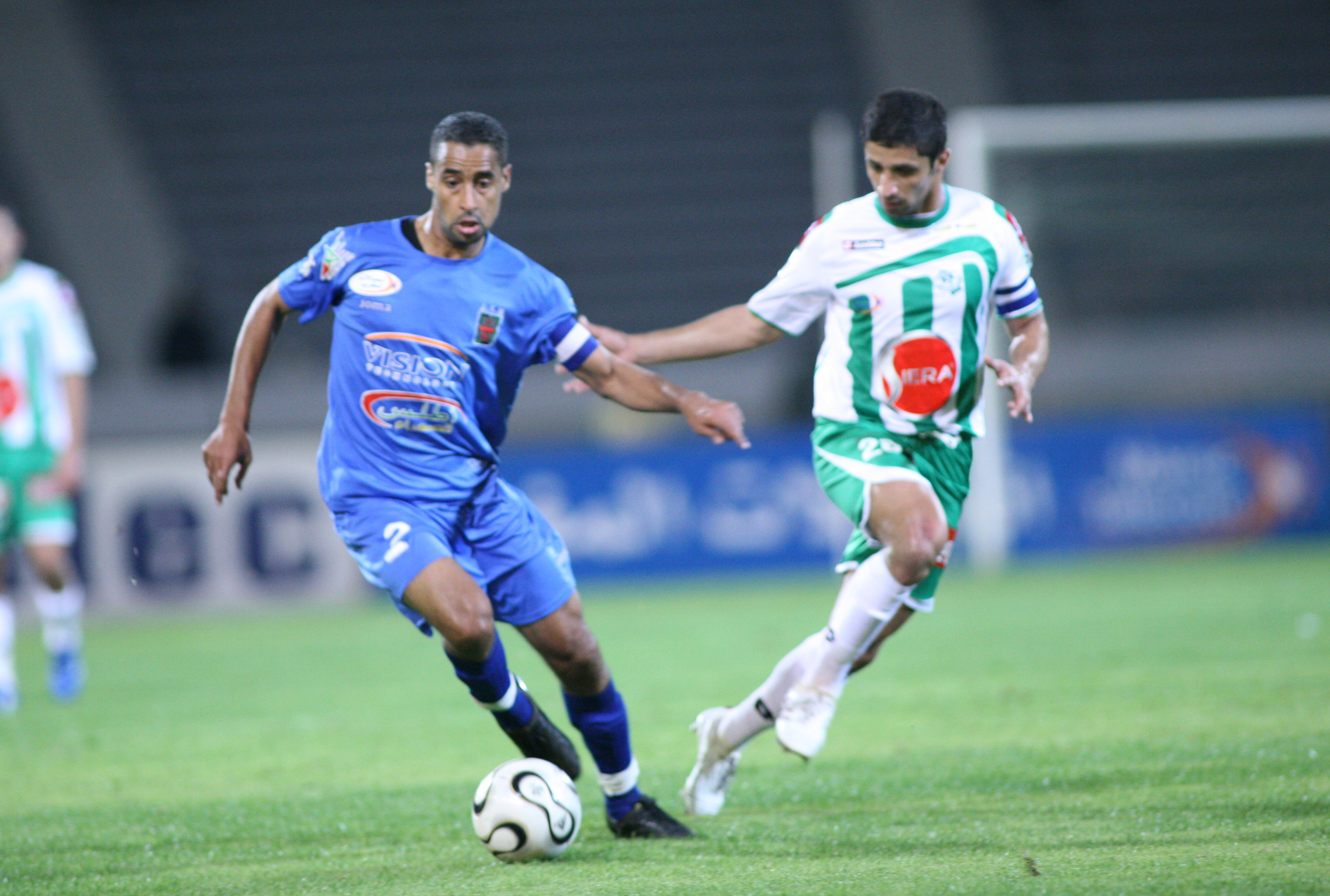
- Aboub (right) in 2009

Personal information
- Date of birth: 3 June 1980 (age 46)
- Place of birth: Casablanca, Morocco
- Height: 1.73 m (5 ft 8 in)
- Position: Midfielder

Team information
- Current team: Difaâ Hassani El Jadidi (manager)

Senior career*
Years	Team	Apps	(Gls)
1999–2002	Raja Casablanca		
2002–2003	Al-Dhafra		
2003–2004	FAR Rabat		
2004–2005	Wydad Casablanca		
2005–2006	Al-Sharjah		
2006–2007	FC Istres	20	(0)
2007–2009	Difaâ El Jadidi		
2009–2010	Raja Casablanca	3	(0)
2010	Al-Muharraq		

International career
- Morocco Olympics
2004–2007	Morocco	8	(0)
- * Club domestic league appearances and goals

Zakaria Aboub (Arabic: زكرياء عبوب; born 3 June 1980) is a Moroccan professional football manager, who currently coaches Botola club Difaâ Hassani El Jadidi.

== Club career ==
He joined FC Istres in January 2006.

== International career ==
Aboub played in the U-23 internationals for Morocco in the 2000 Summer Olympics.
