= 2021 OFC U-20 Championship =

Tournament details
- Host country: Samoa
- Dates: Cancelled
- Teams: 11 (from 1 confederation)

The 2021 OFC U-20 Championship, originally to be held as the 2020 OFC U-19 Championship, was originally to be the 23rd edition of the OFC U-19/U-20 Championship, the biennial international youth football championship organised by the Oceania Football Confederation (OFC) for the men's under-19/under-20 national teams of Oceania.

The tournament was originally scheduled to be held in the Samoa in July 2020. However, on 14 May 2020, the OFC announced that the tournament had been postponed due to the COVID-19 pandemic, and would not be held before October 2020 but no later than January 2021. On 28 July 2020, the OFC announced that the tournament would be held in January 2021, provisionally between 23 January and 7 February 2021, with the name of the tournament changed from "2020 OFC U-19 Championship" to "2021 OFC U-20 Championship". The OFC announced on 5 November 2020 that a decision on the tournament would be made during the Executive Committee meeting in December. On 16 December 2020, the OFC announced the tournament had been postponed indefinitely until confirmation had been received from FIFA about the status of the 2021 FIFA U-20 World Cup in Indonesia, scheduled for May–June 2021, of which the top two teams of the tournament would have qualified for as the OFC representatives.

Following FIFA's decision to cancel the 2021 FIFA U-20 World Cup on 24 December 2020, the OFC announced on 18 January 2021 that the tournament would remain on track to be held in 2021, with the new dates to be decided in the coming months. However, on 4 March 2021, the OFC announced that the tournament had been cancelled, and Samoa would be retained to host the next edition in 2022.

New Zealand were the two-time defending champions.

== Teams ==
All 11 FIFA-affiliated national teams from the OFC were eligible to enter the tournament.

Starting from this edition, male youth tournaments would no longer have a four-team qualifying stage, and all teams would compete in one tournament.

Note: All appearance statistics include those in the qualifying stage (2016 and 2018).

Team	Appearance (planned)	Previous best performance
American Samoa	6th	Group stage (1998, 2011, 2014)
Cook Islands	4th	Group stage (2001, 2016)
Fiji	22nd	Champions (2014)
New Caledonia	13th	Runners-up (2008)
New Zealand	22nd	Champions (1980, 1992, 2007, 2011, 2013, 2016, 2018)
Papua New Guinea	15th	Fourth place (1978, 1982)
Samoa (hosts)	10th	Group stage (1988, 1994, 1998, 2001, 2002, 2005, 2007)
Solomon Islands	10th	Runners-up (2005, 2011)
Tahiti	12th	Champions (1974, 2008)
Tonga	7th	Group stage (1998, 2001, 2002, 2005, 2018)
Vanuatu	16th	Runners-up (2014, 2016)

== Squads ==
Players born on or after 1 January 2001 were eligible to compete in the tournament.
