= 2026 OFC U-19 Championship =

2026 OFC U-19 Men's Championship
2026 OFC U-19 siamupini

Tournament details
- Host countries: Qualifying stage: Cook Islands; Final tournament: Samoa
- Dates: Qualifying stage: 6–12 June 2026; Final tournament: 1–14 September 2026
- Teams: Final tournament: 8 Total: 10 (from 1 confederation)
- Venue: 1 (in 1 host city)

Final positions
- Champions: New Zealand (10th title)
- Runners-up: Tahiti
- Third place: Solomon Islands
- Fourth place: New Caledonia

Tournament statistics
- Matches played: 15
- Goals scored: 68 (4.53 per match)
- Attendance: 1,605 (107 per match)
- Top scorer: (Solomon Islands) Payroll Patty (5 goals)

The 2026 OFC U-19 Men's Championship is the 25th edition of the OFC U-19/U-20 Championship, the biennial international youth football championship organised by the Oceania Football Confederation (OFC) for the men's under-19/under-20 national teams of Oceania.

The top two teams of the tournament will qualify for the 2027 FIFA U-20 World Cup in Azerbaijan and Uzbekistan as the OFC representatives. New Zealand are the defending champions.

== Teams ==
All 11 FIFA-affiliated national teams from the OFC were eligible to enter the tournament.

Starting from 2022, this marked the return of the four-team qualifying stage after absent from 2022.

Note: All appearance statistics include those in the qualifying stage (2016, 2018 and 2024).

Team	Stage	App.	Previous best performance
Fiji	Final tournament (Group stage)	24th	Champions (2014)
New Zealand	Final tournament (Group stage)	24th	Champions (1980, 1992, 2007, 2011, 2013, 2016, 2018, 2022, 2024)
New Caledonia	Final tournament (Group stage)	15th	Runners-up (2008, 2024)
Samoa (hosts)	Final tournament (Group stage)	12th	Quarter-finals (2022)
Solomon Islands	Final tournament (Group stage)	12th	Runners-up (2005, 2011)
Tahiti	Final tournament (Group stage)	14th	Champions (1974, 2008)
Vanuatu	Final tournament (Group stage)	18th	Runners-up (2014, 2016)
Papua New Guinea	Qualifying stage	6th	Group stage (2001, 2016)
Cook Islands	Qualifying stage	6th	Group stage (2001, 2016)
Tonga	Qualifying stage	9th	Group stage (1998, 2001, 2002, 2005, 2018)

== Venues ==
Samoa
Apia
FFS Football Stadium
Capacity: 3,500
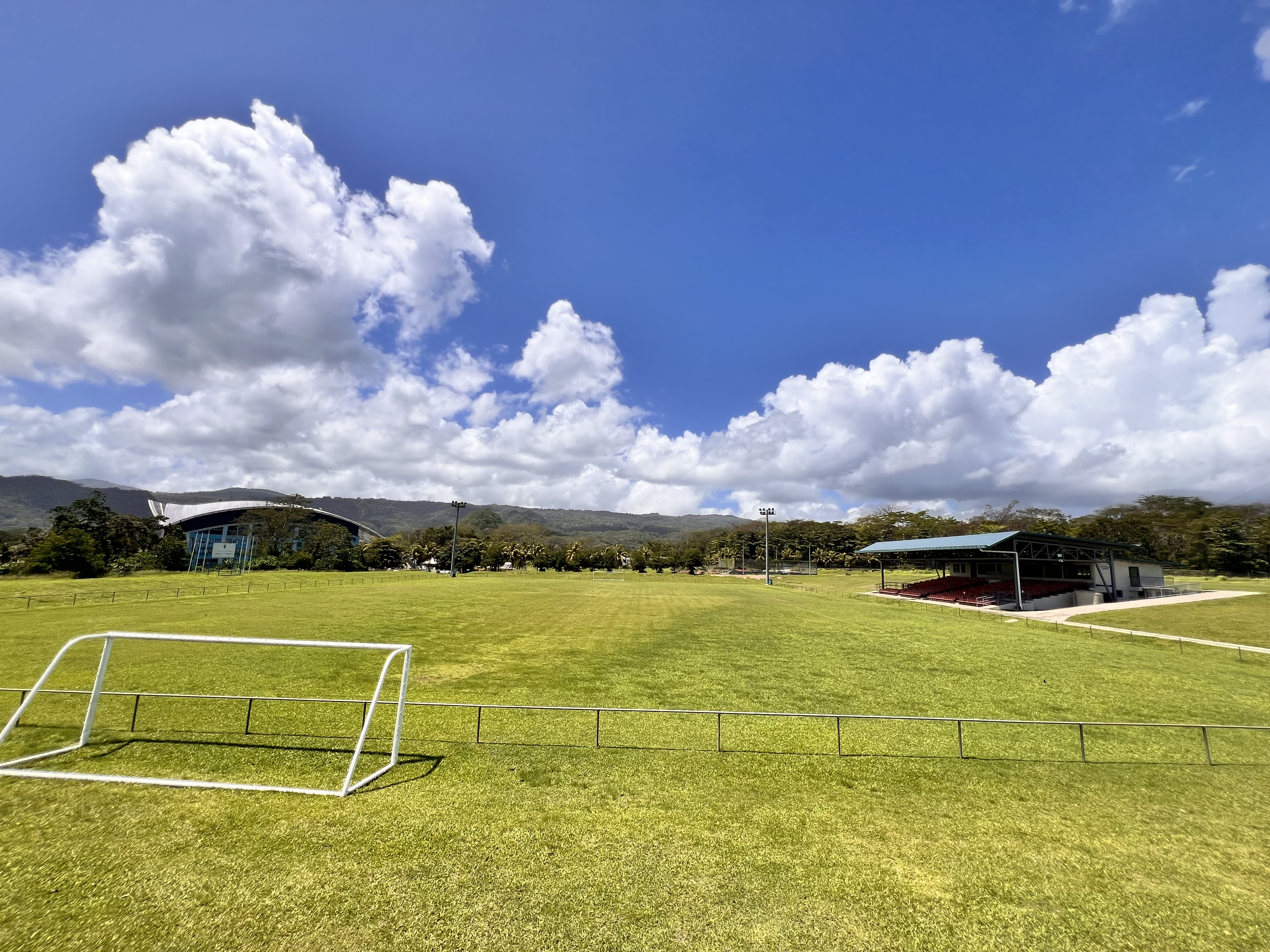

== Draw ==
The draw for the group stage was held on 25 February with teams seeded into pots based upon their ranking at the 2024 OFC U-19 Championship.

Pot 1	Pot 2	Pot 3
New Zealand; New Caledonia	Solomon Islands; Fiji; Tahiti; Samoa	Vanuatu; Qualifying Winner (Note: The identity of the qualifying winners was not known at the time of the final draw)

== Qualifying stage ==
The draw for the group stage was held 25 February 2026.

=== Tiebreakers ===
Tie-breaking criteria for group play
The ranking of teams in the group stage was determined as follows:
1. Total points;
2. Goal difference in all group matches;
3. Goals scored in all group matches;
4. Head-to-head result between tied teams;
  1. Points in matches among the tied teams;
  2. Goal difference in matches among the tied teams;
  3. Goals scored in matches among the tied teams;
5. Fair play points in all group matches (only one deduction per player, per match):
  - One yellow card: −1 point;
  - Two yellow cards (indirect red card): −3 points;
  - Direct red card: −4 points;
  - Yellow card and direct red card: −5 points;
6. Drawing of lots.

=== Qualifying group ===
Pos	Team	Pld	W	D	L	GF	GA	GD	Pts	Qualification	(Papua New Guinea)	(Cook Islands)	(Tonga)
1	Papua New Guinea	2	2	0	0	9	1	+8	6	Qualify for Final tournament	—	5–1	—
2	Cook Islands (H)	2	1	0	1	5	6	−1	3		—	—	—
3	Tonga	2	0	0	2	1	8	−7	0		0–4	1–4	—

Updated to match(es) played on 6 June 2026. Source: OFC
(H) Hosts

== Group stage ==
All times are local, WST (UTC+13).

=== Group A ===
Pos	Team	Pld	W	D	L	GF	GA	GD	Pts	Qualification
1	Solomon Islands	3	3	0	0	6	1	+5	9	Knockout stage
2	New Caledonia	3	2	0	1	12	5	+7	6	Knockout stage
3	Papua New Guinea	3	1	0	2	4	10	−6	3	5th place match
4	Samoa (H)	3	0	0	3	4	10	−6	0	7th place match

Updated to match(es) played on 4 September 2026. Source: OFC
(H) Hosts
1 September 2026
11:00

Solomon Islands	1–0	Papua New Guinea
Siosi 16'	Report

FFS Football Stadium (Field 1), Apia
Attendance: 80
Referee: Arnold Tari (Vanuatu)
1 September 2026
15:00

New Caledonia	4–2	Samoa
Wamowe 2'; Iopue 9'; Wiako 20'; Thupako 48'	Report	Afamasaga 51'; Arratia-pio 72'

FFS Football Stadium (Field 1), Apia
Attendance: 500
Referee: Chris Bennett (New Zealand)

4 September 2026
11:00

New Caledonia	1–3	Solomon Islands
Siwoine 43'	Report	Patty 36', 45+3', 74'

FFS Football Stadium (Field 1), Apia
Attendance: 55
Referee: Chris Bennett (New Zealand)
4 September 2026
15:00

Papua New Guinea	4–2	Samoa
Rani 39'; Tita 44'; Ima 49'; Moses 55'	Report	Afamasaga 17'; Scanlan 47'

FFS Football Stadium (Field 1), Apia
Attendance: 200
Referee: Arnold Tari (Vanuatu)

7 September 2026
11:00

Papua New Guinea	0–7	New Caledonia
	Report	Qaeze 15'; Diko 40' (pen.); Siwoine 43', 80'; Toto 45'; Lages 90'; Ijelipa 90+2'

FFS Football Stadium (Field 1), Apia
Attendance: 50
Referee: Calvin Berg (New Zealand)
7 September 2026
15:00

Samoa	0–2	Solomon Islands
	Report	Patty 20', 90'

FFS Football Stadium (Field 1), Apia
Attendance: 300
Referee: Tellos Kaufusi (Tonga)

=== Group B ===
Pos	Team	Pld	W	D	L	GF	GA	GD	Pts	Qualification
1	New Zealand	3	3	0	0	16	0	+16	9	Knockout stage
2	Tahiti	3	1	1	1	3	10	−7	4	Knockout stage
3	Fiji	3	1	0	2	8	6	+2	3	5th place match
4	Vanuatu	3	0	1	2	3	14	−11	1	7th place match

Updated to match(es) played on 5 September 2026. Source: OFC
2 September 2026
11:00

Fiji	7–2	Vanuatu
Khairati 26'; Afazal 46'; Uqe 57'; Naresh 67', 71', 77'; Franklin 90+7'	Report	Masauvakalo 15'; Taravaki 90+3'

FFS Football Stadium (Field 2), Apia
Attendance: 35
Referee: Ben Aukwai (Solomon Islands)
2 September 2026
15:00

New Zealand	8–0	Tahiti
Martin 8'; Cartwright 37'; Hill 40'; Smith 45+3'; Grosso 60'; Fitzharris 72', 86'; Henry 75'	Report

FFS Football Stadium (Field 2), Apia
Attendance: 60
Referee: David Yareboinen (Papua New Guinea)

5 September 2026
11:00

Vanuatu	1–1	Tahiti
Hariri 56'	Report	Scavazza 89'

FFS Football Stadium (Field 2), Apia
Referee: Kyllian Lelarge (New Caledonia)
5 September 2026
15:00

New Zealand	2–0	Fiji
Ferguson 54'; Grosso 79'	Report

FFS Football Stadium (Field 2), Apia
Attendance: 60
Referee: David Yareboinen (Papua New Guinea)

8 September 2026
12:00

Tahiti	2–1	Fiji
Jamet 40+7'; Bohl 86' (pen.)	Report	Khairati 90+13'

FFS Football Stadium (Field 2), Apia
Attendance: 50
Referee: David Yareboinen (Papua New Guinea)
8 September 2026
15:00

Vanuatu	0–6	New Zealand
	Report	Sloane-Rodrigues 35'; Grosso 45'; Ferguson 50', 56', 76'; Hill 71'

FFS Football Stadium (Field 2), Apia
Attendance: 50
Referee: Peter Olomaga (Samoa)

== 5th place match ==
12 September 2026
11:00

Papua New Guinea	4–0	Fiji
Moses 6'; Eugene 23', 67'; Millis 45'	Report

FFS Football Stadium (Field 2), Apia
Attendance: 35
Referee: Arnold Tari (Vanuatu)

== 7th place match ==
12 September 2026
15:00

Samoa	3–1	Vanuatu
Scanlan 77', 82', 90'	Report	Takaro 90'

FFS Football Stadium (Field 2), Apia
Attendance: 85
Referee: Chris Bennett (New Zealand)

== Knockout stage ==
=== Bracket ===
Semi-finals
11 September – Apia
Solomon Islands	1
Tahiti	2
11 September – Apia
New Zealand	6
New Caledonia	1

Final
14 September – Apia
Tahiti	0
New Zealand	2
Third place match
14 September – Apia
Solomon Islands	1
New Caledonia	0

=== Semi-finals ===
Winners qualified for 2027 FIFA U-20 World Cup.

11 September 2026
11:00

Solomon Islands	1–2	Tahiti
Sihiu 90'	Report	Ruiz 61'; Teaha 80'

FFS Football Stadium (Field 1), Apia
Attendance: 45
Referee: Calvin Berg (New Zealand)
11 September 2026
15:00

New Zealand	6–1	New Caledonia
Hill 23', 50'; Lienard 43'; Sloane-Rodrigues 53'; Martin 64'; Grosso 90+4'	Report	Katrawa 70' (pen.)

FFS Football Stadium (Field 1), Apia
Referee: Ben Aukwai (Solomon Islands)

=== 3rd place match ===
14 September 2026
11:00

Solomon Islands	1–0	New Caledonia
	Report

FFS Football Stadium (Field 1), Apia

=== Final ===
14 September 2026
15:00

Tahiti	0–2	New Zealand
	Report	Dieulangard 45' (o.g.); Hill 79'

FFS Football Stadium (Field 1), Apia
Attendance: 60
Referee: Ben Aukwai (Solomon Islands)

== Qualified teams for FIFA U-20 World Cup ==
The following two teams from OFC qualified for the 2027 FIFA U-20 World Cup in Azerbaijan and Uzbekistan.

Team	Qualified on	Previous appearances in FIFA U-20 World Cup^{1}
New Zealand	11 September 2026	8 (2007, 2011, 2013, 2015, 2017, 2019, 2023, 2025)
Tahiti	11 September 2026	2 (2009, 2019)

^{1} Bold indicates champions for that year. Italic indicates hosts for that year.

== Broadcasting ==
All games were being streamed on FIFA+.
