= 2022 OFC U-19 Championship =

Championnat d'Océanie de football des moins de 19 ans 2022

Tournament details
- Host country: Tahiti
- Dates: 7–24 September
- Teams: 11 (from 1 confederation)
- Venues: 2 (in 2 host cities)

Final positions
- Champions: New Zealand (8th title)
- Runners-up: Fiji
- Third place: New Caledonia
- Fourth place: Tahiti

Tournament statistics
- Matches played: 18
- Goals scored: 71 (3.94 per match)
- Attendance: 5,410 (301 per match)
- Top scorer(s): (New Zealand) Oliver Colloty (New Zealand) Kian Donkers (9 goals each)
- Best player: (New Zealand) Jay Herdman
- Best goalkeeper: (New Zealand) Henry Gray

The 2022 OFC U-19 Championship was the 23rd edition of the OFC U-19/U-20 Championship, the biennial international youth football championship organised by the Oceania Football Confederation (OFC) for the men's under-19/under-20 national teams of Oceania.

The OFC announced on 4 March 2022 that the 2021 OFC U-20 Championship (originally the 2020 OFC U-19 Championship), which would have been hosted by Samoa, had been cancelled due to the COVID-19 pandemic, and Samoa would be retained to host the next edition in 2022. On 4 June 2021, the OFC announced the tournament had been moved to August from July.

The top two teams of the tournament qualified for the 2023 FIFA U-20 World Cup in Argentina as the OFC representatives. New Zealand the defending champions, won the title for the eighth time, and qualified together with runners-up Fiji.

== Teams ==
All 11 FIFA-affiliated national teams from the OFC are eligible to enter the tournament.

Starting from 2020, male youth tournaments no longer have a four-team qualifying stage, and all teams compete in one tournament.

Note: All appearance statistics include those in the qualifying stage (2016 and 2018).

| Team | Appearance | Previous best performance |
|---|---|---|
| American Samoa | 6th | Group stage (1998, 2011, 2014) |
| Cook Islands | 4th | Group stage (2001, 2016) |
| Fiji | 22nd | Champions (2014) |
| New Caledonia | 13th | Runners-up (2008) |
| New Zealand | 22nd | Champions (1980, 1992, 2007, 2011, 2013, 2016, 2018) |
| Papua New Guinea | 15th | Fourth place (1978, 1982) |
| Samoa | 10th | Group stage (1988, 1994, 1998, 2001, 2002, 2005, 2007) |
| Solomon Islands | 10th | Runners-up (2005, 2011) |
| Tahiti (hosts) | 12th | Champions (1974, 2008) |
| Tonga | 7th | Group stage (1998, 2001, 2002, 2005, 2018) |
| Vanuatu | 16th | Runners-up (2014, 2016) |

== Venues ==
| 2022 OFC U-19 Championship is located in Tahiti | Pirae | Papeete |
|---|---|---|
| 2022 OFC U-19 Championship is located in Tahiti | Stade Fautaua | Stade Pater |
| 2022 OFC U-19 Championship is located in Tahiti | Capacity: 10,000 | Capacity: 11,700 |

== Draw ==
The draw for the group stage was held on 19 July with teams seeded into pots based upon their ranking at the 2018 OFC U-19 Championship.

| Pot 1 | Pot 2 | Pot 3 |
|---|---|---|
| New Zealand; Tahiti; New Caledonia | Solomon Islands; Fiji; Papua New Guinea; Vanuatu | Tonga; Samoa; Cook Islands; American Samoa |

== Squads ==
Players born on or after 1 January 2003 were eligible to compete in the tournament.

== Group stage ==
All times are local, TAHT (UTC−10).

=== Group A ===
| Pos | Team | Pld | W | D | L | GF | GA | GD | Pts | Qualification |
|---|---|---|---|---|---|---|---|---|---|---|
| 1 | New Zealand | 3 | 3 | 0 | 0 | 23 | 0 | +23 | 9 | Knockout stage |
| 2 | Solomon Islands | 3 | 2 | 0 | 1 | 9 | 6 | +3 | 6 | Knockout stage |
| 3 | Cook Islands | 3 | 1 | 0 | 2 | 4 | 11 | −7 | 3 | |
| 4 | American Samoa | 3 | 0 | 0 | 3 | 0 | 19 | −19 | 0 | |

Source: OFC
7 September 2022
12:00

| Solomon Islands | 6–0 | American Samoa |
|---|---|---|
| Limoki 10'; Paul 17', 26', 66'; Suri 28', 70' | Report |

Stade Fautaua, Papeete
Attendance: 200
Referee: Norbert Hauata (Tahiti)
7 September 2022
15:00

| Cook Islands | 0–8 | New Zealand |
|---|---|---|
| | Report | Donkers 2', 22', 35', 43' (pen.); Herdman 39'; Colloty 70' (pen.), 84'; Fay 82' |

Stade Fautaua, Papeete
Attendance: 200
Referee: Veer Singh (Fiji)

10 September 2022
12:00

| Cook Islands | 0–3 | Solomon Islands |
|---|---|---|
| | Report | Hou 2'; Paul 27'; Rocky 69' |

Stade Fautaua, Papeete
Attendance: 70
Referee: Kavitesh Behari (Fiji)
10 September 2022
15:00

| New Zealand | 9–0 | American Samoa |
|---|---|---|
| Manuel 27'; Colloty 36', 49' (pen.), 58'; Beale 40', 73'; Surman 45+2'; Donkers 75' (pen.), 84' | Report |

Stade Fautaua, Papeete
Attendance: 300
Referee: Keith Kitumbing (Papua New Guinea)

13 September 2022
12:00

| American Samoa | 0–4 | Cook Islands |
|---|---|---|
| | Report | Tregu 10'; Tuakana 19'; Beal 78', 88' |

Stade Fautaua, Papeete
Attendance: 100
Referee: Timothy Niu (Solomon Islands)
13 September 2022
15:00

| New Zealand | 6–0 | Solomon Islands |
|---|---|---|
| Donkers 23', 45+1' (pen.); Supyk 55', 70'; O'Leary 67'; Conchie 87' | Report |

Stade Fautaua, Papeete
Attendance: 120
Referee: Norbert Hauata (Tahiti)

=== Group B ===
| Pos | Team | Pld | W | D | L | GF | GA | GD | Pts | Qualification |
|---|---|---|---|---|---|---|---|---|---|---|
| 1 | Tahiti (H) | 3 | 2 | 1 | 0 | 11 | 0 | +11 | 7 | Knockout stage |
| 2 | Fiji | 3 | 2 | 1 | 0 | 6 | 0 | +6 | 7 | Knockout stage |
| 3 | Papua New Guinea | 3 | 1 | 0 | 2 | 3 | 6 | −3 | 3 | Knockout stage |
| 4 | Tonga | 3 | 0 | 0 | 3 | 0 | 14 | −14 | 0 | |

Source: OFC
(H) Hosts
8 September 2022
17:00

| Fiji | 3–0 (w/o) (Note: On 8 September 2022, Vanuatu and Papua New Guinea announced they would be unable to play their opening games of the tournament.) | Papua New Guinea |
|---|---|---|
| | Report |

Stade Pater, Pirae
8 September 2022
20:00

| Tonga | 0–8 | Tahiti |
|---|---|---|
| | Report | Shan 25'; H. Bennett 53'; Boube 64', 67', 70'; Morgant 79' (pen.); Sangue 86'; Pautu 89' |

Stade Pater, Pirae
Attendance: 600
Referee: Ben Aukwai (Solomon Islands)

11 September 2022
17:00

| Tonga | 0–3 | Fiji |
|---|---|---|
| | Report | Raheem 64'; Mohammed 71'; Begg 84' |

Stade Pater, Pirae
Attendance: 150
Referee: Campbell-Kirk Kawana-Waugh (New Zealand)
11 September 2022
20:00

| Tahiti | 3–0 (w/o) (Note: On 12 September 2022, Vanuatu and Papua New Guinea announced they would be unable to play their second games of the tournament.) | Papua New Guinea |
|---|---|---|
| | Report |

Stade Pater, Pirae

14 September 2022
20:00

| Tahiti | 0–0 | Fiji |
|---|---|---|
| | Report |

Stade Pater, Pirae
Attendance: 600
Referee: Calvin Berg (New Zealand)
15 September 2022
15:00

| Papua New Guinea | 3–0 (w/o) (Note: Tonga did not turn up to the stadium before the scheduled kickoff time and hence, Papua New Guinea were awarded a 3–0 win.) | Tonga |
|---|---|---|
| | Report |

Stade Pater, Pirae

=== Group C ===
| Pos | Team | Pld | W | D | L | GF | GA | GD | Pts | Qualification |
|---|---|---|---|---|---|---|---|---|---|---|
| 1 | New Caledonia | 2 | 2 | 0 | 0 | 7 | 0 | +7 | 6 | Knockout stage |
| 2 | Samoa | 2 | 1 | 0 | 1 | 3 | 4 | −1 | 3 | Knockout stage |
| 3 | Vanuatu | 2 | 0 | 0 | 2 | 0 | 6 | −6 | 0 | Knockout stage |

Source: OFC
8 September 2022
14:00

| New Caledonia | 3–0 (w/o) | Vanuatu |
|---|---|---|
| | Report |

Stade Pater, Pirae

11 September 2022
14:00

| Vanuatu | 0–3 (w/o) | Samoa |
|---|---|---|
| | Report |

Stade Pater, Pirae

14 September 2022
14:00

| Samoa | 0–4 | New Caledonia |
|---|---|---|
| | Report | Jone 34'; Read 45+2', 66', 77' |

Stade Pater, Pirae
Attendance: 100
Referee: Veer Singh (Fiji)

=== Ranking of third-placed teams ===
Due to groups having a different number of teams, the results against the fourth-placed teams in four-team groups were not considered for this ranking.

| Pos | Grp | Team | Pld | W | D | L | GF | GA | GD | Pts | Qualification |
|---|---|---|---|---|---|---|---|---|---|---|---|
| 1 | B | Papua New Guinea | 2 | 0 | 0 | 2 | 0 | 6 | −6 | 0 | Knockout stage |
| 1 | C | Vanuatu | 2 | 0 | 0 | 2 | 0 | 6 | −6 | 0 | Knockout stage |
| 3 | A | Cook Islands | 2 | 0 | 0 | 2 | 0 | 11 | −11 | 0 | |

Source: OFC
Rules for classification: Group stage tiebreakers

== Knockout stage ==
=== Bracket ===
Quarter-finals
18 September – Pirae
New Zealand | 5
Papua New Guinea | 0
18 September – Pirae
Tahiti | 1
Vanuatu | 0
18 September – Pirae
New Caledonia | 1
Solomon Islands | 0
18 September – Pirae
Fiji | 4
Samoa | 1

Semi-finals
21 September – Pirae
New Zealand | 2
Tahiti | 0
21 September – Pirae
New Caledonia | 0
Fiji | 1

Final
24 September – Pirae
New Zealand | 3
Fiji | 0
Third place match
24 September – Pirae
Tahiti | 1 (4)
New Caledonia (p) | 1 (5)

=== Quarter-finals ===
18 September 2022
09:30

| Fiji | 4–1 | Samoa |
|---|---|---|
| Mani 35', 45+1', 56' (pen.); Rotidara 86' | Report | Leddy 54' |

Stade Pater, Pirae
Attendance: 100
Referee: Timothy Niu (Solomon Islands)

18 September 2022
13:00

| New Caledonia | 1–0 | Solomon Islands |
|---|---|---|
| Read 4' (pen.) | Report |

Stade Pater, Pirae
Attendance: 120
Referee: Calvin Berg (New Zealand)

18 September 2022
16:30

| New Zealand | 5–0 | Papua New Guinea |
|---|---|---|
| McKay 20', 26'; Herdman 60'; Colloty 88', 90' | Report |

Stade Pater, Pirae
Attendance: 150
Referee: Ben Aukwai (Solomon Islands)

18 September 2022
20:00

| Tahiti | 1–0 | Vanuatu |
|---|---|---|
| Shan 12' | Report |

Stade Pater, Pirae
Attendance: 350
Referee: Kavitesh Behari (Fiji)

=== Semi-finals ===
Winners qualify for 2023 FIFA U-20 World Cup.

21 September 2022
16:30

| Fiji | 1–0 | New Caledonia |
|---|---|---|
| Begg 75' | Report |

Stade Pater, Pirae
Attendance: 150
Referee: McKenzie Kawana-Waugh (New Zealand)

21 September 2022
20:00

| New Zealand | 2–0 | Tahiti |
|---|---|---|
| Hughes 2'; Donkers 52' | Report |

Stade Pater, Pirae
Attendance: 1,200
Referee: Ben Aukwai (Solomon Islands)

=== Third place match ===
24 September 2022
17:00

| New Caledonia | 1–1 | Tahiti |
|---|---|---|
| Jone 74' | Report | K. Bennett 18' (pen.) |
Penalties
| Upa (penalty missed); C. Forest (penalty scored); Waouka (penalty scored); Kugogne (penalty scored); S. Forest (penalty scored); Boano (penalty scored) | 5–4 | (penalty missed) Papaura; (penalty scored) Teihotu; (penalty scored) K. Bennett; (penalty scored) Vahirua; (penalty scored) Teniau; (penalty missed) Malakai |

Stade Pater, Pirae
Attendance: 500
Referee: Kavitesh Behari (Fiji)

=== Final ===
24 September 2022
20:00

| Fiji | 0–3 | New Zealand |
|---|---|---|
| | Report | Colloty 34', 40'; Herdman 83' |

Stade Pater, Pirae
Attendance: 400
Referee: Norbert Hauata (Tahiti)

== Qualified teams for FIFA U-20 World Cup ==
The following two teams from OFC qualify for the 2023 FIFA U-20 World Cup in Argentina.

| Team | Qualified on | Previous appearances in FIFA U-20 World Cup^{1} |
|---|---|---|
| Fiji | 21 September 2022 | 1 (2015) |
| New Zealand | 21 September 2022 | 6 (2007, 2011, 2013, 2015, 2017, 2019) |

^{1} Bold indicates champions for that year. Italic indicates hosts for that year.

== Awards ==
The following awards were given at the conclusion of the tournament.

| Award | Player |
|---|---|
| Golden Ball | (New Zealand) Jay Herdman |
| Golden Boot | (New Zealand) Oliver Colloty (New Zealand) Kian Donkers |
| Golden Gloves | (New Zealand) Henry Gray |

== Goalscorers ==
There were 71 goals scored in 18 matches, for an average of 3.94 goals per match.

9 goals

- (New Zealand) Oliver Colloty
- (New Zealand) Kian Donkers

4 goals

- (New Caledonia) Willy Read
- (Solomon Islands) Francis Paul

3 goals

- (Fiji) Melvin Mani
- (New Zealand) Jay Herdman
- (French Polynesia) Mathis Boube

2 goals

- (Cook Islands) Dalziel Beal
- (Fiji) Nabil Begg
- (New Caledonia) Paul Jone
- (New Zealand) Charlie Beale
- (New Zealand) Dan McKay
- (New Zealand) Adam Supyk
- (Solomon Islands) Alden Suri
- (French Polynesia) Manuarii Shan

1 goal

- (Cook Islands) Silas Tregu
- (Cook Islands) Ngametau Tuakana
- (Fiji) Mustafa Mohammed
- (Fiji) Mohammed Raheem
- (Fiji) Peniasi Rotidara
- (New Zealand) Fin Conchie
- (New Zealand) Oliver Fay
- (New Zealand) Isaac Hughes
- (New Zealand) Jackson Manuel
- (New Zealand) Everton O'Leary
- (New Zealand) Finn Surman
- (Samoa) Victor Leddy
- (Solomon Islands) Selwyn Hou
- (Solomon Islands) Barrie Limoki
- (Solomon Islands) Junior Rocky
- (French Polynesia) Herehau Bennett
- (French Polynesia) Kamalani Bennett
- (French Polynesia) Hauroa Morgant
- (French Polynesia) Kahutia Pautu
- (French Polynesia) Tekaki Sangue
