= Cook Islands national under-20 football team =

National association football team

Cook Islands U20
- Nickname: The Cooks
- Association: Cook Islands; Football Association
- Confederation: OFC (Oceania)
- Head coach: (England) Alan Taylor
- Captain: William Napa
- Most caps: Conroy Tiputoa (7)
- Top scorer: Dwayne Tiputoa (5)
- FIFA code: COK
First colours	Second colours

First international
- Cook Islands 1–1 Tonga (Rarotonga, Cook Islands; February 15, 2001)

Biggest win
- Cook Islands 5–0 American Samoa (Nukuʻalofa, Tonga; June 27, 2016)

Biggest defeat
- Cook Islands 0–11 Australia (Rarotonga, Cook Islands; February 21, 2001)

World Cup
- Appearances: 0

OFC U20 Championship
- Appearances: 3
- Best result: Group Stage (2001, 2016, 2018)

The Cook Islands national under-20 football team is the national U-20 team of the Cook Islands and is controlled by the Cook Islands Football Association. With a population of around 24,000 people it remains one of the smallest FIFA teams.

== History ==
Cook Islands have only won two games so far. A 2–0 win awarded against Samoa in 2001 and a 5–0 win against American Samoa in 2016.

== Competition Record ==
=== OFC ===
The OFC Under 20 Qualifying Tournament is a tournament held once every two years to decide the qualification spots for Oceania Football Confederation (OFC) and representatives at the FIFA U-20 World Cup.

OFC U-19 Championship								Qualification record					
Year	Round	Pld	W	D	L	GF	GA	Pld	W	D	L	GF	GA
(French Polynesia) 1974	Did not enter							No qualification					
(New Zealand) 1978	Did not enter							No qualification					
(Fiji) 1980	Did not enter							No qualification					
(Papua New Guinea) 1982	Did not enter							No qualification					
(Australia) 1985	Did not enter							No qualification					
(New Zealand) 1986	Did not enter							No qualification					
(Fiji) 1988	Did not enter							No qualification					
(Fiji) 1990	Did not enter							No qualification					
(French Polynesia) 1992	Did not enter							No qualification					
(Fiji) 1994	Did not enter							No qualification					
(New Zealand) 1997	Did not enter							No qualification					
(Samoa) 1998	Did not enter							No qualification					
(New Caledonia) (Cook Islands) 2001	Group stage	5	1	1	3	3	21	No qualification					
(Vanuatu) (Fiji) 2002	Did not enter							No qualification					
(Solomon Islands) 2005	Did not enter							No qualification					
(New Zealand) 2007	Did not enter							No qualification					
(French Polynesia) 2008	Did not enter							No qualification					
(New Zealand) 2011	Did not enter							No qualification					
(Fiji) 2013	Did not enter							No qualification					
(Fiji) 2014	Did not enter							No qualification					
(Tonga) (Vanuatu) 2016	Group stage	3	0	0	3	1	9	3	2	1	0	7	1
(Cook Islands) (French Polynesia) 2018	Did not qualify							3	1	0	2	2	5
(French Polynesia) 2022	Group stage	3	1	0	2	4	11	No qualification					
(Vanuatu) (Samoa) 2024	Did not qualify							3	1	1	1	4	5
(Cook Islands) (Samoa) 2026	To be determined							To be determined					
Total	Group stage	20	6	3	11	21	52						

== Current squad ==
The following players were called up for the 2022 OFC U-19 Championship from 7 to 20 September 2022. Names in italics denote players who have been capped for the Senior team.

Caps and goals as of 14 September 2022 after the game against American Samoa.

No.	Pos.	Player	Date of birth (age)	Caps	Goals	Club
1	GK	Ngereine Maro	March 20, 2005 (age 21)	3	0	(New Zealand Football) Western Suburbs
20	GK	Apiti Arere	March 2, 2005 (age 21)	1	0	(Cook Islands Football Association) Vaipae
23	GK	Moana Rakei	July 18, 2003 (age 23)	0	0	(Cook Islands Football Association) Nikao Sokattak
3	DF	Temarii Jubilee	May 14, 2005 (age 21)	2	0	(Cook Islands Football Association) Titikaveka
12	DF	Ariki Kiriau	November 11, 2005 (age 20)	1	0	(Cook Islands Football Association) Avatiu
8	DF	Nuku Mokoroa	May 15, 2004 (age 22)	3	0	(Cook Islands Football Association) Nikao Sokattak
11	DF	Jean Tua	December 10, 2003 (age 22)	3	0	(Cook Islands Football Association) Matavera Ngatangiia
12	DF	Ariki Kiriau	November 11, 2005 (age 20)	1	0	(Cook Islands Football Association) Avatiu
13	DF	Davida David	October 18, 2003 (age 22)	3	0	(Cook Islands Football Association) Puaikura
14	DF	Nia Remuera	May 1, 2005 (age 21)	3	0	(Cook Islands Football Association) Nikao Sokattak
18	DF	Jordan Matapo	July 12, 2006 (age 20)	1	0	(Cook Islands Football Association) Nikao Sokattak
19	DF	Dwayne Matapo	July 12, 2006 (age 20)	2	0	(Cook Islands Football Association) Nikao Sokattak
2	MF	Oscar Wichman	July 1, 2005 (age 21)	3	0	(Cook Islands Football Association) Avatiu
4	MF	Brook Kurariki	August 17, 2003 (age 23)	2	0	(Cook Islands Football Association) Nikao Sokattak
5	MF	Shane Tuteru	June 29, 2006 (age 20)	3	0	(Cook Islands Football Association) Tupapa Maraerenga
6	MF	Ngametua Tuakana	February 28, 2005 (age 21)	3	1	(Cook Islands Football Association) Tupapa Maraerenga
16	MF	Hubert Tou	May 15, 2003 (age 23)	3	0	(Cook Islands Football Association) Nikao Sokattak
	MF	Temaru Tutai	December 12, 2005 (age 20)	0	0	(Cook Islands Football Association) Avatiu
	MF	Kadecz Tatuava	August 21, 2003 (age 23)	0	0	(Cook Islands Football Association) Tupapa Maraerenga
	MF	Robert Conesa	October 12, 2005 (age 21)	0	0	(Cook Islands Football Association) Nikao Sokattak
	MF	Christopher Pita	November 11, 2005 (age 20)	0	0	(Cook Islands Football Association) Avatiu
	MF	Creedence Kiriwi	September 21, 2003 (age 23)	0	0	(New Zealand Football) Central United
7	MF	Silas Trego	May 26, 2003 (age 23)	3	1	(Cook Islands Football Association) Nikao Sokattak
9	FW	Dalziel Beal	April 26, 2005 (age 21)	3	2	(Cook Islands Football Association) Matavera Ngatangiia
10	FW	Marcus Gibbens	November 19, 2003 (age 22)	3	0	(Cook Islands Football Association) Matavera Ngatangiia
15	FW	Tione Nand	January 1, 2006 (age 20)	3	0	(Cook Islands Football Association) Avatiu
	FW	Taonga Poila	March 18, 2006 (age 20)	0	0	(Cook Islands Football Association) Tupapa Maraerenga

== List of coaches ==
- (Cook Islands) Tuka Tisam (-2016)
- (New Zealand) Matt Calcott (2016-2017)
- (England) Alan Taylor (2018-)

== See also ==
- Cook Islands men's national football team
- Cook Islands men's national under-17 football team
- Cook Islands women's national football team
- Cook Islands women's national under-17 football team
