= Solomon Islands national under-20 football team =

National association football team

Solomon Islands U20
- Nickname(s): Bonitos, Mamula's
- Association: Solomon Islands Football Federation
- Confederation: OFC (Oceania)
- Head coach: (Solomon Islands) Jerry Allen
- Captain: Junior Petua
- Top scorer: Atkin Kaua (5)
- FIFA code: SOL
First colours	Second colours

First international
- Fiji 1–3 Solomon Islands (Suva, Fiji; 24 September 1994)

Biggest win
- American Samoa 0–23 Solomon Islands (Apia, Samoa; 15 August 1998)

Biggest defeat
- New Zealand 6–0 Solomon Islands (Papeete, Tahiti; 13 September 2022)

World Cup
- Appearances: 0

OFC U-20 Championship
- Appearances: 10 (1994, 1998, 2001, 2005, 2007, 2011, 2014, 2016, 2018, 2022)
- Best result: Runners-up (2005, 2011)

The Solomon Islands national under-20 football team is the national U-20 team of the Solomon Islands and is controlled by the Solomon Islands Football Federation (SIFF)

== History ==
The Solomon Islands national under-20 football team took part in the OFC U-20 Championship tournament 10 times (1994, 1998, 2001, 2005, 2007, 2011, 2014, 2016, 2018 and 2022) and their best results were in 2005 and 2011 when the team reached the final, but they lost against Australia and New Zealand, respectively.

== Competition record ==
=== OFC ===
The OFC Under 20 Qualifying Tournament is a tournament held once every two years to decide the only two qualification spots for the Oceania Football Confederation (OFC) and its representatives at the FIFA U-20 World Cup.

OFC Under 20 Qualifying Tournament
Year	Round	Pld	W	D	L	GF	GA
(French Polynesia) 1974	Did not enter						
(Australia) 1978	Did not enter						
(Fiji) 1980	Did not enter						
(Papua New Guinea) 1982	Did not enter						
(Australia) 1985	Did not enter						
(New Zealand) 1987	Did not enter						
(Fiji) 1988	Did not enter						
(Fiji) 1990	Did not enter						
(French Polynesia) 1992	Did not enter						
(Fiji) 1994	Third place	5	3	0	2	5	8
(French Polynesia) 1997	Did not enter						
(Samoa) 1998	Fourth place	5	2	1	2	26	4
(New Caledonia) (Cook Islands) 2001	Group stage	4	3	0	1	12	2
(Vanuatu) (Fiji) 2002	Did not enter						
(Solomon Islands) 2005	Runners-up	5	4	0	1	12	6
(New Zealand) 2007	Third place	6	3	2	1	14	8
(French Polynesia) 2008	Did not enter						
(New Zealand) 2011	Runners-up	4	2	0	2	7	10
(Fiji) 2013	Did not enter						
(New Zealand) 2014	Fourth Place	5	1	1	3	7	7
(Tonga) (Vanuatu) 2016	Semi-finals	4	1	2	1	6	3
(Cook Islands) (French Polynesia) 2018	Fourth place	5	3	0	2	7	9
(French Polynesia) 2022	Quarter-finals	4	2	0	2	9	7
Total	10/23	47	24	6	17	105	64

=== FIFA U-20 World Cup ===
U-20 World Cup record
Year	Round	Pld	W	D	L	GF	GA	GD	Pts
(Tunisia) 1977	Did not qualify								
(Japan) 1979	Did not qualify								
(Australia) 1981	Did not qualify								
(Mexico) 1983	Did not qualify								
(Soviet Union) 1985	Did not qualify								
(Chile) 1987	Did not qualify								
(Saudi Arabia) 1989	Did not qualify								
(Portugal) 1991	Did not qualify								
(Australia) 1993	Did not qualify								
(Qatar) 1995	Did not qualify								
(Malaysia) 1997	Did not qualify								
(Nigeria) 1999	Did not qualify								
(Argentina) 2001	Did not qualify								
(United Arab Emirates) 2003	Did not qualify								
(Netherlands) 2005	Did not qualify								
(Canada) 2007	Did not qualify								
(Egypt) 2009	Did not qualify								
(Colombia) 2011	Did not qualify								
(Turkey) 2013	Did not qualify								
(New Zealand) 2015	Did not qualify								
(South Korea) 2017	Did not qualify								
(Poland) 2019	Did not qualify								
(Argentina) 2023	Did not qualify								
(Chile) 2025	Did not qualify								
(Azerbaijan) (Uzbekistan) 2027	To be determined								
Total	TBD	0/25	0	0	0	0	0	0	0

Solomon Islands's starting line-up against Papua New Guinea, OFC U-20 Championship 2014

=== Current technical staff ===
Position	
Head coach	(Solomon Islands) Jerry Allen
Assistant coach	(Solomon Islands) Eddie Rukumana
Team manager	(Solomon Islands) Leonard Paia
Physio	(Solomon Islands) Michael Lalagogno

== Current squad ==
The following players were called up for the 2022 OFC U-19 Championship from 7 to 20 September 2022. Names in italics denote players who have been capped for the Senior team.

Caps and goals as of 19 September 2022 after the game against New Caledonia.

No.	Pos.	Player	Date of birth (age)	Caps	Goals	Club
1	GK	Junior Petua	30 December 2003 (age 22)	4	0	(Solomon Islands Football Federation) Honiara City
12	GK	Ron Sale	7 November 2003 (age 22)	0	0	(Solomon Islands Football Federation) Isabel United
21	GK	John Sanga	22 March 2003 (age 23)	0	0	(Solomon Islands Football Federation) Marist
2	DF	Joel Luiramo	13 May 2003 (age 23)	4	0	(Solomon Islands Football Federation) Central Coast
3	DF	Arthur Reginald	19 March 2004 (age 22)	4	0	(Solomon Islands Football Federation) Laugu United
4	DF	Jayson Kofela	17 June 2004 (age 22)	0	0	(Solomon Islands Football Federation) Isabel United
5	DF	Wilfred Mani	9 June 2003 (age 23)	3	0	(Solomon Islands Football Federation) Southern United
13	DF	Zimri Kini	26 July 2004 (age 22)	3	0	(Solomon Islands Football Federation) Southern United
14	DF	Edward Aulanga	17 September 2003 (age 23)	0	0	(Solomon Islands Football Federation) Honiara City
15	DF	Vincent Liuga	26 January 2003 (age 23)	3	0	(Solomon Islands Football Federation) Isabel United
16	DF	Solomon Sale	3 August 2004 (age 22)	3	0	(Solomon Islands Football Federation) Honiara City
17	DF	Erick Bekaka	20 December 2003 (age 22)	1	0	(Solomon Islands Football Federation) Kossa
22	DF	Billy Afi	12 June 2005 (age 21)	4	0	(Solomon Islands Football Federation) Henderson Eels
24	DF	James Fefera	13 August 2004 (age 22)	0	0	(Solomon Islands Football Federation) Isabel United
6	MF	Cyral Enotarau	2 December 2003 (age 22)	4	0	(Solomon Islands Football Federation) Waneagu United
7	MF	Alden Suri	4 April 2004 (age 22)	3	2	(New Zealand Football) Petone
8	MF	Dolson Orisimae	29 December 2003 (age 22)	0	0	(Solomon Islands Football Federation) Waneagu United
11	MF	Francis Paul	5 September 2004 (age 22)	4	4	(Solomon Islands Football Federation) Waneagu United
18	MF	Prince Dansale	29 May 2003 (age 23)	0	0	(Solomon Islands Football Federation) Waneagu United
19	MF	Gregly Talo	28 August 2004 (age 22)	4	0	(Solomon Islands Football Federation) Real Kakamora
23	MF	Alfie Aunga	23 September 2003 (age 23)	4	0	(Solomon Islands Football Federation) Marist
9	FW	Rocky Junior	26 October 2003 (age 22)	4	1	(Solomon Islands Football Federation) Honiara City
10	FW	Barrie Limoki	2 March 2004 (age 22)	4	1	(Fiji Football Association) Nadi
20	FW	Selwyn Hou	2 December 2003 (age 22)	4	1	(Solomon Islands Football Federation) Honiara City
