= Tonga national under-20 football team =

National association football team

Tonga U20
- Association: Tonga Football Association
- Confederation: OFC (Oceania)
- Head coach: (Tonga) Timote Polovili
- Captain: Sione Tu'ifangaloka
- Most caps: Sione Tu'ifangaloka; Tevita Vakatapu; Vai Lutu (8)
- Top scorer: Hemaloto Polovili (3)
- FIFA code: TGA
First colours	Second colours

First international
- Samoa 1–0 Tonga (Apia, Samoa; 15 August 1998)

Biggest win
- Cook Islands 0–3 Tonga (Rarotonga, Cook Islands; 26 May 2018)

Biggest defeat
- Tonga 0–19 Australia (Honiara, Solomon Islands; 25 January 2005)

World Cup
- Appearances: 0

OFC U-20 Championship
- Appearances: 7 (1998, 2001, 2002, 2005, 2016, 2018, 2022)
- Best result: Group Stage (6 times)

The Tonga national under-20 football team represents Tonga in international Under–20 or youth football competitions and is controlled by the Tonga Football Association.

== OFC ==
The OFC Under-20 Qualifying Tournament is held once every two years to decide the only two qualification spots for the Oceania Football Confederation (OFC) and its representatives at the FIFA U-20 World Cup.

OFC U-19 Championship								Qualification record					
Year	Round	Pld	W	D	L	GF	GA	Pld	W	D	L	GF	GA
(French Polynesia) 1974	Did not enter							No qualification					
(New Zealand) 1978	Did not enter							No qualification					
(Fiji) 1980	Did not enter							No qualification					
(Papua New Guinea) 1982	Did not enter							No qualification					
(Australia) 1985	Did not enter							No qualification					
(New Zealand) 1986	Did not enter							No qualification					
(Fiji) 1988	Did not enter							No qualification					
(Fiji) 1990	Did not enter							No qualification					
(French Polynesia) 1992	Did not enter							No qualification					
(Fiji) 1994	Did not enter							No qualification					
(New Zealand) 1997	Did not enter							No qualification					
(Samoa) 1998	Group stage	3	0	0	3	1	16	No qualification					
(New Caledonia) (Cook Islands) 2001	Group stage	5	1	1	3	3	21	No qualification					
(Vanuatu) (Fiji) 2002	Group stage	4	0	0	4	4	28	No qualification					
(Solomon Islands) 2005	Group stage	3	0	0	3	1	28	No qualification					
(New Zealand) 2007	Did not enter							No qualification					
(French Polynesia) 2008	Did not enter							No qualification					
(New Zealand) 2011	Did not enter							No qualification					
(Fiji) 2013	Did not enter							No qualification					
(Fiji) 2014	Did not enter							No qualification					
(Tonga) (Vanuatu) 2016	Did not qualify							3	0	3	0	5	5
(Cook Islands) (French Polynesia) 2018	Group stage	3	0	0	3	0	20	3	2	1	0	6	1
(French Polynesia) 2022	Group stage	3	0	0	3	0	14	No qualification					
(Vanuatu) (Samoa) 2024	Did not qualify							3	1	1	1	5	7
(Cook Islands) (Samoa) 2026	To be determined							To be determined					
Total	Group stage	33	4	6	20	25	140						

=== FIFA U-20 World Cup ===
U-20 World Cup record
Year	Round	Pld	W	D	L	GF	GA	GD	Pts
(Tunisia) 1977 to (Chile) 2025	Did not qualify								
(Azerbaijan) (Uzbekistan) 2027	To be determined								
Total	TBD	0/25	0	0	0	0	0	0	0

== Current squad ==
The following players were called up for the 2022 OFC U-19 Championship from 7 to 20 September 2022. Names in italics denote players who have been capped for the Senior team.

Caps and goals as of 16 September 2022 after the game against Fiji.

No.	Pos.	Player	Date of birth (age)	Caps	Goals	Club
1	GK	Nimilote Moala	July 18, 2003 (age 23)	2	0	(Tonga Football Association) Foloha Marist Kauvai
16	GK	Manamo'ui Halahingano	November 5, 2003 (age 22)	0	0	(Tonga Football Association) Havelu
22	GK	Viliame Li	January 11, 2004 (age 22)	0	0	(Tonga Football Association) Navutoka
2	DF	Unaloto Aho	April 6, 2004 (age 22)	1	0	(Tonga Football Association) Nukuhetulu
3	DF	Macklean Veatupu	March 11, 2004 (age 22)	1	0	(Tonga Football Association) Nukuhetulu
4	DF	Feleti Lonitenisi	April 2, 2004 (age 22)	2	0	(Tonga Football Association) Utui
5	DF	Ulukaulupe Akolo	September 16, 2003 (age 23)	2	0	(Tonga Football Association) Havelu
8	DF	Utu'one Lea'aetoa	February 16, 2005 (age 21)	0	0	(Tonga Football Association) Veitongo
13	DF	Napoleone Hala	May 10, 2004 (age 22)	1	0	(Tonga Football Association) Feletoa
17	DF	Penisimani Latu	December 11, 2005 (age 20)	2	0	(Tonga Football Association) Nukuhetulu
19	DF	Fakaofo Tonga	October 29, 2004 (age 21)	1	0	(Tonga Football Association) Navutoka
23	DF	Motu Pasikala	September 1, 2005 (age 21)	2	0	(Tonga Football Association) Toloa Old Boys
6	MF	Christopher Kefu	February 11, 2003 (age 23)	2	0	(Tonga Football Association) Veitongo
7	MF	Sosefo Mailangi	November 9, 2003 (age 22)	2	0	(Tonga Football Association) Havelu
11	MF	Lisiate Feke	March 25, 2004 (age 22)	1	0	(Tonga Football Association) Longolongo
14	MF	Michael Fotu	August 23, 2004 (age 22)	2	0	(Tonga Football Association) Nukuhetulu
15	MF	Herick Funaki	August 7, 2003 (age 23)	1	0	(Tonga Football Association) Longolongo
18	MF	Kotoni Talia'uli	November 2, 2004 (age 21)	0	0	(Tonga Football Association) Fasi mo e Afi
20	MF	Sosefo Tolu	February 25, 2004 (age 22)	0	0	(Tonga Football Association) Longoteme
24	MF	Petelo Naniseni	December 20, 2003 (age 22)	1	0	(Tonga Football Association) Navutoka
9	FW	Kulisitofa Kite	January 17, 2003 (age 23)	2	0	(Tonga Football Association) Lavengatonga
10	FW	Amoni Fifita	June 26, 2004 (age 22)	2	0	(Tonga Football Association) Makave
12	FW	Sione Veamatahau	April 12, 2003 (age 23)	1	0	(Tonga Football Association) Navutoka
21	FW	Kipione Fetuiaki	April 1, 2003 (age 23)	1	0	(Tonga Football Association) Utui
25	FW	Tomasi Teu	May 11, 2004 (age 22)	2	0	(Tonga Football Association) Foloha Marist Kauvai
