= Tahiti national under-20 football team =

Tahiti U20
- Nickname: Toa Aito (Les guerriers de fer / Iron Warriors)
- Association: Tahitian Football Federation
- Confederation: OFC (Oceania)
- Head coach: (France) Bruno Tehaamoana
- Captain: Roonui Tehau
- Most caps: Hauragi Huri (6)
- Top scorer: Heirauari Salem, Roonui Tehau & Eddy Kaspard (3)
- FIFA code: TAH
First colours	Second colours

First international
- Tahiti 2–1 New Hebrides (Papeete, Tahiti; December 8, 1974)

Biggest win
- Tahiti 8–0 Tonga (Papeete, Tahiti; 8 September 2022)

Biggest defeat
- Tahiti 0–10 Australia (Tahiti; 6 September 2016)

World Cup
- Appearances: 2 (2009, 2019)
- Best result: Group Stage (2009, 2019)

OFC U-20 Championship
- Appearances: 12 (1974, 1980, 1990, 1992, 1994, 1997, 2001, 2007, 2008, 2016, 2018)
- Best result: Winners (1974, 2008)

The Tahiti national under-20 football team is the national U-20 team of Tahiti and is controlled by the Tahitian Football Federation.

== Competition record ==
=== FIFA U-20 World Cup record ===
FIFA U-20 World Cup record
Year	Round	GP	W	D	L	GS	GA
1977–2007	Did not qualify						
(Egypt) 2009	Group stage	3	0	0	3	0	21
2011–2017	Did not qualify						
(Poland) 2019	Group stage	3	0	0	3	0	14
2023–2025	Did not qualify						
(Azerbaijan) (Uzbekistan) 2027	To be determined						
(Armenia) (Georgia (country)) 2029	To be determined						
Total	2/26	6	0	0	6	0	35

=== OFC ===
The OFC Under 20 Qualifying Tournament is a tournament held once every two years to decide the two qualification spots for the Oceania Football Confederation (OFC) and its representatives at the FIFA U-20 World Cup.

OFC Under 20 Qualifying Tournament
Year	Round	Position	Pld	W	D	L	GF	GA
(French Polynesia) 1974	Champions	1st	4	3	0	1	10	6
(Australia) 1978	Did not enter							
(Fiji) 1980	Group stage		2	0	0	2	1	3
(Papua New Guinea) 1982	Did not enter							
(Australia) 1985	Did not enter							
(New Zealand) 1987	Did not enter							
(Fiji) 1988	Did not enter							
(Fiji) 1990	Fourth place	4th	4	1	1	2	3	10
(French Polynesia) 1992	Runners-up	2nd	4	2	1	1	6	4
(Fiji) 1994	Group stage		3	1	0	2	2	7
(French Polynesia) 1997	Fourth place	4th	4	0	0	4	3	20
(Samoa) 1998	Did not enter							
(New Caledonia) (Cook Islands) 2001	Group stage		4	1	0	3	9	15
(Vanuatu) (Fiji) 2002	Did not enter							
(Solomon Islands) 2005	Did not enter							
(New Zealand) 2007	Fifth place	5th	6	2	1	3	7	9
(French Polynesia) 2008	Champions	1st	3	2	1	0	4	1
(New Zealand) 2011	Did not enter							
(Fiji) 2013	Did not enter							
(Fiji) 2014	Did not enter							
(Tonga) (Vanuatu) 2016	Group stage		3	1	1	1	6	7
(Cook Islands) (French Polynesia) 2018	Runners-up	2nd	5	3	0	2	9	2
(French Polynesia) 2022	Fourth place	4th	4	3	2	1	13	3
Total	2 titles	12/23	41	16	7	20	64	85

== Current squad ==
The following players were called up for the 2022 OFC U-19 Championship from 7 to 20 September 2022. Names in italics denote players who have been capped for the Senior team.

Caps and goals as of 6 September 2022 before the game against Tonga.

No.	Pos.	Player	Date of birth (age)	Caps	Goals	Club
1	GK	Keahinui Heinis	3 August 2005 (age 21)	0	0	(Tahitian Football Federation) Tefana
16	GK	Hotuarii Tavaearii	10 April 2003 (age 23)	0	0	(Tahitian Football Federation) Taiarapu
22	GK	Anapa Debruyne	22 September 2003 (age 23)	0	0	(Tahitian Football Federation) Vénus
2	DF	Josh Hunter	13 October 2005 (age 20)	0	0	(Tahitian Football Federation) Tefana
4	DF	Haumau Tanetoa	13 November 2004 (age 21)	0	0	(Tahitian Football Federation) Pirae
5	DF	Hiurai Vernaudon	18 January 2004 (age 22)	0	0	(Tahitian Football Federation) Central Sport
12	DF	Nehemia Teriitahi	20 January 2004 (age 22)	0	0	(Tahitian Football Federation) Pirae
17	DF	Tekaviu Teihotu	7 June 2004 (age 22)	0	0	(Tahitian Football Federation) Temanava
18	DF	Tevaitini Teumere	2 April 2003 (age 23)	3	0	(Tahitian Football Federation) Vénus
21	DF	Herehau Bennett	26 March 2005 (age 21)	0	0	(Tahitian Football Federation) Tefana
23	DF	Manuarii Vahirua	30 January 2003 (age 23)	0	0	(Tahitian Football Federation) Central Sport
25	DF	Heimana Belin	24 May 2003 (age 23)	0	0	(Tahitian Football Federation) Tefana
3	MF	Heihau Hanere	5 July 2003 (age 23)	0	0	(Tahitian Football Federation) Tiare Anani
6	MF	Raihiti Douepere	10 February 2003 (age 23)	0	0	(Tahitian Football Federation) Temanava
8	MF	Tekaki Sangue	17 June 2003 (age 23)	0	0	(Tahitian Football Federation) Mataiea
13	MF	Kamalani Bennett	25 December 2005 (age 20)	0	0	(Tahitian Football Federation) Tefana
14	MF	Heinoa Aurentz	30 August 2005 (age 21)	0	0	(Tahitian Football Federation) Taiarapu
15	MF	Puni Temarii	25 November 2003 (age 22)	0	0	(Tahitian Football Federation) Arue
19	MF	Jason Malakai	18 February 2005 (age 21)	0	0	(Tahitian Football Federation) Vénus
20	MF	Matai Papaura	6 April 2005 (age 21)	0	0	(Tahitian Football Federation) Pueu
24	MF	Mana Teniau	15 January 2005 (age 21)	0	0	(Tahitian Football Federation) Vénus
26	MF	Clement Tehahe	18 June 2003 (age 23)	0	0	(Tahitian Football Federation) Taiarapu
7	FW	Kahutia Pautu	22 May 2003 (age 23)	0	0	(Tahitian Football Federation) Tefana
9	FW	Hauroa Morgant	21 May 2004 (age 22)	0	0	(Tahitian Football Federation) Tefana
10	FW	Manuarii Shan	23 February 2004 (age 22)	0	0	(Tahitian Football Federation) Vénus
11	FW	Mathis Boube	29 January 2004 (age 22)	0	0	(Tahitian Football Federation) Temanava

== Head-to-head record ==
The following table shows Tahiti's head-to-head record in the FIFA U-20 World Cup.

Opponent	Pld	W	D	L	GF	GA	GD	Win %
Colombia	1	0	0	1	0	6	−6	0.00
Nigeria	1	0	0	1	0	5	−5	0.00
Poland	1	0	0	1	0	5	−5	0.00
Senegal	1	0	0	1	0	3	−3	0.00
Spain	1	0	0	1	0	8	−8	0.00
Venezuela	1	0	0	1	0	8	−8	0.00
Total	6	0	0	6	0	35	−35	0.00
