= Mohammed Raheem =

Fijian footballer

Personal information
- Full name: Mohammed Fataul Raheem
- Date of birth: 10 August 2003 (age 23)
- Place of birth: Seaqaqa, Fiji
- Height: 1.74 m (5 ft 9 in)
- Position: Midfielder

Team information
- Current team: Ba

Youth career
- 2015–2021: Seaqaqa

Senior career*
Years	Team	Apps	(Gls)
2021–2023	Seaqaqa		
2023–	Ba		

International career^{‡}
2022–	Fiji U20	7	(1)
2023–	Fiji U23	2	(0)
2024–	Fiji	4	(2)
- * Club domestic league appearances and goals as of 14:48, 23 March 2024 (UTC) ‡ National team caps and goals as of 14:58, 19 June 2024 (UTC)

Mohammed Raheem (born 10 August 2003) is a Fijian footballer who currently plays for Fiji Premier League club Ba and the Fiji national team.

== Club career ==
Raheem began his career in the youth setup of his local club Seaqaqa F.C. in 2015. That year he was named the best player of the U12 league semi-finals as Seaqaqa defeated Nadroga to advance to the championship. He progressed through the club's ranks, eventually making his Fiji Premier League debut with the senior team. In 2022, he was a key player for Seaqaqa first-team as it advanced deep into the Inter-District Championship (IDC).

In February 2023, Raheem transferred to perennial league contenders Ba. He scored the game-winning goal against Labasa to qualify for the semi-finals of the 2023 IDC. In the next match, Raheem scored a hat-trick in the semis en route to Ba eventually winning the championship. He went on to win the tournament's golden boot award as top scorer in the competition. In January 2024, the player confirmed his commitment to the club and announced he would be remaining part of the squad for the 2024 season.

== International career ==
Raheem represented Fiji at the youth level in the 2022 OFC U-19 Championship. He scored against Tonga in a 3–0 victory that propelled Fiji to the knockout rounds. Fiji ultimately won the silver medal in the tournament, falling to New Zealand in the final. Raheem was included in Fiji's squad for the 2023 FIFA U-20 World Cup held in Argentina. He went on to appear in all three of his country's matches in the tournament. In preparation for the competition, Raheem was part of the squad that competed in the 2023 PSSI U-20 Mini Tournament in Indonesia in which Fiji would compete against Guatemala, New Zealand and the hosts. In August of that year, Raheem was part of Fiji's national under-23 team that competed in the 2023 OFC Men's Olympic Qualifying Tournament.

In October 2023, Raheem was added to the Fiji senior national team squad for the 2023 Pacific Games after an impressive club season. However, he was not part of the final roster because it was too late to make additions to the squad. He went on to make his senior international debut on 18 March 2024 in a friendly away at the Solomon Islands. He scored his first senior international goal in the match, an eventual 1–2 defeat. Three days later, he scored again against the same opponents, this time in a 2–0 victory.

== Career statistics ==
=== International ===
As of match played 8 September 2024

Appearances and goals by national team and year
National team	Year	Apps	Goals
Fiji	2024	8	2
Total		8	2

Scores and results list Fiji's goal tally first, score column indicates score after each Raheem goal.

List of international goals scored by Mohammed Raheem
No.	Date	Venue	Opponent	Score	Result	Competition
1	18 March 2024	Lawson Tama Stadium, Honiara, Solomon Islands	Solomon Islands	1–0	1–2	Friendly
2	21 March 2024	Lawson Tama Stadium, Honiara, Solomon Islands	Solomon Islands	1–0	2–0	Friendly
