= New Zealand men's national under-20 football team =

New Zealand Under-20
- Nickname: Youth All Whites
- Association: New Zealand Football
- Confederation: OFC (Oceania)
- Head coach: José Figueira
- Captain: Finn Surman
- Most caps: Ian Hogg (16)
- Top scorer: Oliver Colloty (11)
- FIFA code: NZL
First colours	Second colours

First international
- New Zealand 4–2 New Caledonia (Papeete, French Polynesia; 8 December 1974)

Biggest win
- New Zealand 16–0 Western Samoa (Suva, Fiji; 5 September 1988)

Biggest defeat
- New Zealand 0–6 Australia (Ba, Fiji; 8 September 1990); United States 6–0 New Zealand (Incheon, South Korea; 1 June 2017)

FIFA U-20 World Cup
- Appearances: 6 (first in 2007)
- Best result: Round of 16 (2015, 2017, 2019, 2023)

OFC U-19 Men's Championship
- Appearances: 23 (first in 1974)
- Best result: Champions (1980, 1992, 2007, 2011, 2013, 2016, 2018, 2022, 2024)

AFC U-20 Asian Cup
- Appearances: 1 (first in 1992)
- Best result: Group stage (1992)

The New Zealand men's national under-20 football team, more commonly known as the Youth All Whites, is controlled by New Zealand Football and represents New Zealand in international Under 20 or youth football competitions. The 25,000 capacity North Harbour Stadium is used for home games of the Junior All Whites.

== Competition record ==
=== OFC U-19 Championship ===
The OFC U-19 Men's Championship is a tournament held once every two years to decide the two qualification spots for the Oceania Football Confederation (OFC) and its representatives at the FIFA U-20 World Cup.

OFC U-20 Championship / OFC U-19 Championship record
Year	Round	Pos	Pld	W	D*	L	GF	GA
(French Polynesia) 1974	Runners-up	2nd	4	3	0	1	13	5
(New Zealand) 1978	Third place	3rd	3	1	1	1	6	3
(Fiji) 1980	Champions	1st	3	2	1	0	9	2
(Papua New Guinea) 1982	Runners-up	2nd	4	2	0	2	16	6
(Australia) 1985	Third place	3rd	5	3	0	2	21	9
(New Zealand) 1986	Third place	3rd	4	0	3	1	1	4
(Fiji) 1988	Runners-up	2nd	5	4	0	1	21	2
(Fiji) 1990	Runners-up	2nd	4	2	0	2	5	9
(French Polynesia) 1992	Champions	1st	4	4	0	0	8	1
(Fiji) 1994	Runners-up	2nd	5	4	0	1	12	2
(French Polynesia) 1997	Runners-up	2nd	4	2	0	2	9	6
(Samoa) 1998	Third place	3rd	5	3	1	1	20	4
(New Caledonia) (Cook Islands) 2001	Runners-up	2nd	6	5	0	1	10	6
(Vanuatu) (Fiji) 2002	Group stage	3rd	4	3	0	1	17	2
(Solomon Islands) 2005	Group stage	5th	3	1	0	2	8	3
(New Zealand) 2007	Champions	1st	6	5	1	0	21	4
(French Polynesia) 2008	Third place	3rd	3	1	1	1	6	4
(New Zealand) 2011	Champions	1st	4	4	0	0	22	1
(Fiji) 2013	Champions	1st	4	4	0	0	13	2
(Fiji) 2014	Did not enter							
(Vanuatu) 2016	Champions	1st	5	4	1	0	15	2
(French Polynesia) 2018	Champions	1st	5	5	0	0	23	2
(French Polynesia) 2022	Champions	1st	6	6	0	0	33	0
(Samoa) 2024	Champions	1st	5	5	0	0	23	0
(Samoa) 2026	Champions	1st	5	5	0	0	24	1
Total	10 titles	23/24	106	78	9	19	356	80

=== FIFA U-20 World Cup ===
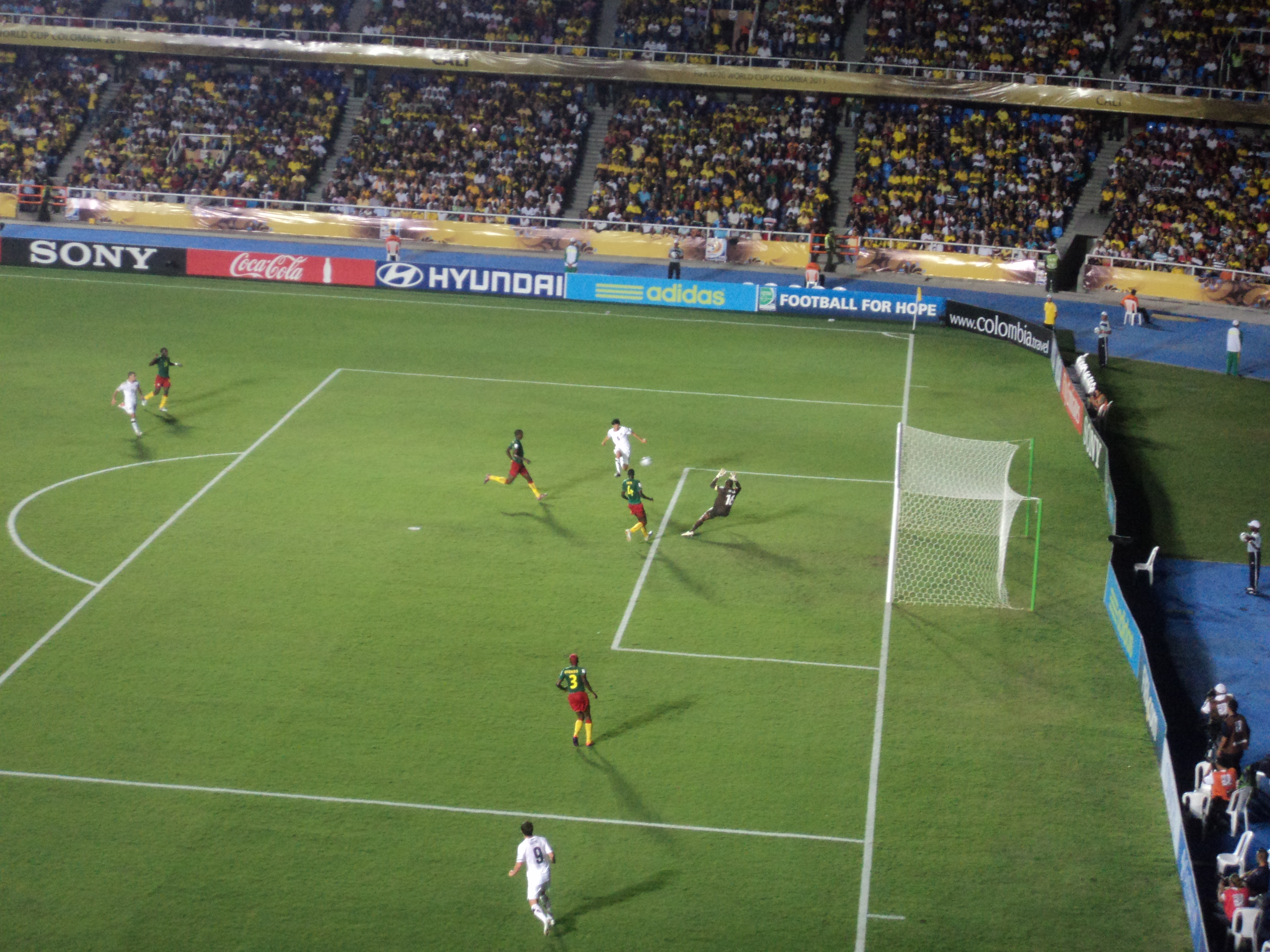
New Zealand (in white) playing Cameroon U20 in the 2011 FIFA U-20 World Cup.

FIFA U-20 World Cup record
Year	Round	Pos	Pld	W	D*	L	GF	GA	Squad
(Tunisia) 1977	Did not enter								
(Japan) 1979	Did not qualify								
(Australia) 1981	Did not qualify								
(Mexico) 1983	Did not qualify								
(Soviet Union) 1985	Did not qualify								
(Chile) 1987	Did not qualify								
(Saudi Arabia) 1989	Did not qualify								
(Portugal) 1991	Did not qualify								
(Australia) 1993	Did not qualify								
(Qatar) 1995	Did not qualify								
(Malaysia) 1997	Did not qualify								
(Nigeria) 1999	Did not qualify								
(Argentina) 2001	Did not qualify								
(United Arab Emirates) 2003	Did not qualify								
(Netherlands) 2005	Did not qualify								
(Canada) 2007	Group stage	22nd	3	0	0	3	1	5	Squad
(Egypt) 2009	Did not qualify								
(Colombia) 2011	Group stage	17th	3	0	2	1	2	3	Squad
(Turkey) 2013	Group stage	23rd	3	0	0	3	1	7	Squad
(New Zealand) 2015	Round of 16	14th	4	1	1	2	6	7	Squad
(South Korea) 2017	Round of 16	16th	4	1	1	2	3	9	Squad
(Poland) 2019	Round of 16	11th	4	2	1	1	8	3	Squad
(Argentina) 2023	Round of 16	14th	4	1	1	2	3	11	Squad
(Chile) 2025	Group stage	19th	3	1	0	2	3	6	Squad
(Azerbaijan) (Uzbekistan) 2027	Qualified								
(Armenia) (Georgia (country)) 2029	To be determined								
Total	Round of 16	8/26	28	6	6	16	27	51	—

*Denotes draws include knockout matches decided on penalty kicks.

=== 2007 FIFA U-20 World Cup ===
2 July Group C	Portugal	2–0	New Zealand	Toronto, Ontario, Canada
14:15 EDT	Gama 45', 61' (pen.)	Report		Stadium: National Soccer Stadium; Attendance: 19,526; Referee: (Colombia) Hernando Buitrago

5 July Group C	New Zealand	0–1	Gambia	Toronto, Ontario, Canada
17:00 EDT		Report	22' Jallow	Stadium: National Soccer Stadium; Attendance: 11,869; Referee: (El Salvador) Joel Aguilar

8 July Group C	New Zealand	1–2	Mexico	Toronto, Ontario, Canada
15:15 EDT	Pelter 89'	Report	24' Bermúdez; 78' Mares	Stadium: Commonwealth Stadium; Attendance: 29,972; Referee: (Algeria) Mohamed Benouza

=== 2011 FIFA U-20 World Cup ===
30 July Group B	Cameroon	1–1	New Zealand	Cali, Colombia
17:00 UTC−05:00	Mbondi 33'	Report	40' (o.g.) Tchaha	Stadium: Estadio Olímpico Pascual Guerrero; Attendance: 35,262; Referee: (Scotland) William Collum

2 August Group B	Uruguay	1–1	New Zealand	Cali, Colombia
17:00 UTC−05:00	Luna 74'	Report	57' Bevin	Stadium: Estadio Olímpico Pascual Guerrero; Attendance: 28,884; Referee: (Turkey) Cüneyt Çakır

5 August Group B	Portugal	1–0	New Zealand	Cali, Colombia
17:00 UTC−05:00	Rui 31'	Report		Stadium: Estadio Olímpico Pascual Guerrero; Attendance: 31,395; Referee: (South Korea) Kim Dong-Jin

=== 2013 FIFA U-20 World Cup ===
23 June Group F	New Zealand	0–3	Uzbekistan	Bursa, Turkey
17:00 UTC+03:00		Report	14' Makhstaliev; 53' Sergeev; 67' Turapov	Stadium: Bursa Atatürk Stadium; Referee: (Paraguay) Antonio Arias

26 June Group F	New Zealand	0–2	Uruguay	Bursa, Turkey
18:00 UTC+03:00		Report	4' De Arrascaeta; 75' Nicolás López	Stadium: Bursa Atatürk Stadium; Referee: (Spain) Alberto Undiano Mallenco

29 June Group F	Croatia	2–1	New Zealand	Bursa, Turkey
18:00 UTC+03:00	Perica 11'; Rebić 75'	Report	84' (pen.) Fenton	Stadium: Bursa Atatürk Stadium; Referee: (Brazil) Sandro Ricci

=== 2015 FIFA U-20 World Cup ===
30 May Group A	New Zealand	0–0	Ukraine	North Harbour Stadium, Auckland
13:00		Report		Attendance: 25,000; Referee: Mauro Vigliano (Argentina)

2 June Group A	New Zealand	0–4	United States	North Harbour Stadium, Auckland
19:00		Report	Jamieson 6'; Hyndman 33'; Arriola 58'; Rubin 83'	Attendance: 15,678; Referee: Antonio Mateu Lahoz (Spain)

5 June Group A	Myanmar	1–5	New Zealand	Wellington Regional Stadium, Wellington
19:00	Aung Thu 28'	Report	Billingsley 40'; Patterson 47'; Stevens 78'; Brotherton 81'; Lewis 89'	Attendance: 15,527; Referee: John Pitti (Panama)

11 June Round of 16	Portugal	2–1	New Zealand	Waikato Stadium, Hamilton
19:30	Guzzo 24'; Martins 87'	Report	Holthusen 64'	Attendance: 10,492; Referee: Kim Jong-hyeok (South Korea)

=== 2017 FIFA U-20 World Cup ===
22 May Group E	Vietnam	0–0	New Zealand	Cheonan Stadium, Cheonan
20:00		Report		Attendance: 8,000; Referee: Sidi Alioum (Cameroon)

25 May Group E	New Zealand	3–1	Honduras	Cheonan Stadium, Cheonan
20:00	Bevan 1', 56' (pen.); Ashworth 23'	Report	Álvarez 50'	Attendance: 6,074; Referee: Diego Haro (Peru)

28 May Group E	New Zealand	0–2	France	Daejeon World Cup Stadium, Daejeon
15:00		Report	Saint-Maximin 22', 37'	Attendance: 4,280; Referee: Kim Jong-hyeok (South Korea)

1 June Round of 16	United States	6–0	New Zealand	Incheon Football Stadium, Incheon
20:00	Sargent 32'; Ebobisse 64'; Lennon 65'; Glad 76'; Trusty 84'; Kunga 90+3'	Report		Attendance: 5,667; Referee: Abdulrahman Al-Jassim (Qatar)

=== 2019 FIFA U-20 World Cup ===
24 May 2019 Group C	Honduras	0–5	New Zealand	Lublin, Poland
18:00 CEST		Report	Diego 8' (o.g.); Waine 17', 27'; Singh 51'; Conroy 90+1'	Stadium: Arena Lublin; Attendance: 4,484; Referee: Alexis Herrera (Venezuela)

27 May 2019 Group C	Norway	0–2	New Zealand	Łódź, Poland
20:30 CEST		Report	Stensness 71'; Kitolano 83' (o.g.)	Stadium: Stadion Widzewa; Attendance: 2,165; Referee: Jean-Jacques Ndala Ngambo (DR Congo)

30 May 2019 Group C	New Zealand	0–2	Uruguay	Łódź, Poland
18:00 CEST		Report	Núñez 40'; B. Rodríguez 90+5'	Stadium: Stadion Widzewa; Attendance: 4,385; Referee: Adham Makhadmeh (Jordan)

2 June 2019 Round of 16	Colombia	1–1 (a.e.t.) (5–4 p)	New Zealand	Łódź, Poland
20:30 CEST	Reyes 11'	Report	Just 35'	Stadium: Stadion Widzewa; Attendance: 9,283; Referee: Ahmed Al-Kaf (Oman)
	Penalties
	Vera (penalty missed); Carbonero (penalty missed); Perea (penalty scored); Sandoval (penalty scored); Angulo (penalty scored); Balanta (penalty scored); Cuesta (penalty scored)		(penalty scored) Singh; (penalty missed) Bell; (penalty scored) Mata; (penalty missed) Stensness; (penalty scored) McCowatt; (penalty scored) Cacace; (penalty missed) Conroy

=== 2023 FIFA U-20 World Cup ===
20 May 2023 Group A	Guatemala	0–1	New Zealand	Santiago del Estero, Argentina
15:00		Report	Garbett 80'	Stadium: Estadio Único Madre de Ciudades; Attendance: 15,100; Referee: Abongile Tom (South Africa)

23 May 2023 Group A	New Zealand	2–2	Uzbekistan	Santiago del Estero, Argentina
15:00	Wallace 23'; Herdman 41'	Report	Abbosbek 51'; Esanov 90+3'	Stadium: Estadio Único Madre de Ciudades; Attendance: 12,243; Referee: Oshane Nation (Jamaica)

26 May 2023 Group A	New Zealand	0–5	Argentina	San Juan, Argentina
18:00		Report	Puch 14'; Infantino 17'; Romero 35'; Aguirre 50' (pen.); Véliz 86'	Stadium: Estadio San Juan del Bicentenario; Attendance: 27,836; Referee: Salman Falahi (Qatar)

30 May 2023 Round of 16	United States	4–0	New Zealand	Mendoza, Argentina
14:30	Wolff 14'; Cowell 61'; Che 75'; Pukstas 82'	Report		Stadium: Estadio Malvinas Argentinas; Attendance: 7,848; Referee: Mohamed Marouf (Egypt)

=== 2025 FIFA U-20 World Cup ===
27 September 2025 Group A	Chile	2–1	New Zealand	Santiago, Chile
20:00	Millán 54'; Garguez 90+7'	Report	Walker 85' (pen.)	Stadium: Estadio Nacional Julio Martínez Prádanos; Attendance: 45,547; Referee: Irfan Peljto (Bosnia and Herzegovina)

30 September 2025 Group A	Egypt	1–2	New Zealand	Santiago, Chile
17:00	Ahmed Kabaka 5'	Report	Brooke-Smith 13'; Loke 16'	Stadium: Estadio Nacional Julio Martínez Prádanos; Attendance: 5,991; Referee: Khalid Al-Thurais (Saudi Arabia)

3 October 2025 Group A	New Zealand	0–3	Japan	Valparaíso, Chile
20:00		Report	Ogura 22'; Smith 64' (o.g.); Ishii 82'	Stadium: Estadio Elías Figueroa Brander; Attendance: 2,938; Referee: Kevin Ortega (Peru)

== Results and fixtures ==
Results from previous 12 months and upcoming fixtures.

=== 2026 ===
2 September 2026 2026 OFC U-19 Championship	New Zealand	8–0	Tahiti	FFS Football Stadium (Field 2), Apia
15:00	Martin 8'; Cartwright 37'; Hill 40'; Smith 45+3'; Grosso 60'; Fitzharris 72', 86'; Henry 75'	Report		Attendance: 60; Referee: David Yareboinen (Papua New Guinea)

5 September 2026 2026 OFC U-19 Championship	New Zealand	2–0	Fiji	FFS Football Stadium (Field 2), Apia
15:00	Ferguson 54'; Grosso 79'	Report		Attendance: 60; Referee: David Yareboinen (Papua New Guinea)

8 September 2026 2026 OFC U-19 Championship	Vanuatu	0–6	New Zealand	FFS Football Stadium (Field 2), Apia
15:00		Report	Sloane-Rodrigues 35'; Grosso 45'; Ferguson 50', 56', 76'; Hill 71'	Attendance: 50; Referee: Peter Olomaga (Samoa)

11 September 2026 2026 OFC U-19 Championship	New Zealand	6–1	New Caledonia	FFS Football Stadium (Field 1), Apia
15:00	Hill 23', 50'; Lienard 43'; Sloane-Rodrigues 53'; Martin 64'; Grosso 90+4'	Report	Katrawa 70' (pen.)	Referee: Ben Aukwai (Solomon Islands)

14 September 2026 2026 OFC U-19 Championship	Tahiti	0–2	New Zealand	FFS Football Stadium (Field 1), Apia
15:00		Report	Dieulengard 45' (o.g.); Hill 79'	Attendance: 60; Referee: Ben Aukwai (Solomon Islands)

== Current squad ==
The following players were called up for the 2025 FIFA U-20 World Cup which was played between 27 September and 19 October 2025.

Caps and goals updated as of 3 October 2025, after the match against Japan. Names in bold denote players who have been capped for the senior team.

No.	Pos.	Player	Date of birth (age)	Caps	Goals	Club
1	GK	Joe Wallis	7 June 2005 (age 21)	1	0	(The Football Association) West Bromwich Albion
13	GK	Henry Gray	29 March 2005 (age 21)	8	0	(The Football Association) Ipswich Town
21	GK	Josey Casa-Grande	19 August 2005 (age 21)	0	0	(The Football Association) Dorchester Town
2	DF	Xuan Loke	26 March 2005 (age 21)	6	1	(New Zealand Football) Wellington Phoenix
3	DF	**Lukas Kelly-Heald** (captain)	18 March 2005 (age 21)	11	0	(New Zealand Football) Wellington Phoenix
4	DF	James Bulkeley	14 May 2005 (age 21)	6	1	(United States Soccer Federation) North Texas
5	DF	Adama Coulibaly	10 January 2005 (age 21)	5	0	(New Zealand Football) Auckland FC
11	DF	Codey Phoenix	3 February 2005 (age 21)	5	2	(New Zealand Football) Auckland FC
14	DF	Noah Dupont	18 October 2007 (age 18)	1	0	(The Football Association) West Bromwich Albion
15	DF	Jayden Smith	4 July 2007 (age 19)	3	0	(New Zealand Football) Wellington Phoenix
6	MF	Fergus Gillion	19 January 2005 (age 21)	8	1	(New Zealand Football) Wellington Phoenix
16	MF	Ryan Watson	14 June 2005 (age 21)	6	3	(New Zealand Football) Wellington Phoenix
18	MF	Finn McKenlay	4 September 2005 (age 21)	7	0	(New Zealand Football) Auckland FC
19	MF	Oliver Middleton	19 September 2005 (age 21)	3	0	(New Zealand Football) Auckland FC
7	FW	**Luke Brooke-Smith**	6 June 2008 (age 18)	3	1	(New Zealand Football) Wellington Phoenix
8	FW	Troy Putt	27 September 2006 (age 20)	2	0	(United States Soccer Federation) Minnesota United
9	FW	Keegan Kelly	5 June 2004 (age 22)	7	4	(United States Soccer Federation) Denver Pioneers
10	FW	Nathan Walker	30 January 2006 (age 20)	7	2	(New Zealand Football) Wellington Phoenix
12	FW	Luke Supyk	4 March 2006 (age 20)	7	2	(New Zealand Football) Wellington Phoenix
17	FW	Gabriel Sloane-Rodrigues	3 July 2007 (age 19)	7	2	(New Zealand Football) Wellington Phoenix
20	FW	Stipe Ukich	3 January 2007 (age 19)	8	2	(Croatian Football Federation) Istra 1961

=== Recent call-ups ===
The following players have previously been called up to the New Zealand under-20 squad in the last 12 months and remain eligible.

Pos.	Player	Date of birth (age)	Caps	Goals	Club	Latest call-up

== Honours ==
- OFC U-19 Men's Championship:
  - Winners (10): 1980, 1992, 2007, 2011, 2013, 2016, 2018, 2022, 2024, 2026.
  - Runners-up (7): 1974, 1982, 1988, 1990, 1994, 1997, 2001.

== Head-to-head record ==
The following table shows New Zealand's head-to-head record in the FIFA U-20 World Cup, AFC U-20 Asian Cup and OFC U-19 Men's Championship.

=== In FIFA U-20 World Cup ===
Opponent	Pld	W	D	L	GF	GA	GD	Win %
Argentina	1	0	0	1	0	5	−5	0.00
Cameroon	1	0	1	0	1	1	+0	0.00
Chile	1	0	0	1	1	2	−1	0.00
Colombia	1	0	1	0	1	1	+0	0.00
Croatia	1	0	0	1	1	2	−1	0.00
Egypt	1	1	0	0	2	1	+1	100.00
France	1	0	0	1	0	2	−2	0.00
Gambia	1	0	0	1	0	1	−1	0.00
Guatemala	1	1	0	0	1	0	+1	100.00
Honduras	2	2	0	0	8	1	+7	100.00
Japan	1	0	0	1	0	3	−3	0.00
Mexico	1	0	0	1	1	2	−1	0.00
Myanmar	1	1	0	0	5	1	+4	100.00
Norway	1	1	0	0	2	0	+2	100.00
Portugal	3	0	0	3	1	5	−4	0.00
Ukraine	1	0	1	0	0	0	+0	0.00
United States	3	0	0	3	0	14	−14	0.00
Uruguay	3	0	1	2	1	5	−4	0.00
Uzbekistan	2	0	1	1	2	5	−3	0.00
Vietnam	1	0	1	0	0	0	+0	0.00
Total	28	6	6	16	27	51	−24	21.43

=== In AFC U-20 Asian Cup ===
Opponent	Pld	W	D	L	GF	GA	GD	Win %
Qatar	1	0	0	1	0	3	−3	0.00
Saudi Arabia	1	0	0	1	1	3	−2	0.00
South Korea	1	0	0	1	1	5	−4	0.00
Thailand	1	0	0	1	0	2	−2	0.00
Total	4	0	0	4	2	13	−11	0.00

=== In OFC U-19 Men's Championship ===
Opponent	Pld	W	D	L	GF	GA	GD	Win %
American Samoa	2	2	0	0	17	0	+17	100.00
Australia	14	2	0	12	14	33	−19	14.29
Chinese Taipei	3	2	1	0	6	2	+4	66.67
Cook Islands	2	2	0	0	11	0	+11	100.00
Fiji	18	13	3	2	44	12	+32	72.22
Israel	2	0	1	1	3	5	−2	0.00
New Caledonia	12	11	1	0	48	10	+38	91.67
Papua New Guinea	11	11	0	0	55	0	+55	100.00
Samoa	6	6	0	0	40	2	+38	100.00
Solomon Islands	10	6	3	1	18	5	+13	60.00
Tahiti	15	12	0	3	36	8	+28	80.00
Tonga	2	2	0	0	21	0	+21	100.00
Vanuatu	9	9	0	0	43	3	+40	100.00
Total	106	78	9	19	356	80	+276	73.58
