= Jay Herdman =

New Zealand footballer (born 2004)

Personal information
- Full name: Jay Joshua Herdman
- Date of birth: 14 August 2004 (age 22)
- Place of birth: Invercargill, New Zealand
- Height: 1.69 m (5 ft 7 in)
- Position: Midfielder

Team information
- Current team: Bali United
- Number: 10

Youth career
- Hibiscus Coast
- Surrey United SC
- 2017–2022: Vancouver Whitecaps FC

Senior career*
Years	Team	Apps	(Gls)
2022–2024	Whitecaps FC 2	47	(9)
2024	→ Vancouver Whitecaps FC (loan)	1	(0)
2024	→ Cavalry FC (loan)	6	(1)
2025–2026	Cavalry FC	23	(0)
2025	→ Vancouver FC (loan)	3	(0)
2026–	Bali United	2	(0)

International career^{‡}
2022	Canada U20	1	(0)
2022	New Zealand U19	6	(3)
2022–2023	New Zealand U20	8	(3)
2023	New Zealand U22	2	(1)
2024–	New Zealand U23	3	(0)
- * Club domestic league appearances and goals as of 10 October 2026 ‡ National team caps and goals as of 31 July 2024

Jay Joshua Herdman (born 14 August 2004) is a New Zealand professional footballer who plays for Super League club Bali United. He is a youth international for New Zealand.

== Early life ==
Herdman began playing youth soccer at age four with Hibiscus Coast. He moved to Canada at age 8, when his father was named the head coach of the Canada women's team. He later played in Canada with Surrey United SC, before joining the Vancouver Whitecaps Academy in August 2017. He spent time with the Vancouver Whitecaps FC first team during their 2021 and 2022 pre-seasons, including making an appearance in a pre-season fixture against Indy Eleven.

== Club career ==
In March 2022, Herdman signed a contract with Whitecaps FC 2. He made his professional debut on 26 March against Houston Dynamo 2. In November 2023, he signed an extension with the team for the 2024 season. While with Whitecaps 2, he served as team captain for a spell. After participating in the 2024 pre-season with the Vancouver Whitecaps first team, he signed a short-term loan agreement with them ahead of their CONCACAF Champions Cup Round One first leg against Tigres UANL, but was an unused substitute in the match. He signed addition short-term loans on March 1 and April 19. On April 20, he made his Major League Soccer debut, in a substitute appearance against Seattle Sounders FC.

=== Cavalry FC ===
In September 2024, Herdman was loaned to Canadian Premier League club Cavalry FC for the remainder of the 2024 season. Upon his move to Cavalry, he was converted to a left winger role, from his typical central attacking roles. He made his debut on September 15 against Atlético Ottawa. He scored his first goal and added his first assist, in his first start for Cavalry, on October 5 against Pacific FC. After the 2024 season, Whitecaps 2 declined his option for 2025. In January 2025, he signed a permanent contract with Cavalry. In August 2025, Herdman was loaned to Vancouver FC for the remainder of the season.

=== Bali United ===
In August 2026, Herdman would transfer to Bali United for an undisclosed fee.

== International career ==
Herdman is eligible for New Zealand through birth, England through parentage and Canada through residency.

In April 2022, he was called up to the Canadian U20 team for the first time for a camp in Costa Rica. He made his debut in a friendly during the camp against Costa Rica U20.

In August 2022, he was named in the New Zealand U19 squad to contest the 2022 OFC U-19 Championship. On 7 September 2022, Herdman made his debut scored his first goal against Cook Islands in an 8–0 win. Herdman won the Golden Ball, as the top player in the tournament, which New Zealand won.

In March 2023, he was called up to the New Zealand U22 for friendlies against China U24 (in preparation for the 2024 Olympic team, which is a U23 tournament). He debuted for the U22s in the first match on 23 March, and scored a late winner in a 2–1 victory on 26 March.

In May 2023, he was named to the New Zealand U20 for the 2023 FIFA U-20 World Cup. He made his World Cup debut in the first match against Guatemala U20 on 20 May. On 23 May, he scored in a 2–2 draw against Uzbekistan U20.

In July 2024, he was named to the New Zealand U23 for the 2024 Olympics.

== Personal life ==
Herdman is the son of Indonesia national team head coach John Herdman.

== Career statistics ==
As of July 28, 2026

Club	Season	League			Playoffs		Cup		Continental		Total	
Club	Season	Division	Apps	Goals	Apps	Goals	Apps	Goals	Apps	Goals	Apps	Goals
Whitecaps FC 2	2022	MLS Next Pro	18	2	–		–		–		18	2
Whitecaps FC 2	2023	MLS Next Pro	8	1	–		–		–		8	1
Whitecaps FC 2	2024	MLS Next Pro	20	6	–		–		–		20	6
Whitecaps FC 2	Total		46	9	0	0	0	0	0	0	46	9
Vancouver Whitecaps FC (loan)	2024	Major League Soccer	1	0	0	0	0	0	0	0	1	0
Cavalry FC (loan)	2024	CPL	6	1	2	0	0	0	0	0	8	1
Cavalry FC	2025	CPL	14	0	0	0	2	0	2	0	18	0
Cavalry FC	2026	CPL	9	0	0	0	2	0	0	0	11	0
Cavalry FC	Total		29	1	2	0	4	0	2	0	37	1
Vancouver FC (loan)	2025	Canadian Premier League	3	0	–		0	0	–		3	0
Career total			79	10	2	0	4	0	2	0	87	10

== Honours ==
Cavalry FC

- Canadian Premier League: 2024

New Zealand

- OFC U-19 Championship: 2022

Individual

- OFC U-19 Championship Golden Ball: 2022
