= Alden Suri =

Solomon Islands footballer

Personal information
- Date of birth: 4 April 2004 (age 22)
- Place of birth: Solomon Islands
- Position: Midfielder

Team information
- Current team: Kossa

Senior career*
Years	Team	Apps	(Gls)
2022–2024	Petone	8	(3)
2024–2025	Christchurch United	1	(0)
2025–	Kossa		

International career
2019	Solomon Islands U17	1	(0)
2022	Solomon Islands U20	3	(2)
- * Club domestic league appearances and goals as of 18:00, 14 October 2025 (UTC)

Alden Suri is a Solomon Islands footballer, who currently plays for Telekom S-League club Kossa.

== Club career ==
In 2020, Suri earned a scholarship to attend Scots College in Wellington, New Zealand along with fellow Solomon Islanders Leon Kofana and Raphael Lea'i. While at Scots College, Suri helped lead the school's team to a Trevor Rigbsy Cup title during his first season with the team. He tallied a goal and an assist in the final, a 3:2 victory over St Patrick's College. He was the tournament's Silver Boot winner with ten goals and four assists, one assist behind the top scorer. Because of his performances, Suri's scholarship was extended an additional two years. The following season, Suri won the Golden Boot award in the same tournament as the team finished runner-up. He scored two goals in the finals loss to Wellington College, and left the team following the 2022 season.

Suri joined Petone FC of the Central League in 2022. He made his league debut for the club on 9 April 2022, entering the match as a substitute against Wellington United. He scored his first goal for the club six days later against Napier City Rovers. Following the season, Suri won the Goal of the Season award at the annual Capital Football Awards.

After time off because of a serious knee injury, Suri joined Christchurch United of the Southern League in summer 2024. He left the club in March 2025 after a single season. Following his departure from Christchurch United, Suri returned to the Solomon Islands, joining Kossa F.C. of the S-League for the second half of the 2025 season after recovering from ACL reconstruction surgery.

== International career ==
Suri represented the Solomon Islands at the 2019 FIFA U-17 World Cup. Three years later, he was named to the nation's squad for the 2022 OFC U-19 Championship as one of two foreign-based players. In the competition, Suri scored a brace in a 6:0 victory over American Samoa in the Group Stage.

== Personal ==
Suri is the son of former Solomon Islands international and manager Batram Suri.
