= Matt Calcott =

New Zealand football manager

Personal information
- Place of birth: New Zealand

Managerial career
- Years: Team
- 2006–2009: Western Suburbs
- 2010–2011: Miramar Rangers
- 2011–2016: Team Wellington
- 2016–2017: Cook Islands U20
- 2017: Puaikura
- 2021–2022: Samoa

Matt Calcott is a New Zealand football manager, currently managing Samoa.

== Managerial career ==
In 2006, Calcott was appointed manager of Western Suburbs, after working at the club as an assistant coach. After three years at Western Suburbs, Calcott was appointed manager of Miramar Rangers. After a year at Miramar Rangers, Calcott joined Team Wellington as manager. In 2016, Calcott managed Team Wellington to the New Zealand Football Championship. In 2016, following his time at Team Wellington, Calcott was appointed manager of the Cook Islands' under-20 team. In January 2017, Calcott was named manager of Cook Islands club Puaikura, before leaving his position a month later.

In February 2021, whilst working as a used car salesman, Calcott was appointed manager of Samoa.
