= Henry Gray (footballer) =

New Zealand footballer (born 2005)

- Gray playing for the Wellington Phoenix in 2026.

Personal information
- Full name: Henry Merson Leonard Gray
- Date of birth: 29 March 2005 (age 21)
- Place of birth: Mönchengladbach, Germany
- Height: 1.93 m (6 ft 4 in)
- Position: Goalkeeper

Team information
- Current team: Wellington Phoenix (on loan from Ipswich Town)
- Number: 13

Youth career
- 2015–2021: Lower Hutt City

Senior career*
Years	Team	Apps	(Gls)
2021	Lower Hutt City	8	(0)
2021	→ Waterside Karori (loan)	3	(0)
2021–2023	Wellington Phoenix Reserves	4	(0)
2022–2023	→ Waterside Karori (loan)	9	(0)
2023–	Ipswich Town	0	(0)
2023–2024	→ Chelmsford City (loan)	22	(0)
2025	→ Braintree Town (loan)	20	(0)
2025	→ Braintree Town (loan)	0	(0)
2026	→ Harrogate Town (loan)	7	(0)
2026–	→ Wellington Phoenix (loan)	3	(0)

International career^{‡}
2022–	New Zealand U20	13	(0)
2026–	New Zealand	1	(0)
- * Club domestic league appearances and goals as of 2 November 2026 ‡ National team caps and goals as of 05:22, 1 October 2025 (UTC)

Henry Merson Leonard Gray (born 29 March 2005) is a professional footballer who plays as a goalkeeper for A-League Men club Wellington Phoenix, on loan from Premier League club Ipswich Town. Born in Germany, he plays for the New Zealand national team.

== Club career ==
Gray, at the right, before an opposition corner kick — playing for the Wellington Phoenix (October 2026).

Gray was born in Germany to English parents, and moved to New Zealand at a young age. He joined the youth academy of Lower Hutt City at the age of 10. In 2021 he began his senior career with Waterside Karori, before returning to Lower Hutt City's senior team. In 2021, he moved to Wellington Phoenix FC where he was assigned to their reserves in the New Zealand National League. On 25 March 2022, he was promoted to Wellington Phoenix FC's senior team.

On 16 May 2023, Gray transferred to the EFL Championship side Ipswich Town on a 2-year contract. On 10 December 2023, he went on loan to Chelmsford City in the National League. On 24 September 2024, he extended his contract with Ipswich Town until 2027. On 6 January 2025, he returned to the National League again on loan with Braintree Town. With 9 clean sheets in 20 matches, Gray was named Braintree Town's Player of the Season. On 21 October 2025, Gray rejoined Braintree Town on loan ahead of their National League Cup match that evening. However, later that week, he was recalled by Ipswich following an injury to goalkeeper Alex Palmer.

On 12 January 2026, Gray joined League Two club Harrogate Town on loan until the end of the season.

On 17 July 2026, Gray rejoined his former side Wellington Phoenix on a season long loan for the 2026–27 A-League Men season.

== International career ==
=== New Zealand U20 ===
Gray was part of the New Zealand U20s squad in their winning campaign at the 2022 OFC U-19 Championship, where he was named the goalkeeper of the tournament. He was also called up to the U20s for the 2023 FIFA U-20 World Cup. He was one of the alternate players for the New Zealand men's national under-23 football team that was called up to the 2024 Summer Olympics.

Gray was named as part of the 21-player New Zealand U20 squad for the 2025 FIFA U-20 World Cup that took place in Chile from September to October 2025. Gray made three appearances in the tournament, with New Zealand exiting after the conclusion of the group stage.

=== New Zealand ===
Gray was called up to the senior New Zealand national team for a set of friendlies in October 2023.

Gray made his debut for New Zealand in a 2–2 friendly with Palestine on 24 September 2026, coming on as a half-time substitute.

== Career statistics ==
As of match played 21 October 2025

Appearances and goals by club, season and competition
Club	Season	League			National cup		League cup		Other		Total	
Club	Season	Division	Apps	Goals	Apps	Goals	Apps	Goals	Apps	Goals	Apps	Goals
Lower Hutt City	2021	NZ National League	8	0	0	0	—		—		8	0
Waterside Karori (loan)	2021	NZ National League	3	0	0	0	—		—		3	0
Wellington Phoenix Reserves	2021	NZ National League	3	0	0	0	—		—		3	0
Wellington Phoenix Reserves	2022	NZ National League	1	0	0	0	—		—		1	0
Wellington Phoenix Reserves	2023	NZ National League	0	0	0	0	—		—		0	0
Wellington Phoenix Reserves	Total		4	0	0	0	0	0	0	0	4	0
Waterside Kaori (loan)	2022	NZ National League	5	0	0	0	—		—		5	0
Waterside Kaori (loan)	2023	NZ National League	4	0	0	0	—		—		4	0
Ipswich Town	2023–24	Championship	0	0	0	0	0	0	0	0	0	0
Ipswich Town	2024–25	Premier League	0	0	0	0	0	0	0	0	0	0
Ipswich Town	2025–26	Championship	0	0	0	0	0	0	0	0	0	0
Ipswich Town	Total		0	0	0	0	0	0	0	0	0	0
Chelmsford City (loan)	2024–25	National League South	23	0	0	0	—		0	0	23	0
Braintree Town (loan)	2024–25	National League	20	0	0	0	—		2 (Note: Appearances in National League Cup)	0	22	0
Braintree Town (loan)	2025–26	National League	0	0	0	0	—		1	0	1	0
Harrogate Town (loan)	2025–26	League Two	0	0	—		—		0	0	0	0
Wellington Phoenix (loan)	2026–27	A-League Men	0	0	—		—		0	0	0	0
Career total			67	0	0	0	0	0	3	0	70	0

== Honours ==
=== International ===
New Zealand U20

- OFC U-19 Championship: 2022

=== Individual ===
- 2022 OFC U-19 Championship Goalkeeper of the Tournament
- 2024–25 Braintree Town Player of the Season
