= Gabriel Sloane-Rodrigues =

New Zealand footballer (born 2007)

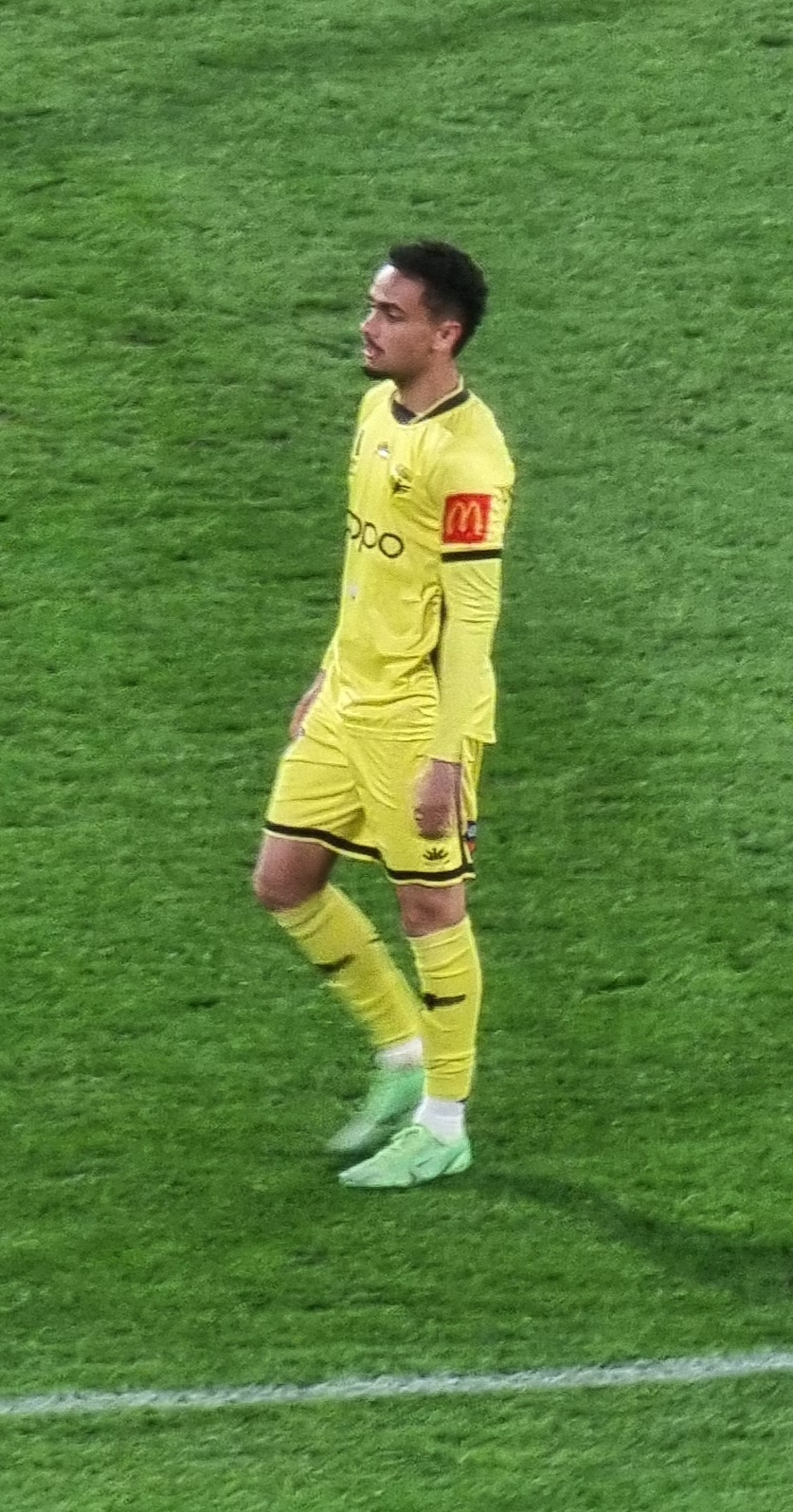
- Sloane-Rodrigues with the Wellington Phoenix in 2025

Personal information
- Full name: Gabriel Edward Sloane-Rodrigues
- Date of birth: 3 July 2007 (age 19)
- Place of birth: Hong Kong
- Position: Winger

Youth career
- East Coast Bays
- 2020–2021: Auckland United
- 2022–2024: Wellington Phoenix

Senior career*
Years	Team	Apps	(Gls)
2023–2026	Wellington Phoenix Reserves	28	(7)
2024–2026	Wellington Phoenix	5	(0)

International career^{‡}
2023–	New Zealand U17	7	(2)
2024–	New Zealand U20	1	(0)
- * Club domestic league appearances and goals as of 17 April 2026 ‡ National team caps and goals as of 9 July 2024

Gabriel Edward Sloane-Rodrigues (European Portuguese: [ɡɐ.bɾiˈɛl ʁuˈdɾi.ɡɨʃ]; born 3 July 2007) is a New Zealand footballer who plays as a forward, most recently for A-League Men side Wellington Phoenix.

== Club career ==
Born in Hong Kong to a Brazilian father and New Zealand mother, Sloane-Rodrigues moved to Auckland as a child and began his career in the youth systems of East Coast Bays and Auckland United. In 2022, aged 14, Sloane-Rodrigues moved to Wellington to link up with the academy of A-League Men side Wellington Phoenix. After initially appearing for their age-group sides, Sloane-Rodrigues made his first appearance for the Wellington Phoenix reserve team on 26 August 2023, coming on as a late substitute in a 2–1 Central League win over Western Suburbs.

Sloane-Rodrigues made his professional debut for Wellington Phoenix as a late substitute in a 1–0 loss against Melbourne City on 9 March 2024, and in the process became the Wellington Phoenix's youngest ever footballer at the age of 16 years and 250 days.

On 3 July 2026, it was announced that Sloane-Rodrigues would depart the club following a mutual termination of his contract.

== International career ==
Sloane-Rodrigues was named as part of the 21-player New Zealand U-20 squad for the 2025 FIFA U-20 World Cup taking place in Chile from September to October 2025.

== Personal life ==
Sloane-Rodrigues' father is former Corinthians footballer Jorginho. Jorginho moved to Hong Kong as a player in 2005, where Sloane-Rodrigues was eventually born. His mother is Donna Sloane, a school teacher and advocate of homeopathy, born in New Zealand.

== Honours ==
New Zealand

- OFC U-19 Championship: 2024
