= Oliver Colloty =

New Zealand footballer

Personal information
- Full name: Oliver John Colloty
- Date of birth: 4 July 2003 (age 23)
- Place of birth: Dunedin, New Zealand
- Height: 1.88 m (6 ft 2 in)
- Position: Striker

Team information
- Current team: Elgin City

Youth career
- –2014: Maori Hill
- 2015–2017: Roslyn Wakari
- 2018: Western Suburbs
- 2018: Southern United

Senior career*
| Years | Team | Apps | (Gls) |
| 2018–2020 | Southern United | 3 | (0) |
| 2019–2020 | Roslyn Wakari | 18 | (5) |
| 2020 | Dunedin Technical | 6 | (1) |
| 2021 | Christchurch United | 22 | (18) |
| 2022–2023 | Melville United | 31 | (20) |
| 2023 | Auckland City | 2 | (1) |
| 2024 | Wellington Olympic | 9 | (2) |
| 2024 | Auckland United | 10 | (3) |
| 2025–2026 | Peterhead | 23 | (6) |
| 2025–2026 | → Elgin City (loan) | 11 | (1) |
| 2026– | Elgin City | 5 | (1) |

International career^{‡}
| 2022–2023 | New Zealand U-20 | 13 | (11) |
- * Club domestic league appearances and goals as of 29 August 2026 ‡ National team caps and goals as of 6 June 2023

Oliver John Colloty (born 4 July 2003) is a New Zealand footballer who plays as a striker for Scottish League Two side Elgin City.

== Early life ==
Colloty was a student at Otago Boys' High School. In 2021 he won the Youth Player of the Year title for the Mainland Premier League.

== Career ==
Colloty made his debut for Southern United FC in the New Zealand Football Championship at fifteen years-old playing against Hawke's Bay United FC in March 2019. In 2022 he scored 20 goals in 31 games for Melville United AFC. He had a trial with Sheffield Wednesday in January 2023. Although born in Dunedin, Colloty has a British passport. However, the trial was cut short due to a hamstring injury. Colloty was also reportedly completed trials at Blackpool and Bolton Wanderers.

After returning to New Zealand he played for Auckland City FC in the second half of 2023, and then Wellington Olympic AFC in 2024. He signed for Auckland United in June 2024.

In October 2024, Colloty signed a pre-contract agreement to join Scottish League Two club Peterhead in January 2025. On 25 September 2025, he joined Elgin City on loan.

On 15 June 2026, Colloty returned to Elgin City on a free transfer and signed a two-year contract.

== International career ==
Colloty shared the golden boot with Kian Donkers as New Zealand triumphed in the OFC Under-19 Championship in 2022, and qualified for the 2023 FIFA U-20 World Cup held in Argentina in May 2023. His haul included a brace of goals in the final as New Zealand beat Fiji U-19 3–0 in Tahiti. Colloty was subsequently named in the New Zealand squad for the World Cup tournament.

== Career statistics ==
| Club | Season | League | | | Cup | | League Cup | | Continental | | Other | | Total | |
| Club | Season | Division | Apps | Goals | Apps | Goals | Apps | Goals | Apps | Goals | Apps | Goals | Apps | Goals |
|---|---|---|---|---|---|---|---|---|---|---|---|---|---|---|
| Southern United | 2018–19 | NZ Premiership | 2 | 0 | — | | — | | — | | — | | 2 | 0 |
| Southern United | 2019–20 | NZ Premiership | 1 | 0 | — | | — | | — | | — | | 1 | 0 |
| Southern United | Total | | 3 | 0 | 0 | 0 | 0 | 0 | 0 | 0 | 0 | 0 | 3 | 0 |
| Christchurch United | 2021 | NZ National League | 7 | 4 | 4 | 2 | | | — | | — | | 11 | 6 |
| Melville United | 2022 | NZ National League | 31 | 20 | 2 | 0 | — | | — | | — | | 33 | 20 |
| Auckland City | 2023 | NZ National League | 6 | 1 | 0 | 0 | — | | 0 | 0 | 0 | 0 | 6 | 1 |
| Wellington Olympic | 2024 | NZ National League | 9 | 2 | 0 | 0 | — | | 2 (Note: Appearances in OFC Champions League.) | 0 | 1 (Note: Appearances in Charity Cup.) | 0 | 12 | 2 |
| Auckland United | 2024 | NZ National League | 10 | 3 | 0 | 0 | — | | — | | — | | 10 | 3 |
| Peterhead | 2024–25 | Scottish League Two | 17 | 6 | — | | — | | — | | — | | 17 | 6 |
| Peterhead | 2025–26 | Scottish League One | 6 | 0 | 0 | 0 | 4 | 1 | — | | 4 (Note: Appearances in Scottish Challenge Cup) | 1 | 14 | 2 |
| Peterhead | Total | | | | | | | | | | | | | |
| Elgin City (loan) | 2025–26 | Scottish League Two | 10 | 1 | 2 | 1 | 0 | 0 | — | | 1 | 1 | 13 | 3 |
| Elgin City | 2026–27 | Scottish League Two | 4 | 0 | 0 | 0 | 4 | 1 | — | | 2 | 2 | 10 | 3 |
| Career total | | | | | | | | | | | | | | |

== Honours ==
Peterhead

- Scottish League Two: 2024–25

Individual

- Mainland Football Mens Youth of the Year: 2021
