= 2027 FIFA U-20 World Cup =

International youth football championship tournament

FIFA U-20 Dünya Çempionatı Azərbaycan–Özbəkistan 2027 FIFA U-20 Jahon Chempionati Ozarbayjon–Oʻzbekiston 2027
- U Shape The Game

Tournament details
- Host country: Azerbaijan (Note: Azerbaijan's host status may change if UEFA's boycott of FIFA competitions over the FIFA Forward Enterprise proposal continues.); Uzbekistan
- Dates: 17 September – 9 October
- Teams: 24 (from 6 (Note: European teams may withdraw if UEFA's boycott of FIFA competitions over the FIFA Forward Enterprise proposal continues.) confederations)

The 2027 FIFA U-20 World Cup will be the 25th edition of the FIFA U-20 World Cup, the biennial international men's youth football championship contested by the under-20 national teams of the member associations of FIFA, since its inception in 1977 as the FIFA World Youth Championship. It will mark the 50th anniversary of the tournament.

The tournament will be co-hosted by Azerbaijan and Uzbekistan, who are both hosting their second FIFA tournament, having respectively hosted the 2012 FIFA U-17 Women's World Cup and the 2024 FIFA Futsal World Cup. It will also be the first FIFA youth tournament, as well as the second FIFA tournament overall, to be co-hosted by countries from two confederations, following the 2023 FIFA Women's World Cup in Australia and New Zealand.

Morocco are the defending champions.

== Host selection ==
The following countries expressed interest in bidding:

- Azerbaijan and Uzbekistan
- Indonesia and Singapore
- Peru

Azerbaijan and Uzbekistan were announced as the 2027 U-20 World Cup hosts following the FIFA Council meeting on 2 October 2025 in Zurich, Switzerland.

== Preparations ==
- On 15 December 2025, Azerbaijan set up their organising committee.

== Venues ==
Six venues will be used to host the competition, three in each host country. A new 55,000-seat stadium in Tashkent, Uzbekistan is being constructed to meet FIFA's minimum requirement of 50,000 seats for the semi-finals and final.

Uzbekistan
Tashkent	Location map of the Uzbek venues
New Tashkent Stadium	Location map of the Uzbek venues
Capacity: 55,000	Location map of the Uzbek venues

== Teams ==
A total of 24 teams qualify for the final tournament. In addition to Azerbaijan and Uzbekistan who qualified automatically as hosts, the other 22 teams will qualify from six separate continental competitions. On 2 October 2025, the FIFA Council approved an amended slot allocation which includes the first ever intercontinental play-off series for a FIFA youth tournament. The slot for the host nation will be taken directly from the quotas allocated to their confederation.

- AFC (Asia): 5 slots (including Uzbekistan)
- CAF (Africa): 4 slots
- CONCACAF (North America, Central America and the Caribbean): 4 slots
- CONMEBOL (South America): 4 slots
- OFC (Oceania): 1 slot
- UEFA (Europe): 5 slots (including Azerbaijan)
- Inter-confederation play-off tournament: 1 slot

A four-team play-off tournament will decide the final slot in the competition. The play-off slot allocation is as follows:

- AFC (Asia): 1 slot
- CONMEBOL (South America): 1 slot
- OFC (Oceania): Tahiti
- UEFA (Europe): Denmark (Note: Denmark may withdraw from the inter-confederation play-off tournament if UEFA's boycott of FIFA competitions over the FIFA Forward Enterprise proposal continues.)

The competition will be held at a neutral venue and will consist of two single leg semi-finals and a final, with the winner of the final qualifying.

=== Qualified teams ===
Qualifying tournament	Team	Qualification date	Appearance(s)				Previous best performance (Note: Bold text indicates they hosted that edition.)
Qualifying tournament	Team	Qualification date	Total	First	Last	Streak	Previous best performance
Host nation	Azerbaijan	2 October 2025	1st	Debut			
Host nation	Uzbekistan	2 October 2025	6th	2003	2023	1	Quarter-finals (2013, 2015)
2026 UEFA European Under-19 Championship	Germany	1 July 2026	12th	1981	2017	1	Champions (1981)
2026 UEFA European Under-19 Championship	Spain	1 July 2026	17th	1977	2025	2	Champions (1999)
2026 UEFA European Under-19 Championship	Ukraine	2 July 2026	6th	2001	2025	2	Champions (2019)
2026 UEFA European Under-19 Championship	Croatia	5 July 2026	4th	1999	2013	1	Round of 16 (1999, 2013)
2026 CONCACAF U-20 Championship	Costa Rica	4 August 2026	10th	1989	2017	1	Fourth place (2009)
2026 CONCACAF U-20 Championship	United States	4 August 2026	19th	1981	2025	7	Fourth place (1989)
2026 CONCACAF U-20 Championship	Canada	5 August 2026	9th	1979	2007	1	Quarter-finals (2003)
2026 CONCACAF U-20 Championship	Mexico	5 August 2026	18th	1977	2025	2	Runners-up (1977)
2026 OFC U-19 Championship	New Zealand	11 September 2026	9th	2007	2025	8	Round of 16 (2015, 2017, 2019, 2023)

== UEFA boycott ==
On 30 July 2026, following FIFA's announcement of FIFA Forward Enterprise (a proposal to sell stakes in FIFA's tournament operations, including for the U-20 World Cup, to private investors), all 55 UEFA member associations agreed on an indefinite boycott of FIFA competitions until the proposal was shelved and assurances were made that such a proposal would not be tabulated again. A day later on 31 July, the proposal was scrapped, although UEFA stated that, regardless, it no longer trusts FIFA's governance. Following written assurances that a similar proposal wouldn't be brought up, UEFA provisionally suspended its boycott for the 2026–27 season on August 27, although since the dates for U-20 World Cup fall under the 2027–28 season, the boycott is still technically ongoing.
