= 1997 OFC U-20 Championship =

Championnat d'Océanie de football des moins de 20 ans 1997

Tournament details
- Host country: Tahiti
- Dates: 4–10 January
- Teams: 4

Final positions
- Champions: Australia (8th title)
- Runners-up: New Zealand
- Third place: Fiji
- Fourth place: Tahiti

The OFC U-20 Championship 1997 was held in Tahiti. It also served as qualification for the 1997 FIFA World Youth Championship.

== Teams ==
The following teams entered the tournament:

- Australia
- Fiji
- New Zealand
- Tahiti (host)

== First round ==
Pos	Team	Pld	W	D	L	GF	GA	GD	Pts	Qualification
1	Australia	3	3	0	0	23	0	+23	9	Advance to Final
2	New Zealand	3	2	0	1	8	4	+4	6	Advance to Final
3	Fiji	3	1	0	2	5	15	−10	3	Advance to Third place play-off
4	Tahiti (H)	3	0	0	3	2	19	−17	0	Advance to Third place play-off

Source: RSSSF
(H) Hosts

4 January	Australia	10–0	Fiji
	Tahiti	0–5	New Zealand
6 January	Australia	3–0	New Zealand
	Tahiti	2–4	Fiji
8 January	New Zealand	3–1	Fiji
	Tahiti	0–10	Australia

== Third place play-off ==
10 January 1997

Fiji	1–1	Tahiti
Penalties
	5–4

Tahiti

== Final ==
10 January 1997

Australia	2–1	New Zealand

Tahiti

1997 OFC U-20 Championship

Australia
Eighth title

== Qualification to World Youth Championship ==
The tournament winner qualified for the 1997 FIFA World Youth Championship.

- Australia
