= 1990 OFC U-20 Championship =

Tournament details
- Host country: Fiji
- Teams: 5

Final positions
- Champions: Australia (6th title)
- Runners-up: New Zealand
- Third place: Vanuatu
- Fourth place: Tahiti

Tournament statistics
- Matches played: 10
- Goals scored: 36 (3.6 per match)

The OFC U-20 Championship 1990 was held in Fiji. It also served as qualification for the intercontinental play-off for the 1991 FIFA World Youth Championship.

== Teams ==
The following teams entered the tournament:

- Australia
- Fiji (host)
- New Zealand
- Tahiti
- Vanuatu

== Standings ==
Pos	Team	Pld	W	D	L	GF	GA	GD	Pts	Qualification
1	Australia	4	4	0	0	22	0	+22	8	Advance to Inter-continental play-off
2	New Zealand	4	2	0	2	5	9	−4	4	
3	Vanuatu	4	2	0	2	4	10	−6	4	
4	Tahiti	4	1	1	2	3	10	−7	3	
5	Fiji (H)	4	0	1	3	2	7	−5	1	

Source: RSSSF
(H) Hosts

== Matches ==
Australia	6–0	New Zealand
Australia	6–0	Vanuatu
Australia	7–0	Tahiti
Australia	3–0	Fiji
New Zealand	3–1	Vanuatu
New Zealand	0–1	Tahiti
New Zealand	2–1	Fiji
Vanuatu	2–1	Tahiti
Vanuatu	1–0	Fiji
Tahiti	1–1	Fiji

1990 OFC U-20 Championship

Australia
Sixth title

== Inter-continental play-off ==
Australia qualified for the 1991 FIFA World Youth Championship by beating Israel in an intercontinental play-off. Matches were played on 6 and 9 March 1991 in Sydney, Australia. Despite both matches being played in the same Australian city, Australia still won on away goals.

Team 1	Agg.	Team 2	1st leg	2nd leg
Australia	2–2	Israel	0–1	2–1
