= 1994 OFC U-20 Championship =

Tournament details
- Host country: Fiji
- Dates: 24 September – 3 October
- Teams: 8

Final positions
- Champions: Australia (7th title)
- Runners-up: New Zealand
- Third place: Solomon Islands
- Fourth place: Vanuatu

The OFC U-20 Championship 1994 was held in Fiji. It also served as qualification for the 1995 FIFA World Youth Championship.

== Teams ==
The following teams entered the tournament:

- Australia
- Fiji (host)
- New Zealand
- Papua New Guinea
- Western Samoa
- Solomon Islands
- Tahiti
- Vanuatu

== Group stage ==
=== Group A ===
Teams	Pld	W	D	L	GF	GA	GD	Pts
Australia	3	3	0	0	17	0	+17	9
Solomon Islands	3	2	0	1	5	7	–2	6
Tahiti	3	1	0	2	2	7	–5	3
Fiji	3	0	0	3	1	11	–10	0

24 September	Australia	5–0	Tahiti
	Fiji	1–3	Solomon Islands
26 September	Australia	5–0	Solomon Islands
	Fiji	0–1	Tahiti
28 September	Australia	7–0	Fiji
	Solomon Islands	2–1	Tahiti

=== Group B ===
Teams	Pld	W	D	L	GF	GA	GD	Pts
New Zealand	3	3	0	0	11	1	+10	9
Vanuatu	3	2	0	1	6	6	0	6
Western Samoa	3	1	0	2	2	6	–4	3
Papua New Guinea	3	0	0	3	0	6	–6	0

24 September	New Zealand	6–1	Vanuatu
	Western Samoa	2–0	Papua New Guinea
26 September	New Zealand	3–0	Western Samoa
	Vanuatu	2–0	Papua New Guinea
28 September	New Zealand	2–0	Papua New Guinea
	Western Samoa	0–3	Vanuatu

== Semifinals ==
1 October 1994

Australia	11–0	Vanuatu

Fiji
1 October 1994

New Zealand	1–0	Solomon Islands

Fiji

== Third place match ==
3 October 1994

Solomon Islands	0–0	Vanuatu
Penalties
	4–2

Fiji

== Final ==
3 October 1994

Australia	1–0	New Zealand

Fiji

1994 OFC U-20 Championship

Australia
Seventh title

== Qualification to World Youth Championship ==
The tournament winner qualified for the 1995 FIFA World Youth Championship.

- Australia
