= 1998 OFC U-20 Championship =

Tournament details
- Host country: Samoa
- Dates: 15–24 August
- Teams: 8

Final positions
- Champions: Australia (9th title)
- Runners-up: Fiji
- Third place: New Zealand
- Fourth place: Solomon Islands

The OFC U-20 Championship 1998 was held in Apia, Samoa. It also served as qualification for the 1999 FIFA World Youth Championship.

== Teams ==
The following teams entered the tournament:

- Australia
- American Samoa
- Fiji
- New Zealand
- Western Samoa (host)
- Solomon Islands
- Tonga
- Vanuatu

== Group stage ==
=== Group A ===
| Teams | Pld | W | D | L | GF | GA | GD | Pts |
|---|---|---|---|---|---|---|---|---|
| Australia | 3 | 3 | 0 | 0 | 18 | 0 | +18 | 9 |
| Fiji | 3 | 2 | 0 | 1 | 11 | 3 | +8 | 6 |
| Western Samoa | 3 | 1 | 0 | 2 | 1 | 12 | –11 | 3 |
| Tonga | 3 | 0 | 0 | 3 | 1 | 16 | –15 | 0 |

| 15 August | Australia | 2–0 | Fiji |
| | Western Samoa | 1–0 | Tonga |
| 18 August | Australia | 8–0 | Tonga |
| | Fiji | 4–0 | Western Samoa |
| 20 August | Western Samoa | 0–8 | Australia |
| | Tonga | 1–7 | Fiji |

=== Group B ===
| Teams | Pld | W | D | L | GF | GA | GD | Pts |
|---|---|---|---|---|---|---|---|---|
| Solomon Islands | 3 | 2 | 1 | 0 | 24 | 0 | +24 | 7 |
| New Zealand | 3 | 2 | 1 | 0 | 16 | 0 | +16 | 7 |
| Vanuatu | 3 | 1 | 0 | 2 | 15 | 9 | +6 | 3 |
| American Samoa | 3 | 0 | 0 | 3 | 0 | 46 | –46 | 0 |

| 15 August | New Zealand | 8–0 | Vanuatu |
| | American Samoa | 0–23 | Solomon Islands |
| 17 August | New Zealand | 8–0 | American Samoa |
| | Vanuatu | 0–1 | Solomon Islands |
| 19 August | New Zealand | 0–0 | Solomon Islands |
| | American Samoa | 0–15 | Vanuatu |

== Semifinals ==
22 August 1998

| Australia | 3–2 (a.e.t.) | New Zealand |

Apia
22 August 1998

| Solomon Islands | 1–2 | Fiji |

Apia

== Third place match ==
24 August 1998

| New Zealand | 2–1 | Solomon Islands |

Apia

== Final ==
24 August 1998

| Australia | 2–0 | Fiji |
|---|---|---|
| Simon Colosimo 39', 78' |

Apia

1998 OFC U-20 Championship

Australia
Ninth title

== Qualification to World Youth Championship ==
The tournament winner qualified for the 1999 FIFA World Youth Championship.

- Australia
