= 1974 OFC U-20 Championship =

Championnat d'Océanie de football des moins de 20 ans 1974

Tournament details
- Host country: Tahiti
- Dates: 8–14 December
- Teams: 4

Final positions
- Champions: Tahiti (1st title)
- Runners-up: New Zealand
- Third place: New Hebrides
- Fourth place: New Caledonia

Tournament statistics
- Matches played: 7
- Goals scored: 29 (4.14 per match)

The OFC U-20 Championship 1974 was held in Tahiti.

== Teams ==
The following teams entered the tournament:

- New Caledonia
- New Hebrides
- New Zealand
- Tahiti (host)

Fiji withdrew due to lack of funds. Taiwan had to withdraw due to the French government refusing to give out visas.

== Group stage ==
Teams	Pld	W	D	L	GF	GA	GD	Pts
New Zealand	3	3	0	0	13	3	+10	6
Tahiti	3	2	0	1	8	6	+2	4
New Hebrides	3	0	1	2	3	7	–4	1
New Caledonia	3	0	1	2	3	11	–8	1

8 December	New Zealand	4–2	New Caledonia
	Tahiti	2–1	New Hebrides
10 December	New Zealand	4–1	New Hebrides
	Tahiti	6–0	New Caledonia
12 December	New Caledonia	1–1	New Hebrides
	Tahiti	0–5	New Zealand

== Final ==
14 December 1974

Tahiti	2–0	New Zealand

Papeete

1974 OFC U-20 Championship

Tahiti
First title
