= 1992 OFC U-20 Championship =

Championnat d'Océanie de football des moins de 20 ans 1992

Tournament details
- Host country: Tahiti
- Dates: 22–30 August
- Teams: 5

Final positions
- Champions: New Zealand (2nd title)
- Runners-up: Tahiti
- Third place: Fiji
- Fourth place: Vanuatu

The OFC U-20 Championship 1992 was held in Papeete, Tahiti. It also served as qualification for the intercontinental play-off for the 1993 FIFA World Youth Championship.

== Teams ==
The following teams entered the tournament:

- Fiji
- New Zealand
- Papua New Guinea
- Tahiti (host)
- Vanuatu

== Matches ==
Teams	Pld	W	D	L	GF	GA	GD	Pts
New Zealand	4	4	0	0	8	1	+7	8
Tahiti	4	2	1	1	6	4	+2	5
Fiji	4	2	0	2	11	7	+4	4
Vanuatu	4	1	1	2	4	9	–5	3
Papua New Guinea	4	0	0	4	3	11	–8	0

22 August	Vanuatu	2–1	Papua New Guinea
	Fiji	1–2	New Zealand
24 August	Papua New Guinea	1–5	Fiji
	New Zealand	1–0	Tahiti
26 August	Fiji	1–3	Tahiti
	Vanuatu	0–3	New Zealand
28 August	Tahiti	1–1	Vanuatu
	New Zealand	2–0	Papua New Guinea
30 August	Papua New Guinea	1–2	Tahiti
	Vanuatu	1–4	Fiji

1992 OFC U-20 Championship

New Zealand
Second title

== Qualification to World Youth Championship ==
- Australia (host)

New Zealand failed to qualify for the 1993 FIFA World Youth Championship. They lost four matches in an intercontinental play-off to South Korea, Thailand, Saudi Arabia and Qatar (respectively 1–5, 0–2, 1–3 and 0–3). These matches were played in Dubai, Qatar in September and October, 1992.
