= 1988 OFC U-20 Championship =

Tournament details
- Host country: Fiji
- Dates: 3–10 September
- Teams: 7

Final positions
- Champions: Australia (5th title)
- Runners-up: New Zealand
- Third place: Taiwan
- Fourth place: Fiji

The OFC U-20 Championship 1988 was held in Suva, Fiji. It also served as qualification for the intercontinental play-offs for the 1989 FIFA World Youth Championship.

== Teams ==
The following teams entered the tournament:

- Australia
- Fiji (host)
- New Zealand
- Papua New Guinea
- Taiwan
- Western Samoa
- Vanuatu

== Group stage ==
=== Group 1 ===
Teams	Pld	W	D	L	GF	GA	GD	Pts
New Zealand	3	3	0	0	19	0	+19	6
Fiji	3	1	1	1	11	4	+7	3
Papua New Guinea	3	1	1	1	6	2	+4	3
Western Samoa	3	0	0	3	1	31	–30	0

3 September	Fiji	0–2	New Zealand
	Western Samoa	0–5	Papua New Guinea
5 September	Fiji	1–1	Papua New Guinea
	New Zealand	16–0	Western Samoa
6 September	Fiji	10–1	Western Samoa
	New Zealand	1–0	Papua New Guinea

=== Group 2 ===
Teams	Pld	W	D	L	GF	GA	GD	Pts
Australia	2	2	0	0	11	1	+10	4
Taiwan	2	1	0	1	4	8	–4	2
Vanuatu	2	0	0	2	2	8	–6	0

3 September	Taiwan	3–2	Vanuatu
5 September	Australia	5–0	Vanuatu
6 September	Australia	6–1	Taiwan

== Knockout stage ==
=== Semi-finals ===
8 September 1988

Australia	4–2	Fiji

Suva
8 September 1988

New Zealand	2–1	Taiwan

Suva

=== Third place play-off ===
10 September 1988

Taiwan	2–0	Fiji

Suva

=== Final ===
10 September 1988

Australia	1–0	New Zealand
Zoran Ilic 26'

Suva

1988 OFC U-20 Championship

Australia
Fifth title

== Qualification to World Youth Championship ==
Australia and New Zealand both failed to qualify for the 1989 FIFA World Youth Championship. They finished 3rd and 4th in an intercontinental play-off group with Syria and Qatar. All matches were played in Aleppo, Syria.

Teams	Pld	W	D	L	GF	GA	GD	Pts
Syria	3	2	1	0	3	0	+3	5
Qatar	3	1	2	0	2	1	+1	4
Australia	3	1	1	1	4	2	+2	3
New Zealand	3	0	0	3	0	6	–6	0

18 January	Australia	3–0	New Zealand
	Qatar	0–0	Syria
20 January	Australia	1–1	Qatar
	Syria	2–0	New Zealand
22 January	Qatar	1–0	New Zealand
	Syria	1–0	Australia
