= 2001 OFC U-20 Championship =

Championnat d'Océanie de football des moins de 20 ans 2001

Tournament details
- Host countries: Cook Islands; New Caledonia
- Dates: 8 February – 4 March
- Teams: 11 (from 1 confederation)
- Venue: 3 (in 2 host cities)

Final positions
- Champions: Australia (10th title)
- Runners-up: New Zealand
- Third place: Vanuatu
- Fourth place: Solomon Islands

Tournament statistics
- Matches played: 27
- Goals scored: 122 (4.52 per match)
- Top scorer: (Australia) Kevork Gulessarian (10 goals)

The 2001 OFC U-20 Championship was the thirteenth contested. It was won by Australia who qualified for the 2001 FIFA U-20 World Cup after defeating New Zealand 4–3 on aggregate.

== Participating teams ==
- Australia
- Cook Islands
- Fiji
- New Caledonia
- New Zealand
- Papua New Guinea
- Samoa
- Tahiti
- Tonga
- Solomon Islands
- Vanuatu

== First round ==
=== Group stage ===
==== Group A ====
Nation	Pts	Pld	W	D	L	GF	GA	GD
New Zealand	12	4	4	0	0	7	2	+5
Solomon Islands	9	4	3	0	1	12	2	+10
Fiji	6	4	2	0	2	4	4	0
Tahiti	3	4	1	0	3	9	15	–6
New Caledonia	0	4	0	0	4	4	13	–9

- American Samoa withdrew

New Zealand advanced to the play-off.

8 February 2001

New Zealand	3–1	Tahiti
Killen 44' (pen.); Sigmund 48'; Payne 52'		Tifinau 90'

Nouméa, New Caledonia
9 February 2001

Solomon Islands	3–0	New Caledonia

Nouméa, New Caledonia

10 February 2001

New Caledonia	1–2	New Zealand
Douepere 47'		Smeltz 5', 71'

Nouméa, New Caledonia
10 February 2001

Tahiti	1–2	Fiji
Sang		Turagalani; Kumar

Nouméa, New Caledonia

12 February 2001

New Caledonia	1–2	Fiji
Kabeu 90+2'		Honakoko 3' (o.g.); Kumar 72'

Nouméa, New Caledonia
12 February 2001

New Zealand	1–0	Solomon Islands
Smeltz 33'

Nouméa, New Caledonia

14 February 2001

Solomon Islands	8–1	Tahiti

Nouméa, New Caledonia
14 February 2001

New Zealand	1–0	Fiji
Patrick 75'

Nouméa, New Caledonia

16 February 2001

Fiji	0–1	Solomon Islands
		Fa'arodo 83'

Nouméa, New Caledonia
16 February 2001

New Caledonia	2–6	Tahiti
Douepere 1', 19'		Vallar 14'; Teamo 17', 62'; Devendeville 46'; Flores 80'; Bennett 82'

Nouméa, New Caledonia

==== Group B ====
Nation	Pts	Pld	W	D	L	GF	GA	GD
Australia	15	5	5	0	0	46	0	+46
Vanuatu	12	5	4	0	1	23	4	+19
Samoa	6	5	2	0	3	6	22	–16
Cook Islands	4	5	1	1	3	3	21	–18
Tonga	4	5	1	1	3	3	21	–18
Papua New Guinea	3	5	1	0	4	5	18	–13

Australia advanced to the play-off.

15 February 2001

Vanuatu	7–0	Papua New Guinea
Waiwai 10', 27', 44'; Maki 28', 50'; King 60'; Qoring 64'

Tereora National Stadium, Rarotonga
15 February 2001

Tonga	1–1	Cook Islands
Simioni 59'		Shepherd 4' (pen.)

Tereora National Stadium, Rarotonga
15 February 2001

Australia	16–0	Samoa
Milicevic 12'; Owens 15'; McDonald 28', 39', 43', 52', 60'; Ferrante 34' (pen.), 53' (pen.), 64' (pen.); Unknown 57' (o.g.); Carle 59', 62'; Wilkshire 76', 90'; Gulessarian 83'

Tereora National Stadium, Rarotonga

17 February 2001

Australia	7–0	Tonga
Milicevic 12', 34', 40'; Gulessarian 13'; Owens 16', 37'; Wilkshire 55' (pen.)

Tereora National Stadium, Rarotonga
17 February 2001

Samoa	0–3	Vanuatu
		Waiwai 52'; Vava 62'; Maki 65'

Tereora National Stadium, Rarotonga
17 February 2001

Papua New Guinea	4–0	Cook Islands
Habuka 7'; Wasi 33'; Lepani 74', 85'

Tereora National Stadium, Rarotonga

20 February 2001

Samoa	3–0	Tonga
Fa'aivosa 16'; Timo 65'; Duffy 74'

Raemaru Park, Rarotonga
20 February 2001

Vanuatu	3–0	Cook Islands
Obed 20', 74' (pen.); Tom 88'

Raemaru Park, Rarotonga
20 February 2001

Australia	6–0	Papua New Guinea
Pantelis 11'; Kisnorbo 24'; McDonald 39'; Ferrante 42' (pen.); Elrich 62'; Carle 65'

Raemaru Park, Rarotonga

21 February 2001

Australia	13–0	Cook Islands
Owens 3'; Kennedy 4', 29'; Gulessarian 23', 46', 60', 76', 85', 87', 88'; Ferrante 28'; Last 34'; Milicevic 67'

Raemaru Park, Rarotonga
21 February 2001

Vanuatu	10–0	Tonga
Dick 4'; Sope 32'; Alick 47'; Yelou 55', 61', 66', 77'; Tam 58', 64'; Tom 90'

Raemaru Park, Rarotonga
21 February 2001

Papua New Guinea	1–3	Samoa
Unknown 10'		Fa'aivosa 16'; Timo 65'; Duffy 74'

Raemaru Park, Rarotonga

23 February 2001

Tonga	2–0	Papua New Guinea

Tereora National Stadium, Rarotonga
23 February 2001

Samoa	0–2 (awarded)	Cook Islands

Tereora National Stadium, Rarotonga
- Samoa withdrew
23 February 2001

Australia	4–0	Vanuatu
Ferrante 18'; Carle 63'; Elrich 73'; Owens 80'

Tereora National Stadium, Rarotonga

== Final ==
Team 1	Agg.	Team 2	1st leg	2nd leg
New Zealand	3–4	Australia	2–1	1–3 (a.e.t.)

28 February 2001

New Zealand	2–1	Australia
Rowe 76'; Killen 86'		Gulesserian 21'

Auckland
4 March 2001

Australia	3–1 (a.e.t.)	New Zealand
Owens 37'; Milicevic 80'; McDonald 101'		Killen 17'

Coffs Harbour
- Australia qualified for the 2001 FIFA World Youth Championship

2001 OFC U-20 Championship

Australia
Tenth title

== See also ==
- 2001 FIFA World Youth Championship
