= 2005 OFC U-20 Championship =

Tournament details
- Host country: Solomon Islands
- Dates: 21–30 January
- Teams: 8 (from 1 confederation)
- Venues: 2 (in 1 host city)

Final positions
- Champions: Australia (12th title)
- Runners-up: Solomon Islands
- Third place: Vanuatu
- Fourth place: Fiji

Tournament statistics
- Matches played: 16
- Goals scored: 103 (6.44 per match)
- Top scorer(s): (Australia) Mark Bridge (Solomon Islands) Alick Maemae (Australia) Jay Lucas (5 goals)

The 2005 OFC U-20 Championship was the fifteenth contested. It was won by Australia who qualified for the 2005 FIFA U-20 World Cup after a 3–0 victory against the Solomon Islands played at Lawson Tama Stadium in Honiara, Solomon Islands. The final game was abandoned in the 77th minute due to crowd trouble, however the score was allowed to stand. This was the last time Australia contested OFC U-20 Championship, as they moved to the AFC since 2006.

== Participating teams ==
- Australia
- Solomon Islands
- New Zealand
- Tonga
- Fiji
- New Caledonia
- Samoa
- Vanuatu

== Squads ==
=== Australia ===
1. Danny Vukovic (Central Coast Mariners)
2. Mark Milligan (Sydney FC)
3. Trent McClenahan (West Ham United)
4. Adrian Leijer (Melbourne Victory)
5. Jacob Timpano (Sydney FC)
6. Stuart Musialik (Newcastle Jets)
7. Vince Lia (Melbourne Victory)
8. Blagoja Celeski (Perth Glory)
9. Jay Lucas (Marconi Stallions)
10. Kristian Sarkies (Melbourne Victory)
11. Chris Tadrosse (Melbourne Victory)
12. Justin Pasfield (Sydney FC)
13. Aaron Downes (Chesterfield FC)
14. Spase Dilevski (Tottenham Hotspur)
15. Ryan Townsend
16. Ruben Zadkovich
17. Nick Ward (Perth Glory)
18. Adam Federici
19. David Williams
20. James Wesolowski

=== New Zealand ===
1. Jacob Spoonley (Auckland City FC)
2. Cole Tinkler (New Zealand Knights)
3. Lj Pijnenburg
4. Michael Mayne
5. Steven Old (St. John's University)
6. Nadir Harrat
7. Jeremy Brockie (New Zealand Knights)
8. Sam Matthews
9. Kris Bright (Waitakere United)
10. Michael Gwyther
11. Prince Quanash
12. Jason Rowley
13. Joel Matthews
14. Hone Fowler
15. Sam Jasper (Waitakere United)
16. Ian Hogg (Central United)
17. Jason Hayne (Auckland City FC)
18. Elliot Stead
19. Croydon Wheeler
20. Roy Bell

== Matches ==
=== Group stage ===
==== Group A ====
Nation	Pts	Pld	W	D	L	GF	GA	GD
Australia	9	3	3	0	0	40	3	+37
Vanuatu	6	3	2	0	1	7	11	−4
New Caledonia	3	3	1	0	2	10	16	−6
Tonga	0	3	0	0	3	1	28	−27

- Cook Islands withdrew

Australia and Vanuatu progressed to the semi-finals.

New Caledonia and Tonga were eliminated.

22 January 2005

Australia	12–1	New Caledonia
Musialik 6', 26'; Lia 7'; Bridge 9', 50', 62'; Dilevski 24'; Lucas 40', 64', 66'; Leijer 57'; Sarkies 90+1'		(?)

Lawson Tama Stadium, Honiara
22 January 2005

Tonga	0–2	Vanuatu

Lawson Tama Stadium, Honiara

24 January 2005

New Caledonia	2–3	Vanuatu

Lawson Tama Stadium, Honiara

25 January 2005

Tonga	0–19	Australia

AE Oval

27 January 2005

Australia	9–2	Vanuatu
Lia 1'; Lagana 14', 23'; Lucas 21' (pen.), 26' (pen.); Sarkies 48', 82'; Ward 49'; Williams 79'		Joe 60'; Ismael 66'

Lawson Tama Stadium, Honiara
27 January 2005

New Caledonia	7–1	Tonga
Gael 12', 46'; Kalaye 18'; Saridjan 34'; Stanley (??); Albert (??)		Teu 20'

Lawson Tama Stadium, Honiara

==== Group B ====
Nation	Pts	Pld	W	D	L	GF	GA	GD
Solomon Islands	9	3	3	0	0	9	1	+8
Fiji	6	3	2	0	1	10	2	+8
New Zealand	3	3	1	0	2	8	3	+5
Samoa	0	3	0	0	3	1	22	−21

- American Samoa withdrew

The Solomon Islands and Fiji progressed to the semi-finals.

New Zealand and Samoa were eliminated.

21 January 2005

New Zealand	0–1	Fiji
		Muduliar 11'

Lawson Tama Stadium, Honiara
21 January 2005

Samoa	0–6	Solomon Islands
		Totori 9', 39'; Maemae 37', 64', 65'; Ratu 87'

Lawson Tama Stadium, Honiara

23 January 2005

New Zealand	7–0	Samoa
Bright 10' o.g. 14'; Gwyther 18', 48'; Hogg 37'; Hayne 71', 76'

Lawson Tama Stadium, Honiara
23 January 2005

Solomon Islands	1–0	Fiji
Totori 10'

Lawson Tama Stadium, Honiara

26 January 2005

Samoa	1–9	Fiji
Ki Anufe 77'		Vakatalesau 3', 22', 27', 44'; Ali 10'; Rao 35'; Dunadamu 42', 86'; Shankaran 75'

Lawson Tama Stadium, Honiara
26 January 2005

Solomon Islands	2–1	New Zealand
Totori 17'; Bebu 34'		Hayne 81'

Lawson Tama Stadium, Honiara

=== Knockout Phase ===
Semi-finals
29 January – Lawson Tama Stadium
Australia	3
Fiji	2
29 January – Lawson Tama Stadium
Solomon Islands	3
Vanuatu	1

Final
30 January – Lawson Tama Stadium
Australia	3
Solomon Islands	0
Third place
31 January – Lawson Tama Stadium
Fiji	1
Vanuatu	4

==== Semi finals ====
29 January 2005

Australia	3–2	Fiji
Bridge 13'; Williams 64'; Sarkies 89'	Report	Tiwa 38'; Tuvura 76'

Lawson Tama Stadium

29 January 2005

Solomon Islands	3–1 (a.e.t)	Vanuatu
Maemae 10', 120+2'; Unknown 96' (o.g.)	Report	Maleb 62'

Lawson Tama Stadium

==== Third place match ====
31 January 2005

Fiji	1–4	Vanuatu
Tuvura 19'	Report	Simeon 5'; Ismael 18'; Ligo 70'; Maleb 78'

Lawson Tama Stadium

==== Final ====
30 January 2005

Australia	3–0 (77th minute)	Solomon Islands
Bridge 8' (pen.); Lia 58'; Williams 74'	Report

Lawson Tama Stadium
Attendance: 21,000

Australia qualified for the 2005 FIFA U-20 World Cup

2005 OFC U-20 Championship

Australia
Twelfth title

== Goalscorers ==
This list is not complete, as there are several missing match reports.

5 goals

- (Solomon Islands) Alick Maemae
- (Australia) Mark Bridge
- (Australia) Jay Lucas

4 goals

- (Fiji) Osea Vakatalesau
- (Solomon Islands) Benjamin Totori
- (Australia) Kristian Sarkies

3 goals

- (New Zealand) Jason Hayne
- (Australia) David Williams
- (Australia) Vince Lia

2 goals

- (Fiji) Apisalome Tuvura
- (Fiji) Maciu Samaidrawa Dunadamu
- (New Zealand) Michael Gwyther
- (Vanuatu) Jean Maleb
- (Vanuatu) Alick Ismael

1 goal

- (New Zealand) Kris Bright
- (New Zealand) Stuart Hogg
- (Vanuatu) Charles Ligo
- (Vanuatu) John Simeon
- (Fiji) Malakai Tiwa
- (Fiji) Sumeet Shankaran
- (Fiji) Johnny Rao
- (Fiji) Nayzal Ali
- (Solomon Islands) Goodwin Bebeu
- (Samoa) Ki Anufe

== See also ==
2005 FIFA World Youth Championship
