= Vanuatu national under-20 football team =

National football team

Vanuatu U20
- Association: Vanuatu Football Federation
- Confederation: OFC (Oceania)
- Head coach: (Vanuatu) Francois Sakama
- Captain: Bong Kalo
- Most caps: Bong Kalo (13)
- Top scorer: Jean Kaltak (9)
- FIFA code: VAN
First colours	Second colours

First international
- (French Polynesia) Tahiti 2–1 New Hebrides (Papeete, Tahiti; December 8, 1974)

Biggest win
- American Samoa 0–15 Vanuatu (Apia, Samoa; August 19, 1998)

Biggest defeat
- Fiji 11–0 Vanuatu (Suva, Fiji; October 1, 1994)

World Cup
- Appearances: 1 (first in 2017)
- Best result: Group Stage (2017)

OFC U-19 Men's Championship
- Appearances: 16 (1974, 1988, 1990, 1992, 1994, 1998, 2001, 2002, 2005, 2007, 2011, 2013, 2014, 2016, 2018, 2022)
- Best result: Runners-up (2014, 2016)

The Vanuatu national under-20 football team is the national U-20 team of Vanuatu and is controlled by the Vanuatu Football Federation. It was known as the New Hebrides national under-20 football team until 1980, when the New Hebrides gained their independence and renamed their country to Vanuatu.

== History ==
The Vanuatu national under-20 football team took part in the OFC U-20 Championship tournament 14 times (1974, 1988, 1990, 1992, 1994, 1998, 2001, 2002, 2005, 2007, 2011, 2013, 2014 and 2016). In 2014, the team got the best result with a second place as they finished behind Fiji. Two years later, they would qualify for the 2017 FIFA U-20 World Cup after defeating the Solomon Islands in the semifinals to book a spot and compete at their first ever FIFA tournament.

== Competitive record ==
=== FIFA U-20 World Cup record ===
FIFA U-20 World Cup record
Year	Round	Position	GP	W	D	L	GF	GA
1977–2015	Did not qualify							
(South Korea) 2017	Group stage	24th	3	0	0	3	4	13
2019–2027	Did not qualify							
(Armenia) (Georgia (country)) 2029	To be determined							
Total	Group stage	1/26	3	0	0	3	4	13

=== OFC ===
The OFC Under 20 Qualifying Tournament is a tournament held once every two years to decide the only two qualification spots for the Oceania Football Confederation (OFC) and its representatives at the FIFA U-20 World Cup.

OFC U-19 Men's Championship
Year	Round	Pld	W	D	L	GF	GA
as New Hebrides
(French Polynesia) 1974	Third place	3	0	1	2	3	7
(Australia) 1978	Did not enter						
as Vanuatu
(Fiji) 1980	Did not enter						
(Papua New Guinea) 1982	Did not enter						
(Australia) 1985	Did not enter						
(New Zealand) 1986	Did not enter						
(Fiji) 1988	Group stage	2	0	0	2	2	8
(Fiji) 1990	Third place	4	2	0	2	4	10
(French Polynesia) 1992	Fourth place	4	1	1	2	4	9
(Fiji) 1994	Fourth place	4	2	0	2	6	6
(French Polynesia) 1997	Did not compete						
(Samoa) 1998	Group stage	3	1	0	2	15	9
(New Caledonia) (Cook Islands) 2001	Group stage	5	4	0	1	23	4
(Vanuatu) (Fiji) 2002	Group stage	2	0	1	1	2	4
(Solomon Islands) 2005	Third place	5	3	0	2	12	15
(New Zealand) 2007	Group stage	6	1	2	3	8	17
(French Polynesia) 2008	Did not enter						
(New Zealand) 2011	Third place	5	4	0	1	19	5
(Fiji) 2013	Third place	4	2	0	2	12	7
(Fiji) 2014	Runners-up	5	3	2	0	11	4
(Tonga) (Vanuatu) 2016	Runners-up	5	4	0	1	7	7
(Cook Islands) (French Polynesia) 2018	Group stage	3	0	0	3	2	11
(French Polynesia) 2022	Quarter-finals	3	0	0	3	0	7
(Vanuatu) (Samoa) 2024	7th place	4	1	0	3	4	10
(Samoa) 2026	8th place	4	0	1	3	4	17
Total	Runners-up	71	28	8	35	138	157

Vanuatu's starting line-up against New Zealand, OFC U-20 Championship 2016

=== Current technical staff ===
Position	
Head coach	(Vanuatu) Francois Sakama
Team Manager	(Vanuatu) Peter Takaro
High Performance Coach	(France) David Laurent Baltase
Assistant coach 1	(Vanuatu) Kaison Maki
Assistant coach 2	(Vanuatu) Vital Bong
Team Manager	(Vanuatu) Peter Takaro
Goalkeeper coach & Kit Manager	(Vanuatu) Obed Jimmy
Doctor	(Vanuatu) Basil Leodoro
Physio	(Vanuatu) Albert Kaipam

Vanuatu at the 2017 FIFA U-20 World Cup before a match against Mexico at the Daejeon World Cup Stadium in Daejeon, South Korea.

== Current squad ==
The following players were called up for the 2022 OFC U-19 Championship from 7 to 20 September 2022. Names in italics denote players who have been capped for the Senior team.

Caps and goals as of 20 September 2022 after the game against Tahiti.

No.	Pos.	Player	Date of birth (age)	Caps	Goals	Club
1	GK	Brendon Tankon	24 July 2003 (age 23)	1	0	(Vanuatu Football Federation) Teouma Academy
22	GK	Markson Kalsrap	8 April 2003 (age 23)	0	0	(Vanuatu Football Federation) Mauriki
26	GK	Alison Hungai	26 June 2004 (age 22)	0	0	(Vanuatu Football Federation) ABM Galaxy
2	DF	Quinton Tawia	19 April 2004 (age 22)	0	0	(Vanuatu Football Federation) Amicale
3	DF	Enock James	12 January 2004 (age 22)	1	0	(Vanuatu Football Federation) ABM Galaxy
4	DF	Edward Roqara	16 April 2004 (age 22)	1	0	(Vanuatu Football Federation) Erakor Golden Star
5	DF	Daniel Roro	12 April 2004 (age 22)	1	0	(Vanuatu Football Federation) VFF Academy
13	DF	Bathis Nalau	5 May 2004 (age 22)	1	0	(Vanuatu Football Federation) Teouma Academy
16	DF	Bob Bae	14 December 2003 (age 22)	1	0	(Vanuatu Football Federation) VFF Academy
17	DF	Nicholas King	14 April 2004 (age 22)	1	0	(Vanuatu Football Federation) Tafea
24	DF	Brian Pakoa	13 August 2004 (age 22)	0	0	(Vanuatu Football Federation) Amicale
25	DF	Luis Ute	2 September 2003 (age 23)	0	0	(Vanuatu Football Federation) All Reds Youth
6	MF	Shem Sopuso	19 October 2003 (age 22)	1	0	(Vanuatu Football Federation) VFF Academy
7	MF	Jerison John	2 April 2003 (age 23)	1	0	(Vanuatu Football Federation) VFF Academy
8	MF	Jordan Nirua	1 January 2003 (age 23)	0	0	(Vanuatu Football Federation) VFF Academy
10	MF	Chima Chillia	24 December 2003 (age 22)	1	0	(Vanuatu Football Federation) Tupuji Imere
12	MF	Gerard Avock	21 December 2004 (age 21)	1	0	(Vanuatu Football Federation) Mauriki
15	MF	Solo Namani	6 October 2004 (age 22)	0	0	(Vanuatu Football Federation) VFF Academy
18	MF	Thomas Maliwan	26 January 2005 (age 21)	1	0	(Vanuatu Football Federation) Tafea
19	MF	Ron Takau	25 July 2004 (age 22)	0	0	(Vanuatu Football Federation) Erakor Golden Star
21	MF	Newton Tabe	9 February 2004 (age 22)	1	0	(Vanuatu Football Federation) Amicale
23	MF	Roger Waoute	14 July 2003 (age 23)	0	0	(Vanuatu Football Federation) Erakor Golden Star
9	FW	Bill Willie	16 November 2004 (age 21)	0	0	(Vanuatu Football Federation) VFF Academy
11	FW	Tari Laurentin	27 July 2003 (age 23)	1	0	(Vanuatu Football Federation) United Malampa
14	FW	AJ Rozach Zakarie	19 April 2004 (age 22)	1	0	(Vanuatu Football Federation) Erakor Golden Star
20	FW	Sergio Waoute	3 November 2006 (age 19)	0	0	(Vanuatu Football Federation) Erakor Golden Star

== Head-to-head record ==
The following table shows Vanuatu's head-to-head record in the FIFA U-20 World Cup.

Opponent	Pld	W	D	L	GF	GA	GD	Win %
Germany	1	0	0	1	2	3	−1	0.00
Mexico	1	0	0	1	2	3	−1	0.00
Venezuela	1	0	0	1	0	7	−7	0.00
Total	3	0	0	3	4	13	−9	0.00

== List of coaches ==
- (Vanuatu) Moise Poida (2011–2013)
- (Vanuatu) Etienne Mermer (2014–2016)
- (New Zealand) Declan Edge (2016)
- (Canada) Dejan Gluščević (2017)
- (Northern Ireland) Paul Munster (2019)
- (Vanuatu) Kaison Maki (2019–2022)
- (Vanuatu) Francois Sakama (2022-)
