= New Caledonia national under-20 football team =

New Caledonia U20
- Nickname: Les Cagous (The Kagus)
- Association: New Caledonian Football Federation
- Confederation: OFC (Oceania)
- Head coach: (New Caledonia) Pierre Wajoka
- Captain: Cyril Drawilo
- Most caps: Cyril Drawilo (8)
- Top scorer: Valentin Nyikeine, Raphael Oiremon & Cyril Drawilo (4)
- FIFA code: NCL
First colours	Second colours

First international
- New Zealand 4–2 New Caledonia (Papeete, Tahiti; 8 December 1974)

Biggest win
- New Caledonia 9–0 American Samoa (Suva, Fiji; 31 May 2014)

Biggest defeat
- Australia 12–1 New Caledonia (Honiara, Solomon Islands; 22 January 2005); New Zealand 10–0 New Caledonia (Auckland, New Zealand; 25 April 2011)

World Cup
- Appearances: 1 (first in 2025)

OFC U-19 Men's Championship
- Appearances: 13 (first in 1974)
- Best result: 2nd Place (2008, 2024)

The New Caledonia national under-20 football team is the national U-20 team of New Caledonia and is controlled by the New Caledonian Football Federation.

== Competition record ==
=== OFC ===
The OFC Under 20 Qualifying Tournament is a tournament held once every two years to decide the two qualification spots for the Oceania Football Confederation (OFC) and its representatives at the FIFA U-20 World Cup.

OFC Under 20 Qualifying Tournament
Year	Round	Position	Pld	W	D	L	GF	GA
(French Polynesia) 1974	Fourth place	4th	3	0	1	2	3	11
(New Zealand) 1978	Did not enter							
(Fiji) 1980	Fourth place	4th	2	1	0	1	3	7
(Papua New Guinea) 1982	Did not enter							
(Australia) 1985	Did not enter							
(New Zealand) 1986	Did not enter							
(Fiji) 1988	Did not enter							
(Fiji) 1990	Did not enter							
(French Polynesia) 1992	Did not enter							
(Fiji) 1994	Did not enter							
(New Zealand) 1997	Did not enter							
(Samoa) 1998	Did not enter							
(New Caledonia) (Cook Islands) 2001	Group stage		4	0	0	4	4	13
(Vanuatu) (Fiji) 2002	Group stage		4	2	0	2	12	10
(Solomon Islands) 2005	Group stage		3	1	0	2	10	16
(New Zealand) 2007	Fourth place	4th	6	3	0	3	11	6
(French Polynesia) 2008	Runners-up	2nd	3	1	2	0	5	2
(New Zealand) 2011	Group stage		2	0	0	2	1	13
(Fiji) 2013	Fourth place	4th	4	1	0	3	15	13
(Fiji) 2014	Third place	3rd	5	3	0	2	17	5
(Vanuatu) 2016	Semi-finals	3rd	4	1	1	2	6	5
(French Polynesia) 2018	Third place	3rd	5	2	1	2	16	8
(French Polynesia) 2022	Third place	3rd	4	3	1	1	9	2
(Samoa) 2024	Runners-up	2nd	5	3	0	2	7	11
Total	Runners-up		49	18	6	26	112	111

=== FIFA U-20 World Cup ===
Year	Round	Position	Pld	W	D	L	GF	GA
(Tunisia) 1977	Did not qualify							
(Japan) 1979	Did not qualify							
(Australia) 1981	Did not qualify							
(Mexico) 1983	Did not qualify							
(Soviet Union) 1985	Did not qualify							
(Chile) 1987	Did not qualify							
(Saudi Arabia) 1989	Did not qualify							
(Portugal) 1991	Did not qualify							
(Australia) 1993	Did not qualify							
(Qatar) 1995	Did not qualify							
(Malaysia) 1997	Did not qualify							
(Nigeria) 1999	Did not qualify							
(Argentina) 2001	Did not qualify							
(United Arab Emirates) 2003	Did not qualify							
(Netherlands) 2005	Did not qualify							
(Canada) 2007	Did not qualify							
(Egypt) 2009	Did not qualify							
(Colombia) 2011	Did not qualify							
(Turkey) 2013	Did not qualify							
(New Zealand) 2015	Did not qualify							
(South Korea) 2017	Did not qualify							
(Poland) 2019	Did not qualify							
(Argentina) 2023	Did not qualify							
(Chile) 2025	Group stage	24th	3	0	0	3	1	20
(Azerbaijan) (Uzbekistan) 2027	Did not qualify							
(Armenia) (Georgia (country)) 2029	To be determined							
Total	1/26		3	0	0	3	1	20

== Current squad ==
The following players have been called up for the squad for the 2018 OFC U-19 Championship from 5 to 18 August 2018. Names in italics denote players who have been capped for the Senior team.

No.	Pos.	Player	Date of birth (age)	Caps	Goals	Club
1	GK	Unë Kecine	6 May 2001 (age 25)	5	0	(New Caledonian Football Federation) Auteuil-Dumbea
20	GK	Christopher Yeiwene	24 December 2000 (age 25)	1	0	(New Caledonian Football Federation) Hienghène Sport
2	DF	Martin Makam	15 September 2001 (age 25)	3	0	(New Caledonian Football Federation) Magenta
4	DF	Jean-Baptiste Caroine	3 September 1999 (age 27)	3	0	(New Caledonian Football Federation) Horizon Sport du Patho
5	DF	Kiam Wanesse	5 November 2001 (age 24)	5	0	(New Caledonian Football Federation) Wetr
6	DF	Jules Omei	14 July 2001 (age 25)	1	0	(New Caledonian Football Federation) Mont-Dore
12	DF	Armand Harper	2 June 1999 (age 27)	4	0	(New Caledonian Football Federation) Auteuil-Dumbea
17	DF	Georges Wakanumune	20 March 2001 (age 25)	1	0	(New Caledonian Football Federation) Auteuil-Dumbea
19	DF	Josua Hlemu	7 December 2000 (age 25)	3	0	(New Caledonian Football Federation) Auteuil-Dumbea
21	DF	Lucas Bitaud	6 January 1999 (age 27)	5	0	(New Caledonian Football Federation) Mont-Dore
7	MF	Titouan Richard	4 December 2000 (age 25)	4	2	(New Caledonian Football Federation) Mont-Dore
8	MF	Cyril Drawilo	11 April 2000 (age 26)	8	4	(New Caledonian Football Federation) Mont-Dore
10	MF	Pierre Bako	9 August 2001 (age 25)	5	2	(Tahitian Football Federation) Central Sport
13	MF	Pierre Wawia	13 March 2000 (age 26)	4	1	(New Caledonian Football Federation) Horizon Sport du Patho
15	MF	Neil Wahiobe	6 January 2000 (age 26)	4	0	(New Caledonian Football Federation) Drehu
16	MF	Leonard Makalu	20 April 1999 (age 27)	2	0	(New Caledonian Football Federation) Gaïtcha
9	FW	Jean-Jacques Katrawa	2 August 1999 (age 27)	3	1	(New Caledonian Football Federation) Gaïtcha
11	FW	Vita Longue	25 November 2000 (age 25)	4	2	(New Caledonian Football Federation) Magenta
14	FW	Paul Gope-Fenepej	10 August 2000 (age 26)	4	2	(French Football Federation) Poitiers
18	FW	Raoul Wenisso	20 July 2000 (age 26)	5	1	(New Caledonian Football Federation) Lössi

== Head-to-head record ==
The following table shows New Caledonia's head-to-head record in the FIFA U-20 World Cup.

Opponent	Pld	W	D	L	GF	GA	GD	Win %
France	1	0	0	1	0	6	−6	0.00
South Africa	1	0	0	1	0	5	−5	0.00
United States	1	0	0	1	1	9	−8	0.00
Total	3	0	0	3	1	20	−19	0.00
