= 1982 in Australian soccer =

Soccer in Australia
- Season: 1982

Men's soccer
- National Soccer League: Sydney City
- NSL Cup: APIA Leichhardt
- Charity Shield: Sydney City

The 1982 season was the 13th season of national competitive soccer in Australia and 99th overall.

== National teams ==
=== Australia men's national soccer team ===
==== Results and fixtures ====
===== Friendlies =====
6 October 1982	Thailand	0–4	Australia	Kallang, Singapore
		Report	O'Connor ?'; Kosmina 46', 79'; Cole 71'	Stadium: National Stadium; Attendance: 3,000; Referee: N. Chandra (Singapore)

11 October 1982	Indonesia	0–2	Australia	Singapore
		Report	Mitchell 73', 77'	Attendance: 5,000; Referee: Lee Kok Leong (Singapore)

14 October 1982	Malaysia	0–5	Australia	Kallang, Singapore
	Katholos 19', 37'; Kosmina 56'; O'Connor 64'; Cole 77'	Report		Stadium: National Stadium; Attendance: 12,000

17 October 1982	Malaysia	2–3	Australia	Kallang, Singapore
	Jae-suk 59'; Seun-chang 83'	Report	O'Connor 17'; Mitchell 34'; Christopoulos 61'	Stadium: National Stadium; Attendance: 25,000; Referee: N. Chandra (Singapore)

=== Australia men's national under-20 soccer team ===
==== Results and fixtures ====
===== 1982 OFC U-20 Championship =====
====== First round ======
Pos	Team	Pld	W	D	L	GF	GA	GD	Pts	Qualification
1	Australia	3	3	0	0	11	1	+10	6	Advance to Final
2	New Zealand	3	2	0	1	13	2	+11	4	Advance to Final
3	Papua New Guinea (H)	3	0	1	2	1	9	−8	1	Advance to Third place play-off
4	Fiji	3	0	1	2	1	14	−13	1	Advance to Third place play-off

Source: RSSSF
(H) Hosts

December 1982	Australia	7–0	Fiji	Papua New Guinea
		Report

7 December 1982	Australia	2–1	New Zealand	Papua New Guinea
		Report

December 1982	Papua New Guinea	0–2	Australia	Papua New Guinea
		Report

====== Final ======
12 December 1982	Australia	4–3 (a.e.t.)	New Zealand	Papua New Guinea
	Farina 75', 80'; Lowe 92', 98'	Report	Tuaa 10' (pen.), 21'; McClennan 110'	Referee: Ian Mole (Papua New Guinea)

== Domestic soccer ==
=== National Soccer League ===
Pos	Team	Pld	W	D	L	GF	GA	GD	Pts	Relegation
1	Sydney City (C)	30	20	5	5	68	28	+40	45	Qualification to Finals series (Note: The Finals series was not considered the championship for the 1982 National Soccer League.)
2	St George-Budapest	30	14	8	8	47	40	+7	36	Qualification to Finals series
3	Wollongong City	30	16	3	11	43	46	−3	35	Qualification to Finals series
4	Heidelberg United	30	13	8	9	42	37	+5	34	Qualification to Finals series
5	Preston Makedonia	30	12	10	8	45	41	+4	34	
6	South Melbourne	30	11	9	10	46	37	+9	31	
7	APIA Leichhardt	30	12	7	11	49	54	−5	31	
8	Sydney Olympic	30	12	6	12	52	42	+10	30	
9	West Adelaide	30	10	8	12	44	40	+4	28	
10	Marconi Fairfield	30	12	4	14	44	43	+1	28	
11	Brisbane Lions	30	10	8	12	39	42	−3	28	
12	Newcastle KB United	30	10	7	13	43	52	−9	27	
13	Adelaide City	30	6	12	12	36	44	−8	24	
14	Footscray JUST	30	5	14	11	34	46	−12	24	
15	Canberra City	30	7	10	13	37	54	−17	24	
16	Brisbane City	30	5	11	14	32	55	−23	21	

Source: rsssf.com
Rules for classification: 1) points; 2) goal difference; 3) number of goals scored.
(C) Champions

=== Cup competitions ===
==== NSL Cup ====
===== Final =====
12 September 1982
15:00 AEST

Heidelberg United	1–2	APIA Leichhardt
Campbell 63'	Report	McBreen 79'; Butler 85'

Olympic Park, Melbourne
Attendance: 5,000
Referee: Don Campbell

==== Charity Shield ====
31 January 1982

Sydney City	3–1	Brisbane Lions
Bennett 34' (o.g.); Kosmina 51', 72'	Report	Burns 75'

Richlands Stadium, Brisbane
Attendance: 1,000~
Referee: Dave Nugent
