= Israel national under-19 football team =

Israel Under-19/Under-20
- Association: Israel Football Association (IFA)
- Confederation: UEFA (Europe)
- Head coach: U19/U20: Ofir Haim
- Captain: U20: Ilay Madmon
- Most caps: U19: Maor Buzaglo (35); U20: Roy Nawi (7)
- Top scorer: U19: Maor Buzaglo (21); U20: Anan Khalaily (3)
- Home stadium: Netanya Stadium
- FIFA code: ISR
First colours	Second colours

First international
- U19: Romania 1–1 Israel (Herzliya, Israel; 10 March 2001); U20: Australia 0–0 Israel (Asunción, Paraguay; 9 February 1978)

Biggest win
- U19: Israel 9–0 Liechtenstein (Petah Tikva, Israel; 13 October 2013); U20: Israel 6–0 Papua New Guinea (Sydney, Australia; 17 February 1985)

Biggest defeat
- U19: Portugal 7–1 Israel (Ferreiras, Portugal; 28 May 2012); U20: Paraguay 3–0 Israel (Asunción, Paraguay; 11 February 1978)

AFC (Asia) Championship
- Appearances: 9 (first in 1964)
- Best result: Winners (1964, 1965, 1966, 1967, 1971, 1972)

OFC (Oceania) Championship
- Appearances: 2 (first in 1985)
- Best result: Runners-up (1985, 1986)

UEFA (Europe) Championship
- Appearances: 3 (first in 1997)
- Best result: Runners-up (2022)

FIFA World Youth Championship Intercontinental play-off
- Appearances: 4 (first in 1978)
- Best result: Runners-up (1982, 1990)

FIFA U-20 World Cup
- Appearances: 1 (first in 2023)
- Best result: Third place (bronze) (2023)
Medal record
Representing Israel U-19
UEFA European Under-19 Championship
Runner-up	2022 Slovakia	Team
Representing Israel U-20
FIFA U-20 World Cup
Bronze medal – third place	2023 Argentina	Team

In Israeli football (soccer), the Israel national under-19 football team (Hebrew: נבחרת (הנוער של) ישראל בכדורגל עד גיל 19) and the Israel national under-20 football team (נבחרת ישראל בכדורגל עד גיל 20); or simply Israel Under-19s, Israel U19s; Israel Under-20s, Israel U20s - both squads are also regarded as the feeders for the Israel national under-21 team.

This team is for Israeli players aged 19 (or under) at the start of a two-year UEFA European Under-19 Championship campaign) so players may be up to 20 years old, such as in the FIFA U-20 World Cup. In addition to the Israel's senior squad, there are also the Israeli squads for U-21 players, and other youth teams such as, the U-18, the U-17, and the U-16. Players are not level or nation static so can compete at any level as long as they are eligible; U19s do not relinquish level or nation association while competing and can compete on senior side, then back to U19s, and "youth level' or senior level with another nation.

As of 2021, the Israel U19 home ground is the Netanya Stadium in the city of Netanya, Israel.

== History ==
The idea to form a youth team first came about in 1957, as the IFA (Israel Football Association) considered entering a team to the 1958 UEFA European Under-18 Championship tournament. The youth team played its debut match against its England equivalent on 20 May 1962, losing 1–3. Two days later, the Israeli squad recorded its first victory, winning 2–1 in a rematch in England.

In 1964, the youth team participated for its debut time in the AFC Youth Championship tournament, sharing the cup with Burma in its first tournament in 1964. The team continued to win the title five more times in the next 8 years, before Israel was boycotted by Muslim and Arab countries along with North Korea, that voted against its participation in AFC tournaments during the 1970s.

Until 1992, the youth team's only official tournaments were FIFA Youth Championship qualification tournaments, twice participating in the process in the OFC U-20 Championship and once in the South American Youth Football Championship. At the same period of time, to give the youth squad its share of international matches, the IFA established an annual tournament for under-18 teams, which was held in December and January between 1974 and 1989 (after which the tournament became a tournament for under-17 teams).

In 1992, as Israel was admitted to UEFA, the squad began participating in the UEFA European Under-19 Championship (an under-18 tournament until 2002), appearing in the final tournament in 1997 and 2014 and in 2022.

Israel qualified for the 2023 FIFA U-20 World Cup by virtue of its performance at the 2022 UEFA European Under-19 Championship, finishing 2nd place after a loss to England in the final, 1–3 after extra time (1–1 at full time). Throughout the FIFA U-20 World Cup, Israel started against Colombia, which they lost 1–2. Then, they drew against Senegal 1–1. They came back from behind with 10-men to beat Japan 2–1, which secured Israel a spot in the knockout stage. Israel advanced out of the first knockout round with a 1–0 win against Uzbekistan. In the quarter-finals, they came from behind twice to defeat 5-time South American champions Brazil 3–2 in extra time. However, they lost to Uruguay in the semi-finals 0–1. Israel went on to defeat South Korea 3–1 to secure third place in their FIFA U-20 World Cup debut.

== Results and fixtures – Israel U-20 ==
Win Draw Loss

=== 2023 FIFA U-20 World Cup ===
==== Group stage ====
The top two teams of each group and the four best third-placed teams advanced to the round of 16.

All times are in Israel Summer Time (Israel Daylight Time, IDT), although the 2023 FIFA U-20 World Cup is entirely held at Argentina.

=== Group C ===
Pos	Team	Pld	W	D	L	GF	GA	GD	Pts	Qualification
1	Colombia	3	2	1	0	5	3	+2	7	Knockout stage
2	Israel	3	1	1	1	4	4	0	4	Knockout stage
3	Japan	3	1	0	2	3	4	−1	3	
4	Senegal	3	0	2	1	2	3	−1	2	

Source: FIFA
Rules for classification: Group stage tiebreakers

21 May 2023	Israel	1–2	Colombia	Estadio Único Diego Armando Maradona, La Plata, Argentina
21:00 (Israel Summer Time)	Turgeman 57' (pen.)	Report	Cortés 74' (pen.); Puerta 90'	Attendance: 7,613; Referee: Juan Gabriel Calderón (Costa Rica)

24 May 2023	Senegal	1–1	Israel	Estadio Único Diego Armando Maradona, La Plata, Argentina
21:00 (Israel Summer Time)	P. Diop 80'	Report	B. N'Diaye 58' (o.g.)	Attendance: 2,078; Referee: Yael Falcón Pérez (Argentina)

27 May 2023	Japan	1–2	Israel	Estadio Malvinas Argentinas, Mendoza, Argentina
00:00 (Israel Summer Time)	Sakamoto 45+1'	Report	Navi 76'; Senior 90+2'	Attendance: 7,581; Referee: Piero Maza (Chile)

The four best third-placed teams from the six groups advanced to the knockout stage along with the six group winners and six runners-up.

=== Knockout stage ===
==== Bracket ====
Round of 16
30 May – Mendoza
United States	4
New Zealand	0
1 June – Santiago del Estero
Gambia	0
Uruguay	1
30 May – Mendoza
Uzbekistan	0
Israel	1
31 May – La Plata
Brazil	4
Tunisia	1
31 May – San Juan
Colombia	5
Slovakia	1
31 May – La Plata
England	1
Italy	2
1 June – Santiago del Estero
Ecuador	2
South Korea	3
31 May – San Juan
Argentina	0
Nigeria	2

Quarter-finals
4 June – Santiago del Estero
United States	0
Uruguay	2
3 June – San Juan
Israel (a.e.t.)	3
Brazil	2
3 June – San Juan
Colombia	1
Italy	3
4 June – Santiago del Estero
South Korea	1
Nigeria	0

Semi-finals
8 June – La Plata
Uruguay	1
Israel	0
8 June – La Plata
Italy	2
South Korea	1

Final
11 June – La Plata
Uruguay	1
Italy	0
Third place play-off
11 June – La Plata
Israel	3
South Korea	1

=== Round of 16 (Eight-finals) ===
30 May 2023	Uzbekistan	0–1	Israel	Estadio Malvinas Argentinas, Mendoza, Argentina
00:00 (Israel Summer Time)		Report	Khalaily 90+7'	Attendance: 10,492; Referee: Yael Falcón Pérez (Argentina)

=== Quarter-finals ===
3 June 2023	Israel	3–2 (a.e.t.)	Brazil	Estadio San Juan del Bicentenario, San Juan, Argentina
20:30 (Israel Summer Time)	Khalaily 60'; Shibli 93'; Turgeman 105+3'	Report	Marcos Leonardo 56'; Matheus Nascimento 91'	Attendance: 1,765; Referee: Juan Gabriel Calderón (Costa Rica)

=== Semi-finals ===
8 June 2023	Uruguay	1–0	Israel	Estadio Único Diego Armando Maradona, La Plata, Argentina
20:30 (Israel Summer Time)	Duarte 61'	Report		Attendance: 27,860; Referee: José María Sánchez Martínez (Spain)

=== Third place play-off ===
11 June 2023	Israel	3–1	South Korea	Estadio Único Diego Armando Maradona, La Plata, Argentina
20:30 (Israel Summer Time)	Binyamin 19'; Senior 76'; Khalaily 85'	Report	Lee Seung-won 24' (pen.)	Attendance: Ramon Abatti (Brazil)

== International records ==
=== FIFA U-20 World Cup ===
FIFA U-20 World Cup
Year	Round	Position	GP	W	D	L	GF	GA
(Tunisia) 1977	did not qualify							
(Japan) 1979	did not qualify							
(Australia) 1981	did not qualify							
(Mexico) 1983	did not qualify							
(Soviet Union) 1985	did not qualify							
(Chile) 1987	did not qualify							
(Saudi Arabia) 1989	did not qualify							
(Portugal) 1991	did not qualify							
(Australia) 1993	did not qualify							
(Qatar) 1995	did not qualify							
(Malaysia) 1997	did not qualify							
(Nigeria) 1999	did not qualify							
(Argentina) 2001	did not qualify							
(United Arab Emirates) 2003	did not qualify							
(Netherlands) 2005	did not qualify							
(Canada) 2007	did not qualify							
(Egypt) 2009	did not qualify							
(Colombia) 2011	did not qualify							
(Turkey) 2013	did not qualify							
(New Zealand) 2015	did not qualify							
(South Korea) 2017	did not qualify							
(Poland) 2019	did not qualify							
(Indonesia) ~~2021~~	Cancelled due to the COVID-19 pandemic							
(Argentina) 2023	Third place	Third Place	7	4	1	2	11	8
(Chile) 2025	Did not qualify							
(Azerbaijan) (Uzbekistan) 2027	Did not qualify							
(Armenia) (Georgia (country)) 2029	To be determined							
Total	Third place	3rd	7	4	1	2	11	8

=== AFC U-19 Championship ===
Edition	Round	MP	W	D	L	GF	GA
(South Vietnam) 1964	Champions*	4	3	1	0	10	0
(Japan) 1965	Champions	6	6	0	0	32	4
(Philippines) 1966	Champions*	5	3	2	0	16	2
(Thailand) 1967	Champions	5	4	1	0	14	1
(South Korea) 1968	Third Place*	7	4	2	1	16	2
(Thailand) 1969	Fourth Place	6	4	0	2	8	3
(Philippines) 1970	Quarter-finals	4	2	1	1	10	1
(Japan) 1971	Champions	6	5	1	0	12	1
(Thailand) 1972	Champions	6	6	0	0	20	0
Total	9/9	49	37	8	4	138	14

- Champions* : Title shared
- DNP : Did Not Participate
- DNQ : Did not qualify

=== FIFA World Youth Championship Intercontinental play-off ===
Edition	Round	MP	W	D	L	GF	GA
(Paraguay) 1978	Group Phase	4	0	2	2	1	5
(Argentina) 1980	Group Phase	4	0	1	3	1	5
(Costa Rica) 1982	Runners-up	4	1	1	2	4	6
(Australia) 1990	Runners-up*	2	1	0	1	2	2

* Despite both matches of Israel against Australia being hosted in the same city of Sydney, Australia – Australia still won on away goals.

=== OFC U-20 Championship ===
Edition	Round	MP	W	D	L	GF	GA
(Australia) 1985	Runners-up	5	3	1	1	15	6
(New Zealand) 1986	Runners-up	4	2	2	0	11	3

=== South American Youth Football Championship ===
Edition	Round	MP	W	D	L	GF	GA
(Argentina) 1988	Group stage	5	3	0	2	6	4

=== UEFA European Under-18 Championship ===
Edition	Round	MP	W	D	L	GF	GA
(Germany) 1992	Qualifying round						
(England) 1993	First qualifying round						
(Spain) 1994	First qualifying round						
(Greece) 1995	First qualifying round						
(France) 1996	First qualifying round						
(Iceland) 1997	Group stage	3	0	1	2	1	6
(Cyprus) 1998	Second qualifying round						
(Sweden) 1999	First qualifying round						
(Germany) 2000	First qualifying round						
(Finland) 2001	Second qualifying round						

=== UEFA European Under-19 Championship ===
Edition	Round	MP	W	D	L	GF	GA	Squad
(Norway) 2002	First qualifying round							
(Liechtenstein) 2003	Second qualifying round							
(Switzerland) 2004	Second qualifying round							
(Northern Ireland) 2005	Elite round							
(Poland) 2006	Elite round							
(Austria) 2007	Elite round							
(Czech Republic) 2008	Elite round							
(Ukraine) 2009	First qualifying round							
(France) 2010	First qualifying round							
(Romania) 2011	Elite round							
(Estonia) 2012	Elite round							
(Lithuania) 2013	First qualifying round							
(Hungary) 2014	Group stage	3	0	0	3	1	8	Squad
(Greece) 2015	First qualifying round							
(Germany) 2016	Elite round							
(Georgia (country)) 2017	Elite round							
(Finland) 2018	First qualifying round							
(Armenia) 2019	Elite round							
(Northern Ireland) 2020	Cancelled due to the COVID-19 pandemic							
(Romania) 2021	Cancelled due to the COVID-19 pandemic							
(Slovakia) 2022	Runners-up	5	2	1	2	9	9	Squad
(Malta) 2023	Elite round							
(Northern Ireland) 2024	Elite round							
(Romania) 2025	Elite round							
(Wales) 2026	First qualifying round							
(Czech Republic) 2027	TBD							
Total	3/24	8	2	1	5	10	17	

== Results and fixtures – Israel U-19 ==
Win Draw Loss

=== 2022 UEFA European Under-19 Championship ===
==== Qualifiers ====
===== Qualifying Round – Group 4 =====
Pos	Team	Pld	W	D	L	GF	GA	GD	Pts	Qualification
1	Netherlands	3	3	0	0	13	1	+12	9	Elite round
2	Israel (H)	3	2	0	1	8	4	+4	6	Elite round
3	Cyprus	3	0	1	2	2	8	−6	1	
4	Moldova	3	0	1	2	2	12	−10	1	

Source: UEFA
Rules for classification: Tiebreakers
(H) Hosts

10 November 2021	Cyprus	0–1	Israel	Netanya Stadium, Netanya, Israel
18:00 (19:00 IST)		Report	Abed-Kassus 77'	Referee: Rauf Jabarov (Azerbaijan)

13 November 2021	Israel	6–0	Moldova	Netanya Stadium, Netanya, Israel
18:40 (19:40 IST)	Senior 6'; Turgeman 27'; Gloukh 75'; Abed-Kassus 81', 90+4'; Muche 89' (pen.)	Report		Referee: Luca Barbeno (San Marino)

16 November 2021	Israel	1–4	Netherlands	Netanya Stadium, Netanya, Israel
16:00 (17:00 IST)	Ibrahim Salman 36'	Report	Jimenez 11'; Emegha 45+3'; Simons 54' (pen.); De Jong 66'	Referee: Juri Frischer (Estonia)

===== Elite Round – Group 1 =====
Pos	Team	Pld	W	D	L	GF	GA	GD	Pts	Qualification
1	Israel	3	2	1	0	4	1	+3	7	Final tournament
2	Hungary (H)	3	1	1	1	4	2	+2	4	
3	Scotland	3	1	0	2	2	5	−3	3	
4	Turkey	3	1	0	2	4	6	−2	3	

Updated to match(es) played on 26 March 2022. Source: UEFA
Rules for classification: Qualification tiebreakers
(H) Hosts

23 March 2022	Israel	0–0	Hungary	ETO Park, Győr, Hungary
19:30		Report		Referee: Philip Farrugia (Malta)

26 March 2022	Turkey	1–3	Israel	ETO Park, Győr, Hungary
16:00	Elmaz 42' (pen.)	Report	Turgeman 32', 35'; Edri 66'	Referee: Mohammed Al-emara (Finland)

29 March 2022	Scotland	0–1	Israel	Ménfői úti Stadion, Győr, Hungary
17:45		Report	Revivo 88'	Referee: Christian-Petru Ciochirca (Austria)

==== Qualified teams for the final tournament ====
The following teams qualified for the final tournament of the 2022 UEFA European Under-19 Championship.

Note: All appearance statistics include only U-19 era (since 2002).

Team	Method of qualification	Appearance	Last appearance	Previous best performance
Slovakia	Hosts	2nd	2002	Third place (2002)
Romania	Elite round Group 4 winners	2nd	2011	Group Stage (2011)
Italy	Elite round Group 5 winners	8th	2019	Champions (2003)
Israel	Elite round Group 1 winners	2nd	2014	Group Stage (2014)
France	Elite round Group 2 winners	12th	2019	Champions (2005, 2010, 2016)
England	Elite round Group 3 winners	11th	2018	Champions (2017)
Austria	Elite round Group 7 winners	8th	2016	Semi-finals (2003, 2006, 2014)

=== Group stage ===
The final tournament schedule was announced on 28 April 2022.

The group winners and runners-up advanced to the semi-finals and qualify for the 2023 FIFA U-20 World Cup.

==== Group B ====
Pos	Team	Pld	W	D	L	GF	GA	GD	Pts	Qualification
1	England	3	3	0	0	7	0	+7	9	Knockout stage and 2023 FIFA U-20 World Cup
2	Israel	3	1	1	1	6	5	+1	4	Knockout stage and 2023 FIFA U-20 World Cup
3	Austria	3	1	0	2	5	8	−3	3	FIFA U-20 World Cup play-off
4	Serbia	3	0	1	2	4	9	−5	1	

Source: UEFA

19 June 2022	Serbia	2–2	Israel	Mestský štadión, Žiar nad Hronom, Slovakia
17:30	Lazetić 8'; Leković 90+3'	Report	Gloukh 16'; Ibrahim Salman 74'	Attendance: 945; Referee: António Nobre (Portugal)

22 June 2022	Israel	4–2	Austria	Mestský štadión, Žiar nad Hronom, Slovakia
17:30	Abed-Kassus 5'; Lugassy 29'; Madmon 52' (pen.); Gloukh 54'	Report	Jasic 24'; Demir 76'	Attendance: 1,026; Referee: Nathan Verboomen (Belgium)

25 June 2022	Israel	0–1	England	Mestský štadión, Žiar nad Hronom, Slovakia
20:00		Report	Delap 6'	Attendance: 933; Referee: Goga Kikacheishvili (Georgia)

=== Knockout stage ===
==== Bracket ====
Semi-finals
28 June – DAC Aréna
France	1
Israel	2
28 June – NTC Senec
England	2
Italy	1

Final
1 July – Anton Malatinský Stadium
Israel	1
England (a.e.t.)	3

=== FIFA U-20 World Cup play-off ===
Winners qualified for the 2023 FIFA U-20 World Cup.

==== Semi-finals ====
28 June 2022	France	1–2	Israel	DAC Aréna, Dunajská Streda, Slovakia
20:00	Virginius 62'	Report	Touré 29' (o.g.); Kancepolsky 57'	Attendance: 1,226; Referee: Morten Krogh (Denmark)

==== Final ====
1 July 2022	Israel	1–3 (a.e.t.)	England	Anton Malatinský Stadium, Trnava, Slovakia
20:00	Gloukh 40'	Report	Doyle 52'; Chukwuemeka 108'; Ramsey 116'	Referee: António Nobre (Portugal)

== Coaching staff – U-19 with U-20 ==
As of May 2023

Position	Name
Head coach	(Israel) Ofir Haim
Assistant managers	(Israel) Itay Mordechai
Assistant managers	(Israel) Eyal Gidron
Goalkeeping Coach	(Israel) Guy Solomon
Fitness Coaches	(Israel) Ofer Eckstein
Fitness Coaches	(Israel) Yehuda "Udi" Ben-Simhon (U-20 only)
Technical manager	(Israel) Asi Meir
Head doctor	(Israel) Miki Zager
Physiotherapist	(Israel) Ronen Grundman (U-20 only)
Physiotherapist/Masseur	(Israel) Igor Lomovsky
Masseur	(Israel) Nissan Refael Davidi

== Players ==
=== Current squad ===
The following players were called for the Qualification Round 2 of the 2027 UEFA European Under-19 Championship matches against Ukraine, Romania and Italy, on 11, 14 and 17 November 2026; respectively.

Caps and goals are correct as of 17 November 2026, after the match against Italy.

No.	Pos.	Player	Date of birth (age)	Caps	Goals	Club
	GK	Ilay Altman	1 May 2008 (age 18)	11	0	(Israel Football Association) Maccabi Petah Tikva
	GK	Mark Golenkov	2 July 2008 (age 18)	3	0	(Israel Football Association) Maccabi Haifa
	DF	Guy Elgalishvili	1 January 2008 (age 18)	13	0	(Israel Football Association) Hapoel Tel Aviv
	DF	Noam Levi	3 August 2008 (age 18)	9	1	(Israel Football Association) Maccabi Tel Aviv
	DF	Liroy Avrevaya	9 January 2008 (age 18)	8	1	(Israel Football Association) Maccabi Tel Aviv
	DF	Yazen Wated	1 January 2008 (age 18)	8	0	(Israel Football Association) Maccabi Petah Tikva
	DF	Liran Spiegel	27 April 2008 (age 18)	7	0	(Israel Football Association) Hapoel Kfar Shalem
	DF	Daniel Hadar	17 February 2008 (age 18)	5	0	(Israel Football Association) Maccabi Haifa
	DF	Eden Hayat	1 March 2008 (age 18)	4	0	(Israel Football Association) Maccabi Tel Aviv
	DF	Arad Gaist	21 April 2008 (age 18)	1	0	(Israel Football Association) Maccabi Haifa
	DF	Sahar Lavi	23 May 2009 (age 17)	1	0	(Israel Football Association) Maccabi Tel Aviv
	MF	Itamar Chosyd	26 August 2008 (age 18)	9	0	(Israel Football Association) Hapoel Tel Aviv
	MF	Noam Levy	13 November 2008 (age 18)	9	0	(Israel Football Association) Maccabi Haifa
	MF	Noam Cohen	26 August 2008 (age 18)	8	3	(Israel Football Association) Hapoel Petah Tikva
	MF	Yehonatan Segev	1 April 2008 (age 18)	6	1	(Israel Football Association) Maccabi Petah Tikva
	MF	Itay Mehager	4 February 2008 (age 18)	4	0	(Israel Football Association) Maccabi Tel Aviv
	MF	Eran Ginat	7 April 2008 (age 18)	4	0	(Israel Football Association) Maccabi Tel Aviv
	MF	Noam Goldenberg	22 January 2010 (age 16)	3	0	(Israel Football Association) Maccabi Haifa
	FW	Ilay Ben Simon	30 March 2009 (age 17)	15	5	(Israel Football Association) Maccabi Tel Aviv
	FW	Liam Luski	23 January 2009 (age 17)	9	2	(Israel Football Association) Maccabi Haifa
	FW	Adam Grimberg	7 September 2009 (age 17)	8	3	(Israel Football Association) Maccabi Haifa
	FW	Ido Yosef	1 August 2009 (age 17)	4	2	(Israel Football Association) Maccabi Tel Aviv
	FW	Dagim Avi	1 March 2009 (age 17)	3	0	(Israel Football Association) Hapoel Tel Aviv
	FW	Erez Didi	24 August 2009 (age 17)	3	0	(Israel Football Association) Maccabi Petah Tikva

=== Recent call-ups ===
The following players have also been called up to the Israel squad within the last twelve months.

Pos.	Player	Date of birth (age)	Caps	Goals	Club	Latest call-up
DF	Yonathan Shaul Kotseir	31 March 2008 (age 18)	4	0	(Israel) Maccabi Tel Aviv	v. Bosnia and Herzegovina, 31 March 2026
DF	Noam Shtaifman	1 February 2008 (age 18)	8	0	(Israel) Maccabi Haifa	v. Bosnia and Herzegovina, 31 March 2026
DF	Shlomo Dahan	1 February 2008 (age 18)	1	0	(Israel) Hapoel Be'er Sheva	v. Cyprus, 19 February 2026
MF	Yonatan Gilboa	1 July 2008 (age 18)	3	0	(Israel) Hapoel Be'er Sheva	v. Bosnia and Herzegovina, 31 March 2026
MF	Orian Goren	15 March 2009 (age 17)	8	0	(Spain) Barcelona	v. Bosnia and Herzegovina, 31 March 2026
MF	Liel Nagat	19 June 2008 (age 18)	1	0	(Israel) Maccabi Haifa	v. Cyprus, 19 February 2026
FW	Israel Dappa	31 January 2009 (age 17)	7	0	(Israel) Hapoel Jerusalem	v. Montenegro, 5 October 2026
FW	Omri Cohen	1 August 2008 (age 18)	5	0	(Israel) Hapoel Petah Tikva	v. Bosnia and Herzegovina, 31 March 2026
FW	Noam Alok	3 April 2008 (age 18)	2	0	(Israel) Maccabi Haifa	v. Bosnia and Herzegovina, 31 March 2026

== Head-to-head record ==
The following table shows Israel's head-to-head record in the FIFA U-20 World Cup and AFC U-20 Asian Cup.

=== In FIFA U-20 World Cup ===
Opponent	Pld	W	D	L	GF	GA	GD	Win %
Brazil	1	1	0	0	3	2	+1	100.00
Colombia	1	0	0	1	1	2	−1	0.00
Japan	1	1	0	0	2	1	+1	100.00
Senegal	1	0	1	0	1	1	+0	0.00
South Korea	1	1	0	0	3	1	+2	100.00
Uruguay	1	0	0	1	0	1	−1	0.00
Uzbekistan	1	1	0	0	1	0	+1	100.00
Total	7	4	1	2	11	8	+3	57.14

=== In AFC U-20 Asian Cup ===
Opponent	Pld	W	D	L	GF	GA	GD	Win %
Chinese Taipei	2	2	0	0	12	0	+12	100.00
Hong Kong	3	3	0	0	11	2	+9	100.00
India	4	3	1	0	14	1	+13	75.00
Indonesia	1	1	0	0	3	0	+3	100.00
Iran	2	1	0	1	2	2	+0	50.00
Japan	2	2	0	0	4	1	+3	100.00
Kuwait	1	1	0	0	2	0	+2	100.00
Laos	2	1	1	0	2	0	+2	50.00
Malaysia	5	4	0	1	20	1	+19	80.00
Myanmar	8	3	3	2	9	4	+5	37.50
Nepal	1	1	0	0	7	0	+7	100.00
Philippines	3	3	0	0	14	1	+13	100.00
Singapore	2	2	0	0	10	0	+10	100.00
South Korea	7	4	3	0	8	1	+7	57.14
Thailand	3	3	0	0	7	0	+7	100.00
Vietnam	3	3	0	0	13	1	+12	100.00
Total	49	37	8	4	138	14	+124	75.51

== Honours ==
- FIFA U-20 World Cup:
  - Third Place (1): 2023
- AFC U-19 Championship (Asia):
  - Winners (6): 1964, 1965, 1966, 1967, 1971, 1972
  - Third Place (1): 1968
  - Fourth Place (1): 1969
- OFC Championship (Oceania):
  - Runners-up (2): 1985, 1986
- UEFA European Under-19 Championship (Europe):
  - Runners-up (1): 2022

== See also ==
- FIFA U-20 World Cup
- UEFA European Under-19 Football Championship
- Israel national football team – senior men's squad
- Israel national under-23 football team – Olympic men's squad
- Israel national under-21 football team
- Israel national under-18 football team
- Israel national under-17 football team
- Israel national under-16 football team
