= Papua New Guinea national under-20 soccer team =

Papua New Guinea U20
- Nickname(s): Kapuls (Tok Pisin for Cuscus)
- Association: Papua New Guinea Football Association
- Confederation: OFC (Oceania)
- Head coach: Anthony Pakakota
- Captain: Ricky Wadunah
- Most caps: Mauri Wasi (10)
- Top scorer: Mauri Wasi (11)
First colours	Second colours

First international
- Australia 9–0 Papua New Guinea (Auckland, New Zealand; 11 November 1978)

Biggest win
- Western Samoa 0–5 Papua New Guinea (Suva, Fiji, 3 September 1988)

Biggest defeat
- New Zealand 11–0 Papua New Guinea (Sydney, Australia; 20 February 1985); New Zealand 12–1 Papua New Guinea (Auckland, New Zealand; 8 May 2014)

OFC U-20 Championship
- Appearances: 15
- Best result: Fourth Place (1978, 1982)

The Papua New Guinea national under-20 soccer team is the national U-20 team of Papua New Guinea and is controlled by the Papua New Guinea Football Association. PMRL Stadium, which has a capacity of 15,000, is used for home games.

== History ==
The Papua New Guinea national under-20 football team took part in the OFC U-20 Championship tournament 15 times (1978, 1980, 1982, 1985, 1988, 1992, 1994, 2001, 2002, 2011, 2013, 2014, 2016, 2018 and 2022) and their best results were in 1978 and 1982 when the team achieved fourth place both times.

== Competition record ==
=== OFC ===
The OFC Under 20 Qualifying Tournament is a tournament held once every two years to decide the two qualification spots for the Oceania Football Confederation (OFC) and its representatives at the FIFA U-20 World Cup.

OFC Under 20 Qualifying Tournament
Year	Round	Pld	W	D	L	GF	GA
(French Polynesia) 1974	Did not enter						
(New Zealand) 1978	Fourth place	3	0	0	3	0	17
(Fiji) 1980	Group stage	2	0	0	2	2	9
(Papua New Guinea) 1982	Fourth place	4	0	1	3	2	11
(Australia) 1985	Sixth Place	5	0	0	5	2	31
(New Zealand) 1986	Did not enter						
(Fiji) 1988	Group stage	3	1	1	1	6	2
(Fiji) 1990	Did not enter						
(French Polynesia) 1992	Group stage	4	0	0	4	3	11
(Fiji) 1994	Group stage	3	0	0	3	0	6
(New Zealand) 1997	Did not enter						
(Samoa) 1998	Did not enter						
(New Caledonia) (Cook Islands) 2001	Group stage	5	1	0	4	5	18
(Fiji) (Vanuatu) 2002	Group stage	2	0	1	1	2	8
(Solomon Islands) 2005	Did not enter						
(New Zealand) 2007	Did not enter						
(French Polynesia) 2008	Did not enter						
(New Zealand) 2011	Group stage	3	1	1	1	7	6
(Fiji) 2013	Fifth place	4	0	0	4	4	22
(Fiji) 2014	Fifth place	5	1	1	3	6	13
(Tonga) (Vanuatu) 2016	Group stage	3	0	1	2	3	8
(Cook Islands) (French Polynesia) 2018	Group stage	3	1	0	2	4	10
(French Polynesia) 2022	Quarter-finals	4	1	0	3	3	11
Total	15/23	53	6	6	41	49	183

=== FIFA U-20 World Cup ===
FIFA U-20 World Cup record
Year	Round	Pld	W	D	L	GF	GA
(Tunisia) 1977 to (Chile) 2025	Did not qualify						
Total	0/24	0	0	0	0	0	0

== Fixtures and results ==
3 September 2016 2016 OFC U-20 Championship	Papua New Guinea	1–4	New Caledonia	Port Vila, Vanuatu
12:00	Awi 34'	Report	Watrone 56'; Gope-Fenepej 68' (pen.); Poma 82'; Houala 90+4'	Stadium: Port Vila Municipal Stadium; Referee: (French Polynesia) Kader Zitouni (Tahiti)

6 September 2016 2016 OFC U-20 Championship	Vanuatu	3–1	Papua New Guinea	Port Vila, Vanuatu
15:00	Wilkins 50' (pen.); Kalo 56'; Thomas 81'	Report	Yanum 77'	Stadium: Port Vila Municipal Stadium; Referee: (New Zealand) Campbell-Kirk Waugh (New Zealand)

10 September 2016 2016 OFC U-20 Championship	Fiji	1–1	Papua New Guinea	Port Vila, Vanuatu
12:00	Catarogo 71'	Report	Dabinyaba 35'	Stadium: Port Vila Municipal Stadium; Referee: (Solomon Islands) Nelson Sogo (Solomon Islands)

== Current technical staff ==
Position	
Head coach	(Papua New Guinea) Anthony Pakakota
Assistant coach	(Papua New Guinea) Erickson Komeng
Team Manager	(Papua New Guinea) Joseph Ame

== Current squad ==
The following players were called up for the 2022 OFC U-19 Championship from 7 to 20 September 2022. Names in italics denote players who have been capped for the Senior team.

Caps and goals as of 1 September 2022 before the game against Fiji.

No.	Pos.	Player	Date of birth (age)	Caps	Goals	Club
1	GK	Jeezreel Apising	10 June 2004 (age 21)	0	0	
20	GK	Christian Jimmy	16 August 2003 (age 22)	0	0	
2	DF	Issac Basa	27 October 2003 (age 22)	0	0	
3	DF	Lee-Navu Faunt	4 May 2003 (age 22)	0	0	(Football Australia) Redlands United
5	DF	Kuman Gene	25 May 2004 (age 21)	0	0	
7	DF	Charles Hayes	18 June 2004 (age 21)	0	0	
10	DF	Nigel Kiaka	21 June 2004 (age 21)	0	0	
11	DF	Randell Kuapaitam	18 June 2003 (age 22)	0	0	
12	DF	Balthasar Mari	20 January 2003 (age 23)	0	0	
14	DF	Nick Naa'ru	29 April 2004 (age 21)	0	0	
17	DF	Felix Suaimbau	25 June 2003 (age 22)	0	0	
18	DF	Jarvin Sudii	28 August 2004 (age 21)	0	0	
19	DF	Alfred Tinge	23 November 2003 (age 22)	0	0	(Papua New Guinea Football Association) Northern Youth
21	DF	Maroa Tom	3 March 2003 (age 23)	0	0	
24	DF	Claus Wall	8 July 2004 (age 21)	0	0	
4	MF	Michael Gambu	13 March 2003 (age 23)	0	0	(Papua New Guinea Football Association) Northern Youth
6	MF	Jese Grese	16 September 2003 (age 22)	0	0	
22	MF	Joshua Urro	16 April 2003 (age 22)	0	0	
23	MF	Jason Wadunah	25 January 2003 (age 23)	0	0	(Papua New Guinea Football Association) Tusbab Stallions
26	MF	Hamray Wayne	25 July 2004 (age 21)	0	0	
8	FW	Cyril Kadiko	29 August 2004 (age 21)	0	0	
9	FW	Jeremiah Kamake	31 July 2003 (age 22)	0	0	
13	FW	Jahnnel Meio	10 December 2004 (age 21)	0	0	
15	FW	Rex Naime	23 October 2003 (age 22)	0	0	(Papua New Guinea Football Association) Hekari United
16	FW	Vianney Noneng	15 January 2004 (age 22)	0	0	
25	FW	Jezshril Warren	6 March 2004 (age 22)	0	0	

== 2018 squad ==
The following players have been called up for the 2018 OFC U-19 Championship from 5 to 18 August 2018. Names in italics denote players who have been capped for the Senior team.

Caps and goals as of 12 August 2018 after the game against New Zealand.

No.	Pos.	Player	Date of birth (age)	Caps	Goals	Club
1	GK	Baxter Morris	24 December 1999 (age 26)	0	0	(Papua New Guinea Football Association) Besta United PNG
20	GK	Graham Berigami	1 February 2000 (age 26)	3	0	(Papua New Guinea Football Association) Besta United PNG
2	DF	Laventine Munuo	5 April 1999 (age 26)	1	0	(Papua New Guinea Football Association) Southern Strikers
3	DF	Kimson Kapai	18 August 2000 (age 25)	2	0	(Papua New Guinea Football Association) Besta United PNG
4	DF	Sylvester Luke	12 December 2000 (age 25)	3	0	(Papua New Guinea Football Association) Besta United PNG
5	DF	Freeman Giwi	7 July 2000 (age 25)	2	0	(Papua New Guinea Football Association) Tusbab Stallions
15	DF	Dinniget Luaine	16 May 2000 (age 25)	1	0	(Papua New Guinea Football Association) Besta United PNG
17	DF	Dopson Noi	7 November 2000 (age 25)	2	0	(Papua New Guinea Football Association) Besta United PNG
6	MF	Ricky Wadunah	20 December 2000 (age 25)	3	0	(Papua New Guinea Football Association) Tusbab Stallions
7	MF	Emmanuel Simongi	25 September 2000 (age 25)	3	0	(Papua New Guinea Football Association) Toti City
8	MF	Stahl Gubag	17 July 1999 (age 26)	6	0	(Papua New Guinea Football Association) Tusbab Stallions
9	MF	Barthy Kerobin	13 September 2000 (age 25)	3	1	(Papua New Guinea Football Association) Besta United PNG
10	MF	Oberth Simon	1 January 2001 (age 25)	3	0	(Papua New Guinea Football Association) Besta United PNG
11	MF	Yagi Yasasa	17 August 2000 (age 25)	2	0	(Papua New Guinea Football Association) Besta United PNG
19	MF	Abraham Allen	25 December 2000 (age 25)	3	2	(Papua New Guinea Football Association) Besta United PNG
13	FW	Cameron Nuabi	20 August 2000 (age 25)	2	0	(Papua New Guinea Football Association) Southern Strikers
16	FW	Jonathan Allen	3 January 2000 (age 26)	2	1	(Papua New Guinea Football Association) Besta United PNG
18	FW	Wolfram Gregory	25 March 2000 (age 26)	2	0	(Papua New Guinea Football Association) Besta United PNG
