= Peter Ravai =

Fijian footballer

Personal information
- Full name: Peter Charles Tamani Ravai Ravitisai
- Date of birth: 25 March 2003 (age 23)
- Place of birth: Edinburgh, Scotland
- Height: 1.86 m (6 ft 1 in)
- Positions: Defender; midfielder

Team information
- Current team: Kingborough Lions United FC

Youth career
- 2010–2011: Eintracht Bad Fallingbostel
- 2011–2012: HSV
- 2013–2016: Park Farm Rangers
- 2016–2019: Ashford United
- 2019–2020: Soccer Elite FA
- 2020–2022: Maidstone United

Senior career*
Years	Team	Apps	(Gls)
2022–	Rewa		

International career
2022	Fiji U19	5	(0)
2023–	Fiji U20	3	(0)
Medal record
Men's football
Representing Fiji
OFC U-19 Championship
Runner-up	2022 Tahiti
- * Club domestic league appearances and goals

Peter Charles Tamani Ravai Ravitisai (born 25 March 2003), known as Peter Ravai, is a professional footballer who plays as a defender and midfielder for Kingborough Lions United FC in Tasmania, Australia. Born in Scotland, he represents Fiji at youth level.

== Early life ==
Ravai was born in Edinburgh, Scotland, to Fijian parents. His father was in the British Army, and he moved to Germany at a young age.

== Club career ==
=== Early career ===
At the age of seven, Ravai joined amateur side Eintracht Bad Fallingbostel, where he spent a season before being scouted by professional side Hamburger SV. His family moved to England, and he played for the academies of Park Farm Rangers and Ashford United and spent a year with the Soccer Elite Football Academy, before joining Maidstone United in 2020.

=== Kingborough Lions United FC ===
In the 2026 Milan Lakoseljac Cup, Ravai came on a substitute and scored the winning penalty in a shootout.

== International career ==
Ravai is eligible to represent Scotland having been born there and Fiji through his parents.

== Honours ==
Fiji U20

- OFC U-19 Championship: Runner-up, 2019
