= Chinese Taipei national under-20 football team =

Chinese Taipei U-20
- Association: Chinese Taipei Football Association
- Confederation: AFC (Asia)
- Sub-confederation: EAFF (East Asia)
- FIFA code: TPE

First international
- Taiwan 1–4 Thailand (Bangkok, Thailand; 12 April 1961)

Biggest win
- Northern Mariana Islands 0–18 Chinese Taipei (Dededo, Guam; 11 August 2013)

Biggest defeat
- Japan 12–0 Chinese Taipei (Shizuoka, Japan; 15 May 1994)

AFC U-20 Asian Cup
- Appearances: 9 (first in 1961)
- Best result: Third place in 1966

OFC U-19 Men's Championship
- Appearances: 3 (first in 1985)
- Best result: Third place in 1988

The Chinese Taipei national under-20 football team represents Taiwan in youth level international football competitions and is controlled by Chinese Taipei Football Association.

== Competitive record ==
=== AFC U-20 Asian Cup ===
AFC U-20 Asian Cup record									Qualification record					
Year	Round	Pos	Pld	W	D	L	GF	GA	Pld	W	D	L	GF	GA
(Malaysia) 1959	Did not enter								No qualifications					
(Malaysia) 1960	Did not enter								No qualifications					
(Thailand) 1961	Group stage		4	0	0	4	4	20	No qualifications					
(Thailand) 1962	Did not enter								No qualifications					
(Malaysia) 1963	Did not enter								No qualifications					
(South Vietnam) 1964	Did not enter								No qualifications					
(Japan) 1965	Did not enter								No qualifications					
(Philippines) 1966	Third Place	3rd	7	2	3	2	6	13	No qualifications					
(Thailand) 1967	Group stage		3	1	0	2	4	7	No qualifications					
(South Korea) 1968	Group stage		3	0	0	3	1	14	No qualifications					
(Thailand) 1969	Group stage		3	0	2	1	6	7	No qualifications					
(Philippines) 1970	Group stage		3	0	0	3	0	5	No qualifications					
(Japan) 1971	Group stage		3	1	0	2	3	6	No qualifications					
(Thailand) 1972	Group stage		3	0	1	2	1	7	No qualifications					
(Iran) 1973	Did not enter								No qualifications					
(Thailand) 1974	Group stage		3	1	0	2	3	4	No qualifications					
(Kuwait) 1975	Did not enter								No qualifications					
(Thailand) 1976	OFC member								OFC member					
(Iran) 1977	OFC member								OFC member					
(Bangladesh) 1978	OFC member								OFC member					
(Thailand) 1980	OFC member								OFC member					
(Thailand) 1982	OFC member								OFC member					
(United Arab Emirates) 1985	OFC member								OFC member					
(Saudi Arabia) 1986	OFC member								OFC member					
(Qatar) 1988	OFC member								OFC member					
(Indonesia) 1990	Did not qualify								2	0	0	2	1	8
(United Arab Emirates) 1992	Did not qualify								7	3	3	1	11	3
(Indonesia) 1994	Did not qualify								2	1	0	1	7	12
(South Korea) 1996	Did not qualify								3	0	1	2	1	7
(Thailand) 1998	Did not qualify								Unknown					
(Iran) 2000	Did not qualify								3	1	0	2	4	7
(Qatar) 2002	Did not qualify								3	2	0	1	13	6
(Malaysia) 2004	Did not qualify								2	1	0	1	3	7
(India) 2006	Did not qualify								2	0	0	2	0	10
(Saudi Arabia) 2008	Did not qualify								5	0	2	3	5	11
(China) 2010	Did not qualify								5	0	0	5	3	20
(United Arab Emirates) 2012	Did not qualify								4	1	0	3	11	12
(Myanmar) 2014	Did not qualify								3	0	0	3	1	10
(Bahrain) 2016	Did not qualify								4	1	1	2	13	12
(Indonesia) 2018	Group stage		3	0	0	3	2	15	3	2	0	1	5	2
(Uzbekistan) 2020	Cancelled								3	1	0	2	9	7
(Uzbekistan) 2023	Did not qualify								4	2	1	1	10	1
(China) 2025	Did not qualify								4	0	1	3	3	8
(China) 2027	Did not qualify								Did not qualify					
(China) 2029	To be determined								To be determined					
Total	Third place		35	5	6	24	30	98	59	15	9	35	100	143

=== OFC U-19 Championship ===
OFC U-19 Championship record
Year	Round	Pos	Pld	W	D*	L	GF	GA
(French Polynesia) 1974	AFC member							
(New Zealand) 1978	Did not enter							
(Fiji) 1980	Did not enter							
(Papua New Guinea) 1982	Did not enter							
(Australia) 1985	Fourth place	4th	5	2	0	3	7	12
(New Zealand) 1986	Fourth place	4th	4	0	2	2	4	13
(Fiji) 1988	Third Place	3rd	3	2	0	2	7	10
Total	Third Place	3/7	12	4	2	7	18	25

== Current squad ==
=== 2018 AFC U-19 Championship Qualification ===
Team Squad for 2018 AFC U-19 Championship qualification

As of 10 November 2017

No.	Pos.	Player	Date of birth (age)	Caps	Goals	Club
1	GK	Li Guan-pei	May 7, 2000 (age 26)	0	0	(Chinese Taipei Football Association) Taichung Municipal HuiWen High School
18	GK	Meng Fan-yu		0	0	(Chinese Taipei Football Association) Taichung Municipal HuiWen High School
22	GK	Hung Shih-cheng		0	0	(Chinese Taipei Football Association) National Pei Men Senior High School
2	DF	Hou Pin-i	May 6, 1999 (age 27)	0	0	(Chinese Taipei Football Association) Kaohsiung Medical University, KMU
3	DF	Wang Yi-you	November 29, 1999 (age 26)	0	0	(Chinese Taipei Football Association) Taichung Municipal HuiWen High School
4	DF	Fong Shao-chi	February 15, 2000 (age 26)	0	0	(Chinese Taipei Football Association) National Hualien Agricultural High School
5	DF	Huang Hsiang-che	May 2, 1999 (age 27)	0	0	(Japan Football Association) Toko Gakuen High School
6	DF	Chin Wen-yeh	May 30, 2000 (age 26)	0	0	(Chinese Taipei Football Association) Taichung Municipal HuiWen High School
16	DF	Wu Meng-chi		0	0	(Chinese Taipei Football Association) Taichung Municipal HuiWen High School
21	DF	Huang Tzu-ming		0	0	(Chinese Taipei Football Association) National Hualien Agricultural High School
7	MF	Lan Hao-yu	January 13, 1999 (age 27)	0	0	(Chinese Taipei Football Association) Ming Chuan University, MCU
8	MF	Wu Yen-shu	October 21, 1999 (age 26)	0	0	(Chinese Taipei Football Association) National Hualien Senior High School
10	MF	Tu Shao-chieh (captain)	January 2, 1999 (age 27)	0	0	(Chinese Taipei Football Association) Ming Chuan University, MCU
12	MF	Wang Sheng-han	March 9, 1999 (age 27)	0	0	(Chinese Taipei Football Association) Ming Chuan University, MCU
13	MF	Chiu Po-jui	August 3, 1999 (age 27)	0	0	(Chinese Taipei Football Association) Ming Chuan University, MCU
17	MF	Adrian Richard Harkness		0	0	(United States Soccer Federation) Manhattan Soccer Club
19	MF	Tsai Cheng-uu		0	0	(Chinese Taipei Football Association) National Pei Men Senior High School
9	FW	Huang Jyun-wun		0	0	(Chinese Taipei Football Association) University of Taipei, UT
11	FW	Wang Chung-yu	May 29, 1999 (age 27)	0	0	(Chinese Taipei Football Association) Ming Chuan University, MCU
14	FW	Lin Wei-chieh	October 9, 1999 (age 26)	0	0	(Chinese Taipei Football Association) New Taipei Municipal Qing Shui High School
15	FW	Lin Ming-wei	May 20, 2001 (age 25)	0	0	(Chinese Taipei Football Association) New Taipei Municipal Qing Shui High School
20	FW	Chang Chih-chieh		0	0	(Chinese Taipei Football Association) National Hualien Agricultural High School
23	FW	Hsu Chia-yu		0	0	(Chinese Taipei Football Association) Taichung Municipal HuiWen High School

=== AFC U-19 Championship Indonesia 2018 ===
Team Squad for 2018 AFC U-19 Championship

As of 17 October 2018

No.	Pos.	Player	Date of birth (age)	Caps	Goals	Club
1	GK	LI, GUAN-PEI	May 7, 2000 (age 26)	0	0	(Chinese Taipei Football Association) University of Taipei, UT
18	GK	LEE, BING-HAN	April 6, 2000 (age 26)	0	0	(Chinese Taipei Football Association) National Taiwan University of Sport, NTUS
22	GK	LAI, PO-LUN	June 25, 1999 (age 27)	0	0	(Chinese Taipei Football Association) Fu Jen Catholic University, FJU
2	DF	HOU, PIN-I	May 6, 1999 (age 27)	0	0	(Chinese Taipei Football Association) Kaohsiung Medical University, KMU
3	DF	WANG, YI-YOU	November 29, 1999 (age 26)	0	0	(Chinese Taipei Football Association) University of Taipei, UT
4	DF	FONG, SHAO-CHI	February 15, 2000 (age 26)	0	0	(Chinese Taipei Football Association) University of Taipei, UT
5	DF	HUANG, HSIANG-CHE	May 2, 1999 (age 27)	0	0	(Chinese Taipei Football Association) Tatung F.C.
6	DF	CHIN, WEN-YEN	May 30, 2000 (age 26)	0	0	(Chinese Taipei Football Association) University of Taipei, UT
14	DF	LIN, WEI-CHIEH	October 9, 1999 (age 26)	0	0	(Chinese Taipei Football Association) New Taipei Municipal Qing Shui High School
16	DF	KARL HU-JOSEFSSON	May 11, 2001 (age 25)	0	0	(Swedish Football Association) Djurgårdens IF Fotbollsförening U17
21	DF	HUANG, TZU-MING	November 18, 2000 (age 25)	0	0	(Chinese Taipei Football Association) National Hualien Agricultural High School
7	MF	LAN, HAO-YU	January 13, 1999 (age 27)	0	0	(Chinese Taipei Football Association) Ming Chuan University, MCU
8	MF	WU, YEN-SHU	October 21, 1999 (age 26)	0	0	(Chinese Taipei Football Association) National Hualien Senior High School, HLHS
9	MF	HUANG, JYUN-WUN	March 8, 1999 (age 27)	0	0	(Chinese Taipei Football Association) University of Taipei, UT
10	MF	Will Donkin	December 26, 2000 (age 25)	0	0	(The Football Association) Crystal Palace F.C. U18
12	MF	WANG, SHENG-HAN	March 9, 1999 (age 27)	0	0	(Chinese Taipei Football Association) Ming Chuan University, MCU
13	MF	CHIU, PO-JUI	August 3, 1999 (age 27)	0	0	(Chinese Taipei Football Association) Ming Chuan University, MCU
17	MF	MIGUEL SANDBERG	August 5, 2002 (age 24)	0	0	(Swedish Football Association) Djurgårdens IF Fotbollsförening U17
19	MF	TU, SHAO-CHIEH (captain)	January 2, 1999 (age 27)	0	0	(Chinese Taipei Football Association) Ming Chuan University, MCU
23	MF	HUANG, SHENG-CHIEH	February 22, 1999 (age 27)	0	0	(Chinese Taipei Football Association) Ming Chuan University, MCU
11	FW	WANG, CHUNG-YU	May 29, 1999 (age 27)	0	0	(Chinese Taipei Football Association) Ming Chuan University, MCU
15	FW	LIN, MING-WEI	May 20, 2001 (age 25)	0	0	(Chinese Taipei Football Association) New Taipei Municipal Qing Shui High School
20	FW	CHEN, PO-YU	February 29, 2000 (age 26)	0	0	(Chinese Taipei Football Association) National Taiwan University of Sport, NTUS

== See also ==
- Chinese Taipei national football team
- Chinese Taipei national under-23 football team
