= Guy Solomon =

Israeli former association footballer

Guy Solomon גיא סולומון
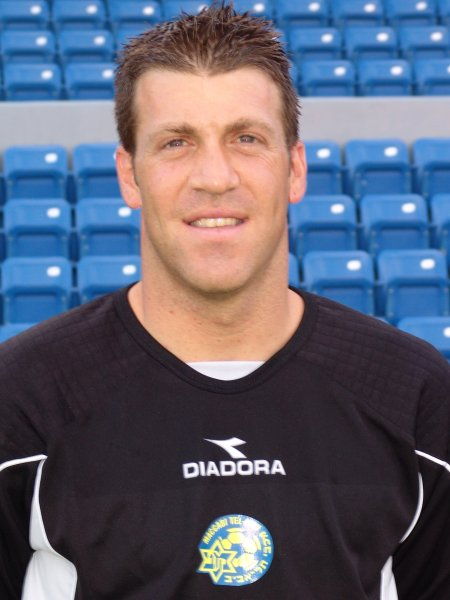

Personal information
- Full name: Guy Solomon
- Date of birth: 23 September 1977 (age 49)
- Place of birth: Ramat HaSharon, Israel
- Height: 1.89 m (6 ft 2 1/2 in)
- Position: Goalkeeper

Team information
- Current team: Beitar Jerusalem (Goalkeeping Coach)

Youth career
- Maccabi Tel Aviv
- 1996–1998: Maccabi Herzliya

Senior career*
Years	Team	Apps	(Gls)
1998–2002	Maccabi Herzliya	8	(0)
2002–2004	Maccabi Netanya	14	(0)
2004–2006	Beitar Jerusalem	8	(0)
2006–2012	Maccabi Tel Aviv	6	(0)
2012–2013	Hapoel Ramat Gan	1	(0)
2013–2014	Hapoel Ra'anana	0	(0)
Total		37	(0)

Managerial career
- 2013–2014: Hapoel Ra'anana (Goalkeeping Coach)
- 2014–: Beitar Jerusalem (Goalkeeping Coach)
- * Club domestic league appearances and goals

Guy Solomon (Hebrew: גיא סולומון; born 23 September 1977) is an Israeli former goalkeeper who is the goalkeeping coach of the Israel national under-19 football team.

He started his pro career in 1998 at Maccabi Herzliya after he left his youth club Maccabi Tel Aviv. He also played for Maccabi Netanya and Beitar Jerusalem before returning to his home club. For most of his career he played as a back-up and rarely got a chance as first option.

== Honours ==
- Israeli Toto Cup:
  - 2008-09

== See also ==
- List of Jewish footballers
- List of Jews in sports
- List of Jews in sports (non-players)
- List of Israelis
