= Joji Vuakaca =

Fijian footballer

Personal information
- Date of birth: 24 March 2003 (age 23)
- Place of birth: Labasa, Fiji
- Height: 1.85 m (6 ft 1 in)
- Position: Goalkeeper

Team information
- Current team: Bula
- Number: 22

Youth career
- Northpole Lions
- –2021: Labasa

Senior career*
Years	Team	Apps	(Gls)
2021–2026	Labasa	17	(0)
2026	Bula	0	(0)
2026–	Labasa	0	(0)

International career^{‡}
2022–2023	Fiji U20	2	(0)
2024–	Fiji	0	(0)
- * Club domestic league appearances and goals as of 27 May 2026 ‡ National team caps and goals as of 27 May 2026

Joji Vuakaca (born 24 March 2003) is a Fijian professional footballer who plays as a goalkeeper for Fiji Premier League club Labasa and the Fiji national football team.

== Club career ==
=== Labasa ===
Vuakaca began his career at Labasa F.C., joining the senior team in 2021. He made 17 appearances for the club, including a 3–2 victory over Navua, in which he was sent off.

=== Bula ===
Vuakaca signed with Bula FC, a newly created club based in Suva, for the inaugural season of the OFC Professional League.

== International career ==
Vuakaca made his Fiji U20 debut in a 0–0 draw against Tahiti in the 2022 OFC U-19 Championship, a tournament in which Fiji were runners-up. Vuakaca was part of the Fiji U20 squad for the 2023 FIFA U-20 World Cup.

Vuakaca earned his first call-up to the senior Fiji team in 2024, but did not make an appearance.
