= OFC U-19 Men's Championship =

OFC U-19 Championship
- Organiser(s): OFC
- Founded: 1974
- Region: Oceania
- Teams: 11
- Current champions: New Zealand (10th title)
- Most championships: Australia (12 titles)
- Website: http://www.oceaniafootball.com
- 2026 OFC U-19 Championship

The OFC U-19 Championship is a tournament held once every two years to decide the under-19 champions of Oceania and also decides who will represent Oceania Football Confederation (OFC) at the biennial FIFA U-20 World Cup.

Between 1974 and 2012, the competition was open to teams under 20 years of age and called the OFC U-20 Championship. Since 2014, the age limit was darkreduced to under 19 years of age, and since 2018, the tournament name was changed to the OFC U-19 Championship.

== Eligible teams ==
Fourteen nations are eligible to participate in the tournament, these are:

- American Samoa
- Cook Islands
- Fiji
- Kiribati (not a member of FIFA)
- New Caledonia
- New Zealand
- Niue (not a member of FIFA)
- Papua New Guinea
- Samoa
- Solomon Islands
- Tahiti (French Polynesia)
- Tonga
- Tuvalu (not a member of FIFA)
- Vanuatu

=== Former teams ===
- Israel (now is UEFA member)
- Chinese Taipei (now is AFC member)
- Australia (now is AFC member)

== Results ==
=== Summaries ===
Ed.	Year	Hosts	Winners	Score	Runners-up	Third place	Score	Fourth place
1	1974	Tahiti	Tahiti	2–0	New Zealand	New Hebrides	– (Note: Group stage, defined on points earned.)	New Caledonia
2	1978	New Zealand	Australia	–	Fiji	New Zealand	–	Papua New Guinea
3	1980	Fiji	New Zealand	2–0	Australia	Fiji	4–3	New Caledonia
4	1982	Papua New Guinea	Australia	4–3 (a.e.t.)	New Zealand	Fiji	2–1	Papua New Guinea
5	1985	Australia	Australia	–	Israel	New Zealand	–	Chinese Taipei
6	1986	New Zealand	Australia	–	Israel	New Zealand	–	Chinese Taipei
7	1988	Fiji	Australia	1–0	New Zealand	Chinese Taipei	2–0	Fiji
8	1990	Fiji	Australia	–	New Zealand	Vanuatu	–	Tahiti
9	1992	Tahiti	New Zealand	–	Tahiti	Fiji	–	Vanuatu
10	1994	Fiji	Australia	1–0	New Zealand	Solomon Islands	0–0 (4–2 p)	Vanuatu
11	1997	Tahiti	Australia	2–1	New Zealand	Fiji	1–1 (5–4 p)	Tahiti
12	1998	Samoa	Australia	2–0	Fiji	New Zealand	2–1	Solomon Islands
13	2001	Cook Islands, New Caledonia	Australia	4–3 (Note: Aggregate score. (1–2 in first leg; 3–1 (a.e.t.) in second leg))	New Zealand	– (Note: There was no dispute for third place.)		
14	2002	Fiji, Vanuatu	Australia	15–0 (Note: Aggregate score. (11–0 in first leg; 4–0 in second leg))	Fiji	–		
15	2005	Solomon Islands	Australia	3–0	Solomon Islands	Vanuatu	4–1	Fiji
16	2007	New Zealand	New Zealand	–	Fiji	Solomon Islands	–	New Caledonia
17	2008	Tahiti	Tahiti	–	New Caledonia	New Zealand	–	Fiji
18	2011	New Zealand	New Zealand	3–1	Solomon Islands	Vanuatu	2–0	Fiji
19	2013	Fiji	New Zealand	–	Fiji	Vanuatu	–	New Caledonia
20	2014	Fiji	Fiji	–	Vanuatu	New Caledonia	–	Solomon Islands
21	2016	Vanuatu	New Zealand	5–0	Vanuatu	New Caledonia and Solomon Islands		
22	2018	Tahiti	New Zealand	1–0	Tahiti	New Caledonia	4–1	Solomon Islands
23	2022	Tahiti	New Zealand	3–0	Fiji	New Caledonia	1–1 (5–4 p)	Tahiti
24	2024	Samoa	New Zealand	4–0	New Caledonia	Solomon Islands	4–2	Fiji
25	2026	Samoa	New Zealand	2–0	Tahiti	Solomon Islands	1–0	New Caledonia

=== Performances by team ===
Team	Champions	Runners-up	Third-place	Fourth-place
Australia	12 (1978, 1982, 1985*, 1986, 1988, 1990, 1994, 1997, 1998, 2001, 2002, 2005)	1 (1980)	–	–
New Zealand	10 (1980, 1992, 2007*, 2011*, 2013, 2016, 2018, 2022, 2024, 2026)	7 (1974, 1982, 1988, 1990, 1994, 1997, 2001)	5 (1978*, 1985, 1986*, 1998, 2008)	–
Tahiti	2 (1974*, 2008*)	3 (1992*, 2018*, 2026)	–	3 (1990, 1997*, 2022*)
Fiji	1 (2014*)	6 (1978, 1998, 2002*, 2007, 2013*, 2022)	4 (1980*, 1982, 1992, 1997)	5 (1988*, 2005, 2008, 2011, 2024)
Vanuatu	–	2 (2014, 2016*)	5 (1974, (Note: This 1974 third place was achieved by Vanuatu under its former name New Hebrides.) 1990, 2002*, 2007, 2013)	2 (1992, 1994)
Solomon Islands	–	2 (2005*, 2011)	4 (1994, 2007, 2024, 2026)	3 (1998, 2014, 2018)
New Caledonia	–	2 (2008, 2024)	3 (2014, 2018, 2022)	5 (1974, 1980, 2007, 2013, 2026)
Israel	–	2 (1985, 1986)	–	–
Chinese Taipei	–	–	1 (1988)	2 (1985, 1986)
Papua New Guinea	–	–	–	2 (1978, 1982*)

* = As hosts

== Participating nations ==
Legend

- 1st – Champions
- 2nd – Runners-up
- 3rd – Third place
- 4th – Fourth place
- SF – Semi-finals
- 5th–7th – Fifth to Seventh place
- QF – Quarter-finals
- GS – Group stage
- PR – Preliminary round
- q – Qualified
- — Hosts
- •• – Qualified but withdrew
- × – Did not enter
- • – Did not qualify
- × – Withdrew / Banned / Entry not accepted by FIFA
- — Country not affiliated to OFC at that time
- — Country did not exist or national team was inactive
- – Not affiliated to FIFA

Team	(French Polynesia) 1974	(New Zealand) 1978	(Fiji) 1980	(Papua New Guinea) 1982	(Australia) 1985	(New Zealand) 1986	(Fiji) 1988	(Fiji) 1990	(French Polynesia) 1992	(Fiji) 1994	(French Polynesia) 1997	(Samoa) 1998	(New Caledonia) (Cook Islands) 2001	(Vanuatu) (Fiji) 2002	(Solomon Islands) 2005	(New Zealand) 2007	(French Polynesia) 2008	(New Zealand) 2011	(Fiji) 2013	(Fiji) 2014	(Tonga) (Vanuatu) 2016	(Cook Islands) (French Polynesia) 2018	(French Polynesia) 2022	(Vanuatu) (Samoa) 2024	(Cook Islands) (Samoa) 2026	Years
American Samoa	×	×	×	×	×	×	×	×	×	×	×	GS	×	×	×	×	×	GS	×	6th	PR	PR	GS	PR	×	7
Australia	×	1st	2nd	1st	1st	1st	1st	1st	×	1st	1st	1st	1st	1st	1st	Part of AFC										13
Chinese Taipei	×	×	×	×	4th	4th	3rd	Part of AFC																		3
Cook Islands	×	×	×	×	×	×	×	×	×	×	×	×	GS	×	×	×	×	×	×	×	GS	PR	GS	PR	PR	5
Fiji	×	2nd	3rd	3rd	5th	5th	4th	5th	3rd	GS	3rd	2nd	GS	2nd	4th	2nd	4th	4th	2nd	1st	GS	GS	2nd	4th	GS	25
Israel	×	×	×	×	2nd	2nd	×	×	Part of UEFA																	2
New Caledonia	4th	×	4th	×	×	×	×	×	×	×	×	×	GS	GS	GS	4th	2nd	GS	4th	3rd	SF	3rd	3rd	2nd	4th	16
New Zealand	2nd	3rd	1st	2nd	3rd	3rd	2nd	2nd	1st	2nd	2nd	3rd	2nd	GS	GS	1st	3rd	1st	1st	×	1st	1st	1st	1st	1st	25
Papua New Guinea	×	4th	6th	4th	6th	×	GS	×	5th	GS	×	×	GS	GS	×	×	×	GS	5th	5th	GS	GS	QF	GS	GS	17
Samoa	×	×	×	×	×	×	GS	×	×	GS	×	GS	GS	GS	GS	7th	×	×	×	×	PR	PR	QF	GS	GS	13
Solomon Islands	×	×	×	×	×	×	×	×	×	3rd	×	4th	GS	×	2nd	3rd	×	2nd	×	4th	SF	4th	QF	3rd	3rd	13
Tahiti	1st	×	5th	×	×	×	×	4th	2nd	GS	4th	×	GS	×	×	5th	1st	×	×	×	GS	2nd	4th	GS	2nd	15
Tonga	×	×	×	×	×	×	×	×	×	×	×	GS	GS	GS	GS	×	×	×	×	×	PR	GS	GS	PR	PR	8
Vanuatu	3rd	×	×	×	×	×	GS	3rd	4th	4th	×	GS	GS	GS	3rd	6th	×	3rd	3rd	2nd	2nd	GS	QF	GS	GS	19

== FIFA U-20 World Cup performances ==
Legend

- 1st – Champions
- 2nd – Runners-up
- 3rd – Third place
- 4th – Fourth place
- QF – Quarterfinals
- R2 – Round 2
- R1 – Round 1
- – Hosts
- – Not affiliated to OFC
- Q – Qualified for upcoming tournament

Team	(Tunisia) 1977	(Japan) 1979	(Australia) 1981	(Mexico) 1983	(Soviet Union) 1985	(Chile) 1987	(Saudi Arabia) 1989	(Portugal) 1991	(Australia) 1993	(Qatar) 1995	(Malaysia) 1997	(Nigeria) 1999	(Argentina) 2001	(United Arab Emirates) 2003	(Netherlands) 2005	(Canada) 2007	(Egypt) 2009	(Colombia) 2011	(Turkey) 2013	(New Zealand) 2015	(South Korea) 2017	(Poland) 2019	(Argentina) 2023	(Chile) 2025	(Azerbaijan) (Uzbekistan) 2027	(Armenia) (Georgia (country)) 2029	Total
Australia			QF	R1	R1	R1		4th	4th	QF	R2	R1	R2	R1	R1	AFC member											12
Fiji																				R1			R1				2
New Caledonia																								R1			1
New Zealand																R1		R1	R1	R2	R2	R2	R2	R1			8
Tahiti																	R1					R1					2
Vanuatu																					R1						1
