= 1985 OFC U-20 Championship =

Tournament details
- Host country: Australia
- Dates: 15–24 February
- Teams: 6

Final positions
- Champions: Australia (3rd title)
- Runners-up: Israel
- Third place: New Zealand
- Fourth place: Taiwan

Tournament statistics
- Top scorer: (Australia) Kalantzis

The OFC U-20 Championship 1985 was held in Sydney, Australia. It also served as qualification for the 1985 FIFA World Youth Championship.

== Teams ==
The following teams entered the tournament:

- Australia (host)
- Fiji
- Israel
- New Zealand
- Papua New Guinea
- Taiwan

== Standings ==
Pos	Team	Pld	W	D	L	GF	GA	GD	Pts	Qualification
1	Australia (H)	5	5	0	0	20	4	+16	10	Qualification for 1985 FIFA World Youth Championship
2	Israel	5	3	1	1	15	6	+9	7	
3	New Zealand	5	3	0	2	21	9	+12	6	
4	Chinese Taipei	5	2	0	3	7	12	−5	4	
5	Fiji	5	1	1	3	9	12	−3	3	
6	Papua New Guinea	5	0	0	5	2	31	−29	0	

Source: RSSSF
(H) Hosts

== Matches ==
15 February	Fiji	5–1	Papua New Guinea
	Taiwan	1–3	Israel
	Australia	2–1	New Zealand
17 February	Israel	6–0	Papua New Guinea
	Taiwan	1–4	New Zealand
	Australia	6–1	Fiji
20 February	New Zealand	11–0	Papua New Guinea
	Israel	0–0	Fiji
	Australia	3–0	Taiwan
22 February	Taiwan	2–1	Fiji
	New Zealand	2–4	Israel
	Australia	6–0	Papua New Guinea
24 February	Taiwan	3–1	Papua New Guinea
	New Zealand	3–2	Fiji
	Australia	3–2	Israel

1985 OFC U-20 Championship

Australia
Third title

== Qualification to World Youth Championship ==
The tournament winner qualified for the 1985 FIFA World Youth Championship.

- Australia
