= Fiji national under-20 football team =

National association football team

Fiji U20
- Association: Fiji Football Association
- Confederation: OFC (Oceania)
- Head coach: (England) Bobby Mimms
- Captain: Thomas Dunn & Abdullah Aiyas
- Most caps: Praneel Naidu & Narendra Rao (12)
- Top scorer: Rusiate Matarerega (5)
- FIFA code: FIJ
First colours	Second colours

First international
- Fiji 1–1 New Zealand (Auckland, New Zealand; 11 November 1978)

Biggest win
- Fiji 10–1 Western Samoa (Suva, Fiji; 6 September 1988)

Biggest defeat
- Australia 11–0 Fiji (Melbourne, Australia; 21 December 2002)

World Cup
- Appearances: 2 (first in 2015)
- Best result: Group stage (2015, 2023)

OFC U-19 Men's Championship
- Appearances: 22 (first in 1978)
- Best result: Winners (2014)

The Fiji national under-20 football team is controlled by the Fiji Football Association and represents Fiji in international under-20 football competitions.

== Competitive record ==
=== FIFA U-20 World Cup record ===
FIFA U-20 World Cup record
Year	Round	GP	W	D	L	GS	GA
(Tunisia) 1977– (Turkey) 2013	did not qualify						
(New Zealand) 2015	Round 1	3	1	0	2	4	11
(South Korea) 2017– (Poland) 2019	did not qualify						
(Indonesia) ~~2021~~	Cancelled						
(Argentina) 2023	Round 1	3	0	0	3	0	16
(Chile) 2025- (Azerbaijan) (Uzbekistan) 2027	did not qualify						
(Armenia) (Georgia (country)) 2029	To be determined						
Total	2/26	6	1	0	5	4	27

=== OFC ===
The OFC Under 20 Qualifying Tournament is a tournament held once every two years to decide the two qualification spots for the Oceania Football Confederation (OFC) and its representatives at the FIFA U-20 World Cup.

OFC U-20 Championship
Year	Round	Position	Pld	W	D	L	GF	GA
(French Polynesia) 1974	Withdrew							
(New Zealand) 1978	Runners-up	2nd	3	1	1	1	6	6
(Fiji) 1980	Third place	3rd	3	2	1	0	10	7
(Papua New Guinea) 1982	Group stage		4	1	1	2	3	15
(Australia) 1985	Group stage		5	1	1	3	9	12
(New Zealand) 1986	Group stage		4	0	2	2	3	14
(Fiji) 1988	Fourth place	4th	5	1	1	3	13	10
(Fiji) 1990	Group stage		4	0	1	3	2	7
(French Polynesia) 1992	Group stage		4	2	0	2	11	7
(Fiji) 1994	Group stage		3	0	0	3	1	11
(French Polynesia) 1997	Group stage		4	1	1	2	6	16
(Samoa) 1998	Runners-up	2nd	5	3	0	2	13	6
(New Caledonia) (Cook Islands) 2001	Group stage		4	2	0	2	4	4
(Vanuatu) (Fiji) 2002	Runners-up	2nd	6	4	0	2	14	16
(Solomon Islands) 2005	Fourth place	4th	5	2	0	3	13	9
(New Zealand) 2007	Group stage		6	4	0	2	16	6
(French Polynesia) 2008	Group stage		3	0	0	3	0	8
(New Zealand) 2011	Fourth place	4th	5	1	1	3	5	11
(Fiji) 2013	Runners-up	2nd	4	3	0	1	8	8
(Fiji) 2014	Champions	1st	5	4	1	0	13	3
(Tonga) (Vanuatu) 2016	Group stage		3	0	2	1	2	3
(Cook Islands) (French Polynesia) 2018	Group stage		3	1	1	1	4	3
(French Polynesia) 2022	Runners-up	2nd	6	4	1	1	11	4
Total	1 title	22/23	85	33	12	41	150	180

Fiji's starting line-up against American Samoa, OFC U-20 Championship 2014

=== Current technical staff ===
Position	
Head Coach	(England) Bobby Mimms
Team Director	(Fiji) Ravindra Swamy
Manager	(New Zealand) Kartik Reddy
Assistant Coach	(Fiji) Ronil Lal
Assistant Coach	(Fiji) Marika Rodu
Team Doctor	(Fiji) Mousheen Khan
Physio	(Fiji) Varoon Karan

== Current squad ==
The following players were named in the squad for the 2023 FIFA U-20 World Cup, to be played in May-June 2023.

Caps and goals correct as of 21 February 2023, after the match against New Zealand.

No.	Pos.	Player	Date of birth (age)	Caps	Goals	Club
1	GK	Aydin Mustahib	28 May 2004 (age 22)	3	0	(New Zealand Football) Auckland United
13	GK	Joji Vuakaca	24 March 2003 (age 23)	0	0	(Fiji Football Association) Labasa
20	GK	Isikeli Sevanaia	11 January 2003 (age 23)	0	0	(Fiji Football Association) Nadroga
5	DF	Sakiusa Saqiri	11 June 2003 (age 23)	0	0	(Fiji Football Association) Tavua
7	DF	Arshad Khan	24 May 2004 (age 22)	0	0	(Football Australia) Macarthur Rams
16	DF	Gaery Kubu	28 April 2003 (age 23)	2	0	(Fiji Football Association) Tailevu Naitasari
17	DF	Mohammed Fataul	10 August 2003 (age 23)	1	0	(Fiji Football Association) Ba
18	DF	Samuel Navoce	22 July 2003 (age 23)	3	0	(Fiji Football Association) Ba
21	DF	Sterling Vasconcellos	19 April 2005 (age 21)	3	0	(Fiji Football Association) Lautoka
2	MF	Peter Ravai	25 March 2003 (age 23)	3	0	(Fiji Football Association) Rewa
3	MF	Eneriko Matau	10 January 2004 (age 22)	0	0	(Fiji Football Association) Nadi
4	MF	Abdullah Aiyas	26 September 2003 (age 23)	1	0	(Football Australia) Bonnyrigg White Eagles
6	MF	Thomas Dunn	19 January 2003 (age 23)	2	0	(Fiji Football Association) Navua
8	MF	Joshua Laqeretabua	26 September 2005 (age 21)	0	0	(The Football Association) Charlton Athletic
10	MF	Nabil Begg	17 March 2004 (age 22)	3	0	(Fiji Football Association) Ba
11	MF	Gulam Razool	29 January 2004 (age 22)	3	1	(Fiji Football Association) Ba
12	MF	Clarence Hussain	4 July 2003 (age 23)	3	0	(Fiji Football Association) Labasa
15	MF	Sailasa Ratu	3 February 2004 (age 22)	3	0	(Fiji Football Association) Tavua
19	MF	Junior Dekedeke	25 March 2003 (age 23)	1	0	(Fiji Football Association) Lautoka
9	FW	Faazil Faizul Ali	8 May 2003 (age 23)	1	0	(Fiji Football Association) Ba
14	FW	Apisai Rabuka	23 October 2004 (age 21)	0	0	(New Zealand Football) Coastal Spirit

== Fixtures and results ==
International Matches in last 12 months, and future scheduled matches

Win Draw Loss

== Head-to-head record ==
The following table shows Fiji's head-to-head record in the FIFA U-20 World Cup.

Opponent	Pld	W	D	L	GF	GA	GD	Win %}
Ecuador	1	0	0	1	0	9	−9	0.00
Germany	1	0	0	1	1	8	−7	0.00
Honduras	1	1	0	0	3	0	+3	100.00
Slovakia	1	0	0	1	0	4	−4	0.00
United States	1	0	0	1	0	3	−3	0.00
Uzbekistan	1	0	0	1	0	3	−3	0.00
Total	6	1	0	5	4	27	−23	16.67
