= 1980 OFC U-20 Championship =

Tournament details
- Host country: Fiji
- Dates: 7–13 December
- Teams: 6

Final positions
- Champions: New Zealand (1st title)
- Runners-up: Australia
- Third place: Fiji
- Fourth place: New Caledonia

The OFC U-20 Championship 1980 was held in Fiji. It also served as qualification for the intercontinental play-off for the 1981 FIFA World Youth Championship.

== Teams ==
The following teams entered the tournament:

- Australia
- Fiji (host)
- New Caledonia
- New Zealand
- Papua New Guinea
- Tahiti

== Group stage ==
=== Group 1 ===
Pos	Team	Pld	W	D	L	GF	GA	GD	Pts	Qualification
1	New Zealand	2	1	1	0	7	2	+5	3	Advance to Final
2	Fiji (H)	2	1	1	0	6	4	+2	3	Advance to Third place play-off
3	Papua New Guinea	2	0	0	2	2	9	−7	0	

Source: RSSSF
(H) Hosts

7 December	Fiji	2–2	New Zealand
9 December	New Zealand	5–0	Papua New Guinea
11 December	Fiji	4–2	Papua New Guinea

=== Group 2 ===
Pos	Team	Pld	W	D	L	GF	GA	GD	Pts	Qualification
1	Australia	2	2	0	0	7	1	+6	4	Advance to Final
2	New Caledonia	2	1	0	1	3	7	−4	2	Advance to Third place play-off
3	Tahiti	2	0	0	2	1	3	−2	0	

Source: RSSSF

6 December	Australia	1–0	Tahiti
9 December	Tahiti	1–2	New Caledonia
11 December	New Caledonia	1–6	Australia

== Third place play-off ==
13 December 1980

Fiji	4–3	New Caledonia

Fiji

== Final ==
13 December 1980

New Zealand	2–0	Australia

Fiji

1980 OFC U-20 Championship

New Zealand
First title

== Qualification to World Youth Championship ==
- Australia (host)

Tournament winners New Zealand failed to qualify for the 1981 FIFA World Youth Championship. They did not win in an intercontinental play-off group with Argentina and Israel. Matches were played at José Amalfitani Stadium in Buenos Aires, Argentina.

Teams	Pld	W	D	L	GF	GA	GD	Pts
Argentina	4	4	0	0	7	0	+7	8
New Zealand	4	1	1	2	2	5	–3	3
Israel	4	0	1	3	1	5	–4	1

18 March	New Zealand	0–0	Israel
20 March	Argentina	1–0	Israel
22 March	Argentina	1–0	New Zealand
25 March	Israel	1–2	New Zealand
27 March	Argentina	3–0	New Zealand
29 March	Argentina	2–0	Israel
