= 2008 OFC U-20 Championship =

Championnat d'Océanie de football des moins de 20 ans 2008

Tournament details
- Host country: Tahiti
- Dates: 13–17 December
- Teams: 4 (from 1 confederation)
- Venue: 3 (in 1 host city)

Final positions
- Champions: Tahiti (2nd title)
- Runners-up: New Caledonia
- Third place: New Zealand
- Fourth place: Fiji

Tournament statistics
- Matches played: 6
- Goals scored: 15 (2.5 per match)
- Top scorer(s): (New Zealand) Greg Draper (New Zealand) Costa Barbarouses (New Caledonia) Jean Wahnyamalla (New Caledonia) Alan Hnautra (2 goals)

The 2008 OFC Under 20 Qualifying Tournament was held in Papeete, Tahiti. The tournament was won by the host Tahiti after their final win against Fiji, and a 2–2 draw between New Caledonia and New Zealand, which prevented either team from qualification. This was the first tournament since 1974 to be won by a nation that was not Australia or New Zealand. As champions, Tahiti qualified for the 2009 FIFA U-20 World Cup.

== Participating teams ==
- Fiji
- New Caledonia
- New Zealand
- Tahiti

== Group stage ==
Nation	Pts	Pld	W	D	L	GF	GA	GD
Tahiti	7	3	2	1	0	4	1	+3
New Caledonia	5	3	1	2	0	5	2	+3
New Zealand	4	3	1	1	1	6	4	+2
Fiji	0	3	0	0	3	0	8	–8

=== Round 1 ===
13 December 2008
16:00 UTC-10

New Zealand	3–0	Fiji
Barbarouses 58'; McGeorge 64'; Draper 87'	Report

Stade Paea, Papeete
13 December 2008
18:30 UTC-10

Tahiti	0–0	New Caledonia

Stade Paea

15 December 2008
16:00 UTC-10

New Caledonia	3–0	Fiji
Hnautra 3'; Wahnyamalla 22', 34'	Report

Stade Mahina, Papeete
Referee: Lencie Fred (Vanuatu)
15 December 2008
18:30 UTC-10

New Zealand	1–2	Tahiti
Barbarouses 23'; McGeorge (red card) 44'	Report	Rochette 66'; Teriitau 89'

Stade Mahina, Papeete
Referee: Varman Rakesh (Fiji)

17 December 2008
16:00 UTC-10

New Caledonia	2–2	New Zealand
Hnautra 15'; Kayara 32'	Report	Draper 28'; Raj 73'

Stade Puurai, Papeete
Referee: Jacques Averii (Tahiti)
17 December 2008
18:30 UTC-10

Tahiti	2–0	Fiji
Tehau 10'; Kamoise 54'

Stade Puurai, Papeete

== Winner ==
2008 OFC Youth Championship winner

Tahiti
Second title

== Goal scorers ==
2 goals

- (New Caledonia) Alan Hnautra (NCL)
- (New Caledonia) Jean Wahnyamalla (NCL)
- (New Zealand) Greg Draper (NZL)
- (New Zealand) Costa Barbarouses (NZL)

1 goal

- (New Caledonia) Roy Kayara (NCL)
- (New Zealand) Adam McGeorge (NZL)
- (New Zealand) Jonathan Raj (NZL)
- (French Polynesia) Garry Rochette (TAH)
- (French Polynesia) Ariihau Teriitau (TAH)
- (French Polynesia) Alvin Tehau (TAH)
- (French Polynesia) Hiva Kamoise (TAH)

== See also ==
2009 FIFA U-20 World Cup
