= Australia men's national under-20 soccer team =

National youth sports team of Australia

Australia Under-20
- Nickname: Young Socceroos
- Association: Football Australia
- Confederation: AFC (Asia)
- Head coach: Trevor Morgan
- FIFA code: AUS
| First colours | Second colours |

First international
- Australia 9–0 Papua New Guinea (New Zealand; 11 November 1978)

Biggest win
- Tonga 0–19 Australia (Honiara, Solomon Islands; 25 January 2005)

Biggest defeat
- Australia 0–4 Brazil (Córdoba, Argentina; 27 June 2001); Australia 1–5 Spain (Manizales, Colombia; 6 August 2011); Australia 1–5 Vietnam (Kuala Lumpur, Malaysia; 7 October 2013); Australia 1–5 Thailand (Hanoi, Vietnam; 18 September 2016)

AFC U-20 Asian Cup
- Appearances: 9 (first in 2006)
- Best result: Champions (2025)

OFC U-19 Men's Championship
- Appearances: 13 (first in 1978)
- Best result: Champions (1978, 1982, 1985, 1986, 1988, 1990, 1994, 1997, 1998, 2001, 2002, 2005)

FIFA U-20 World Cup
- Appearances: 16 (first in 1981)
- Best result: Fourth place (1991, 1993)
- Website: https://www.socceroos.com.au/young-socceroos-u20s

The Australia national under-20 soccer team, known colloquially as the Young Socceroos, represents Australia in international under-20 soccer. The team is controlled by the governing body for soccer in Australia, Football Australia (FA), which is currently a member of the Asian Football Confederation (AFC) and the regional ASEAN Football Federation (AFF) since leaving the Oceania Football Confederation (OFC) in 2006. The team's official nickname is the Young Socceroos.

The team has won twelve OFC titles, one AFC title, and six AFF titles. They have represented Australia at the FIFA U-20 World Cup tournaments on 15 occasions with their best result being a fourth-place finish in 1991 and 1993.

== History ==
=== 2006 AFC U-19 Championship ===
In their first foray into Asia in 2006 the team lost the quarterfinals of the AFC Youth Championship, to South Korea, despite being considered one of the stronger teams. This was the first time the Young Socceroos had failed to qualify for the FIFA U-20 World Cup since 1989. Subsequently, on 5 February 2007 the FFA decided not to renew Ange Postecoglou's contract as head coach, he was replaced by former Socceroo, and AIS head coach Steve O'Connor.

=== 2008 AFC U-19 Championship ===
On 24 June 2008 Jan Versleijen was appointed as the new U-20 coach ahead of the 2008 tournament, with the FFA eager to avoid a repeat of 2006, and qualify for the 2009 FIFA U-20 World Cup in Egypt. In preparation for the tournament, Australia competed in the 2008 ASEAN Youth Championships in Thailand alongside China, Korea Republic and Thailand. A competition they ultimately won through a penalty shoot-out against South Korea. The 2008 AFC U-19 Championship was hosted by Saudi Arabia. Australia topped Group D with wins over Thailand and Jordan and a 1–1 draw with Uzbekistan. Australia then needed an extra time winner from Mitch Nichols to overcome North Korea in the quarter-final before losing 3–0 to UAE in the semi-final. However, making it through to the semi-final was enough to qualify for the 2009 FIFA U-20 World Cup.

=== 2009 FIFA U-20 World Cup ===
Australia qualified for the 2009 FIFA U-20 World Cup in Egypt after finishing in the final four of the 2008 AFC U-19 Championship. Despite a late James Holland penalty, Australia lost their opening game to the Czech Republic 2–1 before Costa Rica defeated the 'Young Socceroos' 3–0. In the final group game against Brazil, Aaron Mooy gave Australia an early lead however the final result saw Brazil win 3–1 and Australia was eliminated without a point.

=== 2010 AFC U-19 Championship ===
To qualify for the tournament, Australia travelled to Bandung, Indonesia in November 2009 for the qualification group and proceeded after finishing second in a group of six nations. Wins over Hong Kong, Chinese Taipei and Singapore proceeded to a 0–0 draw with the hosts, Indonesia and a loss to Japan.

Australia competed in the 2010 AFC Under 19 Championship Finals held in Zibo, China.

The tournament was held from 3 to 17 October 2010 in Shandong province. The matches were played at the Zibo Sports Complex Stadium and Linzi Stadium.

Wins over Yemen and Iran followed by a 0–0 draw with South Korea meant Australia topped the group on goal difference. In the quarter-final against United Arab Emirates, Australia twice led before UAE equalised and took the game to extra time. Two extra time goals for Australia set up a semi-final with Saudi Arabia, which Australia won 2–0 thanks to a Kerem Bulut double. The final was played on 17 October 2010 against North Korea. Despite leading in the first half, Australia couldn't hold on and lost the final 3–2. Kerem Bulut was the tournament's top scorer with 7 goals. Australia qualified for the 2011 FIFA U-20 World Cup to be held in Colombia.

=== 2011 FIFA U-20 World Cup ===
Australia qualified for the 2011 FIFA U-20 World Cup in Colombia after finishing in the final four of the 2010 AFC U-19 Championship. Australia was drawn in a group comprising Spain, Ecuador & Costa Rica.

Australia failed to progress out of the group after finishing last with one point. The first fixture resulted in a one all draw with Ecuador after Tommy Oar scored a late equaliser. The next game saw Costa Rica defeat Australia 3–2. In the final game against Spain, Australia was down by four goals after just 18 minutes. In the 27th minute Kerem Bulut grabbed a goal back before Spain made it 5–1 with a 31st-minute penalty. This was to be the final score.

=== 2012 AFC U-19 Championship ===
To participate in the 2012 AFC U-19 Championship the Young Socceroos first had to qualify. The confederation was geographically separated and Australia was grouped with other East Asian nations, China, Indonesia, Singapore and Macau. These five nations met in Malaysia in November 2011 and Australia proceeded through the group by winning all four games, scoring 20 goals and conceding just 1.

The 2012 AFC U-19 Championship was hosted by United Arab Emirates in November. Australia was seeded for the tournament along with the hosts and South Korea and North Korea. Australia's opening game was against Qatar. The only goal of the game came in the 11th minute for Australia when Corey Gameiro scored. Gameiro was on the scoresheet in both of the following group games when his 81st-minute equaliser against Syria and his 91st-minute equaliser against Saudi Arabia meant both games finished 1–1. The critical late goal to Saudi Arabia meant Australia not only proceeded on to the next stage at the expense of the Saudis but also topped the group.

Australia took on Jordan in the quarter-final and it was Gameiro scoring all three goals in a 3–0 win that put Australia through to the semi-final and secured qualification to the 2013 FIFA U-20 World Cup in Turkey. Two second half goals to Iraq meant Australia were eliminated from the tournament. Gameiro's six goals were one short of the top goalscorer award.

=== 2013 FIFA U-20 World Cup ===
Paul Okon coached Australia in the 2013 FIFA U-20 World Cup in Turkey where they failed to win a game despite scoring the first goal in all 3 fixtures. Daniel De Silva gave Australia the lead before Colombia levelled the game at 1–1. Joshua Brillante scored early before El Salvador scored twice before halftime and Jamie Maclaren scored in the 52nd minute but again Australia couldn't hold on with the hosts, with Turkey scoring twice. These results mean Australia has failed to win in any of their last 13 U-20 World Cup fixtures with the last victory coming over Brazil on 4 December 2003.

=== 2014 AFC U-19 Championship ===
Australia started the 2014 AFC U-19 Championship campaign by participating in the qualifiers in October 2013. They travelled to Malaysia where they were joined by Vietnam, Hong Kong and Chinese Taipei. Mongolia had withdrawn. The first game was an easy 7–0 win over Hong Kong. Peter Skapetis scored four goals. They then defeated Chinese Taipei 3–0 before a humiliating 5–1 loss to Vietnam. Despite this, Australia was to proceed to the finals tournament as one of the best second placed teams.

The 2014 AFC U-19 Championship was hosted by Myanmar in October 2014. Paul Okon again was head coach of the Young Socceroos for the tournament. The opening game was against United Arab Emirates. Brandon Borrello gave Australia a late lead but an 85th-minute penalty to the UAE saw the score end in a draw. The second match was a 1–0 win over Indonesia through a Jaushua Sotirio goal. The final group game had Australia leading Uzbekistan in the 66th minute thanks to Stefan Mauk. However, an 82nd-minute equaliser would prove devastating for Australia as this, and the result in the concurrent game placed UAE, Uzbekistan and Australia all on five points with Australia having the inferior goal difference and hence elimination from the tournament. Many observers sighted Australia's lack of desire to score more goals against Indonesia as the contributing factor to the elimination. Australia failed to qualify for the New Zealand 2015 FIFA U-20 World Cup. This is just the second time since 1989 that Australia hasn't competed in the biennial event.

=== 2016 AFC U-19 Championship ===
Australia qualified for the 2016 AFC U-19 Championship that was held in Bahrain in October 2016. In the qualifiers hosted by Laos, they finished runner-up in their group and progressed on goal difference as one of the five best second placed teams. Comfortable wins over Philippines and Laos were followed by a heavy 3–0 loss to Japan. Steve Kuzmanovski finished as Australia's top scorer with three goals. This was the sixth consecutive U-19 Championship that Australia qualified for.

Australia was coached by Ufuk Talay for the tournament and was drawn into Group D. The opening fixture was a 1–0 victory against China through a goal to Mario Shabow. The second game was against Uzbekistan. The Uzbeks led by three until they suffered a send off. Australia then responded through two second half penalties to Liam Youlley and George Blackwood however the final result was a 3–2 win for Uzbekistan. Australia needed to win against Tajikistan in the final group game to progress. Anthony Kalik had an early penalty saved and was later sent off for two yellow cards. The game finished 0–0 and Australia were eliminated from the tournament. As a consequence, they also failed to qualify for the 2017 FIFA U-20 World Cup. This is the first time that Australia has failed to qualify for two consecutive U-20 World Cups.

=== 2018 AFC U-19 Championship ===
The 2018 AFC U-19 Championship was hosted by Indonesia in October and November. Australia commenced their qualification for the tournament in Vietnam. The matches had originally been scheduled to be played in Shepparton, Victoria however the Australian government refused entry to the North Korean squad. As a result, the matches were moved to neutral Vietnam although the costs associated with the shift in venue saw Northern Mariana Islands withdraw. This left just two opponents in the group, North Korea and Hong Kong. In Australia's first match against Hong Kong, Ramy Najjarine scored early and then a late double from Moudi Najjar gave Australia a 3–0 win. They then defeated North Korea 4–1 with goals again to Najjarine and Najjar as well as Fabian Monge and Denis Genreau.

With Ante Milicic now in charge, Australia started the tournament against South Korea in Bekasi. The Koreans scored first in the 55th minute however Najjarine curled in an 89th-minute equaliser to share the points. The second match was against Vietnam which Australia won 2–1 through goals to Angus Thurgate and Ben Folami. Reports emerged after the game that many of the Australian squad had been suffering from illness. In their last group match against Jordan, Australia needed at least a draw to advance and they finished 1–1, with Oliver Puflett scoring the goal in the 10th minute. In the quarter-final, Australia lost 3–1 to Saudi Arabia, with Nathaniel Atkinson scoring their only goal. Elimination at the quarter-final stage meant that Australia failed to qualify for the Under-20 World Cup for a record third consecutive time.

=== 2023 AFC U-20 Asian Cup ===
Australia were drawn in Group B alongside Vietnam, Iran and Qatar. They had a disappointing start, lost 0–1 against Vietnam, but bounced back with a 3–2 win over Iran and a 9–1 thrashing of Qatar, which help them qualify for the quarter-finals as group runners-up.

In the quarter-finals, Australia faced the home team Uzbekistan. Playing with host, Australia had to endure a series of fierce pressure but unexpectedly took the lead in the 77th minute thanks to Gabriel Popovic, but just 2 minutes later the team was equalized by Uzbekistan thanks to a goal by Zafarmurod Abdurakhmatov. The two teams drew 1–1 after 90 minutes of regulation and 30 minutes of extra time. In the penalty shootout, Australia lost 4–5, bitterly watching the home team win the right to enter the semi-finals along with a ticket to the 2023 FIFA U-20 World Cup.

=== 2025 AFC U-20 Asian Cup ===
Australia were drawn in Group A alongside host team China, Qatar and Kyrgyzstan. The team won all 3 group stage matches, earning 9 points and taking top spot in Group A. In the quarter-finals, Australia defeated Iraq 3–2, with a late winner from Alex Badolato helping the team qualify for the semi-finals and return to the U-20 World Cup after 12 years. Entering the semi-finals against a Japan, the team defeated Japan 2–0.

Australia qualified for the final against Saudi Arabia. Australia scored early through Louis Agosti in the 24th minute but could not maintain the lead. Saudi Arabia scored a late first half equaliser through Talal Haji in first half injury time. The two teams were tied 1–1 after 90 minutes of regulation and 30 minutes of extra time. In the penalty shootout, Australia won 5–4, thereby winning the AFC U-20 Asian Cup for the first time and the first Asian youth football championship since Australia joined the AFC.

=== 2025 FIFA U-20 World Cup ===
By finishing among the top four teams at the 2025 U-20 Asian Cup, Australia qualified for the 2025 FIFA U-20 World Cup in Chile. The team was drawn in Group D alongside Italy, Argentina and Cuba.

They lost their first match against Italy 1–0 and lost the second match to Argentina 4–1 with the single goal scored by Daniel Bennie. In their third group match, Australia defeated Cuba 3–1 with a goal from Bennie and two goals scored by Max Caputo.

Australia finished third in the group, but were not ranked among the best third place teams that would progress to the knockout stage.

== Players ==
=== Current squad ===
The following 23 players were called up to the squad for the 2027 AFC U-20 Asian Cup qualification phase on 31 August – 6 September 2026.

Caps and goals correct as of 6 September 2026, after the match against Indonesia.

| No. | Pos. | Player | Date of birth (age) | Caps | Goals | Club |
|---|---|---|---|---|---|---|
| 1 | GK | Robbie Cook | 27 January 2007 (age 19) | 4 | 0 | (The Football Association) Leeds United |
| 12 | GK | Jai Ajanovic | 31 August 2008 (age 18) | 4 | 0 | (Football Australia) Central Coast Mariners |
| 18 | GK | George Plusnin | 27 December 2007 (age 18) | 0 | 0 | (Football Australia) Brisbane Roar |
| 2 | DF | Peter Antoniou | 29 January 2007 (age 19) | 5 | 1 | (Football Australia) Melbourne City |
| 3 | DF | Lewis Marinucci | 10 June 2007 (age 19) | 7 | 1 | (Football Australia) Melbourne Victory |
| 4 | DF | Feyzo Kasumovic | 18 January 2008 (age 18) | 0 | 0 | (Football Australia) Adelaide United |
| 5 | DF | Archie Trimboli | 3 August 2008 (age 18) | 2 | 0 | (The Football Association) Brentford |
| 13 | DF | Jasper Chipman | 18 June 2007 (age 19) | 2 | 0 | (Football Australia) Manly United |
| 16 | DF | Alex Bolton | 12 May 2008 (age 18) | 4 | 0 | (Football Australia) Central Coast Mariners |
| 22 | DF | Emile Katrib | 17 July 2009 (age 17) | 1 | 0 | (Football Australia) Western Sydney Wanderers |
| 23 | DF | Luka Didulica | 18 September 2007 (age 19) | 3 | 0 | (Japan Football Association) Urawa Red Diamonds |
| 6 | MF | Danilo Treffiletti | 31 January 2008 (age 18) | 4 | 0 | (Italian Football Federation) Monza |
| 7 | MF | Beckham Baker | 8 August 2008 (age 18) | 3 | 0 | (Football Australia) Melbourne City |
| 8 | MF | Haine Eames | 27 February 2008 (age 18) | 9 | 0 | (Football Australia) Central Coast Mariners |
| 10 | MF | Will Dobson | 7 September 2007 (age 19) | 4 | 1 | (Football Australia) Newcastle Jets |
| 14 | MF | Jesse Mantell | 14 January 2007 (age 19) | 1 | 0 | (Football Australia) Central Coast Mariners |
| 15 | MF | Jai Rose | 22 December 2007 (age 18) | 7 | 0 | (Football Australia) Western Sydney Wanderers |
| 17 | MF | Michael Pratezina | 28 April 2008 (age 18) | 3 | 0 | (Football Australia) Macarthur FC |
| 20 | MF | Oliver Dragicevic | 10 October 2007 (age 19) | 1 | 0 | (Football Australia) Melbourne Victory |
| 9 | FW | Alaat Abdul-Rahman | 4 April 2007 (age 19) | 2 | 1 | (Football Australia) Western Sydney Wanderers |
| 11 | FW | Arthur De Lima | 11 June 2007 (age 19) | 9 | 0 | (Football Australia) Central Coast Mariners |
| 19 | FW | Mikey Ghossaini | 25 August 2007 (age 19) | 3 | 0 | (Football Australia) Melbourne Victory |
| 21 | FW | Marcus Neill | 2 June 2008 (age 18) | 8 | 2 | (The Football Association) Sunderland |

=== Recent call-ups ===
The following players have been called up within the last 12 months and remain eligible for selection.

| Pos. | Player | Date of birth (age) | Caps | Goals | Club | Latest call-up |
|---|---|---|---|---|---|---|
| GK | Lachlan Charles | 24 April 2007 (age 19) | 0 | 0 | (Australia) Melbourne City | 2026 ASEAN U-19 Boys' Championship, 1–13 June 2026 |
| GK | Daniel Graskoski | 28 January 2007 (age 19) | 5 | 0 | (Australia) Melbourne Victory | 2026 ASEAN U-19 Boys' Championship, 1–13 June 2026 |
| DF | Alexander Garbowski^{INJ} | 22 February 2008 (age 18) | 0 | 0 | (Sweden) Häcken | 2027 AFC U-20 Asian Cup qualification^{PRE}, 31 August – 6 September 2026 |
| DF | Delano Cecchi | 31 May 2008 (age 18) | 2 | 0 | (Italy) Sampdoria | 2026 ASEAN U-19 Boys' Championship, 1–13 June 2026 |
| DF | Max Cooper | 14 January 2007 (age 19) | 1 | 0 | (Australia) Newcastle Jets | 2026 ASEAN U-19 Boys' Championship, 1–13 June 2026 |
| DF | Mikael Evagorou-Alao | 19 April 2007 (age 19) | 0 | 0 | (Australia) Brisbane Roar | 2026 ASEAN U-19 Boys' Championship, 1–13 June 2026 |
| DF | Jayden Necovski | 28 March 2008 (age 18) | 2 | 0 | (Australia) Melbourne City | v. China, 31 March 2026 |
| DF | Gabriel Tilo | 5 November 2008 (age 18) | 2 | 0 | (Australia) Sydney United 58 | v. China, 31 March 2026 |
| DF | James Overy^{INJ} | 9 November 2007 (age 19) | 4 | 0 | (England) Manchester United | v. China, 28 March 2026 |
| MF | Lawrence Wong | 6 October 2007 (age 19) | 5 | 0 | (Australia) Melbourne City | 2027 AFC U-20 Asian Cup qualification^{PRE}, 31 August – 6 September 2026 |
| MF | Nickolas Alfaro | 2 February 2008 (age 18) | 0 | 0 | (Australia) Sydney FC | 2026 ASEAN U-19 Boys' Championship, 1–13 June 2026 |
| MF | Harry Crawford | 3 February 2007 (age 19) | 0 | 0 | (Australia) Adelaide United | 2026 ASEAN U-19 Boys' Championship, 1–13 June 2026 |
| MF | Alex Nunes | 22 February 2007 (age 19) | 0 | 0 | (Australia) Newcastle Jets | 2026 ASEAN U-19 Boys' Championship, 1–13 June 2026 |
| MF | Max Anastasio | 30 April 2008 (age 18) | 5 | 0 | (Italy) AC Milan | v. China, 31 March 2026 |
| MF | Giovanni de Abreu | 16 April 2007 (age 19) | 2 | 0 | (Australia) Perth Glory | v. China, 31 March 2026 |
| MF | Quinn MacNicol | 10 January 2008 (age 18) | 4 | 1 | (Australia) Melbourne City | v. China, 31 March 2026 |
| FW | Mathias Macallister | 12 April 2007 (age 19) | 4 | 1 | (Australia) Sydney FC | 2027 AFC U-20 Asian Cup qualification^{PRE}, 31 August – 6 September 2026 |
| FW | Medin Memeti | 20 June 2007 (age 19) | 0 | 0 | (Australia) Melbourne City | 2027 AFC U-20 Asian Cup qualification^{PRE}, 31 August – 6 September 2026 |
| FW | Amlani Tatu | 1 July 2008 (age 18) | 2 | 1 | (Australia) Adelaide United | 2027 AFC U-20 Asian Cup qualification^{PRE}, 31 August – 6 September 2026 |

- ^{INJ} Withdrew due to an injury.

== Results and fixtures ==
- The following is a list of match results in the last 12 months, as well as any future matches that have been scheduled.

Legend

Win Draw Loss Fixture

=== 2026 ===
| 28 March Australia-China Friendship Series | China | 1–0 | Australia | Yiwu, China |
| 18:00 AEDT | Yang Mingrui 31' | Report | | Stadium: Yiwu Meihu Sports Centre; Attendance: 10,937 |

| 31 March Australia-China Friendship Series | China | 2–4 | Australia | Yiwu, China |
| | Yang Mingrui 67', 87' | Report | Macallister 48' (pen.); Antoniou 56'; Dobson 76'; Tatu 82' | Stadium: Yiwu Meihu Sports Centre; Attendance: 6,500 |

| 3 June ASEAN U19 Championship GS | Philippines | 0–10 | Australia | Deli Serdang, Indonesia |
| 20:00 UTC+7 | | Report | Memeti 7' (pen.), 26', 41', 65', 71'; Wong 58', 61'; Nunes 64' (pen.); Macallister 70', 82' | Stadium: Madya Stadium; Referee: Ryo Tanimoto (Japan) |

| 9 June ASEAN U19 Championship GS | Australia | 2–2 | Cambodia | Deli Serdang, Indonesia |
| 20:00 UTC+7 | Neil 3'; Nunes 18' | Report | Sokea 59'; Marinucci 82' (o.g.) | Stadium: Madya Stadium; Referee: Zakaria Ismail (Malaysia) |

| 11 June ASEAN U19 Championship SF | Indonesia | 0–1 | Australia | Deli Serdang, Indonesia |
| 20:15 UTC+7 | | Report | Neill 89' | Stadium: North Sumatra Stadium; Referee: Alimardon Bainazarov (Kyrgyzstan) |

| 13 June ASEAN U19 Championship F | Thailand | 0–2 | Australia | Deli Serdang, Indonesia |
| 20:15 UTC+7 | | Report | Garbowski 41'; Baker 90+7' | Stadium: North Sumatra Stadium |

| 31 August 2027 AFC U-20 Asian Cup qualifiers | Laos | 0–2 | Australia | Vientiane, Laos |
| 19:00 ICT | | Report | Neill 13' (pen.); Marinucci 49' | Stadium: New Laos National Stadium; Referee: Omar Al-Yaqoubi (Oman) |

| 3 September 2027 AFC U-20 Asian Cup qualifiers | Malaysia | 2–2 | Australia | Vientiane, Laos |
| 16:00 ICT | Fadhlul Hadi 50'; Izzuddin Afif 70' | Report | Neill 4'; Abdul-Rahman 82' | Stadium: New Laos National Stadium; Referee: Zayniddin Alimov (Kyrgyzstan) |

| 6 September 2027 AFC U-20 Asian Cup qualifiers | Australia | 0–2 | Indonesia | Vientiane, Laos |
| 16:00 ICT | | Report | Leeming 28'; Brkić 90' | Stadium: New Laos National Stadium; Referee: Omar Al-Yaqoubi (Oman) |

== Records ==
=== Players with most appearances ===
As of 3 June 2012
Players in bold are still available for selection.

| # | Name | Caps | Goals |
|---|---|---|---|
| 1 | Tommy Oar | 33 | 4 |
| 1 | Mark Birighitti | 33 | 0 |
| 3 | Kofi Danning | 30 | 3 |
| 4 | Matthew Jurman | 26 | 0 |
| 5 | Ben Kantarovski | 25 | 2 |
| 5 | James Holland | 25 | 5 |
| 7 | Andrew Redmayne | 24 | 0 |
| 7 | Craig Moore | 24 | 0 |
| 7 | Scott McDonald | 24 | 16 |
| 7 | Dylan McGowan | 24 | 4 |

=== Players with most Goals Scored ===
As of 23 June 2013
Players in bold are still available for selection.

| # | Name | Goals | Caps |
|---|---|---|---|
| 1 | Mark Viduka | 32 | 20 |
| 2 | Scott McDonald | 16 | 24 |
| 3 | Kostas Salapasidis | 13 | 14 |
| 4 | Kevork Gulesserian | 12 | 12 |
| 5 | Kerem Bulut | 10 | 14 |
| 5 | David Williams | 10 | 12 |
| 7 | Nick Carle | 9 | 16 |
| 7 | Jamie Maclaren | 9 | 16 |
| 8 | Ante Milicic | 8 | 12 |
| 8 | Michael Ferrante | 8 | 10 |
| 8 | Greg Owens | 8 | 15 |

== Competitive record ==
=== FIFA U-20 World Cup ===
| Year | Result | Position | Pld | W | D | L | GF | GA |
|---|---|---|---|---|---|---|---|---|
| (Tunisia) 1977 | did not participate | | | | | | | |
| (Japan) 1979 | did not participate | | | | | | | |
| (Australia) 1981 | Quarter-finals | 7th | 4 | 1 | 2 | 1 | 6 | 6 |
| (Mexico) 1983 | Group stage | 9th | 3 | 1 | 1 | 1 | 4 | 4 |
| (Soviet Union) 1985 | Group stage | 11th | 3 | 0 | 2 | 1 | 2 | 3 |
| (Chile) 1987 | Group stage | 12th | 3 | 1 | 0 | 2 | 2 | 6 |
| (Saudi Arabia) 1989 | did not qualify | | | | | | | |
| (Portugal) 1991 | Fourth place | **4th** | 6 | 3 | 2 | 1 | 6 | 3 |
| (Australia) 1993 | Fourth place | **4th** | 6 | 3 | 0 | 3 | 8 | 9 |
| (Qatar) 1995 | Quarter-finals | 7th | 4 | 1 | 1 | 2 | 6 | 6 |
| (Malaysia) 1997 | Round of 16 | 10th | 4 | 2 | 1 | 1 | 5 | 4 |
| (Nigeria) 1999 | Group stage | 18th | 3 | 1 | 0 | 2 | 4 | 8 |
| (Argentina) 2001 | Round of 16 | 16th | 4 | 1 | 1 | 2 | 3 | 8 |
| (United Arab Emirates) 2003 | Round of 16 | 10th | 4 | 2 | 1 | 1 | 6 | 5 |
| (Netherlands) 2005 | Group stage | 20th | 3 | 0 | 2 | 1 | 2 | 5 |
| (Canada) 2007 | did not qualify | | | | | | | |
| (Egypt) 2009 | Group stage | 23rd | 3 | 0 | 0 | 3 | 2 | 8 |
| (Colombia) 2011 | Group stage | 21st | 3 | 0 | 1 | 2 | 4 | 9 |
| (Turkey) 2013 | Group stage | 21st | 3 | 0 | 1 | 2 | 3 | 5 |
| (New Zealand) 2015 | did not qualify | | | | | | | |
| (South Korea) 2017 | did not qualify | | | | | | | |
| (Poland) 2019 | did not qualify | | | | | | | |
| (Argentina) 2023 | did not qualify | | | | | | | |
| (Chile) 2025 | Group stage | 17th | 3 | 1 | 0 | 2 | 4 | 6 |
| (Azerbaijan) (Uzbekistan) 2027 | did not qualify | | | | | | | |
| (Armenia) (Georgia (country)) 2029 | to be determined | | | | | | | |
| **Total** | 16/25 | **4th** | 59 | 17 | 15 | 27 | 67 | 95 |

=== OFC U-19 Men's Championship ===
| Year | Round | Pos | Pld | W | D | L | GF | GA |
|---|---|---|---|---|---|---|---|---|
| (French Polynesia) 1974 | Did not enter | | | | | | | |
| (New Zealand) 1978 | **Champion** | **1st** | **3** | **3** | **0** | **0** | **16** | **2** |
| (Fiji) 1980 | Runner-up | 2nd | 3 | 2 | 0 | 1 | 7 | 3 |
| (Papua New Guinea) 1982 | **Champion** | **1st** | **4** | **4** | **0** | **0** | **15** | **4** |
| (Australia) 1985 | **Champion** | **1st** | **5** | **5** | **0** | **0** | **20** | **4** |
| (New Zealand) 1986 | **Champion** | **1st** | **4** | **3** | **1** | **0** | **16** | **1** |
| (Fiji) 1988 | **Champion** | **1st** | **4** | **4** | **0** | **0** | **16** | **3** |
| (Fiji) 1990 | **Champion** | **1st** | 4 | 4 | 0 | 0 | 22 | **0** |
| (French Polynesia) 1992 | Did not enter | | | | | | | |
| (Fiji) 1994 | **Champion** | **1st** | **5** | **5** | **0** | **0** | **29** | **0** |
| (French Polynesia) 1997 | **Champion** | **1st** | **4** | **4** | **0** | **0** | **25** | **1** |
| (Samoa) 1998 | **Champion** | **1st** | **5** | **5** | **0** | **0** | **23** | **2** |
| (Cook Islands) (New Caledonia) 2001 | **Champion** | **1st** | **7** | **6** | **0** | **1** | **50** | **3** |
| (Fiji) (Vanuatu) 2002 | **Champion** | **1st** | **4** | **4** | **0** | **0** | **23** | **0** |
| (Solomon Islands) 2005 | **Champion** | **1st** | **5** | **5** | **0** | **0** | **46** | **5** |
| Total | 12 titles | 13/15 | 57 | 54 | 1 | 2 | 308 | 28 |

=== AFC U-20 Asian Cup ===
| Year | Result | Position | Pld | W | D | L | GF | GA |
|---|---|---|---|---|---|---|---|---|
| (India) 2006 | Quarter-finals | 8th | 4 | 2 | 0 | 2 | 6 | 4 |
| (Saudi Arabia) 2008 | Semi-finals | **3rd** | 5 | 3 | 1 | 1 | 6 | 6 |
| (China) 2010 | Runner-up | **2nd** | 6 | 4 | 1 | 1 | 15 | 6 |
| (United Arab Emirates) 2012 | Semi-finals | **4th** | 5 | 2 | 2 | 1 | 6 | 4 |
| (Myanmar) 2014 | Group Stage | 9th | 3 | 1 | 2 | 0 | 3 | 2 |
| (Bahrain) 2016 | Group Stage | 11th | 3 | 1 | 1 | 1 | 3 | 3 |
| (Indonesia) 2018 | Quarter-finals | 6th | 4 | 1 | 2 | 1 | 5 | 6 |
| (Uzbekistan) ~~2020~~ | Competition cancelled | | | | | | | |
| (Uzbekistan) 2023 | Quarter-finals | 5th | 4 | 2 | 1 | 1 | 13 | 5 |
| (China) **2025** | **Champions** | **1st** | **6** | **5** | **1** | **0** | **16** | **6** |
| (China) 2027 | did not qualify | | | | | | | |
| (China) 2029 | to be determined | | | | | | | |
| Total | 9/10 | 1 Title | 40 | 21 | 11 | 8 | 73 | 42 |

=== ASEAN U-19 Boys' Championship ===
| Year | Result | Position | Pld | W | D | L | GF | GA |
|---|---|---|---|---|---|---|---|---|
| (Malaysia) 2006 | Champion | **1st** | 3 | 3 | 0 | 0 | 8 | 0 |
| (Vietnam) 2007 | did not enter | | | | | | | |
| (Thailand) 2008 | Champion | **1st** | 3 | 2 | 1 | 0 | 5 | 2 |
| (Vietnam) 2009 | Runner-up | **2nd** | 5 | 2 | 2 | 1 | 11 | 4 |
| (Vietnam) 2010 | Champion | **1st** | 3 | 2 | 1 | 0 | 6 | 2 |
| (Myanmar) 2011 | did not enter | | | | | | | |
| (Vietnam) 2012 | Third place | **3rd** | 3 | 1 | 0 | 2 | 6 | 6 |
| (Indonesia) 2013 | Withdrew | | | | | | | |
| (Vietnam) 2014 | Group stage | 5th | 2 | 0 | 0 | 2 | 3 | 5 |
| (Laos) 2015 | Withdrew | | | | | | | |
| (Vietnam) 2016 | Champion | **1st** | 7 | 6 | 0 | 1 | 21 | 10 |
| (Myanmar) 2017 | did not enter | | | | | | | |
| (Indonesia) 2018 | did not enter | | | | | | | |
| (Vietnam) 2019 | Champion | **1st** | 7 | 6 | 0 | 1 | 20 | 7 |
| (Indonesia) 2022 | did not enter | | | | | | | |
| (Indonesia) 2024 | Third place | **3rd** | 5 | 3 | 1 | 1 | 14 | 4 |
| (Indonesia) 2026 | Champion | **1st** | 4 | 3 | 1 | 0 | 15 | 2 |
| **Total** | 10/17 | **6 Titles** | 42 | 28 | 6 | 6 | 109 | 42 |

== Head-to-head record ==
The following table shows Australia's head-to-head record in the FIFA U-20 World Cup and AFC U-20 Asian Cup.

=== In FIFA U-20 World Cup ===
| Opponent | Pld | W | D | L | GF | GA | GD | Win % |
|---|---|---|---|---|---|---|---|---|
| Angola | 1 | 0 | 1 | 0 | 1 | 1 | +0 | 0.00 |
| Argentina | 3 | 2 | 0 | 1 | 7 | 8 | −1 | 66.67 |
| Benin | 1 | 0 | 1 | 0 | 1 | 1 | +0 | 0.00 |
| Brazil | 4 | 1 | 0 | 3 | 4 | 11 | −7 | 25.00 |
| Cameroon | 3 | 0 | 1 | 2 | 5 | 8 | −3 | 0.00 |
| Canada | 3 | 1 | 2 | 0 | 2 | 1 | +1 | 33.33 |
| Chile | 1 | 0 | 0 | 1 | 0 | 2 | −2 | 0.00 |
| Costa Rica | 3 | 1 | 0 | 2 | 4 | 6 | −2 | 33.33 |
| Colombia | 2 | 1 | 1 | 0 | 3 | 2 | +1 | 50.00 |
| Cuba | 1 | 1 | 0 | 0 | 3 | 1 | +2 | 100.00 |
| Czech Republic | 3 | 0 | 1 | 2 | 2 | 6 | −4 | 0.00 |
| Ecuador | 1 | 0 | 1 | 0 | 1 | 1 | +0 | 0.00 |
| Egypt | 1 | 1 | 0 | 0 | 1 | 0 | +1 | 100.00 |
| El Salvador | 1 | 0 | 0 | 1 | 1 | 2 | −1 | 0.00 |
| England | 2 | 0 | 1 | 1 | 2 | 3 | −1 | 0.00 |
| Germany | 2 | 0 | 1 | 1 | 1 | 2 | −1 | 0.00 |
| Hungary | 1 | 1 | 0 | 0 | 1 | 0 | +1 | 100.00 |
| Italy | 1 | 0 | 0 | 1 | 0 | 1 | −1 | 0.00 |
| Japan | 3 | 1 | 1 | 1 | 3 | 2 | +1 | 33.33 |
| Mexico | 2 | 0 | 1 | 1 | 2 | 4 | −2 | 0.00 |
| Netherlands | 1 | 0 | 0 | 1 | 0 | 3 | −3 | 0.00 |
| Nigeria | 1 | 0 | 0 | 1 | 2 | 3 | −1 | 0.00 |
| Portugal | 2 | 0 | 0 | 2 | 1 | 3 | −2 | 0.00 |
| Scotland | 1 | 1 | 0 | 0 | 2 | 1 | +1 | 100.00 |
| Republic of Ireland | 1 | 0 | 0 | 1 | 0 | 4 | −4 | 0.00 |
| Russia | 1 | 1 | 0 | 0 | 3 | 1 | +2 | 100.00 |
| Saudi Arabia | 1 | 1 | 0 | 0 | 3 | 1 | +2 | 100.00 |
| South Korea | 1 | 0 | 0 | 1 | 1 | 2 | −1 | 0.00 |
| Soviet Union | 3 | 1 | 2 | 0 | 2 | 1 | +1 | 33.33 |
| Spain | 1 | 0 | 0 | 1 | 1 | 5 | −4 | 0.00 |
| Syria | 1 | 0 | 1 | 0 | 1 | 1 | +0 | 0.00 |
| Togo | 1 | 1 | 0 | 0 | 2 | 0 | +2 | 100.00 |
| Trinidad and Tobago | 1 | 1 | 0 | 0 | 2 | 0 | +2 | 100.00 |
| Turkey | 1 | 0 | 0 | 1 | 1 | 2 | −1 | 0.00 |
| United Arab Emirates | 1 | 0 | 0 | 1 | 0 | 1 | −1 | 0.00 |
| Uruguay | 1 | 1 | 0 | 0 | 2 | 1 | +1 | 100.00 |
| Yugoslavia | 1 | 0 | 0 | 1 | 0 | 4 | −4 | 0.00 |
| Total | **59** | **17** | **15** | **27** | **67** | **95** | **−28** | **28.81** |

=== In AFC U-20 Asian Cup ===
| Opponent | Pld | W | D | L | GF | GA | GD | Win % |
|---|---|---|---|---|---|---|---|---|
| China | 3 | 2 | 0 | 1 | 3 | 2 | +1 | 66.67 |
| Indonesia | 1 | 1 | 0 | 0 | 1 | 0 | +1 | 100.00 |
| Iran | 2 | 2 | 0 | 0 | 6 | 2 | +4 | 100.00 |
| Iraq | 2 | 1 | 0 | 1 | 3 | 4 | −1 | 50.00 |
| Japan | 1 | 1 | 0 | 0 | 2 | 0 | +2 | 100.00 |
| Jordan | 3 | 2 | 1 | 0 | 6 | 2 | +4 | 66.67 |
| Kyrgyzstan | 1 | 1 | 0 | 0 | 5 | 1 | +4 | 100.00 |
| North Korea | 2 | 1 | 0 | 1 | 4 | 4 | +0 | 50.00 |
| Qatar | 3 | 3 | 0 | 0 | 13 | 2 | +11 | 100.00 |
| Saudi Arabia | 4 | 1 | 2 | 1 | 5 | 5 | +0 | 25.00 |
| South Korea | 3 | 0 | 2 | 1 | 2 | 3 | −1 | 0.00 |
| Syria | 1 | 0 | 1 | 0 | 1 | 1 | +0 | 0.00 |
| Tajikistan | 1 | 0 | 1 | 0 | 0 | 0 | +0 | 0.00 |
| Thailand | 2 | 2 | 0 | 0 | 4 | 1 | +3 | 100.00 |
| United Arab Emirates | 4 | 2 | 1 | 1 | 7 | 6 | +1 | 50.00 |
| Uzbekistan | 4 | 0 | 3 | 1 | 5 | 6 | −1 | 0.00 |
| Vietnam | 2 | 1 | 0 | 1 | 2 | 2 | +0 | 50.00 |
| Yemen | 1 | 1 | 0 | 0 | 4 | 1 | +3 | 100.00 |
| Total | **40** | **21** | **11** | **8** | **73** | **42** | **+31** | **52.50** |
