= 1986 OFC U-20 Championship =

Tournament details
- Host country: New Zealand
- Dates: 17–26 October
- Teams: 5

Final positions
- Champions: Australia (4th title)
- Runners-up: Israel
- Third place: New Zealand
- Fourth place: Taiwan

The OFC U-20 Championship 1986 was a soccer tournament held at the Mount Smart Stadium in Auckland, New Zealand. It also served as qualification for the 1987 FIFA World Youth Championship.

== Teams ==
The following teams entered the tournament:

- Australia
- Fiji
- Israel
- New Zealand (host)
- Taiwan

== Standings ==
Pos	Team	Pld	W	D	L	GF	GA	GD	Pts	Qualification
1	Australia	4	3	1	0	16	1	+15	7	Qualification for 1987 FIFA World Youth Championship
2	Israel	4	2	2	0	11	3	+8	6	
3	New Zealand (H)	4	0	3	1	1	4	−3	3	
4	Chinese Taipei	4	0	2	2	4	13	−9	2	
5	Fiji	4	0	2	2	3	14	−11	2	

Source: RSSSF
(H) Hosts

== Matches ==
17 October	Australia	7–0	Fiji
	New Zealand	1–1	Israel
19 October	Fiji	3–3	Taiwan
	Australia	1–1	Israel
21 October	Fiji	0–4	Israel
	New Zealand	0–0	Taiwan
23 October	New Zealand	0–0	Fiji
	Australia	5–0	Taiwan
26 October	Israel	5–1	Taiwan
	New Zealand	0–3	Australia

1986 OFC U-20 Championship

Australia
Fourth title

== Qualification to World Youth Championship ==
The tournament winner qualified for the 1987 FIFA World Youth Championship.

- Australia
