= 1978 OFC U-20 Championship =

Tournament details
- Host country: New Zealand
- Dates: 11–16 November
- Teams: 4

Final positions
- Champions: Australia (1st title)
- Runners-up: Fiji
- Third place: New Zealand
- Fourth place: Papua New Guinea

The 1978 OFC U-20 Championship was a soccer tournament held in New Zealand. As in common with other biennial OFC U-20 Championships it also served as a qualification for an intercontinental play-off. In this case the 1979 FIFA World Youth Championship.

== Teams ==
The following teams entered the tournament:

- Australia
- Fiji
- New Zealand (host)
- Papua New Guinea

== Standings ==
Pos	Team	Pld	W	D	L	GF	GA	GD	Pts	Qualification
1	Australia	3	3	0	0	16	2	+14	6	Advance to Inter-continental qualification
2	Fiji	3	1	1	1	6	6	0	3	
3	New Zealand (H)	3	1	1	1	6	3	+3	3	
4	Papua New Guinea	3	0	0	3	0	17	−17	0	

Source: RSSSF
(H) Hosts

It is unclear why Fiji finished second in this group, with a lesser goal difference than New Zealand.

== Matches ==
11 November	Australia	9–0	Papua New Guinea
	Fiji	1–1	New Zealand
14 November	New Zealand	4–0	Papua New Guinea
	Australia	5–1	Fiji
16 November	Fiji	4–0	Papua New Guinea
	New Zealand	1–2	Australia

1978 OFC U-20 Championship

Australia
First title

== Inter-continental qualification ==
Australia failed to qualify for the 1979 FIFA World Youth Championship. They finished last in an inter-continental qualification group with Paraguay and Israel. Matches were played in Asunción, Paraguay.

Pos	Team	Pld	W	D	L	GF	GA	GD	Pts	Qualification
1	Paraguay	4	4	0	0	10	1	+9	8	Qualification for 1979 FIFA World Youth Championship
2	Israel	4	0	2	2	1	5	−4	2	
3	Australia	4	0	2	2	0	5	−5	2	

Source: RSSSF

7 February	Paraguay	2–0	Australia
9 February	Israel	0–0	Australia
11 February	Paraguay	3–0	Israel
14 February	Australia	0–0	Israel
16 February	Paraguay	3–0	Australia
18 February	Paraguay	2–1	Israel
