= 1982 OFC U-20 Championship =

Tournament details
- Host country: Papua New Guinea
- Dates: 5–12 December
- Teams: 4

Final positions
- Champions: Australia (2nd title)
- Runners-up: New Zealand
- Third place: Fiji
- Fourth place: Papua New Guinea

The 1982 OFC U-20 Championship was held in Papua New Guinea. It also served as a qualifier for the intercontinental play-off for the 1983 FIFA World Youth Championship.

== Teams ==
The following teams entered the tournament:

- Australia
- Fiji
- New Zealand
- Papua New Guinea (host)

== First round ==
| Pos | Team | Pld | W | D | L | GF | GA | GD | Pts | Qualification |
|---|---|---|---|---|---|---|---|---|---|---|
| 1 | Australia | 3 | 3 | 0 | 0 | 11 | 1 | +10 | 6 | Advance to Final |
| 2 | New Zealand | 3 | 2 | 0 | 1 | 13 | 2 | +11 | 4 | Advance to Final |
| 3 | Papua New Guinea (H) | 3 | 0 | 1 | 2 | 1 | 9 | −8 | 1 | Advance to Third place play-off |
| 4 | Fiji | 3 | 0 | 1 | 2 | 1 | 14 | −13 | 1 | Advance to Third place play-off |

Source: RSSSF
(H) Hosts

| Papua New Guinea | 0–6 | New Zealand |
| Australia | 7–0 | Fiji |
| Australia | 2–1 | New Zealand |
| Papua New Guinea | 1–1 | Fiji |
| New Zealand | 6–0 | Fiji |
| Papua New Guinea | 0–2 | Australia |

== Third place match ==
12 December 1982

| Papua New Guinea | 1–2 | Fiji |

Papua New Guinea

== Final ==
12 December 1982

| Australia | 4–3 (a.e.t.) | New Zealand |
|---|---|---|
| Farina 75', 80'; Lowe 92', 98' | | Tuaa 10' (pen.), 21'; McClennan 110'; De Jong (red card) 120' |

Papua New Guinea
Referee: Ian Mole (Papua New Guinea)

1982 OFC U-20 Championship

Australia
Second title

== Qualification to World Youth Championship ==
Australia qualified for the 1983 FIFA World Youth Championship by winning an intercontinental play-off against Israel and Costa Rica. Matches were played in Costa Rica.

| Teams | Pld | W | D | L | GF | GA | GD | Pts |
|---|---|---|---|---|---|---|---|---|
| Australia | 4 | 4 | 0 | 0 | 11 | 3 | +8 | 8 |
| Israel | 4 | 1 | 1 | 2 | 4 | 6 | –2 | 3 |
| Costa Rica | 4 | 0 | 1 | 3 | 1 | 8 | –7 | 1 |

| 26 January | Australia | 3–1 | Israel |
| 28 January | Israel | 2–0 | Costa Rica |
| 30 January | Costa Rica | 1–3 | Australia |
| 1 February | Israel | 1–2 | Australia |
| 3 February | Australia | 3–0 | Costa Rica |
| | Israel | 0–0 | Costa Rica |
