= 2022 UEFA European Under-19 Championship squads =

Player listings in youth football competition

The 2022 UEFA European Under-19 Championship was an international football tournament held in Slovakia from 18 June to 1 July 2022.

Each national team submitted a squad of 20 players, two of whom had to be goalkeepers.

Players in boldface have been capped at full international level since the tournament.

Ages are as of the start of the tournament, 18 June 2022.

== Group A ==
=== Slovakia ===
Head coach: Albert Rusnák

Slovakia named their squad on 12 June 2022.

No.	Pos.	Player	Date of birth (age)	Club
1	GK	Filip Baláž	12 April 2003 (aged 19)	(Slovak Football Association) Dukla Banská Bystrica
12	GK	Adam Hrdina	12 February 2004 (aged 18)	(Slovak Football Association) Slovan Bratislava
2	DF	Nicolas Šikula	15 May 2003 (aged 19)	(Slovak Football Association) Železiarne Podbrezová
3	DF	Jakub Luka	18 August 2003 (aged 18)	(Slovak Football Association) Ružomberok
5	DF	Šimon Mičuda	28 January 2004 (aged 18)	(Slovak Football Association) Trenčín
6	DF	**Sebastian Kóša**	13 September 2003 (aged 18)	(Slovak Football Association) Spartak Trnava
13	DF	Marek Ujlaky	3 December 2003 (aged 18)	(Slovak Football Association) Spartak Trnava
19	DF	Samuel Kopásek	22 May 2003 (aged 19)	(Slovak Football Association) Žilina
7	MF	Dominik Snajder	22 July 2003 (aged 18)	(Slovak Football Association) Žilina
8	MF	Artur Gajdoš	20 January 2004 (aged 18)	(Slovak Football Association) Trenčín
11	MF	Adam Gaži	1 March 2003 (aged 19)	(Slovak Football Association) Trenčín
14	MF	Máté Szolgai	27 July 2003 (aged 18)	(Slovak Football Association) DAK 1904
17	MF	Viktor Sliacky	10 June 2003 (aged 19)	(Slovak Football Association) Petržalka
18	MF	Martin Oravec	11 May 2003 (aged 19)	(Slovak Football Association) Žilina
20	MF	**Mário Sauer**	15 May 2004 (aged 18)	(Slovak Football Association) Žilina
21	MF	Gabriel Halabrín	21 April 2003 (aged 19)	(Slovak Football Association) Senica
22	MF	**Dominik Hollý**	11 November 2003 (aged 18)	(Slovak Football Association) Trenčín
10	FW	Timotej Jambor	4 April 2003 (aged 19)	(Slovak Football Association) Žilina
15	FW	Martin Mišovič	22 January 2004 (aged 18)	(Slovak Football Association) Slovan Bratislava
16	FW	Adam Griger	16 March 2004 (aged 18)	(Austrian Football Association) LASK

=== Romania ===
Head coach: Adrian Văsâi

Romania named their squad on 15 June 2022.

No.	Pos.	Player	Date of birth (age)	Club
1	GK	Robert Popa	5 March 2003 (aged 19)	(Romanian Football Federation) FC U Craiova 1948
12	GK	Alexandru Borbei	27 June 2003 (aged 18)	(Italian Football Federation) Lecce
2	DF	**Alexandru Pantea**	11 September 2003 (aged 18)	(Romanian Football Federation) Hermannstadt
3	DF	Gabriel Dănuleasa	8 May 2003 (aged 19)	(Romanian Football Federation) Farul Constanța
4	DF	Botond Gergely	11 January 2003 (aged 19)	(Romanian Football Federation) FK Miercurea Ciuc
5	DF	Sergiu Pîrvulescu	21 July 2003 (aged 18)	(Romanian Football Federation) Petrolul Ploiești
6	DF	Dan Sîrbu	22 April 2003 (aged 19)	(Romanian Football Federation) Farul Constanța
14	DF	Andrei Coubiș	29 September 2003 (aged 18)	(Italian Football Federation) Milan
7	MF	Eduard Rădăslăvescu	30 July 2004 (aged 17)	(Romanian Football Federation) Farul Constanța
8	MF	Andrei Pandele	9 July 2003 (aged 18)	(Romanian Football Federation) Metaloglobus București
10	MF	Rareș Ilie	19 April 2003 (aged 19)	(Romanian Football Federation) Rapid București
11	MF	Ștefan Bodișteanu	1 February 2003 (aged 19)	(Romanian Football Federation) Farul Constanța
16	MF	Denis Radu	25 March 2003 (aged 19)	(Romanian Football Federation) SSU Politehnica Timișoara
17	MF	Răzvan Tănasă	28 April 2003 (aged 19)	(Romanian Football Federation) Farul Constanța
19	MF	Aurelian Ciuciulete	4 April 2003 (aged 19)	(Romanian Football Federation) Unirea Constanța
20	MF	Nicolas Popescu	2 January 2003 (aged 19)	(Romanian Football Federation) Farul Constanța
21	MF	Doru Andrei	3 February 2003 (aged 19)	(Romanian Football Federation) Politehnica Timișoara
9	FW	Andreas Chirițoiu	26 October 2003 (aged 18)	(Romanian Football Federation) Unirea Constanța
18	FW	**Enes Sali**	23 February 2006 (aged 16)	(Romanian Football Federation) Farul Constanța
22	FW	Luca Andronache	26 July 2003 (aged 18)	(Romanian Football Federation) Farul Constanța

=== Italy ===
Head coach: Carmine Nunziata

Italy named their squad on 16 June 2022. Giorgio Scalvini and Wilfried Gnonto were originally included in the list, but their submissions were eventually denied by their respective clubs.

No.	Pos.	Player	Date of birth (age)	Club
1	GK	Sebastiano Desplanches	11 March 2003 (aged 19)	(Italian Football Federation) Milan
12	GK	Gioele Zacchi	10 July 2003 (aged 18)	(Italian Football Federation) Sassuolo
2	DF	Riccardo Stivanello	24 April 2004 (aged 18)	(Italian Football Federation) Bologna
3	DF	Riccardo Turicchia	5 February 2003 (aged 19)	(Italian Football Federation) Juventus
4	DF	**Diego Coppola**	28 December 2003 (aged 18)	(Italian Football Federation) Hellas Verona
5	DF	Daniele Ghilardi	6 January 2003 (aged 19)	(Italian Football Federation) Hellas Verona
13	DF	Filippo Terracciano	8 February 2003 (aged 19)	(Italian Football Federation) Hellas Verona
15	DF	Alessandro Fontanarosa	7 February 2003 (aged 19)	(Italian Football Federation) Internazionale
17	DF	Gabriele Mulazzi	1 April 2003 (aged 19)	(Italian Football Federation) Juventus
6	MF	Samuel Giovane (captain)	28 March 2003 (aged 19)	(Italian Football Federation) Atalanta
7	MF	Giovanni Fabbian	14 January 2003 (aged 19)	(Italian Football Federation) Internazionale
8	MF	Cesare Casadei	10 January 2003 (aged 19)	(Italian Football Federation) Internazionale
10	MF	**Fabio Miretti**	3 August 2003 (aged 18)	(Italian Football Federation) Juventus
16	MF	**Giacomo Faticanti**	31 July 2004 (aged 17)	(Italian Football Federation) Roma
19	MF	Jacopo Fazzini	16 March 2003 (aged 19)	(Italian Football Federation) Empoli
21	MF	Duccio Degli Innocenti	28 April 2003 (aged 19)	(Italian Football Federation) Empoli
9	FW	Giuseppe Ambrosino	10 September 2003 (aged 18)	(Italian Football Federation) Napoli
11	FW	Marco Nasti	17 September 2003 (aged 18)	(Italian Football Federation) Milan
18	FW	Tommaso Baldanzi	23 March 2003 (aged 19)	(Italian Football Federation) Empoli
23	FW	**Cristian Volpato**	15 November 2003 (aged 18)	(Italian Football Federation) Roma

=== France ===
Head coach: Landry Chauvin

France named their squad on 12 June 2022.

No.	Pos.	Player	Date of birth (age)	Club
1	GK	Thimothée Lo-Tutala	13 February 2003 (aged 19)	(The Football Association) Hull City
16	GK	Yann Lienard	16 March 2003 (aged 19)	(French Football Federation) Monaco
2	DF	Tanguy Zoukrou	7 May 2003 (aged 19)	(French Football Federation) Troyes
3	DF	**Jaouen Hadjam**	26 March 2003 (aged 19)	(French Football Federation) Paris FC
4	DF	Ismaël Doukouré	24 July 2003 (aged 18)	(French Football Federation) Strasbourg
5	DF	Isaak Touré	28 March 2003 (aged 19)	(French Football Federation) Le Havre
18	DF	**Jordan Semedo**	15 January 2003 (aged 19)	(French Football Federation) Monaco
19	DF	Brayann Pereira	21 May 2003 (aged 19)	(French Football Federation) Lens
20	DF	**Ousmane Camara**	6 March 2003 (aged 19)	(French Football Federation) Paris FC
6	MF	Martin Adeline	2 December 2003 (aged 18)	(French Football Federation) Reims
8	MF	Warren Bondo	15 September 2003 (aged 18)	(French Football Federation) Nancy
14	MF	Andy Diouf	17 May 2003 (aged 19)	(French Football Federation) Rennes
15	MF	Florent Sanchez Da Silva	2 April 2003 (aged 19)	(French Football Federation) Villefranche
17	MF	Abdoullah Ba	31 July 2003 (aged 18)	(French Football Federation) Le Havre
7	FW	Alan Virginius	3 January 2003 (aged 19)	(French Football Federation) Sochaux
9	FW	Salim Ben Seghir	24 February 2003 (aged 19)	(French Football Federation) Marseille
10	FW	Loum Tchaouna	8 September 2003 (aged 18)	(French Football Federation) Rennes
11	FW	Lamine Cissé	15 February 2003 (aged 19)	(French Football Federation) Nancy
12	FW	**Taïryk Arconte**	12 November 2003 (aged 18)	(French Football Federation) Ajaccio
13	FW	**Ange-Yoan Bonny**	25 October 2003 (aged 18)	(Italian Football Federation) Parma

== Group B ==
=== England ===
Head coach: Ian Foster

England named their squad on 17 June 2022.

No.	Pos.	Player	Date of birth (age)	Club
1	GK	Matthew Cox	2 May 2003 (aged 19)	(The Football Association) Brentford
21	GK	Harvey Davies	3 September 2003 (aged 18)	(The Football Association) Liverpool
13	GK	Teddy Sharman-Lowe	30 March 2003 (aged 19)	(The Football Association) Chelsea
2	DF	Brooke Norton-Cuffy	12 January 2004 (aged 18)	(The Football Association) Arsenal
3	DF	Callum Doyle	3 October 2003 (aged 18)	(The Football Association) Manchester City
5	DF	Ronnie Edwards	28 March 2003 (aged 19)	(The Football Association) Peterborough United
6	DF	**Jarell Quansah**	29 January 2003 (aged 19)	(The Football Association) Liverpool
12	DF	Daniel Oyegoke	3 January 2003 (aged 19)	(The Football Association) Brentford
15	DF	Luke Chambers	24 June 2004 (aged 17)	(The Football Association) Liverpool
16	DF	Bashir Humphreys	15 March 2003 (aged 19)	(The Football Association) Chelsea
4	MF	Tim Iroegbunam	30 June 2003 (aged 18)	(The Football Association) Aston Villa
7	MF	Alfie Devine	1 August 2004 (aged 17)	(The Football Association) Tottenham Hotspur
8	MF	**Carney Chukwuemeka**	20 October 2003 (aged 18)	(The Football Association) Aston Villa
10	MF	Aaron Ramsey	21 January 2003 (aged 19)	(The Football Association) Aston Villa
11	MF	**Harvey Vale** (captain)	11 September 2003 (aged 18)	(The Football Association) Chelsea
14	MF	Alex Scott	21 August 2003 (aged 18)	(The Football Association) Bristol City
17	MF	Samuel Iling-Junior	4 October 2003 (aged 18)	(Italian Football Federation) Juventus
18	MF	Jamie Bynoe-Gittens	8 August 2004 (aged 17)	(German Football Association) Borussia Dortmund
9	FW	Dane Scarlett	24 March 2004 (aged 18)	(The Football Association) Tottenham Hotspur
19	FW	Liam Delap	8 February 2003 (aged 19)	(The Football Association) Manchester City
20	FW	**Daniel Jebbison**	13 August 2003 (aged 18)	(The Football Association) Sheffield United

=== Israel ===
Head coach: Ofir Haim

Israel named their squad on 13 June 2022.

No.	Pos.	Player	Date of birth (age)	Caps	Goals	Club
1	GK	Lior Gliklich	2 January 2003 (aged 19)	10	0	(Israel Football Association) Hapoel Tel Aviv
18	GK	Tomer Tzarfati	16 October 2003 (aged 18)	5	0	(Israel Football Association) Maccabi Netanya
2	DF	Ilay Tomer	8 April 2004 (aged 18)	18	0	(Israel Football Association) Maccabi Tel Aviv
3	DF	Or Israelov	2 September 2004 (aged 17)	14	0	(Israel Football Association) Hapoel Tel Aviv
4	DF	**Stav Lemkin**	2 April 2003 (aged 19)	15	1	(Israel Football Association) Hapoel Tel Aviv
5	DF	Shon Edri	24 October 2003 (aged 18)	19	1	(Israel Football Association) Maccabi Tel Aviv
12	DF	**Roy Revivo**	22 May 2003 (aged 19)	19	1	(Israel Football Association) Maccabi Tel Aviv
13	DF	Ilay Feingold	23 August 2004 (aged 17)	9	0	(Israel Football Association) Maccabi Haifa
6	MF	El Yam Kancepolsky	22 December 2003 (aged 18)	16	1	(Israel Football Association) Hapoel Tel Aviv
8	MF	Ilay Madmon (captain)	23 February 2003 (aged 19)	13	1	(Israel Football Association) Hapoel Be'er Sheva
10	MF	**Oscar Gloukh**	1 April 2004 (aged 18)	15	3	(Israel Football Association) Maccabi Tel Aviv
14	MF	Roy Navi	4 March 2004 (aged 18)	6	0	(Israel Football Association) Maccabi Tel Aviv
15	MF	Tai Abed	3 August 2004 (aged 17)	9	4	(Royal Dutch Football Association) PSV Eindhoven
16	MF	Noam Muche	30 July 2003 (aged 18)	17	1	(Israel Football Association) MS Ashdod
7	FW	Nehorai Ifrah	7 May 2003 (aged 19)	7	1	(Israel Football Association) Maccabi Haifa
9	FW	**Dor Turgeman**	24 October 2003 (aged 18)	16	5	(Israel Football Association) Maccabi Tel Aviv
11	FW	Ariel Lugasi	24 November 2004 (aged 17)	19	3	(Israel Football Association) Maccabi Petah Tikva
17	FW	Orel Baye	2 March 2004 (aged 18)	4	1	(Israel Football Association) Maccabi Tel Aviv
19	FW	Idan Gorno	9 August 2004 (aged 17)	13	0	(Israel Football Association) Maccabi Petah Tikva
20	FW	Ahmed Salman	22 March 2004 (aged 18)	17	2	(Israel Football Association) Hapoel Jerusalem

=== Serbia ===
Head coach: Aleksandar Jović

Serbia named their squad on 15 June 2022.

No.	Pos.	Player	Date of birth (age)	Club
1	GK	Ognjen Lukić	4 July 2003 (aged 18)	(Football Association of Serbia) Radnički 1923
12	GK	Marko Ćopić	14 July 2003 (aged 18)	(Football Association of Serbia) Radnički Sombor
2	DF	Uroš Lazić	15 March 2003 (aged 19)	(Football Association of Serbia) Grafičar Beograd
3	DF	Nemanja Krsmanović	9 May 2003 (aged 19)	(Football Association of Serbia) TSC Bačka Topola
5	DF	Stefan Leković	9 January 2004 (aged 18)	(Football Association of Serbia) Grafičar Beograd
6	DF	Andrej Đurić	21 September 2003 (aged 18)	(Football Association of Serbia) Red Star Belgrade
15	DF	Mihajlo Ilić	4 June 2003 (aged 19)	(Football Association of Serbia) Partizan
16	DF	Bojan Kovačević	22 May 2004 (aged 18)	(Football Association of Serbia) Čukarički
4	MF	Nikola Petković	23 February 2003 (aged 19)	(Football Association of Serbia) BASK
7	MF	Nikola Knežević	10 March 2003 (aged 19)	(Football Association of Serbia) Grafičar Beograd
8	MF	Nikola Stanković	24 April 2003 (aged 19)	(Football Association of Serbia) Red Star Belgrade
14	MF	Vladimir Miletić	5 March 2003 (aged 19)	(Football Association of Serbia) Vojvodina
17	MF	Đorđe Gordić	5 November 2004 (aged 17)	(Football Association of Serbia) Mladost Lučani
20	MF	Dario Grgić	16 March 2003 (aged 19)	(Football Association of Serbia) Železničar Pančevo
22	MF	Igor Miladinović	8 June 2003 (aged 19)	(Football Association of Serbia) Čukarički
9	FW	Marko Lazetić	22 January 2004 (aged 18)	(Italian Football Federation) AC Milan
10	FW	Nemanja Motika	20 March 2003 (aged 19)	(Football Association of Serbia) Red Star Belgrade
11	FW	Ognjen Ajdar	5 April 2003 (aged 19)	(Football Association of Serbia) BASK
19	FW	Nikola Jojić	15 September 2003 (aged 18)	(Football Association of Serbia) Mladost Lučani
21	FW	**Petar Ratkov**	18 August 2003 (aged 18)	(Football Association of Serbia) TSC Bačka Topola

=== Austria ===
Head coach: Martin Scherb

Austria named their squad on 16 June 2022. Muharem Husković left the squad due to an injury and was subsequently replaced by Dominik Weixlbraun.

No.	Pos.	Player	Date of birth (age)	Club
1	GK	Elias Scherf	11 May 2003 (aged 19)	(Austrian Football Association) Lafnitz
21	GK	Patrick Moser	20 January 2003 (aged 19)	(Austrian Football Association) Ried
3	DF	Samuel Mischitz	14 August 2003 (aged 18)	(Austrian Football Association) Altach
4	DF	Leonardo Ivkic	30 January 2003 (aged 19)	(Austrian Football Association) Austria Wien
5	DF	Lukas Wallner	26 April 2003 (aged 19)	(Austrian Football Association) Liefering
13	DF	Justin Omoregie	21 September 2003 (aged 18)	(Austrian Football Association) Liefering
14	DF	**Leopold Querfeld**	20 December 2003 (aged 18)	(Austrian Football Association) Rapid Wien
15	DF	Nico Wiesinger	20 February 2003 (aged 19)	(Austrian Football Association) Ried
17	DF	Pascal Fallmann	7 November 2003 (aged 18)	(Austrian Football Association) Rapid Wien
6	MF	Ervin Omić	20 January 2003 (aged 19)	(Italian Football Federation) Juventus
7	MF	Dominik Weixelbraun	17 December 2003 (aged 18)	(Austrian Football Association) Juniors OÖ
8	MF	Adis Jasic	12 February 2003 (aged 19)	(Austrian Football Association) Wolfsberger AC
10	MF	**Yusuf Demir**	2 June 2003 (aged 19)	(Austrian Football Association) Rapid Wien
16	MF	Florian Wustinger	21 July 2003 (aged 18)	(Austrian Football Association) Austria Wien
18	MF	Benjamin Kanuric	26 February 2003 (aged 19)	(Austrian Football Association) Rapid Wien
19	MF	Sandro Schendl	19 March 2003 (aged 19)	(Austrian Football Association) Sturm Graz
20	MF	Onurhan Babuscu	5 September 2003 (aged 18)	(Austrian Football Association) Admira Wacker
22	MF	Nikolas Veratschnig	24 January 2003 (aged 19)	(Austrian Football Association) Wolfsberger AC
9	FW	Justin Forst	21 February 2003 (aged 19)	(Austrian Football Association) WSG Tirol
11	FW	Jakob Knollmüller	26 July 2003 (aged 18)	(German Football Association) TSG Hoffenheim
