= Dermitzakis =

Dermitzakis is a surname. Notable people with the surname include:

- Emmanouil Dermitzakis (born 1972), Greek geneticist
- Giannis Dermitzakis (born 1992), Greek footballer
- Konstantinos Dermitzakis (born 1982), Greek footballer
- Manolis Dermitzakis (born 1976), Greek footballer
- Pavlos Dermitzakis (born 1969), Greek footballer
