= 1998 UEFA European Under-21 Championship squads =

Football team member listings

The following is a list of squads for each nation competing at 1998 UEFA European Under-21 Championship in Romania. The tournament started on 23 May and the final took place in Bucharest on 31 May 1998.

Players born on or after 1 January 1975 were eligible to play in the tournament. Each nation had to submit a squad of 20 players, two of which had to be goalkeepers. If a player was injured seriously enough to prevent his taking part in the tournament before his team's first match, he could be replaced by another player.

Players in bold have later been capped at full international level.

== Germany ==
Coach: Hannes Löhr

No.	Pos.	Player	Date of birth (age)	Caps	Club
1	GK	Simon Jentzsch	4 May 1976 (aged 22)		(Germany) Karlsruher SC
2	DF	Marcell Fensch	23 August 1975 (aged 22)		(Germany) 1. FC Köln
3	DF	Markus Reiter	10 August 1976 (aged 21)		(Germany) MSV Duisburg
4	DF	**Mustafa Doğan**	1 January 1976 (aged 22)		(Turkey) Fenerbahçe
5	DF	**Frank Baumann**	29 October 1975 (aged 22)		(Germany) 1. FC Nürnberg
6	DF	Thomas Cichon	9 July 1976 (aged 21)		(Germany) 1. FC Köln
7	DF	Uwe Ehlers	8 March 1975 (aged 23)		(Germany) Hansa Rostock
8	MF	**Michael Ballack**	26 September 1976 (aged 21)		(Germany) 1. FC Kaiserslautern
9	FW	Markus Schroth	25 January 1975 (aged 23)		(Germany) Karlsruher SC
10	MF	Andreas Neuendorf	9 February 1975 (aged 23)		(Germany) Hertha BSC
11	MF	Kai Michalke	5 April 1976 (aged 22)		(Germany) VfL Bochum
12	GK	Christian Fiedler	27 March 1975 (aged 23)		(Germany) Hertha BSC
13	DF	Michael Bochtler	15 October 1975 (aged 22)		(Austria) Sturm Graz
14	MF	**Lars Ricken** (c)	10 July 1976 (aged 21)		(Germany) Borussia Dortmund
15	FW	**Thomas Brdarić**	23 January 1975 (aged 23)		(Germany) Fortuna Köln
16	DF	Lars Müller	22 March 1976 (aged 22)		(Germany) KFC Uerdingen 05
17	MF	**Torsten Frings**	22 November 1976 (aged 21)		(Germany) Werder Bremen
18	MF	Frank Gerster	15 April 1976 (aged 22)		(Germany) Bayern Munich
19	MF	Danny Schwarz	11 May 1975 (aged 23)		(Germany) VfB Stuttgart
20	MF	Christian Fährmann	5 October 1975 (aged 22)		(Germany) Hertha BSC

== Greece ==
Coach: Ioannis Kollias

No.	Pos.	Player	Date of birth (age)	Caps	Club
1	GK	**Dimitrios Eleftheropoulos**	7 August 1976 (aged 21)		(Greece) Olympiacos
2	MF	**Vasilios Lakis**	10 September 1976 (aged 21)		(Greece) Paniliakos
3	MF	**Pantelis Konstantinidis**	16 August 1975 (aged 22)		(Greece) Apollon Smyrnis
4	DF	**Giannis Goumas**	24 May 1975 (aged 22)		(Greece) Panathinaikos
5	DF	**Paraskevas Antzas**	18 August 1977 (aged 20)		(Greece) Skoda Xanthi
6	DF	**Traianos Dellas**	31 January 1976 (aged 22)		(England) Sheffield United
7	MF	**Giorgos Karagounis** (c)	6 March 1977 (aged 21)		(Greece) Apollon Smyrnis
8	DF	**Athanasios Kostoulas**	24 March 1976 (aged 22)		(Greece) Kalamata
9	FW	**Sotiris Konstantinidis**	19 April 1977 (aged 21)		(Greece) Iraklis
10	FW	**Nikos Liberopoulos**	4 August 1975 (aged 22)		(Greece) Panathinaikos
11	MF	**Ieroklis Stoltidis**	2 February 1975 (aged 23)		(Greece) Iraklis
12	DF	Georgios Koulakiotis	5 May 1977 (aged 21)		(Greece) PAOK
13	MF	Giorgos Koltzos	13 September 1976 (aged 21)		(Greece) Athinaikos
14	DF	**Dimitris Mavrogenidis**	23 December 1976 (aged 21)		(Greece) Olympiacos
15	GK	Sotiris Liberopoulos	29 June 1977 (aged 20)		(Greece) Ethnikos Piraeus
16	DF	**Georgios Alexopoulos**	7 February 1977 (aged 21)		(Greece) Panathinaikos
17	MF	**Angelos Basinas**	3 January 1976 (aged 22)		(Greece) Panathinaikos
18	MF	Stelios Sfakianakis	19 March 1976 (aged 22)		(Greece) Olympiacos
19	FW	Stavros Labriakos	30 November 1975 (aged 22)		(Greece) Apollon Smyrnis
20	FW	**Manolis Dermitzakis**	24 November 1976 (aged 21)		(Greece) OFI Crete

== Netherlands ==
Coach: Hans Dorjee

No.	Pos.	Player	Date of birth (age)	Caps	Club
1	GK	Jim van Fessem	7 August 1975 (aged 22)		(Netherlands) Willem II
2	MF	**George Boateng**	5 September 1975 (aged 22)		(Netherlands) Feyenoord
3	DF	Jürgen Dirkx	15 August 1975 (aged 22)		(Netherlands) Fortuna Sittard
4	DF	**Mario Melchiot**	4 November 1976 (aged 21)		(Netherlands) Ajax
5	DF	**Patrick Paauwe**	27 December 1975 (aged 22)		(Netherlands) Fortuna Sittard
6	MF	Robert Fuchs	15 February 1975 (aged 23)		(Netherlands) De Graafschap
7	MF	Nordin Wooter	24 August 1976 (aged 21)		(Spain) Real Zaragoza
8	FW	**Arnold Bruggink**	24 July 1977 (aged 20)		(Netherlands) PSV
9	FW	**Roy Makaay** (c)	9 March 1975 (aged 23)		(Spain) Tenerife
10	MF	**Martijn Reuser**	1 February 1975 (aged 23)		(Netherlands) Vitesse
11	MF	Kiki Musampa	20 July 1977 (aged 20)		(France) Bordeaux
12	MF	**Niels Oude Kamphuis**	14 November 1977 (aged 20)		(Netherlands) Twente
13	DF	Tieme Klompe	8 April 1976 (aged 22)		(Netherlands) Heerenveen
14	MF	John de Jong	8 March 1977 (aged 21)		(Netherlands) Utrecht
15	MF	Menno Willems	10 March 1977 (aged 21)		(Netherlands) Vitesse
16	FW	**Ruud van Nistelrooy**	1 July 1976 (aged 21)		(Netherlands) Heerenveen
17	DF	**Fernando Ricksen**	27 July 1976 (aged 21)		(Netherlands) Fortuna Sittard
18	GK	Stefan Postma	6 October 1976 (aged 21)		(Netherlands) Utrecht
19	DF	Jochem van der Hoeven	5 October 1975 (aged 22)		(Netherlands) Vitesse
20	MF	**Mark van Bommel**	22 April 1977 (aged 21)		(Netherlands) Fortuna Sittard

== Norway ==
Coach: Nils Johan Semb

No.	Pos.	Player	Date of birth (age)	Caps	Club
1	GK	**Espen Baardsen**	7 December 1977 (aged 20)		(England) Tottenham Hotspur
2	MF	**Trond Andersen**	6 January 1975 (aged 23)		(Norway) Molde
3	DF	**Steinar Pedersen**	6 June 1975 (aged 22)		(Germany) Borussia Dortmund
4	DF	**Frode Kippe**	17 January 1978 (aged 20)		(Norway) Lillestrøm
5	DF	**Hai Ngoc Tran**	10 January 1975 (aged 23)		(Norway) Vålerenga
6	MF	**Eirik Bakke**	13 September 1977 (aged 20)		(Norway) Sogndal
7	MF	**Karl Oskar Fjørtoft**	26 July 1975 (aged 22)		(Norway) Molde
8	MF	**Daniel Berg Hestad** (c)	30 July 1975 (aged 22)		(Norway) Molde
9	DF	**Vegard Heggem**	13 July 1975 (aged 22)		(Norway) Rosenborg
10	FW	**Steffen Iversen**	10 November 1976 (aged 21)		(England) Tottenham Hotspur
11	FW	**Thorstein Helstad**	28 April 1977 (aged 21)		(Norway) Brann
12	GK	**Terje Skjeldestad**	18 January 1978 (aged 20)		(Norway) Sogndal
13	MF	**Bjarte Lunde Aarsheim**	14 January 1975 (aged 23)		(Norway) Viking
14	DF	Knut Henry Haraldsen	14 December 1976 (aged 21)		(Norway) Vålerenga
15	MF	Rune Hagen	20 July 1975 (aged 22)		(Norway) Strømsgodset
16	DF	Tommy Stenersen	23 November 1976 (aged 21)		(Norway) Stabæk
17	FW	**Andreas Lund**	7 May 1975 (aged 23)		(Norway) Start
18	FW	**Erik Nevland**	10 November 1977 (aged 20)		(Norway) Viking
19	DF	Odd Arne Espevoll	5 June 1976 (aged 21)		(Norway) Viking
20	DF	**Jon Inge Høiland**	20 September 1977 (aged 20)		(Norway) Kongsvinger

== Romania ==
Coach: Victor Pițurcă

No.	Pos.	Player	Date of birth (age)	Caps	Club
1	GK	**Bogdan Lobonț**	18 January 1978 (aged 20)		(Romania) Rapid București
2	DF	**Cosmin Contra**	15 December 1975 (aged 22)		(Romania) Dinamo București
3	DF	**Iulian Miu**	21 January 1976 (aged 22)		(Romania) Steaua București
4	DF	**Adrian Iencsi**	15 March 1975 (aged 23)		(Romania) Rapid București
5	DF	**Erik Lincar**	16 October 1978 (aged 19)		(Romania) Steaua București
6	MF	**Mihai Tararache**	25 October 1977 (aged 20)		(Romania) Dinamo București
7	MF	**Florentin Petre**	15 January 1976 (aged 22)		(Romania) Dinamo București
8	MF	**Cătălin Hîldan**	3 February 1976 (aged 22)		(Romania) Dinamo București
9	FW	**Ionel Dănciulescu**	6 December 1976 (aged 21)		(Romania) Steaua București
10	MF	**Ionuț Luțu** (c)	3 August 1975 (aged 22)		(Romania) Universitatea Craiova
11	DF	Cornel Frăsineanu	20 August 1976 (aged 21)		(Romania) Universitatea Craiova
12	GK	Tiberiu Lung	24 December 1978 (aged 19)		(Romania) Universitatea Craiova
13	MF	**Eugen Trică**	5 August 1976 (aged 21)		(Romania) Universitatea Craiova
14	MF	Cătălin Liță	23 March 1975 (aged 23)		(Romania) Național București
15	MF	**Cătălin Munteanu**	26 January 1979 (aged 19)		(Romania) Steaua București
16	MF	**Laurențiu Reghecampf**	19 September 1975 (aged 22)		(Romania) Steaua București
17	MF	Robert Vancea	28 September 1976 (aged 21)		(Romania) Universitatea Craiova
18	FW	**Adrian Mihalcea**	24 May 1976 (aged 21)		(Romania) Dinamo București
19	DF	Marius Iordache	8 October 1978 (aged 19)		(Romania) Universitatea Craiova
20	FW	Cristian Ciocoiu	23 November 1975 (aged 22)		(Romania) Steaua București

== Russia ==
Coach: Mikhail Gershkovich

No.	Pos.	Player	Date of birth (age)	Caps	Club
1	GK	Mikhail Kharin	17 June 1976 (aged 21)		(Russia) Torpedo Moscow
2	DF	Dmitri Davydov	22 January 1975 (aged 23)		(Russia) Zenit Saint Petersburg
3	DF	**Vadim Evseev**	8 January 1976 (aged 22)		(Russia) Spartak Moscow
4	FW	Dmitri Shoukov	26 September 1975 (aged 22)		(Netherlands) Vitesse
5	MF	Aleksandr Berketov	24 December 1975 (aged 22)		(Russia) Rotor Volgograd
6	DF	Yevgeni Korablyov	29 October 1978 (aged 19)		(Russia) FC Dynamo Moscow
7	MF	**Vladimir But**	7 September 1977 (aged 20)		(Germany) Borussia Dortmund
8	MF	**Aleksei Bakharev**	12 October 1976 (aged 21)		(Russia) Rotor Volgograd
9	MF	**Yegor Titov**	29 May 1976 (aged 21)		(Russia) Spartak Moscow
10	DF	**Andrei Solomatin** (c)	9 September 1975 (aged 22)		(Russia) Lokomotiv Moscow
11	FW	**Maksim Buznikin**	1 March 1977 (aged 21)		(Russia) Spartak Moscow
12	GK	Sergey Armishev	29 April 1976 (aged 22)		(Russia) Uralan Elista
13	MF	Mikhail Osinov	8 October 1975 (aged 22)		(Israel) Maccabi Tel Aviv
14	MF	Andrei Krivov	24 September 1976 (aged 21)		(Russia) Rotor Volgograd
15	MF	Konstantin Golovskoy	25 April 1975 (aged 23)		(Russia) Spartak Moscow
16	MF	**Denis Laktionov**	4 September 1977 (aged 20)		(South Korea) Suwon Samsung Bluewings
17	FW	Erik Korchagin	16 January 1979 (aged 19)		(France) Saint-Étienne
18	DF	**Dmitri Sennikov**	24 June 1976 (aged 21)		(Russia) CSKA Moscow
19	DF	Sergei Temryukov	1 August 1978 (aged 19)		(Netherlands) PSV
20	DF	**Oleg Kornaukhov**	14 January 1975 (aged 23)		(Russia) CSKA Moscow

== Spain ==
Coach: Iñaki Sáez

No.	Pos.	Player	Date of birth (age)	Caps	Club
1	GK	Francesc Arnau	23 May 1975 (aged 23)		(Spain) Barcelona
2	DF	**Míchel Salgado**	22 October 1975 (aged 22)		(Spain) Celta Vigo
3	DF	**Aitor López Rekarte**	18 August 1975 (aged 22)		(Spain) Real Sociedad
4	DF	**José García Calvo**	1 April 1975 (aged 23)		(Spain) Real Valladolid
5	DF	Sergio Ballesteros	4 September 1975 (aged 22)		(Spain) Tenerife
6	MF	**Ito**	21 January 1975 (aged 23)		(Spain) Celta Vigo
7	MF	**Víctor Sánchez**	23 February 1976 (aged 22)		(Spain) Real Madrid
8	MF	Josico	6 January 1975 (aged 23)		(Spain) Albacete
9	MF	**Marcos Vales** (c)	5 April 1975 (aged 23)		(Spain) Real Zaragoza
10	MF	**Guti**	31 October 1976 (aged 21)		(Spain) Real Madrid
11	FW	Iván Pérez	29 January 1976 (aged 22)		(Spain) Betis
12	DF	José Félix Guerrero	23 August 1975 (aged 22)		(Spain) Racing Santander
13	GK	Esteban	27 June 1975 (aged 22)		(Spain) Real Oviedo
14	MF	Roger	15 December 1976 (aged 21)		(Spain) Barcelona
15	MF	Felipe Guréndez	18 November 1975 (aged 22)		(Spain) Osasuna
16	MF	**Juan Carlos Valerón**	17 June 1975 (aged 22)		(Spain) Mallorca
17	FW	**Miguel Ángel Angulo**	23 June 1977 (aged 20)		(Spain) Valencia
18	MF	Benjamín Zarandona	2 March 1976 (aged 22)		(Spain) Real Valladolid
19	FW	**Salva Ballesta**	22 May 1975 (aged 23)		(Spain) Sevilla
20	DF	Luis Cuartero	17 August 1975 (aged 22)		(Spain) Real Zaragoza

== Sweden ==
Coach: Lars-Olof Mattsson

No.	Pos.	Player	Date of birth (age)	Caps	Club
1	GK	**Eddie Gustafsson**	31 January 1977 (aged 21)		(Sweden) IFK Norrköping
2	DF	**Karl Corneliusson**	17 November 1976 (aged 21)		(Sweden) Örgryte IS
3	DF	**Tommy Jönsson**	4 March 1976 (aged 22)		(Sweden) Malmö FF
4	DF	Filip Bergman	13 March 1979 (aged 19)		(Sweden) Hammarby IF
5	DF	**Olof Mellberg**	3 September 1977 (aged 20)		(Sweden) AIK
6	DF	**Klebér Saarenpää**	14 December 1975 (aged 22)		(Sweden) IFK Norrköping
7	MF	**Joakim Persson**	3 April 1975 (aged 23)		(Sweden) IFK Göteborg
8	MF	**Daniel Andersson** (c)	28 August 1977 (aged 20)		(Sweden) Malmö FF
9	MF	**Freddie Ljungberg**	16 April 1977 (aged 21)		(Sweden) Halmstads BK
10	MF	**Martin Åslund**	10 November 1976 (aged 21)		(Sweden) IFK Norrköping
11	FW	**Yksel Osmanovski**	24 February 1977 (aged 21)		(Sweden) Malmö FF
12	GK	Anders Holmberg	3 February 1976 (aged 22)		(Sweden) Örgryte IS
13	DF	**Markus Johannesson**	29 May 1975 (aged 22)		(Sweden) Örgryte IS
14	DF	**Erik Edman**	11 November 1978 (aged 19)		(Sweden) Helsingborgs IF
15	FW	Ola Johansson	28 March 1975 (aged 23)		(Sweden) Västra Frölunda IF
16	FW	**Jörgen Pettersson**	29 September 1975 (aged 22)		(Germany) Borussia Mönchengladbach
17	MF	Erik Johansson	18 May 1976 (aged 22)		(Sweden) Örgryte IS
18	MF	**Anders Svensson**	17 July 1976 (aged 21)		(Sweden) Elfsborg
19	FW	Stefan Bärlin	31 May 1976 (aged 21)		(Sweden) IFK Göteborg
20	DF	**Alexander Östlund**	2 November 1978 (aged 19)		(Sweden) AIK
