= FC U Craiova 1948 =

FC U Craiova
- Full name: FCU 1948 Craiova Fotbal Club SA
- Nicknames: Alb-albaștrii (The White-Blues); Studenții (The Students); Juveții (The Oltenia People); Leii din Bănie (The Craiova Lions); Dragostea Dintâi (The First Love)
- Short name: FCU
- Founded: 1991; 35 years ago as FC Universitatea Craiova; 2013; 13 years ago as FC U Craiova; 2017; 9 years ago as U Craiova 1948
- Ground: FCU Football Park
- Owner: Adrian Mititelu
- Manager: Ștefan Stoica
- League: Liga IV
- 2025–26: Liga III, 12th of 12 (excluded)
- Website: fcuniversitatea.ro
Home colours	Away colours

FCU 1948 Craiova Fotbal Club, commonly known as FC U Craiova 1948 or simply FC U Craiova, is a Romanian professional football club based in Craiova, Dolj County which competes in Liga IV, the fourth tier in Romanian league.

FC U Craiova was—along with CS Universitatea Craiova—one of the two entities asserting the history of the original Universitatea Craiova football team, which between 1948 and 1991 won four national titles and five national cups. During the latter year, the sports club dissolved its football department and FC Universitatea Craiova took its berth in the top flight. Generally considered the same entity with the old club, FC U continued its tradition for the next two decades, but was reorganised several times and retroactively deemed an unofficial successor. In 2012, it retired from every competition following their temporary banishment since 2011.

After starting over from the lower leagues, FC U Craiova returned to the Liga I in the 2021–22 season. To the same degree with CS U, FC U claims all the trophies and records of the original club, but according to court orders, its only major honour would be the 1992–93 Cupa României. (Note: As of November 2017, LPF attributes all Universitatea Craiova trophies won between 1948 and 1991 to the CS Universitatea Craiova entity. FC U's only major trophy would be the 1992–93 Cupa României, although it is also claimed by CS U. Another court order from 2018 suggested that neither of the current clubs actually hold the original honours.) .

== History ==
=== 1991–2011: Ups and downs ===
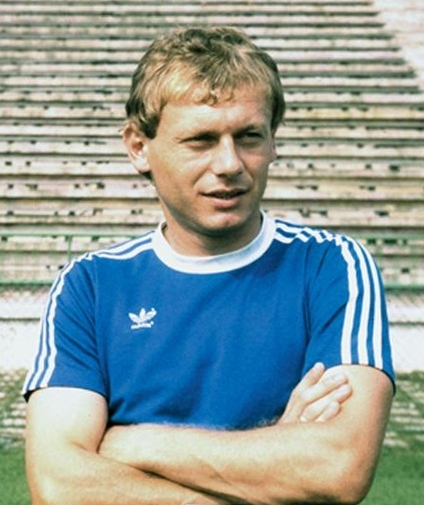
Ilie Balaci, a member of both Universitatea golden teams and manager in 1998

In 1991, Universitatea Craiova conquered its last national title and Romanian Cup, under the management of Sorin Cârțu. However, in the same year, the CS Universitatea Craiova sports club dissolved its football section and Fotbal Club Universitatea Craiova continued its tradition until the early 2010s (until 1994, the club was still controlled by the Ministry of National Education). After disappointing results in the 1991–92 European Cup and 1992–93 UEFA Cup campaigns Universitatea Craiova saw domestic glory by winning the 1992–93 Cupa României and finishing on the podium the same year. After that they will go on the 1993–94 European Cup Winners' Cup campaign where they will be eliminated by French side Paris Saint-Germain. The next seasons Craiova will finish second in the league in 1993–94 and 1994–95 respectively and will lose two cup finals in 1993–94 and 1997–98, also participating in 1994–95 UEFA Cup and 1995–96 Intertoto Cup.

Universitatea Craiova started the 2000s playing a Cup final in 2000 and with participations in the 2000–01 UEFA Cup and 2001 Intertoto Cup. The next 5 seasons saw Craiova finishing between 4th and 8th places but relegating in 2005. The team will go back up after one season in Divizia B. The next three seasons saw Craiova between the 9th and 7th places. During these years in the 2008–09 Liga 1 with Nicolò Napoli as manager and players like Costea brothers (Florin Costea and Mihai Costea), Andrei Prepeliță or Julius Wobay, Craiova had a decent run winning against rivals Dinamo and defending champions CFR Cluj and almost qualifying for the 2009–10 UEFA Europa League. The next year Craiova relegated again and legal problems started to appear.

=== 2011–2013: Decline and legal problems ===
On 20 July 2011, the club was temporarily excluded by the Romanian Football Federation for failing to withdraw their dispute with former coach Victor Piţurcă from a civil court, as per article 57 of the FRF statute which states that the Football Federation solves all the sports lawsuits. However, the article allows disputes regarding employment contracts to be adjudicated in civil court. The exclusion decision was approved by the FRF General Assembly on 14 May 2012. All of the squad players were declared free agents and signed with other clubs.

A criminal investigation was started by the National Anticorruption Directorate on 22 October 2011, against the heads of the Romanian Professional Football League and of the Football Federation, as well as against the executive committee members of the FRF, on charges of official misconduct in the case of the exclusion. On 14 May 2012, the executive committee validated the temporary exclusion decision taken on 20 July 2011.

In April 2014 the High Court of Cassation and Justice confirmed that the Romanian Football Federation "acted in accordance with regulations and statutes in force when members voted to exclude the club". The criminal case against the president of the FRF was also dismissed in 2017. On 22 June 2012, the Bucharest Court of Appeal ruled that the exclusion of FC U Craiova from FRF was illegal. On 15 November 2012, the Court ruled that the validation decision was also illegal. Although the club was invited to sign up in the Liga II for the 2012–13 season, the owner of the club refused this invitation.

However, I think that FC U Craiova is the real team (Universitea Craiova), the one patronized by Adrian Mititelu.

— Ilie Blaci, The symbol of Craiova Maxima era, on 14 October 2013

On 2 March 2013, the club announced that it filed a request to rejoin the competitions, starting from the 2013–14 season, in Liga II. However, at the same time, the local authorities from the city of Craiova created another football team, called CS Universitatea Craiova, claiming the right to continue the team that was removed from Liga I in 2011. A new legal battle soon started between the two. Eventually CS Universitatea was acknowledged as owner of the "Universitatea Craiova" brand and was allowed to list the record of Universitatea Craiova between 1948 and 1991, but not with the record for the next 20 years, that Universitatea is now allowed to claim.

In the meantime, in the summer of 2013, both Universitatea and CS Universitatea officially rejoined the Liga II competition, Series II. The first match of this team was the victory against SCM Argeşul Piteşti in the fourth round of the Romanian Cup, qualifying to the fifth round of the competition. Universitatea and CS Universitatea competed in the same league and met in two games that year, both ended 0–0. With a more stable and sustainable financing, CS Universitatea promoted to Liga I that year, while Universitatea withdrew from the competition. The company operating the team went bankrupt, so Universitatea no longer appeared in any competition.

=== 2017–present: Rebirth ===
In 2017, Adrian Mititelu created a new company and his team was allowed to participate in the top regional tier of Dolj County. The team consisted of a lot of young prospects and experienced players that played for the team in the past like Ovidiu Dănănae and Mihai Dina and Nicolò Napoli in his fifth spell as a manager. The team managed to win the county championship without a single defeat and the Dolj County phase of the Romanian Cup achieving the double at the county level. By winning the championship FC U Craiova qualified for the Liga IV 2017–2018 promotion play-offs to Liga III which they won by forfeit because the team they were drawn against could not play the match.

In the 2018–2019 season, U Craiova 1948 now in Liga III, former player Mădălin Ciucă returned as team captain until his retiring after the season. Unfortunately the team failed to gain promotion to Liga II after finishing on second place. FC U Craiova tried again to promote to Liga II during the 2019–20 season of Liga III after they were drawn in a series IV consisting of teams from south-west region of Romania and Eugen Trică being appointed as manager. The team were leading the table by 13-point from the second place with 13 wins, 3 draws and 0 defeats but the season was interrupted on 9 March 2020, after 16 rounds, due to COVID-19 pandemic. On 11 May 2020, the Romanian Football Federation announced that the season was discontinued and the best-ranked teams from each series (after 16 rounds) were promoted to Liga II.

For the 2020–21 U Craiova 1948 brought a lot of reinforcement like Jérémy Huyghebaert, Andrea Compagno and the representative of the youth nationals teams Dragoș Albu who would later become team's captain to get the promotion in the first year. The season saw U Craiova on top of the league most of the time but during it, there were five managerial changes. Eugen Trică will get sacked in the pre-season in favor of former manager Nicolò Napoli who was in his sixth spell at the club. He left with a high profile win against Bucharest rivals Rapid București, only to be replaced by Dan Vasilică who was the caretaker for the team until Ovidiu Stîngă was appointed. Eventually after poor results from Stîngă, Trică returned once again. Ultimately U Craiova reached the play-offs of the competition and got the promotion to Liga 1 after a draw against FK Miercurea Ciuc, and later secured the title after a win over Rapid. This promotion meant that after a lot of ups and downs over the last 10 years, U Craiova 1948 got in to the first tier of Romanian football for the first time since 2011.

==== Liga I return (2021–2024) ====
For the first year in Liga I, after a 10 years absence, U Craiova changed a lot in the squad; with a lot of players no longer needed, many foreigners were brought to the club, most notably Juan Bauza, Samuel Asamoah, and Dominik Kovačić. Also brought as a coach was a former national for Romania with a joint record of 35 goals (alongside Gheorghe Hagi) Adrian Mutu. Like the previous season, U Craiova went through managerial changes, Adrian Mutu will get sacked and will be followed by Eugen Trică and Flavius Stoican with Dan Vasilică acting as a caretaker in between those changes, only for Nicolò Napoli to return to Craiova for the 7th time. Napoli revitalized the entire squad but being to far away from the play-offs at the time of his spell Craiova went to the play-out round of the competition and managed to achieve the goal of avoiding relegation finishing on the 10th place.

The 2022–23 season of Liga I was rebranded as Superliga, making U Craiova 1948 a founding member of the new branded Romanian first tier league like England's Premier League which started in 1992 or the Bundesliga who started in 1963. This season was approached by U Craiova again with an addition of new players to the team, among whom the most notable throughout the season were André Duarte, who logged the most minutes of a player in the entire season (4066 minutes) and Yassine Bahassa who was named the best dribbler of the season and with Marius Croitoru being named as the coach. The season had a lot of ups and downs, with Marius Croitoru being sacked at the half of the regular season only for Nicolò Napoli to be brought back for a record ninth spell at the club. During this time Napoli was close to getting the team into the play-off round, finishing the regular season on the 7th place 2 points away from the 6th place. Craiova was then going to win the play-out round, qualifying for the European play-offs. In the European play-offs Craiova beat in semi-finals FC Voluntari only to lose to CFR Cluj in the final after a very close match, with some refereeing mistakes.

The 2023–24 season marked a challenging period for FC U Craiova 1948, characterized by instability in the managerial position. The campaign began with the appointment of Giovanni Costantino, who was relieved of his duties after a tenure of five months. His departure led to the brief return of Nicolo Napoli, marking his tenth term at the helm, which lasted for four matches before being succeeded by Eugen Trică. Despite these changes, the team was unable to secure its position in Liga 1, culminating in relegation after a three-year stint in the top flight. This season stands as a stark contrast to the club's previous successes following its promotion.

==== 2024–25 Return to Liga II and financial problems ====
In May 2024, FC U Craiova 1948, the team owned by Adrian Mititelu, was relegated to Liga II after losing to FC Hermannstadt (1–3) in the final match of the SuperLiga play-out. Immediately after relegation, the club began parting ways with important players, including Aurelian Chițu, Gabriel Compagnucci, Leo Lacroix, Matheus Mascarenhas, Van Durmen, Achim, and Bahassa. Additionally, goalkeeping coach Gabriele Aldegani and assistant coach Florin Drăgan also ended their collaboration with the team.

Adrian Mititelu clarified that the team would remain in Craiova and play at the Ion Oblemenco Stadium (officially called the "Craiova Sports Complex") during the following season, rejecting rumors of a move to Târgu Jiu. In the summer of 2024, Marius Croitoru was appointed as head coach with the clear goal of promoting back to the SuperLiga.

During the 2024–25 season, the club accumulated several disciplinary files due to debts to former players and other clubs (including Dinamo) finishing the regular season in 9th place and 3rd in their Relegation play-out group.

==== Denial of Liga II License and "Administrative Relegation" ====
By June 2025, the club had been already deducted 14 points and later an additional 18 points, reaching a total of −32 points before the start of the season, facing the possibility of club exclusion from the league if the debts were not paid on time.

On 18 June 2025, the FRF released the list of licensed clubs for Liga II for the 2025–26 season, and FC U Craiova 1948 did not obtain the license, as Mititelu refused to apply for it, arguing that the federation was acting illegally. As a result, the club was demoted to Liga III.

Later, in July 2025, Mititelu warned that if the FRF does not allow the team to participate in Liga II, he would proceed with the club's dissolution for the second time after the one in 2016.

== Stadium ==
=== Stadionul Ion Oblemenco (1967) ===
Ion Oblemenco Stadium was a multi-purpose stadium in Craiova, and was originally named Central Stadium. It was used mostly for football matches and would hold up to 25,252 people before it was demolished. The stadium was opened on 29 October 1967, with the national teams of Romania and Poland drawing after scoring two goals each. Following the death of Universitatea Craiova legend Ion Oblemenco in 1996, the stadium was renamed in his honour. In 1991 the nocturnal facility was built (non-functional until 2002 ), in 2002 the wooden benches were replaced with plastic seats. The 2002–2003 season remains imprinted in capital letters in the history of the "Ion Oblemenco" stadium. 28 November 2002 is the day when the first training session of the University of Craiova took place under the spotlight, which was attended by around 2000 spectators. On 29 November 2002, the official opening of the nocturne took place in front of 15,000 spectators, and on 30 November 2002, the first night match was played: U Craiova -Ceahlăul Piatra-Neamț, a match attended by about 40,000 spectators. At the beginning of the 2007–2008 season the official stand and the changing rooms of the stadium were renovated, as well as the athletics track . In the return of the same season, other works were started to modernize the arena, consisting in the purchase and installation of 25,000 new seats, the purchase and installation of an ultra-modern table, and also the replacement of the lawn, and in 2015 was entirely demolished.

=== The new Stadionul Ion Oblemenco ===
Construction of the new Stadionul Ion Oblemenco, with a capacity of 30,983, started on 7 September 2015, after the demolition of the old Stadionul Ion Oblemenco. On 10 November 2017, the arena, which cost €52 million, was inaugurated. The first official match was in Liga I on 18 November 2017, between CSU Craiova and Juventus București, attended by 17,854 fans.

FCU Football Park

Upon exclusion from the third division, the club plays at the "FCU Football Park" also known as "TĂRÂMUL LEILOR", their €12.000.000 training ground built in 2021.

== Support ==
FC U Craiova has many fans in Craiova and especially in the region of Oltenia, but also in Romania.

Many ultras groups exist, but in 2013 a strong division among the fans occurred due to the uncertainty regarding the true identities of the two clubs which claim the record of Universitatea. Sezione Ultra' 2000 and Utopia from Peluza Nord chose to support CS U Craiova, while Praetoria and Ultras 2004 from Peluza Sud 97 chose FC U Craiova. Later in 2017, Ultras Craiova 2004 left the club and decided to remain neutral. In March 2018, FC U Craiova supporters attending a friendly game between Romania and Sweden at the Stadionul Ion Oblemenco booed CS U player Alexandru Mitriță upon being substituted out. They also broke chairs, and as a response CS U fans symbolically used insecticide to "get rid of the stench" left over by Peluza Sud 97 ultras. Also, Peluză Sud Craiova '97 and Praetoria ‘05 has a friendship with Fervent '07 from Farul Constanța.

=== Rivalries ===
FC U's main rival is Dinamo București. The rivalry was amplified in 2002 and 2005 when Dinamo transferred an important group of players from Craiova. Other rivalries of FC U are with Steaua București and CSU Craiova, the latter rivalry because FC U claims the history of Universitatea.

== Honours ==
Note: The attribution of Universitatea Craiova's historical honours (1948–1991) has been disputed between the successor entities. In July 2023, the Timișoara Court of Appeal ruled that the historical record achieved until the end of the 1990–91 season belongs to CS Universitatea Craiova. In February 2026, Romanian media reported that the Timișoara Court of Appeal rejected CS Universitatea Craiova's appeal in the litigation and upheld the effects of the 2017 Dolj Tribunal decision, interpreted as assigning the 1948–1991 record to the entity associated with FC U Craiova 1948, with some reports noting the possibility of further appeal to the High Court of Cassation and Justice. In early 2026, the update was also reflected in external databases, as reported by Romanian press.

=== Domestic ===
==== Leagues ====
- Divizia A / Liga I
  - Winners (4): 1973–74, 1979–80, 1980–81, 1990–91
  - Runners-up (2): 1993–94, 1994–95
- Divizia B / Liga II
  - Winners (2): 2005–06, 2020–21
- Liga III
  - Winners (1): 2019–20
  - Runners-up (1): 2018–19
- Liga IV Dolj
  - Winners (1): 2017–18

==== Cups ====
- Cupa României
  - Winners (6): 1976–77, 1977–78, 1980–81, 1982–83, 1990–91, 1992–93
  - Runners-up (3): 1993–94, 1997–98, 1999–2000
- Cupa României – Dolj County
  - Winners (1): 2017–18

=== Friendly ===
- Norcia Winter Cup Italy
  - Winners (1): 2003

== European record ==
Competition	S	P	W	D	L	GF	GA	GD
UEFA Champions League / European Cup	1	2	1	0	1	2	3	−1
UEFA Cup Winners' Cup / European Cup Winners' Cup	1	4	2	0	2	7	6	+1
UEFA Europa League / UEFA Cup	4	8	0	3	5	3	9	−6
UEFA Intertoto Cup	2	8	4	2	2	15	11	+4
Total	8	22	7	5	10	27	29	−2

=== UEFA Champions League / European Cup ===
Season	Round	Club	Home	Away	Aggregate
1991–92	1R	(Cyprus) Apollon Limassol	2–0	0–3	2–3

=== UEFA Cup Winners' Cup / European Cup Winners' Cup ===
Season	Round	Club	Home	Away	Aggregate
1993–94	1R	(Faroe Islands) HB Tórshavn	4–0	3–0	7–0
1993–94	2R	(France) PSG	0–2	0–4	0–6

=== UEFA Europa League / UEFA Cup ===
Season	Round	Club	Home	Away	Aggregate
1992–93	1R	(Czech Republic) Sigma Olomouc	1–2	0–1	1–3
1994–95	PR	(Georgia (country)) Dinamo Tbilisi	1–2	0–2	1–4
1995–96	PR	(Belarus) Dinamo Minsk	0–0	0–0 (a.e.t.)	0–0 (1–3 p)
2000–01	QR	(North Macedonia) Pobeda Prilep	1–1	0–1	1–2

=== UEFA Intertoto Cup ===
Season	Round	Club	Home	Away	Aggregate
1996	Group stage (9)	(Latvia) Daugava	3–0	—N/a	2nd place
1996	Group stage (9)	(Germany) Karlsruher SC	—N/a	0–1	2nd place
1996	Group stage (9)	(Slovakia) Spartak Trnava	2–1	—N/a	2nd place
1996	Group stage (9)	(Serbia and Montenegro) Čukarički	—N/a	2–1	2nd place
2001	1R	(Albania) Bylis	3–3	1–0	4–3
2001	2R	(Czech Republic) Slovácko	2–2	2–3	4–5

== League history ==
Season	Tier	Division	Place	National Cup
2026–27	4	Liga IV	TBD	First Round
2025–26	3	Liga III (Seria V)	12th (R)	
2024–25	2	Liga II	11th (R)	Play-off round
2023–24	1	Liga I	16th (R)	Quarter-finals
2022–23	1	Liga I	7th	Quarter-finals
2021–22	1	Liga I	10th	Round of 16
2020–21	2	Liga II	1st (C, P)	Round of 32
2019–20	3	Liga III (Seria IV)	1st (C, P)	Round of 32
2018–19	3	Liga III (Seria III)	2nd	Second round
2017–18	4	Liga IV (DJ)	1st (C, P)	(winners of county phase)
2014–17	Not active			
2013–14	2	Liga II	12th (R)	Round of 32
2011–13	Not active (disaffiliated)			
2010–11	1	Liga I	15th (R)	Quarter-finals
2009–10	1	Liga I	13th	Quarter-finals
2008–09	1	Liga I	7th	Round of 16

Season	Tier	Division	Place	National Cup
2007–08	1	Liga I	9th	Round of 32
2006–07	1	Liga I	9th	Round of 16
2005–06	2	Divizia B (Seria II)	1st (C, P)	Round of 16
2004–05	1	Divizia A	16th (R)	Semi-finals
2003–04	1	Divizia A	4th	Round of 32
2002–03	1	Divizia A	7th	Round of 32
2001–02	1	Divizia A	7th	Round of 32
2000–01	1	Divizia A	8th	Round of 16
1999–00	1	Divizia A	13th	Final
1998–99	1	Divizia A	13th	Round of 16
1997–98	1	Divizia A	8th	Final
1996–97	1	Divizia A	11th	Semi-finals
1995–96	1	Divizia A	4th	Round of 32
1994–95	1	Divizia A	2nd	Semi-finals
1993–94	1	Divizia A	2nd	Final
1992–93	1	Divizia A	3rd	Winners
1991–92	1	Divizia A	4th	Semi-finals

== Notable former players ==
The footballers enlisted below have had a significant number of caps and goals accumulated throughout a certain number of seasons for the club and the players whose name is listed in bold represented their countries at junior and/or senior level while they played for the club.

Romania

- (Romania) **Vlad Achim**
- (Romania) **Dragoș Albu**
- (Romania) Claudiu Bălan
- (Romania) **Ștefan Bărboianu**
- (Romania) (Moldova) **Vladislav Blănuță**
- (Romania) Mircea Bornescu
- (Romania) Aurelian Chițu
- (Romania) **Cristian Chivu**
- (Romania) Mădălin Ciucă
- (Romania) **Florin Costea**
- (Romania) **Mihai Costea**
- (Romania) **Gheorghe Craioveanu**
- (Romania) **Cătălin Crăciunescu**
- (Romania) **Silvian Cristescu**
- (Romania) **Ovidiu Dănănae**
- (Romania) Mihai Dina
- (Romania) **Dragoș Firțulescu**
- (Romania) **Cornel Frăsineanu**
- (Romania) **Ionel Gane**
- (Romania) **Ionel Ganea**
- (Romania) **Valerică Găman**
- (Romania) **Constantin Gângioveanu**
- (Romania) Silviu Lung Jr.
- (Romania) **Ionuț Luțu**
- (Romania) **Radu Negru**
- (Romania) **Corneliu Papură**
- (Romania) **Vlad Pop**
- (Romania) **Robert Popa**
- (Romania) **Gabriel Popescu**
- (Romania) Andrei Prepeliță
- (Romania) **Mihai Răduț**
- (Romania) Marius Sava
- (Romania) Robert Săceanu
- (Romania) **Ovidiu Stîngă**
- (Romania) Ovidiu Stoianof
- (Romania) **Dorel Stoica**
- (Romania) Eugen Trică
- (Romania) Adrian Ungur

Argentina

- (Argentina) Juan Bauza

Australia

- (Australia) Michael Baird
- (Australia) **Spase Dilevski**
- (Australia) Josh Mitchell
- (Australia) Joshua Rose

Belgium

- (Belgium) **William Baeten**
- (Belgium) Jérémy Huyghebaert
- (Belgium) Benjamin Van Durmen
- (Belgium) **Sekou Sidibe**

France

- (France) Yassine Bahassa

Italy

- (Italy) Andrea Compagno
- (Italy) Andrea Padula
- (Italy) Lorenzo Paramatti

Portugal

- (Portugal) André Duarte

Togo

- (Togo) **Samuel Asamoah**

Sierra Leone

- (Sierra Leone) **Julius Wobay**

== Player of the Year ==
Each season since 2021 the fans have voted through a poll on the U Craiova official Facebook page the player on the team they feel is the most worthy of recognition for his performances during that season.

Year	Winner
2020–21	(Italy) Andrea Compagno
2021–22	(Italy) Andrea Compagno
2022–23	(Portugal) André Duarte
2023–24	Not awarded

== Continental competition players ==
The following players have been selected by their country in various continental tournaments, while playing for U Craiova 1948. Players listed in bold are current U Craiova 1948 players.

- (Romania) **Dragoș Albu** (2023 UEFA European Under-21 Championship)
- (Romania) Cornel Frăsineanu (1998 UEFA European Under-21 Championship)
- (Romania) Marius Iordache (1998 UEFA European Under-21 Championship)
- (Romania) Tiberiu Lung (1998 UEFA European Under-21 Championship)
- (Romania) Ionuț Luțu (1998 UEFA European Under-21 Championship)
- (Romania) Ionuț Mișu (2011 UEFA European Under-17 Championship)
- (Romania) Corneliu Papură (1994 FIFA World Cup)
- (Romania) **Vlad Pop** (2023 UEFA European Under-21 Championship)
- (Romania) **Robert Popa** (2022 UEFA European Under-19 Championship)
- (Romania) Florin Prunea (UEFA Euro 2000)
- (Romania) Ovidiu Stîngă (1994 FIFA World Cup)
- (Romania) Eugen Trică (1998 UEFA European Under-21 Championship)
- (Romania) Robert Vancea (1998 UEFA European Under-21 Championship)

== Notable former coaches ==
- (Romania) Ilie Balaci
- (Romania) Marian Bondrea
- (Romania) Sorin Cârţu
- (Romania) Emerich Jenei
- (Italy) Nicolò Napoli
- (Romania) Ion Oblemenco
- (Romania) Constantin Oţet
- (Romania) Aurel Țicleanu
- (Romania) Victor Piţurcă
- (Romania) Mircea Rădulescu
- (Romania) Emil Sandoi
- (Romania) Silviu Stănescu
- (Spain) José Ramón Alexanko
