= Shon Edri =

Israeli footballer (born 2003)

Personal information
- Date of birth: 24 October 2003 (age 23)
- Place of birth: Gedera, Israel
- Height: 1.86 m (6 ft 1 in)
- Position: Centre-back

Team information
- Current team: Hapoel Rishon LeZion
- Number: 33

Youth career
- 2011–2022: Maccabi Tel Aviv

Senior career*
Years	Team	Apps	(Gls)
2022–	Maccabi Tel Aviv	1	(0)
2022–2023	→ Hapoel Ashdod (loan)	32	(3)
2023–2024	→ Hapoel Ramat HaSharon (loan)	34	(6)
2024	→ Ironi Kiryat Shmona (loan)	9	(0)
2025	→ Hapoel Petah Tikva (loan)	16	(0)
2025–	→ Hapoel Rishon LeZion (loan)	1	(0)

International career^{‡}
2021–2022	Israel U19	19	(1)
2023–2024	Israel U20	3	(0)
Medal record
Representing Israel U-19
UEFA European Under-19 Championship
Runner-up	2022 Slovakia	Team
Representing Israel U-20
FIFA U-20 World Cup
Third place	2023 Argentina	Team
- * Club domestic league appearances and goals as of 24 June 2026 ‡ National team caps and goals as of 4 June 2023

Shon Edri (or Sean Edry, Hebrew: שון עדרי; born 24 October 2003) is an Israeli professional footballer who plays as a centre-back for Maccabi Tel Aviv.

== Early life ==
Edri was born and raised in Gedera, Israel, to an Israeli family of both Mizrahi Jewish and Sephardi Jewish descent (French-Jewish).

He also holds a French passport, on account of his Sephardi Jewish descent (French-Jewish) ancestors, which eases the move to certain European football leagues.

== Club career ==
=== Maccabi Tel Aviv ===
Edri started his career in the Maccabi Tel Aviv's children team. On 3 March 2022, he made his senior debut with at the 4–0 win against Maccabi Jaffa at the Israeli State Cup.

On 18 July 2022, Edri signed for three years at the senior team and was immediately loaned to Hapoel Ashdod.

== International career ==
Edri played for the Israel national under-19 team.

== Career statistics ==
=== Club ===
As of 1 June 2022

Appearances and goals by club, season and competition
Club	Season	League			State Cup		Toto Cup		Continental		Other		Total	
Club	Season	Division	Apps	Goals	Apps	Goals	Apps	Goals	Apps	Goals	Apps	Goals	Apps	Goals
Maccabi Tel Aviv	2021–22	Israeli Premier League	0	0	1	0	0	0	0	0	0	0	1	0
Hapoel Ashdod	2022–23	Liga Leumit	32	3	2	0	4	0	0	0	0	0	39	3
Hapoel Ramat HaSharon	2023–24	Liga Leumit	34	6	3	3	4	0	0	0	0	0	41	9
Ironi Kiryat Shmona	2024–25	Israeli Premier League	9	0	1	0	5	0	0	0	0	0	15	0
Hapoel Petah Tikva	2024–25	Liga Leumit	16	0	0	0	0	0	0	0	0	0	18	0
Hapoel Rishon LeZion	2024–25	0	0	0	0	0	0	0	0	0	0	0	0	
Career total			91	9	7	3	13	0	0	0	0	0	114	12

== See also ==
- List of Jewish footballers
- List of Jews in sports
- List of Israelis
