= Tomer Tzarfati =

Israeli footballer (born 2003)

Tomer Tzarfati תומר צרפתי
Personal information
- Date of birth: 16 October 2003 (age 23)
- Place of birth: Pardes Hanna-Karkur, Israel
- Height: 1.85 m (6 ft 1 in)
- Position: Goalkeeper

Team information
- Current team: Hapoel Kfar Shalem
- Number: 1

Youth career
- 2013–2014: F.C. Pardes Hanna-Karkur
- 2014–2016: Maccabi Barkai
- 2016–2017: Hapoel Hadera
- 2017–2019: Maccabi Haifa
- 2019–2020: Maccabi Netanya
- 2020–2021: Hapoel Be'er Sheva
- 2021–2023: Maccabi Netanya

Senior career*
Years	Team	Apps	(Gls)
2023–	Maccabi Netanya	22	(0)
2026–	→ Hapoel Kfar Shalem	6	(0)

International career^{‡}
2022	Israel U19	6	(0)
2023	Israel U20	3	(0)
2023–2024	Israel U21	6	(0)
Medal record
Representing Israel U-19
UEFA European Under-19 Championship
Runner-up	2022 Slovakia	Team
Representing Israel U-20
FIFA U-20 World Cup
Third place	2023 Argentina	Team
- * Club domestic league appearances and goals as of 24 June 2026 ‡ National team caps and goals as of 12 September 2023

Tomer Tzarfati (or Zarfati, Hebrew: תומר צרפתי; born 16 October 2003) is an Israeli professional footballer who plays as a goalkeeper for Israeli Seacond League club Hapoel Kfar Shalem.

== Early life ==
Tzarfati was born and raised in Pardes Hanna-Karkur, Israel, to an Israeli family of Jewish descent. His father Ilan Tzarfati is a former footballer who currently manages a team, and he is a Baal Tshuva who observes the Jewish Sabbath. His uncle Israel Zarfati is also a football coach.

== Club career ==
Tzarfati began playing for his hometown's club F.C. Pardes Hanna-Karkur's youth academy. During his latter youth he also played for Maccabi Barkai, Hapoel Hadera, Maccabi Haifa, Hapoel Be'er Sheva, and Maccabi Netanya.

On 7 May 2023, he made his senior debut in the Israeli Premier League 4–1 victory over Hapoel Jerusalem.

== International career ==
He has represented Israel at both the under-20 and under-21 levels.

== Career statistics ==
=== Club ===
As of 1 June 2024

Appearances and goals by club, season and competition
Club	Season	League			State Cup		Toto Cup		Continental		Other		Total	
Club	Season	Division	Apps	Goals	Apps	Goals	Apps	Goals	Apps	Goals	Apps	Goals	Apps	Goals
Maccabi Netanya	2022–23	Israeli Premier League	1	0	0	0	0	0	–		0	0	1	0
Maccabi Netanya	2023–24	Israeli Premier League	15	0	1	0	2	0	–		0	0	18	0
Maccabi Netanya	2024–25	Israeli Premier League	0	0	0	0	0	0	–		0	0	0	0
Career total			16	0	1	0	2	0	0	0	0	0	19	0

== See also ==
- List of Jewish footballers
- List of Jews in sports
- List of Israelis
