= El Yam Kancepolsky =

American-born Israeli association footballer (born 2003)

El-Yam Kancepolsky
Personal information
- Date of birth: 22 December 2003 (age 22)
- Place of birth: Hawaii, United States
- Height: 1.82 m (6 ft 0 in)
- Positions: Defensive midfielder; central midfielder

Team information
- Current team: Hapoel Tel Aviv
- Number: 6

Youth career
- 2011–2014: Hapoel Herzliya
- 2014–2022: Hapoel Tel Aviv

Senior career*
Years	Team	Apps	(Gls)
2021–	Hapoel Tel Aviv	81	(1)

International career^{‡}
2019–2020	Israel U17	4	(1)
2021–2022	Israel U19	17	(1)
2023	Israel U20	7	(0)
2022–	Israel U21	4	(0)
Medal record
Representing Israel U-19
UEFA European Under-19 Championship
Runner-up	2022 Slovakia	Team
Representing Israel U-20
FIFA U-20 World Cup
Third place	2023 Argentina	Team
- * Club domestic league appearances and goals as of 23 June 2026 ‡ National team caps and goals as of 12 September 2023

El-Yam Kancepolsky (or Elyam Kanzapolsky, Hebrew: אל-ים קנצפולסקי; born 22 December 2003) is a professional footballer who plays as a defensive midfielder for Israeli Premier League club Hapoel Tel Aviv. Born in the United States, he represents Israel at youth level.

== Early life ==
Kancepolsky was born in Hawaii, United States, to a family of well-known local Israeli swimmers of Ashkenazi Jewish descent who emigrated from Israel a couple of generations prior to his birth. He grew up in Herzliya, Israel.

== Career statistics ==
=== Club ===
As of match played 1 June 2024

Appearances and goals by club, season and competition
Club	Season	League			National cup (Note: Includes the Israel State Cup)		League cup (Note: Includes the Israel Toto Cup (Ligat Ha'Al))		Continental (Europe) (Note: Includes the UEFA Champions League (UCL), the UEFA Europa League (UEL), and the UEFA Conference League (UECL))		Other (Note: Includes the Israeli Super Cup)		Total	
Club	Season	Division	Apps	Goals	Apps	Goals	Apps	Goals	Apps	Goals	Apps	Goals	Apps	Goals
Hapoel Tel Aviv	2020–21	Israeli Premier League	1	0	0	0	0	0	–		0	0	1	0
Hapoel Tel Aviv	2021–22	Israeli Premier League	2	0	0	0	0	0	–		0	0	2	0
Hapoel Tel Aviv	2022–23	Israeli Premier League	22	1	0	0	4	0	–		0	0	26	1
Hapoel Tel Aviv	2023–24	Israeli Premier League	25	0	1	0	5	0	–		0	0	31	0
Hapoel Tel Aviv	2024–25	Liga Leumit	0	0	0	0	0	0	–		0	0	0	0
Hapoel Tel Aviv	Total		50	1	1	0	9	0	0	0	0	0	60	1
Career total			50	1	1	0	9	0	0	0	0	0	60	1

== See also ==
- List of Jewish footballers
- List of Jews in sports
- List of Israelis
