= Dragoș Albu =

Romanian footballer (born 2001)

Personal information
- Full name: Constantin Dragoș Albu
- Date of birth: 15 March 2001 (age 25)
- Place of birth: Oprișor, Romania
- Height: 1.75 m (5 ft 9 in)
- Position: Midfielder

Team information
- Current team: Corvinul Hunedoara
- Number: 8

Youth career
- 2010–2011: Unirea Tricolor Drobeta
- 2011–2012: CSJ Știința U Craiova
- 2012–2015: CSȘ Craiova
- 2015–2017: Școala de Fotbal Gheorghe Popescu
- 2017–2018: Utrecht

Senior career*
Years	Team	Apps	(Gls)
2017–2020	Jong Utrecht	13	(1)
2020–2025	FC U Craiova	115	(9)
2024–2025	→ Gloria Buzău (loan)	29	(0)
2025–2026	Hermannstadt	38	(3)
2026–	Corvinul Hunedoara	5	(0)

International career
2017	Romania U16	2	(1)
2017–2018	Romania U17	7	(0)
2018	Romania U18	3	(0)
2021–2023	Romania U21	11	(1)
- * Club domestic league appearances and goals as of 7 November 2026

Constantin Dragoș Albu (born 15 March 2001) is a Romanian professional footballer who plays as a midfielder for Liga I club Corvinul Hunedoara.

== Club career ==
Albu made his senior debut for Jong FC Utrecht on 23 December 2017, coming on as a 79th-minute substitute for Shayne Pattynama in a 1–3 Eerste Divisie loss to Fortuna Sittard.

In the summer of 2020, he returned to Romania by signing with FC U Craiova.

On 5 September 2024, Albu was sent on loan for the rest of the season to Gloria Buzău.

== International career ==
Albu is a Romania youth international, and has represented the country at under-16, under-17, under-18, and under-21 levels. He was selected by the latter side for the 2023 UEFA European Championship.

== Career statistics ==
As of match played 7 November 2026

Appearances and goals by club, season and competition
Club	Season	League			National cup (Note: Includes Cupa României)		Europe		Other		Total	
Club	Season	Division	Apps	Goals	Apps	Goals	Apps	Goals	Apps	Goals	Apps	Goals
Jong Utrecht	2017–18	Eerste Divisie	1	0	—		—		—		1	0
Jong Utrecht	2018–19	Eerste Divisie	12	1	—		—		—		12	1
Jong Utrecht	2019–20	Eerste Divisie	0	0	—		—		—		0	0
Jong Utrecht	Total		13	1	—		—		—		13	1
FC U Craiova	2020–21	Liga II	27	3	1	0	—		—		28	3
FC U Craiova	2021–22	Liga I	26	0	1	0	—		—		27	0
FC U Craiova	2022–23	Liga I	22	4	4	0	—		2 (Note: Appearance in Liga I play-offs for UEFA Europa Conference League)	0	28	4
FC U Craiova	2023–24	Liga I	35	2	3	0	—		—		39	2
FC U Craiova	2024–25	Liga II	5	0	1	0	—		—		6	0
FC U Craiova	Total		115	9	10	0	—		2	0	128	9
Gloria Buzău (loan)	2024–25	Liga I	29	0	—		—		—		29	0
Hermannstadt	2025–26	Liga I	38	3	3	0	—		2 (Note: Appearances in Liga I promotion/relegation play-offs)	0	43	3
Corvinul Hunedoara	2026–27	Liga I	5	0	1	0	—		—		6	0
Career total			200	13	14	0	—		4	0	218	13

== Honours ==
FC U Craiova

- Liga II: 2020–21
