= Ahmed Salman =

Israeli footballer (born 2004)

Personal information
- Full name: Ahmed Ibrahim Salman
- Date of birth: 22 March 2004 (age 22)
- Place of birth: Jerusalem, Israel
- Height: 1.85 m (6 ft 1 in)
- Position: Forward

Team information
- Current team: Bnei Sakhnin
- Number: 29

Youth career
- 2018–2020: Hapoel Katamon
- 2020–2021: Hapoel Jerusalem

Senior career*
Years	Team	Apps	(Gls)
2021–2023	Hapoel Jerusalem	25	(1)
2023–2024	Maccabi Netanya	37	(1)
2024–	Bnei Sakhnin	59	(9)

International career^{‡}
2021–	Israel U19	23	(3)
2023–	Israel U20	5	(0)
Medal record
Representing Israel U-19
UEFA European Under-19 Championship
Runner-up	2022 Slovakia	Team
FIFA U-20 World Cup
Third place	2023 Argentina	Team
- * Club domestic league appearances and goals as of 24 June 2026 ‡ National team caps and goals as of 4 June 2023

Ahmed Ibrahim Salman (or Ahmad Ibrahim, Arabic: احمد ابراهيم سلمان, Hebrew: אחמד איברהים סלמאן; born 22 March 2004) is an Arab-Israeli professional footballer who plays as a forward for Israeli Premier League club Bnei Sakhnin.

== Early life ==
Salman was born and raised in the Beit Safafa neighbourhood of East Jerusalem, Israel, to a Muslim-Arab family.

== Club career ==
Salman signed with Israeli club Hapoel Jerusalem's youth team when he was 14. In his first season at the club, he scored 27 goals. On 31 July 2021 he made his senior debut in a 1–0 win against Beitar Jerusalem. On 21 December he scored his debut goal in the 3–1 win against Hapoel Nof HaGalil.

On 10 January 2023 signed for Maccabi Netanya.

On 1 August 2024 signed for Bnei Sakhnin

== International career ==
Salman is a member of the Israel U19 since 2021. He is also a member of the Israel U20 since 2023.
