= Ilay Madmon =

Israeli footballer

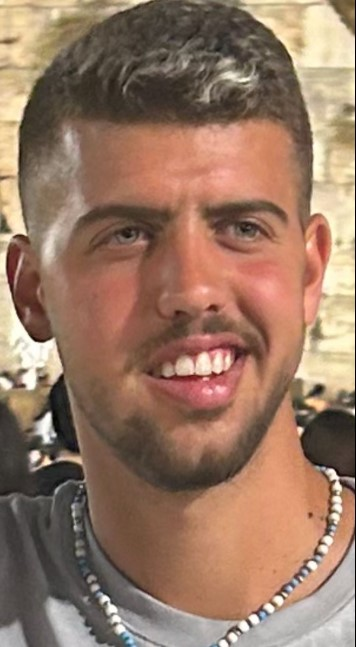
- Madmon in 2024

Personal information
- Date of birth: 23 February 2003 (age 23)
- Place of birth: Ein HaBesor, Israel
- Height: 1.78 m (5 ft 10 in)
- Position: Midfielder

Team information
- Current team: Hapoel Jerusalem
- Number: 8

Youth career
- Hapoel Be'er Sheva

Senior career*
Years	Team	Apps	(Gls)
2020–2024	Hapoel Be'er Sheva	30	(0)
2021–2022	→ Bnei Yehuda Tel Aviv (loan)	34	(2)
2022–2023	→ Beitar Jerusalem (loan)	21	(1)
2024–	Hapoel Jerusalem	44	(4)

International career
2018	Israel U16	6	(0)
2019–2020	Israel U17	16	(1)
2021–2022	Israel U19	14	(1)
2023	Israel U20	5	(0)
2022–2024	Israel U21	1	(0)
Medal record
Representing Israel U-19
UEFA European Under-19 Championship
Runner-up	2022 Slovakia	Team
Representing Israel U-20
FIFA U-20 World Cup
Third place	2023 Argentina	Team
- * Club domestic league appearances and goals as of 24 June 2026

Ilay Madmon (or Ilai Madmoun, Hebrew: איליי מדמון; born 23 February 2003) is an Israeli professional footballer who plays as a midfielder for Israeli Premier League club Hapoel Jerusalem, captains the Israel national under-20 team, and plays for the Israel national under-21 team.

== Early life ==
Madmon was born and raised in moshav Ein HaBesor, Israel, to an Israeli family of Mizrahi Jewish (Yemeni-Jewish) and Sephardi Jewish descent. His father Moshe Madmon hails from a local agricultural family who mainly specializes in growing tomatoes.

He also holds a Spanish passport, on account of his Sephardi Jewish ancestors, which eases the move to certain European football leagues.

== Club career ==
=== Hapoel Beer Sheva ===
Madmon made his senior debut with Israeli Premier League club Hapoel Be'er Sheva on 4 July 2020, as well as in the opening line-up against Hapoel Haifa, in a home match that ended in a 3–1 win for his team.

Madmon made his senior debut in the 2020–21 UEFA Europa League against German side Bayer Leverkusen on 26 November 2020, coming in as an 81st-minute substitute in a 1–4 away loss.

== International career ==
Since 2021 to 2022, he has played for as well as captained the Israel national under-19 team during the 2022 UEFA European Under-19 Championship first qualifiers and all its way to the Final against England U-19 on 1 July 2022, where his native Israel finished 2nd. He also scored against Austria U-19 during the group stage. Madmon was officially named by UEFA as part of its "2022 Under-19 EURO Team of the Tournament".

Thanks to that, the Israel U-20 has also qualified to the 2023 FIFA U-20 World Cup, which Madmon currently captains.

He also capped once with the Israel U-21 in 2022.

== Career statistics ==
=== Club ===
As of 1 June 2022

Appearances and goals by club, season and competition
Club	Season	League			State Cup		Toto Cup		Continental		Other		Total	
Club	Season	Division	Apps	Goals	Apps	Goals	Apps	Goals	Apps	Goals	Apps	Goals	Apps	Goals
Hapoel Be'er Sheva	2019–20	Israeli Premier League	3	0	0	0	0	0	–		0	0	3	0
Hapoel Be'er Sheva	2020–21	Israeli Premier League	18	0	1	0	1	0	3	0	2	0	25	0
Hapoel Be'er Sheva	2021–22	Israeli Premier League	0	0	0	0	1	0	–		0	0	1	0
Hapoel Be'er Sheva	2022–23	Israeli Premier League	2	0	0	0	0	0	2	0	1	0	5	0
Hapoel Be'er Sheva	Total		23	0	1	0	2	0	5	0	3	0	34	0
Bnei Yehuda Tel Aviv	2021–22	Liga Leumit	34	2	3	1	0	0	–		0	0	37	3
Beitar Jerusalem	2022–23	Israeli Premier League	0	0	0	0	0	0	–		0	0	0	0
Career total			57	2	4	1	2	0	5	0	3	0	71	3

== Honours ==
Hapoel Be'er Sheva

- Israel State Cup: 2019–20
- Israel Super Cup: 2022

Beitar Jerusalem

- Israel State Cup: 2022–23

Individual

- UEFA European Under-19 Championship Team of the Tournament: 2022

== See also ==
- List of Jewish footballers
- List of Jews in sports
- List of Israelis
