= Samuel Mischitz =

Austrian footballer (born 2003)

Personal information
- Date of birth: 14 August 2003 (age 23)
- Place of birth: Bregenz, Austria
- Height: 1.75 m (5 ft 9 in)
- Position: Right-back

Team information
- Current team: SV Rohrbach an der Lafnitz

Youth career
- 2011–2017: SV Lochau
- 2017–2021: AKA Vorarlberg

Senior career*
Years	Team	Apps	(Gls)
2021–2025	Rheindorf Altach	20	(0)
2023–2024	→ Dornbirn (loan)	21	(0)
2025–2026	SC Retz	20	(0)
2026–	SV Rohrbach an der Lafnitz		

International career^{‡}
2018	Austria U16	2	(0)
2019	Austria U17	1	(1)
2022	Austria U19	2	(0)
2022	Austria U21	2	(0)
- * Club domestic league appearances and goals as of 6 June 2026 ‡ National team caps and goals as of 27 September 2022

Samuel Mischitz (born 14 August 2003) is an Austrian professional footballer who plays as a right-back for SV Rohrbach an der Lafnitz. He has represented Austria internationally on junior levels.

== Club career ==
Mischitz began his career with SV Lochau. In 2017, he moved to the regional academy of AKA Vorarlberg, where he progressed through all youth teams in the following four seasons. In September 2020, he signed a professional contract with Rheindorf Altach, which had already been reported as his first senior club ahead the 2020–21 season. Before the 2021–22 season, he was officially promoted to the first-team squad competing in the Austrian Football Bundesliga.

Mischitz made four appearances for the Altach reserves in the fourth-tier Vorarlbergliga, before he finally made his debut in the Bundesliga in August 2021, when he was in the starting eleven on the fifth matchday of that season against WSG Tirol.

On 20 June 2023, Mischitz moved on a season-long loan to Dornbirn.

== International career ==
Mischitz made his debut for Austria under-16s on 23 October 2018, starting a 4–1 friendly loss against Poland. He made his first appearance at under-17 level one year later in a friendly against Switzerland; he marked the occasion by scoring his team's only goal in a 4–1 loss.

He represented Austria at the 2022 UEFA European Under-19 Championship.

== Career statistics ==
As of match played 7 May 2022

Appearances and goals by club, season and competition
Club	Season	League			Austrian Cup		Other		Total	
Club	Season	Division	Apps	Goals	Apps	Goals	Apps	Goals	Apps	Goals
Rheindorf Altach	2021–22	Austrian Bundesliga	17	0	1	0	—		18	0
Career total			17	0	1	0	0	0	18	0
