= Robert Popa =

Romanian professional footballer

Personal information
- Full name: Dimitrie Robert Popa
- Date of birth: 5 March 2003 (age 23)
- Place of birth: Râmnicu Vâlcea, Romania
- Height: 1.90 m (6 ft 3 in)
- Position: Goalkeeper

Youth career
- –2018: SCM Râmnicu Vâlcea

Senior career*
Years	Team	Apps	(Gls)
2018–2020	Flacăra Horezu		
2019	→ Argeș Pitești (loan)	0	(0)
2020–2025	FC U Craiova	81	(0)
2024–2025	→ UTA Arad (loan)	16	(0)
2025–2026	Unirea Slobozia	13	(0)

International career^{‡}
2018	Romania U15	10	(0)
2018–2019	Romania U16	6	(0)
2019–2020	Romania U17	4	(0)
2022	Romania U19	5	(0)
2023–2024	Romania U20	6	(0)
2022–2024	Romania U21	1	(0)
- * Club domestic league appearances and goals as of 18 May 2026 ‡ National team caps and goals as of 26 March 2024

Dimitrie Robert Popa (born 5 March 2003) is a Romanian professional footballer who plays as a goalkeeper.

== Club career ==
Popa made his Liga I debut for FC U Craiova on 26 September 2021, in a 1–1 draw at Botoșani.

== Honours ==
FC U Craiova

- Liga II: 2020–21
