= Adam Griger =

Slovak footballer

Personal information
- Full name: Adam Griger
- Date of birth: 16 March 2004 (age 22)
- Place of birth: Prešov, Slovakia
- Height: 1.95 m (6 ft 5 in)
- Position: Forward

Team information
- Current team: Slovan Bratislava (on loan from Hradec Králové)
- Number: 30

Youth career
- 2012–2019: Tatran Prešov
- 2019–2020: Poprad
- 2020: Zemplín Michalovce

Senior career*
Years	Team	Apps	(Gls)
2020	Zemplín Michalovce	5	(0)
2021	LASK	5	(0)
2021–2023	→ Juniors OÖ (loan)	29	(4)
2022–2023	→ Cagliari (loan)	1	(0)
2023–2025	Granada B	23	(1)
2024–2025	→ Hradec Králové (loan)	22	(4)
2025–	Hradec Králové	19	(0)
2026–	→ Slovan Bratislava (loan)	15	(2)

International career^{‡}
2019	Slovakia U15	2	(0)
2020	Slovakia U16	3	(1)
2020	Slovakia U17	2	(0)
2021	Slovakia U18	2	(0)
2021–2022	Slovakia U19	20	(2)
2022–2023	Slovakia U20	4	(0)
2023–	Slovakia U21	14	(1)
- * Club domestic league appearances and goals as of 31 October 2026 ‡ National team caps and goals as of 27 March 2026

Adam Griger (born 16 March 2004) is a Slovak professional footballer who plays as a forward for Slovan Bratislava on loan from Hradec Králové.

== Club career ==
=== Zemplín Michalovce ===
Griger made his Fortuna Liga debut for Zemplín Michalovce against Spartak Trnava on 8 August 2020.

=== LASK ===
On 22 December 2020, he joined Linz-based LASK of the Austrian Bundesliga.

==== Loan to Cagliari ====
On 1 September 2022, Griger was loaned by Italian club Cagliari, with an option to buy. He was initially assigned to the club's Under-19 (Primavera) squad. He received his first call-up to the senior squad on 5 November 2022 for the game against Südtirol.

=== Granada ===
In September 2023, Griger signed for Club Recreativo Granada, the reserve side of Granada.

==== Loan to Hradec Králové ====
On 10 September 2024, Griger was loaned by Czech club Hradec Králové, with an option to buy.

=== Hradec Králové ===
On 30 April 2025, Griger signed a multi-year contract with Hradec Králové.

==== Loan to Slovan Bratislava ====
On 5 February 2026, Griger joined Slovan Bratislava on a one-year loan deal.

== International career ==
In December 2022, Griger was first recognised in a Slovak senior national team nomination and was immediately shortlisted by Francesco Calzona for prospective players' training camp at NTC Senec, even before his nomination for Slovak U21 feeder team.

Griger represented Slovakia at the 2022 UEFA European Under-19 Championship and the 2023 FIFA U-20 World Cup.

== Career statistics ==
As of match played 31 October 2026

Appearances and goals by club, season and competition
Club	Season	League			National cup		Europe		Total	
Club	Season	Division	Apps	Goals	Apps	Goals	Apps	Goals	Apps	Goals
Zemplín Michalovce	2020–21	Slovak First Football League	5	0	1	0	—		6	0
LASK	2020–21	Austrian Bundesliga	4	1	—		—		4	1
LASK	2021–22	Austrian Bundesliga	1	0	—		—		1	0
LASK	Total		5	0	—		—		5	0
Juniors OÖ (loan)	2020–21	2. Liga	4	0	—		—		4	0
Juniors OÖ (loan)	2021–22	2. Liga	23	3	—		—		23	3
Juniors OÖ (loan)	2022–23	Austrian Regionalliga Central	2	0	—		—		2	0
Juniors OÖ (loan)	Total		29	4	—		—		29	4
Cagliari (loan)	2022–23	Serie B	1	0	—		—		1	0
Granada B	2023–24	Primera Federación	23	1	—		—		23	1
Hradec Králové (loan)	2024–25	Czech First League	22	4	3	1	—		25	5
Hradec Králové	2025–26	Czech First League	19	0	—		—		19	0
Slovan Bratislava (loan)	2025–26	Slovak First Football League	7	0	0	0	—		7	0
Slovan Bratislava (loan)	2026–27	Slovak First Football League	8	2	1	0	0	0	9	2
Slovan Bratislava (loan)	Total		15	2	1	0	0	0	16	2
Career total			117	11	5	1	0	0	122	12
