= Bad call =

Informal sports term

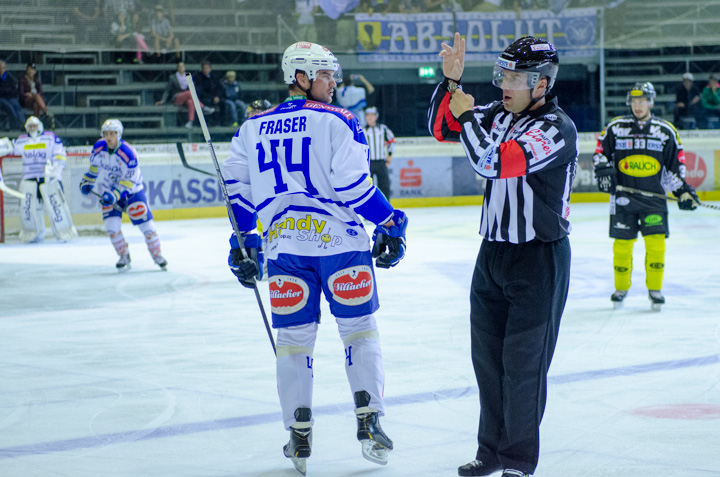
A hockey referee

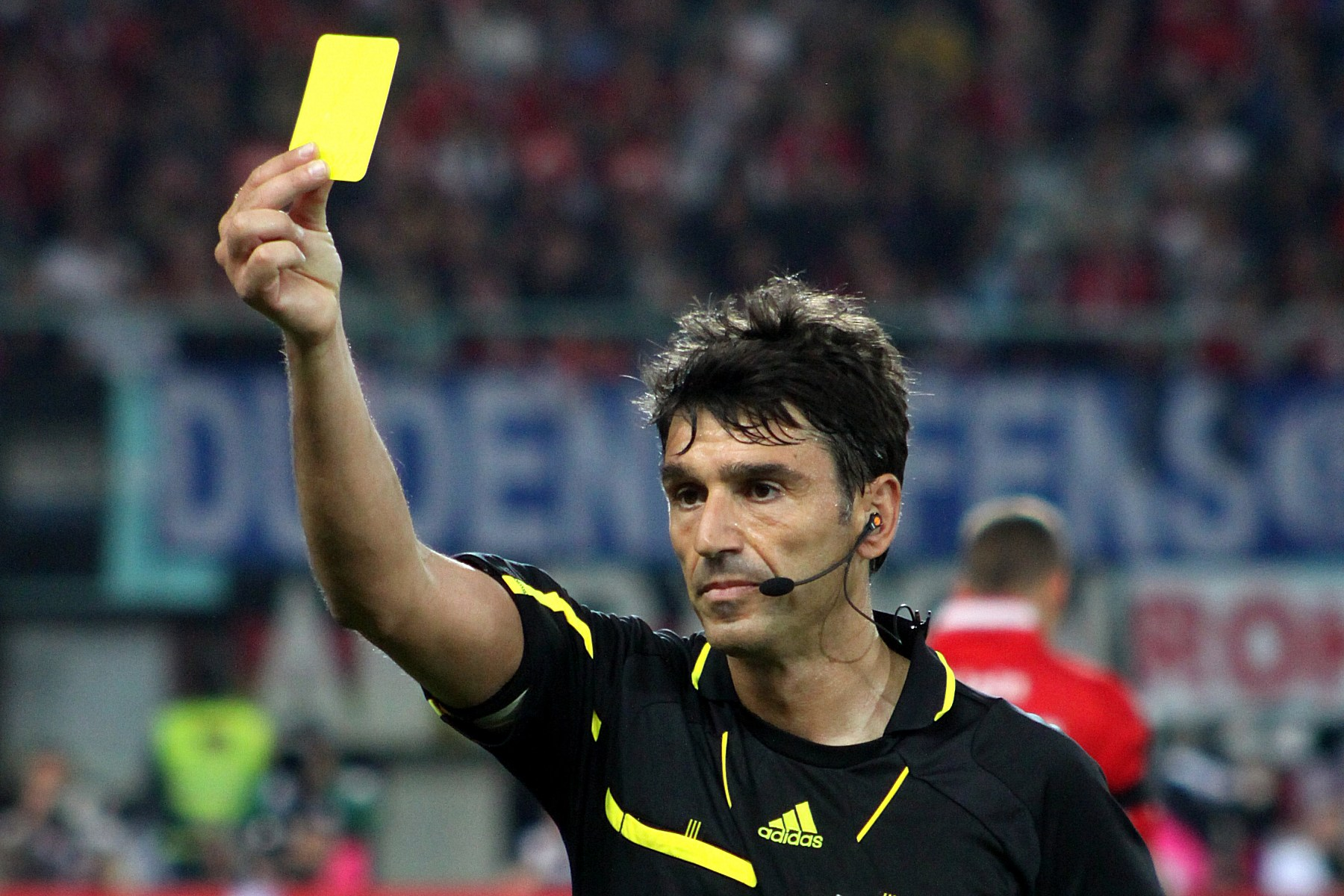
A soccer/football referee displaying a yellow card against a player

A "bad call" is an informal term used in sports to describe a referee decision, or "call", that is incorrect or perceived to be incorrect. Bad calls have been associated with all sports involving referees or judges.

A bad call is made by a game referee when:

1. An incorrect application of a game rule is made.
2. An incorrect interpretation of a specific game event is made.
3. An infraction of a game rule is unseen or ignored and the specific rule violation is left unaddressed.

Public outcry following a highly visible and questionable call might lead to a public clarification of existing rules or in rare instances, an actual change in rules.

Author Andrew Caruso notes that "Bad calls or bad breaks are part of every sport. That's life."

"Bad call" is used outside of sports colloquially to quickly label a bad decision: "His promotion was a bad call.", "He took her to dinner with his mom; bad call."

== Video review practices ==
Because of the accusations of bad calls involving plays in the National Football League, starting in 1986, the league began adopting rules to allow the use of instant replay in settling disputed calls by the on field officials. Other leagues (including Major League Baseball, FIFA, ULEB, and the NBA) have come up with differing systems to utilize video replay or to limit its usage.

The NFL did not innovate the process, rather they followed the lead of their competitor at the time - the USFL - which tried to differentiate itself from its more established rival by several rule differences, including the two-point conversion, a faster moving clock based on NCAA rules, and the use of replay when challenged by one of the teams.

== Compensation practices ==
Sports fans have frequently commented on what they perceive as "make-up" calls, in which referees compensate for a questionable call by penalizing the other team during the course of the game. One analysis focused on strikes and balls in baseball, finding that the zones shifted soon after what the authors refer to as errant calls.

== Notable examples ==
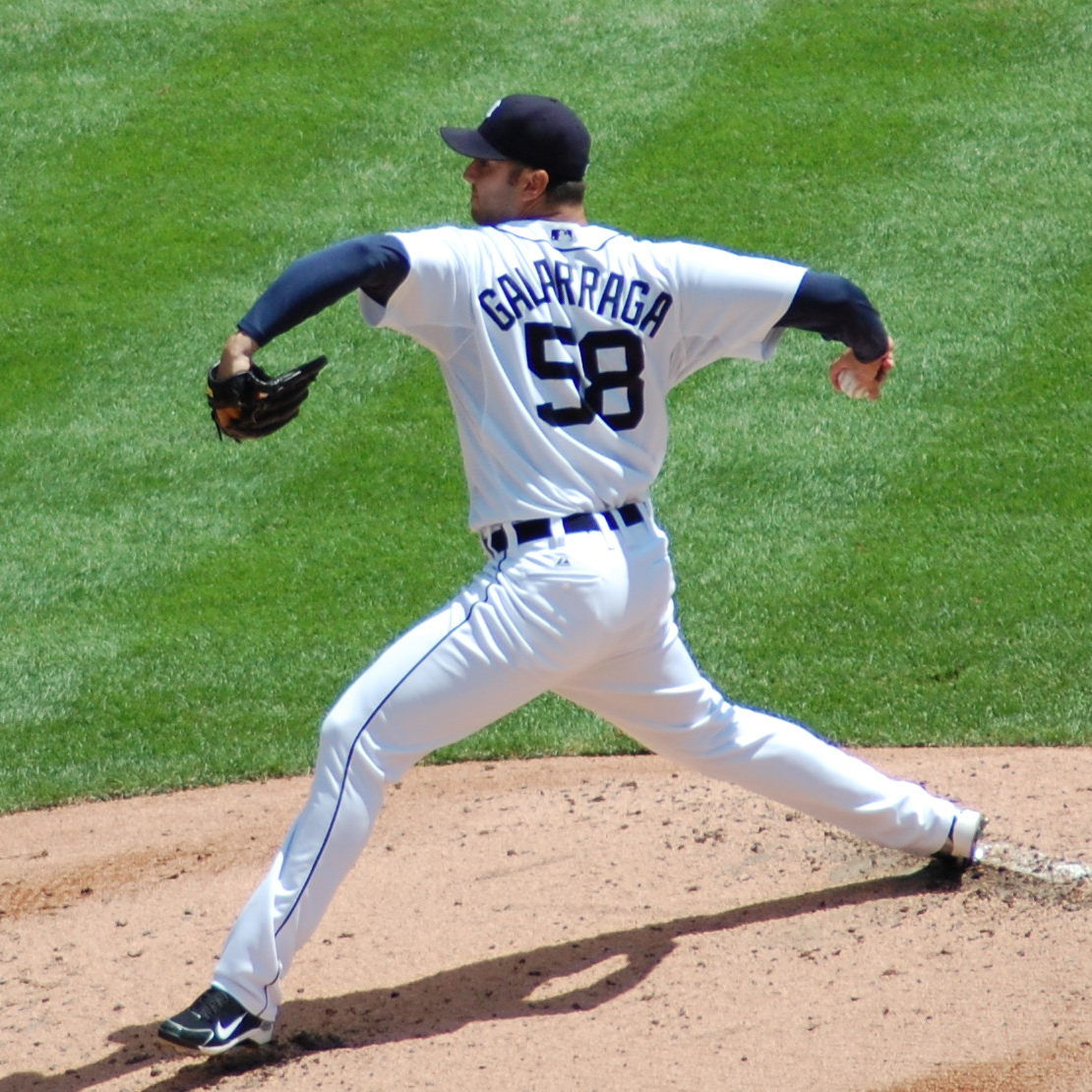
In 2010 Detroit Tigers pitcher Armando Galarraga was denied a perfect game when umpire Jim Joyce incorrectly called the 27th batter safe on a routine ground out.

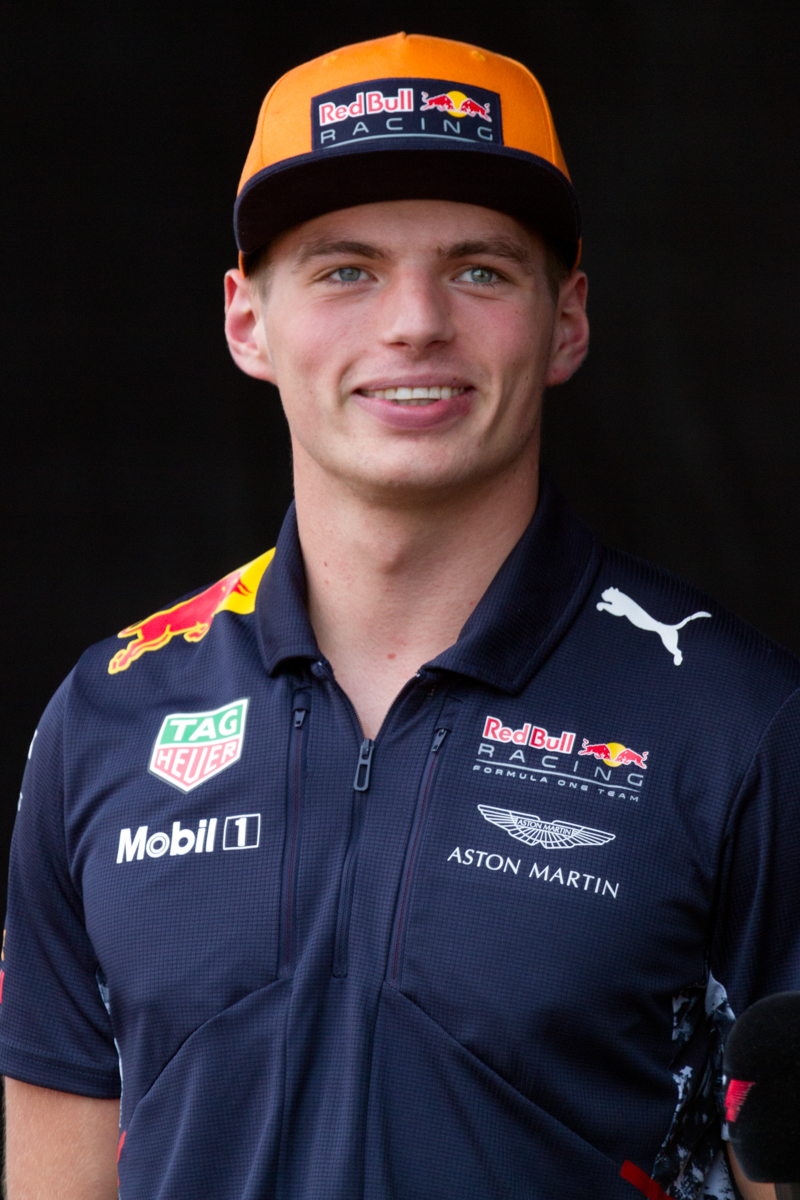
Max Verstappen won the 2021 Formula One World Championship after what the FIA admitted was a bad call by race director Michael Masi.

- At the 1961 Dixie 400, NASCAR made a bad call and declared Bunkie Blackburn the winner, after not counting one of David Pearson's laps. Most spectators had left before they gave the win to the correct person.
- At the 1972 Olympic Men's Basketball Final, the clock was reset to give the Soviet Union three opportunities to win the game over the previously undefeated United States basketball team. Team USA refused to accept the silver medal. Captain Kenny Davis has written into his will that his heirs cannot accept the silver medal on his behalf.
- In 1985, organ player Wilbur Snapp was ejected from a baseball game, after playing Three Blind Mice in response to what he saw as a bad call by the umpire.
- In the 1985 World Series, the St. Louis Cardinals lost to the Kansas City Royals, in part to a bad call made in Game 6. Umpire Don Denkinger called the Royals Jorge Orta safe when TV replays showed he was out. The Royals eventually would score 2 runs in the inning and win the game 2-1.
- In 1990, the University of Colorado was given five downs due to a counting error by the officials. Colorado beat the University of Missouri on the fifth down, the last play of the game.
- During the 1991 Philippine Basketball League season, a bad call during a game caused the fans to begin pelting the court, and the game was halted for 20 minutes.
- In the 1997 National League Championship Series Game 5, umpire Eric Gregg gave Florida Marlins pitcher Liván Hernández an unusually wide strike zone. Hernández set a record 15 strike outs against the Atlanta Braves throughout the game. The final out of the game came when Fred McGriff was called out on a pitch that TV replays showed was a foot outside of the strike zone.
- On June 2, 2010, when Detroit Tigers pitcher Armando Galarraga personally made the final out at first-base for his perfect game, umpire Jim Joyce incorrectly called the Cleveland Indian runner safe. Video of the play proved that Joyce was mistaken, and he later apologized to Galarraga, who won the game when the next batter grounded out.
- The 2021 Formula One World Championship was decided at the season-ending Abu Dhabi Grand Prix by a call by race director Michael Masi that allowed Red Bull's Max Verstappen to overtake Mercedes' Lewis Hamilton on the last lap to win the World Drivers' Championship. Hamilton and Verstappen had been level on points going into the race; Hamilton led the race until a late safety car period allowed the pack, including Verstappen in second, to bunch up behind Hamilton. An FIA inquiry reported that Masi acted in good faith but erred in applying the unlapping procedure prior to safety car restarts, which allowed Verstappen to overtake Hamilton on the last lap. The FIA confirmed the race results and that the results of the 2021 season remained valid after Mercedes failed to appeal to the FIA International Court of Appeal. Several analysts stated that Hamilton would have won the championship had Masi correctly applied the regulations.

== See also ==
- Referee
- Umpire abuse
