= Ola Johansson (footballer) =

Swedish footballer

Personal information
- Date of birth: 28 March 1975 (age 51)
- Place of birth: Sweden
- Height: 1.78 m (5 ft 10 in)
- Position: Striker

Senior career*
Years	Team	Apps	(Gls)
1998–2000	Västra Frölunda	42	(3)
- * Club domestic league appearances and goals

Ola Johansson (born 28 March 1975) is a Swedish former professional footballer who played as a striker for Västra Frölunda in the Allsvenskan. He also won three caps for the Sweden U21 team, helping them reach the quarter-finals of the 1998 UEFA European Under-21 Championship.
