= Carney Chukwuemeka =

Austrian footballer (born 2003)

Personal information
- Full name: Carney Chibueze Chukwuemeka
- Date of birth: 20 October 2003 (age 23)
- Place of birth: Vienna, Austria
- Height: 1.87 m (6 ft 2 in)
- Positions: Attacking midfielder; left winger

Team information
- Current team: Borussia Dortmund
- Number: 17

Youth career
- –2016: Northampton Town
- 2016–2021: Aston Villa

Senior career*
Years	Team	Apps	(Gls)
2021–2022	Aston Villa	14	(0)
2022–2025	Chelsea	23	(1)
2025	→ Borussia Dortmund (loan)	10	(1)
2025–	Borussia Dortmund	32	(2)

International career^{‡}
2019	England U17	2	(0)
2020–2021	England U18	3	(1)
2021–2022	England U19	13	(6)
2022–2023	England U20	7	(0)
2026–	Austria	9	(2)
Medal record
Men's football
Representing England
UEFA European Under-19 Championship
Winner	2022 Slovakia
- * Club domestic league appearances and goals as of 7 November 2026 ‡ National team caps and goals as of 1 October 2026

Carney Chibueze Chukwuemeka (Igbo pronunciation; born 20 October 2003) is an Austrian professional footballer who plays as an attacking midfielder or left winger for Bundesliga club Borussia Dortmund and the Austria national team. He represented England at the youth international level before switching allegiance to Austria.

A product of the Northampton Town and Aston Villa academies, Chukwuemeka made his debut for the latter club's first team in 2021, before signing for Chelsea in 2022. In 2025, he joined Borussia Dortmund in Germany, first on loan and then on a permanent deal.

Chukwuemeka represented England at youth level, including winning the 2022 UEFA European Under-19 Championship. In 2026, he committed to play for his birth country of Austria and was named in their 2026 FIFA World Cup squad.

== Club career ==
=== Aston Villa ===
Chukwuemeka joined the Aston Villa academy from the Northampton Town academy in March 2016. He signed his first professional contract with Villa in July 2020.

Chukwuemeka made his senior debut for the team on 19 May 2021 in a 2–1 away victory over Tottenham Hotspur, hitting the post within minutes of entering the game. On 23 May 2021, he was named Aston Villa Academy Player of the Season for the 2020–21 season. The following day, Chukwuemeka was part of the Aston Villa U18s squad that won the FA Youth Cup, beating Liverpool U18s 2–1 in the final.

Chukwuemeka made his first senior start on 24 August 2021 in a 6–0 victory against Barrow in the second round of the EFL Cup, and made his first league start four days later in a 1–1 draw with Brentford, a performance Paul Merson hailed as "outstanding", adding "he will be an absolute star".

=== Chelsea ===
On 2 August 2022, Aston Villa and Chelsea confirmed that the clubs had reached an agreement for the permanent transfer of Chukwuemeka, subject to the player agreeing personal terms and undergoing a medical. On 4 August 2022, Chelsea announced the signing of Chukwuemeka on a six-year contract. On 20 August 2023, Chukwuemeka scored his first senior goal in a 3–1 loss to West Ham United, and was later substituted after suffering a knee injury.

=== Borussia Dortmund ===
On 3 February 2025, Bundesliga club Borussia Dortmund signed Chukwuemeka on loan until the end of the season, with an option to make the move permanent. On 5 April, he netted his first goal for the club in a 4–1 away win over SC Freiburg. On 26 August, Chukwuemeka joined Borussia Dortmund on a permanent transfer. Later that year, on 1 October, he scored his first UEFA Champions League goal in a 4–1 win over Athletic Bilbao.

== International career ==
Chukwuemeka was eligible to play for the national teams of Austria, England, and Nigeria.

=== England (youth) ===
After making two appearances for England U17 national team, on 29 March 2021, he made his debut for the England U18 squad in 2–0 victory over Wales. On 2 September 2021, Chukwuemeka made his debut for the England U19s during a 2–0 victory over Italy U19s at St. George's Park, he also captained the side. On 10 November 2021, he scored his first goal at this level, in a 4–0 victory over Andorra U19 in a 2022 UEFA European Under-19 Championship qualification match.

On 17 June 2022, Chukwuemeka was named in the England squad for the 2022 UEFA European Under-19 Championship finals. Chukwuemeka featured in every game of their tournament, scoring in group stage victories against Austria and Serbia. On 1 July 2022, he scored the second goal in England's 3–1 extra time victory over Israel in the final. His performances during the competition led to his inclusion in the UEFA team of the tournament.

On 21 September 2022, Chukwuemeka made his England U20 debut during a 3–0 victory over Chile at the Pinatar Arena. On 10 May 2023, Chukwuemeka was included in the England squad for the 2023 FIFA U-20 World Cup. However, he didn't arrive at the tournament until after the group stages due to his club commitments. His only appearance of the tournament saw him start in their round of sixteen defeat against Italy.

In March 2024, Chukwuemeka received his first call-up to the England U21 squad for their matches against Azerbaijan and Luxembourg. However, he was unable to feature in either match as he withdrew from the squad due to a knock sustained while on international duty.

=== Austria (senior) ===
On 9 March 2026, Chukwuemeka's request to switch international allegiance to Austria was approved by FIFA. On 27 March 2026, he made his debut in a friendly in Vienna against Ghana, and scored his team's fourth goal in an eventual 5–1 victory. On 18 May 2026, Chukwuemeka was selected in Ralf Rangnick’s 26-man squad for the 2026 FIFA World Cup, marking Austria's first appearance in the tournament since 1998.

== Personal life ==
Chukwuemeka was born in Vienna, Austria, to Igbo Nigerian parents and was raised in Northampton, England. His older brother, Caleb, is also a professional footballer who came through the academy at Northampton Town and was previously on the books of Aston Villa. He attended St James CofE primary school in Northampton and then Northampton School for Boys with his brother.

== Career statistics ==
=== Club ===
As of match played 7 November 2026

Appearances and goals by club, season and competition
Club	Season	League			National cup (Note: Includes FA Cup, DFB-Pokal)		League cup (Note: Includes EFL Cup)		Europe		Other		Total	
Club	Season	Division	Apps	Goals	Apps	Goals	Apps	Goals	Apps	Goals	Apps	Goals	Apps	Goals
Aston Villa U21	2020–21	—			—		—		—		2 (Note: Appearances in EFL Trophy)	0	2	0
Aston Villa U21	2021–22	—			—		—		—		2	0	2	0
Aston Villa U21	Total		—		—		—		—		4	0	4	0
Aston Villa	2020–21	Premier League	2	0	0	0	0	0	—		—		2	0
Aston Villa	2021–22	Premier League	12	0	0	0	2	0	—		—		14	0
Aston Villa	Total		14	0	0	0	2	0	—		—		16	0
Chelsea	2022–23	Premier League	14	0	1	0	0	0	0	0	—		15	0
Chelsea	2023–24	Premier League	9	1	2	1	1	0	—		—		12	2
Chelsea	2024–25	Premier League	0	0	0	0	1	0	4 (Note: Appearances in UEFA Conference League)	0	—		5	0
Chelsea	Total		23	1	3	1	2	0	4	0	—		32	2
Borussia Dortmund (loan)	2024–25	Bundesliga	10	1	—		—		3 (Note: Appearances in UEFA Champions League)	0	4 (Note: Appearances in FIFA Club World Cup)	0	17	1
Borussia Dortmund	2025–26	Bundesliga	28	2	2	0	—		8	1	—		38	3
Borussia Dortmund	2026–27	Bundesliga	4	0	2	1	—		4	0	0	0	10	1
Borussia Dortmund	Dortmund total		42	3	4	1	—		15	1	4	0	65	5
Career total			79	4	7	2	4	0	19	1	8	0	117	7

=== International ===
As of match played 1 October 2026

Appearances and goals by national team and year
National team	Year	Apps	Goals
Austria	2026	9	2
Total		9	2

Austria score listed first, score column indicates score after each Chukwuemeka goal.

List of international goals scored by Chukwuemeka
No.	Date	Venue	Opponent	Score	Result	Competition
1.	27 March 2026	Ernst-Happel-Stadion, Vienna, Austria	Ghana	4–1	5–1	Friendly
2.	27 September 2026	Ernst-Happel-Stadion, Vienna, Austria	Kosovo	3–0	3–1	2026–27 UEFA Nations League B

== Honours ==
Aston Villa

- FA Youth Cup: 2020–21

England U19

- UEFA European Under-19 Championship: 2022

Individual

- UEFA European Under-19 Championship Team of the Tournament: 2022
- Aston Villa Academy Player of the Season: 2020–21
