= Giannis Dermitzakis =

Greek footballer

Personal information
- Full name: Ioannis Dermitzakis
- Date of birth: 5 November 1992 (age 34)
- Place of birth: Heraklion, Crete, Greece
- Height: 1.93 m (6 ft 4 in)
- Position: Goalkeeper

Youth career
- Ergotelis

Senior career*
Years	Team	Apps	(Gls)
2012–2016	Ergotelis	1	(0)
2016–2020	OFI	7	(0)
2021	Santorini	16	(0)
2021	Irodotos	2	(0)
- * Club domestic league appearances and goals as of 19 December 2021

Giannis Dermitzakis (Greek: Γιάννης Δερμιτζάκης; born 5 November 1992) is a Greek professional footballer who plays as a goalkeeper.
