= Aurelian Ciuciulete =

Romanian footballer

Personal information
- Full name: Aurelian Gabriel Ciuciulete
- Date of birth: 4 April 2003 (age 23)
- Place of birth: Craiova, Romania
- Height: 1.86 m (6 ft 1 in)
- Position: Midfielder

Team information
- Current team: Concordia Chiajna
- Number: 15

Youth career
- Dynamik Craiova
- –2021: FCSB

Senior career*
Years	Team	Apps	(Gls)
2021–2024	FCSB	1	(0)
2021–2022	→ Unirea Constanța (loan)	30	(0)
2023	→ Metaloglobus București (loan)	1	(0)
2023–2024	→ Unirea Dej (loan)	13	(0)
2024–	Concordia Chiajna	38	(2)

International career^{‡}
2021	Romania U18	2	(0)
2021–2022	Romania U19	3	(0)
2022–2024	Romania U20	10	(0)
- * Club domestic league appearances and goals as of 1 August 2026 ‡ National team caps and goals as of 26 March 2024

Aurelian Gabriel Ciuciulete (born 4 April 2003) is a Romanian professional footballer who plays as a midfielder for Liga II club Concordia Chiajna.

== Career statistics ==
As of match played 1 August 2026

Appearances and goals by club, season and competition
Club	Season	League			Cupa României		Europe		Other		Total	
Club	Season	Division	Apps	Goals	Apps	Goals	Apps	Goals	Apps	Goals	Apps	Goals
FCSB	2020–21	Liga I	1	0	—		—		—		1	0
Unirea Constanța (loan)	2021–22	Liga II	16	0	0	0	—		—		16	0
Unirea Constanța (loan)	2022–23	Liga II	14	0	0	0	—		—		14	0
Unirea Constanța (loan)	Total		30	0	0	0	—		—		30	0
Metaloglobus București (loan)	2022–23	Liga II	1	0	—		—		—		1	0
Unirea Dej (loan)	2023–24	Liga II	13	0	2	1	—		—		15	1
Concordia Chiajna	2024–25	Liga II	16	2	1	0	—		—		17	2
Concordia Chiajna	2025–26	Liga II	21	0	4	1	—		—		25	1
Concordia Chiajna	2026–27	Liga II	1	0	0	0	—		—		1	0
Concordia Chiajna	Total		38	2	5	1	—		—		43	3
Career total			83	2	7	2	—		—		90	4
