= Manolis Dermitzakis =

Greek footballer

Personal information
- Full name: Emmanouil Dermitzakis
- Date of birth: 24 November 1976 (age 49)
- Height: 1.80 m (5 ft 11 in)
- Position: Defender

Senior career*
Years	Team	Apps	(Gls)
1994–2005	OFI		
2005	PANO Malia		
2005–2006	AEK Larnaca		
2006–2007	OF Ierapetra		
2007–2009	Diagoras		

International career
1998	Greece U21	2	(0)
1999	Greece	2	(0)
1999	Greece B	1	(0)
- * Club domestic league appearances and goals

Manolis Dermitzakis (Greek: Μανώλης Δερμιτζάκης; born 24 November 1976) is a Greek retired football defender. He was a squad member at the 1998 UEFA European Under-21 Championship, where Greece became runners-up. In the next year he played against Mexico B and won two full international caps.
