= 2022 UEFA European Under-19 Championship =

Majstrovstvá Európy vo futbale hráčov do 19 rokov 2022

Tournament details
- Host country: Slovakia
- Dates: 18 June – 1 July
- Teams: 8 (from 1 confederation)
- Venue: 5 (in 5 host cities)

Final positions
- Champions: England (11th title)
- Runners-up: Israel

Tournament statistics
- Matches played: 16
- Goals scored: 51 (3.19 per match)
- Attendance: 38,555 (2,410 per match)
- Top scorer(s): (France) Loum Tchaouna (4 goals)

The 2022 UEFA European Under-19 Championship (also known as UEFA Under-19 Euro 2022) was the 19th edition of the UEFA European Under-19 Championship (69th edition if the Under-18 and Junior eras are included), the annual international youth football championship organised by UEFA for the men's under-19 national teams of Europe. Slovakia hosted the tournament between 18 June and 1 July 2022. A total of eight teams played in the tournament, with players born on or after 1 January 2003 eligible to participate.

Same as previous editions held in even-numbered years, the tournament acted as the UEFA qualifiers for the FIFA U-20 World Cup. The top five teams of the tournament qualified for the 2023 FIFA U-20 World Cup in Argentina as the UEFA representatives.

Spain were the defending champions, having won the last tournament held in 2019, with the 2020 and 2021 editions cancelled due to the COVID-19 pandemic in Europe and the title was not awarded. They were not able to defend the title after failing to qualify for the competition.

== Host selection ==
The timeline of host selection was as follows:

- 11 January 2019: bidding procedure launched
- 28 February 2019: deadline to express interest
- 27 March 2019: Announcement by UEFA that declaration of interest were received from 17 member associations to host one of the UEFA national team youth final tournaments (UEFA European Under-19 Championship, UEFA Women's Under-19 Championship, UEFA European Under-17 Championship, UEFA Women's Under-17 Championship) in 2021 and 2022 (although it was not specified which association were interested in which tournament)
- 28 June 2019: Submission of bid dossiers
- 24 September 2019: Selection of successful host associations by the UEFA Executive Committee at its meeting in Ljubljana

For the UEFA European Under-19 Championship final tournaments of 2021 and 2022, Romania and Slovakia were selected as hosts respectively.

== Qualification ==
The UEFA Executive Committee originally decided on 29 May 2019 to test a new qualifying format for the Under-19 Championship in 2022 and 2023. The qualifying competition would have been played in four rounds over a two-year period from autumn 2020 to spring 2022, with teams divided into three leagues, and promotion and relegation between leagues after each round similar to the UEFA Nations League. However, on 17 June 2020, UEFA announced that the introduction of the new format had been postponed to the 2023 edition due to the COVID-19 pandemic in Europe, and qualification for the 2022 edition would use the previous format involving two rounds only.

A total of 54 (out of 55) UEFA nations entered the competition, and with the hosts Slovakia qualifying automatically, the other 53 teams will compete in the qualifying competition, which consisted of two rounds: the Qualifying round, which took place in autumn 2021, and the Elite round, which took place in spring 2022, to determine the remaining seven spots in the final tournament. The draw for the qualifying round was held on 9 December 2020, 10:30 CET (UTC+1), at the UEFA headquarters in Nyon, Switzerland.

=== Qualified teams ===
The following teams qualified for the final tournament.

Note: All appearance statistics include only U-19 era (since 2002).

Team	Method of qualification	Appearance	Last appearance	Previous best performance
Slovakia	Hosts	2nd	2002	Third place (2002)
Israel	Elite round Group 1 winners	2nd	2014	Group stage (2014)
France	Elite round Group 2 winners	12th	2019	Champions (2005, 2010, 2016)
England	Elite round Group 3 winners	11th	2018	Champions (2017)
Romania	Elite round Group 4 winners	2nd	2011	Group stage (2011)
Italy	Elite round Group 5 winners	8th	2019	Champions (2003)
Serbia	Elite round Group 6 winners	8th	2014	Champions (2013)
Austria	Elite round Group 7 winners	8th	2016	Semi-finals (2003, 2006, 2014)

== Venues ==
Trnava	Dunajská Streda	Banská Bystrica
City Aréna - Štadión Antona Malatinského	DAC Aréna	Štiavničky - Štadión SNP
Capacity: 19,200	Capacity: 12,700	Capacity: 7,900
Žiar nad Hronom	2022 UEFA European Under-19 Championship is located in Slovakia	
Mestský štadión Žiar nad Hronom	2022 UEFA European Under-19 Championship is located in Slovakia	
Capacity: 2,309	2022 UEFA European Under-19 Championship is located in Slovakia	
Senec	2022 UEFA European Under-19 Championship is located in Slovakia	
NTC Senec	2022 UEFA European Under-19 Championship is located in Slovakia	
Capacity: 3,264	2022 UEFA European Under-19 Championship is located in Slovakia	

== Match officials ==
The following officials were appointed for the final tournament:

Referees

- (Belgium) Nathan Verboomen
- (Denmark) Morten Krogh
- (Georgia (country)) Goga Kikacheishvili
- (Lithuania) Manfredas Lukjančukas
- (Malta) Matthew De Gabriele
- (Portugal) António Nobre

Assistant referees

- (Belgium) Mathias Hillaert
- (Bulgaria) Deniz Sokolov
- (Denmark) Steffen Beck Bramsen
- (Finland) Turkka Joonas Valjakka
- (Georgia (country)) Davit Gabisonia
- (Lithuania) Edgaras Bučinskas
- (Malta) Luke Portelli
- (Portugal) Pedro Martins

Fourth officials

- (Hungary) Gergő Bogár
- (Sweden) Adam Ladebäck

== Group stage ==
The final tournament schedule was announced on 28 April 2022.

The group winners and runners-up advanced to the semi-finals and qualify for the 2023 FIFA U-20 World Cup.

=== Group A ===
Pos	Team	Pld	W	D	L	GF	GA	GD	Pts	Qualification
1	France	3	3	0	0	11	2	+9	9	Knockout stage and 2023 FIFA U-20 World Cup
2	Italy	3	2	0	1	4	5	−1	6	Knockout stage and 2023 FIFA U-20 World Cup
3	Slovakia (H)	3	1	0	2	1	6	−5	3	FIFA U-20 World Cup play-off
4	Romania	3	0	0	3	2	5	−3	0	

Source: UEFA
(H) Hosts
18 June 2022
17:30

Slovakia	0–5	France
	Report	Tchaouna 16'; Bonny 34', 59'; Virginius 57', 62'

Anton Malatinský Stadium, Trnava
Attendance: 5,238
Referee: Morten Krogh (Denmark)
18 June 2022
20:00

Italy	2–1	Romania
Baldanzi 47'; Volpato 68'	Report	Andronache 53'

DAC Aréna, Dunajská Streda
Attendance: 1,327
Referee: Nathan Verboomen (Belgium)

21 June 2022
17:30

Slovakia	0–1	Italy
	Report	Ambrosino 33'

Anton Malatinský Stadium, Trnava
Attendance: 8,235
Referee: Goga Kikacheishvili (Georgia)
21 June 2022
20:00

Romania	1–2	France
Coubiș 82'	Report	Tchaouna 12'; Adeline 20'

DAC Aréna, Dunajská Streda
Attendance: 869
Referee: Matthew De Gabriele (Malta)

24 June 2022
17:30

Romania	0–1	Slovakia
	Report	Griger 90+5'

Anton Malatinský Stadium, Trnava
Attendance: 3,485
Referee: Manfredas Lukjančukas (Lithuania)
24 June 2022
17:30

France	4–1	Italy
Da Silva 24'; Tchaouna 37', 69'; Arconte 79'	Report	Volpato 16'

DAC Aréna, Dunajská Streda
Attendance: 2,137
Referee: António Nobre (Portugal)

=== Group B ===
Pos	Team	Pld	W	D	L	GF	GA	GD	Pts	Qualification
1	England	3	3	0	0	7	0	+7	9	Knockout stage and 2023 FIFA U-20 World Cup
2	Israel	3	1	1	1	6	5	+1	4	Knockout stage and 2023 FIFA U-20 World Cup
3	Austria	3	1	0	2	5	8	−3	3	FIFA U-20 World Cup play-off
4	Serbia	3	0	1	2	4	9	−5	1	

Source: UEFA
19 June 2022
17:30

Serbia	2–2	Israel
Lazetić 8'; Leković 90+3'	Report	Gloukh 16'; Ibrahim 74'

Mestský štadión, Žiar nad Hronom
Attendance: 945
Referee: António Nobre (Portugal)
19 June 2022
20:00

England	2–0	Austria
Chukwuemeka 43'; Devine 65'	Report

Štadión SNP, Banská Bystrica
Attendance: 1,537
Referee: Manfredas Lukjančukas (Lithuania)

22 June 2022
17:30

Israel	4–2	Austria
Abed 5'; Lugasi 29'; Madmon 52' (pen.); Gloukh 54'	Report	Jasic 24'; Demir 76'

Mestský štadión, Žiar nad Hronom
Attendance: 1,026
Referee: Nathan Verboomen (Belgium)
22 June 2022
20:00

England	4–0	Serbia
Scarlett 5', 40'; Chukwuemeka 68'; Jebbison 90+1'	Report

Štadión SNP, Banská Bystrica
Attendance: 2,569
Referee: Morten Krogh (Denmark)

25 June 2022
20:00

Israel	0–1	England
	Report	Delap 6'

Mestský štadión, Žiar nad Hronom
Attendance: 933
Referee: Goga Kikacheishvili (Georgia)
25 June 2022
20:00

Austria	3–2	Serbia
Querfeld 25', 55'; Wallner 66'	Report	Lazetić 44'; Ratkov 88'

Štadión SNP, Banská Bystrica
Attendance: 1,129
Referee: Matthew De Gabriele (Malta)

== Knockout stage ==
=== Bracket ===
Semi-finals
28 June – DAC Aréna
France	1
Israel	2
28 June – NTC Senec
England	2
Italy	1

Final
1 July – Anton Malatinský Stadium
Israel	1
England (a.e.t.)	3

World Cup play-off
28 June – Anton Malatinský Stadium
Slovakia	1
Austria	0

=== FIFA U-20 World Cup play-off ===
Winners qualified for the 2023 FIFA U-20 World Cup.

28 June 2022
17:00

Slovakia	1–0	Austria
Kopásek 64'	Report

Anton Malatinský Stadium, Trnava
Attendance: 4,087
Referee: Nathan Verboomen (Belgium)

=== Semi-finals ===
28 June 2022
17:00

England	2–1	Italy
Scott 58'; Quansah 82'	Report	Miretti 12' (pen.)

NTC Senec, Senec
Attendance: 897
Referee: Goga Kikacheishvili (Georgia)

28 June 2022
20:00

France	1–2	Israel
Virginius 62'	Report	Touré 29' (o.g.); Kancepolsky 57'

DAC Aréna, Dunajská Streda
Attendance: 1,226
Referee: Morten Krogh (Denmark)

=== Final ===
1 July 2022
20:00

Israel	1–3 (a.e.t.)	England
Gloukh 40'	Report	Doyle 52'; Chukwuemeka 108'; Ramsey 116'

Anton Malatinský Stadium, Trnava
Attendance: 3,005
Referee: António Nobre (Portugal)

== Goalscorers ==
There were 51 goals scored in 16 matches, for an average of 3.19 goals per match.

4 goals

- (France) Loum Tchaouna

3 goals

- (England) Carney Chukwuemeka
- (France) Alan Virginius
- (Israel) Oscar Gloukh

2 goals

- (Austria) Leopold Querfeld
- (England) Dane Scarlett
- (France) Ange-Yoan Bonny
- (Italy) Cristian Volpato
- (Serbia) Marko Lazetić

1 goal

- (Austria) Yusuf Demir
- (Austria) Adis Jasic
- (Austria) Lukas Wallner
- (England) Liam Delap
- (England) Alfie Devine
- (England) Callum Doyle
- (England) Daniel Jebbison
- (England) Jarell Quansah
- (England) Aaron Ramsey
- (England) Alex Scott
- (France) Martin Adeline
- (France) Taïryk Arconte
- (France) Florent Da Silva
- (Israel) Tai Abed
- (Israel) Ahmed Ibrahim
- (Israel) El Yam Kancepolsky
- (Israel) Ariel Lugasi
- (Israel) Ilay Madmon
- (Italy) Giuseppe Ambrosino
- (Italy) Tommaso Baldanzi
- (Italy) Fabio Miretti
- (Romania) Luca Andronache
- (Romania) Andrei Coubiș
- (Serbia) Stefan Leković
- (Serbia) Petar Ratkov
- (Slovakia) Adam Griger
- (Slovakia) Samuel Kopásek

1 own goal

- (France) Souleymane Isaak Touré

Source: UEFA

== Team of the tournament ==
The UEFA Technical Observer team announced the team of the tournament.

Goalkeeper	Defenders	Midfielders	Forwards
(England) Matthew Cox	(France) Brayann Pereira; (Israel) Stav Lemkin; (England) Jarell Quansah; (England) Harvey Vale	(Israel) Ilay Madmon; (England) Carney Chukwuemeka; (Israel) Oscar Gloukh	(France) Loum Tchaouna; (Italy) Giuseppe Ambrosino; (France) Alan Virginius

== Qualified teams for FIFA U-20 World Cup ==
The following five teams from UEFA qualified for the 2023 FIFA U-20 World Cup in Argentina.

Team	Qualified on	Previous appearances in FIFA U-20 World Cup^{1}
Italy	21 June 2022	7 (1977, 1981, 1987, 2005, 2009, 2017, 2019)
France	21 June 2022	7 (1977, 1997, 2001, 2011, **2013**, 2017, 2019)
England	22 June 2022	11 (1981, 1985, 1991, 1993, 1997, 1999, 2003, 2009, 2011, 2013, **2017**)
Israel	25 June 2022	0 (debut)
Slovakia	28 June 2022	1 (2003)

^{1} Bold indicates champions for that year. Italic indicates hosts for that year.

== Sponsors ==
- Adidas
- Slovnaft
- DEMI Šport
- Oxyworld
- Lucka
