= 2007 OFC U-20 Championship squads =

Leading football players aged under 20 represented nations of Oceania in the 2007 season of the OFC U-20 Championship.

== New Zealand ==
Coach: (New Zealand) Stu Jacobs

No.	Pos.	Player	Date of birth (age)	Caps	Club
1	GK	Jacob Spoonley	3 March 1987 (aged 19)	6	(New Zealand) Wellington Phoenix
2	DF	Sam Peters	20 July 1989 (aged 17)	0	(New Zealand) Team Wellington
3	DF	Ian Hogg	15 December 1989 (aged 17)	0	(New Zealand) Auckland City FC
4	MF	Cole Peverley	3 July 1988 (aged 18)		(New Zealand) Hawke's Bay United
5	DF	Jack Pelter	30 July 1987 (aged 19)		(New Zealand) Canterbury United
6	DF	Phil Edington	8 February 1987 (aged 19)		
7	MF	Craig Henderson	24 June 1987 (aged 19)		(United States) Dartmouth College
8	MF	Chris James	4 July 1987 (aged 19)		(England) Fulham FC
9	FW	Jeremy Brockie	7 October 1987 (aged 19)		(Australia) Sydney FC
10	MF	Leo Shin	19 March 1988 (aged 18)		(New Zealand) Waitakere United
11	FW	Sam Jenkins	17 February 1987 (aged 19)		(New Zealand) Hawke's Bay United
12	MF	Nick Roydhouse			
13	MF	Michael Cunningham			(New Zealand) Otago United
14	DF	Michael Boxall	18 August 1988 (aged 18)		(United States) UC Santa Barbara
15	MF	Dan Keat (captain)	28 September 1987 (aged 19)		(United States) Dartmouth College
16	DF	Rodney Brown			
17	DF	Tim Schaeffers	14 May 1987 (aged 19)		(New Zealand) Waikato FC
18	FW	Kayne Vincent	29 October 1988 (aged 18)		(Japan) Cerezo Osaka
19	MF	Kieran Purcell	27 April 1988 (aged 18)		
20	GK	Rhys Keane			

== Fiji ==
Coach: Juan Carlos Buzzetti

No.	Pos.	Player	Date of birth (age)	Caps	Club
1	GK	Ben Mateiqaqara			
2	DF	Ratu Semi Dileqa			
3	MF	Solomoni Nulevu			
4	DF	Paulo Posiano			
5	DF	Krishna Sami			
6		Daniel Krishneel			
7	FW	Alvin Singh			
8		Malakai Waqa			
9	MF	Kelepi Qaqa			
10		Risheel Dass			
11	FW	Roy Krishna			
12		Esava Naqeleca			
13		Maleli Nakalavo			
14		Meneusi Senibuli			
15		Eran Underwood			
16		Laitia Tuilau			
17	DF	Samuela Kautoga			
18	DF	Epeli Deama			
19	MF	Rinal Prasad			
20	GK	Vereti Dickson			

== Solomon Islands ==
Coach:

No.	Pos.	Player	Date of birth (age)	Caps	Club

== New Caledonia ==
Coach:

No.	Pos.	Player	Date of birth (age)	Caps	Club

== Tahiti ==
Coach:

No.	Pos.	Player	Date of birth (age)	Caps	Club

== Vanuatu ==
Coach:

No.	Pos.	Player	Date of birth (age)	Caps	Club

== Samoa ==
Coach:

No.	Pos.	Player	Date of birth (age)	Caps	Club
