= 2018 OFC U-19 Championship squads =

The 2018 OFC U-19 Championship was the 22nd edition of the OFC U-19/U-20 Championship. Before the tournament in 2016, the age limit was reduced by a year to 19 years of age. However, the last tournament remained the name U-20 Championship. For this tournament, the name has changed to U-19 Championship. So, players who wanted to participate in the tournament needed to be born on or after 1 January 1999.

== Qualifying stage ==
=== Cook Islands ===
Head coach: Alan Taylor

No.	Pos.	Player	Date of birth (age)	Caps	Goals	Club

=== American Samoa ===
Head coach: Tunoa Lui

No.	Pos.	Player	Date of birth (age)	Caps	Goals	Club

=== Tonga ===
Head coach: Soane Malia

No.	Pos.	Player	Date of birth (age)	Caps	Goals	Club

=== Samoa ===
Head coach: Valerio Raccuglia

No.	Pos.	Player	Date of birth (age)	Caps	Goals	Club

== Group A ==
=== New Zealand ===
Head coach: (England) Des Buckingham

No.	Pos.	Player	Date of birth (age)	Caps	Goals	Club
1	GK	Cameron Brown	9 July 1999 (age 26)			(New Zealand Football) Waitemata
12	GK	Zac Jones	27 November 2000 (age 25)			(New Zealand Football) Wellington Phoenix
2	DF	Jordan Spain	5 March 2000 (age 26)			(New Zealand Football) Cashmere Technical
3	DF	Dino Botica	8 July 1999 (age 26)			(New Zealand Football) Bay Olympic
5	DF	Robert Tipelu	9 October 1999 (age 26)			(New Zealand Football) Onehunga Sports
17	DF	Boyd Curry	6 March 2001 (age 25)			(New Zealand Football) Onehunga Sports
4	MF	Joe Bell	27 April 1999 (age 26)			(United States Soccer Federation) Virginia Cavaliers
6	MF	Dane Schnell	14 May 1999 (age 26)			(New Zealand Football) Western Springs
8	MF	Trevor Zwetsloot	16 October 1999 (age 26)			(German Football Association) Werder Bremen
11	MF	Willem Ebbinge	6 January 2001 (age 25)			(New Zealand Football) Wellington Phoenix
15	MF	Callan Elliot	7 July 1999 (age 26)			(New Zealand Football) Wairarapa United
16	MF	Leon Van Den Hoven	20 April 2000 (age 25)			(New Zealand Football) Eastern Suburbs
18	MF	Kingsley Sinclair	25 February 2001 (age 25)			(New Zealand Football) Eastern Suburbs
19	MF	Oliver Whyte	20 January 2000 (age 26)			(New Zealand Football) Wellington Phoenix
7	FW	Matthew Conroy	1 April 2001 (age 25)			(New Zealand Football) Western Springs
9	FW	Max Mata	10 July 2000 (age 25)			(New Zealand Football) Onehunga Sports
10	FW	Charles Spragg	1 March 2000 (age 26)			(New Zealand Football) Eastern Suburbs
14	FW	Jorge Akers	3 March 2000 (age 26)			(New Zealand Football) Havelock North Wanderers

=== Tahiti ===
Head coach: (French Polynesia) Bruno Tehaamoana

No.	Pos.	Player	Date of birth (age)	Caps	Goals	Club
16	GK	Tevaerai Tamatai	15 January 2001 (age 25)			(Tahitian Football Federation) AS Vénus Mahina
23	GK	Moana Pito	25 January 2000 (age 26)			(Tahitian Football Federation) AS Tefana
2	DF	Antonio Fiu	18 March 1999 (age 27)			(French Football Federation) Universite P. Sabatier
3	DF	Hennel Tehaamoana	12 April 1999 (age 26)			(Tahitian Football Federation) AS Dragon
5	DF	Purutu Nanuaiterai	7 September 1999 (age 26)			(Tahitian Football Federation) AS Tefana
11	DF	Mauri Heitaa	31 July 1999 (age 26)			(Tahitian Football Federation) AS Vénus Mahina
15	DF	Hauragi Huri	7 March 1999 (age 27)			(Tahitian Football Federation) AS Vénus Mahina
18	DF	Samuel Liparo	2 October 1999 (age 26)			(French Football Federation) US Concarneau
19	DF	Orirau Teiho	25 June 2000 (age 25)			(Tahitian Football Federation) AS Pirae
4	MF	Kavai'ei Morgant	8 October 2001 (age 24)			(French Football Federation) Trélissac FC
6	MF	Terai Bremond	16 May 2001 (age 24)			(French Football Federation) Toulouse FC
8	MF	Yann Vivi	7 June 2000 (age 25)			(Tahitian Football Federation) A.S. Jeunes Tahitiens
9	MF	Eddy Kaspard	27 May 2001 (age 24)			(French Football Federation) Trélissac FC
10	MF	Roonui Tehau	15 December 1999 (age 26)			(Tahitian Football Federation) AS Vénus Mahina
12	MF	Hugo Boube	24 November 1999 (age 26)			(Tahitian Football Federation) A.S. Jeunes Tahitiens
13	MF	Keali'i Wong	7 June 1999 (age 26)			(French Football Federation) AS Erstein
20	MF	Ariimana Taaroamea	25 June 2000 (age 25)			(Tahitian Football Federation) A.S. Arue
7	FW	Ramanui Amau	9 June 2000 (age 25)			(Tahitian Football Federation) AS Vénus Mahina
14	FW	Tutehau Tufariua	31 January 2000 (age 26)			(Tahitian Football Federation) A.S. Taiarapu
17	FW	Rainui Nordman	9 February 1999 (age 27)			(Tahitian Football Federation) A.S. Jeunes Tahitiens

=== Papua New Guinea ===
Head coach: (Papua New Guinea) Harrison Kamake

No.	Pos.	Player	Date of birth (age)	Caps	Goals	Club
20	GK	Graham Berigami				(Papua New Guinea Football Association) Besta PNG United
1	GK	Baxter Morris				(Papua New Guinea Football Association) Besta PNG United
17	DF	Dopson Noi				(Papua New Guinea Football Association) Besta PNG United
3	DF	Kimson Kapai				(Papua New Guinea Football Association) Besta PNG United
5	DF	Freeman Giwi				(Papua New Guinea Football Association) Besta PNG United
4	DF	Sylvester Luke				(Papua New Guinea Football Association) Toti City Dwellers FC
15	DF	Dinniget Luaine				(Papua New Guinea Football Association) Besta PNG United
10	MF	Obert Simon				(Papua New Guinea Football Association) Besta PNG United
7	MF	Emmanuel Simongi				(Papua New Guinea Football Association) Besta PNG United
6	MF	Ricky Wadunah				(Papua New Guinea Football Association) Besta PNG United
11	MF	Yagi Yasasa				(Papua New Guinea Football Association) Besta PNG United
2	MF	Laventine Munuo				(Papua New Guinea Football Association) Southern Strikers
16	FW	Jonathan Allen				(Papua New Guinea Football Association) Besta PNG United
9	FW	Barthy Kerobin				(Papua New Guinea Football Association) Besta PNG United
13	FW	Cameron Nuabi				(Papua New Guinea Football Association) Southern Strikers
8	FW	Stahl Gubag	17 July 1999 (age 26)			(Papua New Guinea Football Association) Madang Fox
18	FW	Wolfram Gregory				(Papua New Guinea Football Association) Besta PNG United
19	FW	Abraham Allen				(Papua New Guinea Football Association) Besta PNG United

=== Tonga ===
Head coach: Soane Malia

No.	Pos.	Player	Date of birth (age)	Caps	Goals	Club
1	GK	Semisi Otukolo				
2	DF	Petueli Tototaha				
3	DF	Sione Tuifangaloka				
4	DF	Ofa Kite				
5	DF	Tevita Vakatapu				
6	MF	Vai Lutu				
7	MF	Tuia Falepapalangi				
8	MF	Kalakaua Faivailo				
9		Tevita Kau				
10		Mohammad Rajani				
11		Viliami Tukia				

== Group B ==
=== Solomon Islands ===
Head coach:

No.	Pos.	Player	Date of birth (age)	Caps	Goals	Club

=== New Caledonia ===
Head coach:

No.	Pos.	Player	Date of birth (age)	Caps	Goals	Club

=== Fiji ===
Head coach:

No.	Pos.	Player	Date of birth (age)	Caps	Goals	Club

=== Vanuatu ===
Head coach:

No.	Pos.	Player	Date of birth (age)	Caps	Goals	Club
