= 2018 OFC U-19 Championship =

Championnat d'Océanie de football des moins de 19 ans 2018

Tournament details
- Host countries: Qualifying stage: Cook Islands; Final tournament: Tahiti
- Dates: Qualifying stage: 26 May – 1 June 2018; Final tournament: 5–18 August 2018
- Teams: Final tournament: 8 Total: 11 (from 1 confederation)
- Venues: 3 (in 2 host cities)

Final positions
- Champions: New Zealand (7th title)
- Runners-up: Tahiti
- Third place: New Caledonia
- Fourth place: Solomon Islands

Tournament statistics
- Matches played: 22
- Goals scored: 82 (3.73 per match)
- Attendance: 12,000 (545 per match)
- Top scorer: (New Zealand) Max Mata (5 goals)
- Best player: (New Zealand) Joe Bell
- Best goalkeeper: (French Polynesia) Moana Pito

The 2018 OFC U-19 Championship was the 22nd edition of the OFC U-19/U-20 Championship, the biennial international youth football championship organised by the Oceania Football Confederation (OFC) for the men's under-19/under-20 national teams of Oceania. The qualifying stage was held in the Cook Islands between 26 May – 1 June 2018, and the final tournament was held in Tahiti between 5–18 August 2018.

Before the tournament in 2016, the age limit was reduced by a year to 19 years of age. However, the last tournament remained the name U-20 Championship. For this tournament, the name has changed to U-19 Championship. So, players who wanted to participate in the tournament needed to be born on or after 1 January 1999. At an OFC Executive Committee meeting held at its Auckland headquarters in November 2013 the competition format was modified. The competition was brought forward a year and the age limit was lowered to 19 years of age. The changes were made in order to allow the winner of the competition plenty of time for preparation and player development for upcoming World Cups at Under 20 level.

In March 2015, FIFA decided that the OFC gets two slots at every FIFA U-20 and U-17 World Cup. So, the top two teams of the tournament qualified for the 2019 FIFA U-20 World Cup in Poland as the OFC representatives. New Zealand, the defending champions, won the title for the seventh time, and qualified together with runners-up Tahiti.

== Format ==
The tournament structure was as follows:

- Qualifying stage: The four teams from the "developing associations" (American Samoa, Cook Islands, Samoa and Tonga) played in the qualifying stage. The winner of the round-robin tournament qualify for the final tournament.
- Final tournament: A total of eight teams (Fiji, New Caledonia, New Zealand, Papua New Guinea, Solomon Islands, Tahiti, Vanuatu, and the qualifying stage winner) played in the final tournament. For the group stage, they were divided into two groups of four teams. The top two teams of each group advance to the knockout stage (semi-finals and final) to decide the winner of the OFC U-19 Championship and the two teams that qualify for the FIFA U-20 World Cup.

The draw for the tournament was held on 2 February 2018 at the OFC Headquarters in Auckland, New Zealand. In both the qualifying stage and the final tournament, the hosts (Cook Islands and Tahiti) were assigned to position A1 in the draw, while the remaining teams were drawn into the other positions without any seeding.

== Teams ==
All 11 FIFA-affiliated national teams from the OFC entered the tournament.

Note: All appearance statistics include those in the qualifying stage (since 2016).

| Team | Stage | Appearance | Previous best performance |
|---|---|---|---|
| Fiji | Final tournament (Group stage) | 21st | Champions (2014) |
| New Caledonia | Final tournament (Group stage) | 12th | Runners-up (2008) |
| New Zealand | Final tournament (Group stage) | 21st | Champions (1980, 1992, 2007, 2011, 2013, 2016) |
| Papua New Guinea | Final tournament (Group stage) | 14th | Fourth place (1978, 1982) |
| Solomon Islands | Final tournament (Group stage) | 9th | Runners-up (2005, 2011) |
| Tahiti (hosts) | Final tournament (Group stage) | 11th | Champions (1974, 2008) |
| Vanuatu | Final tournament (Group stage) | 15th | Runners-up (2014, 2016) |
| American Samoa | Qualifying stage | 5th | Group stage (1998, 2011, 2014) |
| Cook Islands (hosts) | Qualifying stage | 3rd | Group stage (2001, 2016) |
| Samoa | Qualifying stage | 9th | Group stage (1988, 1994, 1998, 2001, 2002, 2005, 2007) |
| Tonga | Qualifying stage | 6th | Group stage (1998, 2001, 2002, 2005) |

== Venues ==
The hosts of the qualifying stage and final tournament were announced by OFC on 31 October 2017.

- The qualifying stage was played at the CIFA Academy Field in Rarotonga, Cook Islands.
- The final tournament was played at the Stade Pater and Stade Fautaua in Pirae, Tahiti.

After two Group B matches were played at Stade Fautaua on 6 August, it was announced on 8 August that the remaining Group B matches would be moved to Stade Pater due to the floodlights being deemed less than optimal. However, it was announced on 10 August 2018 that after heavy rain caused the pitch of Stade Pater to deteriorate, the last two Group A and Group B matches on 11 and 12 August would be moved to Stade Fautaua with earlier kick-off times (12:00 and 15:00 instead of 15:00 and 18:00).

| Cook Islands | Tahiti | |
| Rarotonga | Pirae | |
|---|---|---|
| CIFA Academy Field | Stade Pater Te Hono Nui | Stade Fautaua |
| Capacity: 1,000 | Capacity: 11,700 | Capacity: 5,000 |
| 2018 OFC U-19 Championship is located in Cook Islands | 2018 OFC U-19 Championship is located in French Polynesia | |

== Squads ==
Players born on or after 1 January 1999 are eligible to compete in the tournament. Each team can name a maximum of 20 players.

== Qualifying stage ==
The winner advance to the final tournament (group stage).

All times are local, CKT (UTC−10).

| Pos | Team | Pld | W | D | L | GF | GA | GD | Pts | Qualification |
|---|---|---|---|---|---|---|---|---|---|---|
| 1 | Tonga | 3 | 2 | 1 | 0 | 6 | 1 | +5 | 7 | Final tournament (Group stage) |
| 2 | Samoa | 3 | 2 | 1 | 0 | 5 | 1 | +4 | 7 | |
| 3 | Cook Islands (H) | 3 | 1 | 0 | 2 | 2 | 5 | −3 | 3 | |
| 4 | American Samoa | 3 | 0 | 0 | 3 | 1 | 7 | −6 | 0 | |

Source: OFC
(H) Hosts
26 May 2018
13:30

| American Samoa | 0−3 | Samoa |
|---|---|---|
| | Report | Smith 77', 81', 90+3' |

CIFA Academy Field, Rarotonga
Attendance: 100
Referee: Robinson Banga (Vanuatu)
26 May 2018
16:30

| Tonga | 3−0 | Cook Islands |
|---|---|---|
| Kau 17'; Rajani 24' (pen.), 38' (pen.) | Report |

CIFA Academy Field, Rarotonga
Attendance: 250
Referee: Cory Mills (New Zealand)

29 May 2018
13:30

| Tonga | 2–0 | American Samoa |
|---|---|---|
| Namoa 7', 50' | Report |

CIFA Academy Field, Rarotonga
Attendance: 25
Referee: David Yareboinen (Papua New Guinea)
29 May 2018
16:30

| Cook Islands | 0–1 | Samoa |
|---|---|---|
| | Report | Malo 78' |

CIFA Academy Field, Rarotonga
Attendance: 250
Referee: Kader Zitouni (Tahiti)

1 June 2018
13:30

| Samoa | 1–1 | Tonga |
|---|---|---|
| Malo 8' | Report | Falepapalangi 66' |

CIFA Academy Field, Rarotonga
Attendance: 125
Referee: Cory Mills (New Zealand)
1 June 2018
16:30

| Cook Islands | 2–1 | American Samoa |
|---|---|---|
| Paio 37'; Tiputoa 49' (pen.) | Report | Ledoux 51' |

CIFA Academy Field, Rarotonga
Attendance: 250
Referee: Ben Aukwai (Solomon Islands)

== Group stage ==
The top two teams of each group advanced to the semi-finals.

All times are local, TAHT (UTC−10).

=== Group A ===
| Pos | Team | Pld | W | D | L | GF | GA | GD | Pts | Qualification |
|---|---|---|---|---|---|---|---|---|---|---|
| 1 | New Zealand | 3 | 3 | 0 | 0 | 20 | 1 | +19 | 9 | Knockout stage |
| 2 | Tahiti (H) | 3 | 2 | 0 | 1 | 9 | 2 | +7 | 6 | Knockout stage |
| 3 | Papua New Guinea | 3 | 1 | 0 | 2 | 4 | 10 | −6 | 3 | |
| 4 | Tonga | 3 | 0 | 0 | 3 | 0 | 20 | −20 | 0 | |

Source: OFC
(H) Hosts
5 August 2018
15:00

| Tonga | 0–4 | Papua New Guinea |
|---|---|---|
| | Report | J. Allen 45+1'; Kerobin 66'; A. Allen 72', 90+4' |

Stade Pater, Pirae
Attendance: 500
Referee: Joel Hopken (Vanuatu)
5 August 2018
18:00

| New Zealand | 2–1 | Tahiti |
|---|---|---|
| Mata 54' (pen.); Spragg 61' | Report | Kaspard 64' |

Stade Pater, Pirae
Attendance: 2,000
Referee: George Time (Solomon Islands)

8 August 2018
15:00

| New Zealand | 14–0 | Tonga |
|---|---|---|
| Tipelu 15'; Schnell 36', 68'; Joe Bell 38', 41', 42'; Whyte 46', 47', 89'; Spragg 54', 57', 88'; Spain 56'; Curry 78' | Report |

Stade Pater, Pirae
Attendance: 300
Referee: Salesh Chand (Fiji)
8 August 2018
18:00

| Tahiti | 6–0 | Papua New Guinea |
|---|---|---|
| Bremond 2', 32'; Tehau 17', 86'; Vivi 45+1'; Kaspard 71' | Report |

Stade Pater, Pirae
Attendance: 1,500
Referee: George Time (Solomon Islands)

11 August 2018
12:00

| Papua New Guinea | 0–4 | New Zealand |
|---|---|---|
| | Report | Mata 47' (pen.), 57' (pen.), 88'; Conroy 67' |

Stade Fautaua, Pirae
Attendance: 200
Referee: Joel Hopken (Vanuatu)
11 August 2018
15:00

| Tahiti | 2–0 | Tonga |
|---|---|---|
| Nordman 45+4'; Morgant 51' | Report |

Stade Fautaua, Pirae
Attendance: 500
Referee: Robinson Banga (Vanuatu)

=== Group B ===
| Pos | Team | Pld | W | D | L | GF | GA | GD | Pts | Qualification |
|---|---|---|---|---|---|---|---|---|---|---|
| 1 | Solomon Islands | 3 | 3 | 0 | 0 | 5 | 2 | +3 | 9 | Knockout stage |
| 2 | New Caledonia | 3 | 1 | 1 | 1 | 11 | 5 | +6 | 4 | Knockout stage |
| 3 | Fiji | 3 | 1 | 1 | 1 | 4 | 3 | +1 | 4 | |
| 4 | Vanuatu | 3 | 0 | 0 | 3 | 2 | 12 | −10 | 0 | |

Source: OFC
6 August 2018
15:00

| New Caledonia | 2–3 | Solomon Islands |
|---|---|---|
| Drawilo 23' (pen.), 77' (pen.) | Report | Houairia 41'; Taroga 56' (pen.); Bitaud 72' (o.g.) |

Stade Fautaua, Pirae
Attendance: 200
Referee: Norbert Hauata (Tahiti)
6 August 2018
18:00

| Vanuatu | 1–3 | Fiji |
|---|---|---|
| Tasip 80' (pen.) | Report | Dau 45+2'; Vodowaqa 54'; Sami 90+2' |

Stade Fautaua, Pirae
Attendance: 300
Referee: Campbell-Kirk Waugh (New Zealand)

9 August 2018
15:00

| Solomon Islands | 1–0 | Fiji |
|---|---|---|
| Maeobia 89' | Report |

Stade Pater, Pirae
Attendance: 200
Referee: David Yareboinen (Papua New Guinea)
9 August 2018
18:00

| New Caledonia | 8–1 | Vanuatu |
|---|---|---|
| Gope-Fenepej 13', 53'; Bako 23'; Rawor 49' (o.g.); Richard 60', 63'; Wawia 68'; Longue 88' | Report | Peli 84' |

Stade Pater, Pirae
Attendance: 300
Referee: Kader Zitouni (Tahiti)

12 August 2018
12:00

| Solomon Islands | 1–0 | Vanuatu |
|---|---|---|
| Taroga 15' | Report |

Stade Fautaua, Pirae
Attendance: 150
Referee: Kader Zitouni (Tahiti)
12 August 2018
15:00

| Fiji | 1–1 | New Caledonia |
|---|---|---|
| Dau 45+2' | Report | Drawilo 63' |

Stade Fautaua, Pirae
Attendance: 250
Referee: Nick Waldron (New Zealand)

== Knockout stage ==
=== Bracket ===
Semi-finals
15 August – Pirae
New Zealand | 2
New Caledonia | 1
15 August – Pirae
Solomon Islands | 1
Tahiti | 3

Final
18 August – Pirae
New Zealand | 1
Tahiti | 0
Third place
17 August – Pirae
New Caledonia | 4
Solomon Islands | 1

=== Semi-finals ===
Winners qualify for 2019 FIFA U-20 World Cup.

15 August 2018
15:00

| New Zealand | 2–1 | New Caledonia |
|---|---|---|
| Mata 55'; Ebbinge 76' | Report | Mata 41' (o.g.) |

Stade Pater, Pirae
Attendance: 1,000
Referee: Kader Zitouni (Tahiti)

15 August 2018
18:30

| Solomon Islands | 1–3 | Tahiti |
|---|---|---|
| Mekawir 80' | Report | Tehau 45+3'; Nordman 74'; Kaspard 78' |

Stade Pater, Pirae
Attendance: 2,000
Referee: Campbell-Kirk Waugh (New Zealand)

=== Third place match ===
17 August 2018 (Note: The third place match was originally scheduled to be played on 18 August, 15:00, but was rescheduled to 17 August, 18:00, in order to accommodate travel arrangements.)
18:00

| New Caledonia | 4–1 | Solomon Islands |
|---|---|---|
| Wenisso 30'; Katrawa 71'; Longue 75'; Bako 89' | Report | Wawane 81' |

Stade Pater, Pirae
Attendance: 100
Referee: Nick Waldron (New Zealand)

=== Final ===
18 August 2018
18:00

| New Zealand | 1–0 | Tahiti |
|---|---|---|
| Zwetsloot 50' | Report |

Stade Pater, Pirae
Attendance: 1,500
Referee: David Yareboinen (Papua New Guinea)

== Winners ==
2018 OFC U-19 Championship

New Zealand
Seventh title

== Goalscorers ==
In the qualifying stage there were 14 goals scored in 6 matches, for an average of 2.33 goals per match. In the final tournament there were 68 goals scored in 16 matches, for an average of 4.25 goals per match. In total, there were 82 goals scored in 22 matches, for an average of 3.73 goals per match.

5 goals

- (New Zealand) Max Mata

4 goals

- (New Zealand) Charles Spragg

3 goals

- (New Caledonia) Cyril Drawilo
- (New Zealand) Joe Bell
- (New Zealand) Oliver Whyte
- (Samoa) Henry Smith (in qualifying)
- (French Polynesia) Eddy Kaspard
- (French Polynesia) Roonui Tehau

2 goals

- (Fiji) Ratu Dau
- (New Caledonia) Paul Gope-Fenepej
- (New Caledonia) Pierre Bako
- (New Caledonia) Vita Longue
- (New Caledonia) Titouan Richard
- (New Zealand) Dane Schnell
- (Papua New Guinea) Abraham Allen
- (Samoa) Samuelu Malo (in qualifying)
- (Solomon Islands) Patrick Taroga
- (French Polynesia) Terai Bremond
- (French Polynesia) Rainui Nordman
- (Tonga) Atunaisa Namoa (in qualifying)
- (Tonga) Mohammad Rajani (in qualifying)

1 goal

- (American Samoa) Roy Ledoux (in qualifying)
- (Cook Islands) Teokotai Paio (in qualifying)
- (Cook Islands) Conroy Tiputoa (in qualifying)
- (Fiji) Kishan Sami
- (Fiji) Tito Vodowaqa
- (New Caledonia) Jean-Jacques Katrawa
- (New Caledonia) Pierre Wawia
- (New Caledonia) Raoul Wenisso
- (New Zealand) Boyd Curry
- (New Zealand) Matthew Conroy
- (New Zealand) Willem Ebbinge
- (New Zealand) Jordan Spain
- (New Zealand) Robert Tipelu
- (New Zealand) Trevor Zwetsloot
- (Papua New Guinea) Jonathan Allen
- (Papua New Guinea) Barthy Kerobin
- (Solomon Islands) Lino Houairia
- (Solomon Islands) Tuita Maeobia
- (Solomon Islands) Ali Mekawir
- (Solomon Islands) Absolom Wawane
- (French Polynesia) Kavai'ei Morgant
- (French Polynesia) Yann Vivi
- (Tonga) Tuia Falepapalangi (in qualifying)
- (Tonga) Tevita Kau (in qualifying)
- (Vanuatu) Anthony Peli
- (Vanuatu) Jordy Tasip

1 own goal

- (New Caledonia) Lucas Bitaud (playing against Solomon Islands)
- (New Zealand) Max Mata (playing against New Caledonia)
- (Vanuatu) Nelsin Rawor (playing against New Caledonia)

== Awards ==
The Golden Ball Award was awarded to the most outstanding player of the tournament. The Golden Glove Award was awarded to the best goalkeeper of the tournament. The Golden Boot Award was awarded to the top scorer of the tournament. The Fair Play Award was awarded to the team with the best disciplinary record at the tournament.

| Award | Recipient |
|---|---|
| Golden Ball | (New Zealand) Joe Bell |
| Golden Glove | (French Polynesia) Moana Pito |
| Golden Boot | (New Zealand) Max Mata |
| Fair Play Award | |

== Qualified teams for FIFA U-20 World Cup ==
The following two teams from OFC qualified for the 2019 FIFA U-20 World Cup.

| Team | Qualified on | Previous appearances in FIFA U-20 World Cup^{1} |
|---|---|---|
| New Zealand | 15 August 2018 | 5 (2007, 2011, 2013, 2015, 2017) |
| Tahiti | 15 August 2018 | 1 (2009) |

^{1} Bold indicates champions for that year. Italic indicates hosts for that year.
