= 2024 OFC U-19 Men's Championship =

2024 OFC U-19 siamupini

Tournament details
- Host countries: Qualifying stage: Vanuatu; Final tournament: Samoa
- Dates: Qualifying stage: 9–15 April 2024; Final tournament: 5–18 July 2024
- Teams: Final tournament: 8 Total: 11 (from 1 confederation)
- Venue: 1 (in 1 host city)

Final positions
- Champions: New Zealand (9th title)
- Runners-up: New Caledonia
- Third place: Solomon Islands
- Fourth place: Fiji

Tournament statistics
- Matches played: 16
- Goals scored: 61 (3.81 per match)
- Attendance: 4,350 (272 per match)
- Top scorer(s): (New Zealand) Keegan Kelly (4 goals)
- Best player: (New Zealand) Luka Coveny
- Best goalkeeper: (New Zealand) Alby Kelly-Heald
- Fair play award: New Zealand

The 2024 OFC U-19 Men's Championship was the 24th edition of the OFC U-19/U-20 Championship, the biennial international youth football championship organised by the Oceania Football Confederation (OFC) for the men's under-19/under-20 national teams of Oceania.

The top two teams of the tournament qualified for the 2025 FIFA U-20 World Cup in Chile as the OFC representatives. New Zealand were the defending champions.

== Teams ==
All 11 FIFA-affiliated national teams from the OFC are eligible to enter the tournament.

Starting from 2022, this marked the return of the four-team qualifying stage after absent from 2022.

Note: All appearance statistics include those in the qualifying stage (2016 and 2018).

Team	Stage	Appearance	Previous best performance
Fiji	Final tournament (Group stage)	23rd	Champions (2014)
New Zealand	Final tournament (Group stage)	23rd	Champions (1980, 1992, 2007, 2011, 2013, 2016, 2018, 2022)
New Caledonia	Final tournament (Group stage)	14th	Runners-up (2008)
Papua New Guinea	Final tournament (Group stage)	16th	Fourth place (1978, 1982)
Samoa (hosts)	Final tournament (Group stage)	11th	Quarter-finals (2022)
Solomon Islands	Final tournament (Group stage)	11th	Runners-up (2005, 2011)
Tahiti	Final tournament (Group stage)	13th	Champions (1974, 2008)
American Samoa	Qualifying stage	7th	Group stage (1998, 2011, 2014)
Cook Islands	Qualifying stage	5th	Group stage (2001, 2016)
Tonga	Qualifying stage	8th	Group stage (1998, 2001, 2002, 2005, 2018)
Vanuatu	Qualifying stage	17th	Runners-up (2014, 2016)

== Venues ==
Samoa
Apia
FFS Football Stadium
Capacity: 3,500
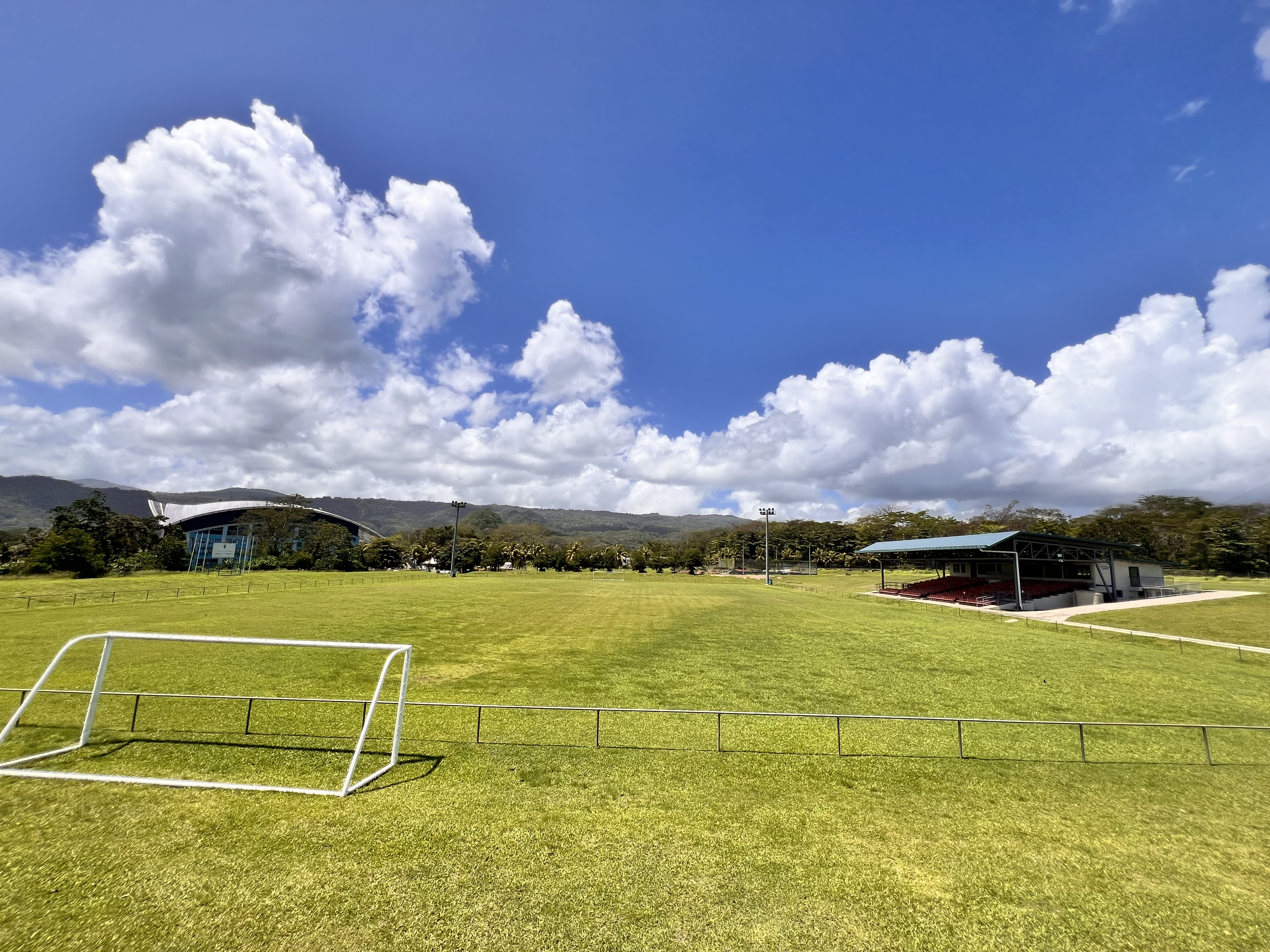

== Draw ==
The draw for the group stage was held on 5 March with teams seeded into pots based upon their ranking at the 2022 OFC U-19 Championship.

Pot 1	Pot 2	Pot 3
Fiji; New Zealand	New Caledonia; Samoa; Solomon Islands; Tahiti	Papua New Guinea; Vanuatu (Note: The identity of the qualifying winners was not known at the time of the final draw)

== Squads ==
Players born on or after 1 January 2005 are eligible to compete in the tournament.

== Qualifying stage ==
The draw for the group stage was held 5 March 2024.

=== Tiebreakers ===
Tie-breaking criteria for group play
The ranking of teams in the group stage was determined as follows:
1. Total points;
2. Goal difference in all group matches;
3. Goals scored in all group matches;
4. Head-to-head result between tied teams;
  1. Points in matches among the tied teams;
  2. Goal difference in matches among the tied teams;
  3. Goals scored in matches among the tied teams;
5. Fair play points in all group matches (only one deduction per player, per match):
  - One yellow card: −1 point;
  - Two yellow cards (indirect red card): −3 points;
  - Direct red card: −4 points;
  - Yellow card and direct red card: −5 points;
6. Drawing of lots.

=== Qualifying group ===
Pos	Team	Pld	W	D	L	GF	GA	GD	Pts	Qualification	(Vanuatu)	(Cook Islands)	(Tonga)	(American Samoa)
1	Vanuatu (H)	3	3	0	0	9	0	+9	9	Qualify for Final tournament	—	—	—	4–0
2	Cook Islands	3	1	1	1	4	5	−1	4		0–2	—	—	—
3	Tonga	3	1	1	1	5	7	−2	4		0–3	1–1	—	—
4	American Samoa	3	0	0	3	5	11	−6	0		—	2–3	3–4	—

Source: OFC
(H) Hosts

== Group stage ==
All times are local, WST (UTC+13).

=== Group A ===
Pos	Team	Pld	W	D	L	GF	GA	GD	Pts	Qualification
1	Solomon Islands	3	3	0	0	5	0	+5	9	Knockout stage
2	Fiji	3	2	0	1	9	5	+4	6	Knockout stage
3	Tahiti	3	1	0	2	2	4	−2	3	5th place match
4	Vanuatu	3	0	0	3	1	8	−7	0	7th place match

Source: OFC
5 July 2024
12:00

Fiji	3–1	Tahiti
Prasad 45+1'; Penisoni Tirau 45+6', 48'	Report	Bennett 20'

FFS Football Stadium, Apia
Attendance: 200
Referee: Calvin Berg (New Zealand)
5 July 2024
15:00

Solomon Islands	1–0	Vanuatu
Laena 17'	Report

FFS Football Stadium, Apia
Attendance: 200
Referee: David Yareboinen (Papua New Guinea)

8 July 2024
12:00

Fiji	0–3	Solomon Islands
	Report	Afi 35'; Abana 45+4', 83'

FFS Football Stadium, Apia
Attendance: 150
Referee: Cory Mills (New Zealand)
8 July 2024
15:00

Vanuatu	0–1	Tahiti
	Report	Papaura 67'

FFS Football Stadium, Apia
Attendance: 150
Referee: Gerard Ionatana (Solomon Islands)

11 July 2024
12:00

Vanuatu	1–6	Fiji
Maki 4'	Report	Tirau 13'; Afazal 25', 29'; Vasconcellos 35', 61'; Khan 90+5'

FFS Football Stadium, Apia
Attendance: 150
Referee: Keith Kitumbing (Papua New Guinea)
11 July 2024
15:00

Tahiti	0–1	Solomon Islands
	Report	Laena 52'

FFS Football Stadium, Apia
Attendance: 150
Referee: Calvin Berg (New Zealand)

=== Group B ===
Pos	Team	Pld	W	D	L	GF	GA	GD	Pts	Qualification
1	New Zealand	3	3	0	0	18	0	+18	9	Knockout stage
2	New Caledonia	3	2	0	1	4	5	−1	6	Knockout stage
3	Samoa	3	1	0	2	4	8	−4	3	5th place match
4	Papua New Guinea	3	0	0	3	2	15	−13	0	7th place match

Source: OFC
6 July 2024
12:00

New Zealand	3–0	New Caledonia
Ukich 18' (pen.); Watson 45+5'; Kelly 53'	Report

FFS Football Stadium, Apia
Attendance: 250
Referee: Veer Singh (Fiji)
6 July 2024
15:00

Samoa	3–1	Papua New Guinea
Trainor 38, 47'; Gobbi 82'	Report	Moses 50'

FFS Football Stadium, Apia
Attendance: 500
Referee: Timothy Niu (Solomon Islands)

9 July 2024
12:00

Papua New Guinea	1–2	New Caledonia
Sagana 83'	Report	Qaeze 45+1'; Simone 89'

FFS Football Stadium, Apia
Attendance: 150
Referee: Veer Singh (Fiji)
9 July 2024
15:00

New Zealand	5–0	Samoa
Phoenix 14', 59'; Gillion 36'; Partridge 74'; Brown 90' (o.g.)	Report

FFS Football Stadium, Apia
Attendance: 500
Referee: Kavitesh Behari (Fiji)

12 July 2024
12:00

Papua New Guinea	0–10	New Zealand
	Report	Sloane-Rodrigues 5', 26'; Makowem 11', 16'; Kelly 18', 58', 71'; Walker 67'; Ukich 75'; Watson 88'

FFS Football Stadium, Apia
Attendance: 300
Referee: Timothy Niu (Solomon Islands)
12 July 2024
15:00

New Caledonia	2–1	Samoa
Upa 41'; Brunet 45+3'	Report	Vaitusi 16'

FFS Football Stadium, Apia
Attendance: 500
Referee: Kavitesh Behari (Fiji)

== 5th place match ==
16 July 2024

Tahiti	4–0	Samoa
Teriitematau 32'; Papaura 53'; Brown 84' (o.g.); Faure 90'	Report

FFS Football Stadium, Apia
Attendance: 250
Referee: Timothy Niu (Solomon Islands)

== 7th place match ==
16 July 2024

Vanuatu	3–2	Papua New Guinea
Thomas 18', 43'; Numake 78'	Report	Moses 22'; Natou 37' (o.g.)

FFS Football Stadium, Apia
Attendance: 150
Referee: Kavitesh Behari (Fiji)

== Knockout stage ==
=== Bracket ===
Semi-finals
15 July – Apia
Solomon Islands	2
New Caledonia (a.e.t.)	3
15 July – Apia
New Zealand	1
Fiji	0

Final
18 July – Apia
New Caledonia	0
New Zealand	4
Third place match
18 July – Apia
Solomon Islands	4
Fiji	2

=== Semi-finals ===
Winners qualify for 2025 FIFA U-20 World Cup.

15 July 2024
11:00

Solomon Islands	2–3 (a.e.t.)	New Caledonia
Iro 37'; Abana 45'	Report	Qaeze 27', 118'; Simane 88'

FFS Football Stadium, Apia
Attendance: 200
Referee: Cory Mills (New Zealand)
15 July 2024
15:00

New Zealand	1–0	Fiji
Watson 48'	Report

FFS Football Stadium, Apia
Attendance: 300
Referee: David Yareboinen (Papua New Guinea)

=== Third place match ===
18 July 2024
11:00

Solomon Islands	4–2	Fiji
Francis 48', 65', 90+3'; Zopoa 83'	Report	Khan 53' (pen.); Rioa 88' (o.g.)

FFS Football Stadium, Apia
Attendance: 150
Referee: Gerard Ionatana (Samoa)

=== Final ===
18 July 2024
14:00

New Caledonia	0–4	New Zealand
	Report	Candy 37'; Supyk 64', 67' (pen.); Bulkeley 74'

FFS Football Stadium, Apia
Attendance: 500
Referee: Veer Singh (Fiji)

== Qualified teams for FIFA U-20 World Cup ==
The following two teams from OFC qualify for the 2025 FIFA U-20 World Cup in Chile.

Team	Qualified on	Previous appearances in FIFA U-20 World Cup^{1}
New Caledonia	15 July 2024	0 (debut)
New Zealand	15 July 2024	7 (2007, 2011, 2013, 2015, 2017, 2019, 2023)

^{1} Bold indicates champions for that year. Italic indicates hosts for that year.

== Broadcasting ==
All games were streamed live and free on FIFA+.
