= Joel Bartley =

Samoan footballer (born 2005)

Personal information
- Full name: Joel Rudy Bartley
- Date of birth: 13 April 2005 (age 21)
- Place of birth: Sydney, Australia
- Position: Goalkeeper

Team information
- Current team: Camden Tigers

Youth career
- 2020: Sydney FC

Senior career*
Years	Team	Apps	(Gls)
2022	Sydney United 58		
2023–2024	Bonnyrigg White Eagles		
2025–	Camden Tigers		

International career
2022–2024	Samoa U19		
2023	Samoa U23	3	(0)
2023–	Samoa	7	(0)
- * Club domestic league appearances and goals

Joel Rudy Bartley (born 13 April 2005) is a footballer who currently plays as a goalkeeper for Football NSW Division 2 side Camden Tigers. Born in Australia, he represents the Samoa national team.

== Career ==
In 2022, Bartley was called up to represent the Samoa under-19 national team at the 2022 OFC U-19 Championship in Tahiti. He later represented them again at the 2024 OFC U-19 Men's Championship.

In September 2023, he represented the Samoa under-23 national team during the 2023 OFC Men's Olympic Qualifying Tournament. Later that year, Bartley made his debut for the Samoa national team at the 2023 Pacific Games, where he made three appearances. In 2024, he was called up to Samoa's squad for the 2024 OFC Men's Nations Cup, where he made four appearances, including two during qualification and two in the group stage.
