= MY F.C. =

Sports management app

MY F.C. is a freemium app designed to organise and administer football teams. It is developed by MY F.C. Limited, a private company headquartered in Auckland, New Zealand. The app allows users to build a team by adding players and from there they can create trainings and matches, keep up with relevant news in the curated newsfeed, record statistics both individually and team based, follow the games live in the match-centre. The app also features integrated lineup builder with custom team kits.

== History ==
Founders Sam Jenkins, Mike Simpson and Sam Jasper started MY F.C. in 2015 to help them "run their football lives". The app was launched on Android and iOS on 14 February 2017.

== Accolades ==
MY F.C. won the first place prize at Bank of New Zealand Start-up Alley 2017 competition that aims to discover New Zealand start-ups who are doing innovative work and ready to establish themselves as long-term, sustainable businesses. The prize package included $15,000 and a trip to San Francisco.
