= Samoa national under-20 football team =

Men's under 20 football team of Samoa

Samoa U20
- Association: Football Federation Samoa
- Confederation: OFC (Oceania)
- Head coach: (New Zealand) Matt Calcott
- Captain: Kyah Cahill
- Most caps: Samuelu Malo (6)
- Top scorer: Pago Tunupopo; Samuelu Malo (4)
- FIFA code: SAM
First colours	Second colours

First international
- Western Samoa 0–5 Papua New Guinea (Suva, Fiji; 3 September 1988)

Biggest win
- American Samoa 0–5 Samoa (Nukuʻalofa, Tonga; 21 June 2016)

Biggest defeat
- New Zealand 16–0 Samoa (Suva, Fiji; 5 September 1988)

World Cup
- Appearances: 0

OFC U-20 Championship
- Appearances: 9 (1988, 1994, 1998, 2001, 2002, 2005, 2007, 2016, 2018)
- Best result: Quarter Final (2022)

The Samoa national under-20 association football team (Samoan: Sāmoa soka au) represents Samoa in under-20 competitions and is controlled by the Football Federation Samoa, the governing body for football in Samoa. Samoa's U20 home ground is Toleafoa J.S Blatter Soccer Stadium in Apia. It was known as the Western Samoa national under-20 football team until 1997, following the renaming of the country. Samoa is a part of the FIFA Goal project. The 2022 squad consisted of 18 non-Samoan based players out of a squad of 26, this was made possible through extensive worldwide scouting, no other country in the OFC region has seen this amount of off shore players in an U20 squad.

== Competitive record ==
=== OFC ===
The OFC Under 20 Qualifying Tournament is a tournament held once every two years to decide the only two qualification spots for the Oceania Football Confederation (OFC) and its representatives at the FIFA U-20 World Cup.

OFC U-19 Championship								Qualification record					
Year	Round	Pld	W	D	L	GF	GA	Pld	W	D	L	GF	GA
as Western Samoa
(French Polynesia) 1974	Did not enter							No qualification					
(New Zealand) 1978	Did not enter							No qualification					
(Fiji) 1980	Did not enter							No qualification					
(Papua New Guinea) 1982	Did not enter							No qualification					
(Australia) 1985	Did not enter							No qualification					
(New Zealand) 1986	Did not enter							No qualification					
(Fiji) 1988	Group stage	3	0	0	3	1	31	No qualification					
(Fiji) 1990	Did not enter							No qualification					
(French Polynesia) 1992	Did not enter							No qualification					
(Fiji) 1994	Group stage	3	1	0	2	2	6	No qualification					
(French Polynesia) 1997	Did not enter							No qualification					
as Samoa
(Samoa) 1998	Group stage	3	1	0	2	1	12	No qualification					
(New Caledonia) (Cook Islands) 2001	Group stage	5	2	0	3	6	22	No qualification					
(Vanuatu) (Fiji) 2002	Group stage	4	1	0	3	6	12	No qualification					
(Solomon Islands) 2005	Group stage	3	0	0	3	1	22	No qualification					
(New Zealand) 2007	Seventh place	6	0	0	6	4	33	No qualification					
(French Polynesia) 2008	Did not enter							No qualification					
(New Zealand) 2011	Did not enter							No qualification					
(Fiji) 2013	Did not enter							No qualification					
(Fiji) 2014	Did not enter							No qualification					
(Tonga) (Vanuatu) 2016	Did not qualify							3	1	1	1	8	4
(Cook Islands) (French Polynesia) 2018	Did not qualify							3	2	1	0	5	1
(French Polynesia) 2022	Quarter-finals	2	0	0	2	1	8	No qualification					
(Vanuatu) (Samoa) 2024	Group stage	4	1	0	4	4	12	Qualified automatically					
Total	Group stage	39	9	2	29	39	163						

Samoa's starting line-up against Fiji, OFC U-20 Championship 2022, Quarter Final

=== Current technical staff ===
Position	
Head coach	(New Zealand) Matt Calcott
Assistant coach	(New Zealand) Alastair McLae
Team manager	(New Zealand) Gareth Winder
Goal Keeper Coach	(Samoa) Horst Petana
Coach	(Samoa) Paul Lomitusi
Physio	(New Zealand) Ethan Horne
International Scout	(New Zealand) Alastair McLae
International Scout	(England) Russ Gurr

== Current squad ==
The following players were called up for the 2022 OFC U-19 Championship from 7 to 20 September 2022. Names in italics denote players who have been capped for the Senior team.

Caps and goals as of 19 September 2022 after the game against Fiji.

No.	Pos.	Player	Date of birth (age)	Caps	Goals	Club
1	GK	Joel Bartley	13 April 2005 (age 21)	2	0	(Football Australia) Sydney United 58
22	GK	Semu Faimata	10 August 2003 (age 23)	0	0	(Football Federation Samoa) Vailima Kiwi
28	GK	Neville Peni	18 August 2004 (age 22)	0	0	(Football Federation Samoa) Faleasiu
2	DF	Elijah Uelese	10 March 2003 (age 23)	2	0	(Football Australia) Mt Druitt Town Rangers
3	DF	Elijah Fiaalii	2 December 2003 (age 22)	2	0	(Football Australia) Dandenong City
4	DF	Taine Wilson	8 November 2004 (age 21)	2	0	(New Zealand Football) Western Springs
5	DF	Fetuao Belcher	1 May 2003 (age 23)	2	0	(New Zealand Football) Napier City Rovers
12	DF	Rushonn Tafunai	3 March 2006 (age 20)	2	0	(Football Australia) Melbourne Victory
14	DF	Luke Tolo Kent	29 April 2003 (age 23)	2	0	(New Zealand Football) Miramar Rangers
19	DF	Samuel Tauai	17 May 2004 (age 22)	0	0	(Football Federation Samoa) Lepea
6	MF	Laauli Blakelock	29 January 2003 (age 23)	2	0	
10	MF	Jarvis Filimalae	20 April 2003 (age 23)	0	0	(Brazilian Football Confederation) Fluminense
15	MF	Reupena Fatu	14 January 2005 (age 21)	0	0	(Football Federation Samoa) Goldstar Sogi
16	MF	Alton Leiataua	27 November 2005 (age 20)	0	0	(Football Federation Samoa) Vaivase-Tai
21	MF	Jonny Aoelua	22 November 2003 (age 22)	0	0	(Football Federation Samoa) Lepea
23	MF	James Settle	15 July 2003 (age 23)	2	0	(United States Soccer Federation) Corondao
25	MF	Philip Fatialofa	25 July 2005 (age 21)	0	0	(New Zealand Football) Stop Out
7	FW	Victor Leddy	21 December 2003 (age 22)	2	1	(Football Australia) Ipswich Knights
8	FW	Jesse Vine	23 January 2003 (age 23)	2	0	(Football Australia) Kemps Creek United
9	FW	Greg Siamoa	21 August 2003 (age 23)	2	0	(Football Australia) Western United
11	FW	Juan Gobbi	17 November 2005 (age 20)	1	0	(Football Australia) Mounties Wanderers
13	FW	Luke Salisbury	15 September 2004 (age 22)	0	0	(New Zealand Football) Roslyn-Wakari
17	FW	Kyah Cahill	13 March 2003 (age 23)	2	0	(Qatar Football Association) Lusail
18	FW	Alex Malauulu	12 March 2006 (age 20)	2	0	(Football Australia) Monaro Panthers
20	FW	Lesley Bethem	15 May 2004 (age 22)	2	0	(Football Federation Samoa) Faleasiu
24	FW	Ethan Stowers	26 October 2005 (age 20)	0	0	(Football Federation Samoa) Fa'atoia United
