= Sam Jenkins =

Sam Jenkins may refer to:

- Sam Sorbo, née Jenkins, American actress
- Sam Jenkins (footballer), New Zealand footballer
- Sam Jenkins (politician), member of the Louisiana House of Representatives
