= 2024 OFC U-19 Men's Championship qualification =

Tournament details
- Host country: Vanuatu
- Dates: 9–15 April
- Teams: 4 (from 1 confederation)
- Venue: 1 (in 1 host city)

Final positions
- Champions: Vanuatu
- Runners-up: Cook Islands
- Third place: Tonga
- Fourth place: American Samoa

Tournament statistics
- Matches played: 6
- Goals scored: 23 (3.83 per match)
- Attendance: 8,050 (1,342 per match)
- Top scorer: (American Samoa) Petu Pouli (3 goals)

The qualifying tournament for the 2024 OFC U-19 Men's Championship was held from 9–15 April.

== Teams ==
Team	Final tournament appearances
American Samoa	6
Cook Islands	4
Tonga	7
Vanuatu	16

== Venue ==
Qualifying tournament venues being played in Tonga in one host city in Port Vila.

Vanuatu
Port Vila
Freshwater Stadium
Capacity: 6,500
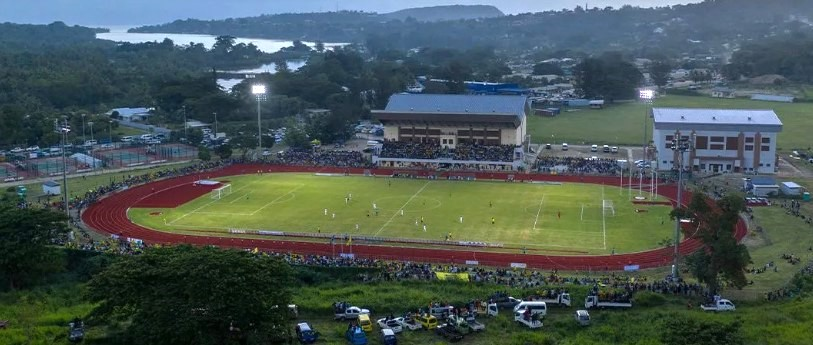

== Group stage ==
The draw for the group stage was held 5 March 2024.

=== Tiebreakers ===
Tie-breaking criteria for group play
The ranking of teams in the group stage was determined as follows:
1. Total points;
2. Goal difference in all group matches;
3. Goals scored in all group matches;
4. Head-to-head result between tied teams;
  1. Points in matches among the tied teams;
  2. Goal difference in matches among the tied teams;
  3. Goals scored in matches among the tied teams;
5. Fair play points in all group matches (only one deduction per player, per match):
  - One yellow card: −1 point;
  - Two yellow cards (indirect red card): −3 points;
  - Direct red card: −4 points;
  - Yellow card and direct red card: −5 points;
6. Drawing of lots.

=== Qualifying group ===
Pos	Team	Pld	W	D	L	GF	GA	GD	Pts	Qualification	(Vanuatu)	(Cook Islands)	(Tonga)	(American Samoa)
1	Vanuatu (H)	3	3	0	0	9	0	+9	9	Qualify for Final tournament	—	—	—	4–0
2	Cook Islands	3	1	1	1	4	5	−1	4		0–2	—	—	—
3	Tonga	3	1	1	1	5	7	−2	4		0–3	1–1	—	—
4	American Samoa	3	0	0	3	5	11	−6	0		—	2–3	3–4	—

Source: OFC
(H) Hosts
9 April 2024
12:00

Tonga	1–1	Cook Islands
Teu 90+1'	Report	Tuakanangaro 21'

Freshwater Stadium, Port Vila, Vanuatu
Attendance: 350
Referee: Kyllian Lelarge (New Caledonia)
9 April 2024
15:00

Vanuatu	4–0	American Samoa
Waoute 6'; Numake 45', 45+5'; Tasarur 70'	Report

Freshwater Stadium, Port Vila, Vanuatu
Attendance: 1,000
Referee: Neeshil Varman (Fiji)

12 April 2024
12:00

American Samoa	2–3	Cook Islands
Pouli 43' (pen.); Lee 51'	Report	Wichman 15', 45'; Lopez 67'

Freshwater Stadium, Port Vila, Vanuatu
Attendance: 200
Referee: Gerard Ionatana (Samoa)
12 April 2024
15:00

Tonga	0–3	Vanuatu
	Report	Teu 60' (o.g.); Luake 68'; Loren 88'

Freshwater Stadium, Port Vila, Vanuatu
Attendance: 2,000
Referee: Gideon Mamuala (Solomon Islands)

15 April 2024
12:00

American Samoa	3–4	Tonga
Lee 18'; Pouli 69', 90+2' (pen.)	Report	Foliaki 16'; Tai 56', 73'; Vaekau 59'

Freshwater Stadium, Port Vila, Vanuatu
Attendance: 1,000
Referee: Keith Kitumbing (Papua New Guinea)
15 April 2024
15:00

Cook Islands	0–2	Vanuatu
	Report	Natou 45'; Waoute 55'

Freshwater Stadium, Port Vila, Vanuatu
Attendance: 3,500
Referee: Neeshil Varman (Fiji)
