= Paulo Posiano =

Fijian footballer

Personal information
- Full name: Paulo Posiano
- Date of birth: April 7, 1988 (age 38)
- Position: Defender

Team information
- Current team: Rewa
- Number: 17

Senior career*
Years	Team	Apps	(Gls)
2012–	Rewa F.C.		

International career^{‡}
2012–	Fiji	1	(0)
Medal record
Men's football
Representing Fiji
OFC U-20 Championship
Runner-up	2007 New Zealand
- * Club domestic league appearances and goals ‡ National team caps and goals as of 10 March 2013

Paulo Posiano is a Fijian footballer who plays as a defender for the Rewa.

== Honours ==
Fiji U20

- OFC U-20 Championship: Runner-Up, 2007
