= Ali Mekawir =

Solomon Islands footballer

Personal information
- Full name: Mohammad Ali Mekawir
- Date of birth: 27 July 2000 (age 26)
- Place of birth: Solomon Islands
- Height: 1.75 m (5 ft 9 in)
- Position: Forward

Team information
- Current team: Navua F.C.

Senior career*
Years	Team	Apps	(Gls)
2017	Hana		
2018	Marist		
2019	Western United		
2019–2020	Langney Wanderers	11	(5)
2021	Honiara City		
2021–2022	Waneagu United		
2022	Adelaide City	9	(0)
2023–2024	TFA Dubai		
2024–	Navua F.C.		

International career
2017	Solomon Islands U17	4	(3)
2018	Solomon Islands U20	5	(1)
2022–	Solomon Islands	2	(0)
- * Club domestic league appearances and goals

Ali Mekawir (born 27 July 2000) is a Solomon Islands professional footballer who currently plays for Navua F.C. in Fiji and the Solomon Islands national team.

== Club career ==
In his early career Mekawir played with Hana and Marist. In 2019 he joined Western United. Later that year he was one of three Solomon Islands footballers to join a club in England after attending the local Stars Football Academy. With Langney Wanderers of the Southern Combination Football League Premier Division, Mekawir scored against Tower Hamlets in the 2020–21 FA Cup to become the first-ever Solomon Islands player to score in the tournament. Later that month he went on to score against Eastbourne United in the 2020–21 FA Vase. He scored a total of five goals in eleven league appearances that season.

In January 2021 Mekawir returned to the Solomon Islands and joined Telekom S-League debutantes Honiara City. He debuted for the club on 24 January 2021, scoring a goal in the eventual draw with league leaders Henderson Eels. He went on to be one of the top scorers in the league that season. The following season he moved to Waneagu United.

In April 2022 it was confirmed that Mekawir had signed with Adelaide City of the NPL South Australia.

== International ==
Mekawir represented the Solmon Islands in the 2017 OFC U-17 Championship. He scored a hattrick in the Solomon's 12–0 victory over Samoa. The following year he was called up again for the 2018 OFC U-19 Championship. The team advanced to the semi-finals before being eliminated by Tahiti. Mekawir scored his side's only goal in the 1–3 defeat.

In March 2022 Mekawir was included in the Solomon Islands senior squad for 2022 FIFA World Cup qualification. In preparation for the tournament the Solomon Islands held a training camp in Australia and played local club sides. Mekawir scored against two-time National Premier Leagues Queensland side Lions FC in the final match before departing for Qatar. He went on to make his senior international debut on 17 March 2022 in the opening match against the Cook Islands.

=== International career statistics ===
As of match played 30 March 2022

Solomon Islands
Year	Apps	Goals
2022	2	0
Total	2	0
