= Leroy Jennings =

Fijian footballer (born 1998)

Personal information
- Full name: Leroy Jennings
- Date of birth: 3 March 1998 (age 28)
- Place of birth: Sydney, New South Wales, Australia
- Height: 1.84 m (6 ft 0 in)
- Position: Central midfielder

Team information
- Current team: Sydney United
- Number: 32

Youth career
- 2012–2013: LA Galaxy II
- 2014–2016: Wrexham
- 2016–2017: Newcastle Jets

Senior career*
Years	Team	Apps	(Gls)
2017	Newcastle Jets NPL	16	(3)
2018	Sutherland Sharks	20	(1)
2019–2020	Blacktown City	34	(9)
2021–2022	Wollongong Wolves	38	(13)
2023–	Sydney United	55	(10)

International career^{‡}
2016	Fiji U20	3	(1)
2024–	Fiji	4	(0)
- * Club domestic league appearances and goals as of 19 October 2026 ‡ National team caps and goals as of 20 May 2025

Leroy Jennings (born 3 March 1998) is a professional football player who plays as a central midfielder for Sydney United in the National Premier Leagues NSW. Born in Australia, Jennings plays for the Fiji national team.

== Club career ==
Jennings signed for LA Galaxy academy on a 1-year deal after showing a good performance during trial, impressing the directors and receiving praise from David Beckham. After leaving LA Galaxy, Jennings signed for Wrexham in 2014, playing for the academy for two seasons.

On 27 October 2016, Jennings signed for the Newcastle Jets. He played for the youth team, making 16 appearances and 3 goals in the league. After departing and having stints with Sutherland Sharks and Blacktown City, Jennings signed for Wollongong Wolves on 24 December 2020.

On 17 December 2022, Jennings was announced to play for Sydney United for the 2023 NPL NSW season. He made his debut for the club on 5 February 2023 against Fairfield rivals Marconi, scoring two goals in the second half to win the match 3–1 at full time.

== International career ==
Jennings was selected for the Fiji national under-20 team ahead of their 2016 OFC U-20 Championship. Jennings played all three group matches, scoring one goal against New Caledonia but failing to qualify for the knockout rounds. However, one month before the OFC 2018 FIFA World Cup playoff, Jennings rejected the call-up for the Fiji national team because of his interest in representing Australia instead.

== Personal life ==
Jennings was born in Sydney, Australia to parents of Italian and Tongan-Fijian descent. He is the cousin to Michael Jennings and George Jennings, both of whom played rugby league professionally in the National Rugby League. He is also related to Arthur Jennings, who represented the New Zealand national rugby union team during his playing career.

Outside of football, Jennings took an interest in boxing and basketball, the latter after taking inspiration from The Last Dance on Netflix. He also learnt to speak Italian, having been able to speak basic for most of his early life and to play the piano during the COVID-19 pandemic in Australia. He is affectionately nicknamed the "speedster" or "specimen" by his teammates.

== Honours ==
With Sydney United 58:

- National Premier Leagues NSW Championship: 2026
- Waratah Cup Champions: 2023, 2026
