= Samuelu Malo =

Samoan footballer

Personal information
- Full name: Samuelu Malo Vaga
- Date of birth: April 4, 1999 (age 27)
- Position: Midfielder

Youth career
- Samoa Football Academy

Senior career*
Years	Team	Apps	(Gls)
2013–present	Samoa Football Academy		

International career^{‡}
2013–2015	Samoa U17	6	(1)
2016–2018	Samoa U20	6	(4)
2019	Samoa U23	1	(1)
2016–present	Samoa	2	(0)
- * Club domestic league appearances and goals as of 29 May 2016 ‡ National team caps and goals as of 2 November 2021

Samuelu Malo (born 4 April 1999) is a Samoan footballer who plays as a midfielder for Vailima Kiwi FC and the Samoa national football team. He made his debut for the national team at the 2016 OFC Nations Cup on May 29, 2016 in their 4–0 defeat to Tahiti.

== Career ==
In January 2019, he was selected for Vailima Kiwi's team to contest the 2019 OFC Champions League.

In May 2018 he was selected for the Samoa national under-20 football team for the 2018 OFC U-19 Championship. In September 2019 he was selected for the Samoa national under-23 football team for the 2019 OFC Men's Olympic Qualifying Tournament.
