= Terai Bremond =

Tahitian footballer (born 2001)

Personal information
- Full name: Terai Bremond
- Date of birth: 16 May 2001 (age 25)
- Place of birth: Tahiti, French Polynesia
- Height: 1.86 m (6 ft 1 in)
- Position: Midfielder

Team information
- Current team: Tahiti United

Senior career*
Years	Team	Apps	(Gls)
–2021	Toulouse B	6	(0)
2021–2026	Vénus		
2026–	Tahiti United	0	(0)

International career^{‡}
2022–	Tahiti	8	(0)
Medal record
Men's football
Representing Tahiti
OFC Nations Cup
Third place	2024 Fiji/Vanuatu
OFC U-20 Championship
Runner-up	2018 Cook Islands/Tahiti
- * Club domestic league appearances and goals ‡ National team caps and goals as of 26 October 2024

Terai Bremond (born 16 May 2001) is a Tahitian footballer who plays as a midfielder for Tahiti United.

== Career ==
=== Club career ===
Bremond started his career with the reserves of French Ligue 1 side Toulouse. In 2021, he signed for Vénus in Tahiti.

=== International career ===
Bremond represented Tahiti at the 2019 FIFA U-20 World Cup.

== Honours ==
Tahiti

- OFC Nations Cup: 3rd place, 2024

Tahiti U20

- OFC U-20 Championship: Runner-up, 2018
