= Joe Bell (footballer) =

New Zealand footballer (born 1999)

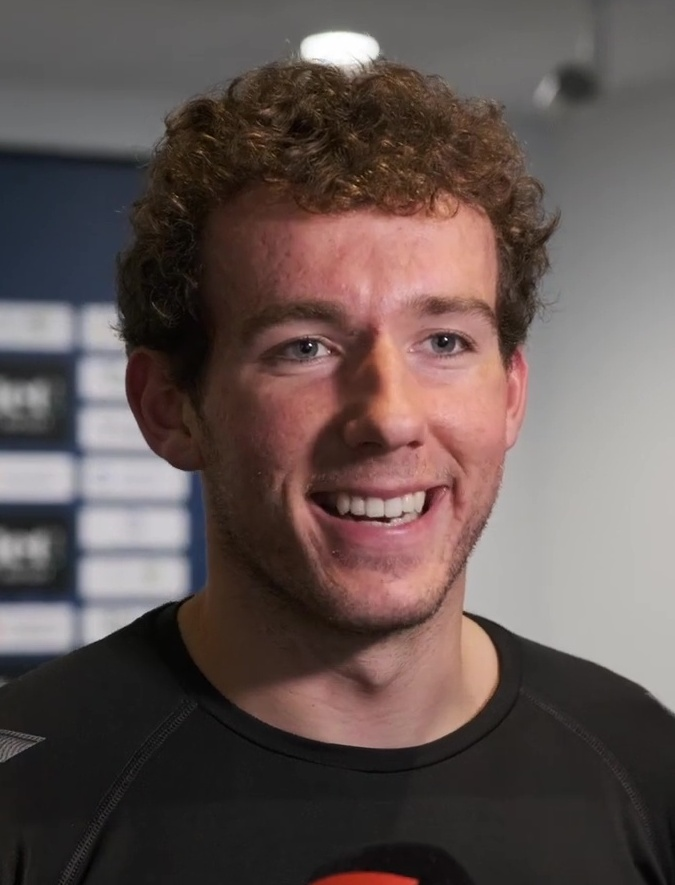
- Bell in 2023

Personal information
- Full name: Joe Zen Robert Bell
- Date of birth: 27 April 1999 (age 27)
- Place of birth: Bristol, England
- Height: 1.82 m (6 ft 0 in)
- Position: Defensive midfielder

Team information
- Current team: Viking
- Number: 8

Youth career
- 2007–2012: Ferrymead Bays
- 2013: Nomads United
- 2014: Miramar Rangers

College career
Years	Team	Apps	(Gls)
2017–2019	Virginia Cavaliers	60	(10)

Senior career*
Years	Team	Apps	(Gls)
2014–2017	Wellington Phoenix Reserves	34	(0)
2018	Charlottesville Alliance	3	(1)
2020–2022	Viking	56	(3)
2022–2023	Brøndby IF	34	(0)
2023–	Viking	74	(3)

International career^{‡}
2015	New Zealand U17	3	(0)
2016–2019	New Zealand U20	15	(3)
2021–2024	New Zealand Olympic (O.P.)	7	(0)
2019–	New Zealand	35	(1)
- * Club domestic league appearances and goals as of 09:10, 26 May 2026 (UTC) ‡ National team caps and goals as of 15:35, 27 June 2026 (UTC)

Joe Zen Robert Bell (born 27 April 1999) is a professional footballer who plays as a defensive midfielder for Eliteserien club Viking. Born in England, he represents the New Zealand national team.

== Early and personal life ==
Bell was born in Bristol, England but holds dual British and New Zealand citizenship. He was raised in Wānaka and Christchurch, attending Medbury School and Christ's College, Christchurch before moving aged 15 to Wellington to attend Scots College and play for the Phoenix.

He started playing football as an eight-year-old for Ferrymead Bays.

== Club career ==
=== Wellington Phoenix Reserves ===
Bell moved to Wellington to join the Wellington Phoenix Academy under the guidance of Jess Ibrom where he started playing for the Wellington Phoenix Reserves in the New Zealand Football Championship for the 2014–15 season, playing 12 games with four starts. He played for the reserves for another two seasons, appearing 14 times in the 2015–16 season with 10 starts and eight times with six starts in the 2016–17 season. With the New Zealand football championship played over the summer, Bell played for Wellington United in the Central League during the winter.

=== Virginia Cavaliers ===
Bell joined the Virginia Cavaliers who play in the NCAA Division I in the Atlantic Coast Conference. Bell started 55 straight games since joining the university. He scored six goals and had ten assists across three seasons, while also spending time with amateur club Charlottesville Alliance during the 2018 NPSL season.

Following his successful FIFA U-20 World Cup campaign, Bell drew the interest of several European sides, trialing with Eliteserien side Viking and eventually being offered a contract. However, with the University of Virginia offering him a full scholarship at year's end, Bell decided to delay going professional to get his degree.

Bell had a successful 2019 season with the Cavaliers as co-captain of the team which won the ACC Coastal Division and won the ACC men's tournament for the first time since 2009. The team ended the season winning 21 games, which was one shy of a school record. The Cavaliers entered the 2019 NCAA Tournament as the No. 1 seed. After wins over Campbell, St. John's, SMU and Wake Forest, Virginia lost in the final to Georgetown finishing runner up for the second time in school history. Bell ended the season playing 21 games of which he started all 21 of them, only missing two games during the ACC tournament while on International duty. He scored seven goals, of which four came during the NCAA tournament, as well as had four assists.

Bell also won a number of awards both on the field and academic, including United Soccer Coaches Scholar Player of the Year, First Team Scholar All-American, ACC First Team and ACC Midfielder of the Year He was also one of three finalists for the MAC Hermann Trophy for best player in the country.

=== Viking ===
On 10 January 2020, Bell signed a three-year contract with Viking in the Norwegian Eliteserien.

=== Brøndby IF ===
On transfer deadline day, 31 January 2022, Bell signed a four-and-a-half-year contract with reigning Danish Superliga champions Brøndby IF.

=== Return to Viking ===
On 29 August 2023, Bell returned to Viking, signing a four-year contract with the club. He was named in the Eliteserien Team of the Year as Viking won the 2025 Eliteserien.

== International career ==
=== U17 ===
Bell was selected for the New Zealand U17 national team that played in the 2015 FIFA U-17 World Cup in Chile. He played in two of the group games, a 0–0 draw with Syria and a 2–1 win over Paraguay. As well as their loss to Brazil in the Round of 16 with a stoppage-time penalty seeing them eliminated from the competition.

=== U20 ===
Bell has played for and captained the New Zealand U20 national team. Playing in the 2018 OFC U-19 Championship where he was the tournament MVP and they qualified for the 2019 FIFA U-20 World Cup in Poland. He has also played and captained the team at the 2017 FIFA U-20 World Cup in South Korea.

=== Senior ===
Bell made his team debut for the New Zealand senior national team in a friendly against Ireland, starting in a 3–1 loss.

On 25 June 2021, Bell was called up to the New Zealand squad for the delayed 2020 Summer Olympics.

On 14 May 2026, Bell was selected in the 26-man squad for the 2026 FIFA World Cup.

== Career statistics ==
=== Club ===
As of match played 25 April 2026

Appearances and goals by club, season and competition
Club	Season	League			Cup (Note: Includes Norwegian Football Cup, Danish Cup)		Continental		Total	
Club	Season	Division	Apps	Goals	Apps	Goals	Apps	Goals	Apps	Goals
Wellington Phoenix; Reserves	2014–15	Premiership	12	0	—		—		12	0
Wellington Phoenix; Reserves	2015–16	Premiership	14	0	—		—		14	0
Wellington Phoenix; Reserves	2016–17	Premiership	8	0	—		—		8	0
Wellington Phoenix; Reserves	Total		34	0	—		—		34	0
Viking	2020	Eliteserien	29	2	0	0	1 (Note: Appearances in UEFA Europa League)	0	30	2
Viking	2021	Eliteserien	27	1	1	0	—		28	1
Viking	Total		56	3	1	0	1	0	58	3
Brøndby	2021–22	Danish Superliga	15	0	0	0	—		15	0
Brøndby	2022–23	Danish Superliga	18	0	1	0	4 (Note: Appearances in UEFA Conference League)	0	23	0
Brøndby	2023–24	Danish Superliga	1	0	0	0	—		1	0
Brøndby	Total		34	0	1	0	4	0	39	0
Viking	2023	Eliteserien	11	0	0	0	—		11	0
Viking	2024	Eliteserien	28	0	3	0	—		31	0
Viking	2025	Eliteserien	29	3	5	0	3	0	37	3
Viking	2026	Eliteserien	16	0	2	0	4 (Note: Appearances in UEFA Champions League)	0	21	0
Viking	Total		0	0	0	0	0	0	0	0
Career total			198	6	11	0	8	0	217	6

=== International ===
As of match played 26 June 2026

Appearances and goals by national team and year
National team	Year	Apps	Goals
New Zealand	2019	2	0
New Zealand	2021	3	0
New Zealand	2022	7	1
New Zealand	2023	6	0
New Zealand	2024	4	0
New Zealand	2025	7	0
New Zealand	2026	6	0
Total		35	1

Scores and results list New Zealand's goal tally first, score column indicates score after each Bell goal.

List of international goals scored by Joe Bell
No.	Date	Venue	Opponent	Score	Result	Competition
1	30 March 2022	Grand Hamad Stadium, Doha, Qatar	Solomon Islands	3–0	5–0	2022 FIFA World Cup qualification

== Honours ==
Viking

- Eliteserien: 2025

New Zealand U19

- OFC U-19 Championship: 2018
- 2018 OFC U-19 Championship Golden Ball

Individual

- All-ACC Team Awards – Freshman Team 2017, Third Team 2018, First Team 2019 and ACC Midfielder of the Year: 2019
- TopDrawerSoccer.com National Player of the Year Award: 2019
- Soccer America Player of the Year Award: 2019
- Eliteserien Player of the Month: August 2021
