= Alvin Singh =

Fijian footballer

Personal information
- Full name: Alvin Singh
- Date of birth: 9 June 1988 (age 38)
- Place of birth: Yalalevu, Ba, Fiji
- Height: 1.82 m (5 ft 11 1/2 in)
- Position: Centre back

Team information
- Current team: Mt Druitt Town Rangers

Senior career*
Years	Team	Apps	(Gls)
2008–2010	Ba		
2010–2011	Hekari United		
2011–2013	Ba		
2013–2014	Mounties Wanderers	34	(10)
2014–2016	Ba		
2017	APIA Leichhardt	0	(0)
2018–2020	Mt Druitt Town Rangers	11	(0)

International career^{‡}
2008–	Fiji	20	(1)
Medal record
Men's football
Representing Fiji
OFC Nations Cup
Third place	2008 Oceania
OFC U-20 Championship
Runner-up	2007 New Zealand
- * Club domestic league appearances and goals as of 23 September 2019 ‡ National team caps and goals as of 26 June 2016

Alvin Singh (born 9 June 1988) is a Fijian footballer who plays as a centre back for Mt Druitt Town Rangers FC and the Fiji national football team.

== International career ==
Singh made his debut for the senior national team in a 2–0 win against Vanuatu on 6 September 2008.

On 16 July 2016, he was named as one of the three over-aged players for the Fiji under-23 team at the 2016 Summer Olympics. He played in all three of Fiji's group matches at the tournament, which ended in defeats of 8–0 to South Korea, 5–1 to Mexico and 10–0 to Germany.

== International goals ==
#	Date	Venue	Opponent	Score	Result	Competition
1	19 August 2015	Govind Park, Ba, Fiji	Tonga	2–0	5–0	Friendly

== Honours ==
Fiji

- OFC Nations Cup: 3rd place, 2008

Fiji U20

- OFC U-20 Championship: Runner-Up, 2007
