= Eddy Kaspard =

Tahitian footballer (2001–2025)

Personal information
- Full name: Eddy Helfara Aru Kaspard
- Date of birth: 27 May 2001
- Place of birth: Papeete, Tahiti
- Date of death: 14 August 2025 (aged 24)
- Place of death: Pāʻea, Tahiti
- Height: 1.78 m (5 ft 10 in)
- Position: Forward

Youth career
- 2006–2011: A.S. Manu-Ura
- 2011–2016: A.S. Tefana
- 2017–2020: Trélissac

Senior career*
Years	Team	Apps	(Gls)
2020–2022	Trélissac	0	(0)
2022–2023	Pouzauges Bocage	11	(1)
2023–2024	A.S. Tefana		(7)
2024–2025	A.S. Vénus		(37)

International career
2017	Tahiti U17	3	(1)
2018–2019	Tahiti U20	6	(3)
2022–2025	Tahiti	15	(4)
Medal record
Men's football
Representing Tahiti
OFC Nations Cup
Third place	2024 Fiji/Vanuatu
OFC U-20 Championship
Runner-up	2018 Cook Islands/Tahiti
- * Club domestic league appearances and goals

Eddy Helfara Aru Kaspard (27 May 2001 – 14 August 2025) was a Tahitian professional footballer who last played as a forward for Tahiti Ligue 1 club A.S. Vénus and the Tahiti national team.

== Club career ==
As a youth Kaspard began playing with A.S. Manu-Ura from age five to ten. He then moved to A.S. Tefana where he remained until 2015. That year he participated in a trial in Metropolitan France organized by Tefana. After being spotted by Ligue 1 club Saint-Étienne in a tournament, he was invited to return when he turned sixteen. However, the return trial was unsuccessful and he then had a test period with Auxerre. After not being offered a spot in the club, he had a successful trial with Trélissac of the Championnat National 2 in 2017. That year he reportedly also drew interest from Monaco. In the 2021–22 Coupe de France Kaspard appeared for Trélissac in the club's Seventh Round victory over A.S. Vénus, Tahiti's representative in the tournament that season.

In December 2022, Kaspard moved to Pouzauges Bocage FC of the Championnat National 3.

At the time of his death, he was playing for A.S. Vénus.

== International career ==
As a youth Kaspard represented Tahiti at the under-17 and under-20 levels. He captained the Tahiti team at the 2017 OFC U-17 Championship and scored against Papua New Guinea in the final match of the Group Stage. After turning down an offer to play for France at the under-19 level, Kaspard scored three goals in the 2018 OFC U-19 Championship. He scored against New Zealand and Papua New Guinea in the Group Stage before adding a goal against the Solomon Islands in the Semi-finals. Kaspard's three goals put him tied for third place in the tournament's Golden Boot race. Tahiti ultimately finished as runners-up in the tournament and qualified for the 2019 FIFA U-20 World Cup in Poland. Kaspard was then named to Tahiti's final roster for the tournament and appeared in all three of the nation's Group Stage matches. Ahead of the tournament he was identified as Tahiti's Player to Watch by Goal.

In February 2022, Kaspard was named to Tahiti's roster for a training camp in France and 2022 FIFA World Cup qualification. He was one of four foreign-based players in the squad.

== Personal life and death ==
Kaspard's father, Abet Kaspard Tahi, is a former footballer from Pentecost Island, Vanuatu and a former member of the New Hebrides national team. His mother is from Tahiti where the younger Kaspard was born and raised.

On 14 August 2025, Kaspard died following a road collision in Pāʻea. He was 24.

== Career statistics ==
Appearances and goals by national team and year
National team	Year	Apps	Goals
Tahiti	2022	2	0
Tahiti	2023	6	3
Tahiti	2024	6	1
Tahiti	2025	1	0
Total		15	4

Scores and results list Tahiti's goal tally first, score column indicates score after each Kaspard goal.

List of international goals scored by Eddy Kaspard
No.	Date	Venue	Opponent	Score	Result	Competition
1	28 August 2023	Stade Pater Te Hono Nui, Pirae, French Polynesia	Cook Islands	2–0	9–1	Friendly
2	31 August 2023	Stade Pater Te Hono Nui, Pirae, French Polynesia	Cook Islands	2–0	3–0	Friendly
3	24 November 2023	SIFF Academy Field, Honiara, Solomon Islands	Northern Mariana Islands	5–0	5–0	2023 Pacific Games
4	15 November 2024	Waikato Stadium, Hamilton, New Zealand	Samoa	1–0	3–0	2026 FIFA World Cup qualification

== Honours ==
Tahiti

- OFC Nations Cup: 3rd place, 2024

Tahiti U20

- OFC U-20 Championship: Runner-up, 2018
