= 2016 OFC U-20 Championship =

Tournament details
- Host country: Tonga (preliminary stage); Vanuatu (final stage)
- Dates: 21–27 June 2016 (preliminary stage); 3–17 September 2016 (final stage)
- Teams: 8 (final stage); 11 (total) (from 1 confederation)
- Venue: 2 (in 2 host cities)

Final positions
- Champions: New Zealand (6th title)
- Runners-up: Vanuatu

Tournament statistics
- Matches played: 21
- Goals scored: 67 (3.19 per match)
- Top scorer(s): (Cook Islands) Dwayne Tiputoa (New Zealand) Myer Bevan (5 goals each)
- Best player: (New Zealand) Myer Bevan
- Best goalkeeper: (New Zealand) Michael Woud
- Fair play award: Solomon Islands

The 2016 OFC U-20 Championship was the 21st edition of the OFC U-20 Championship, the biennial international youth football tournament organized by the Oceania Football Confederation (OFC) for players aged 19 and below (despite the name remaining as U-20 Championship). This year, the tournament was held in Vanuatu for the first time by itself (second time overall).

Despite the name remaining as U-20 Championship, the age limit was reduced by a year to 19 years of age. So players who wanted to participate in the tournament needed to be born on or after 1 January 1997. At an OFC Executive Committee meeting held at its Auckland headquarters in November 2013 the competition format was modified. The competition was brought forward a year and the age limit was lowered to 19 years of age. The changes were made in order to allow the winner of the competition plenty of time for preparation and player development for upcoming World Cups at Under 20 level.

In March 2015, FIFA decided that the OFC gets two slots at every FIFA U-20 and U-17 World Cup. So the top two teams qualified for the 2017 FIFA U-20 World Cup in South Korea.

== Format ==
The qualification structure is as follows:

- First round: American Samoa, Cook Islands, Samoa and Tonga played a round-robin tournament in Tonga. The winner qualified for the tournament.
- Tournament (2016 OFC U-20 Championship): A total of eight teams (Fiji, New Caledonia, New Zealand, Papua New Guinea, Solomon Islands, Tahiti, Vanuatu, and the first round winner) played the tournament in Vanuatu. For the group stage, they were divided into two groups of four teams. The top two teams of each group advanced to the knockout stage (semi-finals and final) to decide the winner of the 2016 OFC U-20 Championship and the two teams that qualified for the 2017 FIFA U-20 World Cup.

== Teams ==
All 11 FIFA-affiliated national teams from the OFC entered qualification.

Seeding	Teams	No. of teams
First round entrants	American Samoa; Cook Islands; Samoa; Tonga	4
Second round entrants	Fiji; New Caledonia; New Zealand; Papua New Guinea; Solomon Islands; Tahiti; Vanuatu	7

== Venues ==
Tonga	Vanuatu	
‘Atele	Port Vila	Luganville
Loto-Tonga Soka Centre	Port Vila Municipal Stadium	Luganville Soccer City Stadium
Capacity: 1,500	Capacity: 10,000	Capacity: 6,000
2016 OFC U-20 Championship is located in Tonga	2016 OFC U-20 Championship is located in Vanuatu	

== First round ==
The preliminary tournament was hosted by Tonga between 21 and 27 June 2016. The winner qualified for the tournament final.

Four referees and four assistant referees were named for the preliminary round of the tournament.

Referees

- (Fiji) Salesh Chand
- (Vanuatu) Joel Hoppken
- (Solomon Islands) Nelson Sogo
- (New Zealand) Campbell-Kirk Waugh

Assistant referees

- (Fiji) Ujwaal Mudliar
- (Fiji) Phul Singh
- (Solomon Islands) Jeffery Solodia
- (New Zealand) Isaac Trevis

All times are local, TOT (UTC+13).

Pos	Team	Pld	W	D	L	GF	GA	GD	Pts	Qualification
1	Cook Islands	3	2	1	0	7	1	+6	7	Second round
2	Samoa	3	1	1	1	8	4	+4	4	
3	Tonga (H)	3	0	3	0	5	5	0	3	
4	American Samoa	3	0	1	2	1	11	−10	1	

Source: OFC
(H) Hosts
21 June 2016
12:00

Tonga	1–1	Cook Islands
Po'oi 51'	Report	C. Tiputoa 77'

Loto-Tonga Soka Centre, ‘Atele
Attendance: 250
Referee: Joel Hopkken (Vanuatu)
21 June 2016
15:00

American Samoa	0–5	Samoa
	Report	Mariner 12'; Malo 30'; Hunt 48'; Tunupopo 64', 75'

Loto-Tonga Soka Centre, ‘Atele
Attendance: 250
Referee: Nelson Sogo (Solomon Islands)

24 June 2016
12:00

Tonga	1–1	American Samoa
Likiliki 10'	Report	Fiso 6'

Loto-Tonga Soka Centre, ‘Atele
Attendance: 200
Referee: Salesh Chand (Fiji)
24 June 2016
15:00

Samoa	0–1	Cook Islands
	Report	D. Tiputoa 85'

Loto-Tonga Soka Centre, ‘Atele
Attendance: 200
Referee: Campbell-Kirk Waugh (New Zealand)

27 June 2016
12:00

Cook Islands	5–0	American Samoa
Wood 31'; Samuela 38'; D. Tiputoa 54', 59', 72'	Report

Loto-Tonga Soka Centre, ‘Atele
Attendance: 200
Referee: Joel Hopkken (Vanuatu)
27 June 2016
15:00

Samoa	3–3	Tonga
Tunupopo 66', 70'; Malo 80'	Report	Polovili 10', 40', 73'

Loto-Tonga Soka Centre, ‘Atele
Attendance: 300
Referee: Campbell-Kirk Waugh (New Zealand)

== Second round ==
The tournament final was scheduled for 3–17 September 2016 (originally 19–26 September 2016). Vanuatu were announced as the host in December 2015.

The draw was held on 22 June 2016. The eight teams were drawn into two groups of four teams. There was no seeding, except that hosts Vanuatu were assigned to position A1 in the draw. The top two teams of each group advanced to the semi-finals.

All times are local, VUT (UTC+11).

=== Group A ===
Pos	Team	Pld	W	D	L	GF	GA	GD	Pts	Qualification
1	Vanuatu (H)	3	3	0	0	5	1	+4	9	Knockout stage
2	New Caledonia	3	1	1	1	5	3	+2	4	Knockout stage
3	Fiji	3	0	2	1	2	3	−1	2	
4	Papua New Guinea	3	0	1	2	3	8	−5	1	

Source: OFC
(H) Hosts
3 September 2016
12:00

Papua New Guinea	1–4	New Caledonia
Awi 34'	Report	Watrone 56'; Gope-Fenepej 68' (pen.); Poma 82'; Houala 90+4'

Port Vila Municipal Stadium, Port Vila
Referee: Kader Zitouni (Tahiti)
3 September 2016
15:00

Vanuatu	1–0	Fiji
Tenene 61'	Report

Port Vila Municipal Stadium, Port Vila
Referee: Nick Waldron (New Zealand)

6 September 2016
12:00

New Caledonia	1–1	Fiji
Gope-Fenepej 68'	Report	Jennings 25'

Port Vila Municipal Stadium, Port Vila
Referee: George Time (Solomon Islands)
6 September 2016
15:00

Vanuatu	3–1	Papua New Guinea
Wilkins 50' (pen.); Kalo 56'; Thomas 81'	Report	Yanum 77'

Port Vila Municipal Stadium, Port Vila
Referee: Campbell-Kirk Waugh (New Zealand)

10 September 2016
12:00

Fiji	1–1	Papua New Guinea
Catarogo 71'	Report	Dabinyaba 35'

Port Vila Municipal Stadium, Port Vila
Referee: Nelson Sogo (Solomon Islands)
10 September 2016
15:00

New Caledonia	0–1	Vanuatu
	Report	Wilkins 90+1' (pen.)

Port Vila Municipal Stadium, Port Vila
Referee: Nick Waldron (New Zealand)

=== Group B ===
Pos	Team	Pld	W	D	L	GF	GA	GD	Pts	Qualification
1	New Zealand	3	2	1	0	7	1	+6	7	Knockout stage
2	Solomon Islands	3	1	2	0	5	2	+3	5	Knockout stage
3	Tahiti	3	1	1	1	6	7	−1	4	
4	Cook Islands	3	0	0	3	1	9	−8	0	

Source: OFC
3 September 2016
12:00

New Zealand	3–0	Cook Islands
Bevan 30', 76', 90'	Report

Luganville Soccer City Stadium, Luganville
Referee: Salesh Chand (Fiji)
3 September 2016
15:00

Tahiti	2–2	Solomon Islands
Siejidr 13'; Salem 34'	Report	Witney 50'; Raramo 65'

Luganville Soccer City Stadium, Luganville
Referee: Joel Hopkken (Vanuatu)

6 September 2016
12:00

Cook Islands	0–3	Solomon Islands
	Report	Waita 54'; Witney 56', 83'

Luganville Soccer City Stadium, Luganville
Referee: Robinson Banga (Vanuatu)
6 September 2016
15:00

Tahiti	1–4	New Zealand
Petitgas 27'	Report	Dyer 39' (pen.); Lewis 61'; Imrie 65'; Bevan 87'

Luganville Soccer City Stadium, Luganville
Referee: Médéric Lacour (New Caledonia)

10 September 2016
12:00

Solomon Islands	0–0	New Zealand
	Report

Luganville Soccer City Stadium, Luganville
Referee: Médéric Lacour (New Caledonia)
10 September 2016
15:00

Cook Islands	1–3	Tahiti
D. Tiputoa 83' (pen.)	Report	Salem 45+2', 55'; Tau 87'

Luganville Soccer City Stadium, Luganville
Referee: Joel Hopkken (Vanuatu)

== Knockout stage ==
=== Bracket ===
Semi-finals
13 September – Luganville
New Zealand	3
New Caledonia	1
13 September – Port Vila
Vanuatu	2
Solomon Islands	1

Final
17 September – Port Vila
New Zealand	5
Vanuatu	0

=== Semi-finals ===
Winners qualified for 2017 FIFA U-20 World Cup.

13 September 2016
11:00

New Zealand	3–1	New Caledonia
Dyer 23', 30'; Cox 71'	Report	Nypie 19'

Luganville Soccer City Stadium, Luganville
Referee: Kader Zitouni (Tahiti)

13 September 2016
14:30

Vanuatu	2–1	Solomon Islands
Tenene 36'; Massing 90+4'	Report	Gise 21'

Port Vila Municipal Stadium, Port Vila
Referee: Nick Waldron (New Zealand)

=== Final ===
17 September 2016
14:30

New Zealand	5–0	Vanuatu
Ashworth 13'; Dyer 34'; Bevan 76'; Imrie 88', 90'	Report; Report (NZ Football)

Port Vila Municipal Stadium, Port Vila
Referee: Kader Zitouni (Tahiti)

== Goalscorers ==
5 goals

- (Cook Islands) Dwayne Tiputoa
- (New Zealand) Myer Bevan

4 goals

- (New Zealand) Moses Dyer
- (Samoa) Pago Tunupopo

3 goals

- (New Zealand) Lucas Imrie
- (Solomon Islands) Albert Witney
- (French Polynesia) Heirauarii Salem
- (Tonga) Hemaloto Polovili

2 goals

- (New Caledonia) Thomas Gope-Fenepej
- (Samoa) Samuelu Malo
- (Vanuatu) Godine Tenene
- (Vanuatu) Ronaldo Wilkins

1 goal

- (American Samoa) Steven Fiso
- (Cook Islands) Kimiora Samuela
- (Cook Islands) Conroy Tiputoa
- (Cook Islands) Michael Wood
- (Fiji) France Catarogo
- (Fiji) Leroy Jennings
- (New Caledonia) Warren Houala
- (New Caledonia) Cyril Nypie
- (New Caledonia) Pothin Poma
- (New Caledonia) Albert Watrone
- (New Zealand) Hunter Ashworth
- (New Zealand) Reese Cox
- (New Zealand) Clayton Lewis
- (Papua New Guinea) Alu Awi
- (Papua New Guinea) Peter Dabinyaba Jr.
- (Papua New Guinea) Gabby Yanum
- (Samoa) Timothy Hunt
- (Samoa) Frank Mariner
- (Solomon Islands) Joe Gise
- (Solomon Islands) Richard Raramo
- (Solomon Islands) Augustine Waita
- (French Polynesia) Rayan Petitgas
- (French Polynesia) Marc Siejidr
- (French Polynesia) Sandro Tau
- (Tonga) Anthony Likiliki
- (Tonga) Talatala Po'oi
- (Vanuatu) Bong Kalo
- (Vanuatu) Frederick Massing
- (Vanuatu) Jason Thomas

== Awards ==
The Golden Ball Award is awarded to the most outstanding player of the tournament. The Golden Glove Award is awarded to the best goalkeeper of the tournament. The Golden Boot Award is awarded to the top scorer of the tournament. The Fair Play Award is awarded to the team with the best disciplinary record at the tournament.

Award	Recipient
Golden Ball	(New Zealand) Myer Bevan
Golden Glove	(New Zealand) Michael Woud
Golden Boot	(New Zealand) Myer Bevan
Fair Play Award	Solomon Islands

== Qualified teams for FIFA U-20 World Cup ==
The following two teams from OFC qualified for the 2017 FIFA U-20 World Cup.

Team	Qualified on	Previous appearances in tournament^{1}
New Zealand	13 September 2016	4 (2007, 2011, 2013, 2015)
Vanuatu	13 September 2016	0 (Debut)

^{1} Bold indicates champion for that year. Italic indicates host for that year.
