= Oliver Whyte =

New Zealand footballer (born 2000)

Personal information
- Full name: Oliver Edward Brymer Whyte
- Date of birth: 20 January 2000 (age 26)
- Place of birth: Wellington, New Zealand
- Height: 1.79 m (5 ft 10 in)
- Position: Midfielder

Team information
- Current team: Haka
- Number: 77

Youth career
- –2018: Wellington Phoenix
- 2018–2019: Rio Ave

Senior career*
| Years | Team | Apps | (Gls) |
| 2015–2018 | Wellington Phoenix Reserves | 29 | (5) |
| 2018–2019 | Rio Ave | 0 | (0) |
| 2019–2020 | Team Wellington | 14 | (0) |
| 2020 | İstanbulspor | 0 | (0) |
| 2021 | Team Wellington | 6 | (1) |
| 2021 | Miramar Rangers | 28 | (16) |
| 2022–2024 | Haka | 73 | (6) |
| 2025 | Muaither | 4 | (0) |
| 2025–2026 | Manchester 62 | 9 | (2) |
| 2026- | Haka | 24 | (8) |
Medal record
Men's football
Representing New Zealand
OFC U-17 Championship
| Winner | 2017 Samoa–Tahiti |
- * Club domestic league appearances and goals as of 1 November 2026

Oliver Edward Brymer Whyte (born 20 January 2000) is a New Zealand footballer who plays as a midfielder for Veikkausliiga club Haka.

== Career ==
In 2018, Whyte joined the youth academy of Portuguese side Rio Ave from the Wellington Phoenix academy. In 2019, he was freely transferred to Team Wellington in New Zealand. In 2020, he moved to Turkish second tier club İstanbulspor.

In 2021, Whyte joined Miramar Rangers (an amateur Wellington based club). After a disappointing stint with the Wellington Phoenix Reserves he was freely transferred to Finnish club Haka.

In August 2025 White joined Manchester 62.

== Career statistics ==
As of 14 February 2025

Appearances and goals by club, season and competition
| Club | Season | League | | | Cup (Note: Includes Turkish Cup and Suomen Cup) | | League cup (Note: Includes Finnish League Cup) | | Other | | Total | |
| Club | Season | Division | Apps | Goals | Apps | Goals | Apps | Goals | Apps | Goals | Apps | Goals |
|---|---|---|---|---|---|---|---|---|---|---|---|---|
| Wellington Phoenix Reserves | 2015–16 | NZ Premiership | 3 | 1 | – | | – | | – | | 3 | 1 |
| Wellington Phoenix Reserves | 2016–17 | NZ Premiership | 8 | 0 | – | | – | | – | | 8 | 0 |
| Wellington Phoenix Reserves | 2017–18 | NZ Premiership | 18 | 4 | – | | – | | – | | 18 | 4 |
| Wellington Phoenix Reserves | Total | | 29 | 5 | 0 | 0 | 0 | 0 | 0 | 0 | 29 | 5 |
| Team Wellington | 2019–20 | NZ Premiership | 14 | 0 | – | | – | | – | | 14 | 0 |
| İstanbulspor | 2020–21 | TFF 1. Lig | 0 | 0 | 1 | 0 | – | | – | | 1 | 0 |
| Team Wellington | 2020–21 | NZ Premiership | 6 | 1 | – | | – | | – | | 6 | 1 |
| Miramar Rangers | 2021 | NZ National League | 14 | 9 | – | | – | | 6 (Note: Appearances in South Central Series) | 7 | 20 | 16 |
| Haka | 2022 | Veikkausliiga | 23 | 2 | 4 | 1 | 5 | 1 | – | | 32 | 4 |
| Haka | 2023 | Veikkausliiga | 23 | 1 | 1 | 0 | 2 | 0 | 1 (Note: Appearances in UEFA Conference League) | 0 | 27 | 1 |
| Haka | 2024 | Veikkausliiga | 27 | 3 | 6 | 5 | 4 | 1 | – | | 37 | 9 |
| Haka | Total | | 73 | 6 | 11 | 6 | 11 | 2 | 1 | 0 | 96 | 14 |
| Muaither | 2024–25 | Qatari Second Division | 4 | 0 | 1 | 0 | – | | – | | 5 | 0 |
| Manchester 62 | 2025–26 | Gibraltar Football League | 5 | 1 | 0 | 0 | – | | – | | 5 | 1 |
| Career total | | | 19 | 1 | 0 | 0 | 0 | 0 | 1 | 0 | 20 | 1 |

== Honours ==
Miramar Rangers

- New Zealand National League: 2021

Individual

- New Zealand National League Golden Boot: 2021
