= Chris James (footballer) =

New Zealand footballer

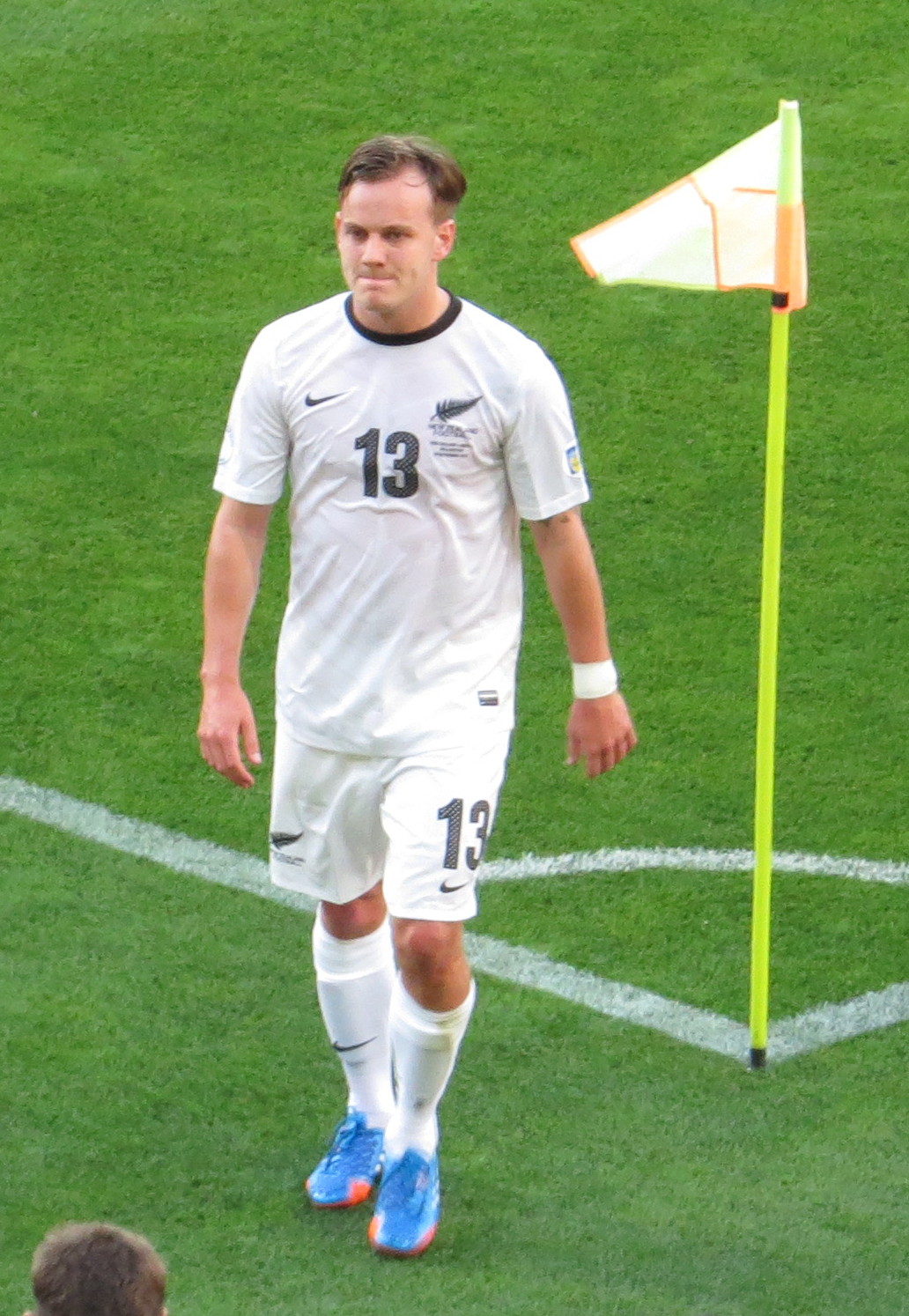
- Chris James playing for All Whites vs Mexico

Personal information
- Full name: Christopher Paul James
- Date of birth: 4 July 1987 (age 39)
- Place of birth: Wellington, New Zealand
- Height: 1.78 m (5 ft 10 in)
- Position: Midfielder

Youth career
- 2000–2005: Fulham

Senior career*
Years	Team	Apps	(Gls)
2005–2007	Fulham	0	(0)
2008–2009	Tampere United	19	(4)
2008	→ TPV (loan)	1	(0)
2009	→ FC Ilves (loan)	1	(1)
2010	Barnet	2	(0)
2011–2012	APIA Leichhardt	18	(4)
2012–2013	KuPS	40	(4)
2014–2015	Sedan	6	(0)
2015	Ekenäs IF	10	(0)
2016	FC Haka	23	(4)
2017	Colorado Springs Switchbacks	4	(1)
2017–2018	Eastern Suburbs AFC	3	(0)
2018	KTP	12	(0)
2020–2022	Klubi 04	38	(0)

International career
2002–2003	England U16	7	(0)
2003–2004	England U17	12	(1)
2005–2006	England U19	9	(0)
2006–2009	New Zealand U20	8	(7)
2006–2014	New Zealand	22	(2)

Managerial career
- 2020–: HJK Helsinki (U14 assistant)
- 2024–2026: Käpylän Pallo BSM (headcoach)
- * Club domestic league appearances and goals as of 15:27, 18 June 2020 (UTC)

Christopher Paul James (born 4 July 1987) is a retired professional football player.

James represented New Zealand at international level. James is predominantly a central midfielder or deep-lying playmaker, but is also able to play very well in offensive roles.

== Club career ==
James' first professional contract was with Premier League side Fulham. Although he never made a senior first-team appearance, he made many appearances for the reserve side. James was offered a one-year contract extension by Fulham in 2007, however James declined the offer to pursue first team opportunities elsewhere.

In February 2008, he signed a two-year contract with Tampere United. Even though the 2008 season wasn't a very successful one for his team, James debut season was impressive, in 17 league games he scored three goals and also provided eight assists in his breakthrough season. He represented Tampere United in their four Champions League Qualifiers scoring two goals.

James was signed by Football League Two side Barnet in March 2010 on a free transfer subject to international clearance. James made his first team debut as a late substitute in a 3–1 home victory over Chesterfield on 5 April 2010. James was released at the end of the season due to change of management at Barnet.

After his departure from his third Finnish side FC Haka, James was signed by second-tier American club Colorado Springs Switchbacks F.C. on a free transfer on 12 January 2017. He was officially released from the club after making only four appearances due to injuries on 27 July 2017.

On 19 November 2017, he returned to New Zealand and played for Eastern Suburbs AFC of ISPS Handa Premiership.

On 9 March 2018, he moved to Finland for KTP of Ykkönen. After he arrived to the team, he played 90 mins and scored in the next day versus PEPO Lappeenranta in 2017–18 Finnish Cup.

=== Later career ===
In January 2019, James received his UEFA B Coaching Licence. As part of his personal development, James reached out to New Zealand national under-20 football team head coach Des Buckingham, to join the preparation camp in the lead up to the FIFA U-20 World Cup where he helped the coaching staff out. Before that, he also picked up coaching experience at the academies of West Bromwich Albion and Arsenal.

In November 2019 it was confirmed, that James would play for Klubi 04, the reserve team of HJK Helsinki. Beside that, he would also function as an assistant coach to the club's U14 team.

== International career ==
James played for the England youth team representing them over 30 times at Under 16–18 levels but has now chosen to play for the country of his birth, New Zealand. Ricki Herbert included him in the All Whites squad just days after receiving international clearance to play for New Zealand for the friendly match against then-World Champions Brazil on 5 June 2006, which they lost 4–0. He has made a number of appearances for his country since his debut, playing the likes of Charlton Athletic and Sevilla in friendlies. He also scored a consolation goal against Sevilla which was calmly slotted away.

Impressive performances in these matches has won him the New Zealand Soccer International Young Men's Player of the Year award for 2006. He was a member of the New Zealand under-20 team that qualified for the under-20 World Cup in Canada, scoring seven goals in six games including a hat-trick against Samoa. It was the first time New Zealand had a team qualify for the under-20 World Cup.

James was named as part of the 2009 FIFA Confederations Cup New Zealand squad to travel to South Africa, but was not named in New Zealand's 2010 FIFA World Cup squad.

James returned to the national side for the 2013 OSN Cup.

=== International goals ===
Scores and results list New Zealand's goal tally first.

#	Date	Venue	Opponent	Score	Result	Competition	Reference
1.	13 November 2013	Estadio Azteca, Mexico City, Mexico	Mexico	1–5	1–5	2014 FIFA World Cup qualification	
2.	20 November 2013	Westpac Stadium, Wellington, New Zealand	Mexico	2–3	2–4	2014 FIFA World Cup qualification	
