= 2007 OFC U-20 Championship =

Tournament details
- Host country: New Zealand
- Dates: 19–31 January
- Teams: 7 (from 1 confederation)
- Venue: 1 (in 1 host city)

Final positions
- Champions: New Zealand (3rd title)
- Runners-up: Fiji
- Third place: Solomon Islands
- Fourth place: New Caledonia

Tournament statistics
- Matches played: 21
- Goals scored: 83 (3.95 per match)
- Top scorer: (Fiji) Roy Krishna (8 goals)
- Best player: (New Zealand) Chris James

The 2007 OFC U-20 Championship was held at the Trusts Stadium in Waitakere City, New Zealand from 19 to 31 January 2007 in a league table format. It was the first tournament in which regular Oceania powerhouse Australia were not participating, following their switch to the Asian Football Confederation (AFC).

== Referees ==
New Zealand

- (New Zealand) Michael Hester
- (New Zealand) Peter O'Leary

Papua New Guinea

- (Papua New Guinea) Minan Ponis
- (Papua New Guinea) Salaiau Sosongan

Samoa

- (Samoa) Fiti Aimaasu

Solomon Islands

- (Solomon Islands) Christopher Lengata
- (Solomon Islands) Nelson Sogo

== Venues ==
The tournament will be played at just one venue in Henderson, New Zealand; Trusts Stadium.

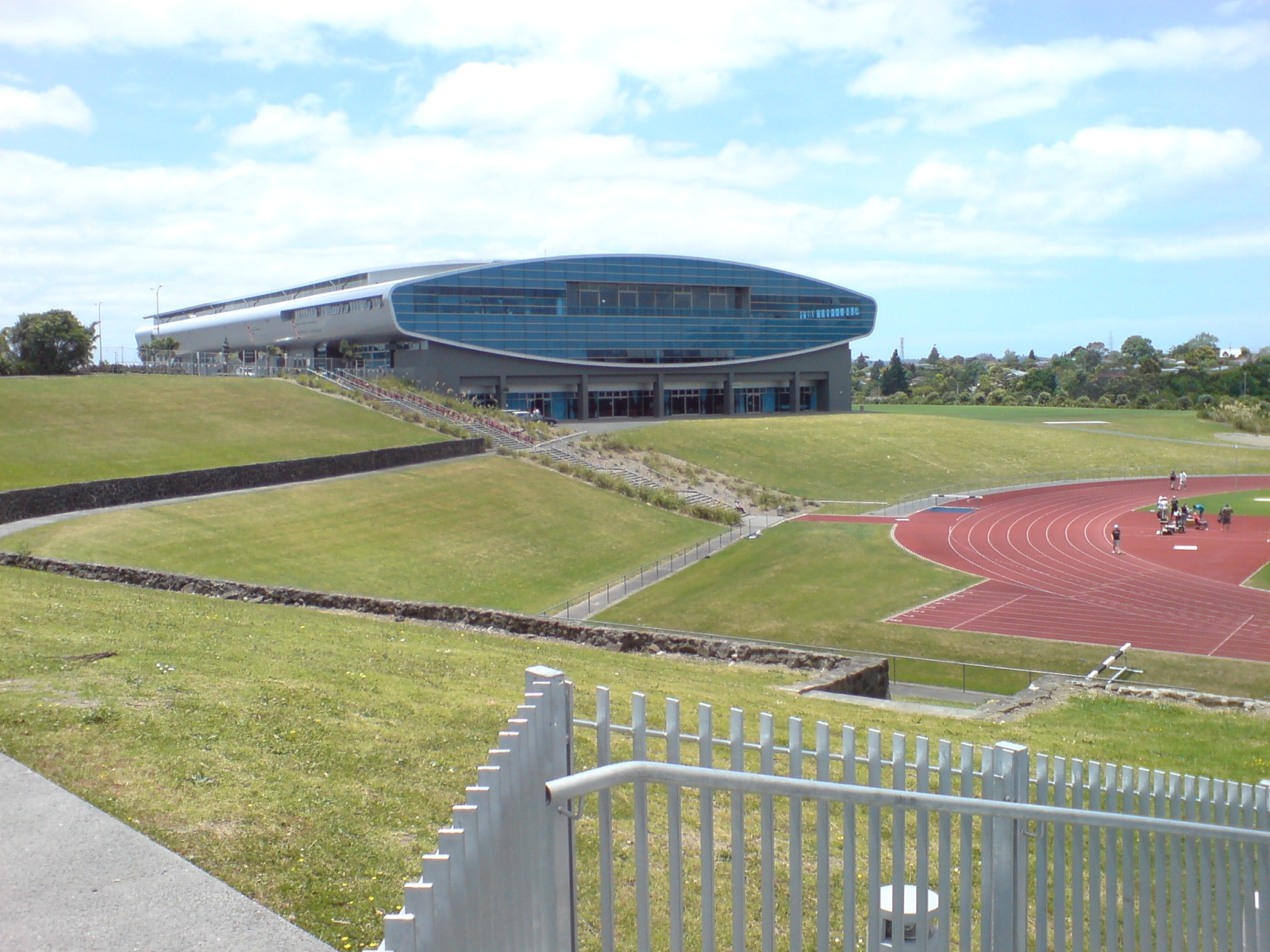
Trusts Stadium

Location: Henderson
Capacity: 4,900

== Main group ==
Team	Pts	Pld	W	D	L	GF	GA	GDF
New Zealand	16	6	5	1	0	21	4	+17
Fiji	12	6	4	0	2	16	6	+10
Solomon Islands	11	6	3	2	1	14	8	+6
New Caledonia	9	6	3	0	3	11	6	+5
Tahiti	7	6	2	1	3	9	9	0
Vanuatu	5	6	1	2	3	8	17	–9
Samoa	0	6	0	0	6	4	33	–29

Round 1

19 January 2007
12:00 UTC+12

Samoa	0–7	Fiji
		Senibuli 9'; Krishna 32', 38', 86'; Singh 24'; Underwood 69', 89'

Trusts Stadium, Auckland

19 January 2007
14:30 UTC+12

Tahiti	1–2	New Caledonia
Tereiitau 60'		Sablan 9'; Lolohea 45+1'

Trusts Stadium, Auckland

19 January 2007
17:00 UTC+12

Solomon Islands	1–1	New Zealand
Molea 28'		Jenkins 33'

Trusts Stadium, Auckland

Round 2

21 January 2007
12:00 UTC+12

Tahiti	3–1	Samoa
Wan Phook; Warren; Chan		Tino

Trusts Stadium, Auckland

21 January 2007
14:30 UTC+12

Solomon Islands	1–0	New Caledonia
Molea

Trusts Stadium, Auckland

21 January 2007
17:00 UTC+12

Fiji	2–0	Vanuatu
Naqeleca; Sami

Trusts Stadium, Auckland

Round 3

23 January 2007
12:00 UTC+12

Tahiti	2–2	Vanuatu
Hauata 56'; Tereiitau 90+1'		Boe 2'; Sakama 89'

Trusts Stadium, Auckland

23 January 2007
14:30 UTC+12

New Zealand	7–1	Samoa
Keat 2'; Jenkins 3', 57', 90'; Brockie 39'; James 50' (pen.); Cunningham 86'		Malo 42'

Trusts Stadium, Auckland

23 January 2007
17:00 UTC+12

Solomon Islands	0–3	Fiji
		Krishna 41', 58'; Singh 52'

Trusts Stadium, Auckland

Round 4

25 January 2007
12:00 UTC+12

New Caledonia	5–0	Samoa
Wahnyamalla 3'; Christophe Xenie 13'; Bowen 28', 32' own goal 62'

Trusts Stadium, Auckland

25 January 2007
14:30 UTC+12

Vanuatu	2–2	Solomon Islands
Molbet 4'; Melar 6'		Otini 45'; Rande 87'

Trusts Stadium, Auckland

25 January 2007
17:00 UTC+12

Tahiti	0–2	New Zealand
		Keat 30'; James 69'

Trusts Stadium, Auckland

Round 5

27 January 2007
12:00 UTC+12

Vanuatu	1–3	New Caledonia
John 29'		Sele 68', 85'; Wahnyamalla 72'

Trusts Stadium, Auckland

27 January 2007
14:30 UTC+12

Tahiti	1–2	Solomon Islands
Degage 88'		Rande 55'; Otini 66'

Trusts Stadium, Auckland

27 January 2007
17:00 UTC+12

New Zealand	3–2	Fiji
Chris James 43' (pen.); Keat 56', 77'		Krishna 8', 68' (pen.)

Trusts Stadium, Auckland

Round 6

29 January 2007
12:00 UTC+12

Solomon Islands	8–1	Samoa
Otini 27'; Molea 31', 89' (pen.); Nawo 45', 45+', 66'; Rande 86', 87'		49' (o.g.)

Trusts Stadium, Auckland

29 January 2007
14:30 UTC+12

New Caledonia	1–2	Fiji
Sele 68'		Krishna 37'; Prasad 79'

Trusts Stadium, Auckland

29 January 2007
17:00 UTC+12

Vanuatu	0–7	New Zealand
		Edginton 2'; James 15', 24', 51'; Brockie 19'; Peverley 32'; Cunningham 62'

Trusts Stadium, Auckland

Round 7

31 January 2007
12:00 UTC+12

Tahiti	2–0	Fiji
Chan 23', 65'

Trusts Stadium, Auckland

31 January 2007
14:30 UTC+12

Vanuatu	3–1	Samoa
Namariau 9'; Kaltak 17'; Natou 74'		Tokuma 6'

Trusts Stadium, Auckland

31 January 2007
17:00 UTC+12

New Zealand	1–0	New Caledonia
James 90+4'

Trusts Stadium, Auckland

== Winners ==
2007 OFC U-20 Championship winners

New Zealand
Third title

New Zealand qualified for the 2007 FIFA U-20 World Cup.

== Awards ==
Golden Boot	Golden Ball
(Fiji) Roy Krishna	(New Zealand) Chris James

== Goalscorers ==
Roy Krishna received the Golden Boot award for scoring eight goals in the tournament. In total, 81 goals were scored (one of which was an own goal).

8 goals

- (Fiji) Roy Krishna (FIJ)

6 goals

- (New Zealand) Chris James (NZL)

4 goals

- (New Zealand) Dan Keat (NZL)
- (New Zealand) Sam Jenkins (NZL)
- (Solomon Islands) Judd Molea (SOL)

3 goals

- (New Zealand) Jeremy Brockie (NZL)
- (New Caledonia) Richard Sele (NCL)
- (Solomon Islands) Joachim Rande (SOL)
- (Solomon Islands) Joses Nawo (SOL)
- (Solomon Islands) Tony Otini (SOL)
- (French Polynesia) Leon Chan (TAH)

2 goals

- (New Zealand) Michael Cunningham (NZL)
- (Fiji) Alvin Singh (FIJ)
- (Fiji) Eran Underwood (FIJ)
- (New Caledonia) Jean Christophe Xenie (NCL)
- (New Caledonia) Ulrich Bowen (NCL)
- (New Caledonia) Jean Wahnyamalla (NCL)
- (Vanuatu) Francois Sakama (VAN)
- (French Polynesia) Ariihau Tereiitau (TAH)

1 goal

- (New Zealand) Phil Edginton (NZL)
- (New Zealand) Cole Peverley (NZL)
- (Fiji) Krishna Samy (FIJ)
- (Fiji) Esava Naqeleca (FIJ)
- (Fiji) Meneusi Senibuli (FIJ)
- (Fiji) Rinal Prasad (FIJ)
- (New Caledonia) Cesar Lolohea (NCL)
- (New Caledonia) Jason Sablan (NCL)
- (Samoa) Dominiko Tokuma (SAM)
- (Samoa) Silao Malo (SAM)
- (Samoa) Ionatana Tino (SAM)
- (French Polynesia) Tefai Faehau (TAH)
- (French Polynesia) Teiki Wan Phook (TAH)
- (French Polynesia) Matahi Hauata (TAH)
- (French Polynesia) Roihau Degage (TAH)
- (Vanuatu) Michel Kaltak (VAN)
- (Vanuatu) Elton Boe (VAN)
- (Vanuatu) Simon Molbet (VAN)
- (Vanuatu) Jeffry Nimanian (VAN)
- (Vanuatu) Brian Melar (VAN)
- (Vanuatu) Daniel Natou (VAN)

Own goals

- (Samoa) (playing against New Caledonia)

== See also ==
- 2007 FIFA U-20 World Cup
