= Sam Jenkins (footballer) =

New Zealand footballer (born 1987)

Personal information
- Full name: Samuel David Jenkins
- Date of birth: 17 February 1987 (age 39)
- Place of birth: Napier, New Zealand
- Height: 5 ft 11 in (1.80 m)
- Position: Midfielder

Senior career*
Years	Team	Apps	(Gls)
2000–2007	Napier City Rovers	57	(34)
2004–2008	Hawke's Bay United	61	(10)
2008	→ Western Suburbs FC	7	(9)
2008–2009	Team Wellington-	15	(0)
2010	Miramar Rangers	24	(17)
2011	Central United		

International career^{‡}
2006–2007	New Zealand U20	11	(7)
2008	New Zealand U23	10	(0)
- * Club domestic league appearances and goals as of 13 April 2008 ‡ National team caps and goals as of 21 November 2008

Samuel David Jenkins (born 17 February 1987) is a New Zealand former footballer.

== Club career ==
Jenkins started off his club career for Napier City Rovers in the year 2001. He progressed through the Junior ranks to the 1st team where he made 67 appearances scoring 34 goals from Midfield.

In 2004 aged 17 whilst still at School he signed for Napier in the inaugural 2004–05 New Zealand Football Championship. He has since made over 60 appearances for Hawkes Bay in the NZFC scoring 10 goals.

In 2007, he looked at attending college in the United States while playing for an NCAA team as a student-athlete. He took visits to Rutgers University and the University of California, Santa Barbara. He ultimately committed to enroll at UC Santa Barbara and play soccer for the UC Santa Barbara Gauchos alongside Michael Boxall, his New Zealand national under-20 football team teammate for the 2007 FIFA U-20 World Cup. He would ultimately renege on his commitment and in 2008 while based in Wellington training for the Olympics, he signed for Western Suburbs FC where he made 7 appearances scoring 9 goals.

== International career ==
Jenkins has represented New Zealand at under-20 and under-23. His first cap for the NZ Under 20s was against Australia in Sydney in May 2006 where he scored the winning goal in a 1–0 win for New Zealand. He then scored a double two days later to help New Zealand to a 3–1 win over Australia and their first ever series win. He was third top goal scorer (4) at Oceania World Cup Qualifying tournament in January 2007 in Auckland where he helped New Zealand qualify for the 2007 FIA Under-20 World Cup in Canada. He started all three matches in Canada against Portugal (0–2), The Gambia (0–1) and Mexico (1–2) and was one of New Zealand's stand out players.

In 2008, he was called into the New Zealand under 23 Olympic team for matches against Chile in Wellington which saw New Zealand gain their first ever win (1-0) against South American opposition on home soil. He was included in the New Zealand squad for the football tournament at the Summer Olympics in Beijing becoming New Zealand Olympian 1050. He played in New Zealand's three group matches against China (1–1), Brazil (0–5) and Belgium (0–1).

== Personal ==
Grew up in Napier, New Zealand with his family, Mum (Jude), his late father (Dave) and his younger sister Chloe. He attended Porrit Primary School, Tamatea Intermediate and Napier Boys High School where he excelled at both cricket (represented both Hawkes Bay and Central Districts while at School) and soccer.
