= 2021 Papua New Guinea National Soccer League =

Papua New Guinea football season

Papua New Guinea National Soccer League
- Season: 2021
- Dates: July 24 – TBA

The 2021 Papua New Guinea National Soccer League, for sponsorship reasons also known as the Kumul Petroleum Holdings Limited National Soccer League, is the 15th edition of the Papua New Guinea National Soccer League, the top-tier football league in Papua New Guinea. The league started on 24 July.

The defending champions are Lae City, who won their sixth consecutive title with a 1–0 victory over Vitiaz United in the previous season's Grand Final.

== Format ==
After initially deciding the league format would be the same as the previous season – one national league consisting of ten teams – the Papua New Guinea Football Association and NSL board eventually reverted to a format that they had previously used in the 2015–16 season, splitting the league into two regional divisions, a Northern Conference and a Southern Conference, each with seven teams.

== Clubs ==
Seven clubs returned from the previous season: six-time reigning champions Lae City, eight-time champions Hekari United, fourth-placed side Komara Gulf, Morobe United, Morobe Wawens, Star Mountain and Tusbab Stallions. Grand Final runners-up Vitiaz United withdrew, citing financial difficulties. Kutubu and Bougainville also withdrew from the league. A phoenix side, Lae City Dwellers, led by sacked Lae City FC coach Peter Gunemba, announced their return to the league in May 2021, although there was an element of confusion as to which of the two sides had the right to claim the franchise's previous titles. There were returns to the league for Tavur FC (also known as WNB Tavur), Sepik FC, and Port Moresby Strikers (also known as Southern Strikers), while Central Dabari FC was a late acceptance into the league. There was also room for two development sides in each of the conferences.

Papua New Guinea National Soccer League 2021
Northern Conference
Team	Previous best	Other honours
Lae City FC	2015–20: Champions (6x)	2018, 2019 OFC Champions League: Quarter-finalists
Morobe United	2009–10: Runners-up	1998 National Club Championship: Runners-up 2001, 2005 Lae Regional Championship: Champions
Morobe Wawens	2018: 3rd	None
Tusbab Stallions	2019–20: 6th	None
Sepik FC	2008–09: 7th	None
Lae City Dwellers	N/A	None
Northern Youth FC	N/A	None
Southern Conference
Team	Previous best	Other honours
Hekari United	2006–14: Champions (8x)	2009–10 OFC Champions League: Champions 2017 National Premier League: Champions 2007 Port Moresby Premier League: Champions
Komara Gulf	2019–20: 4th	2018 National Premier League: Champions
Port Moresby Strikers	2018: 5th	None
Star Mountain	2019–20: 7th	1999 North Fly District: Champions
Tavur FC	2013: 7th	None
Central Dabari	2019: Southern Conference: 5th	None
Southern Youth FC	N/A	None
