= F.C. Bougainville =

Association football club in Papua New Guinea

Bougainville
- Full name: Football Club Bougainville
- Founded: 2018; 8 years ago
- Chairman: Thomas Taberia
- Manager: David Passam
- League: National Soccer League
- 2019–20: 5th

FC Bougainville was a semi-professional association football club based in the Autonomous Region of Bougainville. The club was founded in 2018.

The club took part in the 2019–20 edition of the Papua New Guinea National Soccer League, finishing 5th.

== History ==
The club was founded shortly before the 2019 Papua New Guinea National Soccer League season, with the aim to 'promote peace' in the Bougainville region, according to coach David Passam. The club recruited players from Port Moresby Soccer Association champions Mungkas and University Inter, as well as four from the Bougainville region itself. The club was then drawn into the Southern Conference.

The club was handed a tough start to the season, going up against eight-time champions Hekari United on the opening day, and played well in a 1–0 defeat. They registered their first win on the second weekend of the season with a 2–1 victory over former runners-up Eastern Stars, but were inconsistent throughout the first half of the season, winning three games and losing three, with a solitary draw against struggling Southern Strikers. By the half-way stage of the season, the club sat fourth in the league.

Another narrow 1–0 defeat to Hekari followed, before a damaging 2–1 defeat against playoff rivals Central United threatened to derail their qualification hopes. However, victories against Port Moresby United and Star Mountain left them one point off qualification with two games to play. However, a final day defeat to playoff rivals Eastern Stars finally ended their challenge, and the side finished 4th.

The side were one of ten teams entered in to the 2019–20 National Soccer League, and once again, they were challengers for qualification to the playoffs throughout the season. At the halfway stage, the club sat fifth in the regular season table, five points behind fourth-placed Tusbab Stallions, and during the enforced break due to the COVID-19 pandemic in the country, the side hired former Papua New Guinea U-23 manager Percy Mataio to take over as head coach. However, following two consecutive defeats to Hekari United and Star Mountain, Mataio left the club for unknown reasons, and the side were left managerless for a 9–2 defeat to reigning champions Lae City on 22 August. Former head coach David Passam resumed his duties, and the side didn't lose for the remainder of the season – three consecutive victories against Morobe United, Tusbab Stallions and Vitiaz United, and a goalless draw against FC Kutubu, saw them enter the final day within reach of the playoffs. A 4–1 victory over Morobe Wawens meant that they had done all they could, but a final-day victory for playoff rivals Gulf Komara saw them stay ahead of them, with Bougainville eventually finishing the season in 5th place.

== Domestic record ==
=== National competitions ===
- Papua New Guinea National Soccer League
  - 2019: Southern Conference: 4th
  - 2019–20: 5th
