= Port Moresby United =

Association football club in Port Moresby

- Full name: Port Moresby United Football Club
- Founded: 2018
- Manager: Francis Moyap
- League: National Soccer League
- 2019: Southern Conference: 3rd

Port Moresby United was a semi-professional association football club based in Port Moresby, Papua New Guinea. The club was founded in 2018. The club took part in the 2019 edition of the Papua New Guinea National Soccer League, and finished third in the Southern Conference.

== History ==
The side was founded in late 2018 to act as a flagship team for the National Capital District of Port Moresby, backed by NCD governor Powes Parkop. Under coach Francis Moyap, the side entered the 2019 Papua New Guinea National Soccer League as one of eight teams in the Southern Conference.

The side won their opening fixture against the NSL veterans Eastern Stars, securing a 2–1 victory thanks to goals from Iamo Maneke and Chris David. The side continued to play well, winning five of their seven fixtures in the first half of the regular season, losing only once, to eight-time champions Hekari United 1–0. They went into the halfway stage in second place, six points clear of Gulf Komara in third.

Their form began to stutter into the second half of the regular season, starting with a 3–0 defeat against a much-improved Eastern Stars. More dropped points followed, with a draw against Southern Strikers and a damaging defeat against playoff rivals FC Bougainville saw their playoff cushion cut to three points with three matches remaining. Their form continued to trail off, but the side was still able to qualify with a win on the final day against 7th-placed Star Mountain. However, a late goal from Mountain denied them a place in the playoffs.

== Domestic record ==
=== National competitions ===
- Papua New Guinea National Soccer League
  - 2019: Southern Conference: 3rd
