= Markham F.C. =

Association football team in Papua New Guinea

Markham
- Full name: Markham Football Club
- Founded: 2017
- League: National Soccer League
- 2019: Northern Conference: 6th

Markham FC was a semi-professional association football team based in the Markham District of Papua New Guinea. The club was founded in 2017, although it may have existed in some form before 2007.

The club's finest achievement to date was their third-place finish in the 2017 edition of the Papua New Guinea National Premier League, during which they finished top of the Northern Conference.

== History ==
The club's first recorded domestic competition was the inaugural edition of the Papua New Guinea National Premier League. Their participation was confirmed in April 2017. However, the local newspaper, The National, reported them as having spent a 'decade in the doldrums', indicating the club may have existed prior to this time.

The club was drawn into the Northern Conference, and started slowly, losing 3–1 on the opening day against Jessa Nawaeb FC. However, eight victories and just one more defeat, against Laiwaden FC, enabled the side to finish top of the conference and qualify for the playoffs, after winning two matches on two consecutive days on 10–11 June 2017. The club were pegged back after leading against Papaka FC in the semi-final, eventually losing on penalties after missing all of their spot-kicks, before defeating Jessa Nawaeb 1–0 in the third-place playoff.

The club were confirmed as participants in the 2018 edition of the NPL in December 2017, and were once again drawn in the Northern Conference alongside three other teams – Morobe FC, Jessa Nawaeb and Laiwaden. The tournament took place on one weekend in February 2018. The club were beaten to first by Morobe after a 3–2 defeat and finished second, qualifying for the third-place match against Hekari United. They were defeated 5–1.

On 18 January 2019, it was confirmed that the side would be making their debut in the Papua New Guinea National Soccer League ahead of the 2019 season. They were drawn into the Northern Conference, alongside several teams they had faced in the National Premier League – namely Laiwaden FC, Morobe FC and Lahi United – as well as four-time champions Toti City. They opened their season with a 0–0 draw against Lahi United, before a 2–1 victory over Tusbab Stallions on the second matchday. However, their form deteriorated thereafter, picking up one point in the next six games. Victories over Morobe Wawens and Tusbab in the second half of the season allowed them to finish 6th.

== Honours ==
=== National competitions ===
- Papua New Guinea National Premier League
  - Third place: 2017
