= Radazz F.C. =

Football club from East New Britain, PNG

Radazz
- Full name: Rabaul Radazz Football Club
- Founded: 2018
- Manager: Spencer Manhi
- League: Papua New Guinea National Soccer League
- 2019: Islands Conference: 3rd

Rabaul Radazz FC was a semi-professional association football club based in Kokopo, East New Britain, Papua New Guinea. The club was founded in 2018.

The club took part in the 2019 edition of the Papua New Guinea National Soccer League, their national stage competition debut. They finished 3rd in the Islands Conference.

== History ==
The club was founded sometime in 2018, and hosted a friendly match against eight-time domestic champions Hekari United in April 2018. The visitors won 5–1, but the hosts won praise from Hekari's coach Erickson Komeng for keeping the score goalless for the first half an hour. In early 2019, it was revealed that Radazz were one of five teams entered into the new Islands Conference of the 2019 Papua New Guinea National Soccer League. The teams consisted of players from across the East New Britain province, and were sponsored by Warangoi Properties.

The team struggled to find their feet in the opening half of the season, losing their opening two matches against Chebu AROB FC and West Tribe FC, before picking up their first victory against Gazelle FC, winning 3–0. A draw with Greengold Liners saw them enter the halfway stage in fourth place. However, the team rebounded, securing return victories against Chebu and Tribe, before a draw with Gazelle and victory against Greengold saw them enter the final day in second place. However, having played all their matches, they could only watch as playoff rivals Chebu and West Tribe won their final day fixtures, knocking them down to third place.

== Domestic record ==
=== National competitions ===
- Papua New Guinea National Soccer League
  - 2019: Islands Conference: 3rd
