= Enga Laima F.C. =

Association football club in Papua New Guinea

Enga Laima
- Full name: Enga Laima Football Club
- Founded: 2019
- League: Papua New Guinea National Soccer League
- 2019: Highlands Conference: 5th

Enga Laima FC was a semi-professional association football club based in Wabag in the Enga Province of Papua New Guinea. The club was founded in 2019.

The club's competitive debut was in the 2019 edition of the Papua New Guinea National Soccer League, where they finished 5th out of six teams in the Highlands Conference.

== History ==
In early January 2019, it was reported that a club called Laima FC, supported by Enga Governor Sir Peter Ipatas, had entered into the 2019 edition of the Papua New Guinea National Soccer League. By the start of the season, the name had been adjusted to Enga Laima FC.

In their opening match, the club lost 5–0 to Aporo Mai, before an 11–1 defeat at the hands of Kagua-Erave. The only point the side was able to collect in the opening half of the season was a 2–2 draw with Simbu Angra. The side forfeited their scheduled return fixture against Aporo Mai, but showed marked signs of improvement in their final three matches – they picked up their first win of the season against Blue Kumuls on 6 April, before a 1–0 victory over Kagua-Erave lifted them off the foot of the table. They finished the season with a 3–1 victory over Mount Hagen FC, denying their opponents qualification to the playoff stage.

== Domestic record ==
=== National competitions ===
- Papua New Guinea National Soccer League
  - 2019: Highlands Conference: 5th
