= Central United F.C. (Papua New Guinea) =

Association football club in Central Province, PNG

Central Dabari
- Full name: Central United Football Club
- Founded: 2018; 7 years ago
- Chairman: Morea Vavine; Kamo Kini
- League: Papua New Guinea National Soccer League
- 2021: TBA

Central Dabari FC, sometimes known as Central United, is a professional association football club based in Central Province, Papua New Guinea. The club was established in 2018.

The club has first taken part in the 2019 edition of the Papua New Guinea National Soccer League, having been drawn into the Southern Conference.

== History ==
The club was launched on 14 December 2018 at a fundraising dinner in Port Moresby. Co-owner Kamo Kini suggested that the club would be made up of players from rural areas within the Central Province, given that several players from this region had achieved success in the past, including PNG internationals Kema Jack, David Aua and Patrick Aisa. Before the start of the 2019 Papua New Guinea National Soccer League season, the club held a sevens tournament in Kaparoko village.

The club was confirmed into the Southern Conference of the Papua New Guinea National Soccer League in January 2019, and won their opening match against the more experienced Gulf Komara 2–1, with goals from Sebastian Kepi and Opu Karo. The team continued this good start with three wins from their opening five matches, including one against former league runners-up Eastern Stars, but consecutive 2–0 defeats, to eight-time champions Hekari United and FC Bougainville, left them fifth at the half-way stage of the season.

2–1 victories against playoff rivals Komara and Bougainville at the end of March put them in a good position to challenge for qualification to the next stage of the competition, but another defeat to Hekari followed by a 6–2 defeat at the hands of Eastern Stars – after having been 2–0 ahead – put their qualification in doubt. A 6–1 defeat against Port Moresby United ended their qualification hopes, and the club eventually finished 5th in the conference.

They were expected to take part in the 2019–20 edition of the competition, but were not one of the ten teams announced in December 2019.

== Domestic record ==
=== National competitions ===
- Papua New Guinea National Soccer League
  - 2019: Southern Conference: 5th
