= Lae City Dwellers (2021) =

- Full name: Lae City Dwellers Football Club
- Short name: LCD
- Founded: 2021; 5 years ago
- Ground: Sir Ignatius Kilage Stadium
- Capacity: 1,500
- Head coach: Peter Gunemba
- League: Papua New Guinea Premier Soccer League
- 2025: PSL, 9th of 11
Home colours	Away colours

Lae City Dwellers, also known as Lae City Dwellers FC, is a Papua New Guinean professional soccer club based in Lae, competing in the Papua New Guinea Premier Soccer League. The club was formed in 2021 and is not to be confused with Lae City F.C., which was itself known as "Lae City Dwellers" between 2014 and 2017.

== History ==
=== Formation ===
In March 2020, Lae City FC owner Ian Chow dismissed head coach Peter Gunemba, replacing him with Bob Morris. Ahead of the 2021 season, it was reported that Gunemba would return to the Papua New Guinea National Soccer League with a new club, registered under the name "Lae City Dwellers" — the same name Lae City FC had used before renaming to "Toti City" for sponsorship reasons in 2017. Gunemba was joined by his sons Troy and Raymond, the latter a Papua New Guinea international who had captained Lae City FC under his father, along with other players from the squad's earlier title-winning years. Both clubs' claims to represent the "true" Lae City side made the fixture between them one of the league's fiercest local derbies from the outset.

=== 2021–2023: early seasons ===
The new club was placed in the Northern Conference for the revived two-conference 2021 season, alongside Lae City FC. The two sides met for the first time on 31 July 2021, with Lae City FC winning the derby 4–1. The 2021 season was ultimately abandoned without a champion being crowned amid a resurgence of COVID-19 cases in the country.

The club's first completed campaign came in the regionalised 2022–23 season, in which it finished third of six teams in the Northern Conference and did not advance to the national quarter-finals. In the 2023 season, the club's best to date, it finished third in the regular-season table before eliminating Port Moresby Strikers in the semi-finals to reach the grand final, where it lost 1–0 to Hekari United.

=== 2024–present ===
The club finished seventh of eight clubs in the 2024 season, winning four of its 14 matches. In the 2025 season, the club finished ninth of eleven and came close to withdrawing from the competition after a dispute over a K40,000 registration fee; head coach Peter Gunemba said the squad had faced financial difficulties throughout the campaign. The club is competing in the 2026 season.

== League history ==
Season	League	Pos.	Pld	W	D	L	F	A	Pts	Playoffs
2021	NSL, Northern Conf.	Season abandoned								
2022	NSL, Northern Conf.	3rd	10	4	2	4	19	12	14	Did not qualify
2023	PSL	3rd	14	7	3	4	25	18	24	Runners-up
2024	PSL	7th	14	4	2	8	21	33	14	Did not qualify
2025	PSL	9th	19	3	1	15	30	46	10	Did not qualify
2026	PSL	Season in progress								

Table sourced to RSSSF

== Honours ==
- Papua New Guinea Premier Soccer League
  - Runners-up: 2023
