= Bob Morris (football manager) =

Papua New Guinean football manager (died 2026)

Personal information
- Place of birth: Papua New Guinea
- Date of death: 14 October 2026

International career
Years	Team	Apps	(Gls)
- Papua New Guinea

Managerial career
- Besta PNG United
- Madang
- Papua New Guinea U23
- 2019: Laiwaden
- 2019–2021: Papua New Guinea
- 2020: Morobe Wawens
- 2020–2021: Lae City
- 2026: Papua New Guinea

Bob Morris (died 14 October 2026) was a Papua New Guinean football manager.

== Managerial career ==
In October 2015, Morris was appointed Madang manager, after previously managing Besta PNG United. Ahead of the 2019 Pacific Games, Morris was named manager of Papua New Guinea. In 2020, Morris was appointed manager of Papua New Guinea National Soccer League club Morobe Wawens, after spending the previous season with Laiwaden. In the same year, Morris was appointed manager of Lae City.

== Death ==
Morris died on 14 October 2026.
