= 2019 Papua New Guinea National Soccer League =

Soccer league

Papua New Guinea National Soccer League
- Season: 2019
- Dates: 26 January – 1 June
- Champions: Toti City FC (5th title)
- OFC Champions League: Toti City FC; Hekari United

The 2019 Papua New Guinea National Soccer League, known for sponsorship reasons as the Kumul Petroleum Holdings Limited National Soccer League, was the 13th edition of Papua New Guinea National Soccer League, the top-tier football league in Papua New Guinea. It started on 26 January 2019. Toti City F.C. were the defending champions.

The title was won by Toti City, who picked up their fifth title after defeating eight-time champions Hekari United in the final on penalties.

== Format ==
A brand new format for the competition was announced on 19 November 2018, with the league being split into the four regions of the country: Northern (Momase), Southern (Papua), Highlands and Islands. Each league ran simultaneously, and the top two teams from each conference will qualify for the playoffs.

In the quarter-finals, the conference winners played at home against the conference runners-up, with the Northern Conference teams drawn against those from the Highlands Conference, and the Southern Conference teams against those from the Islands Conference. The winners proceeded to the semi-finals, with two home and away legs. The winning two sides proceeded to the Grand Final, with both teams then eligible to represent Papua New Guinea at the 2020 OFC Champions League.

== Teams ==
On 18 January 2019, 28 teams were confirmed as taking part. This was reduced to 27 after Admiralty FC withdrew.

Four teams returned following the 2018 season: champions Toti City FC, regular season runners-up FC Morobe Wawens, 2018 grand finalists Besta PNG United, and Southern Strikers, all except the latter being drawn into the Northern Conference. Following the league split, five teams returned to the NSL after at least two years' absence, including eight-time champions Hekari United, two-time runners-up Eastern Stars, former runners up and four-time third-placed Morobe United, and PRK Gulf Komara (previously Erema FC). Furthermore, three clubs who had taken part in the two editions of the breakaway National Premier League entered the NSL for the first time: 2017 Northern Conference champions Markham FC, Lahi FC and Laiwaden FC. The rest of the teams – sixteen in total, including all the teams in the Highlands and Islands Conference – were debutants.

Papua New Guinea National Soccer League 2019
Northern Conference
Team	Previous best	Other honours
Toti City FC	2015, 2015–16, 2017, 2018: Champions	2018 OFC Champions League: Quarter-finalists
Morobe United FC	2009–10: Runners-up	1998 National Club Championship: Runners-Up 2001, 2005 Lae Regional Championship: Champions
Besta PNG United	2018: Runners-up	None
FC Morobe Wawens	2018: 3rd	None
Markham FC	N/A	2017 National Premier League: Third place
Lahi FC	N/A	None
Laiwaden FC	N/A	None
Tusbab Stallions	N/A	None
Southern Conference
Team	Previous best	Other honours
Hekari United	2006–14: Champions (8x)	2009–10 OFC Champions League: Champions 2017 National Premier League: Champions 2007 Port Moresby Premier League: Champions
Eastern Stars	2010–11, 2011–12: Runners-Up	None
PRK Gulf Komara	2015–16: Southern Conference: 4th	2018 National Premier League: Champions
Southern Strikers	2018: 5th	None
Star Mountain FC	N/A	1999 North Fly District: Champions
Port Moresby United	N/A	None
Central United	N/A	None
FC Bougainville	N/A	None
Highlands Conference
Team	Previous best	Other honours
Blue Kumuls	N/A	2005 National Club Championship: 4th
Aporo Mai FC	N/A	None
Enga Laima FC	N/A	None
Kagua Erave FC	N/A	None
Mt Hagen FC	N/A	None
Simbu Angra FC	N/A	None
Islands Conference
Team	Previous best	Other honours
West Tribe FC	N/A	None
Greengold Liners	N/A	None
Chebu AROB FC	N/A	None
Radazz FC	N/A	None
Gazelle FC	N/A	None

Locations of 2019 Papua New Guinea National Soccer League teams

== Summary ==
The Southern Conference kicked off on 26 January 2019, the first of the four conferences to begin. Hekari United played their first NSL match for almost three years, winning 1–0 against debutants FC Bougainville, while there were opening day wins for debutants Central United and Port Moresby United. Both of the latter started strongly before Central United faded, while Port Moresby United went into the mid-season break in second with 16 points, five behind leaders Hekari, who had won seven games from seven, and four ahead of Bougainville on 12. Gulf Komara and Central sat fourth and fifth on 10 points. Two-time runners-up Eastern Stars had struggled to find their feet upon their return to the league, losing three of their opening four games before a minor recovery saw them into the halfway point in sixth with nine points.

It soon became clear that Hekari would be the runaway winners, while the battle for the second qualification spot was far less predictable. By mid-April, with three games to play, any of the sides from second to sixth could still clinch the second spot, although it was Port Moresby United who had retained the advantage, still sitting three points clear of Central United in third. On 20 April, second-placed Port Moresby lost 4–1 to leaders Hekari, while Central were thrashed 6–2 by a resurgent Eastern Stars, thanks in part to four goals from Tau Winnie, and by the final day, Central were out of contention completely following a 6–1 defeat to Port Moresby United on the penultimate week of fixtures. On the last day, Port Moresby United needed just a win against second-from-bottom Star Mountain to qualify behind Hekari, but they were held to a shock 3–3 draw, meaning the winner of Bougainville and Eastern Stars would clinch second spot. A late own goal decided the match 1–0 in Eastern Stars' favour, completing an excellent second half of the season for the Milne Bay side.

The first half of the Northern Conference was disrupted slightly by Toti City and Morobe Wawens' participation in the 2019 OFC Champions League. Both sides were able to play their opening fixture alongside the rest of the teams, with Toti City winning 3–1 against Morobe United and Wawens suffering a narrow 4–3 defeat at the hands of Besta PNG United. Both sides missed the next three rounds of fixtures, with Wawens dropping to the foot of the table and Toti to sixth as a result, with Morobe United leading the way having won their next three matches, including a narrow 1–0 win over current runners-up Besta PNG. Toti soon recovered, however, and by the halfway stage, they were on top of the league with seven wins from seven. Morobe United looked certain to join them in the playoffs, sitting second on 18 points, with Laiwaden FC third with 10.

A second-half-of-the-season surge from Besta PNG United almost threatened to disrupt the placings of the top two, with Besta winning all seven of their second-half fixtures, including a 1–0 win over Toti on 13 April, and a 3–2 victory over Morobe United the following weekend. However, this was to be Toti's only defeat of the regular season, while Morobe did enough to hold off the advances of their rivals and qualify behind the reigning champions.

The Highlands Conference kicked off on 10 February, with Aporo Mai taking the early lead following a 5–0 opening day victory over Enga Laima. Laima suffered another heavy defeat the following weekend to Kagua-Erave, losing 11–1, and Aporo Mai's 4–2 defeat to Blue Kumuls allowed Kagua-Erave to go top of the table. Five wins from five saw Kagua lead the way at the halfway stage, with Mount Hagen FC in second on 10 points, and Blue Kumuls in third on seven.

On 23 March, Blue Kumuls defeated Mount Hagen 2–0, going level on points in second place and setting up a close race for the second playoff spot behind Kagua-Erave. However, fourth-placed Aporo Mai threatened to upstage them both, inflicting a 1–0 defeat on previously undefeated Kagua-Erave the following weekend, and securing a 2–1 victory over Blue Kumuls on the first weekend of April. This left Aporo Mai four points behind Kumuls and Hagen with a game in hand and two weeks to go. However, a 2–1 defeat to playoff rivals Mount Hagen on the penultimate matchday ended their challenge.

With points tied on the final day of fixtures, Blue Kumuls went into their final match against Kagua-Erave knowing victory would guarantee qualification for the playoffs, while Mount Hagen needed to better Kumuls' result against Enga Laima. Despite Kagua-Erave securing a 1–0 victory over Blue Kumuls, Mount Hagen were unable to capitalise, losing 3–1 to Enga Laima and missing out on the playoffs on goal difference.

The Islands Conference was the last to kick-off, starting on 24 February. Chebu AROB FC secured an opening-day 4–0 victory over Radazz FC, while West Tribe FC and Greengold Liners played out a 0–0 draw. West Tribe and Chebu AROB had a strong first half of the season, sitting first and second respectively after both sides won all their matches, excepting Tribe's 1–0 victory over Chebu on 9 March. However, Radazz FC came back strongly in the second half, securing 3–2 victories over Tribe and Chebu on consecutive weekends, propelling them into second, with Chebu a point behind with a game in hand. However, on 20 April, they could only manage a 2–2 draw against bottom side Gazelle FC, while Chebu secured a vital 3–2 win over West Tribe. Radazz completed their season with a 2–1 win after Greengold Liners, and sat second ahead of West Tribe by a point and behind the already qualified Chebu AROB, but having played a game more than both sides. As such, they could only watch as West Tribe played out their final fixture: a 5–1 thrashing of Gazelle, meaning that they and league winners Chebu would qualify for the playoffs.

In the playoffs, all four Highlands and Islands teams were eliminated by Northern and Southern Conference sides, with reigning champions Toti City defeating Blue Kumuls 8–1 thanks to a double hat-trick from Raymond Gunemba. In the two-legged semi-finals, previous champions Hekari United and Toti City came out on top against their conference rivals Eastern Stars and Morobe United respectively, before a penalty shoot-out decided the final in Toti City's favour after a 0–0 draw, allowing them to win their fifth consecutive league title.

== Regular season ==
=== Northern Conference ===
Matches took place at the Sir Ignatius Kilage Stadium, Lae, and the Laiwaden Oval, Madang.

Pos	Team	Pld	W	D	L	GF	GA	GD	Pts	Qualification or relegation
1	Toti City (Q)	14	12	1	1	48	13	+35	37	Qualification to Playoffs
2	Morobe United (Q)	13	9	2	2	36	13	+23	29	Qualification to Playoffs
3	Besta PNG United	14	9	1	4	31	24	+7	28	
4	Lahi FC	13	4	3	6	19	32	−13	15	
5	Laiwaden FC	13	4	2	7	18	28	−10	14	
6	Markham FC	13	3	2	8	15	29	−14	11	
7	Morobe Wawens	13	2	3	8	21	28	−7	9	
8	Tusbab Stallions	13	2	2	9	16	37	−21	8	

Source: PNG FA
(Q) Qualified for the phase indicated

==== Results ====
Home \ Away	BPU	LAH	LAI	MAR	MOU	MOW	TOC	TUS
Besta PNG United	—	0–2	1–2	2–1	3–2	2–0	2–3	4–1
Lahi FC	2–3	—	6–3		0–1	2–1	1–9	3–2
Laiwaden FC	2–3	0–0	—	2–0		3–2	1–2	0–1
Markham FC	3–3	0–0	0–1	—	2–4	2–1	0–5	4–1
Morobe United	1–0	6–0	6–0	2–1	—	1–0	0–0	6–1
Morobe Wawens	3–4	2–2	2–1	3–0	2–2	—	0–4	2–2
Toti City	0–1	3–1	4–2	4–0	3–1	3–2	—	6–0
Tusbab Stallions	2–3	2–0	1–1	1–2	1–4		1–2	—

Updated to match(es) played on 4 May 2019. Source: PNG FA
Legend: Blue = home team win; Yellow = draw; Red = away team win.

=== Southern Conference ===
Matches took place at the Sir John Guise Stadium, Port Moresby.

Pos	Team	Pld	W	D	L	GF	GA	GD	Pts	Qualification or relegation
1	Hekari United (Q)	14	14	0	0	45	12	+33	42	Qualification to Playoffs
2	Eastern Stars (Q)	14	8	0	6	34	22	+12	24	Qualification to Playoffs
3	Port Moresby United	14	7	3	4	28	24	+4	24	
4	FC Bougainville	14	7	1	6	19	13	+6	22	
5	Central United	14	5	3	6	23	35	−12	18	
6	PRK Gulf Komara	14	5	2	7	23	21	+2	17	
7	Star Mountain FC	14	1	4	9	20	39	−19	7	
8	Southern Strikers	14	1	3	10	17	43	−26	6	

Source: PNG FA
(Q) Qualified for the phase indicated

==== Results ====
Home \ Away	BOU	CEU	EAS	HEU	PGK	PMU	SOS	STM
FC Bougainville	—	1–2	0–1	0–1	0–1	1–2	3–0 (Note: Original score 1–1, match awarded 3–0 against Southern Strikers after they fielded an ineligible player)	2–0
Central United	0–2	—	2–6	1–3	2–1	1–6	1–0	2–2
Eastern Stars	1–2	1–2	—	2–3	0–2	1–2	4–1	4–1
Hekari United	1–0	2–0	4–1	—	3–1	1–0	6–2	7–2
PRK Gulf Komara	0–0	1–2	1–3	1–3	—	1–2	3–0	7–2
Port Moresby United	1–2	3–1	0–3	1–4	2–2	—	3–3	1–0
Southern Strikers	2–4	4–4	1–5	0–5	0–1	1–2	—	2–1
Star Mountain FC	1–2	3–3	1–2	1–2	2–1	3–3	1–1	—

Updated to match(es) played on 4 May 2019. Source: PNG FA
Legend: Blue = home team win; Yellow = draw; Red = away team win.

=== Highlands Conference ===
Matches took place at the National Sports Institute, Goroka.

Pos	Team	Pld	W	D	L	GF	GA	GD	Pts	Qualification or relegation
1	Kagua Erave FC (Q)	10	8	0	2	32	9	+23	24	Qualification to Playoffs
2	Blue Kumuls (Q)	10	5	1	4	28	20	+8	16	Qualification to Playoffs
3	Mt Hagen FC	10	5	1	4	17	18	−1	16	
4	Aporo Mai FC	10	5	0	5	18	12	+6	15	
5	Enga Laima FC	10	3	1	6	16	36	−20	10	
6	Simbu Angra FC	10	1	3	6	17	33	−16	6	

Source: PNG FA
(Q) Qualified for the phase indicated

==== Results ====
Home \ Away	APM	BLK	ENL	KAE	MTH	SIM
Aporo Mai FC	—	2–1	5–0	0–1	1–2	0–1
Blue Kumuls	4–2	—	4–3	0–2	2–0	1–1
Enga Laima FC	0–3 (Note: Match awarded 3–0 against Enga Laima after they failed to show for the match)	2–6	—	1–11	0–3	4–1
Kagua Erave FC	0–1	1–0	0–1	—	3–0	6–2
Mt Hagen FC	3–2	3–0	1–3	1–4	—	3–2
Simbu Angra FC	0–2	4–10	2–2	3–4	1–1	—

Updated to match(es) played on 27 April 2019. Source: PNG FA
Legend: Blue = home team win; Yellow = draw; Red = away team win.

=== Islands Conference ===
Matches took place at the Ceremonial Park, Kokopo and the Muthuvel Stadium, Kimbe.

Pos	Team	Pld	W	D	L	GF	GA	GD	Pts	Qualification or relegation
1	Chebu AROB FC (Q)	8	6	0	2	19	10	+9	18	Qualification to Playoffs
2	West Tribe FC (Q)	8	5	1	2	22	10	+12	16	Qualification to Playoffs
3	Radazz FC	8	4	2	2	17	17	0	14	
4	Greengold Liners	8	0	4	4	12	18	−6	4	
5	Gazelle FC	8	0	3	5	11	26	−15	3	

Source: PNG FA
(Q) Qualified for the phase indicated

==== Results ====
Home \ Away	CHA	GAZ	NGL	RAD	WET
Chebu AROB FC	—	3–0 (Note: Match awarded 3–0 against Gazelle FC after they failed to show for the match)	1–0	2–3	3–2
Gazelle FC	1–2	—	2–2	0–3	1–5
Greengold Liners	3–4	3–3	—	1–2	0–3
Radazz FC	0–4	2–2	3–3	—	1–3
West Tribe FC	1–0	6–2	0–0	2–3	—

Updated to match(es) played on 5 May 2019. Source: PNG FA
Legend: Blue = home team win; Yellow = draw; Red = away team win.

== Playoffs ==
Quarter-finals
Hekari United	2
West Tribe FC	0
Chebu AROB FC	0
Eastern Stars	2
Toti City FC	8
Blue Kumuls	1
Kagua-Erave FC	1
Morobe United	5

Semi-finals
Hekari United	2	2	4
Eastern Stars	0	1	1
Toti City FC	2	4	6
Morobe United	1	1	2

Grand final
Hekari United	0 (4)
Toti City FC	0 (5)
Third place match
Eastern Stars	2
Morobe United	3

=== Quarter-finals ===
11 May 2019

Hekari United	2–0	West Tribe
Tutizama Tanito; Kolu Kepo	Report

Sir John Guise Stadium, Port Moresby
16 May 2019

Chebu AROB	0–2	Eastern Stars
	Report	Andrew Lepani; Riggie Togubai

Sir John Guise Stadium, Port Moresby (Note: Match originally due to be played in Kokopo on 11 May, but due to weather, it was postponed and rearranged to be played in a neutral venue)
12 May 2019

Toti City FC	8–1	Blue Kumuls
Raymond Gunemba; Joshua Talau; Emmanuel Airem	Report	Nelson Sam

Sir Ignatius Kilage Stadium, Lae
11 May 2019

Kagua Erave	1–5	Morobe United

National Sports Institute, Goroka

=== Semi-finals ===
==== First legs ====
19 May 2019

Hekari United	2–0	Eastern Stars
Kolu Kepo; Koriak Upaiga	Report

Sir John Guise Stadium, Port Moresby
18 May 2019

Toti City FC	2–1	Morobe United
Emmanuel Airem; Mathew David	Report	Elliud Fugre

Sir Ignatius Kilage Stadium, Lae

==== Second legs ====
25 May 2019

Eastern Stars	1–2	Hekari United
Ian Paia	Report	Patrick Aisa; Tutizama Tanito

Sir John Guise Stadium, Port Moresby
25 May 2019

Morobe United	1–4	Toti City FC
Alex Kamen	Report	Nigel Dabinyaba; Michael Foster; Raymond Gunemba

Sir Ignatius Kilage Stadium, Lae

=== Third place match ===
1 June 2019

Eastern Stars	2–3	Morobe United
Sarto Modagai; John Ray	Report	May Epale; Alex Kamen; Russell Nirik

Sir John Guise Stadium, Port Moresby

=== Grand final ===
1 June 2019

Hekari United	0–0 (a.e.t.)	Toti City FC
	Report
Penalties
Tanito (penalty scored); Joe (penalty scored); Daudau (penalty missed); Thomas (penalty missed); Upaiga (penalty scored); Kepo (penalty scored); Sakael (penalty missed)	4–5	Foster (penalty scored); Dabinyaba Jr (penalty missed); Nelson (penalty scored); Dabinyaba (penalty scored); Gunemba (penalty missed); Milubwa (penalty scored); Simon (penalty scored)

Sir John Guise Stadium, Port Moresby

== Controversies ==
=== Death of Mikes Gewa ===
On 30 March, Laiwaden FC goalkeeper Mikes Gewa was kicked in the ribs by Morobe Wawens' Jason Farrock, and the player was hospitalised. The player died just under a month later in hospital. It was then revealed that the National Soccer League hadn't taken out medical insurance to cover its players, continuing that it would likely be the case for the following season, and that both the NSL and the clubs taking part had overlooked the issue and should share the blame.

=== Playoff draws ===
The format of the playoffs caused some controversy amongst players, coaches and fans alike, mainly because teams from the same regional division were not kept apart until the final, meaning it was impossible for two sides from the same conference to meet in the final and secure continental qualification. Furthermore, the format was changed twice within a month, leading Eastern Stars' chairman Joseph Ealedona to describe it as 'fraud at the highest level'. PNGFA chairman John Kapi Natto responded to the criticism by distancing the association, which only gives advice on how the competition should be run, from the management of the NSL itself, and stating that he believed the draws were done 'after taking into consideration the costs involved.'
