= F.C. Kutubu =

Kutubu
- Full name: Football Club Kutubu
- Founded: 2019; 7 years ago
- Chairman: Terence Tony Tipi
- Manager: Mathew Witu
- League: Papua New Guinea National Soccer League
- 2019–20: 10th

FC Kutubu was a semi-professional association football club based in the Hekari Province near Kutubu, Papua New Guinea. The club was founded in 2019, and was the parent club of Aporo Mai FC. The club took part in the 2019–20 Papua New Guinea National Soccer League, finishing last.

== History ==
The club was founded in 2019, and became the first club to join the new 2019–20 season of the Papua New Guinea National Soccer League. It was later revealed that the club is under the same management as Aporo Mai FC, which took part in the 2019 National Soccer League, and that FC Kutubu would act as the parent club for Aporo Mai.

The club played their first match at their "home" for the season, the National Sports Institute in Goroka. They defeated Morobe Wawens 1–0 thanks to a goal from Andrew Apo. However, despite a second win against Star Mountain in the fourth round of fixtures, with Apo hitting a hat-trick, the side found themselves second-from-bottom at the halfway stage of the season, having suffered heavy defeats to the likes of Tusbab Stallions (0–5) and Lae City (1–8).

The side started the second half of the season relatively strongly, picking up four points from their opening three matches, including a 4–3 victory over Gulf Komara, but could only finish bottom of the table with 11 points.

== Domestic record ==
=== National competitions ===
- Papua New Guinea National Soccer League
  - 2019–20: 10th
