= Simbu Angra F.C. =

Football club in Papua New Guinea

Simbu Angra
- Full name: Simbu Angra Football Club
- Founded: 2019
- Chairman: Wera Mori
- Manager: John Doro; Eric Sinebare
- League: Papua New Guinea National Soccer League
- 2019: Highlands Conference: 6th

Simbu Angra FC, sometimes spelled Chimbu Angra or Simbu Angras, was a semi-professional association football club based in Chimbu Province, Papua New Guinea. The club was founded in 2019.

The club took part in the 2019 edition of the Papua New Guinea National Soccer League, finishing bottom of the Highlands Conference.

== History ==
The team was announced to compete in the 2019 Papua New Guinea National Soccer League in January 2019, with the side consisting of players from Madang, Morobe and Chimbu provinces. Before the season kicked off, the only players with previous NSL experience were captain Murphy Yomi, vice-captain Cornelius Aris, Isaac Lalo and Dennis Gira.

The side started the season strongly, losing just one of their five games in the first half of the season – after three straight draws, they lost 6–2 to Kagua-Erave, before a Nalon Nalon penalty saw them edge past Aporo Mai 1–0. At the halfway stage, the team sat fourth in the conference table. The second half of the season was poor, though, with the side losing all five of their matches, including a 10–4 defeat against Blue Kumuls. The team therefore finished sixth out of six in the regional conference.

== Domestic record ==
=== National competitions ===
- Papua New Guinea National Soccer League
  - 2019: Highlands Conference: 6th

== Final squad ==
As of 6 March 2019

Note: Flags indicate national team as defined under FIFA eligibility rules; some limited exceptions apply. Players may hold more than one non-FIFA nationality.

No.	Pos.	Nation	Player
—		PNG	Simon Nasson
—		PNG	Sibauk Robert
—		PNG	Maiya Rioma
—		PNG	Galilo Elijah
—		PNG	Risom Ian
—		PNG	Vitus Joseph
—		PNG	Yamang Isidor
—		PNG	Malong Paul
—		PNG	Isaac Lalo
—		PNG	Duyapu Ben
—		PNG	Berigami Jacob
—		PNG	Cornelius Aris (vice-captain)
—		PNG	Nalon Nalon
—		PNG	Iha Johna

No.	Pos.	Nation	Player
—		PNG	Malong McNair
—		PNG	Allan Wayne
—		PNG	Kambual Brendan
—		PNG	Waren Milton
—		PNG	Murphy Yomi (captain)
—		PNG	Gendua Simon
—		PNG	Kassam Eliud
—		PNG	Labo Elwy
—		PNG	Pangari Josiah
—		PNG	Dennis Gira
—		PNG	Sabo Jackron
—		PNG	Iggy Sylvester
—		PNG	Mark Ben
