= Greengold Liners F.C. =

Association football club based in Papua New Guinea

Greengold Liners
- Full name: New Britain Palm Oil Limited Greengold Liners Football Club
- Founded: 2018
- Manager: Sam Abraham
- League: Papua New Guinea National Soccer League
- 2019: Islands Conference: 4th

Greengold Liners, known for sponsorship reasons as NBPOL Greengold Liners (New Britain Palm Oil Limited) and sometimes by their short name Greengold FC, was an association football club based in New Britain, Papua New Guinea.

Founded in 2018, the club competed in the Islands Conference of the 2019 Papua New Guinea National Soccer League, making their debut in the competition.

== History ==
The club was founded in 2018, shortly before the start of the 2019 Papua New Guinea National Soccer League. It was one of five clubs drawn into the Islands Conference of the competition, and played its first match on 24 February against West Tribe F.C., drawing 0–0. The side drew their next two fixtures, before suffering first defeat on 24 March, 4–3 against Chebu AROB F.C. to dent their chances of qualifying for the next stage. The second half of the season saw the side continue to fail to register a win, drawing 3–3 with Vudal Gazelle F.C. but losing their remaining three fixtures. The side eventually finished in 4th place, with four draws and four defeats.

== Domestic record ==
=== National competitions ===
- Papua New Guinea National Soccer League
  - 2019: Islands Conference: 4th
