= 2026 Papua New Guinea Premier Soccer League =

Papua New Guinea Premier Soccer League
- Season: 2026
- Dates: May 30th – October 18th
- Champions: Komara Gulf

The 2026 Papua New Guinea Premier Soccer League was the 20th edition of top-tier soccer in Papua New Guinea overall. The league began on May 30th with 12 teams.

Komara Gulf are the defending champions.

== Teams ==
Papua New Guinea Premier Soccer League 2026
Team	Region	Previous best	Other honours	Stadium	Capacity
Admiralty Islands	Northern		None	Various	
Komara Gulf	Southern	2015–16: Southern Conference: 4th 2019–20: 4th	2018 National Premier League: Champions	Various	
PNG Hekari (previously Hekari United FC)	Southern	2006–14, 2022–23: Champions (10x)	2009–10 OFC Champions League: Champions 2017 National Premier League: Champions; 2007 Port Moresby Premier League: Champions	PNG Football Stadium	14,800
Lae City	Northern	2015–19: Champions (5x)	2018, 2019 OFC Champions League: Quarter-finalists	Sir Ignatius Kilage Stadium	1,500
Lae City Dwellers	Northern	2022–23: Runners-up	None	Sir Ignatius Kilage Stadium	1,500
Morobe Wawens	Northern	2018: 3rd	None	PNGFA Academy	
Port Moresby Strikers	Southern	2018: 5th	None	Various	
NDC	Southern		None	PNG Football Stadium	14,800
Madang United	Northern		None	Laiwaden Oval	1,000
WAWA	Northern		None	Various	
Kula	Southern		None	Various	
Finschhafen Bavarians	Northern				
