= Mount Hagen F.C. =

Association football club in Mount Hagen, PNG

Mount Hagen
- Full name: Mount Hagen Football Club
- Founded: 2018
- Manager: Ayioka Ungia
- League: Papua New Guinea National Soccer League
- 2019: Highlands Conference: 3rd

Mount Hagen FC, sometimes abbreviated to Mt Hagen FC, was a semi-professional association football club based in Mount Hagen, Western Highlands, Papua New Guinea. The club was founded in late 2018.

The club's competitive debut was in the 2019 edition of the Papua New Guinea National Soccer League, where they were drawn into the Highlands Conference.

== History ==
Reports of a club under the name of Mount Hagen FC hailing from the Western Highlands first appeared in late 2018, with the club confirmed as taking part in the 2019 Papua New Guinea National Soccer League in early January 2019.

The club endured a slow start to the season, losing 3–0 to Kagua-Erave on the opening day, and being held to a 1–1 draw against Simbu Angra on 16 February. However, the club then proceeded to win three straight matches to go into the halfway stage in second place in the conference. In a key clash against rivals Blue Kumuls, the club went down 2–0, conceding their three-point lead over Kumuls, and this defeat would eventually lead to their failure to qualify for the next stage, as the side finished level on points with Blue Kumuls with an inferior goal difference.

== Domestic record ==
=== National competitions ===
- Papua New Guinea National Soccer League
  - 2019: Highlands Conference: 3rd
