= West Tribe F.C. =

Association football club in West New Britain, PNG

West Tribe
- Full name: West Tribe Football Club
- Founded: 2018
- Manager: Hans Fred
- League: Papua New Guinea National Soccer League
- 2019: Islands Conference: 2nd Quarter-finals

West Tribe FC, sometimes known as West Tribes, was a semi-professional association football club based in Kimbe, West New Britain, Papua New Guinea. The club was founded in 2018.

The club took part in the 2019 edition of the Papua New Guinea National Soccer League. They finished second in the Islands Conference and qualified for the next stage, eventually reaching the quarter-finals.

== History ==
Reports of a club having entered the 2019 Papua New Guinea National Soccer League from the Kimbe region, under the name of West Tribe, first appeared in late 2018. The club were drawn into the Islands Conference. Before the season started, the club played a trial match against conference rivals Greengold Liners, winning 2–1. The two sides played again on the opening day, but neither side was able to find a goal in a nil-nil draw. However, the side went on to win three matches on the bounce to go top of the league at the halfway stage.

Consecutive 3–2 defeats to playoff rivals Chebu AROB FC and Radazz FC put their qualification for the next stage in doubt, but the side required only a win on the final day against bottom-of-the-table Vudal Gazelle FC. They were able to win the game 5–1, qualifying in second place behind Chebu AROB F.C. The club was drawn away against then eight-time champions Hekari United in the quarter-finals, and despite a standout performance from Tribe's goalkeeper Alken Karapa, Tribe went down 2–0 in their final match of the season.

== Domestic record ==
=== National competitions ===
- Papua New Guinea National Soccer League
  - 2019: Quarter-finals
