= Papua New Guinea FA Cup =

Besta Cup
- Organiser(s): Papua New Guinea Football Association
- Founded: 1988
- Region: OFC
- Current champions: Morobe FC (2019)
- Most championships: Madang FC; Lae City FC (3 titles each)

The Papua New Guinea FA Cup, also known for sponsorship reasons as Besta Cup, is the top association football knockout cup tournament of Papua New Guinea, organized by the Papua New Guinea Football Association since 1988.

== Winners ==
Season	Winner	Result	Runner-up
PNGFA Cup
1988	Lae City FC	2-0	Adama
1990	Madang FC		
1991	Port Moresby		
2003	Madang FC	3-1	Lae City FC
2006	Finschhafen	1-1*	Port Moresby
Besta Cup
2011	Lae City FC	3-1	Public Servants SA
2012	Lae City FC	7-0	Boungaville FC
2014	Manus	3-2	Lae City FC
2015	Manus	1-0	Madang FC
2017	Madang FC	0-0 (5-4p)	PMSA
2018	Morobe	3-0	Almani
2019	Morobe	1-1**	NCD PSSA

*Finschhafen won the 2006 Cup

**Morobe won the 2019 Cup on penalties

== See also ==
- Papua New Guinea Premier Soccer League
