= Joshua Talau =

Papua New Guinean football player (born 1996)

Personal information
- Full name: Joshua Talau
- Date of birth: 19 April 1996 (age 30)
- Place of birth: Port Moresby, Papua New Guinea
- Position: Defender

Team information
- Current team: Lae City Dwellers

Youth career
- Besta United PNG

Senior career*
Years	Team	Apps	(Gls)
2012–2015	Besta United PNG		
2015–	Lae City FC		

International career^{‡}
2013	Papua New Guinea U17	4	(0)
2014–	Papua New Guinea U20	2	(0)
2015–	Papua New Guinea U23	0	(0)
2014–	Papua New Guinea	3	(0)
Medal record
Men's football
Representing Papua New Guinea
Pacific Games
Bronze medal – third place	2015 Papua New Guinea
- * Club domestic league appearances and goals as of 26 March 2015 ‡ National team caps and goals as of 20 July 2019

Joshua Talau (born 19 April 1996) is a Papua New Guinean footballer who plays as a defender for Lae City FC in the NSL and the Papua New Guinea national football team. He made his debut for the national team in September 2014, age 18, against Singapore

== Club ==
Talau played his club football for Besta United PNG in the Papua New Guinea National Soccer League. Besta United PNG is the national development team of the Papua New Guinea Football Association. In 2015, he moved to Lae City Dwellers with which he won the NSL. He also played during the 2016 OFC Champions League

== International ==
In September 2014, Talau made his debut for Papua New Guinea, coming on as a substitute in a 2–1 loss to Singapore.

== Honours ==
Papua New Guinea U-23

- Pacific Games: Bronze Medalis, 2015
