= Aporo Mai F.C. =

Association football club in Kutubu, PNG

Aporo Mai
- Full name: Aporo Mai Football Club
- Founded: 2019; 7 years ago
- Chairman: Terence Tipi
- Manager: Mathew Witu
- League: Papua New Guinea National Soccer League
- 2019: Highlands Conference: 4th

Aporo Mai FC, sometimes spelt Aporro Mai FC, was a semi-professional association football club based in Hekari Province near Kutubu, Papua New Guinea. The club was founded in 2019, as the feeder club for FC Kutubu.

The club took part in the 2019 Papua New Guinea National Soccer League, where they were drawn into the Highlands Conference. They finished fourth out of six teams.

== History ==
Coached by former Hekari United coach Mathew Witu, the club was revealed to be taking part in the 2019 edition of the Papua New Guinea National Soccer League in late January 2019 under the sponsorship of Kutubu Security Service Ltd. Before the season began, the club only had one player with NSL experience – former PNG international Samuel Kini. However, on the opening day of the season, the side thrashed Enga Laima 5–0 to go top of the league immediately.

This opening day victory was their only win in the first half of the season, with the side losing their next four matches by two- or one-goal margins, leaving them fifth out of six sides at the halfway stage. On 30 March, the side picked up a 1–0 victory against league leaders Kagua Erave FC, becoming the first team to take any points off Kagua Erave that season. However, this was not enough to revive their campaign fully, and the side finished fourth in the conference with 15 points.

== Domestic record ==
=== National competitions ===
- Papua New Guinea National Soccer League
  - 2019: Highlands Conference: 4th

== Final squad ==
As of 27 February 2019

Note: Flags indicate national team as defined under FIFA eligibility rules; some limited exceptions apply. Players may hold more than one non-FIFA nationality.

No.	Pos.	Nation	Player
—		PNG	Jonathan Pole
—		PNG	Gilbert Irapo
—		PNG	Steven Tom
—		PNG	Exit Kola
—		PNG	Roger Kapang
—		PNG	Jes Moses
—		PNG	Clement Mita
—	MF	PNG	Samuel Kini (captain)
—		PNG	Scott William
—		PNG	Harry Tulf
—		PNG	Kapi Losti

No.	Pos.	Nation	Player
—	FW	PNG	Karesa Morris
—		PNG	Noah Komia
—		PNG	Lawrence David
—		PNG	Imex Anton
—		PNG	Dickson Suraro
—		PNG	Siamo Madi
—		PNG	Andrew Wilson
—		PNG	Fredrick Daniel
—		PNG	Kape Kenny
—		PNG	Henry Thomas
—		PNG	Rex Otto

== See also ==
- Blue Kumuls (Mount Hagen)
