= Besta PNG United =

U23 football club in Papua New Guinea

Besta PNG Utd
- Full name: Besta PNG United
- Ground: Lloyd Robson Oval; Port Moresby, Papua New Guinea
- Capacity: 12,000
- Manager: Harrison Kamake
- League: Papua New Guinea National Soccer League
- 2019: Northern Conference: 3rd
Home colours	Away colours

Besta PNG United, sometimes known as Besta United PNG, was a men's soccer club based in Papua New Guinea. The side acted as the national development team of the Papua New Guinea Football Association, and was limited to players who are under the age of 23.

The side made their debut in the Papua New Guinea National Soccer League in the 2009–10 season, finishing bottom of the table. Since then, they have made gradual progress, with their best success coming in 2018, when they reached the Grand Final for the first time, losing 3–0 to Toti City Dwellers.

== History ==
The side first entered the National Soccer League ahead of the 2009–10 season, with the players consisting of players who had been selected at an U20 competition in Lae earlier in 2009. The side were managed by former Welgris coach Matthew Witu. In November, tragedy struck the side as their starting goalkeeper, Fenney Bonki, lost his life after being hit in a vehicle accident. The side picked up just one win, against Rapatona, and four draws, finishing bottom of the table. However, midfielder Emmanuel Simon picked up the Player of the Season award.

In September 2010, it was confirmed that the side would return to the National Soccer League for the 2010–11 season. For a while it looked as if the team would continue to struggle, having been unable to pick up a win in any of their first six games, but the side finally picked up their first win of the season on 22 January 2011 with a 5–2 victory over Madang Fox. They followed this up with a win against Tukoko University before a 1–1 draw with champions Hekari United. Eventually, they squeezed into the playoffs after finishing in fourth place, just one point ahead of Petro Souths. However, a 5–1 defeat to Hekari in the semi-finals pushed them into the third-place match against Tukoko University, which was never played. The side therefore were awarded fourth place overall by virtue of their lower league position. Emmanuel Simon again won the division's Player of the Season award, while striker Jamal Seeto, aged 18, won the Golden Boot.

The 2011–12 season was a little turbulent, with weather affecting the ability for some matches to be played, but Besta continued their gradual improvement, picking up seven wins and finishing third in the regular season table. They faced second-placed Eastern Stars in the semi-final, but went down to a narrow 1–0 defeat. In the third-place playoff, they took on Tukoko University, where, after the score was level at 2–2 after regular time, the side went on to secure third place with a 3–2 victory in the penalty shoot-out. Emmanuel Simon picked up the Player of the Season award for the third consecutive season.

By the end of 2012, Besta PNG were one of only four teams to have completed the necessary paperwork ahead of the upcoming season, which as a result ended up being delayed until 2013. In the end, Besta were one of eight teams and once again improved their stance, finishing second in the regular season table and again qualifying for the playoffs. However, they were unable to translate this form to the playoffs, where they once again fell in the semi-finals, losing 2–0 to new franchise FC Port Moresby despite early pressure on the visitors' goal. They were, however, able to secure third place for the second successive season with a 3–2 victory over Gigira Laitepo Morobe, thanks to a Cooper Ipako hat-trick.

For the next three seasons, the side suffered a dip in form, failing to qualify for the playoffs on each occasion. In 2014, they finished sixth out of seven teams, winning three games and losing eight. In 2015, they managed just two victories and finished bottom of the league, despite a shock 2–1 victory over reigning champions Hekari United. In the 2015–16 season, they were one of six teams in the league's Northern Conference, where they finished 5th.

In the two years after several clubs broke away from the league as part of the Football Federation Papua New Guinea, Besta PNG's fortunes improved dramatically. In the 2017 season, the club finished fourth in the regular season table, qualifying for the playoffs. In the semi-final, they faced regular season champions Lae City Dwellers, and went down 2–1 after extra time. However, their third-placed match against PS United was never scheduled after their opponents withdrew before even playing their semi-final. This meant they were awarded third place by default. The following season, they went one better, finishing third in the regular season table before securing a tight 1–0 victory over Morobe Wawens in the semi-finals to reach the Grand Final for the first time in their history. However, they went down 3–0 in the final against Toti City Dwellers.

Following the reunification of football in the nation ahead of the 2019 season, the club was drawn into the Northern Conference alongside reigning champions Toti City. The side started the season sluggishly, losing three of their opening five games to Lahi United, Morobe United and Laiwaden FC. A 3–3 draw with Markham FC was followed by a narrow defeat to Toti City 2–3, with the side having led 2–0. However, the second half of the season was a huge success, with the side overturning all seven of their opponents, but narrowly missing out on qualification thanks to the consistent form of eventual qualifiers Toti and Morobe. The side eventually finished third in the conference.

== Honours ==
- Papua New Guinea National Soccer League
  - Runners-up (1): 2018
  - Third place (3): 2011–12, 2013, 2017
