= Laiwaden F.C. =

Association football club in Madang, PNG

Laiwaden
- Full name: Laiwaden Football Club Madang
- Founded: 2017
- League: National Soccer League
- 2019: Northern Conference: 5th

Laiwaden FC was a semi-professional association football club based in Madang, Papua New Guinea. The club was founded in 2017.

The side made their competitive debut in the 2017 Papua New Guinea National Premier League, where they finished 4th in the Northern Conference.

== History ==
The club was founded in 2017, shortly before the inaugural season of the Papua New Guinea National Premier League. The side was drawn into the Northern Conference, alongside the likes of Morobe and Markham, and opened their season with a 1–1 draw against Lahi United. Their first ever competitive win came in the third gameweek, with the side winning 1–0 against Bulolo United, which sparked a run of three consecutive victories. The side struggled in the second half the season, however, winning just one game and eventually finishing fourth.

The side was one of four teams in the Northern Conference of the 2018 National Premier League season, which was stylised as a 'Champions League' and took place on three consecutive days in 2018. The side finished bottom of their pool, drawing only one game, with eventual finalists Morobe FC.

The club was one of eight teams drawn into the Northern Conference of the 2019 Papua New Guinea National Soccer League. The side won their first game on 16 February 2019 with a 2–0 win over former National Premier League rivals Markham FC, and went unbeaten for four weeks, including victories against Morobe Wawens and Besta PNG United, until a 4–2 defeat to reigning champions Toti City on 16 March.

On 30 March 2019, the club's goalkeeper Mikes Gewa was kicked in the ribs by Morobe Wawens' Jason Farrock, and the player was hospitalised. The player died just under a month later in hospital. Thereafter, the season went downhill, with the club winning just one of their remaining five matches, eventually finishing 5th in the conference.

== Domestic record ==
=== National competitions ===
- Papua New Guinea National Soccer League
  - 2019: Northern Conference: 5th
- Papua New Guinea National Premier League
  - 2018: Northern Conference: 4th
  - 2017: Northern Conference: 4th
