= Chebu AROB F.C. =

Association football club in Papua New Guinea

Chebu AROB
- Full name: Chebu Autonomous Region of Bougainville Football Club
- Founded: 2019
- Manager: Peter Kauma; David Matanu
- League: Papua New Guinea National Soccer League
- 2019: Islands Conference: 1st Quarter-finals

Chebu AROB FC was an association football club based in the autonomous region of Bougainville in Papua New Guinea. The club was founded in 2019.

The club took part in the 2019 edition of the Papua New Guinea National Soccer League, and qualified for the playoffs following their top two placing in the Islands Conference.

== History ==
The club was founded in 2019 shortly before the start of the 2019 Papua New Guinea National Soccer League. Overseen by the Bougainville Football Federation, the club consists of players predominantly from the island of Bougainville, with some having experience at the PNG Games and the domestic Besta Cup, but none with experience at the top level of Papua New Guinean football. The club were drawn into the Islands Conference alongside four other teams.

The club started the season strongly, picking up an opening day 4–0 victory against Radazz, before a narrow 1–0 defeat to West Tribe FC would be their only defeat in the first half of the season. Going into the second half of the season in second place, they were defeated 3–2 by Radazz before a vital 3–2 victory over league leaders West Tribe. On 27 April 2019, the club qualified for the playoffs of the competition with a 2–1 victory over Vudal Gazelle.

The club were drawn against Eastern Stars, runners-up from the Southern Conference, in the playoff quarter-finals. The tie was originally intended to be played in Kokopo on 11 May 2019, but after 48 minutes the game was abandoned due to a waterlogged pitch, with the score at 0–0. The game was eventually moved to Port Moresby on 16 May, where Stars won 2–0 to end AROB's season.

== Domestic record ==
=== National competitions ===
- Papua New Guinea National Soccer League
  - 2019: Quarter-finals

== Final squad ==
As of 28 February 2019

Note: Flags indicate national team as defined under FIFA eligibility rules; some limited exceptions apply. Players may hold more than one non-FIFA nationality.

No.	Pos.	Nation	Player
—		PNG	Nahi Towari
—		PNG	Tony Wagum
—		PNG	Linus Dising
—		PNG	Richard Mongi
—		PNG	Micky Eric
—		PNG	Raymond Siha
—		PNG	Ferdinand Kusi
—		PNG	Isaac Karoun
—		PNG	David Imarato

No.	Pos.	Nation	Player
—		PNG	Jeffrey Brian
—		PNG	Isaac Karai
—		PNG	Apako Siupe
—		PNG	Tony Bainton
—		PNG	Cletus Noneng
—		PNG	Johnny Manuai
—		PNG	Richard Koipika
—		PNG	Raymond Maimoi (captain)
