= Blue Kumuls (Mount Hagen) =

Association football club in Mount Hagen, PNG

- Full name: Blue Kumuls Soccer Club
- League: Papua New Guinea National Soccer League
- 2019: Highlands Conference: 2nd Quarter-finals

Blue Kumuls was a semi-professional association football club based in Mount Hagen, Papua New Guinea. The club was founded sometime before 1980's.

The club has taken part in three editions of the Papua New Guinea National Club Championship, with best finish coming in 2005 when they finished fourth. They also finished as runners-up in the Highlands Regional League on two occasions. Under the leadership of Elias Wapsiat, they took part in the 2019 edition of the Papua New Guinea National Soccer League, reaching the playoffs after having finished second in the Highlands Conference. In 2021, Blue Kumuls Football Club merged with Aporo Mai F.C. to form Ape Aporo and finished first in the Highlands Conference.

== History ==
The first records of the club playing competitively was in the 1997 Papua New Guinea National Club Championship. However, the side failed to make an impact on the competition. The club also took part in the 1998 edition, but also failed to make the knockout stages.

In 1999, the club took part in the Highlands Regional League and topped their pool. However, in 2001 the side returned, and was beaten in the final by Momads. This fate was repeated four years later when the side fell 3–1 against Momads in the Grand Final. The two sides were due to play in the following season's final on 21 May 2006, but the match was abandoned at half-time. Later that year, the club took part in the Papua New Guinea National Club Championship for the second time. They placed bottom of their pool behind Sobou FC, University and West United.

The side reached the 2008 Highlands Regional League final for the fourth time, where they were set to play Momads again. However, the match was not played due to an appeal over the eligibility of some of the Momads team – now operating under the name of Welgris Highlanders – having played in the Papua New Guinea National Soccer League earlier in the season.

The side's competitive record is unclear until late 2018, when it was confirmed they would be competing in the 2019 Papua New Guinea National Soccer League in the Highlands Conference. The side had a slow start to the competition, drawing 1–1 with Simbu Angra on the opening day, before a 4–2 win over Aporo Mai was followed by a 3–0 defeat at the hands of Mount Hagen FC. A win against Enga Laima was followed by a defeat to unbeaten leaders Kagua Erave, leaving the side third on seven points at the halfway stage, three behind Mount Hagen in second. A 2–0 reverse victory against Mount Hagen on 23 March was enough to draw them level with their local rivals, and two wins from their next four – including an incredible 10–4 victory against Simbu Angra which helped them overturn their goal difference deficit – was enough to qualify them for the next round in second place. The side were drawn against four-time champions Toti City in the playoff quarter-finals, and went down 8–1.

== Domestic record ==
=== National competitions ===
- Papua New Guinea National Soccer League
  - Quarter-finalists: 2019
- Papua New Guinea National Club Championship
  - Fourth: 2005

=== Regional competitions ===
- Highlands Regional League
  - Runners-up: 2001, 2005
- Highlands Regional Club Championship 2018:
  - Winners
