= Bulolo United F.C. =

Semi-professional Papua New Guinea football team

Bulolo United
- Full name: Bulolo United Football Club
- League: Papua New Guinea National Premier League
- 2017: Northern Conference: 6th

Bulolo United, known briefly as MMJV Bulolo United for sponsorship reasons, was a semi-professional Papua New Guinea association football team based in Lae, in the Morobe Province. The club was founded sometime before 1987.

It is best known for its participation in the Papua New Guinea National Soccer League during the 2011–12 season, their one and to date only appearance in the competition. The side finished in 6th place.

== History ==
The club's history dates back as far as 1987, when they took part in the Papua New Guinea National Club Championship. They were drawn in Group A alongside 5 other teams, but despite a 12–0 victory over Bengeta – the biggest victory of the competition – the side finished fourth and failed to qualify for the semi-finals.

Records pick up again in 1998, when the team reached the final of the Lae Regional Championship. The side lost 3–2 to local rivals Mopi in the final. More recently, the side took part in the regional Bulolo Premier Division, winning the title in 2006 and 2007. On 16 August 2011, it was announced that Bulolo was one of two new teams registered ahead of the 2011–12 Papua New Guinea National Soccer League. The side would be sponsored by the Morobe Mining Joint Venture (MMJV) and consist of players residing in the Bulolo district, as well as a few with previous NSL experience.

In their opening game, the side produced one of the biggest upsets with a 3–1 victory over Tukoko University. The following week, however, they were brought back down to earth after a 3–0 defeat to reigning champions Hekari United. By the end of the season, the side had lost 11 games out of 18, with two draws and five victories, including a 5–1 hammering of the bottom club Petro Souths. They finished in sixth place. Ahead of the delayed 2013 season, it was reported that Bulolo had expressed interest in returning to the competition. In the end, the club was not taking part.

The club returned to national action in 2017 as part of the breakaway National Premier League. The club was drawn in the Northern Conference, but made little impact on the competition, winning just one game against Lahi United, and losing the remaining nine.

== Domestic record ==
=== National competitions ===
- Papua New Guinea National Club Championship
  - 1987: Group stage
- Papua New Guinea National Soccer League
  - 2011–12: 6th
- Papua New Guinea National Premier League
  - 2017: Northern Conference: 6th

=== Regional competitions ===
- Lae Regional Championship
  - 1998: Runners-Up
- Bulolo Premier Division
  - 2006: Champions
  - 2007: Champions
