= Vitiaz United F.C. =

Association football club in Port Moresby

Vitiaz United
- Full name: Vitiaz United Football Club
- Founded: 2013; 12 years ago
- Ground: Laiwaden Oval
- Capacity: 1,000
- Manager: Rogena Strach
- League: National Soccer League
- 2019–20: 2nd

Vitiaz United FC was a semi-professional soccer club based in Port Moresby, Papua New Guinea, apparently founded sometime in 2013.

The club last competed in the 2019–20 Papua New Guinea National Soccer League, following a successful regional campaign which saw them win the Division One of the Port Moresby Soccer Association in late 2019.

== History ==
According to the club's Facebook page, the side was founded sometime in 2013. However, competitive records of the club begin in 2017, when the club was in Division One of the Port Moresby Soccer Association – the second level of football in the country's capital. The side finished 6th in Division One that year, before being demoted to Division Two for unknown reasons. In 2018, however, they secured promotion back to Division One, finishing second behind Gurupweu.

An excellent 2019 season saw the club win Division One and earn promotion to the PMSA Premier Division for the 2020 season. The club won 14 games and lost just three en route to the title, conceding nine goals.

In November 2019, it was confirmed that the side were one of 12 clubs in contention for a spot in the upcoming 2019–20 Papua New Guinea National Soccer League. On 11 December 2019, it was confirmed that the side would be one of two debutants in the new season.

The side began the season strongly, providing a tough challenge to perennial contenders Lae City and Hekari United, beating the former 2–1 on 25 January and playing out a goalless draw with latter on 29 February, becoming genuine contenders for the title themselves after losing just one game in the first half of the season. The side continued to challenge for the Minor Premiership until a couple of late-season defeats, to FC Bougainville (the only side to beat them home and away all season) and Gulf Komara, saw them slip out of contention for both the regular season title and OFC Champions League qualification. The last game of the season saw them draw 0–0 against Lae City which was enough to see them finish third and qualify for the playoffs. In the semi-final, the side secured a shock victory over eight-time champions Hekari United after extra time and penalties, before narrowly losing 1–0 to Lae City in the Grand Final.

Ahead of the 2021 season, the club declared that they were declining to take part in the competition, citing financial difficulties.

== Final squad ==
Squad for the 2019–20 PNG National Soccer League

Note: Flags indicate national team as defined under FIFA eligibility rules; some limited exceptions apply. Players may hold more than one non-FIFA nationality.

No.	Pos.	Nation	Player
1	GK	(Papua New Guinea) PNG	Russell Chris
4	DF	(Papua New Guinea) PNG	Joshua Talau
5	DF	(Papua New Guinea) PNG	Rodney Talau
6	DF	(Papua New Guinea) PNG	Junior Sigit
7	FW	(Papua New Guinea) PNG	Eliud Fugre
8	MF	(Papua New Guinea) PNG	Max Efale
9	FW	(Papua New Guinea) PNG	Joel Tiampo
10	MF	(Papua New Guinea) PNG	Eliot Foni
11	MF	(Papua New Guinea) PNG	Yagi Yasasa
14	MF	(Papua New Guinea) PNG	Donovan Murray
15	DF	(Papua New Guinea) PNG	Scott Henry
16	FW	(Papua New Guinea) PNG	Jonathan Allen
18	MF	(Papua New Guinea) PNG	Matthew David
19	DF	(Papua New Guinea) PNG	Peter Dabinyaba Jr.
20	DF	(Papua New Guinea) PNG	Mathias Oyabua
21	MF	(Papua New Guinea) PNG	Randal Passam
22	GK	(Papua New Guinea) PNG	Andrew Baniau

== Honours ==
=== National Competitions ===
- Papua New Guinea National Soccer League
  - Runners-Up: 2019–20

=== Regional Competitions ===
- Port Moresby Soccer Association Division One
  - Champions: 2019
