= David Aua =

Papua New Guinean footballer

Personal information
- Full name: David Aua
- Date of birth: February 11, 1983 (age 43)

Team information
- Current team: Gulf Komara (head coach)

Senior career*
Years	Team	Apps	(Gls)
2002–2004	PS United Port Moresby		
2005–2007	Sobou Lahi		
2007–2010	Gelle Hills United		
2010–2011	Hekari United		
2011	Gigira Laitepo Morobe Lae		

International career
2002–2010	Papua New Guinea	6	(0)
- * Club domestic league appearances and goals

David Aua is a Papua New Guinean former international footballer and current head coach who played as a goalkeeper.
