= Jerry Allen (footballer) =

Solomon Islands footballer (born 1979)

Personal information
- Date of birth: 21 March 1979 (age 47)
- Place of birth: Solomon Islands
- Position: Midfielder

Senior career*
Years	Team	Apps	(Gls)
–2003	Marist		
2004–2005	Systek Kingz		
2006–2008	Marist		

International career
2001–2003	Solomon Islands	4	(0)

Managerial career
- 2008–2010: Hekari
- 2010–2011: Hekari (assistant)
- 2011–2016: Hekari
- 2016–2018: Solomon Islands U17
- 2017: Marist (assistant)
- 2017–2018: Marist
- 2019–2020: Hekari
- 2020–2024: Honiara City FC
- 2021–2024: Solomon Islands U20
- 2026: PNG Hekari
- * Club domestic league appearances and goals

Jerry Allen (born 21 March 1979) is a Solomon Islands football manager and former footballer.

== Life and career ==
Allen is the older brother of Solomon Islands international Jerry Sam. He mainly operated as a midfielder. He started his career with Solomon Islands side Marist. In 2004, he signed for Systek Kingz. In 2006, he returned to Marist. He played for the Solomon Islands national football team at the 2002 OFC Nations Cup, the 2003 South Pacific Games and the 2002 FIFA World Cup qualification.

In 2008, Allen was appointed manager of Papua New Guinean side Hekari. He helped the club win the league and the 2009–10 OFC Champions League. They became the first non-New Zealand side to win the competition. He also managed them in the 2010 FIFA Club World Cup. In 2016, he was appointed manager of the Solomon Islands national under-17 football team. In 2017, he returned to Marist as an assistant manager. After that, he managed them in the OFC Champions League. In 2019, he returned to Hekari as manager for the third time, achieving third place in the league. In 2020, he was appointed manager of Solomon Islands side Honiara City, and 2021 took over the Solomon Islands national under-20 football team.
