= Lahi United F.C. =

Association football club in Lae

Lahi United
- Full name: Snax Lahi United Football Club
- Founded: 2017
- Chairman: Giob Gariki
- Manager: Emuka Tinge
- League: National Soccer League
- 2019: Northern Conference: 4th

Lahi United FC, known for sponsorship reasons as Snax Lahi United FC, was a semi-professional association football club based in Lae, Papua New Guinea. The club was founded in 2017.

The side made their competitive debut in the inaugural edition of the Papua New Guinea National Premier League, finishing 5th in the Northern Conference. They took part in the 2019 edition of the Papua New Guinea National Soccer League, finishing 4th in the Northern Conference.

== History ==
The club was founded in 2017, before the first edition of the Papua New Guinea National Premier League. The side were drawn into the Northern Conference alongside the likes of Markham FC, Morobe FC and Laiwaden FC, but had a poor season despite high expectations. They picked up three victories, against Morobe, Laiwaden and Bulolo United, but could only finish fifth out of six teams, failing to qualify for the next stage.

In late 2018, it was revealed that the side, under the new name of Snax Lahi FC, had expressed their interest in competing in the 2019 National Soccer League. Their official application was later accepted, and they were drawn into the Northern Conference.

The side made a decent start to their campaign, drawing 0–0 with former NPL rivals Markham FC on the opening day, before a 2–0 victory over Besta PNG United on 2 February. However, their form trailed off as they lost three of their next four games. In March 2019, chairman of the club Giob Gariki died. Their match against Markham FC was postponed. The club eventually finished 4th out of eight in the Northern Conference, with four wins, three draws and six defeats, way off the points required to qualify for the playoffs.

== Domestic record ==
=== National Competitions ===
- Papua New Guinea National Soccer League
  - 2019: Northern Conference: 4th
- Papua New Guinea National Premier League
  - 2017: Northern Conference: 5th
