= Kagua-Erave F.C. =

Association football club from Kagua-Erave region of PNG

Kagua-Erave
- Full name: Kagua-Erave Football Club
- Founded: 2018
- Chairman: Albert Veratau
- Manager: Steven Mune
- League: Papua New Guinea National Soccer League
- 2019: Highlands Conference: 1st Quarter-finals

Kagua-Erave FC, sometimes stylised as Kagua Erave FC, is a semi-professional association football club based in the Kagua-Erave District in the Southern Highlands of Papua New Guinea. The club was founded in 2018.

The club competed in the 2019 edition of the Papua New Guinea National Soccer League, having been drawn into the Highlands Conference. The club topped the conference and reached the quarter-finals.

== History ==
On 30 December 2018, it was revealed that a side under the name of Kagua Erave from the Southern Highlands had submitted an official application and paid their fee towards participation in the 2019 Papua New Guinea National Soccer League. Players were recruited predominantly from the Kagua-Erave District, following trials in the first weekend of January, and the club was managed by former PNG international Steven Mune. On 15 January 2019, it was reported that the club had received financial support of K60,000 from two backers ahead of the new season.

The club enjoyed a strong start to the season, winning their opening match against Blue Kumuls 3–1, followed by an 11–1 victory over Enga Laima in their second match in which Neil Hans scored four and Jordan Kaven scored three. The side went on to win all of their five matches in the first half of the season. Their first defeat came on 30 March when they lost 1–0 to Aporo Mai, and this was followed on 13 April by a defeat by the same scoreline against Enga Laima. Having qualified for the next stage of the competition, the side finished top of the conference.

In early May, the club's participation in the playoffs was thrown into doubt, after it was reported that players hadn't been paid. However, the club did eventually take to the field against Northern Conference runners-up Morobe United on 11 May in Goroka, going down 5–0.

== Domestic record ==
=== National competitions ===
- Papua New Guinea National Soccer League
  - 2019: Quarter-finals
