= Star Mountain F.C. =

Association football club from Papua New Guinea

Star Mountain
- Full name: Star Mountain Football Club
- Chairman: Maino Lucas
- Manager: Joseph Ame
- League: Papua New Guinea National Soccer League
Home colours	Away colours

Star Mountain FC was a professional football club based in Tabubil, in the Star Mountains area of the North Fly District of Papua New Guinea. The club was founded in the late 90's.

With the 1999 North Fly District championship their only title to date, the club entered the 2019 edition of the Papua New Guinea National Soccer League, where they were drawn into the Southern Conference.

== History ==
The first record of the side competing in regional competitions was in the 1999 North Fly District Grand Final, in which the side defeated Tabubil Town to claim the title.

No further records of the club exist until late 2018, when the club was confirmed as being one of eight sides drawn into the Southern Conference of the 2019 Papua New Guinea National Soccer League.

In their opening match on 27 January 2019, the side went down 1–0 to Southern Strikers, and would go on to lose their opening four matches by narrow, one-goal margins, until a 2–2 draw against Central United saw them pick up their first points of the season. The side went 2–0 up early and took this lead into the break, but the side were pegged back to 2–2 and narrowly avoided defeat after a late penalty for Central was saved. Following a 2–1 defeat to eight-time champions Hekari United and a 7–2 loss against Gulf Komara, the side went into the halfway stage with just one point from seven matches.

Following a draw with Southern Strikers and another high-scoring draw against Central United, the side finally won their first game of the season on 13 April 2019, winning 2–1 against Gulf Komara, a result which lifted them off the foot of the conference table. They remained there for the remainder of the season, eventually finishing 7th out of eight teams.

== Honours ==
=== Regional Competitions ===
- North Fly District
  - Champions: 1999
