= Jamal Seeto =

Papua New Guinean footballer

Personal information
- Full name: Jamal Seeto
- Date of birth: September 8, 1990 (age 36)
- Position: Forward

Senior career*
Years	Team	Apps	(Gls)
2011–	Besta PNG United		

International career^{‡}
2012–	Papua New Guinea	2	(0)
- * Club domestic league appearances and goals ‡ National team caps and goals as of 27 January 2013

Jamal Seeto is a Papua New Guinean footballer who plays as a forward.
