= Valentine Nelson =

Papua New Guinean footballer

Personal information
- Full name: Valentine Nelson
- Date of birth: April 12, 1987 (age 39)
- Position: Defender

Team information
- Current team: Lae City FC (head coach)

Senior career*
Years	Team	Apps	(Gls)
2011–2014	Tukoko University Lae		
2014–2024	Lae City FC		

International career
2011–2024	Papua New Guinea	10	(0)
Medal record
Men's football
Representing Papua New Guinea
OFC Nations Cup
Runner-up	2016 Papua New Guinea
- * Club domestic league appearances and goals

Valentine Nelson is a Papua New Guinean former international footballer who played as a defender.

== Honours ==
Papua New Guinea

- OFC Nations Cup: runner-up, 2016
