= Vudal Gazelle F.C. =

Association football club in East New Britain, PNG

Gazelle
- Full name: Vudal Gazelle Football Club
- Founded: 2019; 7 years ago
- League: Papua New Guinea National Soccer League
- 2019: Islands Conference: 5th

Vudal Gazelle FC, more commonly referred to as Gazelle FC, was a semi-professional association football club based in Kokopo, East New Britain, Papua New Guinea. The club was founded in 2019.

They were late replacements into the 2019 edition of the Papua New Guinea National Soccer League, taking part in the Islands Conference. The club eventually finished 5th out of 5.

== History ==
The club participation in the 2019 Papua New Guinea National Soccer League was confirmed by the PNGFA president John Kapi Natto in February 2019. Throughout the season, the club endured transport and scheduling difficulties: their opening fixture against Greengold Liners on 2 March was postponed as the engine on their boat from Rabaul to Kimbe failed six times. On 12 March, it was reported that matches at the Ceremonial Park in Kokopo would be cancelled until further notice, due to a civil incident involving the burning of houses and vehicles. On Saturday 16 March, the club forfeited their fixture against Chebu AROB in Kimbe with the NSL explaining that they had been unable to get in touch with the team since their departure from East New Britain on the Friday. The club did complete the remainder of their fixtures, but only managed to secure three draws from eight games, losing five and finishing bottom of the conference.

== Domestic record ==
=== National competitions ===
- Papua New Guinea National Soccer League
  - 2019: Islands Conference: 5th
