= Papua New Guinea National Premier League =

Defunct association football league in Papua New Guinea

National Premier League
- Founded: 2017
- Folded: 2018
- Country: Papua New Guinea
- Confederation: OFC
- Divisions: 1
- Last champions: Erema FC (2018)
- Most championships: Hekari United, Erema FC (1 title)
- Current: 2018 PNG National Premier League

The National Premier League was the flagship competition of the Football Federation Papua New Guinea (FFPNG). It was a semi-professional league. It was founded in 2017 after several clubs broke away from the Papua New Guinea Football Association (PNGFA), and ran alongside the National Soccer League as a rival competition. In October 2018, following the merge of the two rival governing bodies, the competition ceased to exist.

== History ==
The National Premier League was founded as a direct result of the re-election of David Chung as President of the PNGFA in December 2016.

During the lead-up to the delayed election of the PNGFA president in December 2016, Hekari United President John Kapi Natto, who at the time was one of three contenders for the presidency, was suspended for 'non-compliance to the FIFA electoral code.' Kapi Natto expressed his frustration at the decision, which came just three weeks before the election, and also claimed that the election was deferred from August to December because incumbent Chung didn't have the numbers to support his re-election. Former acting general secretary of the PNGFA, Noel Mobiha, later condemned the decision, saying it 'was not in the best interests of soccer in the country.' On 29 December 2016, Chung was re-elected as president of the association. The following day, Kapi Natto declared that Hekari United, along with 11 of the 18 other associations affiliated with the PNGFA, would be pulling out of the upcoming National Soccer League season.

The Football Federation Papua New Guinea and the National Premier League were launched on the same day, on 27 February 2017. In April, the National Premier League kicked off with 12 teams involved, with the clubs being split into Northern and Southern Conferences. The Northern Conference consisted of one side that had withdrawn from the National Soccer League – Morobe FC, under the sponsorship of Welgris – as well as Bulolo United, who had taken part in the 2011–12 NSL season, and four new sides: Markham FC, Jesse Nawaeb FC, Laiwaden FC and Lahi United. In the Southern Conference, five sides took part that had withdrawn from the NSL: Hekari United, Erema FC, Admiralty FC, Rapatona FC and Gigira Laitepo United, now under the name of Gigira Amoana. They were joined by newcomers Papaka FC.

After topping the Southern Conference and going through the season unbeaten, Hekari United won the inaugural NPL title after defeating Papaka FC 4–1 in the Grand Final. In the Third-Place Playoff, Markham FC defeated Jesse Nawaeb FC 1–0.

In August 2017, the FFPNG revealed they would be extending the following season's competition to the Highlands and the New Guinea Islands, to incorporate clubs from 'all four corners of the country'. However, this competition failed to materialise, with the 2018 edition being branded as a 'Champions League' competition, with four clubs from the 2017 Northern Conference and four clubs from the 2017 Southern Conference being split into two groups of four. The group winners would progress to the Grand Final, while the runners-up would take part in the Third-Place Playoff. After beating Hekari United 2–1, Erema FC topped the Southern Conference and met Morobe FC in the final, winning 4–3.

According to a report published by ABC News Australia in January 2018, the political rift between the FFPNG and the PNGFA was showing 'no signs of healing'. However, following investigations into corruption, David Chung stepped down from his positions as OFC President and PNGFA President on 6 April 2018, citing personal reasons. Shortly thereafter, members of the FFPNG and the PNGFA agreed to meet, to sort out the issues in football the country, specifically regarding the league split, indicating a league reunification may be possible in the near future.

On 27 October 2018, it was announced that the two rival associations, the PNGFA and the FFPNG, had merged, with the FFPNG being dissolved as per FIFA's instructions. This meant the National Premier League competition would cease to exist, with the clubs taking part once more eligible to apply for the National Soccer League ahead of the planned 2018–19 season.

== Previous winners ==
Previous winners are:

Season	Winner	Score	Runner-up
2017	Hekari United	4–1	Papaka FC
2018	Erema FC	4–3	Morobe FC
