= Morobe United F.C. =

Papua New Guinea football club

Morobe United
- Full name: Welgris Morobe United Football Club
- Nickname: Asa Sumba
- Founded: 1970s
- Ground: LFA Park; Lae, Papua New Guinea
- Capacity: 10,000
- Chairman: Tuguyawini Libe Parindali
Home colours	Away colours

Morobe United FC, formerly known as Blue Kumuls (1970s–2005), Shorncliffe Blue Kumuls (2005), Tuguba Laitepo Blue Kumuls (2006), Morobe Kumuls FC (2007), Gigira Laitepo Morobe FC (2008–2014), Gigira Laitepo Central Coast FC (2011–12), and Welgris Morobe United FC (2015–2018), are a Papua New Guinea professional soccer club founded in the 1970s and based in Lae.

The club last played in the Papua New Guinea National Soccer League, finishing 2nd once and 3rd four times, before defecting to the National Premier League ahead of the 2017 season. Their most successful season came in 2009–10, when they were runners-up in the Grand Final, losing 5–0 to Hekari United. The team finished as runners-up in the 2018 National Premier League season, losing in the Grand Final by 4–3 to Erema FC.

== History ==
=== Foundation and early years ===
The club was founded sometime in the 1970s, but the first record of them playing competitively is from July 1998, when the club took part in the Papua New Guinea National Club Championship. The club were drawn into Pool B, and successfully qualified for the semi-finals. They defeated Guria Lahi by 1–0 in the semi-final before losing to University in the final.

The following year, the club entered the 1999 Lae Regional Championship, finishing fourth in regular season table. However, during their playoff match against Huon Chemical Wests, the side walked off with the score at 2–2. The match was awarded to HC Wests, and the club were dropped to fifth place. In 2000, the club returned to the Lae Regional Championship, finishing in the top two and reaching the Grand Final. They kicked-off against Poro SC on 25 November 2000, but the match was abandoned in the first half, and a replay was scheduled for the following day. The replay finished 1–1, with Poro winning by 4–3 on penalties to claim the title.

In October 2001, the side took part in the National Club Championship after a two-year absence, before losing in the quarter-finals to Rapatona FC. On 24 November 2001, after finishing the regular season top of the table, the side won the Grand Final of the Lae Regional Championship, defeating Goro FC by 2–1.

The side took part in the 2002 National Club Championship. They were drawn into Pool B but missed out on the semi-finals. Later that year, the side finished top of the 2002 Lae Regional Championship, but failed to make the knockout final, eventually finishing third. The following year, they took part in the National Club Championship again, with similar results to the previous season. In the 2003 Lae Regional Championship, they topped the regular season table and progressed to the final, but the result against HC Wests is unknown.

From May–August 2004, the side took part in the newly-formed Lae–Lahi Super League, although they appear to have pulled out midway through the competition. From 7–10 October 2004, the side again took part in the National Club Championship alongside 28 other teams. The side failed to make it out of the group stages again. In November, the side confirmed their qualification to the playoffs of the 2004 Lae Regional Championship, but they were beaten by Tarangau Warders and Huon Chemical Wests and finished 3rd overall. In 2005, the side took part in the Lae Regional Championships once again. They finished top of the eleven-team league and progressed through the playoffs to the final, where they defeated Huon Chemical Wests by 2–1. They qualified for the 2006 National Club Championship as a result, and came third.

=== National Soccer League participation ===
The side was one of the teams that took part in the inaugural National Soccer League season. The side competed against four other clubs and finished second in the regular season table, qualifying for the playoffs. Meanwhile, the side finished 4th in the 2006 Lae Regional Championship. The side's NSL semi-final against Gelle Hills was due to be played on 18 November 2006, but at 0–0 was abandoned due to fading light. The replay saw Morobe slip to a 0–3 deficit, but the side were able to get back into the game before eventually losing 6–5 after extra time. The side proceeded to secure third place, defeating Madang Flying Fox 4–0 in the third-place match.

Morobe returned for the 2007–08 season as one of seven clubs. They started the season strongly, defeating champions Hekari United 3–0 in the opening match before another 3–0 victory over Rapatona saw them enjoy an early league lead. In the 2007 Lae Regional Championship, the side secured third place, missing out on the final after a defeat to Poro SC. By March 2008, they had secured third place in the NSL table, once again qualifying for the playoffs. They faced champions Hekari in the semi-finals, going down 3–1 before again clinching third place with a 3–1 victory over Rapatona in the third-place playoff.

=== Gigira Laitepo sponsorship ===
Ahead of the 2008–09 season, the club received sponsorship from Gigira Laitepo, a daughter company of Hides Gas Development Company. The partnership forced another name change for the club, which would last six years.

The side once again finished third in the Lae Regional Championship, before the club's least successful National Soccer League campaign to date. Despite going unbeaten in their first three games, the side finished 6th out of 8 sides in the league table, failing to qualify for the playoffs for the first time. The following season they returned to form, securing their top four finish on the final day of the season with a 2–2 draw against University Inter. In the semi-final, the club recorded a narrow 1–0 victory over Rapatona to become the first club outside Port Moresby to reach the Grand Final. However, they succumbed 5–0 to reigning champions Hekari in the final. The side also completed their last Lae Regional Championship, finishing third for the third consecutive season.

The 2010–11 season was the worst to date for the club. Following a 6–2 defeat to champions Hekari on the opening day of the season, the side struggled to find any sort of form, and only registered their first win in the fifth round of matches, defeating Besta PNG United 3–2 on 27 November 2010. This would prove to be their only victory in the season, and they finished bottom of the league.

For the 2011–12 season, the side relocated from Lae to the Central region, in order to attract players and fans from that region, and were renamed Gigira Laitepo Central Coast FC. The move initially went well, with the side leading the table at the end of November 2011, and eventually finishing in 4th place, enough to qualify them for the playoffs. However, for unknown reasons, their playoff place was taken by Tukoko University, who finished 5th.

The following year saw the side return to their roots, returning to Lae and reverting to their previous name, Gigira Laitepo Morobe FC. However, in December 2012, there was speculation that the side may not be able to compete in the 2013 season due to lack of additional sponsorship and the removal of their association president. However, on 17 January 2013, it was confirmed that the side would be taking part in the competition. The side finished fourth in the regular season table, qualifying for the playoffs, where they faced champions Hekari in the semi-finals. The side went down 3–0 before being beaten 3–2 by Besta PNG United in the third-place playoff.

The side continued in the league for the 2014 season, winning their opening match 4–0 against newcomers Lae FC thanks to a hat-trick from Jamal Seeto. They finished 4th in the league table, but were once again beaten by Hekari United in the playoff semi-finals, before beating Oro FC in the third-place playoff, securing their third third-placed finish.

=== Welgris sponsorship and split from NSL ===
In September 2014, the future of the club was put in doubt after Gigira Laitepo withdrew their sponsorship. In January, it was confirmed that the side would not be taking part in the upcoming season for the first time in the club's history, with many of their players choosing to move to Lae City Dwellers ahead of the season kick-off.

The side returned ahead of the 2015–16 season, being drawn in the Northern Conference and later picking up sponsorship from Welgris Fuel Distributors. They finished second behind Lae City Dwellers in the Northern Conference, securing qualification for the playoffs, which that season took the form of a four-team group. With just one win from six matches, the side finished third in the table, missing out on qualification for the Grand Final.

On 29 December 2016, the side revealed they were among the 12 sides breaking away from the National Soccer League to form a new association, the Football Federation Papua New Guinea (FFPNG). In February 2017, it was revealed that the side would be joining the newly-launched National Premier League, and taking part in the Northern Conference. Despite being the only former-NSL side in the Northern Conference, the team were unable to qualify for the playoffs, only finishing third in the conference table.

The side returned for the 2018 season as one of four teams in the Northern Conference. In a three-day event, Morobe won two games and drew the third, qualifying for the Grand Final. They faced Erema FC, going down 4–3.

=== Return to NSL ===
Ahead of the 2019 season, the side, no longer sponsored by Welgris, returned to the reunited National Soccer League under the name of Morobe United. The side were drawn into the Northern Conference alongside reigning champions Toti City, whom they faced on the opening day, losing 3–1. However, the side won the remainder of their fixtures until the halfway stage, before a 0–0 draw with Toti continued their push for playoff qualification. A late-season 3–2 defeat to playoff rivals Besta PNG United threatened their playoff hopes, but a 2–1 victory against Markham FC on the penultimate weekend of the season was enough to secure second place in the conference.

In the playoffs, they were drawn against Highlands Conference winners Kagua-Erave FC in the quarter-finals, winning 5–1. A two-legged defeat to Toti City saw them reach the third-place playoff, where they defeated Eastern Stars 3–2 to claim third place for the fifth time.

Ahead of the 2019–20 season, the side lost several of their leading players to new franchise Vitiaz United, and as a result, had a poor season. By the halfway stage, they had won just one game out of nine – a 1–0 win against FC Kutubu thanks to a Jeremy Yasasa winner – and were further depleted in mid-season with several stand-out players joining FC Kutubu, including top scorer Emmanuel Simongi. The side ended up finishing eighth out of ten sides.

== Honours ==
=== National competitions ===
- Papua New Guinea National Club Championship
  - Runners-up: 1998
  - Third place: 2006
- Papua New Guinea National Soccer League
  - Runners-up: 2009–10
  - Third place: 2006, 2007–08, 2014, 2015–16, 2019
- Papua New Guinea National Premier League
  - Runners-up: 2018

=== Regional competitions ===
- Lae Regional Championship
  - Champions: 2001, 2005
  - Runners-up: 2000
  - Third place: 2002, 2004, 2007, 2008, 2009

== See also ==
- Gigira Amoana F.C.
