= Port Moresby Strikers =

Association football club in Papua New Guinea

- Full name: Port Moresby Strikers Football Club
- Nickname: The Strikers
- Short name: PMSFC; SSFC
- Founded: 2017; 9 years ago
- Owner: Gordon Manub
- League: Papua New Guinea National Soccer League
- 2025: NSL, 5th
Home colours	Away colours

Port Moresby Strikers, also known as Southern Strikers, are a professional football club founded in 2017 and based in Port Moresby, Papua New Guinea.

Their best domestic result to date came in the 2018 edition of the Papua New Guinea National Soccer League, when they finished 5th.

== History ==
The club was founded in 2017, shortly before the start of the 2017 National Soccer League season. The side were due to take part alongside six other teams, but failed to show up for their first match. In May 2017, it was reported that the side had deferred their application fee for the following season as the first to confirm their participation in the 2018 season. However, their season didn't get off to the best of starts, losing their first three games, firstly to fellow debutants FC Momase, then to more experienced sides Madang FC and Besta PNG United. Their first victory came in the fourth week against Morobe Wawens, which they defeated 4–3 after having been two goals down. The side failed to win any more matches throughout the season, and were almost suspended from the league in May 2018 after they had failed to fully settle their affiliation fees, but they were subsequently awarded two default victories against Buang FC and FC Momase. This meant the side finished 5th overall, and failed to qualify for the playoffs. In December 2018, it was reported that the side would be returning for the 2019 season, and had been drawn into the Southern Conference. They picked up their first victory in the second round of fixtures, beating newcomers Star Mountain FC 2–1 thanks to a late goal by Renagi Taviri. This would be their only victory of the season, drawing three times and losing ten times to finish bottom of the Southern Conference.

== Domestic record ==
- Papua New Guinea National Soccer League
  - 2017: Withdrew
  - 2018: 5th
  - 2019: Southern Conference: 8th
