= Komara Gulf F.C. =

Association football club based in Papua New Guinea

Komara Gulf
- Full name: Petroleum Resources Kutubu Limited Komara Gulf Football Club
- Founded: 2018; 8 years ago
- Chairman: Havila Kavo
- Head coach: David Aua
- League: Papua New Guinea National Soccer League
- 2026: Champions
Home colours	Away colours

Komara Gulf F.C., currently known for as PRK Komara Gulf for sponsorship reasons, and formerly as Erema Gulf F.C., is a professional soccer club representing the Gulf Province in Papua New Guinea.

The club was outgoing champion of now-defunct Papua New Guinea National Premier League, having won the title in 2018.

== History ==
=== Foundation and early years ===
In July 2014, it was reported that a side representing the Gulf Province, under the name of Erema Gulf FC, had submitted an Expression of Interest ahead of the 2015 Papua New Guinea National Soccer League. This was further boosted in October 2014 by a K45,000 payment from Petroleum Resources Kutubu, who would later go on to sponsor the team. However, their entry was not accepted.

The following season, amidst an expanded field, the side successfully entered the competition, and were drawn into the Southern Conference. With Hekari United winning every single match, there was a close battle for the second qualifying spot, with Erema falling three points short of Rapatona after three wins – against FC Port Moresby, PS United and Gigira Amoana – two draws and five defeats, including 3–0 and 9–3 defeats to Hekari. The side eventually finished 4th in the Southern Conference.

=== League split ===
As part of the domestic league split, Erema broke away from the Papua New Guinea Football Association and joined the rebel Football Federation of Papua New Guinea, and for two seasons took part in its flagship competition, the National Premier League. The side were drawn into the Southern Conference and finished 3rd in the 2017 season, behind Hekari United and Papaka FC.

In the 2018 season, the side were once again drawn into the Southern Conference, alongside Hekari, Admiralty FC and Gigira Amoana. With the sides only playing each other once, a 2–1 victory over Hekari United on 24 February 2018 was enough to see the side top the Southern Conference and progress to the Grand Final. There, they defeated Morobe FC 4–3 to claim their first piece of domestic silverware.

=== Return to NSL ===
In January 2019, it was confirmed that the side would be returning to the now reunited National Soccer League for the 2019 season, once again taking part in the Southern Conference, under a new name – Gulf Komara FC. Former international goalkeeper David Aua was named head coach. The club had a moderate season, remaining in contention to qualify for the playoffs until the penultimate matchday, when a 0–0 draw with FC Bougainville put them too far from their rivals. The club eventually finished 6th out of eight sides.

The side were one of ten teams who took part in the 2019–20 National Soccer League, and they enjoyed a much more successful season, despite a sluggish start. They lost five of their nine games in the first half of the season, sitting sixth at the halfway stage, but key victories against playoff rivals FC Bougainville and Vitiaz United saw them in contention going into the final day, and a 5–0 victory over Star Mountain combined with results elsewhere going their way saw them rise to fourth and qualify for the playoffs at the last possible instance. They were drawn against Minor Premiers Lae City in the playoff semi-final and narrowly lost 2–1, while a 5–0 defeat to Hekari United in the third-place playoff saw them finish the season in fourth.

== League history ==
Gulf Komara league history
Season	Div.	Pos.	Pld.	W	D	L	F	A	Pts.	Playoffs	OFC?
National Soccer League
2006	did not enter										
2007–08	did not enter										
2008–09	did not enter										
2009–10	did not enter										
2010–11	did not enter										
2011–12	did not enter										
2013	did not enter										
2014	did not enter										
2015	did not enter										
2015–16	NSL (South)	4th	10	3	2	5	15	25	11	did not qualify	
National Premier League
2017	NPL (South)	3rd	10	4	3	3	21	18	15	did not qualify	
2018	NPL (South)	1st	3	2	1	0	5	3	7	Champions	did not qualify
National Soccer League
2019	NSL (South)	6th	14	5	2	7	23	21	17	did not qualify	
2019–20	NSL	4th	18	8	1	9	27	28	25	4th	did not qualify

== Honours ==
=== Domestic ===
- Papua New Guinea National Soccer League
  - Champions (1): 2025
- Papua New Guinea National Premier League
  - Champions (1): 2018
