= F.C. Morobe Wawens =

Association football club based in Morobe, PNG

Morobe Wawens
- Full name: AGMARK Football Club Morobe Wawens
- Nickname: The Wawens
- Short name: AFCMW
- Founded: 2014; 12 years ago
- Ground: Sir Ignatius Kilage Stadium
- Capacity: 1,500
- Chairman: Andrew Namuesh
- Head coach: Jossie Kava
- League: Papua New Guinea National Soccer League
- 2025: Runners-up
Home colours	Away colours

AGMARK FC Morobe Wawens are a professional soccer club founded in late 2017 and based in Morobe, Papua New Guinea.

The club took part in their debut Papua New Guinea National Soccer League season in 2018, finishing second in the regular season and as a result, qualifying for the 2019 OFC Champions League at the first time of asking.

== History ==
Shortly before the 2018 Papua New Guinea National Soccer League season, the club declared interest in their participation. They were confirmed in early January. The side started relatively slowly in the campaign, losing their opening match against the previous season's runners-up Madang FC 3–1 after being a goal up, before a narrow 2–1 win over fellow debutants Buang FC allowed them to get their first points on the board. On February 10, the club secured a shock 2–1 victory over NSL veterans Besta PNG United after being a goal down at half-time. A 3–2 defeat to reigning champions Toti City followed, before a 10–1 win over Buang followed, with the side becoming only the second club to ever score double-digits in National Soccer League history, following Hekari United's 10–0 victory over Besta PNG United in the 2009–10 season.

As the season progressed, Wawens continued their good form and went into the latter stages of the season in second place, a position which would qualify them for the 2019 OFC Champions League. This final placing, as well as their qualification for the playoffs, was confirmed on the final matchday, 16 May 2018, after Besta PNG failed to beat Southern Strikers in their game in hand, leaving Wawens two points clear of the third-placed side.

In the semi-finals, played on 20 May 2018, Wawens were narrowly beaten to the final by Besta PNG United, a side they had beaten home and away in the regular season. Wawens went down 1–0, and went on to play Madang FC in the third-place playoff the following weekend, which they won 2–0.

On 25 September 2018, chairman Peter Seske announced that he had secured a sponsorship for the upcoming OFC Champions League and National Soccer League seasons with American company Rush Soccer, a deal which he described as 'historic' for the region and for Papua New Guinea. However, by early 2019, it appeared this sponsorship had evaporated, after it was reported several times in local media that the club were struggling to fund their 2019 OFC Champions League campaign due to lack of sponsorship.

In November 2018, the draw for the 2019 OFC Champions League was announced, with Wawens being drawn into Group B alongside Lautoka of Fiji, AS Central Sport from Tahiti, and the runner-up of the Solomon Islands S-League. However, shortly afterwards, it was reported that both Wawens and Toti City might be expelled from the competition, as neither club were currently members of an affiliate association of the Papua New Guinea Football Association – a requirement to compete. These reports were disputed by chairman Peter Seske. However, both clubs ended up entering the competition. Wawens performed poorly, losing all three of their matches and conceding 19 goals, scoring zero.

The club had a difficult 2019 season, struggling to capture the form that they had found in the previous season, eventually finishing 7th out of eight teams in the Northern Conference. On 30 March, Laiwaden FC goalkeeper Mikes Gewa was kicked in the ribs by Wawens' Jason Farrock, and the player was hospitalised. The player died just under a month later in hospital. It has been suggested that Wawens were unable to complete their fixtures due to risk of retaliation from fans in Madang. After securing sponsorship for the 2019–20 season, the club donated an undisclosed amount of money to Gewa's family.

The club's 2019–20 season was relatively disappointing. Despite picking up their first win of the season on the second matchday against previous season's semi-finalists Morobe United, they struggled both on and off the pitch – having a game awarded 0–3 against them in February 2020 after a dispute with the PNGFA regarding travel funds and outstanding payments from the previous season. They eventually finished ninth out of ten teams in the division.

== Domestic record ==
=== National competitions ===
- Papua New Guinea National Soccer League
  - 2018: 3rd
  - 2019: Northern Conference: 7th
  - 2019–20: 9th

== Continental record ==
- OFC Champions League
  - 2019: 4th in group B

== See also ==
- Rabaul Gurias
