= Lae City F.C. =

Lae City
- Full name: Lae City Football Club
- Founded: 2014; 12 years ago
- Ground: Sir Ignatius Kilage Stadium
- Capacity: 1,500
- President: Edwin Rumbam
- Head coach: Valentine Nelson
- League: Papua New Guinea Premier Soccer League
- 2025: PSL, 3rd (final stage)
Home colours	Away colours

Lae City, formerly known as Lae City Dwellers or Toti City, is a professional soccer club founded in 2014 and based in Lae, Papua New Guinea. The side currently plays in the Papua New Guinea Premier Soccer League, the highest level of soccer competition in PNG.

With seven domestic titles, the club has won the competition more often than any side other than Hekari United; Gulf Komara are the only other club to have won it, doing so for the first time in 2025. The side has competed in four editions of the OFC Champions League, with their best result coming in the 2018 and 2019 editions, when they reached the quarter-finals; the club made its fifth continental appearance on the strength of their regular-season finish in 2025.

== History ==
=== Foundation and first NSL title ===
The club was founded by Raymond Gunemba in 2014, who left Hekari United to form a new club based in Lae under his father Peter's management. It was the formal successor of Lae F.C. The side entered the 2015 National Soccer League season having acquired much of the local talent from Lae due to Morobe FC's withdrawal from the competition. The side performed well in the opening half of the season, despite a 3–0 defeat to Hekari early on, and at the half way stage were just one point behind the reigning champions in second place. In their final match of the regular season, while level on points with opponents Hekari, the side lost 3–1, enough to finish second and qualify for the 2016 OFC Champions League, as well as the NSL playoffs.

In a shock semi-final result, fourth-placed Madang defeated Hekari to deny the eight-time champions a Grand Final berth. That meant Lae's path to the title did not require a victory over Hekari, whom they had never beaten in a competitive match. The side defeated FC Port Moresby 3–1 in their semi-final before a 5–1 victory over Madang granted them their first ever National Soccer League title.

The following season, the 2015–16 National Soccer League, was completed before Lae's debut in the OFC Champions League. With 12 teams entered, Lae and Hekari were separated for the majority of the regular season, with Lae taking part in the Northern Zone, and Hekari in the Southern. Both sides won their respective pools, and alongside Morobe FC and Rapatona, entered the 'National Champions League', a four-team group with the top two qualifying for a single-match final. Lae finished second in the group, behind Hekari, with whom they drew 0–0 and lost 5–0, extending their winless streak against the side. In the Grand Final, however, the side finally broke their streak with a shock 2–0 victory over Hekari, just one week after the 5–0 defeat, to claim their second title and their first competitive victory over Hekari. This would be the last time the two teams would face each other in domestic football for over two years, as Hekari United become one of the clubs to break away from the National Soccer League in late 2016.

=== Continental debut ===
Meanwhile, the side took part in their first ever continental competition, the 2016 OFC Champions League, in April 2016. Despite some competitive matches, including a narrow 2–1 defeat against eventual winners Auckland City FC from New Zealand and an entertaining 5–4 defeat against Solomon Islands' Solomon Warriors, the side lost all three of their group matches.

Due to the league split the start of the 2017 season in Papua New Guinea was delayed until May 2017. That meant the side completed their participation in the 2017 OFC Champions League before the domestic season began. On 11 March 2017, they won their first ever continental match against Malampa Revivors of Vanuatu, winning 5–2. They once again faced Auckland City in their second group fixture, going down 2–0, before an entertaining 5–3 defeat against Western United of the Solomon Islands ended their hopes of qualifying for the semi-finals.

=== League split ===
They returned for the rather chaotic 2017 season in which only six teams took part, and only four completed all of their scheduled fixtures – all four of which, as a result, qualified for the playoffs, with Lae topping the regular season table. Having won their semi-final 2–1 against Besta PNG United, they were due to play Madang in the final, but the NSL board scrapped the final and awarded the championship to Lae, blaming 'the rainy season in Lae, the national elections and the failure of some clubs to pay their fees in full'.

The side returned to defend their title again in the 2018 season, to which they made an excellent start, beating Besta PNG United 3–2 in their opening fixture before an 8–1 thrashing of Buang FC the following weekend and a 7–2 demolishing of the previous season's runners-up Madang in the last week of January 2018. The side headed to Port Vila, Vanuatu, the venue for their 2018 OFC Champions League group stage matches, top of the domestic league with four wins from four.

On 10 February 2018, they defeated Tupapa Maraerenga from the Cook Islands 7–2 in their opening Champions League match, with Raymond Gunemba scoring four goals. Three days later, they secured themselves a spot in the quarter-finals of the competition with a narrow 1–0 victory over Fiji's Ba. They eventually came second in the group after losing 4–1 to hosts Nalkutan, and were drawn against New Zealand's Team Wellington in the quarter-finals, to be played in April.

The club returned to Papua New Guinea for a full set of domestic fixtures in March, and they won a crucial match against FC Morobe Wawens 3–2 on 3 March, which set them on their way to an unbeaten regular season. Before the playoffs though, they travelled to Wellington, New Zealand, for their Champions League quarter-final. On 7 April 2018, they lost 11–0 to Team Wellington, the eventual champions, with head coach Peter Gunemba saying afterwards that he wasn't really sure what went wrong.

The domestic playoff semi-finals were scheduled for 20 May 2018, and Toti City were drawn against Madang FC, who had finished fourth. The underdogs gave the reigning champions a run for their money, with the tie eventually being settled on penalties in Toti City's favour. In the Grand Final on 26 May, the side picked up their fourth straight title with a 3–0 victory over Besta PNG United.

=== League reunification ===
Following the reunification of the two federations in the country, the club returned to the expanded National Soccer League to defend their title, and were drawn into the Northern Conference. The club won their opening game against Morobe United 3–2, before flying to New Caledonia for the group stage of the 2019 OFC Champions League. The club were able to remain unbeaten in the group stage, defeating Malampa Revivors of Vanuatu 4–2 and drawing 3–3 with AS Tefana of Tahiti and 1–1 with hosts (and eventual winners) Hienghène Sport, results which were enough to see them through to the quarter-finals in second place. The side returned to domestic affairs well down in the Northern Conference table, but put together a run of six consecutive victories until a 0–0 draw with Morobe United. By then, the side were top.

On 6 April 2019, the side played nine-time champions Auckland City in New Zealand in the quarter-finals of the 2019 OFC Champions League. The club lost 4–0. The following week, upon their return to Papua New Guinea, the club suffered their only defeat of the domestic season, losing 1–0 to Besta PNG United. They recovered and eventually finished top of the Northern Conference, going on to play Highlands Conference runners-up Blue Kumuls in the quarter-finals. Six goals from Raymond Gunemba helped them to an 8–1 victory. A two-legged victory over Morobe United in the semi-finals followed, before the club picked up their fifth consecutive title on penalties against Hekari United, after the match remained goalless after extra time.

The side were one of ten teams taking part in the 2019–20 Papua New Guinea National Soccer League, and the season was running relatively smoothly until mid-February and their participation in the 2020 OFC Champions League. Following the side's elimination at the group stage, club owner Ian Chow fired manager Peter Gunemba, and a mass exodus of players followed, including key players Raymond Gunemba and Nigel Dabinyaba, who both defected to title rivals Hekari United. Bob Morris was brought in as the new coach, and the side recruited brothers Alwin and Felix Komolong, among others, to replace the departed players. The side went unbeaten in the second half of the season, winning four matches and drawing three to earn the Minor Premiership and qualify for the playoffs. Following victory over fourth-placed Gulf Komara in the semi-finals, the side earned their sixth title with a 1–0 victory over newcomers Vitiaz United in the Grand Final.

=== Two entities ===
Ahead of the 2021 season, it was announced that there would be two clubs competing under similar names – Lae City FC and Lae City Dwellers. The Dwellers side claimed to be the original club, led by coach Peter Gunemba and his sons Raymond and Troy, while the Ian Chow-owned Lae City side continued with the current name and logo, and coach Bob Morris in his role. The new club took the name Lae City FC itself had used until its rename to "Toti City FC" in 2017, and the fixture between the two sides quickly became one of the league's fiercest local derbies, with both claiming to be the "true" Lae City side.

=== Seventh title and the Premier Soccer League era: 2021–2024 ===
Placed in the same Northern Conference as newly formed rivals Lae City Dwellers for the revived two-conference 2021 season, Lae City won the sides' first meeting 4–1 on 31 July 2021. The season was ultimately abandoned without a champion being crowned amid a resurgence of COVID-19 cases in the country.

The competition returned in October 2022, restructured into five regional conferences. Lae City topped the Northern Conference and progressed through the playoffs to the grand final, where they beat Hekari United 1–1 (5–3 on penalties after extra time) to claim their seventh domestic title. Despite this, Hekari United went on to qualify for the 2023 OFC Champions League instead, winning a two-legged play-off between the two grand finalists 4–1 on aggregate. In May 2022, the competition itself was rebranded as the Papua New Guinea Premier Soccer League.

Lae City finished fourth in the regular season of the 2023 season, the first played under the new name, before being eliminated by Hekari United in the semi-finals and losing the third-place play-off to Port Moresby Strikers. The club again finished fourth in the regular season in 2024, but this time recovered in the play-offs, beating Port Moresby Strikers 3–2 after extra time in the third-place match having lost 3–0 to Hekari United in the semi-final.

=== 2025–present ===
Lae City went through the entire 20-match 2025 regular season unbeaten, finishing top of the table on 50 points, but were eliminated on penalties by Morobe Wawens in the semi-finals after a 1–1 draw. The club was then controversially denied the chance to contest the third-place play-off after Hekari United, having been told by the PNGFA's own competition department that the fixture was cancelled, failed to field a team; Lae City, who had not been informed of the cancellation, arrived in Port Moresby with a full squad and were awarded the match by walkover. Club president Edwin Rumbam called the PNGFA's handling of the situation "unprecedented in semi-professional football in PNG" and sought compensation for the club's travel and accommodation costs. Lae City were separately declared minor premiers on the strength of their regular-season position, earning qualification to represent Papua New Guinea at an OFC club competition in Samoa in 2026.

Head coach Manu Whites led the side through the 2025 season, before Valentine Nelson took charge ahead of the 2026 season. Under Nelson, the club extended its unbeaten league run from the previous season and led the table through the early rounds of 2026.

== League history ==
Lae City league history
Season	Div.	Pos.	Pld.	W	D	L	F	A	Pts.	Playoffs	OFC
2006	did not exist										
2007–08	did not exist										
2008–09	did not exist										
2009–10	did not exist										
2010–11	did not exist										
2011–12	did not exist										
2013	did not exist										
2014	did not exist										
2015	NSL	2nd	12	7	2	3	28	16	23	Champions	did not qualify
2015–16	NSL (North)	1st	10	7	2	1	24	16	23	Champions	Group Stage
2017	NSL	1st	10	9	1	0	40	8	28	Champions	Group Stage
2018	NSL	1st	12	10	2	0	46	15	32	Champions	Quarter-Finals
2019	NSL (North)	1st	14	12	1	1	48	13	37	Champions	Quarter-Finals
2019–20	NSL	1st	18	13	4	1	53	15	43	Champions	Group Stage
2021	NSL, Northern Conf.	Season abandoned									
2022	NSL	1st	10	9	1	0	42	9	28	Champions	Lost play-off*
2023	PSL	4th	14	5	6	3	15	10	21	Semi-finals	
2024	PSL	4th	14	5	3	6	19	19	18	3rd place	
2025	PSL	1st	20	15	5	0	49	17	50	3rd place	Qualified (minor premiers)**
2026	PSL	Season in progress									

* Despite winning the 2022 title, Lae City lost a two-legged play-off to runners-up Hekari United to decide the country's 2023 OFC Champions League representative.
** Qualification for a 2026 OFC club competition in Samoa was earned as minor premiers (top regular-season finish) rather than through the grand final.

== Honours ==
=== Continental Competitions ===
- OFC Champions League
  - Quarter-Finalists: 2018, 2019

=== National Competitions ===
- Papua New Guinea National Soccer League
  - Champions: 2015, 2015–16, 2017, 2018, 2019, 2019–20, 2022
