= PNG Hekari FC =

PNG Hekari
- Full name: Papua New Guinea Hekari Football Club
- Nickname: The Red Army
- Founded: 2003; 23 years ago (as POM Souths); 2025; 1 year ago (as PNG Hekari)
- Ground: PNG Football Stadium
- Capacity: 14,800
- President: John Kapi-Natto
- Head coach: Sunil Kumar
- League: Papua New Guinea Premier Soccer League
- 2026: Papua New Guinea Premier Soccer League, 2nd
- Website: https://www.pnghekarifc.com/
Home colours	Away colours

PNG Hekari, formerly known as POM Souths, Souths United, PRK Souths United, Hekari Souths United, and Hekari United, is a professional soccer club formed in 2003, based in Port Moresby, Papua New Guinea. The club plays at the PNG Football Stadium.

The club holds the record for most titles in the Papua New Guinea National Soccer League, having won nine titles, including eight consecutive titles from 2006 to 2014. They are also one of the two clubs from outside Australia and New Zealand to have won the OFC Champions League, and therefore to have represented Oceania at the FIFA Club World Cup, having achieved both in 2010. After chairman John Kapi-Natto spearheaded a split from the National Soccer League in 2017, the club competed for two seasons in the Papua New Guinea National Premier League, winning the inaugural edition. The club returned to the National Soccer League for the 2019 season, finishing second. The club also participates in the OFC Professional League, starting from 2026.

== History ==
=== Foundation and early years ===
The club was first founded in 2003 and entered the Port Moresby First Division, the second level of football in the country's capital. The side finished top of the regular season table, but were beaten to promotion by Sunset FC, who defeated them 3–1 on penalties. The following year, the side went on to win the league, defeating Bavaroko 3–1 in the Grand Final. After their promotion, the club competed in the 2005 Port Moresby Premier League alongside nine other teams. The side finished third in the table and third in the knockout stage, narrowly missing out on the final after a defeat to PS Rutz on 11 September 2005.

=== National Soccer League debut and domination ===
In 2006, the side once again finished third in the Port Moresby Premier League. Having finished the regular season in third place, they lost 2–0 to Rapatona on 1 October 2006 in their semi-final match. Under the name of PRK Souths United, the side finished top of the inaugural 2006 National Soccer League, defeating Madang Flying Fox 5–1 on the final day of the season to snatch the league lead away from TL Blue Kumuls after their defeat to Gelle Hills. The club then defeated Gelle Hills 2–0 in the Grand Final. Kema Jack scored both goals and picked up the Golden Boot as the top scorer throughout the whole NSL season. However, the club failed to qualify for the 2007 OFC Champions League after being defeated by University Inter FC in the Overall Final, losing 4–2 over two legs.

As Hekari Souths United, the club were favoured to retain their title in the 2007–08 season, having obtained the services of Solomon Island internationals Abraham Iniga and Jack Samani. The club carried good form into the season, having won the Port Moresby Premier League for the first time in September, topping the league table by 7 points and then exacting an element of revenge on University Inter by defeating them 2–1 in the Grand Final. The club then finished top of the NSL regular season table too, and won the Grand Final 3–2 against Gelle Hills, with all three goals coming from Kema Jack. This meant they qualified for the 2008–09 OFC Champions League Preliminary Round, where they were granted automatic entry to the finals after both their opponents pulled out. In Group B, they finished second behind Koloale of the Solomon Islands, narrowly missing out on a place in the final.

In what would prove to be their last season in the Port Moresby Premier League, the side finished top of the regular season table and progressed to the Grand Final against newly promoted MacLaren FC, only to have the matched abandoned on 80 minutes, with Hekari trailing 0–1, due to a pitch invasion. The title was eventually handed to MacLaren.

=== OFC Champions League title and Club World Cup ===
Hekari once again qualified for the continental competition after being crowned champions of the 2008–09 National Soccer League. The team finished top of the regular season table, but the Grand Final, set to be played against Rapatona FC, was postponed twice before being cancelled entirely, with the title being awarded to Hekari by virtue of a higher league position.

In October 2009, the club began to take part in the 2009–10 OFC Champions League, changing their name simply to Hekari United, and entering group B alongside Lautoka of Fiji, Tafea from Vanuatu and Marist from Solomon Islands. Despite picking up just one point from their first two games, the club topped the group after four consecutive victories saw them finish ahead of Lautoka by a point. In the two-legged final, Hekari faced two-time winners Waitakere United, and the first leg in Port Moresby saw the Papua New Guinea side win 3–0, with goals coming from Kema Jack (2) and Solomon Islander Alick Maemae. In the return leg in New Zealand, on 2 May 2010, Hekari were able to maintain their aggregate lead, losing 2–1 on the day but winning 4–2 on aggregate and qualifying for the 2010 FIFA Club World Cup in Abu Dhabi, UAE.

Meanwhile, the side won their fourth straight domestic title, topping the regular season table during the 2009–10 National Soccer League and defeating Gigira Laitepo Morobe FC 5–0 in the Grand Final on 24 April 2010. Ahead of the Club World Cup in December 2010, the side recruited Fijian international Osea Vakatalesau and veteran Solomon Islands striker Henry Fa'arodo to bolster their prospects at the competition. However, their FIFA competition debut was short-lived, as they lost 3–0 to hosts Al Wahda in the opening match of the competition.

=== Eight league titles ===
Hekari's defence of the OFC Champions League was unsuccessful in the following season's continental competition. Hekari was placed in the group A alongside Koloale and Lautoka, two sides they had played in previous editions, as well as Vanuatuan champions Amicale, but finished bottom of the group after winning just one of their six matches. On 2 April 2011, the side picked up their fifth domestic title, defeating Eastern Stars 4–0 in the Grand Final, having gone through the season unbeaten.

They once again represented Oceania at the 2011–12 OFC Champions League, and provided a much sterner test, once again facing Amicale and Koloale, finishing ahead of both sides in the group, but were eliminated on 3 March 2012 after a late goal from Auckland City's Alex Feneridis salvaged a draw for their New Zealand opponents. On 15 April 2012, the side won their sixth league title with a 3–0 victory over Eastern Stars, with goals from Taniela Waqa, Kema Jack and Wira Wama.

Due to the delayed start of the 2013 National Soccer League and the new format of the 2012–13 OFC Champions League, the club were faced with a punishing schedule from 2 February through to 1 June 2013, with the club being required to play 22 games over the four-month period – 14 regular-season domestic matches, six Champions League group stage matches, and two domestic playoff matches, including the Grand Final. Despite the OFC format change allowing both the group winners and the runners-up to progress to the knockout-stage, Hekari was unable to capitalise, winning just one game and finishing with 4 points. However, their results domestic remained unaffected, and they clinched their seventh league title with victory over FC Port Moresby, winning 3–0.

Their continental form continued to deteriorate during the 2013–14 OFC Champions League, which underwent another format change. All their group matches took place at Govind Park, home stadium of Ba, in April 2014, and Hekari finished bottom of the group, drawing two of their games and losing the third. Domestically, they reached another Grand Final, which was against Lae FC. Hekari led 3–0 until several Lae FC fans outside the arena fence started throwing stones at the Hekari United players, with Hekari goalkeeper Godfrey Baniau being hit several times. Due to their better regular season record, Hekari were awarded their eighth title shortly afterwards.

=== Decline and split from NSL ===
The 2015 National Soccer League began in January 2015, and Hekari flew to Fiji for the 2014–15 OFC Champions League top of the domestic table. However, the club were drawn into a group with Kiwi side Team Wellington, and a 2–0 defeat to the New Zealand club meant they finished second in Group C, again missing out on the knockout stages. They returned to domestic action and topped the regular season table, and were drawn to face Madang FC in the Championship Playoff Semi-Finals on 16 May 2015. However, in what was described as the 'upset of the decade', Madang came away with a 3–2 victory, ending Hekari's eight-year reign at the top of Papua New Guinean football.

Despite the defeat, Hekari qualified for the 2016 OFC Champions League thanks to finishing top of the regular season table. For the first time, two clubs from Papua New Guinea were invited to the competition, with Lae City Dwellers joining United as winners of the Grand Final. This was not before the domestic season, though, which saw Hekari come through two league stages undefeated, topping both the Southern Conference and the Championship Playoff tables in a new-look season. However, despite having beaten their Grand Final opponents, Lae City Dwellers, 5–0 in the playoff the previous week, Hekari slipped to a 2–0 defeat, handing the Dwellers a second consecutive title. In the OFC Champions League, Hekari scored big wins against AS Lössi of New Caledonia (5–1) and Suva of Fiji (3–0), but were unable to overcome New Zealanders Team Wellington for the second consecutive season, going down 4–0 and being eliminated from the competition at the group stage. However, the side did pick up the Fair Play Award at the end of the tournament.

Following several months of build-up to the delayed PNGFA presidential election, on 30 November 2016, club chairman and presidential candidate John Kapi Natto was suspended from the PNGFA for 'non-compliance to the FIFA electoral code.' This left the door open for incumbent David Chung to win re-election on 28 December 2016, and the following day Kapi Natto announced that Hekari, and 11 other associations across the country, would be pulling out of the PNGFA-organised National Soccer League, as well as the 2017 OFC Champions League.

=== First National Premier League Title ===
From April 2017, Hekari, alongside 11 other clubs, took part in the newly formed National Premier League. Hekari were drawn in the Southern Conference and topped the table, qualifying for the playoffs. After thrashing newcomers Jessa Nawaeb FC 11–0 in the semi-final, Hekari took on Papaka FC in the Grand Final and won 4–0, thanks in part to a hat-trick from striker Tommy Semmy.

In the 2018 edition of the National Premier League, Hekari were drawn in the Southern Conference but were unable to top the group, finishing second and, as a result, failing to qualify for the final. Hekari progressed to the third-place playoff, where they defeated Markham FC 5–1.

=== Return to NSL ===
Following the dissolution of the FFPNG in October 2018 and the merging into the PNGFA, chairman John Kapi Natto declared that Hekari will 'obviously' make a comeback ahead of the 2019 season. Ahead of the new season, the club brought Solomon Islands coach Jerry Allen – the manager who had taken them to the Club World Cup in 2010 – back to the club.

The club was officially announced as rejoining the National Soccer League in January 2019. They were drawn into the Southern Conference, and topped the conference with ease, winning all 14 of their matches and conceding just 12 goals. In the quarter-finals of the playoffs, they defeated West Tribe from the Islands Conference 2–0 with goals from Tutizama Tanito and Kolu Kepo. They faced fellow conference rivals Eastern Stars in a two-legged semi-final, which they came through 4–1 on aggregate, setting up a final against reigning four-time champions Toti City. In their first meeting since the 2016 final, Hekari were defeated 5–4 on penalties after the scores remained 0–0 after extra time. The following day, it was confirmed that the club, alongside Toti, had qualified for the 2020 OFC Champions League.

The club returned for the 2019–20 Papua New Guinea National Soccer League alongside nine other teams. The side went unbeaten in the first half of the regular season and lead the league at the halfway stage. In the meantime, they took part in the group stage of the 2020 OFC Champions League, but were narrowly eliminated after one win, one draw, and one defeat – their sole victory came against Vanuatu side ABM Galaxy, but a 2–1 victory was not enough to overturn their goal difference deficit against that very side. Back at home, coach Jerry Allen went home to the Solomon Islands and was replaced by Erickson Komeng following the enforced five-month break due to the coronavirus pandemic, and the side suffered defeats to Star Mountain and Lae City in the second half of the season, and finished the regular season in second place, behind reigning champions Lae. They thus qualified for the 2021 OFC Champions League and the domestic playoffs. In the playoffs, they suffered a shock defeat to league debutants Vitiaz United on penalties in the semi-finals before defeating Gulf Komara to finish third overall.

=== Fight on two fronts ===
On 15 September 2025, the club unveiled PNG Hekari FC as its new identity, following admission into the OFC Professional League, which determines the Oceania representative for the FIFA Intercontinental Cup and the FIFA Club World Cup. After finishing last in the inaugural 2026 season, they returned to the 2026 Papua New Guinea Premier Soccer League season.

== Sponsorships ==
Period	Kit manufacturer	Shirt sponsor	Other sponsor(s)
2026–		MRDC	Petroleum Resources Kutubu (PRK), Kutubu Security Services (KSS)

== Current squad ==
Note: Flags indicate national team as defined under FIFA eligibility rules; some limited exceptions apply. Players may hold more than one non-FIFA nationality.

No.	Pos.	Nation	Player
1	GK	PNG	Dave Tomare
2	MF	FIJ	Lekima Gonerau
3	DF	PNG	Godfrey Haro
5	DF	PNG	Shane Sakael
6	DF	PNG	Joseph Joe
9	FW	PNG	Ati Kepo
10	FW	SOL	John Orobulu
11	FW	PNG	Rex Naime
12	MF	PNG	Judah Asar
14	FW	PNG	Nathan Eddie
15	MF	PNG	Ritzoki Tamgol

No.	Pos.	Nation	Player
16	FW	PNG	Logan Biwa
17	MF	VAN	John Alick
19	DF	PNG	Nelson Karaun
20	GK	PNG	Nabo Pongi
21	DF	PNG	Naime Reggy
23	DF	PNG	Kasum Gabriel
24	DF	PNG	Nigel Yaka
30	GK	PNG	Christinus Biasu
—	DF	SOL	Leon Kofana
—	MF	SOL	Hudson Oreinima
—	FW	VAN	Walter Leoru

== Coaching staff ==
As of November 2026

Position	Name	Ref.
Head coach	(Fiji) Sunil Kumar	
Assistant coach	(Solomon Islands) Jerry Allen	
Strength and conditioning coach		
Goalkeeping coach		
Physiotherapist		

=== Management ===
Position	Name	Ref.
General manager	(Papua New Guinea) Wira Wama	

== League history ==
Season	Division	League									Other competitions		Top scorer	
Season	Division	P	W	D	L	F	A	Pts	Pos	Finals	OFC Champions League / OFC Professional League	FIFA	Name	Goals
2006	NSL	8	5	1	2	18	8	16	1st	1st	—N/a	—N/a		
2007–08	NSL	12	9	2	1	32	13	29	1st	1st	—N/a	—N/a		
2008–09	NSL	14	12	1	1	32	7	37	1st	1st	GS	—N/a		
2009–10	NSL	15	13	1	1	59	14	40	1st	1st	W	—N/a		
2010–11	NSL	11	10	1	0	37	10	31	1st	1st	GS	7th		
2011–12	NSL	16	13	2	1	55	9	41	1st	1st	GS	—N/a		
2013	NSL	14	12	2	0	47	11	38	1st	1st	GS	—N/a		
2014	NSL	12	9	3	0	39	7	30	1st	1st	GS	—N/a		
2015	NSL	12	8	2	2	29	9	26	1st	3rd	GS	—N/a		
2015–16	NSL	10	10	0	0	39	12	30	1st	2nd	GS	—N/a		
2017	NPL	9	8	1	0	28	10	25	1st	1st	—N/a	—N/a		
2018	NPL	3	2	0	1	15	3	6	2nd	3rd	—N/a	—N/a		
2019	NSL	14	14	0	0	45	12	42	1st	2nd	—N/a	—N/a		
2019–20	NSL	18	13	3	2	39	10	42	2nd	3rd	GS	—N/a		
2021–22	NSL	Unknown							2nd	2nd	PR	—N/a		
2023	NSL	Unknown							1st	1st	GS	—N/a		
2024	PSL	16	13	2	1	40	8	41	1st	1st	GS	—N/a		
2025	PSL	20	12	4	4	34	14	40	3rd	3rd	Semi-finals	—N/a		
2026	PSL										8th			

== OFC Professional League records ==
Season	OFC Professional League								Position	Playoff	Finals	Top goalscorer(s)	
Season	Pld	W	L	D	GF	GA	GD	Pts	Position	Playoff	Finals	Name(s)	Goals
2026	14	2	2	10	14	29	−15	8	8th	4th	Challengers' play-off group	(Papua New Guinea) Joseph Joe	5

== Honours ==
=== Continental competitions ===
- OFC Champions League
  - Champions: 2009–10

=== National competitions ===
- Papua New Guinea National Soccer League/Premier Soccer League
  - Champions (10): 2006, 2007–08, 2008–09, 2009–10, 2010–11, 2011–12, 2013, 2014, 2023, 2024
  - Runners-up: 2015–16, 2019, 2022
- Papua New Guinea National Premier League
  - Champions: 2017

=== Regional competitions ===
- Port Moresby Premier League
  - Champions: 2007
  - Runners-up: 2008
