= Papua New Guinea Football Association =

Sports governing body

OFC
- Short name: PNGFA
- Founded: 1962
- Headquarters: Port Moresby
- FIFA affiliation: 1966
- OFC affiliation: 1966
- President: John Kapi Natto

The Papua New Guinea Football Association, PNGFA is the governing body of soccer in Papua New Guinea.

The PNGFA is a member of both FIFA and OFC, having FIFA and OFC affiliation in 1966 after being founded in 1962. The PNGFA is a member of the Papua New Guinea Olympic Committee, meaning that the PNGFA has control over the men's and women's PNG Olympic football team. In club football, they most notably oversee the Papua New Guinea National Soccer League.

== History ==
The PNGFA was founded in 1962.

In 1966 the PNGFA was one of four founding members of the Oceania Football Confederation.

Association offices first opened in Lae in 1999. The Association’s Academy opened in 2003.

== Presidents ==
- Wep Kanawi
- Madiu Andrew –2004
- David Chung 2004–2018
- John Kapi Natto 2018–present

== See also ==
- Soccer in Papua New Guinea
- Papua New Guinea Premier Soccer League
- Papua New Guinea National Club Championship
- Papua New Guinea FA Cup
