= Papua New Guinea Premier Soccer League =

Association football league in Papua New Guinea

- Organising body: Papua New Guinea Football Association
- Founded: 2006; 20 years ago
- Country: Papua New Guinea
- Confederation: OFC
- Number of clubs: 12
- Level on pyramid: 1
- Relegation to: District leagues
- Domestic cup: Papua New Guinea FA Cup
- International cup(s): OFC Professional League; OFC Champions League
- Current champions: Komara Gulf (2026)
- Most championships: PNG Hekari (10 titles)
- Broadcaster: EMTV (selected matches)
- Current: 2026 Papua New Guinea Premier Soccer League

Papua New Guinea Premier Soccer League is the men's top division of professional soccer in Papua New Guinea. Formed in 2006 as the National Soccer League by the Papua New Guinea Football Association, it replaced the Papua New Guinea National Club Championship as the country's major soccer competition, and was renamed the Premier Soccer League in 2022.

Hekari United have won ten editions of the competition, while Lae City have won seven; the two clubs have met in two grand finals, in 2015–16 and 2019, with Lae City winning both. Komara Gulf are the reigning champions, having won their first title in 2025. The 2026 season has been contested by 12 teams.

== History ==
=== Foundation ===
The National Soccer League was started by David Chung, the President of the Papua New Guinea Football Association (PNGFA), in 2006. It was the first nationwide semi-professional football league, and a step up from the amateur Papua New Guinea National Club Championship, which had been in existence since 1976. In the first season, the semi-professional and amateur champions played a two-legged playoff to decide that year's qualifier for the OFC Champions League.

Since its inception, with the exception of the 2015–16 season, it has consisted of an initial league phase, with each team playing other twice, before the top four teams enter a knockout championship playoff, with the eventual league champion decided in a one-legged grand final.

=== 2006–2012: Early years and Hekari dominance ===
The first eight editions of the competition were won by Hekari United / PNG Hekari FC, under different names. In 2006, five teams entered the competition from five different provinces: Port Moresby (PRK Souths United), Lae (TL Blue Kumuls), Central Province (Gelle Hills), Madang (Madang Flying Fox) and Mount Hagen (Welgris Momads). A sixth side, to come from Lae, Kimbe or Bougainville, eventually did not enter. PRK Souths United won, defeating Gelle Hills 2–0 in the Grand Final. However, they failed to qualify for the OFC Champions League after a 4–2 aggregate defeat to amateur side University Inter in the Overall Final.

The 2007–08 season was played in late 2007 and early 2008, and became known as the Telikom NSL Cup, due to sponsorship reasons. All five of the founding members entered once again, albeit under various names: TL Blue Kumuls became Morobe FC; Welgris Momads became Welgris Highlanders; PRK Souths United became Hekari United; and Madang Flying Fox became simply Madang Fox. Furthermore, two new teams entered, Rapatona FC and Besta Madang. The top four teams in the regular season qualified for the Championship playoffs, with Hekari United finishing top of the regular season and defeating Gelle Hills in the final again.

In the 2008–09 season, the league was expanded to eight teams, albeit with three from the previous season not taking part. Madang Fox and Besta Madang withdrew, while Gelle Hills application was rejected in favour of a new tem Sepik FC. Also joining the league were Eastern Stars, Nabasa United and University Inter. Hekari and Inter were first and second in the regular season table, but it was Hekari and Rapatona who were due to meet in the Grand Final; however, following postponements on 21 March and 28 March, the PNGFA awarded the championship and qualification to the OFC Champions League to Hekari United by virtue of their higher league position.

The 2009–10 season saw the league expanded once again, to encapsulate nine teams. Sepik FC withdrew after failing to submit a letter of interest, while Welgris Highlanders missed the application deadline. Nabasa United also withdrew, while Gelle Hills and Madang Fox were reinstated. There were new entries from Tukoko University FC and Besta PNG United, the latter of which acted as the national U-20 squad. Hekari United again finished top of the regular season table, and played Gigira Laitepo in the Grand Final, winning 5–0.

For the first time since its inception, the number of teams decreased ahead of the 2010–11 season, with Gelle Hills, Rapatona FC and University Inter all withdrawing, while Petro Souths FC joined the league for the first time. That left seven sides taking part, with Hekari finishing the season unbeaten and top of the league, defeating Eastern Stars 4–0 in the final.

The 2011–12 season saw relative stability within the league, with only one side (Madang Fox) withdrawing, being replaced by new entrants Bulolo United. Hekari United once again finished top of the regular season and played Eastern Stars in the Grand Final for the second consecutive season, winning 3–0.

In July 2012, PNGFA president and league founder David Chung was named as a recipient of the Order of the British Empire in the Queen's Birthday Honours list.

=== 2013–2016: Difficulties and disillusionment ===
2013 saw a delay. By late December 2012, only four teams had completed the registration process: defending champions Hekari United, Besta United PNG, Welgris Highlanders, returning from a three-year absence, and newcomers West New Britain Tavur. Another new franchise, FC Port Moresby, joined in early January. The NSL had decided to go ahead with the league with just six teams, the lowest since the inaugural season. Morobe FC and NC Civil Works Oro FC, submitted their registration on the same day. This led to Hekari United's owner, John Kapi Natto, urging the NSL to re-adjust the league to cater for all teams. It was on 29 January that the teams were confirmed, with the addition of Eastern Stars.

The NSL board took further criticism from new side WNB Tavur. The NSL contractually paid for the travel costs, but were unwilling to cover the more expensive travel costs. This led to Tavur playing three consecutive away matches, to avoid back and forth travel costs. The season concluded on 1 June, with Hekari United claiming their seventh consecutive title, winning 3–0 against FC Port Moresby in the Grand Final.

The 2014 season initially had 12 interested teams, but by 21 October, only seven had completed the registration process, including new sides Admiralty FC and Lae FC. The previous season's finalists FC Port Moresby had not done so, and neither had last year's debutants WNB Tavur. Both ended up excluded from the competition, with FC Port Moresby eventually lodging an appeal. This led to another delay, with the start date being postponed three times before eventually starting on 8 February, after FC Port Moresby withdrew their case. In April 2014, Morobe FC's owner Tuguyawini Libe Parindali accused the National Soccer League of being too expensive, claiming that there was no incentive to keep competing in the division. This was in response to the NSL's decision to stop subsidising airfares, accommodation, food and transport for away games, something they had done since the inception of the league in 2006.

On the pitch, Hekari United were awarded their eighth consecutive league title on 24 May 2014, despite the Grand Final being abandoned after 70 minutes due to crowd violence. With Hekari leading 3–0, several Lae FC fans started throwing stones, with Hekari goalkeeper Godfrey Baniau being hit several times. Some claimed that the referee was biased towards Hekari United, with the decision to send off Lae captain Kohu Liem causing the outrage, while others blamed the organisers who failed to clear supporters who had not paid for the event.

Ahead of the 2015 season, Gigira Laitepo, who had sponsored Morobe FC for the entirety of their eight-year league history, withdrew their sponsorship throwing the franchise into disarray. The club ended up withdrawing from the league, as did Eastern Stars and Lae FC. Toti City F.C., a new franchise under similar management to the previous year's runners-up, took the place of Lae, while FC Port Moresby returned, as did Madang FC after a three-year absence.

The season became the first in history that Hekari didn't win the title; the eight-time champions were beaten by Madang FC in the semi-finals of the playoffs, despite finishing the regular season top of the table. Madang went on to lose 5–1 to Toti City in the final, with the Lae club winning the title after just two years of existence. The 2015-16 season saw unprecedented interest, with 12 teams successfully signing up, and the organisers taking a decision to split the division into two zones, northern and southern. New teams included PS Huawei, Erema FC, Goroka Gosiha and Rapatona FC, the latter of whom was returning to the competition after a five-year absence. Morobe FC, now under the sponsorship of Welgris, also returned. The top two teams from each zone entered a second group stage, and the top two teams facing off once again in the final. For the second season in a row, Toti City won the title, ahead of Hekari United, winning 2–0.

=== 2017–2018: League split ===
Towards the end of 2016, several cumulative events triggered many clubs across Papua New Guinea to split from the PNGFA-organised National Soccer League, eventually forming a rival association, the Football Federation Papua New Guinea (FFPNG). On 29 December 2016, Chung was re-elected as president of the association. The following day, Kapi Natto declared that Hekari United, along with 11 of the 18 other associations affiliated with the PNGFA, would be pulling out of the upcoming National Soccer League season.

On 2 February 2017, Hekari were disqualified from the 2017 OFC Champions League after the PNGFA filed a complaint. The ruling claimed that by making derogatory statements regarding the PNGFA, as well as several players failing to report for international duty, the club had engaged in behaviour that damaged the integrity of football. Despite this, NSL competition manager Simon Koima maintained that Hekari's participation in the 2017 National Soccer League was still possible, but on 27 February, Kapi Natto launched the Football Federation Papua New Guinea and its flagship competition, the National Premier League. The 2017 National Soccer League kicked off in May, with only 4 teams from the previous season remaining: Lae City Dwellers, Madang FC, PS Huawei and Besta PNG United. New sides included Buang FC and Southern Strikers. The season was riddled with difficulties, beginning with new side Southern Strikers withdrawing without playing a match. They were replaced by Vitis Yamaros FC. After several deferred and even cancelled matches, the season was set to conclude with the playoffs in August. However, PS Huawei disbanded before their rearranged playoff semi-final, while the NSL cancelled the Grand Final. Lae City Dwellers were declared champions, having maintained the best regular season record.

The 2018 season started with Southern Strikers successfully replacing Vitis Yamaros FC, while many (aside from disbanded PS Huawei) remained in the division, alongside new sides FC Morobe Wawens and FC Momase. Lae City Dwellers were renamed Toti City Dwellers for sponsorship reasons. In early January, the PNGFA was banned from using all PNG Sports Foundation facilities due to outstanding payments from the 2016 FIFA U-20 Women's World Cup, which took place in the country. On May 3, it was decided that all the remaining matches were to be forfeited, as only four sides – Toti City, Besta PNG United, Morobe Wawens and Madang – had paid their affiliation fee in full. However, by the following week, Southern Strikers settled their fee, and their remaining matches were rescheduled, while Buang and Momase had 0–3 defeats awarded in the remaining fixtures.

Following investigations into corruption, David Chung stepped down from all roles on 6 April. Members of both the PNGFA and the FFPNG agreed to hold talks regarding the league split and other issues surrounding the sport in the country. In the Grand Final, Toti City Dwellers defeated Besta PNG United 3–0 on 26 May to win their fourth straight title.

=== 2019–2021: League reunification and COVID-19 ===
On 27 October 2018, after over 18 months of division within the sport domestically, the PNGFA and the FFPNG reunited, with John Kapi Natto becoming the new president. Plans for the 2019 season were announced in November 2018, with the expectation of four separate regions: Southern (Papua), Northern (Momase), Highlands and Islands. The competition kicked off on 26 January 2019, with a record 27 teams taking part across all regions of the country. On 30 March, Laiwaden FC goalkeeper Mikes Gewa was kicked in the ribs by Morobe Wawens' Jason Farrock, and the player was hospitalised. The player died under a month later. It was revealed that the National Soccer League hadn't taken out medical insurance to cover its players. The format of the playoffs caused controversy, mainly because teams from the same regional division were not kept apart until the final. Furthermore, the format was changed twice within a month, leading Eastern Stars' chairman Joseph Ealedona to describe it as fraud at the highest level. PNGFA chairman Kapi Natto responded to the criticism by distancing the association from the management of the NSL, and stating that he believed the draws were done after taking into consideration the costs involved. Nevertheless, the playoffs continued, and the two previous champions, Hekari United and Toti City, ended up meeting in the Grand Final. Following a goalless scoreline after 120 minutes, Toti City won their fifth consecutive title, winning 5–4 overall.

The start of the 2019–20 season was delayed several times, having originally planned an expansion to include a two-tier system, with a national Premier Division and a regional Conference Division. However, lack of interest led to the cancellation of the Conference Division, and a ten-team competition was announced on 10 December. The season was completed despite an enforced five-month break due to the COVID-19 pandemic, with Lae City picking up their sixth title after a 1–0 victory over Vitiaz United in the grand final. The 2021 season was also delayed, originally scheduled to begin on July 17. The season was ultimately abandoned without a champion being crowned, amid a resurgence of COVID-19 cases in the country.

=== 2022–present: Rebranding and the Premier Soccer League era ===
The competition returned in October 2022, played across five regional conferences — Southern, Northern, Highlands, New Guinea Islands Central and New Guinea Islands Eastern — a structure last used in 2015–16. The playoff series, postponed from its original December 2022 date, concluded in February 2023 with Lae City beating Hekari United 5–3 on penalties after a 1–1 draw, claiming their seventh domestic title. Both grand finalists subsequently met in a two-legged play-off to decide Papua New Guinea's 2023 OFC Champions League representative; Hekari United won 4–1 on aggregate to claim the berth, despite having lost the domestic final.

In May 2022, the competition was rebranded as the Papua New Guinea Premier Soccer League. The first season played under the new name ran from July to December 2023 with eight clubs, and was won by Hekari United, who beat newcomers Lae City Dwellers 1–0 in the grand final. Hekari United retained the title in 2024, beating Gulf Komara 2–1 in the grand final, before Gulf Komara won their maiden title in 2025, defeating FC Morobe Wawens 3–1.

Ahead of the 2026 season, the PNGFA registered 12 clubs — the most in the competition's history — including four newcomers, and long-time champions Hekari United rebranded as PNG Hekari FC. PNG Hekari finished last in the inaugural 2026 OFC Professional League before returning to the domestic competition. The season was launched on 28 May 2026 in Port Moresby and began on 30 May, with the regular season played as a double round-robin, ahead of a knockout playoff series.

== Format ==
The competition's structure has varied considerably across its history. In most seasons it has consisted of a league phase, in which participating clubs play each other at least once, followed by a knockout series among the top four placed teams, comprising semi-finals, a third-place play-off, and a one-legged grand final. Notable exceptions include the 2015–16 season, which used a two-zone system culminating in a top-two play-off; the 2019 season, contested across four regional divisions by a record 27 clubs; and the 2022 season, which reverted to a five-conference regional format. Since the Premier Soccer League rebrand, the competition has generally featured a single national division of 8 to 12 teams. The winner, and in some seasons the runner-up, qualified for the OFC Champions League.

== Sponsorship ==
The league has been known under various sponsorship names throughout its history. The 2007–08 season was sponsored as the Telikom NSL Cup. From 2019, the competition was known as the Kumul Petroleum Holdings Limited National Soccer League, or KPHL National Soccer League, for sponsorship reasons. As of the 2026 season, the competition had no confirmed title sponsor.

== Teams ==
12 teams contested the 2026 season, drawn primarily from Port Moresby and Lae, with further representation from Kerema, Madang, Milne Bay Province, Manus Province and Finschhafen District. The number of participants has fluctuated considerably across the competition's history, from a low of five in the inaugural 2006 season, to a high of 27 spread across four regions in 2019.

== Results ==
=== National Soccer League (2006–2022) ===
Season	Winner	Runner-up	Score	Third place	Fourth place	Score
2006	Hekari United	Gelle Hills	2–0	Morobe FC	Madang FC	4–0
2007–08	Hekari United	Gelle Hills	3–2	Morobe FC	Rapatona	3–1
2008–09	Hekari United	Rapatona	w/o†	University Inter	Welgris Highlanders	w/o†
2009–10	Hekari United	Morobe FC	5–0	Rapatona	University Inter	3–1
2010–11	Hekari United	Eastern Stars	4–0	Tukoko University	Besta PNG United	w/o†
2011–12	Hekari United	Eastern Stars	3–0	Besta PNG United	Tukoko University	N/A
2013	Hekari United	Port Moresby	3–0	Besta PNG United	Morobe United	3–2
2014	Hekari United	Lae FC	3–0	Morobe United	Oro FC	unknown
2015	Lae City	Madang	5–1	Hekari United	Port Moresby	3–0
2015–16	Lae City	Hekari United	2–0	Morobe United	Rapatona	N/A*
2017	Lae City	Madang	w/o†	Besta PNG United	PS United	w/o†
2018	Lae City	Besta PNG United	3–0	Morobe Wawens	Madang	2–0
2019	Lae City	Hekari United	0–0 (P) 5–4	Morobe United	Eastern Stars	3–2
2019–20	Lae City	Vitiaz United	1–0	Hekari United	Komara Gulf	5–0
2021	Abandoned due to the pandemic					
2022	Lae City	Hekari United	1–1 (P) 5–3	Komara Gulf	Lae Natives	0–1

=== Papua New Guinea Premier Soccer League (2022–present) ===
Season	Winner	Runner-up	Score	Third place	Fourth place	Score
2022–23	Hekari United	Lae City Dwellers	1–0	Port Moresby Strikers	Lae City	1–0
2024	Hekari United	Komara Gulf	2–1	Lae City	Port Moresby Strikers	3–2 (AET)
2025	Komara Gulf	Morobe Wawens	3–1	Lae City	Hekari United	unknown (Note: A third-place play-off between Hekari United and Lae City was reported ahead of the 2025 grand final, and Lae City F.C.'s own listed 2025 result confirms a third-place finish, but the score of that match was not found in the sources consulted.)

Notes:

- † Final not played, championship (and third-place) awarded to best regular season team.
- # Match abandoned after 70 minutes.
- (*) Third place determined by league position in National Champions League.
- && Information disponible on OFC website.

== Statistics by team ==
Team	1st place	2nd place	3rd place	4th place
PRK Souths / Hekari United / PNG Hekari	10	4	2	0
Toti City / Dwellers / Lae City	7	0	2	1
Komara Gulf	2	1	1	1
Madang FC	0	2	0	2
Eastern Stars	0	2	0	1
Gelle Hills	0	2	0	0
Morobe FC	0	1	5	1
Besta PNG United	0	1	3	1
Rapatona	0	1	1	2
Morobe Wawens	0	1	1	0
Port Moresby	0	1	0	1
Lae FC	0	1	0	1
Vitiaz United	0	1	0	0
Lae City Dwellers	0	1	0	0
University Inter	0	0	1	1
Tukoko University	0	0	1	1
Port Moresby Strikers	0	0	1	2
Lae Natives	0	0	0	1
Welgris Highlanders	0	0	0	1
Oro FC	0	0	0	1
PS United	0	0	0	1

== Top goalscorers ==
Season	Goalscorer	Team	Goals
2006	(Papua New Guinea) Kema Jack	Hekari United	11
2007–08	(Papua New Guinea) Kema Jack	Hekari United	15
2009–10	(Papua New Guinea) Kema Jack	Hekari United	
2011–12	(Papua New Guinea) Raymond Gunemba	Hekari United	10
2015	(Papua New Guinea) Nigel Dabinyaba	Lae City Dwellers	11
2015–16	(Papua New Guinea) Koriak Upaiga	Maristas	
2019–20	(Papua New Guinea) Jonathan Allen	FC Bougainville / Vitiaz United	12
2024	(Papua New Guinea) Logan Biwa	United Highlands	11
2026	(Papua New Guinea) Tommy Semmy	PNG Hekari	23
