= Soccer in Papua New Guinea =

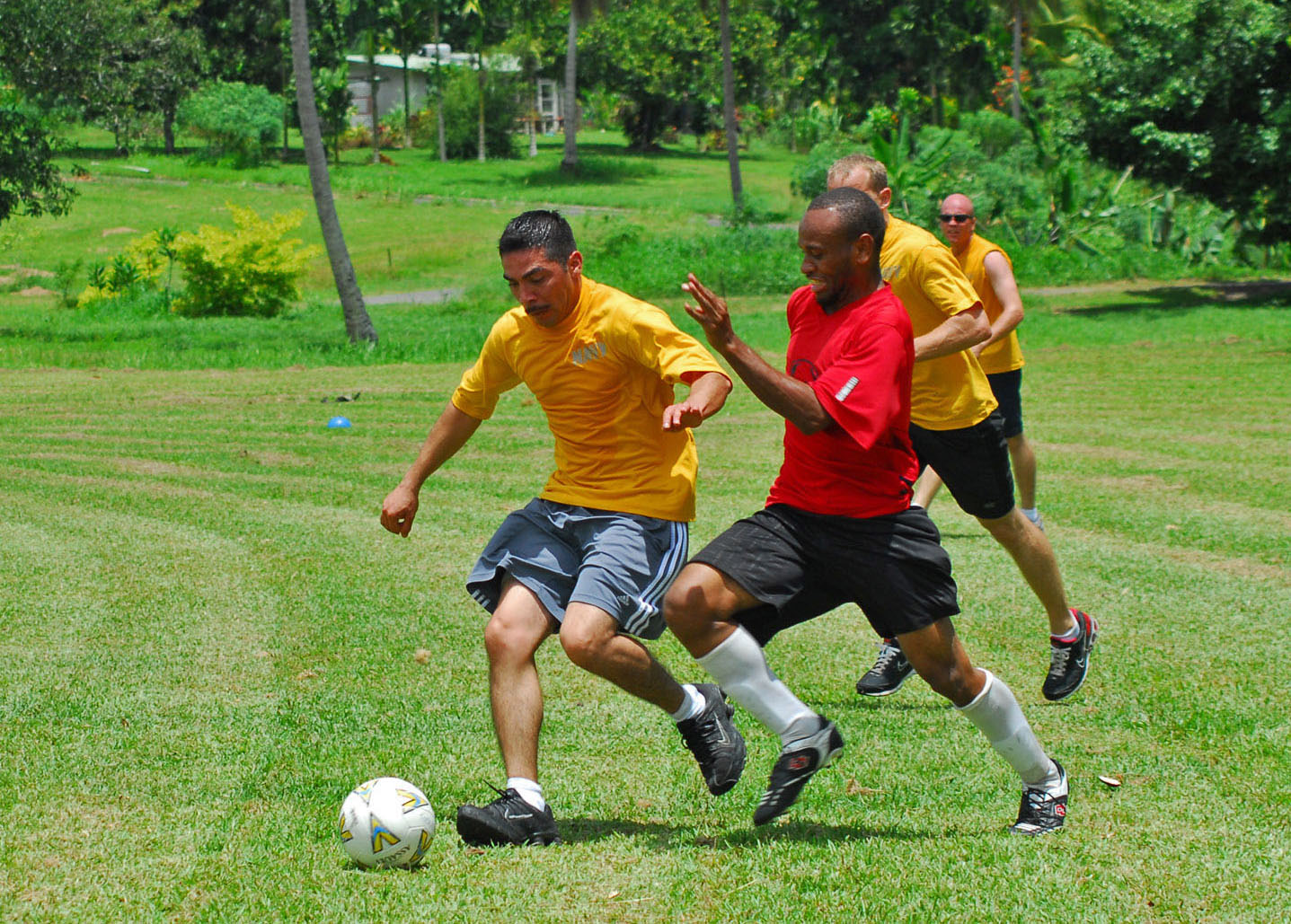
- Footballers in Papua New Guinea
- Country: Papua New Guinea
- Governing body: Papua New Guinea Football Association
- National teams: men's national team women's national team national futsal team

Club competitions
- Papua New Guinea Premier Soccer League; Papua New Guinea National Club Championship; Papua New Guinea FA Cup

International competitions
- OFC Professional League; OFC Champions League

The sport of soccer in the country of Papua New Guinea is run by the Papua New Guinea Football Association. The association has been affiliated with FIFA and the Oceania Football Confederation since 1966. The association administers national soccer and futsal teams, as well as the national league. Around 30% of the people in the country are considered soccer fans.

In 2016, Papua New Guinea hosted the U-20 Women's World Cup.

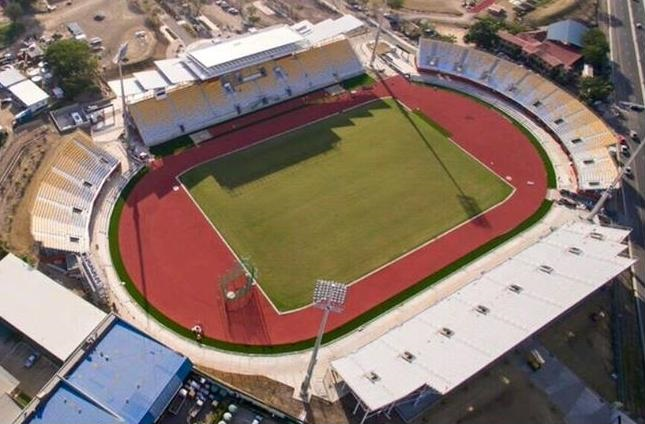
The 15,000-capacity Sir John Guise Stadium is used for association football matches.

== League system ==
Level	League(s)/Division(s)
1	Papua New Guinea National Soccer League; 12 clubs

Top clubs from PNG have been participating in the Oceania Champions League. In the 2009–10 season, Hekari United won that competition and went on to represent Oceania at the 2010 FIFA Club World Cup.

== Winners ==
Season	Winner
Papua New Guinea Overall Championship
1976	Mopi FC (1)
1977	Germania FC (1)
1978	Tarangau SC (1)
1979	Tarangau SC (2)
1980	No competition
1981	Mopi FC (2)
1982	Buresong FC (1)
1983	No competition
1984	Buresong FC (2)
1985	No competition
1986	Guria Port Moresby (1)
1987	Westpac FC (1)
1988	Guria Lahi (1)
1989	Guria Port Moresby (2)
1990	Leipon Manus (1)
1991	Not known
1992	Guria Port Moresby (3)
1993	Not known
1994	Not known
1995	ICF University (1)
1996	ICF University (2)
1997	ICF University (3)
1998	ICF University (4)

Season	Winner
1999	Guria Lahi (2)
2000	Unitech FC (1)
2001	Sobou FC (1)
2002	Sobou FC (2)
2003	Sobou FC (3)
2004	Sobou FC (4)
2005	Sobou FC (5)
Papua New Guinea National Soccer League
2006	Hekari United (1)
2007–08	Hekari United (2)
2008–09	Hekari United (3)
2009–10	Hekari United (4)
2010–11	Hekari United (5)
2011–12	Hekari United (6)
2013	Hekari United (7)
2014	Hekari United (8)
2015	Toti City FC (1)
2015–16	Toti City FC (2)
2017	Toti City FC (3)
2018	Toti City FC (4)
2019	Toti City FC (5)
2019–20	Toti City FC (6)
2021	Cancelled
Papua New Guinea Premier Soccer League
2022–23	Hekari United (9)

== Women's soccer ==
Women's soccer is a minority pursuit in the country.

== Attendances ==
The average attendance per top-flight football league season and the club with the highest average attendance:

Season	League average	Best club	Best club average
2024	179	Hekari United	312

Source: League page on Wikipedia
