= 2017 OFC U-19 Women's Championship squads =

The following is the squad list for the 2017 OFC U-19 Women's Championship. Each squad consisted of 20 players in total, 2 of whom had to be goalkeepers.

== Fiji ==
Head coach: (Fiji) Saroj Kumar

No.	Pos.	Player	Date of birth (age)	Caps	Goals	Club
1	GK	Ateca Tuwai	9 June 1998 (age 27)	0	0	(Fiji Football Association) Ba
2	DF	Cecelia Nainima	20 May 1999 (age 26)	0	0	(Fiji Football Association) Ba
3	DF	Mereoni Tora	26 October 1998 (age 27)	0	0	(Fiji Football Association) Ba
4	DF	Sekola Waqanidrola	18 March 1998 (age 28)	0	0	(Fiji Football Association) Rewa
5	DF	Veniana Ranadi	16 July 1998 (age 27)	0	0	(Fiji Football Association) Ba
6	MF	Ledua Senisea	14 April 2000 (age 26)	0	0	(Fiji Football Association) Nadi
7	MF	Koleta Likuculacula	17 August 2000 (age 25)	0	0	(Fiji Football Association) Ba
8	MF	Timaima Vuniyayawa	31 July 1998 (age 27)	0	0	(Fiji Football Association) Rewa
9	FW	Asenaca Diranuve	25 May 2000 (age 25)	0	0	(Fiji Football Association) Savusavu
10	FW	Luisa Tamanitoakula	28 July 1998 (age 27)	0	0	(Fiji Football Association) Ba
11	MF	Cema Nasau	15 November 1999 (age 26)	0	0	(Fiji Football Association) Ba
12	MF	Silina Qarawaqa	10 January 1999 (age 27)	0	0	(Fiji Football Association) Ba
13	MF	Louisa Simmons	3 March 2000 (age 26)	0	0	(Fiji Football Association) Ba
14	FW	Miriama Bakaniceva	21 January 2000 (age 26)	0	0	(Fiji Football Association) Tailevu Naitasiri
15	MF	Maca Ralagi	5 June 1999 (age 26)	0	0	(Fiji Football Association) Rewa
16	MF	Aliza Hussein	23 July 2000 (age 25)	0	0	(Fiji Football Association) Ba
17	DF	Miliana Bureitau	19 May 1999 (age 26)	0	0	(Fiji Football Association) Navua
18	FW	Cynthia Dutt	3 September 2000 (age 25)	0	0	(Fiji Football Association) Labasa
19	DF	Laca Tikosaya	13 April 2000 (age 26)	0	0	(Fiji Football Association) Ba
20	GK	Francine Lockington	14 August 1999 (age 26)	0	0	(Fiji Football Association) Lautoka

== New Caledonia ==
Head coach: (France) Kamali Fitialeata

No.	Pos.	Player	Date of birth (age)	Caps	Goals	Club
1	GK	Karine Xozame	15 November 1999 (age 26)	0	0	(New Caledonian Football Federation) AS Wetr
2	DF	Darnelle Hace	16 October 2000 (age 25)	0	0	(New Caledonian Football Federation) Pole des Iles
3	DF	Josephine Sakilia	10 November 1999 (age 26)	0	0	(New Caledonian Football Federation) OMS Paita
4	DF	Ami-Nata Ajapuhnya	11 March 1999 (age 27)	0	0	(New Caledonian Football Federation) AS Wetr
5	DF	Sonia Hnanganyan	23 September 1998 (age 27)	0	0	(New Caledonian Football Federation) OMS Paita
6	MF	Isabelle Ilengo	29 July 2000 (age 25)	0	0	(New Caledonian Football Federation) Pole des Iles
7	DF	Oceane Forest	12 September 1998 (age 27)	0	0	(New Caledonian Football Federation) Lössi
8	MF	Shaya Ihmeling	9 January 1999 (age 27)	0	0	(New Caledonian Football Federation) Gaïtcha FCN
9	FW	Alice Wenessia	24 July 1999 (age 26)	0	0	(New Caledonian Football Federation) Gaïtcha FCN
10	MF	Marie-Laure Palene	16 July 2001 (age 24)	0	0	(New Caledonian Football Federation) OMS Paita
11	DF	Jeanine Humunie	26 October 2000 (age 25)	0	0	(New Caledonian Football Federation) Pole des Iles
12	MF	Johana Takamatsu	11 December 1999 (age 26)	0	0	(New Caledonian Football Federation) OMS Paita
13	MF	Ivonne Xowi	22 July 2000 (age 25)	0	0	(New Caledonian Football Federation) Gaïtcha FCN
14	MF	Cassidy Cawa	5 April 2000 (age 26)	0	0	(New Caledonian Football Federation) AS Wetr
15	FW	Valerie Holue	2 December 1999 (age 26)	0	0	(New Caledonian Football Federation) Tiga Sports
16	MF	Danatienne Baly	25 April 2000 (age 26)	0	0	(New Caledonian Football Federation) Pole des Iles
17	MF	Moisette Broustet	3 November 1999 (age 26)	0	0	(New Caledonian Football Federation) OMS Paita
18	FW	Isabelle Hnaweongo	18 February 1999 (age 27)	0	0	(New Caledonian Football Federation) Pole des Iles
19	MF	Marie Waneux	15 June 2000 (age 25)	0	0	(New Caledonian Football Federation) OMS Paita
20	GK	Kathleen Waunie	7 August 1999 (age 26)	0	0	(New Caledonian Football Federation) Lössi

== Papua New Guinea ==
Head coach: (Papua New Guinea) Rachel Wadunah

No.	Pos.	Player	Date of birth (age)	Caps	Goals	Club
1	GK	Faith Kasiray	20 December 1999 (age 26)	1	0	(Papua New Guinea Football Association) Vitis Yamaros
20	GK	Amatha Mistera	15 July 1999 (age 26)	0	0	(Papua New Guinea Football Association) Hearts
2	DF	Natasha Sagem	12 November 1999 (age 26)	0	0	(Papua New Guinea Football Association) Tusbab Kumuls
3	DF	Margret Joseph	4 January 1999 (age 27)	2	0	(Papua New Guinea Football Association) Vitis Yamaros
4	DF	Isabella Natera	24 December 1999 (age 26)	0	0	(Papua New Guinea Football Association) Marlins
5	DF	Bridget Paime	15 January 2000 (age 26)	0	0	(Papua New Guinea Football Association) Hearts
6	DF	Francisca Mani	18 June 1999 (age 26)	0	0	(Papua New Guinea Football Association) Eriku Wawen
14	DF	Leah Karo	28 November 1998 (age 27)	0	0	(Papua New Guinea Football Association) Hearts
7	MF	Marity Sep	4 July 1999 (age 26)	0	0	(Papua New Guinea Football Association) Vitis Yamaros
8	MF	Alison Paulias	11 February 1999 (age 27)	0	0	(Papua New Guinea Football Association) Eriku Wawen
12	MF	Bellinda Giada	1 December 1999 (age 26)	3	0	(Papua New Guinea Football Association) Vitis Yamaros
13	MF	Ramona Padio	13 March 1998 (age 28)	3	0	(Papua New Guinea Football Association) Murat
15	MF	Robertlynn Kig	15 March 1999 (age 27)	0	0	(Papua New Guinea Football Association) Marlins
16	MF	Serah Tamgol	14 September 1999 (age 26)	0	0	(Papua New Guinea Football Association) Similin
19	MF	Gorethy Paofa	27 December 1999 (age 26)	0	0	(Papua New Guinea Football Association) Eriku Wawen
9	FW	Selina Unamba	24 November 1999 (age 26)	1	0	(Papua New Guinea Football Association) Eriku Wawen
10	FW	Nicollete Ageva	26 February 1998 (age 28)	3	1	(Papua New Guinea Football Association) Tusbab Kumuls
11	FW	Mercedes Hapoto	5 June 1999 (age 26)	0	0	(Papua New Guinea Football Association) Marlins
17	FW	Melisa Jofari	3 March 1999 (age 27)	0	0	(Papua New Guinea Football Association) Tusbab Kumuls
18	FW	Jacklyne Maiyosi	18 July 1998 (age 27)	3	0	(Papua New Guinea Football Association) Tusbab Kumuls

== Samoa ==
Head coach: (Samoa) Martin Tamasese

No.	Pos.	Player	Date of birth (age)	Caps	Goals	Club
1	GK	Katarina Ah Sui	July 2, 1998 (age 27)	0	0	(Football Federation Samoa) Vailele Unity
18	GK	Jecky Toma	April 28, 1999 (age 27)	0	0	(Football Federation Samoa) Faleasiu
2	DF	Renee Atonio	February 7, 1998 (age 28)	0	0	(Football Federation Samoa) Moataa
3	DF	Hunter Malaki	March 1, 2000 (age 26)	0	0	(United States Soccer Federation) Rush
4	DF	Epi Tafili	September 15, 1998 (age 27)	0	0	(Football Federation Samoa) Moataa
5	DF	Mariecamillia Ah Ki	October 4, 2000 (age 25)	0	0	(Football Australia) University of Queensland
13	DF	Mole Saofaiga	August 18, 2000 (age 25)	0	0	(Football Federation Samoa) Vaimoso
16	DF	Conzuella Vatu	July 21, 2000 (age 25)	0	0	(Football Federation Samoa) Vaimoso
6	MF	Sonya Tanuvasa	March 6, 1999 (age 27)	0	0	(Football Federation Samoa) Vaimoso
7	MF	Rachel Tagatauli	February 29, 2000 (age 26)	0	0	(United States Soccer Federation)
11	MF	Matalena Faasavalu	August 13, 1998 (age 27)	0	0	(Football Federation Samoa) Vailele Unity
12	MF	Talaiesea Mulitalo	July 1, 1999 (age 26)	0	0	(Football Federation Samoa) Sapapalii
14	MF	Emele Paletasala	September 4, 1999 (age 26)	0	0	(Football Federation Samoa) BSL Vaitele Uta
15	MF	Natiflo Pereira	November 27, 1998 (age 27)	0	0	(Football Federation Samoa) Vaimoso
19	MF	Kalia Kapisi	July 30, 2000 (age 25)	0	0	(United States Soccer Federation) Manaia
20	MF	Tiffany Rabaino	September 24, 1999 (age 26)	0	0	(United States Soccer Federation)
8	FW	Liana Soifua	September 6, 2000 (age 25)	0	0	(United States Soccer Federation)
9	FW	Tianna Sekona	May 2, 1998 (age 28)	0	0	(United States Soccer Federation) Utah Soccer Alliance
10	FW	Shalom Fiso	May 4, 1999 (age 27)	0	0	(Football Federation Samoa) Vailele Unity
17	FW	Sophia Aveau	October 2, 1999 (age 26)	0	0	(United States Soccer Federation) Manaia

== Tonga ==
Head coach: (Tonga) Tiane Koaneti

No.	Pos.	Player	Date of birth (age)	Caps	Goals	Club
1	GK	Mele Akolo	4 May 2000 (age 26)	0	0	(Tonga Football Association) Navutoka
20	GK	Adrienne Tahitua	11 January 1999 (age 27)	0	0	(Tonga Football Association) Veitongo
2	DF	Heilala Moala	2 February 1999 (age 27)	0	0	(Tonga Football Association) Veitongo
3	DF	Michelle Tuitupou	29 October 1998 (age 27)	0	0	(New Zealand Football) Manukau City
4	DF	Meleseini Tufui	2 February 2000 (age 26)	4	0	(Tonga Football Association) Veitongo
5	DF	Manusiu Latavao	29 September 1998 (age 27)	4	0	(Tonga Football Association) Marist
14	DF	Patricia Likiliki	30 January 2001 (age 25)	0	0	(Tonga Football Association) Longolongo
15	DF	Luseane Vivili	19 June 2000 (age 25)	0	0	(Tonga Football Association) Longolongo
17	DF	Kalolaine Taliauli	22 February 2000 (age 26)	0	0	(Tonga Football Association) Fasi & Afi
18	DF	Sosefina Havea	15 January 2000 (age 26)	0	0	(Tonga Football Association) Riviera
6	MF	Siunipa Talasinga	11 April 2002 (age 24)	0	0	(Tonga Football Association) Veitongo
7	MF	Seini Lutu	25 March 2001 (age 25)	7	0	(Tonga Football Association) Veitongo
8	MF	Halaunga Taholo	10 October 1998 (age 27)	4	0	(Tonga Football Association) Longolongo
9	MF	Carmel Uhila	24 October 2001 (age 24)	0	0	(New Zealand Football) Central United
12	MF	Ofa Ataongo	24 June 2002 (age 23)	0	0	(Tonga Football Association) Riviera
16	MF	Katalina Taliauli	28 February 1998 (age 28)	0	0	(Tonga Football Association) Fasi & Avi
19	MF	Alexandra Fifita	4 October 1999 (age 26)	0	0	(Tonga Football Association) Fasi & Afi
10	FW	Malia Tongia	9 April 1998 (age 28)	7	5	(Tonga Football Association) Lapaha
11	FW	Mele Kafa	20 January 2002 (age 24)	0	0	(Tonga Football Association) Navutoka
13	FW	Peta Fenukitau	15 January 1999 (age 27)	0	0	(Tonga Football Association) Riviera
