= 2009–10 Papua New Guinea National Soccer League =

Papua New Guinea National Soccer League
- Season: 2009–10
- Dates: 14 November 2009 – 24 April 2010
- Champions: Hekari United (4th title)
- 2010–11 OFC Champions League: Hekari United
- Top goalscorer: Kema Jack

The 2009–10 Papua New Guinea National Soccer League season, known as the Telikom NSL Cup for sponsorship reasons, was the fourth edition of Papua New Guinea National Soccer League.

The title was won by Hekari United, who won their fourth consecutive title thanks to a 5–0 victory over Morobe FC in the Grand Final. Hekari striker Kema Jack won his third Golden Boot trophy, while Emmanuel Simon of Besta PNG United won the award for Player of the Season.

== Teams ==
There were nine teams in the competition which was one more than the previous season. Welgris Highlanders, having finished 4th last season, failed to meet the deadline to submit their team, meaning for the first time, there would be no representative from the Highlands Region of the country. Sepik FC failed to submit a letter of interest. Nabasa also withdrew.

Gelle Hills and Madang Fox rejoined the league after a year's absence, while there were debuts for Tukoko University and Besta PNG United, the latter of whom acted as a development side for the Papua New Guinea national team under-20s.

Papua New Guinea National Soccer League 2009–10
Team	Region	Previous best	Other honours
Hekari United	Southern	2006, 2007–08, 2008–09: Champions	2007 Port Moresby Premier League: Champions
Gelle Hills United	Southern	2006, 2007–08: Runners-Up	None
CMSS Rapatona Tigers	Southern	2008–09: Runners-Up	1984, 1999 National Club Championship: Runners-Up 1989, 2004 Port Moresby Premier League: Champions
Gigira Laitepo Morobe	Northern	2006, 2007–08: 3rd (as Morobe Kumuls FC)	1998 National Club Championship: Runners-Up 2001, 2005 Lae Regional Championship: Champions
University Inter F.C.	Southern	2008–09: 3rd	2007–08 OFC Champions League: Preliminary round 1995, 1996, 1997, 1998, 2006 National Club Championship: Champions 1996, 1998, 2001, 2002, 2006 Port Moresby Premier League: Champions
Madang Niupetro Fox	Northern	2006: 4th	None
Eastern Stars F.C.	Southern	2008–09: 5th	None
Tukoko University Lae F.C.	Northern	N/A	2000 National Club Championship: Champions 2001, 2003, 2005, 2008 Lahi Regional League: Champions
Besta PNG United	Southern	N/A	None

== Format ==
In the regular season, each team played each other twice. The team at the top of the league after all matches were played was crowned 'Minor Premiers' and secured qualification for the 2010–11 OFC Champions League. At the end of the regular season, the top four teams advanced to a knockout competition, the winners of which were crowned Champions.

== Summary ==
By 1 October 2009, it was confirmed that nine teams had confirmed their participation ahead of the new season, the largest number of teams since the league's inception in 2006.

The league kicked-off on 14 November 2009, with Rapatona enjoying an early league lead after a 6–2 demolition of debutants Tukoko University. However, it was reigning champions Hekari United who set the early pace, producing 5–1 and 6–1 victories over Eastern Stars and Besta PNG United on match days two and three respectively. Going into December, they and Rapatona were level on points at the top of the league with three wins from three.

Moving into December, both Hekari and Rapatona had their match day four fixtures postponed, and a 2–0 win for Gelle Hills over Besta PNG drew them level on points with the two sides ahead of match day five, which was Hekari's bye week. A 4–2 win for Rapatona over Besta, and Gelle Hills' 0–0 draw with University Inter, saw Rapatona lead the league with 12 points ahead of Gelle on 10, with Hekari down in third on nine. On December 16, Hekari United played their rearranged fixture against University Inter, the side who had pipped them to OFC Champions League qualification in 2007 and finished second behind them in the previous season. Inter came away with a shock 1–0 victory thanks to a Tau Winnie goal and a heroic performance from former Hekari goalkeeper Leslie Kalai. This, combined with Rapatona's draw with Eastern Stars, left Hekari one point behind Gelle Hills and four behind Rapatona, with a game in hand on both.

In the final match day before the winter break, only two of the four scheduled matches took place: Hekari United cut Rapatona's lead at the top of the table to two points after a convincing 3–0 win over Gelle Hills, while the league leaders could only draw 1–1 with Inter.

In the first set of fixtures after the winter break, the top two played each other, with Rapatona maintaining their two-point lead thanks to a 1–1 draw against Hekari. However, the following week, Hekari defeated Tukoko University 5–1 while Gelle Hills held Rapatona to a draw, and the side returned to the top of the table on goal difference. From that moment, Hekari didn't look back, winning the remainder of their matches to ease to the regular season title with several weeks to spare.

The race for the playoffs, however, was far more interesting. After the final matches of the first round of fixtures, just five points separated Rapatona in second and Gelle Hills in sixth, with Morobe and the two university sides, Tukoko and Inter, all involved in the race. Eastern Stars sat just three points further back in seventh, with a game in hand. As February rolled into March, no side was really able to remain consistent, with Hekari's closest challengers Rapatona suffering a shock 2–1 defeat to bottom club Besta PNG on March 6, while the rest of the playoff challengers took points off each other. With four weeks to go, just seven points separated Rapatona in second, with 22, and Eastern Stars and Gelle Hills, who were tied in sixth and seventh on 15. Crucially, however, Stars and Hills had only three matches left to play, while the teams directly above them – Morobe, 21, and Inter and Tukoko, 18 – had four.

On March 13, Hekari routed Gelle Hills 5–1 to all but end Hills' hopes of qualifying for the playoffs. Elsewhere, Inter and Rapatona both consolidated their positions with a goalless draw, while Tukoko University's hopes were damaged after they failed to beat Besta PNG, with the score ending 3–3. The following weekend, Hekari were confirmed as Minor Premiers with a 6–2 victory over Rapatona. While the two university sides fought out a 1–1 draw, Eastern Stars came from a goal down to defeat Morobe 4–3 in a thrilling game which put them level on points with their opponents, but with just one match left to play. At this stage, five sides were still capable of making the playoffs, with just three points separating second from sixth.

On the penultimate match day, March 27, Eastern Stars could only sit and watch as Rapatona, Morobe and University Inter all picked up victories, which ensured Rapatona's qualification to the playoffs, and, given the current goal difference, meant Morobe and Inter, who played each other in the final set of fixtures the following weekend, would probably need just a point to join them. Indeed, Inter came from a goal down to force a 2–2 draw against Morobe on the first weekend of April, which saw them both through to the playoffs, despite Eastern Stars' third straight victory, a 6–2 romp of Besta PNG.

In the playoffs, Hekari thrashed University Inter 7–1, thanks in part to a hat-trick from Kema Jack. In the other semi-final, Morobe reached their first Grand Final with a narrow 1–0 victory over Rapatona, becoming the first team outside of the Port Moresby province to ever reach the Grand Final. While Rapatona secured third place with a 3–1 win over Inter, Hekari confirmed their dominance to claim their fourth straight title with a 5–0 win against Morobe in the final.

== Regular season ==
Pos	Team	Pld	W	D	L	GF	GA	GD	Pts	Qualification
1	Hekari United (C)	15	13	1	1	59	14	+45	40 (Note: One match could not be played.)	Qualified for the 2010–11 OFC Champions League Group Stage
2	Rapatona Tigers	16	6	8	2	30	23	+7	26	Qualified for the Championship Playoff
3	Gigira Laitepo Morobe	16	7	4	5	29	23	+6	25	Qualified for the Championship Playoff
4	University Inter	16	6	6	4	25	18	+7	24	Qualified for the Championship Playoff
5	Eastern Stars FC	16	7	3	6	37	36	+1	24	
6	Tukoko University Lae FC	16	6	5	5	30	34	−4	23	
7	Gelle Hills United	16	4	3	9	14	29	−15	15	
8	Madang Niupetro Fox	15	2	4	9	22	33	−11	10	
9	Besta United PNG	16	1	4	11	19	55	−36	7	

Source: RSSSF
Rules for classification: 1) points; 2) goal difference; 3) number of goals scored.
(C) Champions

== Championship playoff ==
Semi-finals
Hekari United FC	7
University Inter	1
Rapatona Tigers	0
Gigira Laitepo Morobe	1

Final
Hekari United FC	5
Gigira Laitepo Morobe	0
Third place
Rapatona Tigers	3
University Inter	1

=== Semi-finals ===
10 April 2010

Hekari United FC	7–1	University Inter
Pita Bolatoga; Kema Jack; Alick Maemae; Andrew Lepani		Harold Demo

Lloyd Robson Oval, Port Moresby
10 April 2010

Rapatona Tigers	0–1	Gigira Laitepo Morobe
		Kohu Liam

Lloyd Robson Oval, Port Moresby

=== Third place match ===
24 April 2010

Rapatona Tigers	3–1	University Inter
Sowera Guti; Hamson Daniel (o.g.); Raymond Gunemba		Niel Hans

Lloyd Robson Oval, Port Moresby

=== Final ===
24 April 2010

Hekari United FC	5–0	Gigira Laitepo Morobe
Kema Jack 30', 32'; Alick Maemae 40' (pen.); David Muta 65'; Benjamin Mela 85'

Lloyd Robson Oval, Port Moresby
