= Papua New Guinea women's national under-20 soccer team =

Papua New Guinea football team

Papua New Guinea Women's U-20
- Nickname(s): Lakatois (Motuan sailing vessel)
- Association: Football Federation Samoa
- Confederation: OFC (Oceania)
- Head coach: (Papua New Guinea) Rachel Wadunah
- Most caps: Bernadine Giobun
- Top scorer: Nicollette Ageva (7)
- Home stadium: Hubert Murray Stadium
- FIFA code: PNG
First colours	Second colours

First international
- Papua New Guinea 0–0 Solomon Islands (Port Moresby, Papua New Guinea; April 20, 2004)

Biggest win
- Papua New Guinea 6–1 Fiji (Apia, Samoa; April 2, 2006)

Biggest defeat
- Papua New Guinea 1–14 Australia (Port Moresby, Papua New Guinea; April 24, 2004)

World Cup
- Appearances: 1 (first in 2016)
- Best result: Group stage (2016)

OFC U-20 Women's Championship
- Appearances: 7 (first in 2004)
- Best result: Second place (2004, 2012, 2014)

The Papua New Guinea U-20 women's national soccer team is the national under-20 women's soccer team of Papua New Guinea in international women's football. They are controlled by the Papua New Guinea Football Association. They are the only team besides New Zealand who have competed in a FIFA U-20 Women's World Cup, they did this when they hosted the 2016 FIFA U-20 Women's World Cup with the national team finished bottom of their group.

== Records ==
=== FIFA U-20 Women's World Cup ===
Year	Result	M	W	D	L	GF	GA
(Canada) 2002	Did not enter						
(Thailand) 2004	Did not qualify						
(Russia) 2006	Did not qualify						
(Chile) 2008	Did not qualify						
(Germany) 2010	Did not enter						
(Japan) 2012	Did not qualify						
(Canada) 2014	Did not qualify						
(Papua New Guinea) 2016	Group stage	3	0	0	3	1	22
(France) 2018	Did not qualify						
(Costa Rica) 2022	Did not qualify						
(Colombia) 2024	Did not qualify						
(Poland) 2026	To be determined						
Total	1/12	3	0	0	3	1	22

=== OFC Championship Record ===
OFC U-20 Women's Championship
Year	Round	Pld	W	D	L	GF	GA	GD
(Tonga) 2002	Did not Participate							
(Papua New Guinea) 2004	Runners-up	2	0	1	1	1	14	–13
(Samoa) 2006	Third Place	5	3	0	2	14	8	+6
(New Zealand) 2010	Did not Participate							
(New Zealand) 2012	Runners-up	3	1	1	1	5	9	–4
(New Zealand) 2014	Runners-up	3	2	0	1	8	3	+5
(Tonga) 2015	Did not Participate							
(New Zealand) 2017	Third Place	5	2	1	2	14	17	–3
(Cook Islands) 2019	Group stage	2	1	0	1	2	8	-6
(Fiji) 2023	Group stage	2	0	0	2	0	13	–13
Total	7/10	22	9	3	10	44	72	–28

== Current technical staff ==
Position	
Head coach	(Papua New Guinea) Rachel Wadunah
Assistant coach	(Papua New Guinea) Bernadine Giobun
Team manager	(Papua New Guinea) Isalyn Modakewau
Technical Support	(Papua New Guinea) Margaret Aka

== Current squad ==
The following players were called up for the 2019 OFC U-19 Women's Championship from 30 August–12 September in Avarua, the Cook Islands.

Caps and goals updated as of 6 September 2019, after the game against Tonga.

No.	Pos.	Player	Date of birth (age)	Caps	Goals	Club
1	GK	Benadette Rupi	7 April 2002 (age 24)	2	0	(Papua New Guinea Football Association)
20	GK	Olive Nangan	23 May 2003 (age 23)	0	0	(Papua New Guinea Football Association)
2	DF	Fidorah Namuesh (captain)	4 December 2002 (age 23)	2	0	(Papua New Guinea Football Association)
3	DF	Norma Kasiray	22 November 2002 (age 23)	1	0	(Papua New Guinea Football Association)
4	DF	Susan Manas	9 September 2001 (age 25)	2	0	(Papua New Guinea Football Association)
6	DF	Jerolyn Gala	4 August 2001 (age 25)	2	0	(Papua New Guinea Football Association)
17	DF	Carol Albert	4 March 2001 (age 25)	0	0	(Papua New Guinea Football Association)
19	DF	Joan Uttie	1 May 2001 (age 25)	0	0	(Papua New Guinea Football Association)
5	MF	Nicole Bekio	12 February 2001 (age 25)	2	1	(Papua New Guinea Football Association)
7	MF	Abigail Wagol	18 April 2001 (age 25)	2	0	(Papua New Guinea Football Association)
8	MF	Shalom Waida	15 February 2001 (age 25)	2	0	(Papua New Guinea Football Association)
11	MF	Kenziro Samson	30 March 2001 (age 25)	0	0	(Papua New Guinea Football Association)
13	MF	Jasmine Vago	16 February 2002 (age 24)	2	0	(Papua New Guinea Football Association)
16	MF	Sagude Zale	13 May 2004 (age 22)	0	0	(Papua New Guinea Football Association)
18	MF	Mareerose Wadunah	23 February 2004 (age 22)	0	0	(Papua New Guinea Football Association)
9	FW	Asaiso Gossie	18 April 2003 (age 23)	2	1	(Papua New Guinea Football Association)
10	FW	Ruth Giada	6 February 2003 (age 23)	2	0	(Papua New Guinea Football Association)
12	FW	Sylvia Jangiko	3 May 2002 (age 24)	2	0	(Papua New Guinea Football Association)
14	FW	Christie Maneu	17 August 2004 (age 22)	0	0	(Papua New Guinea Football Association)
15	FW	Dephney Pari	5 August 2001 (age 25)	2	0	(Papua New Guinea Football Association)

== 2017 Squad ==
The following players were called up to for the 2017 OFC U-19 Women's Championship.

Caps and goals correct after match against Samoa on July 24, 2017.

No.	Pos.	Player	Date of birth (age)	Caps	Goals	Club
1	GK	Faith Kasiray	20 December 1999 (age 26)	5	0	(Papua New Guinea Football Association) Vitis Yamaros
20	GK	Amatha Mistera	15 July 1999 (age 27)	1	0	(Papua New Guinea Football Association) Hearts
2	DF	Natasha Sagem	12 November 1999 (age 26)	5	0	(Papua New Guinea Football Association) Tusbab Kumuls
3	DF	Margret Joseph	4 January 1999 (age 27)	7	0	(Papua New Guinea Football Association) Vitis Yamaros
4	DF	Isabella Natera	24 December 1999 (age 26)	4	0	(Papua New Guinea Football Association) Marlins
5	DF	Bridget Paime	15 January 2000 (age 26)	3	0	(Papua New Guinea Football Association) Hearts
6	DF	Francisca Mani	18 June 1999 (age 27)	0	0	(Papua New Guinea Football Association) Eriku Wawen
14	DF	Leah Karo	28 November 1998 (age 27)	4	0	(Papua New Guinea Football Association) Hearts
7	MF	Marity Sep	4 July 1999 (age 27)	2	0	(Papua New Guinea Football Association) Vitis Yamaros
8	MF	Alison Paulias	11 February 1999 (age 27)	2	0	(Papua New Guinea Football Association) Eriku Wawen
12	MF	Bellinda Giada	1 December 1999 (age 26)	7	0	(Papua New Guinea Football Association) Vitis Yamaros
13	MF	Ramona Padio	13 March 1998 (age 28)	8	3	(Papua New Guinea Football Association) Murat
15	MF	Robertlynn Kig	15 March 1999 (age 27)	0	0	(Papua New Guinea Football Association) Marlins
16	MF	Serah Tamgol	14 September 1999 (age 27)	4	0	(Papua New Guinea Football Association) Similin
19	MF	Gorethy Paofa	27 December 1999 (age 26)	1	0	(Papua New Guinea Football Association) Eriku Wawen
9	FW	Selina Unamba	24 November 1999 (age 26)	6	1	(Papua New Guinea Football Association) Eriku Wawen
10	FW	Nicollete Ageva	26 February 1998 (age 28)	8	8	(Papua New Guinea Football Association) Tusbab Kumuls
11	FW	Mercedes Hapoto	5 June 1999 (age 27)	0	0	(Papua New Guinea Football Association) Marlins
17	FW	Melisa Jofari	3 March 1999 (age 27)	4	0	(Papua New Guinea Football Association) Tusbab Kumuls
18	FW	Jacklyne Maiyosi	18 July 1998 (age 28)	8	3	(Papua New Guinea Football Association) Tusbab Kumuls

== Squad for the 2016 FIFA U-20 Women's World Cup ==
The following players were called up to for the 2016 FIFA U-20 Women's World Cup.

Caps and goals correct after match against North Korea on November 20, 2016.

No.	Pos.	Player	Date of birth (age)	Caps	Goals	Club
1	GK	Lavina Hola	27 May 1996 (age 30)	2	0	(Papua New Guinea Football Association)
20	GK	Lace Kunei	12 October 1997 (age 29)	0	0	(Papua New Guinea Football Association)
21	GK	Faith Kasiray	20 December 1999 (age 26)	1	0	(Papua New Guinea Football Association)
3	DF	Margret Joseph	4 January 1999 (age 27)	2	0	(Papua New Guinea Football Association)
4	DF	Olivia Upaupa	12 March 1997 (age 29)	2	0	(Papua New Guinea Football Association)
5	DF	Hilda Nake	10 April 1997 (age 29)	3	0	(Papua New Guinea Football Association)
7	DF	Martha Karl	23 October 1997 (age 28)	2	0	(Papua New Guinea Football Association)
11	DF	Christol Mato	22 January 1998 (age 28)	2	0	(Papua New Guinea Football Association)
15	DF	Gloria Laeli	25 March 1997 (age 29)	3	0	(Papua New Guinea Football Association)
16	DF	Georgina Bakani	6 December 1996 (age 29)	0	0	(Papua New Guinea Football Association)
6	MF	Yvonne Gabong	29 August 1996 (age 30)	3	0	(Papua New Guinea Football Association)
8	MF	Loretta Yagum	21 March 1999 (age 27)	3	0	(Papua New Guinea Football Association)
9	MF	Selina Unamba	24 November 1999 (age 26)	1	0	(Papua New Guinea Football Association)
12	MF	Bellinda Giada	1 December 1999 (age 26)	3	0	(Papua New Guinea Football Association)
13	MF	Ramona Padio	13 March 1998 (age 28)	3	0	(Papua New Guinea Football Association)
14	MF	Ellien Manup	17 July 1997 (age 29)	1	0	(Papua New Guinea Football Association)
19	MF	Joy Tsuga	6 February 1998 (age 28)	0	0	(Papua New Guinea Football Association)
2	FW	Jabeth Bani	21 June 1996 (age 30)	3	0	(Papua New Guinea Football Association)
10	FW	Nicollete Ageva	26 February 1998 (age 28)	3	1	(Papua New Guinea Football Association)
17	FW	Esmeralda Waipo	22 January 1998 (age 28)	2	0	(Papua New Guinea Football Association)
18	FW	Jacklyne Maiyosi	18 July 1998 (age 28)	3	0	(Papua New Guinea Football Association)

== Head-to-head record ==
The following table shows Papua New Guinea's head-to-head record in the FIFA U-20 Women's World Cup.

Opponent	Pld	W	D	L	GF	GA	GD	Win %
Brazil	1	0	0	1	0	9	−9	0.00
North Korea	1	0	0	1	1	7	−6	0.00
Sweden	1	0	0	1	0	6	−6	0.00
Total	3	0	0	3	1	22	−21	0.00

== See also ==
- Papua New Guinea women's national football team (Senior)
- Papua New Guinea women's national under-17 football team
- Papua New Guinea men's national under-20 football team
- Football in Papua New Guinea
