= 2006 Papua New Guinea National Soccer League =

Papua New Guinea National Soccer League
- Season: 2006
- Dates: 3 September – 25 November 2006
- Champions: PRK Souths United (1st title)
- 2007–08 OFC Champions League: University Inter (via Continental Playoff)
- Top goalscorer: Kema Jack (11 goals)

The 2006 Papua New Guinea National Soccer League season was the first edition of the Papua New Guinea National Soccer League, and the first ever semi-professional football competition held in the country.

The title was won by PRK Souths United, who topped the regular season table and defeated Gelle Hills United in the Grand Final. Kema Jack, playing for PRK Souths, picked up the Golden Boot.

== Teams ==
Five teams entered the competition, representing five different associations across the country.

National Soccer League 2006
| Team | Association | Region | Honours |
|---|---|---|---|
| PRK Souths United | Port Moresby | Southern | 2004, 2005 Port Moresby Premier League: 3rd 2003 Port Moresby First Division: Champions |
| Tuguba Laitepo Blue Kumuls | Lae | Northern | 1998 National Club Championship: Runners-Up 2001, 2005 Lae Regional Championship: Champions |
| Welgris Momads | Mount Hagen | Highlands | 2005 National Club Championship: 3rd 2005 Highlands Regional Championship: Champions |
| Gelle Hills United | Central Province | Southern | None |
| Madang Flying Fox | Madang | Northern | None |

A sixth team, who were due to come from Lae, Kimbe or Bougainville, did not enter.

== Format ==
In the regular season, each team played each other twice. The team at the top of the league after all matches were played was crowned 'Minor Premiers'. At the end of the regular season, the top four teams advanced to a knockout competition, the winners of which were crowned Champions.

Unlike subsequent seasons, the winner of the league did not secure qualification to the OFC Champions League. Instead, the playoff winner would face off against the winner of the 2006 Papua New Guinea National Club Championship to decide who would represent Papua New Guinea in the Oceanic competition.

== Summary ==
With an odd number of teams, ten rounds of action were scheduled, with one team taking a bye each round.

In the opening match of the season, TL Blue Kumuls hosted PRK Souths and the sides played out an entertaining 2–2 draw. This would prove to be a springboard for Blue Kumuls, who led the table after four rounds with seven points from three games, three ahead of PRK Souths, who had suffered a 1–0 defeat to Welgris Momads.

However, the following week, TL Blue Kumuls were pegged back after a 2–0 away defeat to Gelle Hills, while PRK Souths defeated Madang Flying Fox 2–1 to draw level on points. The two leading sides would go head-to-head on 8 October 2006, with Blue Kumuls sneaking a 1–0 away victory to put them in pole position for the Minor Premiership.

With two rounds to go, TL Blue Kumuls led the table with fourteen points, although PRK Souths, on ten, and Gelle Hills, on nine, both had a game in hand ahead of the final weekend. PRK Souths were able to edge past Welgris Momads 1–0 away, while Gelle Hills could only draw their game in hand against Madang Flying Fox, which removed them from title contention.

In a dramatic final day, PRK Souths needed to better TL Blue Kumuls' result to steal the title. In the early kick-off, the Souths enjoyed a helping hand from Gelle Hills, who beat Blue Kumuls 1–0 in a nervy encounter, and then Souths put five past Flying Fox, winning 5–1 away from home, a result which handed PRK Souths the Minor Premiership.

There was a certain level of controversy in the semi-finals of the playoffs, after the first match between Gelle Hills and TL Blue Kumuls on 18 November 2006 had to be called off due to fading light. On the following day, Gelle Hills soared to a 3–0 over Blue Kumuls, before they were pegged back by the league runners-up, with the tie eventually going to extra time. Eventually, Hills won through with a 6–5 victory after half an hour of extra time. In the second semi-final, PRK Souths went behind twice against Madang Flying Fox but eventually went through on penalties after Flying Fox missed all of their spot-kicks.

In the Grand Final, PRK Souths claimed their first title, defeating Gelle Hills 2–0.

== Regular season ==
| Pos | Team | Pld | W | D | L | GF | GA | GD | Pts | Qualification |
|---|---|---|---|---|---|---|---|---|---|---|
| 1 | PRK Souths United | 8 | 5 | 1 | 2 | 18 | 8 | +10 | 16 | Qualified for the Championship Playoff |
| 2 | TL Blue Kumuls | 8 | 4 | 2 | 2 | 10 | 8 | +2 | 14 | Qualified for the Championship Playoff |
| 3 | Gelle Hills United | 8 | 4 | 1 | 3 | 10 | 11 | −1 | 13 | Qualified for the Championship Playoff |
| 4 | Madang Flying Fox | 8 | 2 | 2 | 4 | 9 | 13 | −4 | 8 | Qualified for the Championship Playoff |
| 5 | Welgris Momads | 8 | 2 | 0 | 6 | 7 | 14 | −7 | 6 | |

Source: RSSSF
Rules for classification: 1) points; 2) goal difference; 3) number of goals scored.

== Championship playoff ==
Semi-final
1 | PRK Souths United (p) | 2(2)
4 | Madang Flying Fox | 2(0)
3 | Gelle Hills United (a.e.t.) | 6
2 | TL Blue Kumuls | 5

Grand final
1 | PRK Souths United | 2
3 | Gelle Hills United | 0
Third-place playoff
4 | Madang Flying Fox | 0
2 | TL Blue Kumuls | 4

== Continental playoff ==
As winners of the 2006 National Club Championship, University Inter were PRK Souths' opponents in the continental playoff.

9 December 2006

| PRK Souths United | 1–2 | University Inter |
|---|---|---|
| Kema Jack 29' | Report | Jonah Malus 59'; Lawrence Diau 87' |

Lloyd Robson Oval, Port Moresby
16 December 2006

| University Inter | 2–1 | Hekari United FC |
|---|---|---|
| Gari Moka 11'; Lawrence Diau 85' | Report | Jack Samani |

Lloyd Robson Oval, Port Moresby

University Inter therefore qualified for the 2007 OFC Champions League.
