= Felix Komolong =

Papua New Guinean footballer (born 1997)

Personal information
- Full name: Felix Dirik Wasi Komolong
- Date of birth: 6 March 1997 (age 29)
- Place of birth: Lae, Papua New Guinea
- Height: 1.85 m (6 ft 1 in)
- Position: Centre back

Team information
- Current team: Lae City
- Number: 4

College career
Years	Team	Apps	(Gls)
2017–2018	Northern Kentucky Norse	24	(2)

Senior career*
Years	Team	Apps	(Gls)
2012–2014	Besta United PNG		
2014–2015	Madang Fox		
2015–2016	Hekari United		
2016–2017	Canterbury United	16	(0)
2017	Madang Fox		
2019–2020	University Inter FC		
2020–2022	Lae City	10	(1)

International career^{‡}
2013	Papua New Guinea U-17	4	(0)
2014	Papua New Guinea U-20	7	(0)
2015	Papua New Guinea U-23	6	(0)
2016–	Papua New Guinea	23	(0)
Medal record
Men's football
Representing Papua New Guinea
OFC Nations Cup
Runner-up	2016 Papua New Guinea
Pacific Games
Bronze medal – third place	2015 Papua New Guinea
MSG Prime Minister's Cup
Winner	2022 Vanuatu
- * Club domestic league appearances and goals as of 10 October 2020 ‡ National team caps and goals as of 27 March 2022

Felix Komolong (born 6 March 1997) is a Papua New Guinean footballer who plays as a defender for Canterbury United of the ASB Premiership. He made his debut for the national team on March 24, 2016, in their 2–0 loss against the Solomon Islands.

== Personal ==
Komolong is of German and PNG parentage. He is the son of Birte and Miok Komolong. Some of his grandparents, cousins, and other family live in Hütten, Schleswig-Holstein. Komolong lived in Germany with his family for a year and a half beginning at age 12. He has one older and younger brother, Alwin and Kusuga.

== Career ==
In 2014, Felix had a 3-week trial with Werder Bremen. He played club football with Papua New Guinea top club Hekari United. In October 2016, Komolong signed for Canterbury United FC of the ASB Premiership. He made his league debut for the club on Matchday 1 of the season, coming on for the final 8 minutes of a 2–2 draw with Tasman United.

In July 2017, it was announced that Felix was following in his brother's footsteps and had decided to play college soccer for the Norse of Northern Kentucky University beginning with the 2017 season after graduating from King's College in 2015. In February 2020, both Komolong brothers signed for Lae City.

== Honours ==
Papua New Guinea

- OFC Nations Cup: Runner-up, 2016
- MSG Prime Minister's Cup: 2022

Papua New Guinea U-23

- Pacific Games: Bronze Medalist, 2015
