= Buang F.C. =

Association football club in Papua New Guinea

Buang
- Full name: Buang Football Club
- Manager: Raymond Nasa
- League: National Soccer League
- 2018: 7th

Buang FC, previously known for sponsorship reasons as Prima Buang FC, was a semi-professional association football club founded sometime before 2013, and based in the Mount Hagen district of Papua New Guinea.

The club took part in two editions of the Papua New Guinea National Soccer League, with their best result coming in the 2017 season when they finished 5th. In their most recent season, the 2018 edition, they finished 7th out of 7 teams.

== History ==
In August 2016, it was reported that Prima Small Goods would be sponsoring Buang FC for the fourth consecutive year. Ahead of the 2017 Papua New Guinea National Soccer League, it was revealed that Buang would be making their debut in the competition. The side were due to kick off the season in May 2017 against Southern Strikers, but their opponents didn't show up. As a result, their first match of the season was an away tie against champions Lae City Dwellers, which they lost 6–0. The side failed to register a victory until the sixth round of fixtures, when they secured a 3–2 victory against Vitis Yamaros, before adding a second victory in the penultimate week of the season against Madang FC. They would ultimately finish 5th, despite failing to complete their final match amidst reports that they, alongside two other clubs, had failed to pay the full affiliation fee for the season.

The side struggled with payments again the following season, which started similarly to the previous season with an 8–1 defeat against Lae. As the season wore on, Buang failed to register any victories and several of their scheduled fixtures did not take place and were deferred. With one week until the playoffs, the side still had four washout matches to play, a situation blamed on 'administrative failures including financial responsibilities'. On May 11 2018, it was reported that the side had failed to comply with the NSL's requirements, and that remainder of their fixtures were awarded against them, 0–3. This left them bottom of the table with twelve defeats from twelve matches.

== Domestic record ==
=== National competitions ===
- Papua New Guinea National Soccer League
  - 2017: 5th
  - 2018: 7th
