= Kusuga Komolong =

Papua New Guinean footballer

Personal information
- Full name: Kusuga Jürgen Kulakit Komolong
- Date of birth: 23 June 1998 (age 28)
- Place of birth: Lae, Papua New Guinea
- Height: 1.86 m (6 ft 1 in)
- Position: Goalkeeper

Team information
- Current team: 1. FC Lintfort II
- Number: 1

Senior career*
| Years | Team | Apps | (Gls) |
| 2016–2017 | Madang FC | | |
| 2017–2022 | University Inter | | |
| 2022–2023 | TuS Fichte Lintfort II | 10 | (1) |
| 2023– | 1. FC Lintfort II | 3 | (0) |

International career^{‡}
| 2017– | Papua New Guinea | 1 | (0) |
- * Club domestic league appearances and goals as of 10 September 2023 ‡ National team caps and goals as of 24 March 2017

Kusuga Komolong (born 23 June 1998) is a Papua New Guinean footballer who plays as a goalkeeper for 1. FC Lintfort II in Germany. He made his debut for the national team on March 23, 2017 in their 2–1 loss against Tahiti. He has two older brothers, Alwin and Felix.
