= Sepik F.C. =

Sepik
- Full name: Sepik Wewak Football Club
- Founded: 2008; 18 years ago
- League: Papua New Guinea National Soccer League

Sepik FC, sometimes referred to as East Sepik FC, was a association football club based in Wewak, Papua New Guinea, founded in 2008 shortly before the start of the 2008–09 Papua New Guinea National Soccer League season.

The side took part in just one National Soccer League season, finishing 7th out of 8 teams, before failing to return the following season. The club's finest moment perhaps came on 22 November 2008, when they defeated Rapatona FC 1–0 away from home – Rapatona would go on to finish second in the championship later that season.

== History ==
The club came into existence shortly before the start of the 2008–09 Papua New Guinea National Soccer League season, when it was reported that the franchise behind the club required screening by the NSL board, to confirm details about the club's participation in the upcoming season. In October 2008, it was confirmed that the side had paid up their affiliation fees in full and were ready to start the season.

On 2 November 2008, the club secured their first ever National Soccer League victory, defeating Rapatona FC 1–0 thanks to a goal from Terence Bandi, and a string of impressive saves from Sepik goalkeeper Ronald Warisan, a performance which eventually earned him a move to the club he had just helped to defeat. Sepik would go on to secure a double over fellow newcomers Nabasa United, defeating them 3–0 away and 3–2 at home, but couldn't find any more victories, eventually finishing 7th out of eight side in their one and only season.

Ahead of the 2009–10 season, it was reported that Sepik FC, as well as fellow strugglers Nabasa, had been replaced by Unitech FC and Gelle Hills. A bid was staged by the club's directors late-on in the application process to make a late re-entry to the league, but this was denied by the NSL board, citing that the club had given them a 'hard time last year, especially in late payment of their outstanding fees'.

The side has since gone under the radar, playing predominantly at regional and district level. As East Sepik, they entered the 2012 PNG Grassroots Games, reaching the quarter-finals. Two years later they did the same, finishing third. After their third-placed finish, there was some public interest in re-igniting the club's status in the National Soccer League, but nothing more than interest emerged. In 2021, Sepik FC would return to the Papua New Guinea National Football League.

== Domestic record ==
=== National competitions ===
- Papua New Guinea National Soccer League
  - 2008–09: 7th
