= Nabasa United F.C. =

Nabasa United
- Full name: Nabasa United Football Club
- Founded: 2008
- Chairman: John Kambuaal
- League: Papua New Guinea National Soccer League
- 2008–09: 8th

Nabasa United was a semi-professional association football club founded sometime in 2008 and based in Madang, Papua New Guinea.

The club entered the 2008–09 Papua New Guinea National Soccer League as the only Madang-based franchise, and finished bottom 8th, after winning just one game.

== History ==
This first reports of a Madang-based football club called Nabasa United came in September 2008, when a report from the OFC revealed a side with that name would be entering the 2008–09 Papua New Guinea National Soccer League, but were yet to fully pay the affiliation fee. In September, it was revealed that the major sponsor of the NSL, Telikom PNG, had demanded the inclusion of a Madang-based franchise for marketing and promotional purposes, since both Madang Fox and Besta Madang had pulled out after the previous season. In October 2008, the side's participation was confirmed.

Franchise owner John Kambuaal stated that the semi-professional NSL side would consist of players from six clubs in the Madang regional competition, and that an amateur feeder side would be set up, with a rural competition organised to find players from the smaller towns and villages of the region to stock this amateur side.

Unfortunately, the team's one and only season in the National Soccer League was not a success, picking up just one win and two draws in 14 games. Notable moments during the season included a 0–0 draw with Gigira Laitepo Morobe FC, taking a two-goal lead into half-time against reigning champions Hekari United before conceding six second-half goals to go down 6–2, an 8–0 thrashing at the hands of University Inter, and picking up their sole victory of the campaign with a 1–0 victory over Welgris Highlanders on 24 January 2009. Ahead of the 2009–10 season, it was reported that the side had been replaced in the National Soccer League for the upcoming season.

== Domestic record ==
=== National competitions ===
- Papua New Guinea National Soccer League
  - 2008–09: 8th
