= Alwin Komolong =

PNG international footballer

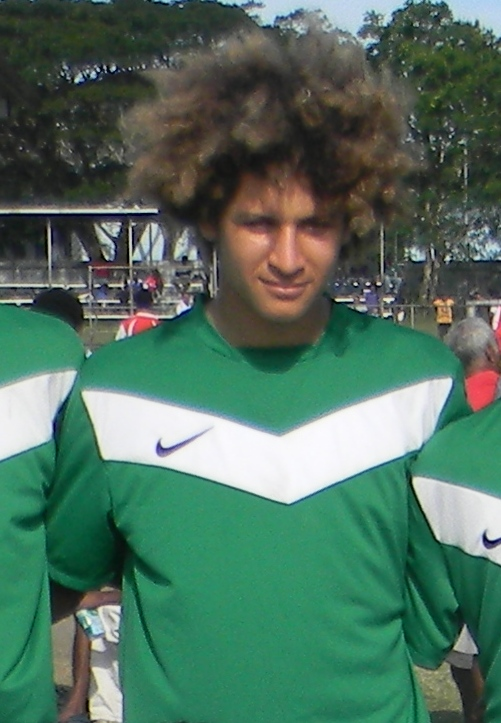
- Komolong with POMSOE FC in 2011

Personal information
- Full name: Garem Alwin Komolong
- Date of birth: 2 November 1994 (age 32)
- Place of birth: Lae, Papua New Guinea
- Height: 1.84 m (6 ft 1/2 in)
- Position: Centre back

Team information
- Current team: South Island United

Youth career
- 2009–2010: VfR Eckernförde
- 2010–2011: POMSOE FC

College career
Years	Team	Apps	(Gls)
2013	USAO Drovers	14	(2)
2014–2016	Northern Kentucky Norse	47	(1)

Senior career*
Years	Team	Apps	(Gls)
2011–2012	Besta United PNG		
2012	Waitakere City		
2013–2014	FC Port Moresby		
2014	Madang Fox		
2017–2018	Stuttgarter Kickers	12	(0)
2019	Fortuna Köln	1	(0)
2019–2020	University Inter		
2020–2023	Lae City		
2024	Queensland Lions	6	(0)
2026	South Island United	0	(0)

International career^{‡}
2011	Papua New Guinea U17	4	(2)
2011–2013	Papua New Guinea U20	6	(2)
2012–2015	Papua New Guinea U23	9	(1)
2016–	Papua New Guinea	28	(3)
Medal record
Men's football
Representing Papua New Guinea
OFC Nations Cup
Runner-up	2016 Papua New Guinea
Pacific Games
Bronze medal – third place	2015 Papua New Guinea
MSG Prime Minister's Cup
Winner	2022 Vanuatu
Winner	2024 Solomon Islands
- * Club domestic league appearances and goals as of 18 August 2024 ‡ National team caps and goals as of 18 December 2024

Alwin Komolong (born 2 November 1994) is a Papua New Guinean footballer who plays for South Island United of the OFC Professional League, and for the Papua New Guinea national football team. Alwin and his brother Felix have been called one of the strongest central defensive pairings in their region.

== Personal life ==
Komolong is of German and PNG parentage. He is the son of Birte and Miok Komolong. Dr. Komolong has served as the president of Madang FC and chairman of the PNG Football Supporters Club. Some of his grandparents, cousins, and other family live in Hütten, Schleswig-Holstein. Komolong lived in Germany with his family for a year and a half beginning at age 14. He has two younger brothers, Felix and Kusuga. Felix had a 3-week trial with Werder Bremen in 2014, and Kusuga plays as a goalkeeper.

== Youth and college ==
Komolong began playing football at age six while living in Brisbane, Australia before moving back to Papua New Guinea. At age 14, he played a year and a half for the youth sides of VfR Eckernförde of the Schleswig-Holstein Kreisliga, in his mother's home town of Eckernförde, while living with family in Germany.

After returning to Papua New Guinea, he played for two years for local development team Port Moresby School of Excellence FC of the Port Moresby Soccer Association, which was founded in 2010 and featured mostly players from the Papua New Guinea national under-17 team., from 2010 to 2011. Following his performances at the 2011 OFC U-17 Championship, he was offered a scholarship from Liston College in Auckland and finished his high school education there.

In 2013, he was invited to participate in the FIFA Blue Stars World Youth Cup by Wynton Rufer, who heard about Komolong through people who had seen him play while in Auckland and was working for the OFC at the time before becoming head coach of the Papua New Guinea national team a year later. In addition to Komolong's team composed mainly of Oceania players, Manchester United, FC Basel, Borussia Dortmund, Torino FC, Zenit St. Petersburg, Grasshopper Club Zürich, Botafogo, and hosts FC Blue Stars competed in the tournament. This edition of the tournament was the first in which a team from Oceania had entered. Upon graduation in 2013, he secured a sports scholarship for the University of Science and Arts of Oklahoma in the United States. He was also offered a scholarship from Lipscomb University in Nashville, Tennessee. His decision to attend USAO stemmed from a desire to play in Major League Soccer. He played one year of college soccer for the Drovers, making 14 appearances while tallying two goals and two assists, with his team finishing the season ranked 11th overall in the NAIA.

In 2014, Komolong transferred to NCAA Division I school Northern Kentucky University, citing his reasons for transferring as wanting a better atmosphere on and off the field. That year, he participated with NKU in a two-day tournament hosted by the Dayton Flyers. Following the tournament, Komolong was named to the All-Tournament Team. Over his first two seasons with the team, he made 34 appearances. NKU head coach John Basalyga rested Komolong after he captained the Papua New Guinea national U23 team in Olympic Qualifiers in 2015 and took a temporary break from his studies to represent his country. In his third season with the Norsemen, Komolong had 13 further appearances while scoring one goal, a game-tying tally against the IUPUI Jaguars during October of his senior year. Previously recruited as a forward by NKU, he also played as a defender and midfielder over his time with the team.

== Club career ==
While with Besta United PNG of the Papua New Guinea National Soccer League, Komolong won the league Golden Boot Award as top scorer in both 2011/12 and 2013. While attending Liston College in Auckland, Komolong played for Waitakere City FC of the NRFL, the second division of New Zealand football, in 2012. Although he was not listed as a new player prior to the start of the season, he made at least two appearances and scored at least one goal for the club. One goal came during a 1–6 defeat to Melville United, a team that featured New Zealand internationals Jesse Edge and Tyler Boyd. While with the club, he also ran youth coaching sessions before matches. He returned to Papua New Guinea for the 2013 season, signing for newly founded FC Port Moresby. The team finished league runners-up that season. In 2014, he left Port Moresby and joined Madang Fox, also of the PNG top division alongside his brother Felix. Komolong also had offers to trial with professional clubs in Malaysia.

In June 2017 it was announced that he was on trial with Stuttgarter Kickers of the German Regionalliga Südwest. He appeared in a 0–2 friendly defeat to SG Sonnenhof Großaspach and in a 1–0 victory over SGV Freiberg. On 9 July 2017 he started and played the first 60 minutes of a 1–1 preseason draw against Bundesliga club VfB Stuttgart in the Stuttgart derby. On 15 July 2017 he competed for the club in the 2017 Kaiserstuhl Cup as the club defeated Kickers Offenbach and placed second in the tournament. His official signing for the club was announced on 16 July 2017. He made his league debut for the club on 29 July 2017 in the club's opening match of the season. He started and played the full 90 minutes of the 1–0 shutout victory over Wormatia Worms. He was released from the club following the 2017/18 season which saw him appear in only twelve matches because of injury.

On 25 June 2018 it was announced that Komolong joined Czech 2. Liga club FK Pardubice on trial. By the first week of July 2018 Komolong had left Pardubice and returned to Stuttgart to find a new club. While searching for a new club, Komolong trained with the under-23 side of 2. Bundesliga club Holstein Kiel.

In January 2019 Komolong went on trial with SC Fortuna Köln of the 3. Liga who was coached by former Stuttgarter Kickers coach Tomasz Kaczmarek. His signing was officially announced by the club on 29 January 2019. After playing only two games for the club, he left at the end of the season.

While waiting for a new club in Europe, Komolong returned to Papua New Guinea and suited up for University Inter along with his brother Felix. In February 2020, both Komolong brothers signed for Lae City.

== International career ==
Komolong represented Papua New Guinea at the U17, U20, and U23 levels. Komolong was named captain of the U17 teams for the 2011 OFC U-17 Championship. He was also captain for PNG during the 2013 OFC U-20 Championship. For the U23 team, he captained the side against club teams Sarawak FA, Real Mulia F.C., and Selangor FA of the Malaysia Super League in addition to other OFC sides. In July 2015, Komolong was named a hero by the press during the 2015 Pacific Games hosted in Papua New Guinea as he scored the stoppage-time winner off a header in a 2–1 victory over Fiji to win the bronze medal. The medal was the nation's first medal for football at the Pacific Games since 1987. Papua New Guinea U23 coach and former long-time coach of the senior New Zealand national football team Ricki Herbert said of the occasion, "This is huge for men’s football. It’s not just one game, it’s the start of a new era. We can really change football here and I’m so pleased. I think it has been 30 years since the team got into a medal play-off and the boys have been awesome." The tournament also doubled as the OFC Men's Olympic Qualifying Tournament for the 2016 Summer Olympics. Komolong also served as tournament ambassador for Port Moresby 2015 and took a temporary leave from his university team and studies to represent his country. Komolong was invited to the senior team for the first time in 2015. At 19 years old he was at that time one of the youngest players ever to receive a senior call-up. In November 2015, it was announced that he was invited as part of Papua New Guinea's 29-man squad for the 2016 OFC Nations Cup, also hosted by Papua New Guinea, which also serves as qualification for the 2017 FIFA Confederations Cup and the second round of qualification for 2018 FIFA World Cup qualification. In May 2016 he was officially named to Papua New Guinea's squad for the tournament, the only foreign-based player on the roster. He made his senior international debut on 29 May, playing the full 90 minutes of a 1–1 draw with New Caledonia in Papua New Guinea's opening match of the tournament. He played in all five matches of the tournament as Papua New Guinea won their group and earned the silver medal overall for the first time ever after being defeated by New Zealand by a score of 2–4 on penalties after playing to a scoreless draw during regulation time and extra time. At the tournament, Papua New Guinea head coach Flemming Serritslev put Komolong in charge of the defense.

Only days after the Nations Cup final, Komolong was injured in a 2–0 victory in a friendly against Malaysia. He was expected to be out six weeks with a torn ligament during this time, he trained with Rapatona for rehabilitation.

In January 2017 it was announced that Komolong was part of Papua New Guinea's initial 23-man squad for two 2018 FIFA World Cup qualification matches against Tahiti in March. During the first match, the three Komolong brothers (Alwin, Felix, and Kusuga) played together in a senior international fixture for the first time.

=== International goals ===
Scores and results list Papua New Guinea's goal tally first.

No.	Date	Venue	Opponent	Score	Result	Competition
1.	27 March 2022	Grand Hamad Stadium, Doha, Qatar	Solomon Islands	1–0	2–3	2022 FIFA World Cup qualification
Last updated 27 March 2022

=== International appearances ===
As of match played 27 March 2022

International appearances
#	Date	Venue	Opponent	Result^{†}	Competition
2016
1	29 May	Sir John Guise Stadium, Port Moresby, Papua New Guinea	New Caledonia	1–1	2016 OFC Nations Cup
2	1 June	Sir John Guise Stadium, Port Moresby, Papua New Guinea	Tahiti	2–2	2016 OFC Nations Cup
3	5 June	Sir John Guise Stadium, Port Moresby, Papua New Guinea	Samoa	8–0	2016 OFC Nations Cup
4	8 June	Sir John Guise Stadium, Port Moresby, Papua New Guinea	Solomon Islands	2–1	2016 OFC Nations Cup
5	11 June	Sir John Guise Stadium, Port Moresby, Papua New Guinea	New Zealand	0–0	2016 OFC Nations Cup
6	17 June	Sir John Guise Stadium, Port Moresby, Papua New Guinea	Malaysia	2–0	Friendly
7	10 November	Shah Alam Stadium, Shah Alam, Malaysia	Iran	1–8	Friendly
8	14 November	Shah Alam Stadium, Shah Alam, Malaysia	Malaysia	1–2	Friendly
2017
9	23 March	Sir John Guise Stadium, Port Moresby, Papua New Guinea	Tahiti	1–3	2018 FIFA World Cup qualification
10	28 March	Stade Pater, Pirae, Tahiti	Tahiti	2–1	2018 FIFA World Cup qualification
11	9 June	Lawson Tama Stadium, Honiara, Solomon Islands	Solomon Islands	2–3	2018 FIFA World Cup qualification
12	13 June	PNG Football Stadium, Port Moresby, Papua New Guinea	Solomon Islands	1–2	2018 FIFA World Cup qualification
2019
13	8 July	J.S. Blatter Soccer Stadium, Apia, Samoa	Samoa	6–0	2019 Pacific Games
14	10 July	J.S. Blatter Soccer Stadium, Apia, Samoa	Vanuatu	2–0	2019 Pacific Games
15	20 July	J.S. Blatter Soccer Stadium, Apia, Samoa	Fiji	1–1 (2–4 pen.)	2019 Pacific Games
2022
16	18 March	Suheim bin Hamad Stadium, Doha, Qatar	New Zealand	0–1	2022 FIFA World Cup qualification
17	21 March	Suheim bin Hamad Stadium, Doha, Qatar	New Caledonia	1–0	2022 FIFA World Cup qualification
18	24 March	Suheim bin Hamad Stadium, Doha, Qatar	Fiji	2–1	2022 FIFA World Cup qualification
19	27 March	Grand Hamad Stadium, Doha, Qatar	Solomon Islands	0–1	2022 FIFA World Cup qualification
^{†}Papua New Guinea's goal tally first.

=== International statistics ===
As of match played 18 December 2024

Papua New Guinea
Year	Apps	Goals
2016	8	0
2017	4	0
2018	0	0
2019	3	0
2020	0	0
2021	0	0
2022	6	1
2023	0	0
2024	7	2
Total	28	3

== Honours ==
=== Player ===
F.C. Port Moresby

- Telikom NSL Cup: Runner-up, 2013

Madang Fox

- Telikom NSL Cup Runner-up, 2015

Papua New Guinea

- OFC Nations Cup: Runner-up, 2016
- MSG Prime Minister's Cup: 2022, 2024

Papua New Guinea U-23

- Pacific Games: Bronze Medalist, 2015

=== Individual ===
- Telikom NSL Cup top scorer (2): 2012, 2013
