= 2007–08 Papua New Guinea National Soccer League =

Papua New Guinea National Soccer League
- Season: 2007–08
- Dates: 10 November 2007 – 22 March 2008
- Champions: PRK Hekari United (2nd title)
- 2008–09 OFC Champions League: PRK Hekari United
- Top goalscorer: Kema Jack (15 goals)

The 2007–08 Papua New Guinea National Soccer League season, known as the Telikom NSL Cup for sponsorship purposes, was the second edition of the Papua New Guinea National Soccer League.

The title was won by PRK Hekari United, who picked up their second title. The Golden Boot was won by Hekari's Kema Jack, who scored 15 goals, while the Player of the Season award was shared by Ian Yanum of Welgris Highlanders and Ila Ilaita Jr of Gelle Hills.

== Teams ==
Seven teams entered the competition, an expansion from the previous season's five.

National Soccer League 2007–08
Team	Region	Previous Season	Other Honours
PRK Hekari United	Southern	Champions (as PRK Souths United)	2007 Port Moresby Premier League: Champions
Gelle Hills United	Southern	Runners-Up	None
Morobe Kumuls FC	Northern	3rd (as Tuguba Laitepo Blue Kumuls)	1998 National Club Championship: Runners-Up 2001, 2005 Lae Regional Championship: Champions
Madang Fox	Northern	4th (as Madang Flying Fox)	None
Welgris Highlanders	Highlands	5th (as Welgris Momads)	2005 National Club Championship: 3rd 2005 Highlands Regional Championship: Champions
Inspac Rapatona	Southern	N/A	1984, 1999 National Club Championship: Runners-Up 1989, 2004 Port Moresby Premier League: Champions
Besta Madang Fighters	Northern	N/A	None

Earlier in the year, there had been interest from further clubs, with the most notable being PS Rutz, who had competed for several years alongside Rapatona in the Port Moresby Premier League. However, their participation eventually failed to materialise.

== Format ==
In the regular season, each team played each other twice. The team at the top of the league after all matches were played was crowned 'Minor Premiers' and secured qualification for the 2008–09 OFC Champions League. At the end of the regular season, the top four teams advanced to a knockout competition, the winners of which were crowned Champions.

== Summary ==
After a successful first season, the league secured sponsorship from Telikom before the season kicked off.

With an odd number of teams, fourteen rounds of action were scheduled, with one team taking a bye each round.

The season started on 10 November 2007, and Morobe Kumuls took an early lead after an opening day 3–0 victory over Hekari United followed by a 3–0 away win against newcomers Inspac Rapatona. Champions Hekari rather stumbled out of the blocks, following up their opening defeat with a 4–4 draw against newcomers Madang Besta, and thanks to a third round bye, they found themselves joint-bottom of the table after three rounds.

Ahead of the fifth round of action, Hekari United's match against Welgris Highlanders was postponed, as the Hekari players were unable to secure flights to the venue. With Rapatona winning their fourth match from five and moving top of the league, this left Hekari 8 points behind with two games in hand; however, the sixth round of fixtures saw Hekari defeat Rapatona 1–0 to drag them back into the top four. At the half-way stage, with Hekari still to play their postponed fixture, Gelle Hills, Morobe Kumuls and Rapatona were all level at the top with 12 points, with Hekari a further two behind.

With Hekari winning their re-arranged fixture against Welgris 2–1 on 19 January 2008, the champions headed into the second half of the season on top. However, they were unable to exact revenge on Morobe Kumuls in the first round of the second half, drawing 3–3 and surrendering their lead to Rapatona, who secured a 2–0 victory over newcomers Madang Besta. However, defeat for Rapatona against Morobe Kumuls the following week, and a 6–0 win for Hekari over Madang Besta, saw them re-take the league lead ahead of their bye week. On 9 February, Gelle Hills, with their game in hand, rose to the top of the league by a single point after a 2–1 away win over Madang Besta. With Rapatona's form stuttering, the following weekend's clash between Gelle Hills and Hekari United would be crucial to deciding which way the Minor Premiership would fall.

Led by a brace from Kema Jack, Hekari secured a 3–0 away win against Hills, and that, combined with shock defeats for other title rivals Morobe Kumuls and Rapatona, saw Hekari two points clear and with a clear sight at the league title. They secured the title with one game to spare, winning all three of their remaining fixtures, while Gelle Hills held out for a 1–1 draw against Morobe Kumuls on the final day to secure second place. Rapatona earned just one point from their final five fixtures but still held on to their playoff qualifying spot in 4th.

In the playoffs, it would be Hekari against Gelle Hills in the final, as Morobe Kumuls defeated Rapatona in the third-place playoff. Hills succumbed to a sixth straight defeat to Hekari United, going down 3–2 despite a late comeback, handing Hekari their second league title.

== Regular season ==
Pos	Team	Pld	W	D	L	GF	GA	GD	Pts	Qualification
1	Hekari United (C)	12	9	2	1	32	13	+19	29	Qualified for the 2008–09 OFC Champions League Group Stage
2	Gelle Hills United	12	7	2	3	22	15	+7	23	Qualified for the Championship Playoff
3	Morobe Kumuls	12	6	3	3	24	15	+9	21	Qualified for the Championship Playoff
4	Inspac Rapatona	12	5	1	6	19	15	+4	16	Qualified for the Championship Playoff
5	Welgris Highlanders	12	4	2	6	20	19	+1	14	
6	Madang Besta	12	4	1	7	22	30	−8	13	
7	Madang Fox	12	1	1	10	18	50	−32	4	

Source: RSSSF
Rules for classification: 1) points; 2) goal difference; 3) number of goals scored.
(C) Champions

== Championship playoff ==
Semi-finals
Hekari United	3
Morobe Kumuls	1
Gelle Hills United	3
Inspac Rapatona	0

Final
Hekari United	3
Gelle Hills United	2
Third Place
Morobe Kumuls	3
Inspac Rapatona	1

=== Semi-finals ===
15 March 2008

Hekari United FC	3–1	Morobe Kumuls
Kema Jack; Andrew Lepani		Fabian Bagi

Lloyd Robson Oval, Port Moresby
15 March 2008

Gelle Hills United	3–0	Inspac Rapatona
Tau Winnie; Richard Lapan (o.g.); Ila Ilaita Jr (pen.)

Lloyd Robson Oval, Port Moresby

=== Third place ===
22 March 2008

Morobe Kumuls	3–1	Inspac Rapatona

Lloyd Robson Oval, Port Moresby

=== Final ===
22 March 2008

Hekari United FC	3–2	Gelle Hills United
Kema Jack	Report	Tau Winnie

Lloyd Robson Oval, Port Moresby
