= Ronald Warisan =

Papua New Guinean soccer player (born 1989)

Personal information
- Date of birth: 15 September 1989 (age 37)
- Place of birth: Wewak, Papua New Guinea
- Height: 1.78 m (5 ft 10 in)
- Position: Goalkeeper

Team information
- Current team: Lae City
- Number: 20

Senior career*
Years	Team	Apps	(Gls)
2008–2009	Sepik FC		
2009–2010	CMSS Rapatona Tigers		
2011–2012	Besta United PNG		
2013–2014	Gigira Laitepo Morobe FC		
2014–	Lae City		(1)

International career^{‡}
2012	Papua New Guinea U23	4	(0)
2014–	Papua New Guinea	39	(0)
Medal record
Men's football
Representing Papua New Guinea
OFC Nations Cup
Runner-up	2016 Papua New Guinea
MSG Prime Minister's Cup
Winner	2022 Vanuatu
- * Club domestic league appearances and goals ‡ National team caps and goals as of 20 August 2026

Ronald Warisan (born 15 September 1989) is a Papua New Guinean soccer player who plays as a goalkeeper for National League club Lae City and the Papua New Guinea national team.

== Club career ==
After playing for several clubs in his country, Warisan Joined Lae City Dwellers FC in 2014. During the 8th round of the 2015 National Soccer League, He scored the final goal for Lae in the 6–0 defeat of Oro FC on 11 April 2015.

== International career ==
Warisan made his senior international debut in a friendly match against Singapore on 6 September 2014.

== Career statistics ==
=== International ===
As of match played 21 December 2024

Appearances and goals by national team and year
National team	Year	Apps	Goals
Papua New Guinea	2014	1	0
Papua New Guinea	2015	–	
Papua New Guinea	2016	9	0
Papua New Guinea	2017	4	0
Papua New Guinea	2018	–	
Papua New Guinea	2019	4	0
Papua New Guinea	2020	–	
Papua New Guinea	2021	–	
Papua New Guinea	2022	8	0
Papua New Guinea	2023	4	0
Papua New Guinea	2024	9	0
Total		39	0

== Honours ==
Lae City Dwellers

- Papua New Guinea National Soccer League: 2015, 2015–16

Papua New Guinea

- OFC Nations Cup: runner-up, 2016
- MSG Prime Minister's Cup: 2022
