= Unamba =

Unamba is a surname. Notable people with the surname include:

- Don Unamba (born 1989), American football player
- Selina Unamba (born 1999), Papua New Guinean footballer
