= 2008–09 Papua New Guinea National Soccer League =

Papua New Guinea National Soccer League
- Season: 2008–09
- Dates: 8 November 2008 – 28 March 2009
- Champions: Hekari United (3rd title)
- 2009–10 OFC Champions League: Hekari United

The 2008–09 Papua New Guinea National Soccer League season, known as the Telikom NSL Cup for sponsorship reasons, was the third edition of Papua New Guinea National Soccer League.

The title was won by Hekari Souths United, who won their third consecutive title. The side were awarded the title after several postponements and the eventual cancellation of the Grand Final, by virtue of their superior regular season finish compared to Rapatona Tigers, who they were due to face in the final.

== Teams ==
Eight teams entered the competition, an expansion of one from the previous season's seven. Previous season's runners-up Gelle Hills, and bottom two clubs Madang Fox and Besta Madang Fighters, all withdrew.

Of the four new teams, only University Inter had any sort of previous history, having been founded in 1969 and having won five national titles before the induction of the National Soccer League. Eastern Stars, Sepik and Nabasa United were all newly formed teams ahead of the 2008–09 season.

Papua New Guinea National Soccer League 2008–09
Team	Region	Previous record	Other honours
Hekari Souths United	Southern	2006, 2007–08: Champions (as PRK Hekari United)	2007 Port Moresby Premier League: Champions
Gigira Laitepo Morobe	Northern	2006, 2007–08: 3rd (as Morobe Kumuls FC)	1998 National Club Championship: Runners-Up 2001, 2005 Lae Regional Championship: Champions
CMSS Rapatona Tigers	Southern	2007–08: 4th (as Inspac Rapatona)	1984, 1999 National Club Championship: Runners-Up 1989, 2004 Port Moresby Premier League: Champions
Welgris Highlanders	Highlands	2006, 2007–08: 5th	2005 National Club Championship: 3rd 2005 Highlands Regional Championship: Champions
University Inter F.C.	Southern	N/A	2007–08 OFC Champions League: Preliminary round 1995, 1996, 1997, 1998, 2006 National Club Championship: Champions 1996, 1998, 2001, 2002, 2006 Port Moresby Premier League: Champions
Eastern Stars F.C.	Southern	N/A	None
Sepik F.C.	Northern	N/A	None
Nabasa United F.C.	Northern	N/A	None

== Format ==
In the regular season, each team played each other twice. The team at the top of the league after all matches were played was crowned 'Minor Premiers' and secured qualification for the 2009–10 OFC Champions League. At the end of the regular season, the top four teams advanced to a knockout competition, the winners of which were crowned Champions.

== Summary ==
Fourteen rounds of action were scheduled, with this season being the first in the competition's history to have an even number of sides taking part and therefore no need for the usage of byes.

On the opening day of the season, on 8 November 2008, reigning champions Hekari United secured a last-gasp victory over Rapatona after a late goal from Fijian import Lorima Dau gave them a 2–1 victory, but it was Gigira Laitepo who led the league thanks to a 4–2 victory over newcomers Sepik. Thanks to heavy rain, University Inter and Eastern Stars had to wait until the following weekend for their season to kick-off.

However, it was Hekari who led the way early on, leading the league after four rounds despite having a game in hand on most of the teams directly below them thanks to a postponed fixture against University Inter, who were level on points in second place alongside Welgris and Eastern Stars, with seven, two behind Hekari. Heading into Christmas, Hekari led the table by one point from University Inter, with 15 and 14 respectively, with both sides unbeaten and Hekari with a game in hand, and the two sides' rearranged fixture still to be played.

On 17 January 2009, Hekari took a huge step towards OFC Champions League qualification with a 3–0 victory over University Inter, putting them four points clear. This gap would widen to seven after the side won their game in hand against Eastern Stars, ensuring they secured a 100% record in the first half of the season.

With Hekari and Inter clear leaders, it was the battle for playoff qualification that was the most closely fought. After the eighth round of fixtures, Welgris and Gigira Laitepo were joint third with 11 points, with Rapatona on 10 and Eastern Stars on 9. On 21 January 2009, Welgris secured a massive 2–1 victory over league leaders Hekari United, not only inflicting Hekari's only defeat of the season onto the reigning champions, but also boosting their own playoff hopes in the process. However, the following weekend, Welgris would suffer a damaging 2–1 defeat against fellow playoff chasers Gigira Laitepo, who leapfrogged them into the playoff places alongside Eastern Stars, who secured a narrow 1–0 win over struggling Nabasa. Welgris responded in style, however, securing a 4–0 victory over Eastern Stars on 14 February, returning to third place, with Rapatona now in fourth after two consecutive victories against the bottom two clubs. Fortune shifted again the following weekend as the four sides played each other, with Eastern Stars defeating Gigira Laitepo 2–1, and Rapatona securing a 2–1 victory over Welgris, putting Rapatona and Eastern Stars in the driving seat with two fixtures remaining.

Ahead of the penultimate weekend of the season, Hekari United led the league by six points from Inter, meaning they just needed one draw from their final two matches to secure a third successive OFC Champions League campaign. As it happened, Inter fell to a surprise 2–0 defeat to Welgris Highlanders, gifting Hekari the title even if they hadn't defeated Eastern Stars 3–0 that same day. Rapatona secured their playoff status with a 2–1 win over Gigira Laitepo, while Welgris' shock win meant they just needed victory over 7th-placed Sepik on the final day to join them, a result they were easily able to secure, 3–0.

In the playoffs, Hekari secured a 1–0 victory over Welgris thanks to a Michael Foster goal, while Inter suffered a surprise 2–1 defeat at the hands of Rapatona, with goals from Richard Auram and Raymond Gunemba overhauling Tau Winnie's early opener for the university-based side. However, after two postponements, the NSL board decided on 4 April 2009 that the final two games – the Grand Final and the third-Place Playoff – would be cancelled entirely, granting the title to Hekari United by default after they secured the best regular season record.

== Regular season ==
Pos	Team	Pld	W	D	L	GF	GA	GD	Pts	Qualification
1	Hekari United (C)	14	12	1	1	32	7	+25	37	Qualified for the 2009–10 OFC Champions League Group Stage
2	University Inter	14	8	4	2	31	13	+18	28	Qualified for the Championship Playoff
3	Welgris Highlanders	14	7	2	5	24	16	+8	23	Qualified for the Championship Playoff
4	Rapatona Tigers	14	7	1	6	20	19	+1	22	Qualified for the Championship Playoff
5	Eastern Stars FC	14	6	3	5	19	24	−5	21	
6	Gigira Laitepo Morobe	14	4	3	7	15	17	−2	15	
7	Sepik FC	14	3	0	11	16	34	−18	9	
8	Nabasa United	14	1	2	11	12	39	−27	5	

Source: RSSSF
Rules for classification: 1) points; 2) goal difference; 3) number of goals scored.
(C) Champions

== Championship playoff ==
Semi-finals
Hekari United	1
Welgris Highlanders	0
University Inter	1
Rapatona Tigers	2

Final
Hekari United	-
Rapatona Tigers	-
Third Place
University Inter	-
Welgris Highlanders	-

=== Semi-finals ===
14 March 2009

Hekari United	1–0	Welgris Highlanders
Michael Foster

Lloyd Robson Oval, Port Moresby
14 March 2009

University Inter	1–2	Rapatona Tigers
Tau Winnie		Richard Auram; Raymond Gunemba

Lloyd Robson Oval, Port Moresby

=== Third place ===
28 March 2009

University Inter	w/o	Welgris Highlanders

Lloyd Robson Oval, Port Moresby

=== Final ===
28 March 2009

Hekari United FC	w/o	Rapatona Tigers

Lloyd Robson Oval, Port Moresby
