= F.C. Momase =

Association football club in Port Moresby

Momase
- Full name: Football Club Momase
- League: National Soccer League
- 2018: 6th

FC Momase, formerly known as Meril Momase, was a semi-professional association football club based in Port Moresby, Papua New Guinea, founded sometime before 1984.

The side took part in one edition of the Papua New Guinea National Soccer League in 2018, finishing 6th after being suspended midway through the season. They have also won the Port Moresby Premier League once, in 2013.

== History ==
The first records of the club competing competitively are from the 1984 Papua New Guinea National Club Championship, in which they finished third in Group 1. They repeated the feat in the 1988 competition.

In 1998, the club took part in the Port Moresby Premier League, but were suspended part-way through the season. They returned the following season, but finished outside the top six. Their record between 2000 and 2002 is unknown, but they must have been relegated during this time, as they were able to earn promotion in the 2003 season before returning to the Premier League under a new name, Meril Momase, ahead of the 2004 season. The side finished seventh in the following two seasons, before finishing eighth in the 2006 season.

The side continued to take part in the Port Moresby Premier League in the National Soccer League era, with limited success. They finished eighth again in 2007 and 2008, and in 2009 were in fourth place before the Port Moresby Soccer Association was suspended by the Papua New Guinea Football Association. They continued this good form into the 2011 season, however, and finished third.

The 2013 Port Moresby Premier League was hugely successful for the club, with the side finishing the season as Minor Premiers by having the best regular season record and then going on to defeat Maclaren FC 3–0 in the Grand Final to win their first ever regional title.

The side were one of seven teams registered ahead of the 2018 Papua New Guinea National Soccer League, the side's first foray into national semi-professional competition. The side had a modest season, securing one win, a 3–1 victory against Southern Strikers in February 2018, and two draws, but were eventually suspended from the competition on 3 May after failing to pay their full affiliation fee, with their remaining fixtures awarded against them, 0–3.

== Honours ==
=== Regional Competitions ===
- Port Moresby Premier League
  - Champions: 2013
  - Third place: 2011
