= Besta Madang Fighters =

Defunct association football club

- Full name: Besta Madang Fighters Football Club
- Founded: 2007
- Ground: Lawaiden Oval; Madang, Papua New Guinea
- League: Papua New Guinea National Soccer League
- 2007–08: 6th

Besta Madang Fighters was a short-lived Papua New Guinea semi-professional association football club founded in 2007, based in Madang.

The club was founded as a new franchise ahead of the 2007–08 Papua New Guinea National Soccer League season, consisting predominantly from the local-level areas of the Madang province. The club finished 6th out of 7 sides that season, and failed to return the following season.

== History ==
The club was founded shortly before the 2007–08 National Soccer League, and was the second Madang-based franchise to enter the competition after Madang FC's debut the previous season. The franchise was created to allow players from local-level government areas of the Madang province to get a taste of semi-professional football.

They entered as one of two debuting teams, with the second being Rapatona FC, who had competed for years in the Port Moresby Premier League. Rapatona's experience was no match for the newcomers in the opening match of the season, and the Fighters went down 3–0. In their second game, they managed to hold champions Hekari United to a thrilling 4–4 draw. However, they would not win a league game until the fifth round of fixtures, when they defeated fellow Madang side Madang FC 3–2 thanks to a hat-trick from Niel Hans. The side then endured a run of four consecutive defeats, including a 6–0 thrashing in the return fixture against Hekari, but would win their second game against title-chasing Morobe FC on 16 February 2008, unexpectedly winning 4–0 to shake up the title race. They would win twice more, completing the double over Madang FC with a 6–5 win later in February, before a 3–1 victory over Welgris Highlanders on the final day of the season. The side finished 6th in the table.

In October 2008, it was reported that both Madang-based teams had been kicked out of the National Soccer League, with "poor performance and lack of support, financial and otherwise" being the reasons cited. This would be the first and last season the side were seen in competitive action.

== Domestic record ==
- Papua New Guinea National Soccer League
  - 2007–08: 6th
