= Sobou F.C. =

Sobou
- Full name: Sobou Football Club
- Short name: SFC
- Founded: 1980s
- Ground: Sir Ignatius Kilage Stadium
- Capacity: 1,500
- League: National Club Championship

Sobou Football Club, previously known for sponsorship reasons as Cellnet Sobou and Telikom Sobou, is an association football club based in Lae, Papua New Guinea. The club appears to have been in existence since the 1980s.

The club is domestically one of the most successful in Papua New Guinean football history, having won five National Club Championship titles consecutively, from 2001 to 2005, a domestic record they share with University. The club also took part in two editions of the OFC Champions League, but were unable to register any points. Since the introduction of the National Soccer League in 2006, the club has taken part predominantly in the regional competitions.

== History ==
=== Early years ===
Not much is known about the foundation of the club, but the first records of their competitive history come from 1985, when the club were declared runners-up of the Lae Regional League. Sometime in the early 1990s, the club joined the new Lahi Regional League, and went on to win the competition three times consecutively in 1994, 1995 and 1996.

Further records begin in 1997, when the club took part in the Papua New Guinea National Club Championship, the biggest domestic competition in the country at that time. The club did not finish in the top four. In 1998, the club won their fourth regional title, defeating Guria Lahi 4–2 in the Grand Final. This ought to have qualified them for the 1999 National Club Championship, but they did not take part. They did, however, pick up a fifth regional title, defeating Guria Lahi on penalties in that year's Grand Final.

In 2000, the club took part in their second National Club Championship, finishing fourth. A further regional title followed later in the year, before the club began to fully dominate domestically for much of the early 2000s.

=== National dominance and continental qualification ===
Despite coming second regionally, they picked up their first National Club Championship on 11 November 2001, defeating four-time champions University 3–0 in the Grand Final. The following year they completed a national and domestic double, defeating PS United in the National Club Championship and Unitech in the regional final.

In 2003, the team faced Unitech in both the national and regional finals: on 16 September 2003, the side defeated Unitech 1–0 to claim the national title for the third successive season; just over a month later, they were on the wrong end of a 2–0 defeat to surrender the regional title to their rivals. In 2004, they repeated their feat from 2002, picking up the national title over HC West and the regional title against Bismarck FC.

Their 2004 victory qualified them for the 2005 OFC Club Championship, a competition that would eventually become the OFC Champions League. After defeating Samoan side Tuinaimato Breeze 7–0 on aggregate in the preliminary round, the club went on to lose all three games in the group stage, conceding 20 goals and scoring just four. Their final national title came in 2005, with a 4–2 victory over Cosmos, while regional they finished as runners-up once again.

The club's performance in the 2006 OFC Club Championship wasn't much better than their previous attempt. The club qualified for the competition directly, but lost all three of their group games, scoring once and conceding 21 goals. Domestically, the side came second regionally while reaching the 2006 National Club Championship final, where they faced four-time champions University, whose record they had surpassed the previous season after winning their fifth title. On 9 July 2006, University equalled Sobou's new record with a victory on penalties after a 0–0 draw in normal time.

=== Decline and return to regional competition ===
In 2007, the club took part in one of the regional competitions intended to be a feeder for the 2007 National Club Championship. Although the national competition didn't materialise, the Momase regional did take place, but Sobou were unable to make an impact on the competition. They did, however, clinch their ninth regional title with a 2–1 victory over Sogeram on 27 October 2007. In 2008, Sobou won the Momase Regional Championship and qualified for the National Club Championship, but did not reach the final. They finished second in the Lahi Regional League that year.

Following the suspension of the Lahi FA in 2009, the club's records go dark until 2018, when the club reached the final of the Lahi Regional League before losing on penalties to Consort United. In 2019, the club took part in the relaunched Momase Regional Championship, bidding to become the region's representative at the renewed National Club Championship.

== Honours ==
=== Continental competitions ===
- OFC Champions League
  - Group Stage: 2005, 2006

=== National competitions ===
- Papua New Guinea National Club Championship
  - Champions: 2001, 2002, 2003, 2004, 2005
  - Runners-up: 2006
  - Fourth: 2000

=== Regional competitions ===
- Momase Regional Championship
  - Champions: 2008
- Lahi Regional League
  - Champions: 1994, 1995, 1996, 1998, 1999, 2000, 2002, 2004, 2007
  - Runners-up: 2001, 2003, 2005, 2006, 2008, 2018
- Lae Regional League
  - Runners-up: 1985
