= Yamaros F.C. =

Association football club in Port Moresby

Yamaros
- Full name: Yamaros Football Club
- League: National Soccer League
- 2017: 6th

Yamaros FC, formerly known as Vats Yamaros or Vitis Yamaros for sponsorship reasons, was a semi-professional association football club based in Gerehu, Port Moresby, Papua New Guinea, founded around 2010.

The club took part in one edition of the Papua New Guinea National Soccer League, finishing 6th out of 6 in the 2017 edition of the competition. The club has also taken part in several editions of the Port Moresby Premier Division, having won the title in 2011.

== History ==
The club was founded sometime before their first competitive outing in the Port Moresby Premier Division in 2010, in which they finished runners-up to University after a 2–0 defeat in the Grand Final. The following season, they went a step further, defeating the Port Moresby School of Excellence (POMSOE) team 4–3 on penalties after a 0–0 draw, with fullback Tony Pepea scoring the winning penalty.

In the 2012 edition of the competition, the club picked up the league's Minor Premiership by finishing the regular season at the top of the table, before reaching their third successive Grand Final with a 1–0 victory over PS Rutz in the semi-final. However, the side failed to defend their title, going down 1–0 in the final against University.

In December 2012, it was reported that the side had expressed an interest in taking part in the 2013 Papua New Guinea National Soccer League, but had failed to pay the application fee. In the end, their participation failed to materialise.

They did, however, enter the 2013 Port Moresby Premier Division, losing their opening match 4–0 against Defence on the first weekend of June before stabilising somewhat in an evenly-matched season with no runaway leader: by July, the side were level with four other teams in second place on nine points, by August they were top, but they had surrendered that lead and fallen to third by the end of the following weekend. They finished the regular season in second place behind FC Momase, before eventually losing to MacLaren FC in the playoffs, finishing third overall.

Details of the club's competitive history after 2013 are unclear, until they were confirmed in February 2017 as taking part in the 2017 Papua New Guinea National Soccer League for the first time. They opened their campaign with a solid 1–1 draw against league veterans Besta PNG United, but that would prove to be their only point of the campaign, as they lost or forfeited the remainder of their matches. They were not registered ahead of the 2018 season.

== Honours ==
=== Regional competitions ===
- Port Moresby Premier League
  - Champions: 2011
  - Runners-up: 2010, 2012
  - Third place: 2013
