= 2017 Papua New Guinea National Soccer League =

Papua New Guinea National Soccer League
- Season: 2017
- Dates: 6 May 2017 – 19 August 2017
- Champions: Lae City Dwellers (3rd title)
- 2018 OFC Champions League: Lae City Dwellers; Madang FC

The 2017 Papua New Guinea National Soccer League season was the 11th edition of the Papua New Guinea National Soccer League.

The title was won by Lae City Dwellers, who were awarded the title by virtue of their superior regular season record, after the Papua New Guinea Football Association cancelled the playoffs and the Grand Final.

== Teams ==
The season was the first after the league split, which saw 11 out of the 18 regional football associations break away from the league and form their own association. As such, membership of the league shrank from 12 to 6 teams, with only four – champions Lae City Dwellers, Madang FC, Besta PNG United and PS Huawei – returning from the previous season, alongside two debutants, Buang FC and Vitis Yamaros, who replaced Southern Strikers, who were due to take part but withdrew shortly after they failed to turn up for their opening fixture.

Papua New Guinea National Soccer League 2017
Team	Previous best	Other honours
Lae City Dwellers	2015, 2015–16: Champions	None
Madang F.C.	2015: Runners-Up	None
Besta PNG United	2011–12, 2013: Third	None
PS Huawei	2015–16: Southern Conference: 6th	2002 National Club Championship: Runners-Up 2000, 2005 Port Moresby Premier League: Champions
Vitis Yamaros	N/A	2011 Port Moresby Premier League: Champions
Buang F.C.	N/A	None

== Format ==
Reverting to the structure employed from 2006 to 2014, six teams played in the league, and during the regular season, teams played home and away, and the team at the top of the league after all matches were played was crowned 'Minor Premiers'. The top two secured qualification for the 2018 OFC Champions League. At the end of the regular season, the top four teams advanced to a knockout competition, the winners of which were crowned Champions.

== Summary ==
The season was deferred several times thanks to the difficulties involving the league split, initially from February to 29 April 2017 to allow for Lae City Dwellers' and Madang FC's participation in the 2017 OFC Champions League and for the national team's FIFA World Cup qualification campaign. This was further pushed back into May due to funding issues, and finally kicked off on 6 May 2017.

On the opening day, Southern Strikers failed to show up and eventually withdrew from the competition, eventually being replaced by Vitis Yamaros. Lae City Dwellers and Madang FC played out a 1–1 draw, which allowed PS Huawei to take an early lead at the top of the table with a 2–1 win over Besta PNG United. Huawei held this lead through the second week with a 1–0 win over Madang, before dropping to second on goal difference behind Lae City after a 1–1 draw with Buang FC.

Lae would go on to win all their remaining matches and concede just eight goals, but they didn't go clear at the top until matchday five, when they defeated PS Huawei 4–1, in part thanks to a brace from Raymond Gunemba. This defeat was a catalyst for PS Huawei, who lost their next two matches against Besta PNG United and Madang FC, allowing the latter to overtake them into second. The race for second would not be resolved until the final day, with both Madang and Huawei going into their final fixtures on 16 points. Huawei lost narrowly 2–3 against Minor Premiers Lae City Dwellers while Magang secured a 2–1 win against Vitis Yamaros to secure second place and a spot at the 2018 OFC Champions League.

At the bottom, Buang FC and Vitis Yamaros were due to play their final game – which would have been played on the opening day – on 22 July 2017, a week after the final regular season matches, but a week before the playoffs. However, both teams forfeited, and were each awarded a 0–3 defeat against them.

In the playoffs, Lae City Dwellers reached the final after a 2–1 victory over Besta PNG United, but the match between Madang FC and PS Huawei was deferred several times before Huawei eventually withdrew, citing poor management of the competition. The final was cancelled shortly afterwards, with the PNGFA blaming 'the rainy season in Lae, the national elections and the failure of some clubs to pay their fees in full'. Lae City Dwellers were awarded the title by virtue of their superior regular season record.

== Regular season ==
Pos	Team	Pld	W	D	L	GF	GA	GD	Pts	Qualification
1	Lae City Dwellers	10	9	1	0	40	8	+32	28	Qualified for the 2018 OFC Champions League Group Stage and Playoffs
2	Madang FC	10	6	1	3	17	10	+7	19	Qualified for the 2018 OFC Champions League Group Stage and Playoffs
3	PS Huawei	10	5	1	4	19	13	+6	16	Qualified for the Playoffs
4	Besta PNG United	10	3	2	5	17	20	−3	11	Qualified for the Playoffs
5	Buang FC	9	2	2	5	9	31	−22	8 (Note: The match between Buang FC and Vitis Yamaros was deemed a double forfeiture.)	
6	Vitis Yamaros	9	0	1	8	12	32	−20	1	

Source: rsssf.com
Rules for classification: 1) points; 2) goal difference; 3) number of goals scored.

== Playoffs ==
Semi-finals
Lae City Dwellers (a.e.t.)	2
Besta PNG United	1
Madang FC	-
PS Huawei	-

Final
Lae City Dwellers	-
Madang FC	-

The NSL cancelled the final following the withdrawal of PS United, due to clubs failing to have paid fees in full.

=== Semi-finals ===
29 July 2017

Lae City Dwellers	2–1	Besta PNG United

Sir Ignatius Kilage Stadium, Lae
16 August 2017

Madang FC	w/o	PS Huawei

Laiwaden Oval, Madang

=== Final ===
19 August 2017

Lae City Dwellers	w/o	Madang FC

Sir Ignatius Kilage Stadium, Lae
