= 2018 Papua New Guinea National Soccer League =

Papua New Guinea National Soccer League
- Season: 2018
- Dates: 13 January 2018 – 26 May 2018
- Champions: Toti City FC (4th title)
- 2019 OFC Champions League: Toti City FC; Morobe Wawens

The 2018 Papua New Guinea National Soccer League was the 12th edition of Papua New Guinea National Soccer League. The league ran from 13 January to 26 May 2018.

The title was won by Toti City, formerly Lae City Dwellers, who picked up their fourth title with a 3–0 victory over Besta PNG United in the Grand Final. Toti, alongside FC Morobe Wawens, qualified for the 2019 OFC Champions League by virtue of their final league position.

== Teams ==
The season was the second and final following the league split, with the league expanding to seven teams from six the previous season. Reigning champions Lae City Dwellers returned under a new name – Toti City FC – while Besta PNG United, Madang FC and Buang FC also returned. Southern Strikers, who had initially planned to take part in the 2017 season, were the first team confirmed as competing, while there were debuts for FC Morobe Wawens and FC Momase.

Papua New Guinea National Soccer League 2018
| Team | Previous best | Other honours |
|---|---|---|
| Toti City F.C. | 2015, 2015–16, 2017: Champions | None |
| Madang F.C. | 2015, 2017: Runners-Up | None |
| Besta PNG United | 2011–12, 2013, 2017: Third | None |
| Buang F.C. | 2017: 5th | None |
| F.C. Momase | N/A | 2013 Port Moresby Premier League: Champions |
| Southern Strikers | N/A | None |
| F.C. Morobe Wawens | N/A | None |

== Format ==
Seven teams played in the league during the regular season, and teams played home and away, with the team at the top of the league after all matches were played crowned as 'Minor Premiers'. The top two secured qualification for the 2018 OFC Champions League. At the end of the regular season, the top four teams advanced to a knockout competition, the winners of which were crowned Champions.

== Summary ==
In early January, shortly after the season began, the PNGFA were banned from using all PNG Sports Foundation facilities due to outstanding payments from the 2016 FIFA U-20 Women's World Cup, which took place in the country.

Reigning champions Toti City made a strong start to the season, picking up big wins in their second and third fixtures, defeating Buang FC 8–1 and Madang FC 7–2 on back-to-back weekends to go clear at the top after just three weeks. It was a position they would not relinquish for the remainder of the season, eventually going unbeaten, dropping points in the second half of the season with draws against Madang and Southern Strikers.

The battle for second place, and with it the second OFC Champions League spot, was far closer. Initially, it looked like Madang would be Toti's closest rivals, as they sat four points ahead of third-placed Morobe Wawens in mid-March. However, a 2–0 defeat on 17 March to Besta PNG United and a defeat by the same scoreline to Wawens on the final official matchday 21 April saw them slip to fourth, while Wawens' victory propelled them into the second spot.

On May 3, after the end of the officially scheduled fixtures, it was decided that all the remaining matches were to be forfeited, as only the top four sides had paid their affiliation fee in full. However, by the following week, Southern Strikers settled their fee, and their remaining matches were rescheduled, while Buang and Momase had 0–3 defeats awarded against them in all their outstanding fixtures. Southern Strikers eventually finished fifth, outside the qualification to the playoffs, and their rearranged matches had no effect on the final standings.

In the playoffs, Toti City reached their fourth consecutive Grand Final with a penalty shoot-out victory over Madang in the first semi-final, while third-placed Besta PNG United defeated second-placed Wawens. In the final Toti City claimed their fourth title with a 3–0 victory over Besta PNG.

== Regular season ==
| Pos | Team | Pld | W | D | L | GF | GA | GD | Pts | Qualification or relegation |
|---|---|---|---|---|---|---|---|---|---|---|
| 1 | Toti City | 12 | 10 | 2 | 0 | 46 | 15 | +31 | 32 | Qualification to 2019 OFC Champions League and Playoffs |
| 2 | Morobe Wawens | 12 | 8 | 0 | 4 | 36 | 18 | +18 | 24 | Qualification to 2019 OFC Champions League and Playoffs |
| 3 | Besta PNG United | 12 | 7 | 1 | 4 | 25 | 14 | +11 | 22 | Qualification to Playoffs |
| 4 | Madang FC | 12 | 6 | 2 | 4 | 29 | 21 | +8 | 20 | Qualification to Playoffs |
| 5 | Southern Strikers | 12 | 3 | 3 | 6 | 17 | 29 | −12 | 12 | |
| 6 | FC Momase | 12 | 1 | 2 | 9 | 11 | 33 | −22 | 5 (Note: Both matches between Momase and Buang not played and were forfeited by both clubs (0–3).) | |
| 7 | Buang FC | 12 | 0 | 0 | 12 | 5 | 51 | −46 | 0 | |

Source: FIFA

== Playoffs ==
All matches at Sir Ignatius Kilage Stadium, Lae.

Semi-finals
20 May
Toti City (a.e.t.) (p) | 2 (5)
Madang FC | 2 (4)
20 May
Morobe Wawens | 0
Besta PNG United | 1

Final
26 May
Toti City | 3
Besta PNG United | 0
Third place
26 May
Madang FC | 0
Morobe Wawens | 2

=== Semi-finals ===
20 May 2018

| Toti City | 2–2 (a.e.t.) | Madang FC |
|---|---|---|
| Goal | | Goal |
Penalties
| | 5–4 |

Sir Ignatius Kilage Stadium, Lae
20 May 2018

| Morobe Wawens | 0–1 | Besta PNG United |
|---|---|---|
| | | Goal |

Sir Ignatius Kilage Stadium, Lae

=== Final ===
27 May 2018

| Toti City | 3–0 | Besta PNG United |
|---|---|---|
| Dabinyaba 10'; David 47'; Gunemba |

Sir Ignatius Kilage Stadium, Lae
