= Gelle Hills United =

- Full name: Gelle Hills United Football Club
- Founded: 2006
- Dissolved: 2010
- Ground: Telikom Park; Port Moresby, Papua New Guinea
- Chairman: Wilfred Vali
- League: Papua New Guinea National Soccer League
- 2009–10: 7th

Gelle Hills United was a semi-professional Papua New Guinea soccer club founded in 2006, based in Central Province but playing their home games predominantly in Port Moresby.

The club was one of the founding members of the Papua New Guinea National Soccer League, finishing as runners-up in the opening two seasons of the competition. These remain their most successful seasons to date, having disappeared in 2010.

== History ==
Despite what their logo suggests, Gelle Hills was founded in 2006, before the inaugural Papua New Guinea National Soccer League season began. The club was one of five founding members, and they finished the regular season in third place in the league table. They progressed to the playoffs, where, on 18 November 2006, they were set to play Morobe FC in the semi-final. However, fading light stopped play at 0–0, and a replay was scheduled the following day. After surrendering a 3–0 lead, the match went to extra time, and the Hills pipped Morobe 6–5 to reach the very first Grand Final. Once there, they fell to Hekari United, losing 2–0, but picking up a prize of K25,000 for finishing second.

They returned for the 2007–08 season and once again performed well, finishing second in the regular season table, behind champions Hekari. After a 3–0 victory over Rapatona in the playoff semi-final, the team once again faced Hekari United in the Grand Final, and were the bridesmaids again, losing 3–2 despite a brace from Tau Winnie. In September 2008 it was reported that the club had been thrown out of the 2008–09 season as the side had failed to meet the statutory requirements necessary to maintain their status in the division. However, chairman Wilfred Vali had indicated that he had successfully negotiated the financial backing of Rob Jones, part-owner of the Australian side Brisbane Roar FC, and as part of the agreement Hills would secure the services of three Australian players for the forthcoming season. Nevertheless, Gelle Hills did not compete in the 2008–09 season.

They would, however, return for the 2009–10 season as one of nine teams. Despite a promising start, with three wins from their opening four matches, the side were unable to make an impact upon their return, and finished 7th in the table. On 7 July 2010, Papua New Guinean newspaper The National suggested that Gelle Hills might be 'exempted' from the upcoming season's competition. Indeed, on 30 October 2010, the 2010–11 season kicked off with Gelle Hills not one of the seven teams taking part.

== Honours ==
=== National competitions ===
- Papua New Guinea National Soccer League
  - Runners-up: 2006, 2007–08
