= Rachel Wadunah =

Papua New Guinean footballer

Rachel Wadunah is a Papua New Guinean football manager.

== Career ==
Wadunah worked as assistant manager for the Papua New Guinea women's national football team for the 2015 Pacific Games and the 2016 FIFA U-20 Women's World Cup. After that, she was appointed manager of the Papua New Guinea women's national football team. She has been described as having "a pivotal role in women’s football in Papua New Guinea" and "a large role in youth football development covering both boys and girls".

== Personal life ==
Wadunah has worked as a teacher. She is the mother of Papua New Guinean footballers Ricky Wadunah and Jason Wadunah.
