= Faith Kasiray =

Papua New Guinean footballer

Personal information
- Date of birth: 20 December 1999 (age 26)
- Height: 1.66 m (5 ft 5 in)
- Position: Goalkeeper

Team information
- Current team: Hekari United

Senior career*
Years	Team	Apps	(Gls)
- Hekari United

International career^{‡}
2019–	Papua New Guinea	1	(0)
- * Club domestic league appearances and goals ‡ National team caps and goals as of 18 July 2019

Faith Kasiray (born 20 December 1999) is a Papua New Guinean footballer who plays as a goalkeeper for Hekari United and the Papua New Guinea women's national team.

Kasiray hails from Madang Province and was inspired to play football by her brothers.
