= Selina Unamba =

Papua New Guinean footballer

Personal information
- Date of birth: 24 November 1999 (age 26)
- Position: Forward

Team information
- Current team: Lae

Senior career*
Years	Team	Apps	(Gls)
- Lae

International career^{‡}
2019–	Papua New Guinea	3	(2)
- * Club domestic league appearances and goals ‡ National team caps and goals as of 18 July 2019

Selina Unamba (born 24 November 1999) is a Papua New Guinean footballer who plays as a forward for Lae FC and the Papua New Guinea women's national team.

Unamba is from Huon Gulf in Morobe Province and was educated at Goroka Grammar School. She started playing football in 2010. She was selected for the Papua New Guinea women's national under-20 football team for the 2016 Olympic qualifiers. She was part of the national team which won gold at the 2019 Pacific Games in Apia.
