= Welgris Highlanders F.C. =

Welgris Highlanders
- Full name: Welgris Highlanders Football Club
- Founded: 2001
- Ground: NSI Oval; Goroka, Papua New Guinea
- Capacity: 5,000
- League: Papua New Guinea National Soccer League
- 2013: 8th

Welgris Highlanders, formerly known as Welgris Momads, was a semi-professional Papua New Guinean soccer club based in Mount Hagen, but playing their home games in Goroka.

They were one of five founding members of the Papua New Guinea National Soccer League, but reached the knockout stages just once in four years of competing. After a three-year hiatus, the side played their final NSL season in 2012–13, where they finished bottom of the league.

== History ==
=== Foundation and early years ===
The club was founded as Welgris Momads sometime at the start of the 21st century, as their first season on record came in 2001 when they took part in the Mount Hagen Regional League. Among seven participants, they were the eventual champions. Two years later, they competed in both the Highlands Regional Championship and the Papua New Guinea National Club Championship, but failed to make an impact on either competition.

In 2005, the side took part in both the Highlands Regional Championship and the National Club Championship for the second time. The club fared much better in both competitions, winning the Highlands competition with a 3–1 victory over Blue Kumuls Mount Hagen in the final on 22 August, before meeting Blue Kumuls again in the third-place playoff of the National Club Championship, this time winning 3–0.

=== National Soccer League debut ===
From 18–21 May 2006, the side took part in the Highlands Regional Championship, reaching the final. Despite defeating eventual NSL champions Hekari United 1–0 early in the season, they picked up just two wins from eight matches and finished bottom of the table, being the only side to fail to make the playoffs. The following season, the side changed their name to Welgris Highlanders. Among seven teams they finished 5th, missing out on playoff qualification by two points. The side did, however, win the Fair Play Award. The 2007 Highlands Regional Championship was delayed to March 2008, with the final, once again against Blue Kumuls Mount Hagen, due to be completed on 30 March 2008. However, the final wasn't played after appeal regarding the eligibility of National Soccer League players participating in the tournament.

They entered the eight-team 2008–09 season and finished third in the league table, qualifying for the playoffs for what would prove to be the first and last time. The side came up against champions Hekari in the semi-final, losing 1–0, before preparing to head to the Lloyd Robson Oval on 21 March 2009 for the third-place match against University Inter. However, after two postponements, the NSL board cancelled both the third-place match and the final. Ahead of the 2009–10 season, it was reported that the side had merged with Rapatona, and for three years the Welgris Highlanders name would not be seen in domestic competition. On 14 April 2010, it was reported that the club was defunct.

=== NSL return and disappearance ===
Towards the end of 2012, it was reported that the side was making a return to the National Soccer League, ahead of the 2013 season. They won just one match from 14 and finished bottom of the table. In October 2013, the side revealed they would be withdrawing from the upcoming 2014 season, citing costs and change in the competition format as primary reasons.

== Honours ==
=== National competitions ===
- Papua New Guinea National Club Championship
  - Third place: 2005

=== Regional competitions ===
- Highlands Regional Championship
  - Champions: 2005
