= PS Rutz =

Association football club

- 2017 logo
- Full name: PS Rutz Football Club
- Founded: 1992
- League: Papua New Guinea National Soccer League
- 2017: 4th

PS Rutz, formerly PS United and PS Huawei United, was a semi-professional soccer club founded in 1992 and based in Port Moresby, Papua New Guinea.

The side were runners-up in the Papua New Guinea National Club Championship in 2002, a feat which is still their best achievement. They have also won the Port Moresby Premier Division on three occasions, in 2000, 2005 and 2019. From 2015 to 2017, the side competed in two editions of the Papua New Guinea National Soccer League. Their best result came in 2017, finishing fourth after withdrawing from the playoffs.

== History ==
=== Foundation and early years ===
The club was founded in 1992 as PS United, but records of their competitive history do not begin until 1998, when they took part in the Port Moresby Premier League, a regional competition for clubs based in the country's capital. After finishing 5th in the league table, they went on to claim fourth place overall via the playoffs.

The following season, they finished second both in the regular season table and in the playoffs, losing in the Grand Final to Defence, who had only finished 6th in the league table, on penalties. As a result, they qualified for the 2000 National Club Championship, but failed to get out of their group. However, on 22 October 2000, they claimed their first Port Moresby Premier League title after winning 1–0 against Rapatona, despite only finishing 6th in the regular season standings. For unknown reasons, however, the side did not take part in the 2001 National Club Championship.

=== National runners-up ===
The side reached their third successive regional final in 2001, after finishing second in the league to ANZ University, who narrowly defeated them 1–0 in the decisive match. This allowed them qualification to the 2002 National Club Championship, where they topped their group and defeated Newtown in the semi-finals, before facing Sobou and losing 1–0. Later that season, the side completed a disappointing regional campaign by finishing 5th in the Port Moresby Premier League. They would repeat that feat the following year.

Ahead of the 2004 season, the side were re-named as PS Rutz, and finished runners-up in the 2004 Port Moresby Premier League despite finishing top of the regular season table. They qualified for the 2005 National Club Championship as a result, but failed to get out of their group. That season, they finished second in the Port Moresby Premier League regular season table and beat University and Hekari United to the title after defeating both sides en route to a 2–0 Grand Final win against the former in the final.

The side finished 4th in the 2006 National Club Championship after losing to Blue Kumuls Lae in the third-place playoff, before finishing fifth in that season's edition of the Port Moresby Premier League. The club slowly began to decline, with a third place finish in 2012 the highlight of the next few years, before the side entered the Papua New Guinea National Soccer League for the 2015–16 season.

=== National Soccer League ===
The side entered the 2015–16 Papua New Guinea National Soccer League under new sponsorship from Huawei, thus changing their name to PS Huawei. The club were drawn into the Southern Conference, but had a poor season, finishing bottom of the regional pool despite an opening day 3–2 victory over former runners-up FC Port Moresby. The side won just one more game across the season and lost six, including conceding six to both Port Moresby and Hekari United.

The side remained in the National Soccer League after the domestic league split and finished third in the regular season table. However, they eventually pulled out of the playoffs, citing 'poor management of the competition.' This led to the complete cancellation of the playoffs that season.

=== Return to regional competition ===
After dropping out of the National Soccer League and retaining their previous name PS Rutz, the team took part in the 2017 Port Moresby Premier Division, finishing outside the top five and failing to qualify for the playoffs. The following season, they likely finished 5th. In the 2019 season, they picked up third regional championship, after topping the table ahead of University Inter.

== Honours ==
=== National competitions ===
- Papua New Guinea National Club Championship
  - Runners-up: 2002

=== Regional competitions ===
- Port Moresby Premier League
  - Champions: 2000, 2005, 2019
  - Runners-up: 1999, 2001, 2004
  - Third place: 2012
