= Margret Joseph =

Papua New Guinean footballer

Personal information
- Date of birth: 4 January 1999 (age 27)
- Height: 1.65 m (5 ft 5 in)
- Position: Midfielder

Team information
- Current team: POM

Senior career*
Years	Team	Apps	(Gls)
- POM

International career^{‡}
2019–	Papua New Guinea	4	(0)
- * Club domestic league appearances and goals ‡ National team caps and goals as of 18 July 2019

Margret Joseph or Margaret Joseph (born 4 January 1999) is a Papua New Guinean footballer who plays as a midfielder for POM FC and the Papua New Guinea women's national team.

She was captain of the under-20 women's team for the 2016 women's world cup qualifiers. She had previously captained the under-15 team at the 2014 youth olympics.

In 2020 she played for PNG club Genesis. She was part of the national team which won gold at the 2019 Pacific Games in Apia. In 2022 she was part of the team which won the 2022 OFC Women's Nations Cup.
