= Kema Jack =

Papua New Guinean footballer

Kema Jack (born 10 January 1982) is an international footballer for Papua New Guinea. He played in the 2012 OFC Nations Cup.
