= Rapatona F.C. =

Rapatona
- Full name: Rapatona Football Club
- Nickname: The Raps
- Founded: 1982
- Ground: Bisini Park; Port Moresby, Papua New Guinea
- Capacity: 5,000
- League: Papua New Guinea National Premier League
- 2017: Southern Conference: 6th
Home colours

Rapatona Football Club, formerly known as Inspac Rapatona, CMSS Rapatona Tigers, Moresby Casino Hotel and PKA Rapatona for sponsorship reasons, was a Papua New Guinean soccer club based in Port Moresby and founded in 1982.

The club last competed in the Papua New Guinea National Soccer League, joining in 2007–08, reaching the Grand Final in the 2008–09 season. They also finished second in the Papua New Guinea National Club Championship on two occasions, as well as winning the regional Port Moresby Premier League twice, in 1989 and 2004. The club took part in the 2017 Papua New Guinea National Premier League, having broken away from the Papua New Guinea Football Association in late 2016. They finished bottom of the Southern Conference.

== History ==
=== Foundation and early years ===
The club was founded in 1982, and the earliest record of their competitive activity comes from 1984, when they took part in the Papua New Guinea National Club Championship. They were drawn into Group Three and topped the group with a 100% record, but they needed two penalty shoot-outs to progress to the final, beating Guria Lahi 4–3 and Lae University 4–2 after both matches ended as 0–0 draws. In the final, they fell to Buresong 1–0.

In the 1988 competition, they finished third after losing to Guria Lahi in the semi-finals, before entering the regional Port Moresby Premier League for the first time in 1989, winning the competition.

=== Second regional title and several near misses ===
Historical records pick up again at the turn of the century, with the side taking part in the 1998 Port Moresby Premier League. The side finished top of the league with 67 points, seven clear of second-placed ICF University and well clear of the sides further back. A 3–1 victory over Defence was enough to see them into the final, but they were beaten by University 2–1 and denied a second title.

In June 1999, the side reached the final of the National Club Championship, losing 2–1 to Guria Lahi. Later that year, they made it to the knockout stages of the Port Moresby Premier League, defeating champions University but losing to PS United and Defence and eventually placing 3rd. The following year, the side progressed to the quarter-finals of the 2000 National Club Championship, before being beaten by eventual champions Unitech. The side were once again denied the Port Moresby Premier League by PS United, losing to the side 1–0 thanks to a Clement Anison own goal.

The 2001 Port Moresby Premier League was a disappointing one by Rapatona's standards, with the side finishing 5th in the league table and losing their only knockout game 3–0 against Defence in September. On 11 November 2001, the side were due to face Hatolol in the National Club Championship third-place match, but the results of the match are unknown. The side's poor placing in the Port Moresby Premier League meant they failed to qualify for the 2002 National Club Championship, and they haven't returned to the competition to date. However, the side finished third in the 2002 Port Moresby Premier League regular season table before progressing to the knockout finals, where they were again denied a title by ICF University.

In the final four seasons before the side joined the Papua New Guinea National Soccer League, the side continued their tradition of reaching the Port Moresby Premier League Grand Final every second year, having been runners-up in 1998, 2000 and 2002. The 2003 season was a flop, with the side finishing 6th in the league table and failing to qualify for the knockout stage entirely. However, in 2004 they picked up their first title in fifteen years, despite only finishing third in the league, eventually defeating league winners PS Rutz 1–0 in the Grand Final. In 2005 they reached the knockout stages again, losing to Souths United. While the 2006 season saw them reach a Grand Final for the final time, losing 4–2 on penalties to ICF University once again, after the score after extra-time remained 0–0.

=== National Soccer League ===
Shortly before the 2007–08 National Soccer League season, Rapatona once more competed in the Port Moresby Premier Division, finishing 4th in both the regular season table and the knockout stages. Under the sponsorship of Inspac, they entered the second edition of the NSL and played their first semi-professional match against fellow newcomers to the league, Besta Madang Fighters, winning 3–0. They would eventually go on to finish 4th in the league table, qualifying for the knockout stages, before going down 3–0 to Gelle Hills in the semi-final and losing 3–1 to Morobe Kumuls in the third-place playoff.

Ahead of the 2008–09 season, Rapatona secured sponsorship from South Korean building contractor CMSS, who had signed an agreement with the Papua New Guinean government to construct the Port Moresby Casino Hotel. The side was renamed CMSS Rapatona Tigers, but maintained their original name for the 2008 Port Moresby Premier League campaign, where they finished second in the regular season table. However, on 5 October 2008, the team were once again beaten in the knockout stages by ICF University. In the NSL, the team enjoyed another successful campaign, again finishing 4th in the league table before gaining revenge on ICF University, now under the name of University Inter, by defeating them 2–1 in the knockout semi-finals, thanks to goals from Richard Auram and Raymond Gunemba. The side were set to face Hekari United in the Grand Final, but following two postponements on 21 March and 28 March, the PNGFA awarded the championship to Hekari United, with approval from Rapatona, by virtue of their higher league position.

In the spring and summer of 2009, the side once again took part in the Port Moresby Premier League, but the season was cut short by the PNGFA after the Port Moresby Soccer Association was suspended. Rapatona led the league table at the time. Nevertheless, the side entered their third consecutive National Soccer League for the 2009–10 season, and qualified for the knockout stages for the third year in a row. However, a handball by Ila Ilaitia Jr allowed Gigira Laitepo Morobe to win against Rapatona in their semi-final 1–0, after substitute Kohu Liam converted the resulting penalty. This failure to reach the Grand Final prompted franchise owner Jimmy Kim to 'ponder' on the club's future in the NSL. The side did, however, secure third place with a 3–1 victory over University Inter.

=== Withdrawal from NSL ===
In July 2009, it was reported that the side had changed their name to Moresby Casino Hotel Tigers FC and had confirmed their participation in the upcoming 2010–11 season. However, a week later it was reported that the side were yet to submit the required forms to confirm their participation. Indeed, in early August it was confirmed that owner Jimmy Kim had withdrawn the side from the upcoming season, citing his need to focus on the construction of the Port Moresby Casino Hotel and disappointment that the side failed to reach the previous season's Grand Final.

In June 2012, it was reported that the club was now defunct, with several of their former players having since moved to Spartans. In May 2013, the side returned to football at the regional level, entering the Port Moresby Premier League for the first time in four years. In their first game back in the competition, they fought out a 1–1 draw with fellow former champions MacLaren FC. In mid-July, the side were top of the league, but in early August the side lost 4–3 to Defence, despite a hat-trick from Alwin Komolong, and their form began to stutter. However, the side qualified for the knockout stages by finishing in the top five, before losing to MacLaren in their only knockout match, placing them 5th overall.

The side entered the 2014 competition too, going into the final two fixtures leading the league table on goal difference ahead of MacLaren. In the final gameweek, the side lost 2–1 to MacLaren, and it is assumed that they finished the season in second place.

=== Return to NSL; Defection to National Premier League ===
Ahead of the 2015–16 National Soccer League season, it was revealed that the side, under new sponsorship from Posman Kua Aisi Lawyers (PKA), would be taking part in their first NSL for five seasons. The side were drawn into the Southern Zone, where they finished second behind Hekari United, thus qualifying for the Championship Playoff, which for the first time consisted of a Group stage with the top two teams from the Northern and Southern Zone. However, the side won just one match during the stage, finishing bottom of the table and 4th overall that season.

On 30 December 2016, Rapatona alongside 11 other associations across the country, confirmed they would be splitting from the National Soccer League. In February 2017, the new Papua New Guinea National Premier League was launched, with Rapatona's participation being confirmed shortly afterwards. However, the side's season was far from successful, finishing bottom of the Southern Conference and failing to return for the following season's competition.

== Honours ==
=== National competitions ===
- Papua New Guinea National Club Championship
  - Runners-up: 1984, 1999
- Papua New Guinea National Soccer League
  - Runners-up: 2008–09
  - Third: 2009–10

=== Regional competitions ===
- Port Moresby Premier League
  - Champions: 1989, 2004, 2009
  - Runners-up: 1998, 2000, 2002, 2006, 2014
  - Third: 1999
