= University Inter F.C. =

University Inter
- Full name: University Inter Football Club
- Founded: 1969
- Ground: Lloyd Robson Oval; Port Moresby, Papua New Guinea
- Capacity: 15,000
Home colours	Away colours

University Inter, founded as ANZ University and formerly known also as ICF University, and, simply, University, is the oldest known semi-professional club soccer club in Papua New Guinea, founded in 1969. It is the soccer club on the campus of the University of Papua New Guinea, based in Port Moresby.

The club's finest hour came when they were given the opportunity to represent Papua New Guinea at the 2007–08 OFC Champions League, after they won the 2006 Papua New Guinea National Club Championship and defeated Hekari United in a continental playoff. The side also won four consecutive National Club Championships between 1995 and 1998, and won the Port Moresby Premier League seven times between 1996 and 2012.

== History ==
=== Foundation and early years ===
The club was founded in 1969, but records of the club's competitive history are vague until the mid-1990s, although it has been claimed that they have won over 30 national titles. They collected the Papua New Guinea National Club Championship title in both 1995 and 1996, as well as lifting the Port Moresby Premier League in 1996 too. They secured a 2–0 victory over Babaka FC in the 1997 final, which won them their third consecutive title. They won their fourth in a row the following year, defeating Blue Kumuls 1–0 in the final; this would be their last national title for eight years. However, later that year, they went on to win the 1998 Port Moresby Premier League by defeating Rapatona 2–1 in the grand final.

It is unclear as to whether the team took part in the 1999 National Club Championship, but regionally, the side finished 5th in the regular season table of the Port Moresby Premier League, before securing 4th place through the playoffs, losing 1–0 to Rapatona in a repeat of the previous year's final. This poor performance meant they failed to qualify for the 2000 National Club Championship, although did finish top of the 2000 Port Moresby Premier League by five points, thus qualifying them for the following season's national event. This performance did not translate to the knockout stages though, where they were only able to finish third.

In 2001, the side reached the final of both the Port Moresby Premier League and the National Club Championship. Regionally, they defeated Cosmos 3–2 in the major semi-final before a 1–0 victory over PS United secured them their first title for three years. In the National Club Championship, despite a 6–1 drubbing of Hatolol in the semi-finals, the side were unable to translate this form into the final, losing 3–0 to Sobou FC. However, their domestic title ensured they would take part in the 2002 competition as well; however, Sobou were again their undoing, with title holders against putting three past University in a 3–1 semi-final defeat, with University having to settle for third place. In the Port Moresby Premier League, the side were able to secure their second consecutive title despite finishing 2nd in the league, defeating Rapatona 3–1 in the grand final.

In 2003, the side failed to get out of the group stages of the National Club Championship, while losing 2–1 against Cosmos in the Port Moresby Premier League grand final. The following season they fared no better, again failing to get past the group stages nationally, and finishing 4th in the regional competition. This was not enough to qualify them for the 2005 National Club Championship, but they were able to finish top of the 2005 Port Moresby Premier League table, securing national qualification again despite losing 2–0 to PS Rutz in the grand final.

=== OFC and NSL debuts ===
2006–2007 was one of the most successful periods in the club's history, and gained them reputation on a continental scale they had otherwise been unable to attain. From 5–9 June 2006, the side took part in the 2006 National Club Championship, and despite losing to Sobou FC in Pool A, the side still managed to qualify for the knockout stages as group runners-up. In the semi-finals, they faced PS Rutz, and scraped through 3–2 after extra time. In the grand final they faced Sobou FC again, and were able to hold the side to a 0–0 draw before defeating them on penalties, picking up their first national title since 1998. However, with the creation of the semi-professional Papua New Guinea National Soccer League (NSL), this no longer automatically made them national champions, nor did it qualify them for the OFC Champions League, which was in its infancy as a rebrand. They would have to defeat the inaugural champions of the NSL in a two-legged playoff in order to debut in their first ever continental competition.

In the meantime, the side completed another successful Port Moresby Premier League campaign, finishing top of the division before defeating Rapatona 4–2 on penalties in the grand final on 15 October 2006. On 25 November 2006, it was revealed that the side would have to face NSL Champions PRK Souths United in the continental playoff, which took place on 9 and 16 December 2006. In a surprise result, University emerged 4–2 winners on aggregate, and qualified for the 2007–08 OFC Champions League.

In June 2007, the side travelled to New Caledonia for the preliminary round of the Champions League. The side finished third in the group, after losing 2–0 to JS Baco of New Caledonia and 5–1 to Tafea of Vanuatu, while the Cook Islands representative Nikao withdrew. This was not enough to see them through to the main competition. With the 2007 National Club Championship cancelled, the side were able to focus on their regional performance, finishing 2nd in the 2007 Port Moresby Premier League table behind Souths United, before facing Souths in the grand final. The National Soccer League side were able to take revenge on University with a 2–1 victory to deny Inter a second consecutive title.

The following season, the team made the decision to turn semi-professional and enter the 2008–09 National Soccer League. Fresh from their third-place finish in the 2008 Port Moresby Premier League, the club was given soccer equipment valued at around K3,000 by German consulting company Deutsche Montan Technologies. The side ended up finishing second in the league table before losing 2–1 to Rapatona in the semi-finals, being awarded third place overall after the third-place playoff and the final were cancelled.

They entered the 2009–10 season too, finishing fourth in the league table and again qualifying for the semi-finals. However, they faced a dominant Hekari United side, who thrashed them 7–1. In the third-place playoff, they once again lost to Rapatona, 3–1, meaning they finished the season in 4th place.

=== Return to regional competition ===
The side decided not to return to National Soccer League action ahead of the 2010–11 season, and with the National Club Championship now defunct, the side took a step back to return solely to regional competition. In the 2010 edition, they defeated Yamaros 2–0 in the grand final to pick up their first title for five years, while in 2011, the side lost out to the Port Moresby School of Excellence (POMSoE) in the knockout stages, losing 2–1.

However, they would return to the top of Port Moresby football in 2012, finishing third in the regular season table but progressing through the knockout stages to the final, where they once again defeated Yamaros 1–0 with a goal from Felix Bondaluke to secure a second title in three years. The following season they finished 4th, while in 2014 they only managed to finish 6th.

After a two-year absence, the side reached the 2017 Premier League final, losing out to Mungkas 2–0 in December 2017. They maintained their excellent form the following season, finishing third, while 2019 saw them come in second behind Mungkas.

== Honours ==
=== National competitions ===
- Papua New Guinea National Club Championship
  - Champions: 1995, 1996, 1997, 1998, 2006
  - Runners-up: 2001
  - Third place: 2002
- Papua New Guinea National Soccer League
  - Third place: 2008–09

=== Regional competitions ===
- Port Moresby Premier League
  - Champions: 1996, 1998, 2001, 2002, 2006, 2010, 2012
  - Runners-up: 2003, 2005, 2007, 2017, 2019
  - Third place: 2000, 2008, 2009, 2018
