= Papua New Guinea National Club Championship =

National Club Championship
- Founded: 1976
- Country: Papua New Guinea
- Confederation: OFC
- Divisions: 2
- Most championships: Sobou F.C. (6 titles)

The Papua New Guinea National Club Championship is the regional division of soccer in Papua New Guinea. It is a nationwide league and was founded in 1970s.

The league was the highest level of football administered by the Papua New Guinea Football Association (PNGFA) until the introduction of the semi-professional National Soccer League in 2006. Thereafter, there were two seasons which ran alongside the semi-professional league, in 2006 and 2008, before the league became defunct. In June 2019, the PNGFA announced that the league was to be revived, as a combination of youth and reserve teams.

== History ==
=== Foundation ===
Attempts were made by the PNGFA in the mid-1970s to create a national league, similar to the current National Soccer League, but such a league was considered to be unfeasible due to the high airfare costs that clubs would incur by travelling each weekend. Instead, two competitions were run: The Haus Bilas Cup, which was an inter-district competition, and the National Club Championship, into which were invited the winners and runners-up of the local leagues. The National Club Championship became the de facto highest level of football at this time, and was generally played over one weekend at Easter.

=== 1976–1994: Early years ===
It appears the first National Club Championship took place in 1976, and was won by Mopi FC from Lae. The early years were dominated by sides from Lae and Port Moresby, with Mopi picking up a second title in 1981 and Buresong FC, also from Lae, winning in 1982 and 1984, while four Port Moresby-based sides won the remaining five competitions played between 1976 and 1987: Germania FC (1977), Tarangau FC (1978, 1979), Guria FC (1986) and Westpac FC (1987).

Due to their victory in 1986, Guria FC qualified for the inaugural Oceania Club Championship held in 1987 in Adelaide, Australia. The side lost their opening qualification match and progressed no further.

Guria Lahi became the first side outside of the two soccer strongholds to win the National Club Championship, in 1988. Playing against two-time champions Buresong in the final, the Lahi-based team won 1–0.

In 1989 and 1992, Guria FC won their second and third titles, claiming the record for most championships, which would stand until 1999.

=== 1995–2005: Pre-NSL growth and further OFC qualification ===
In the four years from 1995 to 1999, the competition was won by one side – ICF University. The side won their first title in 1995, before final victories against Telikom Lae in 1996, Babaka in 1997, and Blue Kumuls Lae in 1998 gave them the record for the most domestic titles at that time. However, in 1999, Guria Lahi once again broke the dominance of capital-based sides, beating Port Moresby-based Rapatona 2–1 in the final.

With the prospect of the 2001 Oceania Club Championship taking place in Port Moresby, for the second time there was an opportunity for the national champion to qualify for a continental competition. Guria Lahi reached the final once again, but were defeated 3–2 by Unitech, with the university-based side qualifying for the Oceania Club Championship as a result. The side won two out of their five group matches and finished fourth in the group.

The next five editions of the competition were won by Sobou FC, who picked up their first title in 2001 with a 3–1 victory over four-time champions ICF University. In 2005, they picked up their fifth title, breaking the University's record of the most national championships. As national champions, Sobou qualified for the 2005 and 2006 editions of the OFC Club Championship, but failed to register any victories in the finals.

=== 2006–2008: Cancellation ===
With the launch of the semi-professional National Soccer League, the PNGFA decided to run both competitions alongside each other in 2006, with the winner of each going head-to-head in the "Overall Championship", a two-legged tie, the winner of which would qualify for the 2007–08 OFC Champions League. Despite losing to them in the group stage, University defeated Sobou on penalties in the final, clinching their fifth title and equalling Sobou's record, before defeating NSL champions Hekari United 4–2 on aggregate, thus qualifying for the Champions League. However, they were unable to get beyond the preliminary round.

The 2007 edition of the National Club Championship didn't materialise, while in 2008, the title was won by Sunammad FC, the first national club title won by a club from West New Britain and from the New Guinea Islands Province.

=== 2019: Revival ===
In June 2019, it was announced that the competition would be revived. Under a new system, regional competitions took place across all four regions of the country – Northern (Momase), Southern (Papua), Highlands and Islands – in June and July 2019, before the winners came together for the finals in September. The champions were Mungkas, who picked up their first championship with a 1–0 victory over City United of Lae.

== List of champions ==
Season	Champion	Runner-up	Score
1976	Mopi FC	unknown	N/A
1977	Germania FC	unknown	N/A
1978	Tarangau	unknown	N/A
1979	Tarangau	unknown	N/A
1980	no competition		
1981	Mopi FC	unknown	N/A
1982	Buresong	Guria FC	7–3
1983	no competition		
1984	Buresong	Rapatona	1–0
1985	no competition		
1986	Guria FC	unknown	N/A
1987	Westpac FC	Guria FC	2–0
1988	Guria Lahi	Buresong	1–0
1989	Guria FC	Buresong	e1–0
1990	Leipon Manus	Morobe United	p0–0
1991	unknown		
1992	Guria FC	PTC Isifone	p0–0
1993	unknown		

Season	Winner	Runner-up	Score
1994	unknown		
1995	University	unknown	N/A
1996	University	Telikom Lae	1–0
1997	University	Babaka	2–0
1998	University	Blue Kumuls	1–0
1999	Guria Lahi	Rapatona	2–1
2000	Unitech FC	Guria Lahi	3–2
2001	Sobou FC	University	3–1
2002	Sobou FC	PS United	1–0
2003	Sobou FC	Unitech FC	1–0
2004	Sobou FC	HC West	2–0
2005	Sobou FC	Cosmos	4–2
2006	University	Sobou FC	p0–0
2007	no competition		
2008	Sunammad FC	Poro FC	p1–1
2009–2018	no competition		
2019	Mungkas	City United	1–0

=== List by team ===
Team	1st place	2nd place
Sobou FC	5	1
University	5	1
Guria FC	3	2
Buresong	2	2
Guria Lahi	2	1
Mopi FC	2	0
Tarangau	2	0
Unitech FC	1	1
Germania FC	1	0
Westpac FC	1	0
Leipon Manus	1	0
Sunammad FC	1	0
Mungkas	1	0
Morobe United (inc. Blue Kumuls)	0	2
Rapatona	0	2
