= 2012 OFC Nations Cup squads =

The 2012 OFC Nations Cup was an international football tournament that was held in the Solomon Islands from 1 to 10 June 2012. The 11 national teams involved in the tournament were required to register a squad of players; only players in these squads were eligible to take part in the tournament. An initial four-team qualifying phase took place in Samoa from 22 to 26 November 2011 allowing the winner, Samoa, to move on and join the other seven teams at the main tournament.

Players marked (c) were named as captain for their national squad. Players' club teams and players' age are as of 1 June 2012 – the tournament's opening day.

A full list of all the national teams squads, with date of birth and shirt number can be seen on OFC official site.

== Group A ==
=== Vanuatu ===
Coach: Percy Avock

No.	Pos.	Player	Date of birth (age)	Caps	Club
1	GK	Ernest Bong	29 February 1984 (aged 28)		(Vanuatu) Amicale
2	DF	Kevin Shem	5 December 1993 (aged 18)		(Vanuatu) Tafea
3	DF	Paul Young	3 October 1988 (age 37)		(Vanuatu) Amicale
4	DF	Selwyn Sese'ala	14 August 1986 (aged 25)		(Vanuatu) Amicale
5	DF	Robert Tom	6 April 1978 (aged 34)		(Vanuatu) Tafea
6	DF	Freddy Vava	25 November 1982 (aged 29)		(Vanuatu) Tafea
7	MF	Jean Yelou (c)	25 September 1983 (aged 28)		(Vanuatu) Amicale
8	MF	Silas Namatak	8 December 1990 (aged 21)		(Vanuatu) Tafea
9	MF	Derek Malas	10 December 1983 (aged 28)		(Vanuatu) Amicale
10	FW	Jean Kaltak	19 August 1994 (aged 17)		(Vanuatu) Erakor Golden Star
11	FW	Robert Tasso	18 December 1989 (aged 22)		(Vanuatu) Spirit 08
12	FW	Joseph Namariau	12 January 1988 (aged 24)		(Vanuatu) Tafea
13	MF	François Sakama	12 December 1987 (aged 24)		(Vanuatu) Tafea
14	FW	Kensi Tangis	19 December 1991 (aged 20)		(Vanuatu) Amicale
15	DF	Alphonse Bongnaim	22 August 1985 (aged 26)		(Vanuatu) Amicale
16	GK	Seiloni Iaruel	17 April 1995 (aged 17)		(Vanuatu) Tafea
17	FW	Jean Nako Naprapol	20 July 1980 (aged 31)		(Vanuatu) Amicale
18	MF	Michel Kaltak	12 November 1990 (aged 21)		(Papua New Guinea) Hekari United
19	MF	Roddy Lenga	22 April 1990 (aged 22)		(Vanuatu) Amicale
20	DF	Lucien Hinge	21 March 1992 (aged 20)		(Vanuatu) Tafea
21	MF	Dominique Fred	21 October 1992 (aged 19)		(Vanuatu) Shepherds United
22	DF	Brian Kaltak	30 September 1993 (aged 18)		(Papua New Guinea) Hekari United
23	GK	Simon Tousi	9 March 1992 (aged 20)		(Vanuatu) Siwi

=== New Caledonia ===
Coach: (France) Alain Moizan

No.	Pos.	Player	Date of birth (age)	Caps	Club
1	GK	Rocky Nyikeine	26 May 1992 (aged 20)		(New Caledonia) Gaïtcha
2	DF	Judikael Ixoée	17 March 1990 (aged 22)		(France) Hyères
3	DF	Emile Béaruné	7 February 1990 (aged 22)		(New Caledonia) Gaïtcha
4	DF	Georges Béaruné	27 July 1989 (aged 22)		(New Caledonia) Gaïtcha
5	FW	Kalaje Gnipate	24 July 1985 (aged 26)		(New Caledonia) Mont-Dore
6	MF	Olivier Dokunengo (c)	4 September 1979 (aged 32)		(New Caledonia) Mont-Dore
7	MF	Dominique Wacalie	14 August 1982 (aged 29)		(France) Bourges 18
8	MF	Miguel Kayara	11 August 1986 (aged 25)		(New Caledonia) Hienghène Sport
9	FW	Jacques Haeko	23 April 1984 (aged 28)		(New Caledonia) Lössi
10	MF	Marius Bako	22 February 1985 (aged 27)		(New Caledonia) Gaïtcha
11	FW	Bertrand Kaï	6 June 1983 (aged 28)		(New Caledonia) Hienghène Sport
12	MF	Roy Kayara	2 May 1990 (aged 22)		(New Caledonia) Magenta
13	MF	Noël Kaudré	30 April 1981 (aged 31)		(New Caledonia) Magenta
14	DF	Dick Kauma	1 March 1988 (aged 24)		(New Caledonia) Lössi
15	DF	Jean-Patrick Wakanumuné	13 March 1980 (aged 32)		(New Caledonia) Magenta
16	FW	Iamel Kabeu	7 September 1982 (aged 29)		(French Polynesia) Manu-Ura
17	MF	Joël Wakanumuné	30 September 1986 (aged 25)		(France) Chambéry
18	MF	Jonathan Kakou	18 December 1989 (aged 22)		(New Caledonia) Magenta
19	FW	Georges Gope-Fenepej	23 October 1988 (aged 23)		(New Caledonia) Magenta
20	GK	Marc Ounemoa	27 January 1973 (aged 39)		(New Caledonia) Baco

=== Samoa ===
Coach: Malo Vaga

No.	Pos.	Player	Date of birth (age)	Caps	Club
1	GK	Aukusitino Aitupe	23 January 1985 (aged 27)		(Samoa)
2	DF	Andrew Setefano (c)	10 August 1987 (aged 24)		(Samoa) Goldstar Sogi
3	DF	Peni Kitiona	24 June 1994 (aged 17)		(Samoa)
4	DF	Vaalii Faalogo	9 November 1983 (aged 28)		(Samoa) Kiwi
5	DF	Tamoto Fenika	5 September 1988 (aged 23)		(Samoa) Kiwi
6	MF	Silao Malo	30 December 1990 (aged 21)		(Samoa) Kiwi
7	DF	Jarrell Sale	16 September 1984 (aged 27)		(Samoa) Kiwi
8	MF	Joseph Hoeflich	12 April 1984 (aged 28)		(Samoa) Kiwi
9	FW	Max Hoeflich	22 December 1986 (aged 25)		(Samoa) Kiwi
10	FW	Luki Gosche	13 January 1986 (aged 26)		(Samoa) Kiwi
11	FW	Suivai Ataga	21 April 1987 (aged 25)		(Samoa)
12	FW	Mike Saofaiga	12 January 1991 (aged 21)		(Samoa) Kiwi
13	DF	Sapati Umutaua	25 November 1987 (aged 24)		(Samoa)
14	MF	Sopo Fa'kaua	23 February 1988 (aged 24)		(Samoa)
15	MF	Patrick Asiata	13 August 1985 (aged 26)		(Samoa) Kiwi
16	FW	Amilale Esaroma	24 July 1985 (aged 26)		(Samoa)
17	FW	Spencer Keli	26 October 1985 (aged 26)		(Samoa)
19	DF	Masei Amosa	24 May 1988 (aged 24)		(Samoa)
21	GK	Ethan Hanns	11 November 1988 (aged 23)		(Samoa)
22	GK	Motu Hafoka	13 March 1987 (aged 25)		(Samoa) Moaula United

=== Tahiti ===
Coach: Eddy Etaeta

No.	Pos.	Player	Date of birth (age)	Caps	Club
1	GK	Mikaël Roche	24 December 1982 (aged 29)		(French Polynesia) Dragon
2	FW	Alvin Tehau	10 April 1989 (aged 23)		(French Polynesia) Tefana
3	DF	Tamatoa Wagemann	18 March 1980 (aged 32)		(France) Changé
4	DF	Teheivarii Ludivion	1 July 1989 (aged 22)		(French Polynesia) Vénus
6	MF	Lorenzo Tehau	10 April 1989 (aged 23)		(French Polynesia) Tefana
7	MF	Henri Caroine	7 September 1981 (aged 30)		(French Polynesia) Dragon
8	DF	Angelo Tchen	8 March 1982 (aged 30)		(French Polynesia) Tefana
9	FW	Teaonui Tehau	1 September 1992 (aged 19)		(French Polynesia) Vénus
10	DF	Nicolas Vallar (c)	22 October 1983 (aged 28)		(French Polynesia) Dragon
11	FW	Manaraii Porlier	1 December 1989 (aged 22)		(French Polynesia) Excelsior
12	MF	Hiroana Poroiae	14 June 1986 (aged 25)		(French Polynesia) Manu-Ura
13	FW	Steevy Chong Hue	26 January 1990 (aged 22)		(Belgium) Bleid-Gaume
14	FW	Roihau Degage	12 December 1988 (aged 23)		(French Polynesia) Tefana
15	MF	Heimano Bourebare	15 May 1989 (aged 23)		(French Polynesia) Tefana
16	MF	Pierre Kohumoetini	18 February 1987 (aged 25)		(French Polynesia) Saint-Étienne Ua Pou
17	MF	Jonathan Tehau	9 January 1988 (aged 24)		(French Polynesia) Tamarii
18	DF	Edson Lemaire	31 October 1990 (aged 21)		(French Polynesia) Vairao
19	DF	Vincent Simon	28 September 1983 (aged 28)		(French Polynesia) Dragon
21	GK	Xavier Samin	1 January 1978 (aged 34)		(French Polynesia) Tefana

== Group B ==
=== Fiji ===
Coach: (Uruguay) Juan Carlos Buzzetti

No.	Pos.	Player	Date of birth (age)	Caps	Club
1	GK	Simione Tamanisau (c)	5 June 1982 (aged 29)		(Fiji) Lautoka
2	DF	Avineshwaran Suwamy	22 February 1986 (aged 26)		(Fiji) Ba
3	DF	Paulo Posiano	7 April 1988 (aged 24)		(Fiji) Rewa
4	DF	Samuela Vula	22 August 1984 (aged 27)		(Fiji) Suva
5	DF	Taniela Waqa	22 June 1983 (aged 28)		(Papua New Guinea) Hekari United
6	DF	Alvin Singh	9 June 1988 (aged 23)		(Fiji) Ba
7	MF	Pita Baleitoga	30 November 1984 (aged 27)		(Papua New Guinea) Hekari United
8	MF	Malakai Tiwa	3 October 1986 (aged 25)		(Fiji) Ba
9	FW	Osea Vakatalesau	15 January 1986 (aged 26)		(Fiji) Ba
10	MF	Alvin Avinesh	6 April 1982 (aged 30)		(Fiji) Lautoka
11	FW	Roy Krishna	20 August 1987 (aged 24)		(New Zealand) Waitakere United
12	DF	Remueru Tekiate	7 August 1990 (aged 21)		(Fiji) Ba
14	DF	Ilaitia Tuilau	8 May 1987 (aged 25)		(Papua New Guinea) Hekari United
15	FW	Maciu Dunadamu	14 June 1986 (aged 25)		(Papua New Guinea) Hekari United
16	DF	Samuela Kautoga	3 February 1987 (aged 25)		(Vanuatu) Amicale
17	MF	Apisai Smith	25 August 1983 (aged 28)		(Fiji) Rewa
18	DF	Archie Watkins	15 September 1989 (aged 22)		(Fiji) Nadroga
19	MF	Peni Finau	5 August 1981 (aged 30)		(Fiji) Lautoka
21	MF	Ilisoni Tuinawaivuvu	8 January 1991 (aged 21)		(Fiji) Rewa
22	MF	Misaele Draunibaka	6 April 1992 (aged 20)		(Fiji) Rewa
23	GK	Beniamino Mateinaqara	18 August 1987 (aged 24)		(Fiji) Nadi

=== New Zealand ===
Coach: Ricki Herbert

No.	Pos.	Player	Date of birth (age)	Caps	Club
1	GK	Michael O'Keeffe	9 August 1990 (aged 21)	0	(New Zealand) Canterbury United
2	DF	Tim Myers	17 September 1990 (aged 21)	0	(New Zealand) Waitakere United
3	DF	Tony Lochhead	12 January 1982 (aged 30)	35	(New Zealand) Wellington Phoenix
4	DF	Ben Sigmund	2 March 1981 (aged 31)	21	(New Zealand) Wellington Phoenix
5	DF	Tommy Smith (c)	31 March 1990 (aged 22)	11	(England) Ipswich Town
6	DF	Ian Hogg	15 December 1989 (aged 22)	2	(New Zealand) Auckland City
7	MF	Leo Bertos	20 December 1981 (aged 30)	42	(New Zealand) Wellington Phoenix
8	MF	Michael McGlinchey	7 January 1987 (aged 25)	13	(Australia) Central Coast Mariners
9	FW	Shane Smeltz	29 September 1981 (aged 30)	39	(Australia) Perth Glory
10	FW	Chris Killen	8 October 1981 (aged 30)	40	(China) Chongqing
11	MF	Marco Rojas	11 May 1991 (aged 21)	5	(Australia) Melbourne Victory
12	GK	Glen Moss	19 January 1983 (aged 29)	19	(New Zealand) Wellington Phoenix
13	GK	Jake Gleeson	26 June 1990 (aged 21)	1	(United States) Portland Timbers
14	FW	Rory Fallon	20 March 1982 (aged 30)	11	(Scotland) Aberdeen
15	DF	Ivan Vicelich	3 September 1976 (aged 35)	76	(New Zealand) Auckland City
16	FW	Jeremy Brockie	7 October 1987 (aged 24)	27	(New Zealand) Wellington Phoenix
17	FW	Kosta Barbarouses	15 January 1990 (aged 22)	7	(Russia) Alania Vladikavkaz
18	MF	Aaron Clapham	15 January 1987 (aged 25)	6	(New Zealand) Canterbury United
19	DF	Michael Boxall	18 August 1988 (aged 23)	5	(Canada) Vancouver Whitecaps
20	FW	Chris Wood	7 December 1991 (aged 20)	20	(England) West Bromwich Albion
21	MF	Cameron Howieson	22 December 1994 (aged 17)	2	(England) Burnley
22	MF	Tim Payne	10 January 1994 (aged 18)	1	(England) Blackburn Rovers
23	DF	Adam McGeorge	30 March 1989 (aged 23)	1	(New Zealand) Auckland City

=== Solomon Islands ===
Coach: Jacob Moli

No.	Pos.	Player	Date of birth (age)	Caps	Club
1	GK	Shadrack Ramoni	5 May 1988 (aged 24)		(Solomon Islands) Koloale
2	DF	Hadisi Aengari	23 October 1988 (aged 23)		(Solomon Islands) Solomon Warriors
3	MF	Mostyn Beui	21 January 1980 (aged 32)		(Solomon Islands) Koloale
4	MF	Jeffery Bule	15 November 1991 (aged 20)		(Solomon Islands) Solomon Warriors
5	MF	Henry Fa'arodo (c)	5 October 1982 (aged 29)		(New Zealand) Team Wellington
6	DF	Tome Faisi	21 January 1982 (aged 30)		(Solomon Islands) Solomon Warriors
7	FW	Abraham Iniga	21 November 1979 (aged 32)		(Solomon Islands) Marist Fire
9	DF	Freddie Kini	27 November 1992 (aged 19)		(Solomon Islands) Koloale
10	FW	Joe Luwi	18 July 1983 (aged 28)		(Solomon Islands) Western United
11	FW	Nicholas Muri	29 December 1983 (aged 28)		(Solomon Islands) Real Kakamora
12	MF	James Naka	9 October 1984 (aged 27)		(Solomon Islands) Koloale
13	MF	Leslie Nate	25 June 1986 (aged 25)		(Solomon Islands) Kossa
14	MF	Joses Nawo	3 May 1988 (aged 24)		(Solomon Islands) Koloale
15	DF	Seni Ngava	14 September 1988 (aged 23)		(Solomon Islands) Kossa
16	DF	Loni Qaraba	8 November 1984 (aged 27)		(Solomon Islands) Western United
17	DF	Nelson Sale Kilifa	7 October 1986 (aged 25)		(Vanuatu) Amicale
18	MF	Himson Teleda	18 July 1992 (aged 19)		(Solomon Islands) Western United
19	FW	Benjamin Totori	20 February 1986 (aged 26)		(Solomon Islands) Koloale
20	GK	Felix Ray Jr.	12 September 1983 (aged 28)		(Solomon Islands) Malaita Kingz
21	DF	Joshua Tuasulia	14 June 1988 (aged 23)		(Solomon Islands) Marist Fire
22	MF	Jack Wetney	4 March 1990 (aged 22)		(Solomon Islands) Western United
23	DF	Aleck Wickham	1 September 1978 (aged 33)		(Solomon Islands) Western United

=== Papua New Guinea ===
Coach: (Australia) Frank Farina

No.	Pos.	Player	Date of birth (age)	Caps	Club
1	GK	Leslie Kalai	6 December 1984 (aged 27)		(Papua New Guinea) Hekari United
2	DF	Kila Iaravai	7 January 1991 (aged 21)		(Papua New Guinea) Morobe Kumuls
3	DF	Valentine Nelson	12 April 1987 (aged 25)		(Papua New Guinea) Tukoko University
4	DF	Daniel Joe	29 May 1990 (aged 22)		(Papua New Guinea) Hekari United
5	DF	Kelly Jampu	22 October 1986 (aged 25)		(Papua New Guinea) University Inter
6	MF	Samuel Kini	10 October 1987 (aged 24)		(Papua New Guinea) Hekari United
7	FW	Raymond Gunemba	4 June 1986 (aged 25)		(Papua New Guinea) Hekari United
8	MF	Michael Foster	5 September 1985 (aged 26)		(Papua New Guinea) Eastern Stars
9	FW	Kema Jack	10 January 1982 (aged 30)		(Papua New Guinea) Hekari United
10	FW	Reggie Davani	5 February 1980 (aged 32)		(Papua New Guinea) Morobe Kumuls
11	DF	Felix Bondaluke	10 December 1986 (aged 25)		(Papua New Guinea) Eastern Stars
12	MF	David Muta (c)	24 October 1987 (aged 24)		(Papua New Guinea) Hekari United
13	DF	Andrew Lepani	28 August 1979 (aged 32)		(Papua New Guinea) Hekari United
14	MF	Niel Hans	24 April 1988 (aged 24)		(Papua New Guinea) Hekari United
15	FW	Jamal Seeto	8 September 1990 (aged 21)		(Papua New Guinea) Besta PNG United
16	DF	Jeremy Yasasa	27 March 1985 (aged 27)		(Papua New Guinea) Eastern Stars
17	MF	Mauri Wasi	6 December 1982 (aged 29)		(New Zealand) Birkenhead United
18	MF	Eric Komeng	16 June 1984 (aged 27)		(Papua New Guinea) Hekari United
19	DF	Koriak Upaiga	13 June 1987 (aged 24)		(Papua New Guinea) Hekari United
20	GK	Godfrey Baniau	28 February 1977 (aged 35)		(Papua New Guinea) Hekari United
21	MF	Ronald Conn	4 March 1992 (aged 20)		(Papua New Guinea) Tukoko University
22	MF	Wira Wama	24 October 1989 (aged 22)		(Papua New Guinea) Hekari United
23	GK	Paul Kawik	4 May 1982 (aged 30)		(Papua New Guinea) Eastern Stars

== Player representation ==
=== By club nationality ===
Players	Clubs
28	Papua New Guinea
23	Vanuatu
20	Solomon Islands
18	(French Polynesia) Tahiti
16	New Caledonia
15	Fiji
14	New Zealand
11	Samoa
4	England, France
3	Australia
1	Belgium, Canada, China, Russia, Scotland, United States

Nations in italics are not represented by their national teams in the finals.

=== By representatives of domestic league ===
National Squad	No.
Fiji	15
New Caledonia	16
New Zealand	11
Papua New Guinea	22
Samoa	11
Solomon Islands	20
Tahiti	17
Vanuatu	21
