= List of Papua New Guinea international footballers =

The Papua New Guinea national football team represents the country of Papua New Guinea in international association football. It is fielded by the Papua New Guinea Football Association, the governing body of football in Papua New Guinea, and competes as a member of the Oceania Football Confederation (OFC), which encompasses the countries of Oceania. Papua New Guinea played their first international match on 29 August 1963 in a 3–1 loss to Fiji in Suva.

Papua New Guinea has competed in numerous competitions, and all players who have played in at least one international match, either as a member of the starting eleven or as a substitute, are listed below. Each player's details include his playing position while with the team, the number of caps earned and goals scored in all international matches, and details of the first and most recent matches played in. The names are initially ordered by number of caps (in descending order), then by date of debut, then by alphabetical order. All statistics are correct up to and including the match played on 27 September 2022.

== Key ==
Positions key
GK	Goalkeeper
DF	Defender
MF	Midfielder
FW	Forward

Position
Playing positions are listed according to the tactical formations that were employed at the time.
Caps and goals
Caps and goals comprise those in the FIFA World Cup and OFC Nations Cup, Melanesia Cup, their associated qualification matches, as well as Pacific Games matches and international friendly tournaments and matches.

== Players ==
Papua New Guinea national team football players
Player	Pos.	Caps	Goals	Debut		Last or most recent match		Ref.
Player	Pos.	Caps	Goals	Date	Opponent	Date	Opponent	Ref.
Michael Foster	MF	29	7	7 July 2003	Micronesia	27 March 2022	Solomon Islands	
Raymond Gunemba	MF	26	11	2 June 2012	Solomon Islands	27 September 2022	Fiji	
Emmanuel Simon	MF	24	4	6 September 2014	Singapore	27 September 2022	Fiji	
Ronald Warisan	GK	23	0	6 September 2014	Singapore	27 September 2022	Fiji	
Daniel Joe	DF	22	0	2 June 2012	Solomon Islands	27 September 2022	Fiji	
Felix Komolong	DF	21	0	24 March 2016	Solomon Islands	27 March 2022	Solomon Islands	
Koriak Upaiga	DF	20	2	3 September 2011	Kiribati	27 March 2022	Solomon Islands	
Alwin Komolong	DF	20	1	29 May 2016	New Caledonia	27 September 2022	Fiji	
Richard Daniel	MF	19	1	16 September 1996	Solomon Islands	19 May 2004	Samoa	
Nigel Dabinyaba	FW	19	9	6 September 2014	Singapore	27 September 2022	Fiji	
Jacob Sabua	MF	19	0	29 May 2016	New Caledonia	24 September 2022	Vanuatu	
David Muta	MF	18	1	27 August 2011	Cook Islands	18 March 2022	New Zealand	
Reggie Davani	MF	17	13	12 March 2002	New Caledonia	6 June 2012	Fiji	
Tommy Semmy	FW	15	5	6 September 2014	Singapore	27 March 2022	Solomon Islands	
Maurie Wasi	FW	14	5	16 March 2002	Samoa	6 September 2014	Singapore	
Paul Komboi	MF	13	4	12 March 2002	New Caledonia	19 May 2004	Samoa	
Joe Aisa	DF	12	4	16 September 1996	Solomon Islands	9 July 2002	Tahiti	
Andrew Lepani	MF	12	5	30 June 2003	New Caledonia	5 September 2011	Fiji	
Yanding Tomda	DF	11	1	12 March 2002	New Caledonia	19 May 2004	Samoa	
Francis Moiyap	FW	10	2	12 March 2002	New Caledonia	19 May 2004	Samoa	
Valentine Nelson	DF	10	0	27 August 2011	Cook Islands	27 March 2016	Solomon Islands	
Jeremy Yasasa	DF	10	0	27 August 2011	Cook Islands	5 June 2016	Samoa	
Patrick Aisa	FW	10	3	12 October 2014	Philippines	18 July 2019	Tonga	
Selan Elizah	MF	9	1	12 March 2002	New Caledonia	19 May 2004	Samoa	
Kolu Kepo	FW	9	4	14 November 2016	Malaysia	27 September 2022	Samoa	
Geoffrey Emang	MF	8	1	16 June 1996	Solomon Islands	10 May 2004	Vanuatu	
Nathaniel Lepani	MF	8	6	10 May 2004	Vanuatu	5 September 2011	Fiji	
Neil Hans	FW	8	1	13 July 2007	Solomon Islands	12 October 2014	Philippines	
Ati Kepo	FW	8	3	8 July 2019	Samoa	27 September 2022	Fiji	
Willie Bera	GK	7	0	16 September 1996	Solomon Islands	21 June 1997	Fiji	
Harrison Kamake	DF	7	0	20 September 1996	Vanuatu	9 July 2002	Tahiti	
Tapas Posman	GK	7	1	18 March 2002	American Samoa	19 May 2004	Samoa	
David Aua	GK	7	0	5 July 2002	Solomon Islands	3 September 2011	Kiribati	
Eric Komeng	MF	7	1	19 May 2004	Samoa	6 June 2012	Fiji	
Leslie Kalai	GK	7	0	27 August 2011	Cook Islands	17 June 2016	Malaysia	
Steven Mune	FW	6	0	16 September 1996	Solomon Islands	21 June 1997	Fiji	
Gidix Nasa	DF	6	0	16 September 1996	Solomon Islands	21 June 1997	Fiji	
Francis Niakuam	FW	6	1	16 September 1996	Solomon Islands	21 June 1997	Fiji	
Duri Yarawi	MF	6	0	16 September 1996	Solomon Islands	21 June 1997	Fiji	
Michael Lohai	MF	6	3	14 March 2002	Tonga	19 May 2004	Samoa	
Hans Fred	DF	6	0	5 July 2002	Solomon Islands	17 May 2004	American Samoa	
Jonah Malus	FW	6	0	5 July 2002	Solomon Islands	3 July 2003	Tahiti	
Desmond Sow	MF	6	1	5 July 2002	Solomon Islands	3 July 2003	Tahiti	
Samuel Kini	MF	6	3	3 September 2011	Kiribati	28 March 2017	Tahiti	
Batman Furigi	DF	5	1	20 September 1996	Vanuatu	21 June 1997	Fiji	
Roy Karang	MF	5	1	20 September 1996	Vanuatu	21 June 1997	Fiji	
Gari Moka	FW	5	3	27 August 2011	Cook Islands	12 October 2014	Philippines	
Wira Wama	MF	5	0	24 March 2016	Solomon Islands	17 June 2016	Malaysia	
Abel Redenut	DF	5	0	23 March 2017	Tahiti	24 September 2022	Vanuatu	
Yagi Yasasa	MF	5	0	18 March 2022	New Zealand	27 September 2022	Fiji	
Peter Paliwa	DF	4	1	31 May 1997	New Zealand	15 April 2000	Vanuatu	
Wesley Waiwai	FW	4	1	31 May 1997	New Zealand	21 June 1997	Fiji	
Ken Gule	MF	4	0	16 March 2002	Samoa	9 July 2002	Tahiti	
Alex Davani	MF	4	3	30 June 2003	New Caledonia	7 July 2003	Micronesia	
Ravu Habuka	FW	4	1	30 June 2003	New Caledonia	7 July 2003	Micronesia	
Chique Posman	MF	4	2	30 June 2003	New Caledonia	7 July 2003	Micronesia	
Kema Jack	FW	4	1	13 July 2007	Solomon Islands	6 June 2012	Fiji	
Kelly Jampu	DF	4	0	1 September 2011	Tahiti	2 June 2012	Solomon Islands	
Joshua Talau	DF	4	0	12 October 2014	Philippines	27 March 2022	Solomon Islands	
Philip Steven	DF	4	0	24 March 2016	Solomon Islands	24 September 2022	Vanuatu	
Clement Willis	DF	4	0	23 March 2017	Tahiti	13 June 2017	Solomon Islands	
Panniu Carrol	DF	3	0	31 May 1997	New Zealand	15 June 1997	Fiji	
Hans Gewebing	FW	3	0	31 May 1997	New Zealand	15 June 1997	Fiji	
Abraham Encoh	MF	3	0	30 June 2003	New Caledonia	10 May 2004	Vanuatu	
Ricky Mesak	DF	3	0	30 June 2003	New Caledonia	7 July 2003	Micronesia	
Russell Inai	DF	3	0	1 July 2003	Tonga	7 July 2003	Micronesia	
Adrian Komu	MF	3	0	10 May 2004	Vanuatu	17 May 2004	American Samoa	
Cyril Muta	DF	3	1	27 August 2011	Cook Islands	6 September 2014	Singapore	
Jamal Seeto	FW	2	0	4 June 2012	New Zealand	6 June 2012	Fiji	
Roland Bala	DF	3	0	17 June 2016	Malaysia	14 November 2016	Malaysia	
Obert Bika	MF	3	0	17 June 2016	Malaysia	13 June 2017	Solomon Islands	
David Browne	FW	3	0	23 March 2017	Tahiti	13 June 2017	Solomon Islands	
Emmanuel Airem	DF	3	0	21 March 2022	New Caledonia	27 March 2022	Solomon Islands	
Pala Paul	MF	3	0	21 March 2022	New Caledonia	27 September 2022	Fiji	
Manis Lamond	MF	2	0	16 September 1996	Solomon Islands	20 September 1996	Vanuatu	
Beneho Luluai	DF	2	0	16 September 1996	Solomon Islands	20 September 1996	Vanuatu	
Desmond Waku	FW	2	0	16 September 1996	Solomon Islands	20 September 1996	Vanuatu	
Steven Mali	MF	2	1	11 April 2000	New Caledonia	5 July 2002	Solomon Islands	
Paulo Paterson		2	0	12 March 2002	New Caledonia	16 March 2002	Samoa	
Andrew Kassam	FW	2	1	14 March 2002	Tonga	16 March 2002	Samoa	
Nasa Wangu	MF	2	0	14 March 2002	Tonga	18 March 2002	American Samoa	
Nathan Pomat	FW	2	2	1 July 2003	Tahiti	7 July 2003	Micronesia	
Armstrong Peka	FW	2	0	3 July 2003	Tahiti	7 July 2003	Micronesia	
Felix Bondaluk	DF	2	0	3 September 2011	Kiribati	5 September 2011	Fiji	
Kila Iaravai	DF	2	0	4 June 2012	New Zealand	4 June 2012	New Zealand	
Agi Moses	DF	2	0	6 September 2014	Singapore	12 October 2014	Philippines	
Richard Alois	FW	2	0	23 March 2017	Tahiti	28 March 2017	Tahiti	
Jonathan Allen	FW	2	0	18 July 2019	Tonga	27 September 2022	Fiji	
Mathew David	FW	2	0	21 March 2022	New Caledonia	27 September 2022	Fiji	
Dallas Namuesh	FW	2	0	24 September 2022	Vanuatu	27 September 2022	Fiji	
Oberth Simon	MF	2	0	24 September 2022	Vanuatu	27 September 2022	Fiji	
Paulus		1	1	3 November 1990	New Caledonia	3 November 1990	New Caledonia	
L. Isalah		1	1	13 April 2000	Solomon Islands	13 April 2000	Solomon Islands	
Trevor Ire	DF	1	1	7 July 2003	Micronesia	7 July 2003	Micronesia	
Kialou Pouru	DF	1	0	7 July 2003	Micronesia	7 July 2003	Micronesia	
Godfrey Baniau	GK	1	0	19 May 2004	Samoa	19 May 2004	Samoa	
Spencer Marnhi	FW	1	0	19 May 2004	Samoa	19 May 2004	Samoa	
Brian Tuhiana	DF	1	0	19 May 2004	Samoa	19 May 2004	Samoa	
Tonga Esira	FW	1	0	27 August 2011	Cook Islands	27 August 2011	Cook Islands	
Vanya Malagian	MF	1	0	6 September 2014	Singapore	6 September 2014	Singapore	
Brad McDonald	DF	1	0	6 September 2014	Singapore	6 September 2014	Singapore	
George Slefendorfas	FW	1	0	6 September 2014	Singapore	6 September 2014	Singapore	
Albert Mesulam	GK	1	0	12 October 2014	Philippines	12 October 2014	Philippines	
Rodney Mobiha	MF	1	0	12 October 2014	Philippines	12 October 2014	Philippines	
Kusuga Komolong	GK	1	0	23 March 2017	Tahiti	23 March 2017	Tahiti	
Donovan Murray	MF	1	0	9 June 2017	Solomon Islands	9 June 2017	Solomon Islands	
Alex Kamen	FW	1	0	18 July 2019	Tonga	18 July 2019	Tonga	
Ishmael Pole	GK	1	0	18 July 2019	Tonga	18 July 2019	Tonga	
Shane Sakael	DF	1	0	18 July 2019	Tonga	18 July 2019	Tonga	
Langarap Samol	DF	1	0	18 July 2019	Tonga	18 July 2019	Tonga	
Gregory Togubai	MF	1	0	18 July 2019	Tonga	18 July 2019	Tonga	
Bruce Tiampo	MF	1	0	27 September 2022	Fiji	27 September 2022	Fiji	
