= Nigel Dabinyaba =

Papua New Guinean footballer (born 1992)

Personal information
- Date of birth: 26 October 1992 (age 34)
- Place of birth: Lae, Papua New Guinea
- Height: 1.82 m (6 ft 0 in)
- Position: Forward

Team information
- Current team: Lae City
- Number: 9

Senior career*
Years	Team	Apps	(Gls)
2009–2010	Gigira Laitepo Morobe		
2010–2011	Besta PNG United		
2011–2014	Hekari United		
2014–2016	Lae City		(11)
2016	Western Pride	2	(1)
2016	Canterbury United	2	(0)
2017–2018	Penang FA	18	(3)
2018–	Lae City		(9)
2018	Hamilton Wanderers		
2019	Malaita Kingz		

International career
2011	Papua New Guinea U20	3	(2)
2012	Papua New Guinea U23	4	(1)
2014–	Papua New Guinea	19	(11)
Medal record
Men's football
Representing Papua New Guinea
OFC Nations Cup
Runner-up	2016 Papua New Guinea
MSG Prime Minister's Cup
Winner	2022 Vanuatu
Runner-up	2025 Papua New Guinea
- * Club domestic league appearances and goals

Nigel Dabinyaba (born 26 October 1992), sometimes spelt Nigel Dabingyaba, is a Papua New Guinean international footballer who plays as a forward for Lae City FC in the Papua New Guinea National Soccer League, as well as the Papua New Guinea national team. Besides Papua New Guinea, he has played in New Zealand and Malaysia.

He has won seven National Soccer League titles, including three with Hekari United and four with Lae City FC. Internationally, he has earned 18 caps and scored 8 goals since his debut in 2014.

== Early life ==
Dabinyaba was born in Lae, and attended Bugandi High School.

== Club career ==
He is just 18 and his discipline, commitment and attitude towards training is like a veteran or a senior player [...] [the coach] always banks on him.

— Morobe FC club manager Stanley Khanna

=== Domestic beginnings ===
Aged 18, Dabinyaba played for Gigira Laitepo Morobe in the 2009–10 Papua New Guinea National Soccer League. He had been rejected by Besta PNG United ahead of the season, but was described as 'one of the most consistent players in the team' by manager Stanley Khanna. The side reached the Grand Final of the competition, before being beaten 5–0 by Hekari United.

Dabinyaba was recruited by Besta PNG United, the PNGFA-sanctioned development team, ahead of the 2010–11 season, with the side finishing fourth in the regular season table. Dabinyaba was then selected to represent the Lae Football Association in the 2011 Besta Cup, which the side went on to win.

=== Hekari United ===
Ahead of the 2011–12 season, Dabinyaba was recruited by champions Hekari United. As well as competing domestically, Dabinyaba also played in the 2011–12 OFC Champions League, where the club finished second in Group B, narrowly missing out on a final berth behind eventual champions Auckland City. However, he was able to pick up his first domestic national trophy after helping Hekari to the NSL title. Dabinyaba once again represented Lae in the 2012 Besta Cup, scoring two goals in the final against Bougainville in a 7–0 thrashing.

On 27 April 2013, Dabinyaba scored his first goal in continental competition, helping the side to a 2–1 victory over Solomon Warriors in the final group match of the 2012–13 OFC Champions League, to end what was otherwise a disappointing campaign. However, Dabinyaba did help Hekari to the 2013 National Soccer League title, scoring a goal in the 3–0 victory over FC Port Moresby in the Grand Final.

Dabinyaba was retained ahead of the 2014 season, and once again scored in the 2013–14 OFC Champions League campaign, opening the scoring against AS Magenta in the club's second fixture. The side finished bottom of the group, but won another domestic title, with Dabinyaba scoring the opening goal in the 3–0 victory over Lae FC, before the match was abandoned on 70 minutes.

=== Lae City ===
Ahead of the 2015 season, Dabinyaba, alongside teammate and fellow Lae local Raymond Gunemba, moved to new side Lae City Dwellers, a team more local to him, but Lae lost 3–0 to his former club in their first meeting on 31 January 2015, and again in the reverse fixture in Port Moresby, despite a Dabinyaba goal. However, the club reached the Grand Final where they faced Madang FC, winning 5–1, with Dabinyaba scoring the club's second goal.

Dabinyaba was offered a move to New Zealand side Kapiti Coast after the 2015 season, but was unable to make the move due to visa problems.

The 2015–16 season saw Lae City make their continental debut in the 2016 OFC Champions League, and Dabinyaba scored his second continental goal in a 5–4 defeat to Solomon Warriors on 17 April 2016. Domestically, Dabinyaba scored four goals in the club's opening fixture against Goroka Gosiha, Despite coming second behind Hekari United in the race for the Minor Premiership, Lae City defeated Hekari 2–0 in the Grand Final, allowing Dabinyaba to pick up his fifth straight domestic league winner's medal.

=== Overseas contracts ===
Following his performance at the 2016 OFC Nations Cup, Dabinyaba was signed by Western Pride of the NPL Queensland in Australia on a short-term deal. At the time of his debut, Dabinyaba was the only current full international to play in the league and only the second capped international to play for the club. He made his debut for the club on 6 August 2016, scoring in a victory against Moreton Bay United FC. The season ended shortly afterwards, and Dabinyaba returned home.

In September 2016, it was announced that Dabinyaba would be moving to New Zealand to join Canterbury United of the Stirling Sports Premiership. After a long pursuit of the player, he was officially announced in November. He made two league appearances for the club during his short stay.

In December 2016 it was announced that Dabinyaba was trialing with Penang FA of the Malaysia Premier League. His signing was announced along with the signings of three other players the following month. Dabinyaba was handed the club's number 10 shirt. Dabinyaba remained with the club for a single season, making 18 appearances and scoring 3 goals.

=== Return to Lae City ===
Dabinyaba returned to Toti City Dwellers for the 2018 Papua New Guinea National Soccer League, helping the club to a fourth title and his sixth. He also scored three times in the club's 2018 OFC Champions League campaign – twice in the 7–2 victory over Tupapa, and once in a 4–1 defeat to Nalkutan, before the club was resoundingly beaten 11–0 by eventual winners Team Wellington in the quarter-finals.

In May 2018, it was announced that Dabinyaba would join Hamilton Wanderers AFC, a top-flight club in New Zealand. However, he returned to Lae ahead of the new season in Papua New Guinea.

Dabinyaba scored four goals for Lae in their 2019 OFC Champions League campaign, including one in the 1–1 draw with eventual champions Hienghene Sport. The club reached the quarter-finals before losing to Auckland City. Domestically, Dabinyaba scored several goals throughout the 2019 season to help the club to top spot in the Northern Conference, before scoring two in the semi-final against Morobe United and converting his penalty in the Grand Final shoot-out to earn a seventh domestic title for himself.

In October 2019, Dabinyaba joined Solomon Islands club Malaita Kingz on a short-term basis for the second half of the domestic season. He rejoined Lae City following the start of the 2019–20 Papua New Guinea National Soccer League.

== International career ==
=== U20s ===
Dabinyaba made three appearances for the U20s national team at the 2011 OFC U-20 Championship. He played in all three of the nation's group games, scoring twice: once in the 5–1 defeat of American Samoa, and once in the 5–2 defeat to Vanuatu.

=== U23s ===
In March 2012, Dabinyaba was part of the national U23s side during qualifying for the 2012 Olympic Games. Dabinyaba played in all four of the nation's games, scoring in the 3–0 victory against Tonga.

=== Senior squad ===
Dabinyaba was called up to the senior international squad in September 2014 for a friendly against Singapore, but he would not make his competitive debut until the 2016 OFC Nations Cup, with the 1–1 against New Caledonia being his third international cap overall. He scored his first two senior international goals during the 8–0 victory over Samoa, eventually scoring three across the whole tournament. Papua New Guinea went on to be the runners-up after losing on penalties in the final to New Zealand.

In November 2016, Dabinyaba scored his fourth and fifth international goals in friendlies against Iran and Malaysia, the latter game allowing him to pick up his tenth senior cap.

Dabinyaba was part of the nation's unsuccessful 2018 FIFA World Cup Qualifying campaign, playing in three of the four fixtures and scoring once, having been suspended for the first game against the Solomon Islands.

Dabinyaba played all five of Papua New Guinea's matches at the 2019 Pacific Games, scoring twice, against Samoa and Tonga. Papua New Guinea went on to finish fourth.

== Career statistics ==
As of 7 October 2022

Appearances and goals by national team and year
National team	Year	Apps	Goals
Papua New Guinea	2014	1	0
Papua New Guinea	2016	9	5
Papua New Guinea	2017	3	1
Papua New Guinea	2019	5	2
Papua New Guinea	2022	1	3
Total		19	11

As of 30 September 2022
Scores and results list Papua New Guinea's goal tally first, score column indicates score after each Dabinyaba goal.

List of international goals scored by Nigel Dabinyaba
No.	Date	Venue	Opponent	Score	Result	Competition
1	5 June 2016	Sir John Guise Stadium, Port Moresby, Papua New Guinea	Samoa	4–0	8–0	2016 OFC Nations Cup
2	5 June 2016	Sir John Guise Stadium, Port Moresby, Papua New Guinea	Samoa	7–0	8–0	2016 OFC Nations Cup
3	8 June 2016	Sir John Guise Stadium, Port Moresby, Papua New Guinea	Solomon Islands	2–1	2–1	2016 OFC Nations Cup
4	10 November 2016	Shah Alam Stadium, Shah Alam, Malaysia	Iran	1–2	1–8	Friendly
5	14 November 2016	Shah Alam Stadium, Shah Alam, Malaysia	Malaysia	1–0	1–2	Friendly
6	23 March 2017	Sir John Guise Stadium, Port Moresby, Papua New Guinea	Tahiti	1–0	1–3	2018 FIFA World Cup qualification
7	8 July 2019	National Soccer Stadium, Apia, Samoa	Samoa	4–0	6–0	2019 Pacific Games
8	18 July 2019	National Soccer Stadium, Apia, Samoa	Tonga	2–0	8–0	2019 Pacific Games
9	27 September 2022	Luganville Soccer Stadium, Luganville, Vanuatu	Fiji	1–0	1–0	2022 MSG Prime Minister's Cup
10	30 September 2022	Luganville Soccer Stadium, Luganville, Vanuatu	Vanuatu	1–2	2–2	2022 MSG Prime Minister's Cup
11	30 September 2022	Luganville Soccer Stadium, Luganville, Vanuatu	Vanuatu	2–2	2–2	2022 MSG Prime Minister's Cup

== Honours ==
Hekari United

- Papua New Guinea National Soccer League: 2011–12, 2013, 2014

Lae City

- Papua New Guinea National Soccer League: 2015, 2015–16, 2018, 2019

Papua New Guinea

- OFC Nations Cup: runner-up, 2016
- MSG Prime Minister's Cup: 2022; runner-up, 2025
