= List of soccer clubs in Papua New Guinea =

This is a list of soccer clubs in Papua New Guinea.

== Soccer clubs in Papua New Guinea ==
- Besta PNG United
- Eastern Stars FC (Milne Bay)
- Gelle Hills United (Port Moresby)
- Gigira Laitepo Morobe (Lae)
- Hekari United FC (Port Moresby)
- Madang Niupetro Fox (Madang)
- NC Civil Works Oro FC
- Rapatona FC (Port Moresby)
- Petro Souths FC (Mendi)
- Unitech FC (Lae)
- University Inter FC (Port Moresby)
- Star Mountain F.C. (Tabubil)
