= 2013 Papua New Guinea National Soccer League =

Papua New Guinea National Soccer League
- Season: 2013
- Dates: 2 February – 1 June 2013
- Champions: Hekari United (7th title)
- 2013–14 OFC Champions League: Hekari United

The 2013 Papua New Guinea National Soccer League season, known as the Telikom NSL Cup for sponsorship reasons, was the seventh edition of Papua New Guinea National Soccer League.

The title was won by Hekari United, who defeated FC Port Moresby in the Grand Final 3–0 to win their seventh consecutive title.

== Teams ==
Only four sides returned from the previous season, with Tukoko University, Bulolo United and Petro Souths withdrawing from the competition. Hekari United and Gigira Laitepo Morobe returned for their seventh successive seasons, while Eastern Stars returned for their fifth and Besta PNG United for their fourth. Welgris Highlanders rejoined the league after a three-year absence, while there were debuts for Oro FC, WNB Tavur and FC Port Moresby.

Papua New Guinea National Soccer League 2013
Team	Previous best	Other honours
Hekari United	2006–12: Champions (6x)	2009–10 OFC Champions League: Champions 2007 Port Moresby Premier League: Champions
Eastern Stars F.C.	2010–11, 2011–12: Runners-Up	None
Gigira Laitepo Morobe F.C.	2009–10: Runners-Up	1998 National Club Championship: Runners-Up 2001, 2005 Lae Regional Championship: Champions
Besta PNG United	2011–12: 3rd	None
Welgris Highlanders	2008–09: 4th	2005 National Club Championship: 3rd 2005 Highlands Regional Championship: Champions
F.C. Port Moresby	N/A	None
NC Civil Works Oro F.C.	N/A	None
West New Britain Tavur	N/A	None

== Format ==
The league reverted to the traditional 'home and away' fixtures after the previous season had seen each side play each other three times. The team at the top of the league after all matches were played was crowned 'Minor Premiers' and secured qualification for the 2013–14 OFC Champions League. At the end of the regular season, the top four teams advanced to a knockout competition, the winners of which were crowned Champions.

== Summary ==
The season kick-off was delayed several times due to late registrations leading to a lack of sufficient clubs. By late December 2012, only four teams had completed the registration process: current champions Hekari United, Besta United PNG, Welgris Highlanders and West New Britain Tavur. FC Port Moresby, joined in early January. At this stage, the NSL had decided to go ahead with the league with just six teams, the lowest since the inaugural season, but two sides, Morobe FC and Oro FC, submitted their registration documents on the same day, leaving the organisers with a dilemma. It was only on 29 January that the teams were confirmed, over two months later than usual, with the addition of Eastern Stars creating an eight-team league for the season ahead.

The fixtures throughout the season were a little irregular, especially for WNB Tavur, who were based in the New Guinea islands, and thus incurred higher travel costs than most other teams. This meant that the side organised away matches in 'clumps' to avoid back-and-forth travel costs. As a result, they often played their matches outside of the usual weekend schedule.

By the time WNB Tavur played their first match on 13 February, most other sides had already played two. Hekari and Besta PNG led the table with two wins from two, with Hekari top on goal difference thanks mainly to a 6–0 away win at Welgris Highlanders on the second weekend of the season. Tavur ended up drawing with Eastern Stars in their opening fixture, before playing back-to-back away matches on 20, 23 and 28 February to catch up to the rest of the schedule – all three of which they lost. By the end of February, after four fixtures played, Hekari led the table with four wins from four ahead of Besta PNG United – who had dropped points after a 1–1 draw with FC Port Moresby on match-day four – on ten.

By mid-March it had become clear that it would be a two-horse race for the title, with Hekari having won six out of six, and Besta managing to keep pace just two points behind them after six games – six clear of FC Port Moresby in third place. Moresby's challenge suffered another dent the following week when they were awarded a 3–0 away defeat against WNB Tavur, as they were unable to make the journey to the New Guinea islands. This would happen again to Welgris Highlanders later in the season. On 23 March, however, Moresby became the first club to take points off Hekari after a 1–1 draw in Port Moresby. This result put Hekari three points clear of Besta PNG at the top, having played a game more. On 30 March, FC Port Moresby defeated Gigira Laitepo Morobe 1–0 to bring them level on points with Morobe in third place.

On 7 April, WNB Tavur recorded their only legitimate victory of the season, defeating Besta PNG United 2–1 in a match which would have put Besta top of the league, had they won it – Hekari were away taking part in the OFC Champions League and had three consecutive away fixtures in their group, which disrupted their NSL fixture scheduling. The following week, Besta would lose again, this time to FC Port Moresby, 3–0, again spurning the chance to go top, while inviting pressure from clubs behind them. On 20 April, Besta finally went top after a 5–1 win over Gigira Laitepo Morobe, while FC Port Moresby's 4–3 victory over Welgris Highlanders took them within one point of Hekari, having played four games more.

Hekari returned to Papua New Guinea in late April, with one home fixture in the group stages of the OFC Champions League remaining, having already been eliminated. On 24 April, they defeated Oro FC 1–0 to return to the top of the league, before Besta's 2–2 draw with Eastern Stars left them one point ahead of Hekari with two games to play – both of them against Hekari. Hekari, meanwhile, had five fixtures remaining. After Hekari beat Eastern Stars 9–1 midweek, Besta held Hekari to a 2–2 draw on the 'final day' of fixtures on 4 May, meaning they went into their final fixture needing to beat Hekari, and to hope that Hekari would lose the rest of their rescheduled fixtures, in order to claim the Minor Premiership. However, a fired-up Hekari thrashed Besta 5–0 on 8 May, securing the Minor Premiership, before winning all of their remaining fixtures to finish the season unbeaten. Hekari and Besta entered the playoffs alongside FC Port Moresby and fourth-placed Gigira Laitepo Morobe.

In the playoffs, Hekari eased past Morobe 3–0 to reach the final, while a disappointing Besta lost 2–0 against FC Port Moresby, allowing the debutants to enter the Grand Final at the first time of asking. Besta claimed third-place with a 3–2 win over Morobe in the third-place playoff, but Hekari stole the headlines again on 1 June with their seventh consecutive title, beating Port Moresby 3–0 with goals from Nigel Dabinyaba, Daniel Joe and a penalty from Ericson Komeng.

== Regular season ==
Pos	Team	Pld	W	D	L	GF	GA	GD	Pts	Qualification
1	Hekari United (C)	14	12	2	0	47	11	+36	38	Qualified for the 2013–14 OFC Champions League Group Stage
2	Besta PNG United	14	8	3	3	27	20	+7	27	Qualified for the Championship Playoff
3	FC Port Moresby	14	7	4	3	32	15	+17	25	Qualified for the Championship Playoff
4	Gigira Laitepo Morobe FC	14	7	2	5	24	20	+4	23	Qualified for the Championship Playoff
5	NC Civil Works Oro FC	14	4	2	8	10	22	−12	14	
6	Eastern Stars FC	14	2	7	5	15	31	−16	13	
7	WNB Tavur	14	3	1	10	17	31	−14	10	
8	Welgris Highlanders	14	1	3	10	15	37	−22	6	

Source: Weltfussballarchiv
Rules for classification: 1) points; 2) goal difference; 3) number of goals scored.
(C) Champions

== Championship playoff ==
Semi-finals
Hekari United	3
Gigira Laitepo Morobe	0
Besta PNG United	0
FC Port Moresby	2

Final
Hekari United	3
FC Port Moresby	0
Third place
Gigira Laitepo Morobe	2
Besta PNG United	3

=== Semi-finals ===
25 May 2013

Hekari United	3–0	Gigira Laitepo Morobe
Raymond Gunemba 1', 17' (?)

25 May 2013

Besta PNG United	0–2	FC Port Moresby
		Max Senyum; 53' Vanya Malagia

=== Third-place playoff ===
1 June 2013

Gigira Laitepo Morobe	2–3	Besta PNG United
Jeremy Yasasa; John Joe		Cooper Ipako

Sir Ignatius Kilage Stadium, Port Moresby

=== Final ===
1 June 2013

Hekari United	3–0	FC Port Moresby
Nigel Dabinyaba; Ericson Komeng (pen.); Daniel Joe

Sir John Guise Stadium, Port Moresby
