= Gigira Amoana F.C. =

Association football club in Papua New Guinea

Gigira Amoana
- Full name: Gigira Amoana Koupa Football Club
- Founded: 2015
- Chairman: Libe Parindali
- Manager: David Passam
- League: National Premier League
- 2018: Southern Conference: 4th

Gigira Amoana FC, often referred to as Amoana Koupa FC, formerly known as Gigira Laitepo United FC, was a semi-professional association football club based in Koupa, Papua New Guinea, founded in 2015.

The side has taken part in one edition of the Papua New Guinea National Soccer League and two editions of the now-defunct Papua New Guinea National Premier League, having achieved relatively little success in either.

== History ==
From 2008–2014, the company Gigira Laitepo, a daughter company of Hides Gas Development Company, sponsored Morobe FC, until they withdrew their sponsorship ahead of the 2015 Papua New Guinea National Soccer League season.

Ahead of the 2015–16 season, a side with the name of Gigira Laitepo United was accepted into the Southern Conference – a new franchise with a similar name to the Morobe franchise that took part in that season's Northern Conference. In January 2016, the side accepted sponsorship from Kumul Petroleum Holdings.

The side picked up their first competitive victory on 29 November 2015 with a 3–2 victory over FC Port Moresby. That would be their only victory in the first half of the season, however, before the club signed Solomon Islander Patrick Miniti Jr. to boost their hopes for the second half of the season. After a second victory against PS Huawei, the side were still in contention for playoff qualification with two matches to go, but they were unable to capitalise on this chance and eventually finished 5th out of six teams.

The club were one of several franchises to break away from the Papua New Guinea Football Association in 2017, and this saw the side take part in the 2017 edition of the new National Premier League under a new name – Gigira Amoana. The side opened their campaign in the Southern Conference with an 11–0 thrashing of Admiralty FC on 22 April 2017, but the side failed to win any of their first round fixtures against the rest of the division, with their second win of the season coming against Admiralty again on 27 May. The side avoided finishing at the bottom of the conference with a final-day victory – their third of the season – over Rapatona, who finished beneath them.

The side were also selected to take part in the 2018 season of the NPL, in which they were once again drawn in the Southern Conference. They finished 4th out of 4, after drawing one match and losing the remaining two.

== Domestic record ==
=== National competitions ===
- Papua New Guinea National Soccer League
  - 2015–16: Southern Conference: 5th
- Papua New Guinea National Premier League
  - 2017: Southern Conference: 5th
  - 2018: Southern Conference: 4th
