= 2024 Papua New Guinea Premier Soccer League =

Papua New Guinea Premier Soccer League
- Season: 2024
- Dates: 6 July – 2 November
- Champions: Hekari United
- Premiers: Hekari United
- Champions League: Hekari United
- Matches: 60
- Goals: 183 (3.05 per match)
- Best Player: Judah Asar
- Top goalscorer: Logan Biwa (11 goals)
- Best goalkeeper: Dave Tomare
- Biggest home win: 9 goals Hekari United 9–0 Lae City Dwellers (August 10)
- Biggest away win: 5 goals Admiralty Islands 0–5 Morobe Wawens (October 13)
- Highest scoring: 9 goals Lae City Dwellers 5–4 Admiralty Islands (July 29); Hekari United 9–0 Lae City Dwellers (August 10)
- Longest winning run: 8 matches Hekari United (July 27 – September 28)
- Longest unbeaten run: 13 matches Hekari United (July 7 – October 12)
- Longest winless run: 5 matches Admiralty Islands (July 7 – August 4); Lae City Dwellers (August 4 – September 14)
- Longest losing run: 4 matches Morobe Wawens (July 6 – July 27); Lae City Dwellers (August 4 – August 31); Lae City (September 14 – October 5)
- All statistics correct as of 2 November 2024.

The 2024 Papua New Guinea Premier Soccer League was the 2nd season of the Premier Soccer League and the 16th edition of top-tier soccer in Papua New Guinea overall. The league began on 6 July 2024 with 8 teams, after being postponed for a planned March to July season.

Hekari United are the defending champions, having won the inaugural Premier Soccer League title with a 1–0 victory over Lae City Dwellers in the 2022–23 edition, ending their nine-year title drought.

== Teams ==
As early as January 2024, the Papua New Guinea Football Association has sent notice of Expressions of Interest to the eight PSL clubs from the previous season. The teams were Gulf Isou, Hekari United, Lae City, Lae City Dwellers, Madang FC, Morobe Wawens, Port Moresby Strikers, and United Highlands FC.

On 2 July 2024, the PNGFA has confirmed on its Facebook page the 8 teams that will compete for the season, including Round 1 matchups. After a nine-year absence, Admiralty Islands return to top flight football.

Papua New Guinea Premier Soccer League 2024
Team	Region	Previous Best	Other Honours	Stadium	Capacity
Admiralty Islands					
Gulf Komara	Southern	2015–16: Southern Conference: 4th 2019–20: 4th	2018 National Premier League: Champions		
Hekari United	Southern	2006–14, 2022–23: Champions (9x)	2009–10 OFC Champions League: Champions 2017 National Premier League: Champions; 2007 Port Moresby Premier League: Champions	PNG Football Stadium	14,800
Lae City	Northern	2015–19: Champions (5x)	2018, 2019 OFC Champions League: Quarter-Finalists	Sir Ignatius Kilage Stadium	1,500
Lae City Dwellers		2022–23: Runners-up			
Morobe Wawens	Northern	2018: 3rd	None	Sir Ignatius Kilage Stadium	1,500
Port Moresby Strikers (name changed from Southern Strikers)	Southern	2018: 5th	None		
United Highlands FC					

== Regular season ==
=== League table ===
Pos	Team	Pld	W	D	L	GF	GA	GD	Pts	Qualification or relegation
1	Hekari United (C)	14	11	2	1	35	7	+28	35	Qualification to Champions League group stage and Playoffs
2	Gulf Komara	14	6	5	3	23	17	+6	23	Qualification to Playoffs
3	Port Moresby Strikers	14	6	4	4	16	16	0	22	Qualification to Playoffs
4	Lae City	14	5	3	6	19	19	0	18	Qualification to Playoffs
5	Morobe Wawens	14	4	5	5	20	21	−1	17	
6	United Highlands	14	5	2	7	22	24	−2	17	
7	Lae City Dwellers	14	4	2	8	21	33	−12	14	
8	Admiralty Islands	14	3	1	10	13	32	−19	10	

Source: RSSSF
Rules for classification: 1) points; 2) goal difference
(C) Champions

== Results ==
Home \ Away	ADM	GUK	HEK	LAE	LCD	MOW	PMS	UHI
Admiralty Islands	—	1–1	0–2	3–1	0–5	0–5	1–2	1–0
Gulf Komara	3–0	—	1–2	2–1	2–0	2–2	1–2	1–1
Hekari United	2–0	3–1	—	1–2	9–0	3–0	2–0	3–2
Lae City	2–0	1–2	0–0	—	1–0	2–2	3–1	1–2
Lae City Dwellers	5–4	1–1	1–4	1–2	—	2–1	0–1	1–3
Morobe Wawens	0–2	1–2	0–0	3–2	0–0	—	3–2	2–4
Port Moresby Strikers	2–1	1–1	0–2	0–0	2–0	0–0	—	2–2
United Highlands	2–0	1–3	0–2	2–1	3–5	0–1	0–1	—

Source: RSSSF
Legend: Blue = home team win; Yellow = draw; Red = away team win.

=== Results by round ===
Team ╲ Round	1	2	3	4	5	6	7	8	9	10	11	12	13	14
Admiralty Islands	L	D	L	L	L	W	W	L	L	L	W	L	L	L
Gulf Komara	W	D	W	W	L	D	W	D	W	L	L	W	D	D
Hekari United	W	W	D	W	W	W	W	W	W	W	W	D	W	L
Lae City	W	L	D	D	W	D	L	W	L	L	L	L	W	W
Lae City Dwellers	L	W	L	W	L	L	L	L	D	W	W	L	L	D
Morobe Wawens	L	L	L	L	W	D	L	D	D	W	D	D	W	W
Port Moresby Strikers	D	L	W	D	L	D	W	W	L	W	D	W	L	W
United Highlands	D	W	W	L	W	L	L	L	W	L	L	W	D	L

Source: RSSSF
W = Win; D = Draw; L = Loss

=== Positions by round ===
Team ╲ Round	1	2	3	4	5	6	7	8	9	10	11	12	13	14
Hekari United	1	1	1	1	1	1	1	1	1	1	1	1	1	1
Gulf Komara	2	2	2	2	2	2	2	2	2	2	2	2	2	2
Port Moresby Strikers	4	7	5	6	6	5	5	4	5	3	3	3	3	3
Lae City	3	4	4	5	4	4	4	3	4	5	6	6	5	4
Morobe Wawens	6	8	8	8	7	8	8	8	8	7	7	7	6	5
United Highlands	5	3	3	3	3	3	3	5	3	4	4	4	4	6
Lae City Dwellers	7	5	6	4	5	6	7	7	7	6	5	5	7	7
Admiralty Islands	8	6	7	7	8	7	6	6	6	8	8	8	8	8

Qualification to the OFC Champions League national play-offs and PSL Playoffs
Qualification to the PSL Playoffs

Source: RSSSF

== Playoffs ==
Semi-finals
October 26 – Port Moresby
Hekari United	3
Lae City	0
October 26 – Port Moresby
Gulf Komara	2
Port Moresby Strikers	1

Final
November 2 – Port Moresby
Hekari United	2
Gulf Komara	1
Third place match
November 2 – Port Moresby
Port Moresby Strikers	2
Lae City	3

=== Semi-finals ===
26 October 2024
13:00 UTC+10:00

Hekari United	3–0	Lae City

PNG Football Stadium, Port Moresby
26 October 2024
16:00 UTC+10:00

Gulf Komara	2–1	Port Moresby Strikers

PNG Football Stadium, Port Moresby

=== Third-place playoff ===
2 November 2024
13:00 UTC+10:00

Port Moresby Strikers	2–3 (a.e.t.)	Lae City
? ?' ? ?'	The National	? ?' ? ?' ? ?'

PNG Football Stadium, Port Moresby

=== Final ===
2 November 2024
16:00 UTC+10:00

Hekari United	2–1	Gulf Komara
Kepo 36'; Joe ?'	The National	? ?'

PNG Football Stadium, Port Moresby
Attendance: 754

== Season statistics ==
=== Top scorers ===
As of 29 September 2024

Rank	Player	Club	Goals
1	Logan Biwa	United Highlands	10
2	(Papua New Guinea) Ferdahlas Namuesh	Morobe Wawens	7
3	(Papua New Guinea) Matu Ben	Lae City Dwellers	5
3	(Papua New Guinea) Ati Kepo	Hekari United	5
3	Rex Naime	Hekari United	5

=== Most assists ===
As of 5 July 2024

Rank	Player	Club	Assists
1			

=== Clean sheets ===
As of 20 October 2024

Rank	Player	Club	Clean sheets
1		Hekari United	9
2		Morobe Wawens	5
2		Port Moresby Strikers	5
4		Lae City	4
5		Admiralty Islands	2
5		Gulf Komara	2
5		Lae City Dwellers	2
8		United Highlands	1

=== Hat-tricks ===
As of 29 July 2024

Player	For	Against	Result	Date
Logan Biwa	United Highlands	Morobe Wawens	4–2 (A)	22 July 2024
(Papua New Guinea) Matu Ben	Lae City Dwellers	Admiralty Islands	5–4 (H)	29 July 2024

== Attendances ==
The league average was 179:

#	Club	Average
1	Hekari United	312
2	Lae City	232
3	Port Moresby Strikers	180
4	Gulf Komara	161
5	Admiralty	150
6	Lae City Dwellers	145
7	United Highlands	135
8	Morobe Wawens	119
