= 2014 Papua New Guinea National Soccer League =

Papua New Guinea National Soccer League
- Season: 2014
- Dates: 8 February – 24 May 2014
- Champions: Hekari United (8th title)
- 2014–15 OFC Champions League: Hekari United

The 2014 Papua New Guinea National Soccer League season, known as the Telikom NSL Cup for sponsorship reasons, was the eighth edition of the Papua New Guinea National Soccer League.

The title was won by Hekari United, who won their eighth and, to date, final title, after going unbeaten throughout the season and being awarded the title in the final after the match against Lae FC was abandoned due to crowd violence.

== Teams ==
There were seven teams in the competition, one fewer than the previous season. The previous season's runners-up FC Port Moresby were excluded from the competition after failing to submit the necessary paperwork on time, with the club taking the PNGFA and the NSL to court over the whole procedure. Last year's debutants WNB Tavur were also excluded, while Welgris Highlanders withdrew. They were replaced by Admiralty FC from Manus Province, and Lae FC.

Papua New Guinea National Soccer League 2014
Team	Previous best	Other honours
Hekari United	2006–13: Champions (7x)	2009–10 OFC Champions League: Champions 2007 Port Moresby Premier League: Champions
Eastern Stars F.C.	2010–11, 2011–12: Runners-Up	None
Gigira Laitepo Morobe F.C.	2009–10: Runners-Up	1998 National Club Championship: Runners-Up 2001, 2005 Lae Regional Championship: Champions
Besta PNG United	2011–12, 2013: 3rd	None
Oro F.C.	2013: 5th	None
Lae F.C.	N/A	None
Admiralty F.C.	N/A	None

== Format ==
Seven teams played in the league. During the regular season, teams played home and away, and the team at the top of the league after all matches were played was crowned 'Minor Premiers' and secured qualification for the 2014–15 OFC Champions League. At the end of the regular season, the top four teams advanced to a knockout competition, the winners of which were crowned Champions.

== Summary ==
Due to FC Port Moresby's ongoing court case, the start of the season was delayed three times before eventually kicking off on 8 February 2014.

Morobe FC went top of the league after the opening weekend, having secured a 4–0 win over Lae FC while Hekari United could only draw with Eastern Stars. Two straight wins for Hekari propelled them to the top by the end of February, although Morobe were just a point behind with a game in hand.

March saw Hekari stretch their lead with three wins and two draws over five weekends giving them 18 points by the end of the month. Morobe maintained their position in second, although found themselves six points behind Hekari – with whom they had played out a 2–2 draw on 22 March – thanks to a 0–2 slip up against Oro FC on 8 March. Oro themselves sat third, level on points with Lae FC despite twice losing to the side from Lae during the course of the month. Admiralty FC and Besta PNG United sat four points off playoff qualification, with Eastern Stars last with four points, their only win to date a 2–1 victory over Lae.

With Hekari away at the start of April for the 2013–14 OFC Champions League group stage, the remaining teams had a chance to put pressure on the defending champions. However, Morobe could only draw both their games against Eastern Stars, with both matches ending 2–2. Oro drew level with Morobe after a win and a draw against Besta PNG United, while Lae's first match against Admiralty was abandoned at 89 minutes and replayed later once Hekari had already claimed the Minor Premiership. Lae went on to beat Admiralty 3–2 at home the following weekend.

Hekari returned from continental action, therefore, still four points clear at the top, and defeated Oro 5–0 on their return. The following weekend, Hekari claimed the Minor Premiership after a win against Lae FC combined with Morobe's 1–0 loss against Oro, giving them an unassailable lead with two fixtures to play. Morobe eventually slumped to 4th after Lae and Oro won all their remaining fixtures, and Morobe fell 3–1 to Premiers Hekari on the final day.

In the playoffs, Hekari reached their eighth consecutive final after a 2–0 victory against Morobe FC, while Lae FC made the final in their debut season with a battling 3–2 win over Oro FC. Morobe beat Oro after extra time in the third-place match, while the Grand Final, on 24 May 2014, was rife with incident. With Hekari leading 3–0 after 70 minutes, several Lae FC fans outside the arena fence started throwing stones at the Hekari United players, with Hekari goalkeeper Godfrey Baniau being hit several times. The match was abandoned, and Hekari were awarded the title after having the better regular season record.

== Regular season ==
Pos	Team	Pld	W	D	L	GF	GA	GD	Pts	Qualification
1	Hekari United (C)	12	9	3	0	39	7	+32	30	Qualified for the 2014–15 OFC Champions League Group Stage
2	Lae FC	12	7	1	4	20	18	+2	22	Qualified for the Championship Playoff
3	Oro FC	12	6	2	4	15	18	−3	20	Qualified for the Championship Playoff
4	Gigira Laitepo Morobe FC	12	4	5	3	22	17	+5	17	Qualified for the Championship Playoff
5	Besta PNG United	12	3	1	8	15	24	−9	10	
6	Admiralty FC	12	2	4	6	16	26	−10	10	
7	Eastern Stars FC	12	1	4	7	12	29	−17	7	

Source: Weltfussballarchiv
Rules for classification: 1) points; 2) goal difference; 3) number of goals scored.
(C) Champions

== Championship playoff ==
Semi-finals
Hekari United	2
Gigira Laitepo Morobe FC	0
Oro FC	2
Lae FC	3

Final
Hekari United	3
Lae FC	0
Third place
Gigira Laitepo Morobe FC	W
Oro FC	L

=== Semi-finals ===
17 May 2014

Hekari United	2–0	Gigira Laitepo Morobe
Joachim Waroi 54'; Raymond Gunemba 82'

Sir Ignatius Kilage Stadium, Lae
17 May 2014

Oro FC	2–3 (a.e.t.)	Lae FC
Leana Geno; Garry Moka		(pen.) Goroba Tawa; Jacob Max

Sir Ignatius Kilage Stadium, Lae

=== Final ===
24 May 2014

Hekari United	3–0	Lae FC
Nigel Dabinyaba 44'; Nicolas Muri; Raymond Gunemba	Match abandoned after 70 minutes

Sir Ignatius Kilage Stadium, Lae
