= Lae F.C. =

Defunct football club in Papua New Guinea

Lae
- Full name: Lae Football Club
- Founded: 2013; 13 years ago
- Dissolved: 2014; 12 years ago
- Ground: Sir Ignatius Kilage Stadium
- Capacity: 1,500
- Manager: Peter Gunemba
- League: Papua New Guinea National Soccer League
- 2014: 2nd

Lae FC was a semi-professional soccer club founded in 2013 and dissolved in 2014, based in Lae, Papua New Guinea.

The club took part in only one edition of the Papua New Guinea National Soccer League, in 2014, where they finished the regular season in third place before reaching the Grand Final. Against Hekari United, they trailed 0–3 before crowd trouble caused the game to be abandoned after 70 minutes. The club were eventually awarded the runner-up position, as their regular season record was inferior to that of their opponents.

== History ==
In October 2013, it was announced that a new side would be participating in the 2014 Papua New Guinea National Soccer League under the name of Lae FC. The side announced their head coach, Peter Gunemba, in December.

The 2014 season was an excellent debut for the club in general, with the side recovering from a 4–0 opening day defeat to local rivals Morobe FC to eventually finish third in the regular season table behind Hekari United and Oro FC. The side came up against Oro in the semi-final, and in a closely fought clash, Lae came out on top in a 3–2 thriller, and went on to face Hekari in the final. However, with Lae trailing 0–3 to the champions, crowd violence broke out, with stones being thrown at the Hekari goalkeeper, and the match was abandoned with 20 minutes remaining. Hekari were later awarded the championship.

Ahead of the 2015 season, the club were expected to pay a fine for 'bringing the game into disrepute', although it's unclear whether this fine was ever paid. The club was dissolved shortly afterwards, with the manager and several players involved in the creation of a new franchise, Lae City Dwellers, before the new season kicked off.

== Honours ==
=== National Competitions ===
- Papua New Guinea National Soccer League
  - 2014: Runners-up
