= 2025 Papua New Guinea Premier Soccer League =

Papua New Guinea Premier Soccer League
- Season: 2025
- Country: Papua New Guinea
- Teams: 11
- Matches: 112

The 2025 Papua New Guinea Premier Soccer League was the third season of the Papua New Guinea Premier Soccer League, the top tier of soccer in Papua New Guinea, and the season in which Gulf Komara won their first domestic league title.

Hekari United entered the season as defending champions after winning the 2024 title. Eleven clubs contested the regular season, a double round-robin in which each side played the others home and away. Lae City finished top of the table unbeaten on 50 points from 20 matches, ahead of Gulf Komara and Hekari United, who finished level on 40 points. Kula FC, Star Mountain FC and Blue Kumuls United FC were newly promoted to the competition for the season.

In the playoffs, Gulf Komara eliminated Hekari United 3–0 in the semi-finals, while unbeaten regular-season leaders Lae City were beaten on penalties by Morobe Wawens after a 1–1 draw. The third-place play-off was not played after Hekari United, having been told by the PNGFA's own competition department that the fixture was cancelled, did not field a team; Lae City, who had not been informed of the cancellation, were awarded the match by walkover. Gulf Komara went on to win the grand final 3–1 against Morobe Wawens on 14 December 2025 at the PNG Football Stadium, claiming their first title in what was their second consecutive grand-final appearance.

== Background ==
The season was launched on 12 June 2025 at the PNG Football Stadium, with Ok Tedi Mining Limited (OTML) announced as title sponsor — the competition's first sponsorship deal in two years. PNGFA president John Kapi Natto thanked OTML for its support, noting the association had gone without a title sponsor for the previous two seasons. Eleven clubs took part, with Kula FC and Blue Kumuls United making their debuts and Star Mountain FC returning to the competition after an absence.

== Summary ==
Hekari United, aiming for a third straight title, opened the season with a bye, while Blue Kumuls United's debut ended in a 6–0 defeat to Port Moresby Strikers. By round four, Morobe Wawens were preparing to host reigning champions Hekari United, a match they lost 1–0.

Lae City FC and Gulf Komara emerged as Hekari's chief rivals for the title, and in round six, Komara came from a goalless first half to win 2–0 after Hekari captain and goalkeeper Dave Tomare was sent off for a foul inside the box; Danny Vetali converted the resulting penalty before Gani Gapi added a second with a header. Hekari's title defence stalled further in October, when they were held to a goalless draw by Port Moresby Strikers in round 14. Lae City, meanwhile, went the entire 20-match regular season without defeat, finishing top of the table on 50 points.

Round 15 produced the season's only fixture irregularities: Morobe Wawens' match against Hekari United is recorded as a draw, though only the half-time score (1–0 to Wawens) is confirmed, while Star Mountain's meeting with Lae City Dwellers was not played at all. The regular season concluded on 29 November after 22 rounds, with Lae City (50 points), Hekari United (40), Gulf Komara (40) and Morobe Wawens (37) confirmed for the semi-finals.

In the semi-finals on 7 December, Gulf Komara eliminated Hekari United 3–0 through goals from Ezikiel Vela, Iammo Manu and Pala Paul to reach their second consecutive grand final, while unbeaten Lae City were held 1–1 by Morobe Wawens and eliminated on penalties, ending Wawens' eight-year wait for a grand-final appearance.

Finals day on 14 December was overshadowed by the collapse of the third-place play-off. Hekari United had been told by the PNGFA's own competition department that the fixture was cancelled and did not field a team, while Lae City, who had not been informed, arrived in Port Moresby with a full squad and were awarded the match by walkover. PNGFA general secretary Ahmjad Tekwie initially said Hekari would face a "heavy" fine, before an internal investigation concluded that Hekari had in fact complied with competition regulations and had properly communicated its withdrawal, attributing the confusion to an internal administrative oversight; no fine was imposed on the club. Lae City were separately declared minor premiers on the strength of their regular-season table position and were set to represent Papua New Guinea at an OFC club competition in Samoa in 2026.

In the grand final that followed, Gulf Komara beat Morobe Wawens 3–1 to win their first Premier Soccer League title.

== Teams ==
Club	City/province
Admiralty Island FC	Manus Province (plays in Lae)
Blue Kumuls United FC	Port Moresby
FC Morobe Wawens	Lae
Gulf Komara FC	Kerema
Hekari United FC	Port Moresby
Kula FC	Milne Bay Province (plays in Port Moresby)
Lae City FC	Lae
Lae City Dwellers FC	Lae
Port Moresby Strikers FC	Port Moresby
Star Mountain FC	Tabubil
United Highlands FC	Mount Hagen

Table sourced to RSSSF.

== Regular season ==
Pos	Team	Pld	W	D	L	GF	GA	GD	Pts	Qualification
1	Lae City FC	20	15	5	0	49	17	+32	50	Qualified for the playoffs
2	Gulf Komara FC	20	11	7	2	51	19	+32	40	Qualified for the playoffs
3	Hekari United FC	20	12	4	4	34	14	+20	40	Qualified for the playoffs
4	FC Morobe Wawens	20	11	4	5	32	19	+13	37	Qualified for the playoffs
5	Port Moresby Strikers FC	20	8	8	4	38	28	+10	32	
6	Admiralty Island FC	20	9	5	6	33	33	0	32	
7	United Highlands FC	20	7	7	6	29	21	+8	28	
8	Kula FC	20	6	2	12	28	38	−10	20	
9	Lae City Dwellers FC	19	3	1	15	30	46	−16	10 (Note: One match was not played.)	
10	Star Mountain FC	19	2	2	15	20	66	−46	8 (Note: One match was not played.)	
11	Blue Kumuls United FC	20	1	3	16	14	57	−43	6	

Source: RSSSF
Rules for classification: 1) points; 2) goal difference; 3) number of goals scored.
Notes:

Lae City finished top of the table as minor premiers but were eliminated in the semi-finals; Gulf Komara, who finished third, went on to win the grand final.

== Playoffs ==
=== Semi-finals ===
Semi-final
7 December 2025

Gulf Komara FC	3–0	Hekari United FC
Ezikiel Vela 10'; Iammo Manu; Pala Paul

PNG Football Stadium, Port Moresby
Semi-final
7 December 2025

Lae City FC	1–1 (a.e.t.)	FC Morobe Wawens
Penalties
	4–5

Sir Ignatius Kilage Stadium, Lae

=== Third-place play-off ===
Third-place play-off
14 December 2025

Lae City FC	w/o	Hekari United FC

PNG Football Stadium, Port Moresby

Hekari United did not field a team after being told by the PNGFA's own competition department that the fixture was cancelled; Lae City, who had not been informed, were awarded the match by walkover.

=== Grand final ===
Grand final
14 December 2025

Gulf Komara FC	3–1	FC Morobe Wawens

PNG Football Stadium, Port Moresby

Results sourced to RSSSF, except where noted.

== See also ==
- Papua New Guinea Premier Soccer League
- 2024 Papua New Guinea Premier Soccer League
- 2026 Papua New Guinea Premier Soccer League
