= Admiralty FC (Papua New Guinea) =

Semi-professional football club in Manus Province, Papua New Guinea

Admiralty
- Full name: Admiralty Football Club
- Founded: 2013; 13 years ago
- League: National Soccer League

Admiralty FC, often referred to as Admiralty Palaiau, Admiralty Paliau, Admiralty Peliau or Admiralty Peliou, was a semi-professional association football club based in Manus Province, Papua New Guinea.

Founded in 2013, the side took part in three consecutive Papua New Guinea National Soccer League seasons starting in 2014, before splitting from the division and joining the National Premier League ahead of the 2017 season. The side had struggled to find success in these competitions, however, having failed in all five previous seasons to qualify for the championship playoffs.

== History ==
In late 2013, it was reported that a side with the name of Admiralty FC were one of two new teams ahead of the 2014 Papua New Guinea National Soccer League season. The side is owned by an arm of the Manus Provincial Government, Admiralty Peliau Limited, which is 100 percent owned by the people of Manus. To cut down on travel costs, the side based themselves in Port Moresby for the entirety of the season.

The side opened their season with a 1–1 draw against Oro FC, before being beaten by reigning champions Hekari United, who thumped them 6–0. However, they registered their first NSL victory on 22 February 2014 with a 3–0 win against Eastern Stars, with Stars having a man sent off and Solomon Islands import Moffat Kilifa opening the scoring for the debutants. Despite a final day 3–1 victory over Besta PNG United on 10 May, the victory was only their second of the season, and they finished fifth in the regular season table, failing to qualify for the playoffs.

Admiralty were confirmed as having fully registered for the 2015 season as early as July 2014, and had a solid start to the season, drawing three of their opening four matches, including a scoreless draw against champions Hekari. However, narrow defeats to Lae City Dwellers and Besta PNG United saw the side go into the halfway stage bottom of the league with just three points. However, in the second half of the season, they lost once, against Hekari, and managed to pick up wins against Besta PNG United, FC Port Moresby and Madang FC to finish 5th overall.

The side were confirmed for the 2015–16 season in October 2015, and were drawn into the Northern Zone alongside newly-crowned champions Lae City Dwellers, Morobe FC, Madang FC, Besta PNG United, and newcomers Goroka Gosiha. The side based themselves in Lae for the season. The side were unable to win a match until the fourth round of fixtures, when they were able to pick up a 3–0 win against newcomers Goroka Gosiha. This sent them on a run of form, defeating Besta PNG 3–0 and drawing their next two matches before losing their first game in six on 24 January 2016 against Lae City Dwellers, going down 2–1. Another win and a draw saw them finish in 4th place in the regional zone, with only the top two qualifying for the playoffs.

In February 2017, the Manus Football Association, of which Admiralty were a part, broke away from the Papua New Guinea Football Association (PNGFA) alongside ten other governing bodies across the country, and realigned themselves with the Football Federation Papua New Guinea (FFPNG). As part of the new body, the side successfully applied to compete in the inaugural season of the Papua New Guinea National Premier League, and were drawn into the Southern Conference, alongside Hekari United and four other teams. The side once again relocated, back to Port Moresby, ahead of the new season.

The side suffered a heavy 11–0 defeat in their opening fixture against Gigira Amoana, but recovered the following week with a 1–0 victory over Rapatona. The side continued to have a poor defensive record, conceding 29 goals in ten games, but managed to win three games, which placed them 4th in the Southern Zone table at the end of the season. This was not enough to qualify for the playoffs.

The club returned for the 2018 season as one of four teams in the Southern Conference. In a shortened season, each club played each other just once, with Admiralty picking up one win from three – a 4–1 win over Gigira Amoana – to finish third.

In December 2018, following the reunification of the two governing bodies, it was announced that Admiralty would be making a return to the National Soccer League, and would be drawn into the Islands Conference. However, in January, the PNGFA announced that the club had failed to secure funding from the Manus government, and as such would not be entering the 2019 season.

== Domestic record ==
=== National competitions ===
- Papua New Guinea National Soccer League
  - 2014: 5th
  - 2015: 5th
  - 2015–16: Northern Zone: 4th
- Papua New Guinea National Premier League
  - 2017: Southern Conference: 4th
  - 2018: Southern Conference: 3rd
