= Gidix Nasa =

Papua New Guinean footballer

Personal information
- Full name: Gidix Nasa
- Date of birth: January 27, 1968 (age 58)
- Place of birth: Papua New Guinea
- Position: Defender

Senior career*
Years	Team	Apps	(Gls)
1996–2003	Buresong Lae		

International career
1996–1997	Papua New Guinea	6	(0)
- * Club domestic league appearances and goals

Gidix Nasa (born 27 January 1968) is a Papua New Guinean former footballer who played as a defender.

== International career ==
He won six caps for the Papua New Guinea national football team between 1996 and 1997.

== See also ==
- Football in Papua New Guinea
- List of football clubs in Papua New Guinea
