= F.C. Port Moresby =

Association football club

Port Moresby
- Full name: Football Club Port Moresby
- Nickname: The Lion Hearts
- Founded: 2012
- Ground: Sir John Guise Stadium; Port Moresby, Papua New Guinea
- Capacity: 15,000
- Owner: Pacific Assurance Group
- Chairman: Richard Kassman
- Manager: Reggie Davani
- League: Papua New Guinea National Soccer League
- 2015–16: Southern Conference: 3rd

FC Port Moresby was a semi-professional soccer club based in Port Moresby, Papua New Guinea. Founded in 2012, the club competed three times in the Papua New Guinea National Soccer League, until the league split. Their best result came in 2013, finishing as runners-up behind Hekari United, losing 3–0 in the Grand Final.

== History ==
In late 2012, it was reported that a club with the name of Port Moresby City FC had registered interest in the upcoming 2013 Papua New Guinea National Soccer League. On 6 January 2013, it was confirmed that the side, now operating under the name of Football Club Port Moresby, was officially registered as a debuting team.

Under coach Reggie Davani, the side made a slow start to life in the division, losing their opening match 2–0 against reigning champions Hekari United, before going down to Gigira Laitepo Morobe. However, a 3–0 victory over Eastern Stars, who had finished as runners-up in the two previous seasons, set a precedent, and the side would go unbeaten for the remainder of the season, aside from a match awarded against them for failing to show.

After striker Niel Hans scored five goals in a 7–0 thrashing of WNB Tavur in their final regular season match, the side went into the playoffs in fine form, having finished third in the table. Indeed, they managed to get past second-placed Besta PNG United in the semi-final after a 2–0 victory, despite a strong start from the development side. However, they would eventually fall 3–0 at the hands of Hekari in the Grand Final.

Ahead of the 2014 season, the club expressed an interest in renewing their participation, but by October had failed to pay their affiliation fee. On 13 December, it was revealed that the club had been axed from the competition by the National Soccer League board, an action which was appealed by the club, forcing a court order. This court order led to a delay in the start of the season as a stalemate developed between the club and the organising body, despite Port Moresby chairman Richard Kassman insisting that the court case was not preventing the football season from kicking off. The deadlock was broken in early February 2014, when FC Port Moresby withdrew their court case.

After a season-long hiatus, the club returned ahead of the 2015 season. Again, the side only lost three games across the regular season, to Oro FC, Madang FC and Admiralty FC, while managing to beat Hekari United 1–0 after the eight-time champions had already secured the Minor Premiership. However, the side would only finish 4th after losing 3–1 to Lae City Dwellers in the semi-final and 3–0 to Hekari in the third-place match.

Their final season to date was the expanded 2015–16 season, in which 12 teams were sorted into two divisions of six. FC Port Moresby were placed in the Southern Conference alongside Hekari United, but could only finish third after five defeats in ten games – including a surprise final day defeat to Erema FC in February 2016 – left them just a point shy of Rapatona in second place. This was the final season before the league split, and FC Port Moresby have not taken part in any competitive football in the country since.

== Honours ==
=== National competitions ===
- Papua New Guinea National Soccer League
  - Runners-up: 2013
