= 2010–11 Papua New Guinea National Soccer League =

Papua New Guinea National Soccer League
- Season: 2010–11
- Dates: 30 October 2010 – 2 April 2011
- Champions: Hekari United (5th title)
- 2011–12 OFC Champions League: Hekari United
- Top goalscorer: Jamal Seeto

The 2010–11 Papua New Guinea National Soccer League season, known as the Telikom NSL Cup for sponsorship reasons, was the fifth edition of Papua New Guinea National Soccer League.

The title was won for the fifth consecutive season by Hekari United, who defeated Eastern Stars in the Grand Final 4–0. The Golden Boot was won by Jamal Seeto of Besta PNG United, while teammate Emmanuel Simon was the Player of the Season.

== Teams ==
There were seven teams in the competition, with three teams withdrawing and one debuting. Previous runners-up Gelle Hills and Rapatona both withdrew, while University Inter also chose not to take part. Petro Souths became the only new team.

Papua New Guinea National Soccer League 2010–11
Team	Region	Previous best	Other honours
Hekari United	Southern	2006, 2007–08, 2008–09, 2009–10: Champions	2009–10 OFC Champions League: Champions 2007 Port Moresby Premier League: Champions
Gigira Laitepo Morobe F.C.	Northern	2009–10: Runners-Up	1998 National Club Championship: Runners-Up 2001, 2005 Lae Regional Championship: Champions
Madang Fox	Northern	2006: 4th	None
Eastern Stars F.C.	Southern	2008–09, 2009–10: 5th	None
Tukoko University Lae F.C.	Northern	2009–10: 6th	2000 National Club Championship: Champions 2001, 2003, 2005, 2008 Lahi Regional League: Champions
Besta PNG United	Southern	2009–10: 9th	None
Petro Souths F.C.	Highlands	N/A	None

== Format ==
In the regular season, each team played each other twice. The team at the top of the league after all matches were played was crowned 'Minor Premiers' and secured qualification for the 2011–12 OFC Champions League. At the end of the regular season, the top four teams advanced to a knockout competition, the winners of which were crowned Champions.

== Summary ==
Seven teams were confirmed ahead of the new season in early August, although the expected start date of 9 October was postponed until the end of October, due in part to late registration fees.

Hekari United stamped their domination on the division from the first game week with a 6–2 victory over Gigira Laitepo on 30 October. As the only team to win on the opening day, they went straight to the top of the division, where they would remain for almost the entirety of the regular season. They were, however, held to account early on by Eastern Stars and Tukoko University, the latter of whom went unbeaten in their opening four matches. Heading into the winter break, Hekari led the table by a single point ahead of Eastern Stars, with the reigning champions having a game in hand due to their participation in the 2010 FIFA Club World Cup in Abu Dhabi.

Further down the table, the race for the playoffs was proving to be very open, with Gigira Laitepo going into Christmas with five points from five games in fourth place. Madang Fox had one fewer point but a game in hand, while debutants Petro Souths sat sixth with three points from five, and Besta PNG United looked destined to finish bottom again with just two points from six matches.

On 15 January 2011, Gigira Laitepo drew 4–4 with Eastern Stars amid some 'pathetic' refereeing, a result which damaged Stars' title hopes while boosting Gigira's playoff hopes. A week later, Gigira secured a shock 1–0 win over champions Hekari, but would later have the result overturned to a 0–3 defeat after it was discovered they had fielded an ineligible player. In fact, four of Gigira's fixtures – including two more wins, against Besta PNG and Madang Fox – were later overturned for the same reason, with side slumping from playoff hopefuls to league basement dwellers. Elsewhere, Besta PNG United began to revive their season with back-to-back wins, including 2–0 win over Tukoko University on 29 January, which took them into February in fourth place.

On 12 February, with Eastern Stars having closed the gap once again to just one point, Hekari – who now had two games in hand – defeated their closest rivals 2–1 to all but end the fight to be crowned 'Minor Premiers'. Midweek, the four-time champions dropped their first and only points of the season with a 1–1 draw against a revitalised Besta PNG United.

Eastern Stars kept up the pressure, though, while Hekari were away in OFC Champions League action in late February. They defeated Petro Souths 2–1 on 19 February, and won 3–2 against Besta PNG United the following weekend to go top of the league for the first time in the season. With one game to go, they were ahead of Hekari by a single point with 23; however, the reigning champions still had four matches still to play. On what ought to have been the final weekend, both Hekari and Eastern Stars won, meaning Hekari needed just one point from their final three matches to secure the Minor Premiership. A double header against Madang Fox on 12–13 March resulted in two victories, 3–2 and 8–0, which meant their final scheduled match against Tukoko University was scrapped.

It was the first time in National Soccer League history that a side had gone through the regular season unbeaten.

In the playoffs, Hekari withstood some early resilience from Besta PNG United before eventually cruising to a 5–1 victory, while Eastern Stars secured their place in the Grand Final with a 3–1 win over Tukoko University. However, Stars were unable to prevent Hekari from surging to their fifth straight title, with the defending champions winning 4–0 to again reinstate their dominance of Papua New Guinean football.

== Regular season ==
Pos	Team	Pld	W	D	L	GF	GA	GD	Pts	Qualification
1	Hekari United (C)	11	10	1	0	37	10	+27	31 (Note: One match could not be played.)	Qualified for the 2011–12 OFC Champions League Group Stage
2	Eastern Stars FC	12	8	2	2	34	17	+17	26	Qualified for the Championship Playoff
3	Tukoko University Lae FC	11	3	5	3	10	13	−3	14	Qualified for the Championship Playoff
4	Besta PNG United	12	3	4	5	26	25	+1	13	Qualified for the Championship Playoff
5	Petro Souths FC	12	2	6	4	15	19	−4	12	
6	Madang Fox	12	2	2	8	16	35	−19	8	
7	Gigira Laitepo Morobe FC	12	1	4	7	15	34	−19	7	

Source: RSSSF
Rules for classification: 1) points; 2) goal difference; 3) number of goals scored.
(C) Champions

== Championship playoff ==
Semi-finals
Hekari United FC	5
Besta PNG United	1
Eastern Stars FC	3
Tukoko University Lae FC	1

Final
Hekari United FC	4
Eastern Stars FC	0

=== Semi-finals ===
26 March 2011

Hekari United FC	5–1	Besta PNG United
Malakai Tiwa; Samuel Kini; Wira Wama		Jamal Seeto

Lloyd Robson Oval, Port Moresby
26 March 2011

Eastern Stars FC	3–1	Tukoko University
Karol Kakate; Fabian Bagi		Goal

Lloyd Robson Oval, Port Moresby

=== Final ===
2 April 2011

Hekari United FC	4–0	Eastern Stars FC
Ian Yanum; Malakai Tiwa (pen.)

Lloyd Robson Oval, Port Moresby
