= Petro Souths F.C. =

Papua New Guinea association football club based in Mendi

Petro Souths
- Full name: Petro Souths Football Club
- Founded: 2010
- League: National Soccer League
- 2011–12: 7th

Petro Souths FC was a semi-professional association football club founded in 2010 and based in Mendi, the capital of the Southern Highlands province of Papua New Guinea, although they played their home games in Goroka.

The side played in two editions of the Papua New Guinea National Soccer League, with their best result coming in the 2010–11 season, where they narrowly missed out on qualification for the playoffs, finishing 5th.

== History ==
New franchise Petro Souths announced their arrival to the National Soccer League in July 2010, ahead of the 2010–11 season. They were one of seven teams who took part in that season. The side started the season moderately well, losing only one of their opening four matches – to reigning champions Hekari United, 2–0 – and drawing the other three. In fact, the side would only lose four matches all season: home and away to both Hekari and second-placed Eastern Stars, who both dominated the division. However, six draws and just two wins, against Madang Fox and Gigira Laitepo, meant the side missed out on the playoff places by a single point.

In July 2011, it was announced that the side were registered to play in the upcoming 2011–12 season. Once again, the side were one of seven teams, but this season saw a steep decline in form for the side. With teams playing each other three times instead of twice, the side scored just 19 goals in 18 games, conceded 50, and lost 12 matches, including a 5–1 defeat to fellow strugglers Bulolo, eventually finishing bottom of the table. Ahead of the delayed 2013 season, Souths were not on the clubs list.

== Domestic record ==
=== National competitions ===
- Papua New Guinea National Soccer League
  - 2010–11: 5th
  - 2011–12: 7th
