= WNB Tavur =

- Full name: West New Britain Tavur Football Club
- Founded: 2012; 14 years ago
- Ground: Bisini Soccer Ground, Port Moresby
- Capacity: 1,500
- League: Papua New Guinea National Soccer League

West New Britain Tavur, generally shortened to WNB Tavur, was an association football club based in West New Britain, a province of Papua New Guinea. The side competed for the first time in the 2013 edition of the Papua New Guinea National Soccer League, where they finished 7th out of eight teams.

== History ==
In december 2012, it was revealed that a side under the name of Tavur, heralding from West New Britain province, were the fourth team to join the 2013 national season. Initially managed by Luke Muta, father of David Muta and Cyril Muta, the side was made up predominantly of local players, and entered the season with only two players who had accrued NSL experience in previous years. They started the season with an impressive 1–1 draw against two-time runners-up Eastern Stars, but this would not be a catalyst to a good season, with the side picking up three victories – two of which were awarded in their favour without kicking a ball – and the third was a 2–1 victory over Besta PNG United on 7 April 2013, by which time they were managed by Posman Paliau. The side finished 7th in the league. In November 2013, it was revealed that the side had twice failed to pay the affiliation fee ahead of the 2014 season, and had therefore been excluded from the upcoming season.

== Domestic record ==
=== National competitions ===
- Papua New Guinea National Soccer League
  - 2013: 7th
