= 2011–12 Papua New Guinea National Soccer League =

Papua New Guinea National Soccer League
- Season: 2011–12
- Dates: 15 October 2011 – 15 April 2012
- Champions: Hekari United (6th title)
- 2012–13 OFC Champions League: Hekari United
- Top goalscorer: Raymond Gunemba (10 goals)

The 2011–12 Papua New Guinea National Soccer League season, known as the Telikom NSL Cup for sponsorship reasons, was the sixth edition of Papua New Guinea National Soccer League.

The title was won by Hekari United, who defeated Eastern Stars in the Grand Final 3–0 to win their sixth consecutive title. The Golden Boot was won by Raymond Gunemba of Hekari, while Emmanuel Simon of Besta PNG United was the Player of the Season for the third straight year.

== Teams ==
As in the previous season, there were seven teams in the competition, with six remaining from last season: Hekari United, Eastern Stars, Tukoko University, Besta PNG United, Petro Souths, and Gigira Laitepo Morobe (who relocated and were renamed Gigira Laitepo Central Coast). After taking part in four of the previous five seasons, Madang Fox withdrew, eventually taking a three-year hiatus. They were replaced by Bulolo United.

Papua New Guinea National Soccer League 2011–12
Team	Previous best	Other honours
Hekari United	2006, 2007–08, 2008–09, 2009–10, 2010–11: Champions	2009–10 OFC Champions League: Champions 2007 Port Moresby Premier League: Champions
Eastern Stars F.C.	2010–11: Runners-Up	None
Gigira Laitepo Central Coast F.C.	2009–10: Runners-Up (as Gigira Laitepo Morobe)	1998 National Club Championship: Runners-Up 2001, 2005 Lae Regional Championship: Champions
Tukoko University Lae F.C.	2010–11: 3rd	2000 National Club Championship: Champions 2001, 2003, 2005, 2008 Lahi Regional League: Champions
Besta PNG United	2010–11: 4th	None
Petro Souths F.C.	2010–11: 5th	None
Bulolo United F.C.	N/A	1987 National Club Championship: Group Stage 1998 Lae Regional Championship: Runners-Up

Five of the six returning teams were coming off their best ever season, with Hekari having matched their previous four victories with a fifth, and Eastern Stars, Tukoko University, Besta PNG and Petro Souths all having finished in their highest ever league position in the previous year.

== Format ==
In a change to tradition, during the regular season, each team played each other three times, a change from the previous season where teams played each other twice. The team at the top of the league after all matches were played was crowned 'Minor Premiers' and secured qualification for the 2012–13 OFC Champions League. At the end of the regular season, the top four teams advanced to a knockout competition, the winners of which were crowned Champions.

== Summary ==
With the seven clubs confirmed by the end of August, the season kicked off on 15 October 2011, with Hekari United securing a comfortable 3–0 victory over the reformed Central Coast in Port Moresby, but it was Eastern Stars who went top of the league with a 7–0 thrashing of Petro Souths. Debutants Bulolo secured a shock opening day victory over Tukoko University, winning 3–1. In week two, last season's runners-up Eastern Stars were dealt a surprise defeat by Central Coast, going down 2–0 in what would be the first of only two defeats during the season, while Hekari scored three again to defeat newcomers Bulolo, going top of the league early on once again. They maintained this lead after the third round of fixtures, defeating Tukoko University 1–0 to go onto nine points from nine fixtures and with zero goals conceded, with Central Coast in second on 6, and Eastern Stars and Bulolo, who had played out a goalless draw at the end of October, tied on four points.

The first weekend of November saw all three scheduled fixtures cancelled, due to unrest in Lae and flight cancellations. Only one of these games was replayed the following midweek, with Central Coast defeating Petro Souths 2–1 to go level with Hekari at the top of the league. Fixtures continued to be postponed during these times as the unrest continued, some of which were never rescheduled. Going into December, Hekari and Central Coast were sitting first and second, separated by just one point, after Hekari suffered their first and only defeat of the season at the hands of Besta PNG United in mid-November, while Central Coast fell 3–2 to Tukoko University in the final week of November.

In the first weekend of December, the top two went head-to-head, with Hekari soaring to a 4–0 victory over Central Coast, thanks in part to a brace from Wira Wama, putting them four clear at the top of the league. This result saw a dip in form for Central Coast, as through December, they fell behind Eastern Stars and Besta PNG United in fourth. Hekari continued to dominate after the Christmas period, and a 3–0 victory over then-second Besta PNG United on 4 February 2012 saw them increase their lead to eight points ahead of the U–20 side. The fight for second was much tighter, with Besta sitting on 20 points ahead of both Eastern Stars and Central Coast on 19. Coast's form fell off a cliff in February, losing every match, while Hekari surged forward, reaching 40 points – 13 ahead of Eastern Stars in second – by the end of February, an almost insurmountable lead.

By the end of March, several matches were still yet to be played, and with the semi-finals due to commence on the first weekend of April, teams like Besta PNG United and Hekari United had initially been requested to complete all their outstanding fixtures – in some cases, up to four – in one week. However, eventually, the remaining fixtures were discarded, and Hekari, Eastern Stars, Besta PNG and Tukoko University – for unknown reasons, qualifying ahead of Central Coast – making the playoffs.

In the semi-finals, Hekari United and Eastern Stars set up a repeat of the previous season's final, after both sides came away with relatively comfortable victories: Hekari defeated Tukoko University 3–1, while Eastern Stars edged past Besta PNG United 1–0. In the third-place playoff, Besta defeated Tukoko on penalties, while Hekari claimed their sixth straight title with a 3–0 win over Eastern Stars.

== Regular season ==
Pos	Team	Pld	W	D	L	GF	GA	GD	Pts	Qualification
1	Hekari United (C)	16	13	2	1	55	9	+46	41	Qualified for the 2012–13 OFC Champions League Group Stage
2	Eastern Stars FC	17	8	7	2	35	16	+19	31	Qualified for the Championship Playoff
3	Besta PNG United	15	7	4	4	23	18	+5	25	Qualified for the Championship Playoff
4	Gigira Laitepo Central Coast	17	7	1	9	20	31	−11	22 (Note: Several matches could not be played due to weather. Tukoko University qualified for semifinals instead of Central Coast.)	
5	Tukoko University Lae FC	17	5	3	9	26	39	−13	18	Qualified for the Championship Playoff
6	Bulolo United FC	18	5	2	11	25	40	−15	17	
7	Petro Souths FC	16	3	1	12	19	50	−31	10	

Source: RSSSF
Rules for classification: 1) points; 2) goal difference; 3) number of goals scored.
(C) Champions

== Championship playoff ==
Semi-finals
Hekari United	3
Tukoko University	1
Eastern Stars	1
Besta PNG United	0

Final
Hekari United FC	3
Eastern Stars	0
Third place
Tukoko University	2(3)
Besta PNG United (p)	2(4)

=== Semi-finals ===
7 April 2012

Hekari United	3–1	Tukoko University
Maciu Dunadamu 20'; Pita Bolatoga 78'; Andrew Lepani 88'		30' Gerald Lashel

Lloyd Robson Oval, Port Moresby
7 April 2012

Eastern Stars FC	1–0	Besta PNG United
Goal

Sir Ignatius Kilage Stadium, Lae

=== Third-place playoff ===
15 April 2012

Besta PNG United	2–2 (a.e.t.)	Tukoko University
Goal		Goal
Penalties
	4–3

Lloyd Robson Oval, Port Moresby

=== Final ===
15 April 2012

Hekari United FC	3–0	Eastern Stars FC
Taniela Waqa 17'; Kema Jack 27'; Wira Wama 48'

Lloyd Robson Oval, Port Moresby
