= Ilisoni Tuinawaivuvu =

Fijian footballer

Personal information
- Full name: Ilisoni Logaivau Tuinawaivuvu
- Date of birth: 8 January 1991 (age 35)
- Place of birth: Fiji
- Position: Midfielder

Team information
- Current team: Labasa

Senior career*
Years	Team	Apps	(Gls)
2009–	Labasa		

International career
2012	Fiji U23	3	(0)
2012–	Fiji	5	(0)
Medal record
Men's football
Representing Fiji
MSG Prime Minister's Cup
Winner	2026 Fiji
- * Club domestic league appearances and goals

Ilisoni Logaivau Tuinawaivuvu (born 8 January 1991) is a Fijian football player. Currently a member of Labasa in the National Football League.

== Honours ==
Fiji

- MSG Prime Minister's Cup : 2026
