= Pierre Kohumoetini =

Tahitian footballer (born 1987)

Personal information
- Full name: Pierre Kohumoetini
- Date of birth: 18 February 1987 (age 39)
- Place of birth: Tahiti
- Position: Midfielder

Team information
- Current team: AS Saint-Étienne

International career
Years	Team	Apps	(Gls)
2012–	Tahiti	5	(0)
Medal record
Men's football
Representing Tahiti
OFC Nations Cup
Winner	2012 Solomon Islands

Pierre Kohumoetini (born 18 February 1987) is a Tahitian footballer currently playing for AS Saint-Étienne. He is a member of Tahiti national football team.

== International career ==
Kohumoetini made his debut for the senior team during the 2012 OFC Nations Cup. He appeared in two matches as a substitute.

== Career statistics ==
Tahiti national team
Year	Apps	Goals
2012	5	0
Total	5	0

== Honours ==
Tahiti

- OFC Nations Cup: 2012
