= 2015–16 Papua New Guinea National Soccer League =

Papua New Guinea National Soccer League
- Season: 2015–16
- Dates: 21 November 2015 – 19 March 2016
- Champions: Lae City Dwellers
- 2017 OFC Champions League: Lae City Dwellers; Madang FC
- Top goalscorer: Koriak Upaiga

The 2015–16 Papua New Guinea National Soccer League season, known as the Telikom NSL Cup for sponsorship reasons, was the tenth edition of the Papua New Guinea National Soccer League.

The title was won by Lae City Dwellers, who picked up their second title after defeating eight-time champions Hekari United 2–0 in the final. Both the Golden Boot and the Player of the Season awards were won by Koriak Upaiga of Hekari United.

It would be the final season before the league split, which saw several teams split from the Papua New Guinea Football Association to form their own league, the National Premier League. Domestic soccer would remain split until the 2019 season.

== Teams ==
The season saw 12 teams competing, the highest number since the league's inception. Only one side failed to return from the previous season, Oro FC, while two sides were returning from hiatuses of varying lengths: Morobe FC returned after just one season under new sponsorship, while Rapatona returned having last competed in the 2009–10 season. There were also four debuting teams – Goroka Gosiha, in the Northern Conference, and Erema FC, a new Gigira-sponsored team called Gigira Laitepo United, and PS Rutz, under the name of sponsors Huawei, who were the only new side with history, having reached the final of the National Club Championship in 2002 and having won the Port Moresby Premier League twice.

Papua New Guinea National Soccer League 2015–16
Northern Conference
| Team | Previous best | Other honours |
|---|---|---|
| Lae City Dwellers | 2015: Champions | None |
| Madang F.C. | 2015: Runners-up | None |
| Welgris Morobe United | 2009–10: Runners-Up | 1998 National Club Championship: Runners-up 2001, 2005 Lae Regional Championship: Champions |
| Besta PNG United | 2011–12, 2013: Third | None |
| Admiralty F.C. | 2015: 5th | None |
| Goroka Gosiha | N/A | None |
Southern Conference
| Team | Previous best | Other honours |
| Hekari United | 2006–14: Champions (8x) | 2009–10 OFC Champions League: Champions 2007 Port Moresby Premier League: Champions |
| F.C. Port Moresby | 2013: Runners-up | None |
| Rapatona F.C. | 2008–09: Runners-up | 1984, 1999 National Club Championship: Runners-Up 1989, 2004 Port Moresby Premier League: Champions |
| PS Huawei | N/A | 2002 National Club Championship: Runners-up 2000, 2005 Port Moresby Premier League: Champions |
| Erema F.C. | N/A | None |
| Gigira Laitepo United | N/A | None |

== Format ==
Twelve teams played in the league. For the first stage, the clubs are divided into a Northern and Southern Zone, with each team playing each other in their zone twice, home and away. At the end of the first stage the top two teams from each zone advance to the four-team 'National Champions League' Championship Playoff, with the top two both qualifying for the 2017 OFC Champions League and the domestic Grand Final, where the winner was crowned Champions.

== Summary ==
With the two former league champions, Lae City Dwellers and Hekari United, separated in the new conference system, both sides qualified for the Championship Playoff stage with relative ease from their respective pools, and were joined by Welgris Morobe and Rapatona.

In the Northern Conference, champions Lae City made a flying start with an opening day 7–0 victory over Goroka Gosiha, who would go on to lose all ten of their games. Lae would lead the conference from start to finish, losing only once, on the final day, when they had already confirmed their qualification to the next stage. The battle for second place was more interesting, with three sides – Welgris Morobe, Madang and Besta PNG United – all level on six points after three rounds of fixtures. On matchday four, Morobe and Madang played out a 2–2 draw, after Madang led by two goals, a result which would end up being crucial in the final standings. As the season wore on, Morobe and Madang emerged as the main contenders for the second qualifying spot, and with two fixtures to go, Madang led Morobe by a single point ahead of their crucial return leg. On 30 January 2016, Morobe defeated Madang 2–0 to all but guarantee their qualification to the Championship Playoff. This was confirmed with a final day victory over Goroka Gosiha, despite Madang's win over Lae.

The Southern Conference was uncompetitive for eight-time champions Hekari, who won all ten of their matches, conceding only 12 goals. However, behind them, qualification in the second slot went down to the wire: at the half-way stage, only three points separated second from sixth place. On 9 January 2016, the two clubs leading the way, Rapatona and Erema, faced off in the opening round of the second set of fixtures. Rapatona picked up a 3–1 to put them in the driving seat for second place. However, FC Port Moresby began the second half of the season in form, defeating PS Huawei 6–0 before a narrow 1–0 win over Gigira Laitepo. This culminated in a 3–0 win against Rapatona on 23 January, which gave them a three-point cushion in second place with two games to go. Despite a loss the following week to Hekari, FC Port Moresby still went into the final day needing just a point against Erema to qualify for the next stage. However, in what was seen by most as a shock, Erema defeated Port Moresby 2–1 while Rapatona secured a win over Gigira Laitepo by the same scoreline, earning qualification ahead of the team from the capital.

The Championship Playoff was dominated by Lae and Hekari, with Morobe and Rapatona winning just one game apiece – against each other. Hekari topped the group after a 5–0 victory over Lae on 12 March 2019, with both sides qualifying for the OFC Champions League and the Grand Final, which was to take place a week later.

Despite their previous defeat, champions Lae responded in the Grand Final, securing their second title in a row with a 2–0 victory over Hekari thanks to two goals from Raymond Gunemba.

Due to Hekari's defection from the league in early 2017, they were disqualified from the 2017 OFC Champions League. As a result, the next best-placed side which had remained with the league, Madang FC, took their place.

== Regular season ==
=== Northern zone ===
| Pos | Team | Pld | W | D | L | GF | GA | GD | Pts | Qualification |
|---|---|---|---|---|---|---|---|---|---|---|
| 1 | Lae City Dwellers | 10 | 7 | 2 | 1 | 24 | 6 | +18 | 23 | Qualified to the 2016 Championship Playoff |
| 2 | Welgris Morobe United | 10 | 6 | 2 | 2 | 15 | 8 | +7 | 20 | Qualified to the 2016 Championship Playoff |
| 3 | Madang FC | 10 | 5 | 3 | 2 | 14 | 9 | +5 | 18 | Qualified to the 2017 OFC Champions League Group Stage |
| 4 | Admiralty FC | 10 | 3 | 4 | 3 | 13 | 7 | +6 | 13 | |
| 5 | Besta United PNG | 10 | 3 | 1 | 6 | 9 | 17 | −8 | 10 | |
| 6 | Goroka Gosiha | 10 | 0 | 0 | 10 | 7 | 35 | −28 | 0 | |

Updated to match(es) played on 6 February 2016. Source: RSSSF
Rules for classification: 1) points; 2) goal difference; 3) number of goals scored.

=== Southern zone ===
| Pos | Team | Pld | W | D | L | GF | GA | GD | Pts | Qualification |
|---|---|---|---|---|---|---|---|---|---|---|
| 1 | Hekari United | 10 | 10 | 0 | 0 | 39 | 12 | +27 | 30 | Qualified to the 2016 Championship Playoff |
| 2 | Rapatona | 10 | 4 | 2 | 4 | 12 | 16 | −4 | 14 | Qualified to the 2016 Championship Playoff |
| 3 | FC Port Moresby | 10 | 4 | 1 | 5 | 19 | 13 | +6 | 13 | |
| 4 | Erema | 10 | 3 | 2 | 5 | 15 | 25 | −10 | 11 | |
| 5 | Gigira Laitepo United | 10 | 2 | 3 | 5 | 13 | 19 | −6 | 9 | |
| 6 | PS Huawei | 10 | 2 | 2 | 6 | 14 | 27 | −13 | 8 | |

Updated to match(es) played on 6 February 2016. Source: RSSSF
Rules for classification: 1) points; 2) goal difference; 3) number of goals scored.

== Championship playoff ==
| Pos | Team | Pld | W | D | L | GF | GA | GD | Pts | Qualification |
|---|---|---|---|---|---|---|---|---|---|---|
| 1 | Hekari United | 6 | 5 | 1 | 0 | 15 | 1 | +14 | 16 | |
| 2 | Lae City Dwellers (C) | 6 | 4 | 1 | 1 | 14 | 5 | +9 | 13 | Qualified to the 2017 OFC Champions League Group Stage |
| 3 | Welgris Morobe United | 6 | 1 | 0 | 5 | 3 | 13 | −10 | 3 | |
| 4 | Rapatona | 6 | 1 | 0 | 5 | 2 | 15 | −13 | 3 | |

Updated to match(es) played on 12 March 2016. Source: RSSSF
Rules for classification: 1) points; 2) goal difference; 3) number of goals scored.
(C) Champions

== Grand final ==
19 March 2016

| Hekari United | 0–2 | Lae City Dwellers |
|---|---|---|
| | | Raymond Gunemba |

Sir John Guise Stadium, Port Moresby
