= 2015 Papua New Guinea National Soccer League =

Papua New Guinea National Soccer League
- Season: 2015
- Dates: 24 January – 23 May 2015
- Champions: Lae City Dwellers (1st title)
- 2016 OFC Champions League: Hekari United; Lae City Dwellers
- Top goalscorer: Nigel Dabinyaba (11 goals)

The 2015 Papua New Guinea National Soccer League season, known as the Telikom NSL Cup for sponsorship reasons, was the ninth edition of the Papua New Guinea National Soccer League.

The title was won by Lae City Dwellers who won their first title in their first year of existence, despite only finishing second in the regular season table. They defeated Madang FC 5–1 in the Grand Final. The Golden Boot was won by Nigel Dabinyaba of Lae, while Otto Kusunan of Besta PNG United won the Player of the Season.

== Teams ==
There were seven teams in the competition, the same as the previous season. Four teams returned, including champions Hekari United, while three teams withdrew: runners-up Lae FC were expelled from the league after 'bringing the game into disrepute' in the previous year's final, Morobe FC lost their sponsor and were unable to return, missing out for the first time since the league's inception, while Eastern Stars also withdrew. They were replaced by Madang FC, returning for the first time since the 2010–11 season, FC Port Moresby, who returned following their court case ahead of the previous season, and Lae City Dwellers, a new franchise from Lae under similar management to the previous season's runners-up.

Papua New Guinea National Soccer League 2015
Team	Previous best	Other honours
Hekari United	2006–14: Champions (8x)	2009–10 OFC Champions League: Champions 2007 Port Moresby Premier League: Champions
F.C. Port Moresby	2013: Runners-Up	None
Besta PNG United	2011–12, 2013: 3rd	None
Madang F.C.	2006: 4th	None
Oro F.C.	2014: 4th	None
Admiralty F.C.	2014: 6th	None
Lae City Dwellers	N/A	None

== Format ==
Seven teams played in the league. During the regular season, teams played home and away, and the team at the top of the league after all matches were played was crowned 'Minor Premiers'. The top two secured qualification for the 2016 OFC Champions League. At the end of the regular season, the top four teams advanced to a knockout competition, the winners of which were crowned Champions.

== Summary ==
The season kicked off on 24 January 2018 with a 2–2 draw between Lae City Dwellers and FC Port Moresby. Champions Hekari United didn't kick their season off until the following weekend, when they defeated Lae 3–0, and they set the early pace with a 2–1 win over Besta PNG United the following weekend. By mid-February, they were already four points clear of Oro FC, who were in second on six points.

Through February and March until the mid-way point of the season, Lae City began to show some form, winning three straight matches against Besta, Admiralty FC and Oro to keep the pressure on Hekari, who had gone the entire first half of the season undefeated. However, on 14 March 2018, Hekari thrashed Oro 6–2 while Lae lost 2–1 to third-placed FC Port Moresby, giving Hekari a four-point lead. As the champions prepared to leave for the OFC Champions League campaign in April, however, they stumbled to a 2–1 defeat to Besta PNG United, which gave Lae City a chance to overhaul them while they were away.

Two big wins for Lae – a 6–0 thumping of Oro and a 5–1 win against Besta – meant Hekari's main challengers were two points clear at the top by the time Hekari returned to domestic competition. On 25 April, Hekari defeated Madang 8–1 while Lae could only draw against Admiralty, meaning Hekari returned to the top of the league with a game in hand. In Lae's final fixture of the regular season, they surrendered the Minor Premiership to Hekari following a 3–1 defeat, but in finishing second, became the first team other than Hekari to qualifying for the OFC Champions League since University Inter in 2007–08.

In the playoff semi-finals, which took place on 16 May 2015, Hekari faced Madang FC, whom they had beaten by seven goals less than a month prior. In what was described as 'the biggest upset in the history of the National Soccer League', Madang secured a shock 3–2 victory to end Hekari's eight-year dominance of the domestic league. They would play Lae City in the Grand Final after the regular season runners-up eased past third-placed FC Port Moresby in the other semi-final. While Hekari picked up third place as a consolation, Lae City won their first title after a one-sided Grand Final, which finished 5–1.

== Regular season ==
Pos	Team	Pld	W	D	L	GF	GA	GD	Pts	Qualification
1	Hekari United	12	8	2	2	29	9	+20	26	Qualified for the 2016 OFC Champions League Group Stage
2	Lae City Dwellers (C)	12	7	2	3	28	16	+12	23	Qualified for the 2016 OFC Champions League Group Stage
3	FC Port Moresby	12	6	3	3	20	18	+2	21	Qualified to Championship Playoff
4	Madang FC	12	5	2	5	19	24	−5	17	Qualified to Championship Playoff
5	Admiralty FC	12	3	5	4	17	16	+1	14	
6	Oro FC	12	3	1	8	13	31	−18	10	
7	Besta PNG United	12	2	1	9	13	25	−12	7	

Source: RSSSF
Rules for classification: 1) points; 2) goal difference; 3) number of goals scored.
(C) Champions

== Championship playoff ==
Semi-finals
Lae City Dwellers	3
FC Port Moresby	1
Hekari United	2
Madang FC	3

Final
Lae City Dwellers	5
Madang FC	1
Third place
FC Port Moresby	0
Hekari United	3

=== Semi-finals ===
16 May 2015

Lae City Dwellers	3–1	FC Port Moresby

Laiwaden Oval, Madang
16 May 2015

Hekari United	2–3	Madang FC

Laiwaden Oval, Madang

=== Third-place playoff ===
23 May 2015

FC Port Moresby	0–3	Hekari United

Sir Ignatius Kilage Stadium, Lae

=== Final ===
23 May 2015

Lae City Dwellers	5–1	Madang FC
Lee Wabing 53'; Nigel Dabinyaba 68'; Obert Bika 81'; Raymond Gunemba 90'; Ken Kepe 90'		58' Vanya Malagian

Sir Ignatius Kilage Stadium, Lae
