= Richard Alois =

Papua New Guinean footballer

Personal information
- Place of birth: Papua New Guinea
- Position: Forward

Team information
- Current team: Huawei PS United

Senior career*
| Years | Team | Apps | (Gls) |
| 2016– | Huawei PS United | | |

International career^{‡}
| 2017– | Papua New Guinea | 2 | (0) |
- * Club domestic league appearances and goals as of 18:02, 4 June 2017 (UTC) ‡ National team caps and goals as of 18:02, 4 June 2017 (UTC)

Richard Alois is a Papua New Guinean footballer who usually plays as a forward. He appeared in the Papua New Guinean team Huawei PS United and the Papua New Guinea national team.

== Career ==
=== International ===
Alois made his first senior international appearance in a 2018 FIFA World Cup qualification game against Tahiti on 23 March 2017, having substituted Patrick Aisa in the 60th minute.
