= United Highlands FC =

United Highlands
- Ground: Kimininga Police Barracks Oval
- Manager: Mathias Apo
- League: Papua New Guinea Premier Soccer League
- 2025: 7th

United Highlands FC is a Papua New Guinean association football club from Mount Hagen that last competed in the Papua New Guinea Premier Soccer League.

== History ==
Ahead of the 2023 season, United Highlands held a tournament for teams from the Western Highlands Province. The club, under head coach Mathias Apo, selected the top players to comprise its final Premier Soccer League squad. The squad was also bolstered by players from other Premier Soccer League clubs including Lae City and Hekari United.
