= Jeremy Yasasa =

Papua New Guinean footballer

Personal information
- Full name: Jeremy Yasasa
- Date of birth: 27 March 1985 (age 41)
- Position: Defender

Team information
- Current team: Hekari United
- Number: 16

Senior career*
Years	Team	Apps	(Gls)
2008–10	Hekari United		
2010–2014	Eastern Stars FC		
2014–	Hekari United		

International career^{‡}
2011–	Papua New Guinea	7	(2)
Medal record
Men's football
Representing Papua New Guinea
OFC Nations Cup
Runner-up	2016 Papua New Guinea
- * Club domestic league appearances and goals ‡ National team caps and goals as of 27 January 2013

Jeremy Yasasa (born 27 March 1985) is a Papua New Guinean footballer who plays as a defender for Hekari United in the Papua New Guinea National Soccer League and the Papua New Guinea national team.

== Honours ==
Papua New Guinea

- OFC Nations Cup: runner-up, 2016
