= Kila Iaravai =

Papua New Guinean footballer

Personal information
- Full name: Kila Iaravai
- Date of birth: 7 January 1991 (age 35)
- Place of birth: Papua New Guinea
- Position: Defender

Team information
- Current team: Hekari United

Senior career*
Years	Team	Apps	(Gls)
- Morobe Kumuls

International career
2012	Papua New Guinea	2	(0)
- * Club domestic league appearances and goals

Kila Iaravai is a Papua New Guinean football player. Currently a member of Hekari United in the Papua New Guinea National Soccer League. He has made 2 appearances for the Papua New Guinea national football team.
