= Oro F.C. =

Oro
- Full name: NC Civil Works Oro Football Club
- Founded: 2013
- Ground: Bisini Soccer Ground, Port Moresby
- Capacity: 1,500
- League: Papua New Guinea National Soccer League

Oro FC, known for sponsorship reasons as NC Civil Works Oro FC and briefly as Oro Bird Wing FC, was a semi-professional soccer club founded in 2013 and hailing from Oro Province, Papua New Guinea, but playing their home games Port Moresby.

The club competed in three editions of the Papua New Guinea National Soccer League, the country's top division. Their finest moment came in the 2014 edition, when they finished second in the regular season, before finishing fourth in the playoffs.

== History ==
In late 2012, it was announced that a club from Oro Province, then named Bird Wing FC, had secured funding from the provincial government to enter the 2013 season of the Papua New Guinea National Soccer League. The club was officially formed in early 2013, and were one of eight teams entered into the upcoming domestic season, under the name of NC Civil Works Oro FC, despite their late fee payment almost costing them a place in the league.

The club was disappointing in their debut season, with results improving after replacing coach John Davani with Lua Vagi in April. In the end, they missed out on the playoffs by nine points, and finished fifth in the regular season table. In October 2013, it was confirmed that the club would be competing in the 2014 season. With coach Joe Turia at the helm, the side secured a second-place finish, qualifying for the finals with a 1–0 victory over Morobe on 26 April 2014. This joy was short-lived, however, as the side were beaten 3–2 after extra time by eventual champions Lae, before losing to Morobe in the third-place playoff.

By the end of July 2014, the side had already confirmed their participation in the 2015 season, but the side fared much more poorly, winning just three matches and finishing sixth out of seven sides, while conceding the most goals in the competition after letting six in against both Hekari United and Lae in the second half of the season.

In September 2015, it was reported that Oro would once again be competing in the restructured 2015–16 season of the competition, having registered for the Southern Conference alongside Hekari, Admiralty FC and FC Port Moresby. However, when the fixture list was drawn in November, Oro were not one of the teams involved. In December 2018, after the league split, it was reported that Oro had expressed their interest in competing in the 2019 season, possibly in a merge with MacLaren FC.

== Domestic record ==
=== National competitions ===
- Papua New Guinea National Soccer League
  - 2013: 5th
  - 2014: 4th
  - 2015: 6th
