= Goroka Gosiha F.C. =

Association football club in Papua New Guinea

Goroka Gosiha
- Full name: Goroka Gosiha Football Club
- Founded: 2015
- Chairman: Cathy Agunam
- Manager: Michael Steven
- League: National Soccer League
- 2015–16: Northern Conference: 6th

Goroka Gosiha FC is an association football club founded in late 2015 and based in Goroka, Papua New Guinea.

The side took part in one edition of the Papua New Guinea National Soccer League, the 2015–16 season, and finished bottom of the Northern Conference after losing all ten of their matches.

== History ==
In late 2015, it was revealed that a club from Goroka would be taking part in an expanded edition of the Papua New Guinea National Soccer League. This team, chaired by Cathy Agunam and coached by Michael Steven, consisted mainly of imported players from Madang and Sepik, and well as a few local players. They were drawn into the Northern Conference, but by Christmas had failed to register a win in any of their opening five games.

In an attempt to boost their fortunes, Agunam secured the signings of two former Welgris Highlanders players Marshall Lori and Japheth Olow, as well as Lae City Dwellers' midfielder Michael Saun ahead of the second half of the season. However, the side continued to struggle, losing all ten of their matches, with their fate sealed on the final day after a 3–0 defeat to Morobe FC.

Ahead of the 2019 season, Agunam claimed she believed that the region had enough talent to justify a return to the NSL. However, the major hurdle standing in their way was funding. Upon the launch of the new season, Goroka Gosiha were not one of the clubs registered to take part.

== Domestic Record ==
=== National Competitions ===
- Papua New Guinea National Soccer League
  - 2015–16: Northern Conference: 6th
