= Eric Komeng =

Papua New Guinean footballer

Personal information
- Full name: Ericsson Komeng
- Date of birth: 16 June 1984 (age 42)
- Place of birth: Port Moresby, Papua New Guinea
- Height: 1.64 m (5 ft 5 in)
- Position: Midfielder

Senior career*
Years	Team	Apps	(Gls)
2004–2009	PS United Port Moresby		
2009–2014	PRK Hekari United		

International career
2004–2014	Papua New Guinea	7	(1)
- * Club domestic league appearances and goals

Ericsson Komeng is a Papua New Guinean former international footballer who played as a midfielder. He is currently coaching PNG Hekari FC Women.
