= Kelly Jampu =

Papua New Guinean footballer

Personal information
- Full name: Kelly Jampu
- Date of birth: October 22, 1986 (age 40)
- Position: Defender

Senior career*
Years	Team	Apps	(Gls)
2011–	University Inter Port Moresby		

International career^{‡}
2011–	Papua New Guinea	4	(0)
- * Club domestic league appearances and goals ‡ National team caps and goals as of 27 January 2013

Kelly Jampu (born October 22, 1986) is a Papua New Guinean footballer who plays as defender.
