= Leslie Kalai =

Papua New Guinean footballer (born 1984)

Personal information
- Full name: Leslie Kalai
- Date of birth: 6 December 1984 (age 41)
- Place of birth: Papua New Guinea
- Position: Goalkeeper

Team information
- Current team: Hekari United
- Number: 1

Senior career*
Years	Team	Apps	(Gls)
2007–	Hekari United		

International career
2011–	Papua New Guinea	6	(0)
Medal record
Men's football
Representing Papua New Guinea
OFC Nations Cup
Runner-up	2016 Papua New Guinea
- * Club domestic league appearances and goals

Leslie Kalai (born 6 December 1984) is a Papua New Guinean footballer who is a goalkeeper. He plays on both the domestic and international levels, for Hekari United and Papua New Guinea, respectively.

== Club career ==
Kalai transferred to Hekari United in January 2011, on a free transfer. His given transfer value is €50,000.

== International career ==
Kalai was selected for the Papua New Guinean 2012 OFC Nations Cup roster, where his side finished last in their group, recording 3 losses and no wins. As far in his career, he has appeared in 3 FIFA World Cup qualifiers, a 1–1 draw with Fiji, a 1–2 defeat at the hands of New Zealand, and 1–0 defeat to the Solomon Islands.

=== FIFA match statistics ===
2 June 2012 2012 OFC Nations Cup GS	Papua New Guinea	0–1	Solomon Islands	Honiara, Solomon Islands
15:00 SBT		Report	Totori 5'	Stadium: Lawson Tama Stadium; Attendance: 15,000; Referee: Norbert Hauata (Tahiti)

4 June 2012 2012 OFC Nations Cup GS	Papua New Guinea	1–2	New Zealand	Honiara, Solomon Islands
12:00 SBT	Hans 89'	Report	Smeltz 2'; Wood 52'	Stadium: Lawson Tama Stadium; Attendance: 3,000; Referee: Bruce George (Vanuatu)

6 June 2012 2012 OFC Nations Cup GS	Papua New Guinea	1–1	Fiji	Honiara, Solomon Islands
12:00 SBT	Jack 85'	Report	Singh 13'	Stadium: Lawson Tama Stadium; Attendance: 3,000; Referee: Kader Zitouni (Tahiti)

== Honours ==
Papua New Guinea

- OFC Nations Cup: runner-up, 2016
