= Godfrey Baniau =

Papua New Guinean footballer

Personal information
- Full name: Godfrey Baniau
- Date of birth: 28 February 1977 (age 49)
- Place of birth: Papua New Guinea
- Position: Goalkeeper

Senior career*
Years	Team	Apps	(Gls)
2004–2009	Nabasa United	?	(?)
2009–	Hekari United Port Moresby		

International career
2004 & 2012	Papua New Guinea	2	(0)
- * Club domestic league appearances and goals

Godfrey Baniau (born 28 February 1977) is a Papua New Guinean footballer who plays as a goalkeeper. He has won one cap for the Papua New Guinea national football team.

Baniau was first called up to the national team in 2004.

== Honours ==
Madang

- Papua New Guinea FA Cup: 2003
