= Unitech F.C. =

Unitech
- Full name: Tukoko University (Unitech) Football Club
- Founded: 1994
- League: Papua New Guinea National Soccer League

Unitech FC, known in the Papua New Guinea National Soccer League as Tukoko University Lae FC, was a semi-professional soccer club based in Lae, Papua New Guinea. The club was founded in around 1994. It represented the Papua New Guinea University of Technology.

The club was the second ever Papua New Guinea side to take part in an Oceania Football Confederation (OFC) event, having qualified for the 2001 Oceania Club Championship after winning the 2000 Papua New Guinea National Club Championship. The side also competed in three editions of the National Soccer League, and were champions of the Lahi Regional League on four occasions between 2001 and 2008.

== History ==
=== Foundation and early years ===
The club was founded in 1994, but records of their domestic activity do not begin until 1998, when they entered the Lahi Regional League and finished 4th. In 1999, the side finished top of the regular season table in Lahi, which qualified them for the 2000 National Club Championship, although the club failed to reach the Grand Final of that year's regional competition after a disappointing knockout performance.

Between 14–17 September 2000, the club took part in the National Club Championship, being drawn into Pool D and winning two and drawing one of their three matches, successfully enjoying passage to the knockout stage. The club beat Rapatona and Mopi before facing Guria Lahi in the Grand Final, triumphing 3–2 in a result which would see them qualify for the 2001 Oceania Club Championship. Later that year, they were beaten 1–0 by Sobou FC in the Grand Final of the Lahi Regional League.

=== Continental debut and first regional title ===
2001 was a landmark year for the club, as they became the first ever Papua New Guinean club to represent the country on a continental level. At the 2001 Oceania Club Championship, which was held in Port Moresby from 9–22 January 2001, the club was drawn into the group A alongside eventual champions Wollongong Wolves, New Zealanders Napier City Rovers, Laugu United from the Solomon Islands, Labasa of Fiji and Lotoha'apai from Tonga. The club won twice, 5–2 against Lotoha'apai and 3–1 versus Labasa, and managed to contain Napier City to just 2 goals in a 2–0 defeat, but collapsed against Wollogong Wolves (6–0) and Laugu United (8–2) to finish 4th in the group.

After finishing the regular season in second place, on 7 October 2001, the side played against Sobou FC in the Grand Final of the 2001 Lahi Regional League. The club picked up their first ever regional title with a 2–0 victory over five-time champions Sobou. The side were due to play in the 2001 National Club Championship later that month, but withdrew for unknown reasons.

=== Regional consistency ===
Between the years of 2002 and 2008, the club finished in the top three of the Lahi Regional League in every single season – excluding 2006, when the league was suspended midway through the season. The side picked up championships in 2003, 2005 and 2008, beating Sobou FC in each of their Grand Final victories. They also finished runners-up in 2002, when they were unable to field a team to face Sobou in that year's final.

The side also took part in the National Club Championships in 2002, 2003 and 2004. Their best result during this period came in 2003, when they finished runners-up, losing 1–0 to Sobou FC on 16 September 2003.

=== National Soccer League participation ===
Following the side's fourth regional title, on 26 August 2009 it was announced that the side would be entering the fourth edition of the Papua New Guinea National Soccer League, with the side adopting the name Tukoko University – 'tukoko' meaning 'eagle' in the Kote language of Finschhafen – for the duration of their time in NSL competition. Despite some tough defeats, including a 6–2 opening day defeat against Rapatona and a 5–1 loss to champions Hekari United, the side were in contention for the playoffs at the halfway stage. However, in the penultimate round of fixtures, their playoff hopes were ended by Hekari, after the champions and league leaders defeated them 3–1; a final day victory over Gelle Hills was not enough to see them finish any higher than sixth.

The side entered the 2010–11 season backed for the second consecutive season by local company Niugini Building Supplies. Despite winning just three matches, the side finished third out of seven sides, qualifying for the semi-finals. However, they were unable to get past second-placed Eastern Stars, who defeated them 3–1. The club were due to play Besta PNG United in the third-place playoff, but the match was not played. It is implied that Tukoko secured third place overall by virtue of their higher league position in comparison to Besta PNG.

On the opening day of the 2011–12 season, the side lost 3–1 against newcomers Bulolo United, a result which would reflect another semi-consistent season, in which clubs faced each other three times over the course of the season, rather than twice. The side ended up in fifth place in the regular season table, but entered the knockout stages nevertheless, although it is unclear why. The side came up against reigning champions and Minor Premiers Hekari United, and despite fighting hard, went down 3–1. In the third-place playoff, the side took Besta PNG all the way to a penalty shoot-out before losing 4–3 after the spot kicks.

=== Withdrawal from NSL ===
Ahead of the 2013 National Soccer League season, it was revealed that the side, along with several other franchises, had yet to complete the documentation in order to participate. When the list of confirmed teams was revealed, Unitech were not among those listed.

By June 2013, the side competed in the Lae Regional League. In December 2017, it was suggested that the side may be returning for the 2018 National Soccer League competition, but their participation never materialised.

== Honours ==
=== National competitions ===
- Papua New Guinea National Club Championship
  - Champions (1): 2000
  - Runners-up (1): 2003
- Papua New Guinea National Soccer League
  - Third place (1): 2010–11

=== Regional competitions ===
- Lahi Regional League
  - Champions (4): 2001, 2003, 2005, 2008
  - Runners-up (2): 2000, 2002
  - Third place (3): 1999, 2004, 2007
