= Wira Wama =

Papua New Guinean footballer (born 1989)

Personal information
- Date of birth: 24 October 1989 (age 37)
- Place of birth: Papua New Guinea
- Position: Midfielder

Senior career*
Years	Team	Apps	(Gls)
2010–2013	Hekari United		
2013–2016	Maranatha Baptist University	68	(43)
2016–2025	Hekari United		

International career
2014–2024	Papua New Guinea		
Medal record
Men's football
Representing Papua New Guinea
OFC Nations Cup
Runner-up	2016 Papua New Guinea
- * Club domestic league appearances and goals

Wira Wama (born 24 October 1989) is a Papua New Guinean former professional footballer who played as a midfielder. Besides Papua New Guinea, he has played in the United States.

== Honours ==
Papua New Guinea

- OFC Nations Cup: runner-up, 2016
