= 2014 OFC U-20 Championship squads =

The 2014 OFC U-20 Championship took place between 23 and 31 May in Fiji. The squad listings were published by the OFC U-20 Championship programme.

== American Samoa ==
Head coach: Rupeni Luvu

| No. | Pos. | Player | Date of birth (age) | Club |
|---|---|---|---|---|
| 1 | GK | Frederick Maiava | 15 March 1996 (aged 18) | |
| 2 | DF | Johnny Sione (C) | 4 January 1996 (aged 18) | |
| 3 | DF | Ne'emia Kaleopa | 9 May 1996 (aged 18) | (American Samoa) Pago Youth |
| 4 | DF | Paul Collins | 31 May 1997 (aged 17) | (American Samoa) Lion Heart |
| 5 | DF | Paia Ipiniu | 21 June 1996 (aged 17) | |
| 6 | MF | Sam Kome | 5 June 1996 (aged 17) | (American Samoa) Lion Heart |
| 7 | DF | Ruben Luvu | 12 December 1996 (aged 17) | |
| 8 | FW | Raphael Rocha | 12 February 1995 (aged 19) | (American Samoa) Atu'u Broncos |
| 9 | FW | Ryan Paaga | 17 December 1995 (aged 18) | |
| 10 | FW | Sinisa Tua | 28 September 1996 (aged 17) | |
| 11 | DF | Falaai Kerisiano | 1 March 1995 (aged 19) | |
| 12 | MF | Kaleopa Siligi | 26 March 1996 (aged 18) | (American Samoa) Utulei Youth |
| 13 | DF | Fala Levaula | 30 March 1995 (aged 19) | |
| 14 | MF | Tokilupelekina Afu | 20 April 1998 (aged 16) | |
| 15 | MF | David Alo | 30 December 1995 (aged 18) | |
| 16 | MF | Lotupo Lameta | 6 August 1998 (aged 15) | |
| 17 | MF | Henry Lameta | 27 August 1996 (aged 17) | |
| 18 | DF | Toko Vaieli | 30 June 1995 (aged 18) | |
| 23 | GK | Sione Moeaki | 6 February 1998 (aged 16) | |

== New Caledonia ==
Head coach: Kamali Fitialeata

| No. | Pos. | Player | Date of birth (age) | Club |
|---|---|---|---|---|
| 1 | GK | Yoran Waima | 25 March 1995 (aged 19) | (New Caledonia) AS Mont-Dore |
| 2 | DF | Brandon Meaou | 8 May 1996 (aged 18) | |
| 3 | DF | Jordy Kausuo | 8 February 1995 (aged 19) | |
| 4 | DF | Pierre Kauma (C) | 4 August 1995 (aged 18) | (New Caledonia) AS Lossi |
| 5 | DF | Theo Jalabert | 22 December 1996 (aged 17) | (New Caledonia) AS Mont-Dore |
| 6 | | Jorys Lalie | 25 July 1995 (aged 18) | |
| 7 | MF | Jim Ouka | 25 June 1996 (aged 17) | (New Caledonia) AS Lossi |
| 8 | MF | Mickaël Partodikromo | 2 February 1996 (aged 18) | (England) Sheffield United |
| 9 | FW | Raphael Oiremoin | 22 May 1995 (aged 19) | |
| 10 | MF | Joseph Athale | 11 July 1995 (aged 18) | (New Caledonia) Gaïtcha FCN |
| 11 | FW | Valentin Nykeine | 28 September 1996 (aged 17) | |
| 12 | MF | Didier Simane | 3 August 1996 (aged 17) | (New Caledonia) Qanono Sport |
| 13 | DF | Eugene Sakilia | 7 May 1996 (aged 18) | |
| 14 | | Frederic Nemia | 30 January 1995 (aged 19) | |
| 15 | MF | Johan Idrele | 29 January 1995 (aged 19) | (New Caledonia) AS Wetr |
| 16 | MF | Jacky Wetewea | 6 February 1997 (aged 17) | |
| 17 | | Jacky Weinane | 19 May 1995 (aged 19) | |
| 18 | MF | Bi Iritie | 31 October 1995 (aged 18) | (England) AFC Wimbledon |
| 19 | | Marion Waru | 22 February 1995 (aged 19) | |
| 20 | GK | Thomas Schmidt | 4 June 1996 (aged 17) | |
| 21 | FW | Josue Wathiepel | 17 November 1995 (aged 18) | |

== Fiji ==
Head coach: Ravinesh Kumar

| No. | Pos. | Player | Date of birth (age) | Club |
|---|---|---|---|---|
| 1 | GK | Misiwani Nairube | 22 February 1996 (aged 18) | (Fiji) Ba |
| 2 | DF | Praneel Naidu | 21 January 1995 (aged 19) | (Fiji) Ba |
| 3 | MF | Garish Prasad | 1 February 1995 (aged 19) | |
| 4 | DF | Jale Dreloa (C) | 21 April 1995 (aged 19) | (Fiji) Suva |
| 5 | DF | Antonio Tuivana | 20 March 1995 (aged 19) | (Fiji) Labasa |
| 6 | DF | Mohammed Khan | 8 November 1995 (aged 18) | |
| 7 | MF | Nikel Chand | 28 July 1995 (aged 18) | |
| 8 | MF | Setareki Hughes | 8 June 1995 (aged 18) | (Fiji) Rewa |
| 9 | FW | Samuela Nabenia | 16 February 1995 (aged 19) | (Fiji) Ba |
| 10 | MF | Narendra Rao | 27 June 1995 (aged 18) | (Fiji) Ba |
| 11 | DF | Joseva Koroi | 13 July 1996 (aged 17) | |
| 12 | MF | Tevita Waranaivalu | 16 September 1995 (aged 18) | (Fiji) Rewa |
| 13 | DF | Mataiasi Toma | 14 June 1997 (aged 16) | (Fiji) Nadi |
| 14 | MF | Ravnit Chand | 31 January 1996 (aged 18) | |
| 15 | FW | Saula Waqa | 12 October 1995 (aged 18) | (Fiji) Ba |
| 16 | MF | Jonetani Buksh | 2 July 1996 (aged 17) | (Fiji) Ba |
| 17 | DF | Kolinio Sivoki | 10 March 1995 (aged 19) | (Fiji) Suva |
| 18 | MF | Al-Taaf Sahib | 12 September 1995 (aged 18) | (New Zealand) Auckland United |
| 19 | FW | Ashnil Raju | 27 July 1995 (aged 18) | |
| 20 | GK | Shaneel Naidu | 28 March 1995 (aged 19) | |

== Papua New Guinea ==
Head coach: (New Zealand) Wynton Rufer

| No. | Pos. | Player | Date of birth (age) | Caps | Goals | Club |
|---|---|---|---|---|---|---|
| 1 | GK | Koniel Vagi | 26 October 1996 (age 28) | 2 | 0 | (Papua New Guinea) Gigira Laitepo Morobe |
| 20 | GK | Jimmy Gibson | 31 August 1995 (age 29) | 4 | 0 | (Papua New Guinea) Lae City Dwellers |
| 2 | DF | Abel Redenut | 27 April 1995 (age 30) | 3 | 0 | (Papua New Guinea) FC Port Moresby |
| 3 | DF | Jonel Kambual | 9 April 1996 (age 29) | 3 | 0 | (Papua New Guinea) Nabasa |
| 4 | DF | Ayrton Yagas | 7 March 1996 (age 29) | 6 | 1 | (Papua New Guinea) FC Port Moresby |
| 7 | DF | Isaac Lalo | 1 January 1995 (age 30) | 3 | 0 | (Papua New Guinea) Lae City Dwellers |
| 8 | DF | Joshua Talau | 19 April 1996 (age 29) | 2 | 0 | (Papua New Guinea) Besta United PNG |
| 6 | MF | Felix Komolong (c) | 6 March 1997 (age 28) | 4 | 0 | (Papua New Guinea) Madang Fox |
| 9 | MF | Papalau Awele | 1 February 1995 (age 30) | 8 | 2 | (Papua New Guinea) Besta United PNG |
| 10 | MF | Steven Inia | 3 April 1996 (age 29) | 5 | 0 | (Papua New Guinea) Besta United PNG |
| 11 | MF | Peter Dabinyaba Jr. | 23 March 1997 (age 28) | 4 | 0 | (Papua New Guinea) Lae City Dwellers |
| 12 | MF | Nigel Malagian | 5 February 1996 (age 29) | 5 | 0 | (Papua New Guinea) Madang Fox |
| 14 | MF | Freddy Tupani | 13 August 1998 (age 27) | 3 | 0 | (Papua New Guinea) PNGFA Elite Academy |
| 18 | MF | Danny Kevin | 21 December 1995 (age 29) | 3 | 0 | (Papua New Guinea) Markham |
| 5 | FW | Rodger Saking | 27 August 1995 (age 30) | 1 | 0 | (Papua New Guinea) Besta United PNG |
| 13 | FW | Maya Bob | 23 December 1996 (age 28) | 2 | 1 | (Papua New Guinea) Panamex |
| 15 | FW | Nicky Benjamin | 21 December 1996 (age 28) | 3 | 0 | (Papua New Guinea) Besta United PNG |
| 16 | FW | Randol Bongi | 30 August 1997 (age 28) | 4 | 0 | (Papua New Guinea) Wau |
| 17 | FW | Ferdahlas Namuesh | 15 July 1996 (age 29) | 4 | 0 | (Papua New Guinea) Besta United PNG |
| 19 | FW | Frederick Simongi | 18 October 1995 (age 29) | 5 | 2 | (Papua New Guinea) Bugandi |

== Solomon Islands ==
Head coach: Commins Menapi

| No. | Pos. | Player | Date of birth (age) | Club |
|---|---|---|---|---|
| 1 | GK | Philip Mango (C) | 28 August 1995 (aged 18) | (Solomon Islands) Western United |
| 2 | DF | Rollence Misitana | 6 May 1995 (aged 19) | |
| 3 | DF | Simon Daoi | 24 February 1995 (aged 19) | |
| 4 | DF | Loea Lemix | 17 November 1995 (aged 18) | |
| 5 | DF | Misitana Samani | 5 February 1995 (aged 19) | |
| 6 | DF | Alffie Chacha | 21 September 1995 (aged 18) | |
| 7 | MF | Edmond Taevo | 3 August 1997 (aged 16) | |
| 8 | FW | Joachim Kairi | 10 April 1995 (aged 19) | |
| 9 | FW | Dunstan Quanafia | 25 June 1995 (aged 18) | |
| 10 | MF | Jared Rongosulia | 6 November 1995 (aged 18) | |
| 11 | | Herrick Lautalo | 10 February 1995 (aged 19) | |
| 12 | FW | Kevin Obed | 4 April 1996 (aged 18) | |
| 13 | DF | Fred Bala | 10 July 1995 (aged 18) | |
| 14 | MF | Atkin Kaua | 4 April 1996 (aged 18) | (Solomon Islands) Western United |
| 15 | | Leslie Ramo | 13 September 1995 (aged 18) | |
| 16 | MF | Timothy Bunabo | 5 November 1995 (aged 18) | |
| 17 | | Brett Honisawa | 24 June 1996 (aged 17) | |
| 18 | DF | Allen Peter | 15 September 1995 (aged 18) | (Solomon Islands) Malaita Kingz |
| 19 | MF | Timothy Bakale | 29 March 1995 (aged 19) | (Solomon Islands) Western United |
| 20 | GK | James Do’oro | 19 June 1996 (aged 17) | |

== Vanuatu ==
Head coach: Etienne Mermer

| No. | Pos. | Player | Date of birth (age) | Club |
|---|---|---|---|---|
| 1 | GK | Charlie Waivui | 8 February 1996 (aged 18) | (Vanuatu) Tafea |
| 2 | DF | Jason Thomas (C) | 20 January 1997 (aged 17) | (Vanuatu) Erakor Golden Star |
| 3 | DF | Goshen Dona | 27 August 1996 (aged 17) | (Vanuatu) Amicale |
| 4 | DF | Alphonse Lency | 21 March 1996 (aged 18) | |
| 5 | DF | Joseph Iaruel | 25 January 1998 (aged 16) | |
| 6 | DF | Remy Kalsarap | 20 January 1996 (aged 18) | (Vanuatu) Erakor Golden Star |
| 7 | DF | Elie Melite Rossi | 9 January 1996 (aged 18) | |
| 8 | MF | Justin Koka | 5 May 1996 (aged 18) | (Vanuatu) Tafea |
| 9 | FW | Tony Kaltack | 5 November 1996 (aged 17) | (Vanuatu) Erakor Golden Star |
| 10 | MF | Bong Kalo | 18 January 1997 (aged 17) | (Vanuatu) Tafea |
| 11 | FW | Alex Saniel | 8 November 1996 (aged 17) | (Vanuatu) Ifira Black Bird |
| 12 | MF | Andre Bule | 29 August 1996 (aged 17) | |
| 13 | FW | Ruben Frank | 7 October 1996 (aged 17) | (Vanuatu) Shepherds United |
| 14 | MF | Gershom Kalsong | 23 April 1995 (aged 19) | (Vanuatu) Erakor Golden Star |
| 15 | MF | Etienne Naieu | 13 February 1996 (aged 18) | |
| 16 | MF | Jacky Ruben | 10 November 1996 (aged 17) | (Vanuatu) Erakor Golden Star |
| 17 | FW | Sam Iwai | 15 March 1996 (aged 18) | |
| 18 | DF | Kerry Iawak | 16 March 1996 (aged 18) | (Vanuatu) Spirit 08 |
| 19 | MF | Renold Iwai | 31 May 1996 (aged 18) | |
| 24 | GK | Ricky Dick | 17 October 1998 (aged 15) | (Vanuatu) Shepherds United |
