= Football at the 2016 Summer Olympics – Men's tournament – Group C =

Group C of the men's football tournament at the 2016 Summer Olympics was played from 4 to 10 August 2016, and included Fiji, Germany, Mexico and South Korea. The top two teams advanced to the knockout stage.

All times are BRT (UTC−3).

== Teams ==
Draw position	Team	Confederation	Method of qualification	Date of qualification	Olympic appearance	Last appearance	Previous best performance
C1	Fiji	OFC	Pacific Games 1st place	12 July 2015	1st	—	—
C2	South Korea	AFC	AFC U-23 Championship 2nd place	26 January 2016	10th	2012	Bronze medal (2012)
C3	Mexico	CONCACAF	CONCACAF Qualifying 1st place	10 October 2015	11th	2012	Gold medal (2012)
C4	Germany	UEFA	UEFA Under-21 Championship semi-finalists	23 June 2015	9th	1988	Bronze medal (1988)

== Standings ==
Pos	Team	Pld	W	D	L	GF	GA	GD	Pts	Qualification
1	South Korea	3	2	1	0	12	3	+9	7	Quarter-finals
2	Germany	3	1	2	0	15	5	+10	5	Quarter-finals
3	Mexico	3	1	1	1	7	4	+3	4	
4	Fiji	3	0	0	3	1	23	−22	0	

Source: Rio2016 & FIFA
Rules for classification: Tiebreakers

== Matches ==
=== Mexico vs Germany ===
4 August 2016
17:00

Mexico	2–2	Germany
Peralta 52'; Pizarro 60'	Report (Rio2016); Report (FIFA)	Gnabry 58'; Ginter 78'

Itaipava Arena Fonte Nova, Salvador
Attendance: 16,500
Referee: Alireza Faghani (Iran)

Mexico	Germany

GK	1	Alfredo Talavera
DF	2	José Abella
DF	4	César Montes
DF	6	Jorge Torres Nilo
DF	13	Carlos Salcedo
MF	5	Michael Pérez
MF	7	Rodolfo Pizarro	(substituted off) 81'
MF	15	Erick Gutiérrez
FW	8	Hirving Lozano	(substituted off) 83'
FW	9	Oribe Peralta (c)	(substituted off) 74'
FW	11	Marco Bueno
Substitutions:
FW	18	Erick Torres	(substituted on) 74'
FW	16	Carlos Cisneros	(substituted on) 81'
DF	10	Víctor Guzmán	(substituted on) 83'
Manager:
Raúl Gutiérrez

GK	1	Timo Horn
DF	2	Jeremy Toljan
DF	3	Lukas Klostermann
DF	4	Matthias Ginter
DF	5	Niklas Süle
MF	6	Sven Bender
MF	7	Max Meyer		(substituted off) 89'
MF	8	Lars Bender	(yellow card) 26'
MF	10	Leon Goretzka (c)		(substituted off) 28'
MF	11	Julian Brandt
FW	9	Davie Selke		(substituted off) 84'
Substitutions:
MF	17	Serge Gnabry		(substituted on) 28'
FW	18	Nils Petersen		(substituted on) 84'
MF	15	Max Christiansen		(substituted on) 89'
Manager:
Horst Hrubesch

Assistant referees:
Reza Sokhandan (Iran)
Mohammadreza Mansouri (Iran)
Fourth official:
Ovidiu Hațegan (Romania)

=== Fiji vs South Korea ===
4 August 2016
20:00

Fiji	0–8	South Korea
	Report (Rio2016); Report (FIFA)	Ryu Seung-woo 32', 63', 90+3'; Kwon Chang-hoon 62', 63'; Son Heung-min 72' (pen.); Suk Hyun-jun 77', 90'

Itaipava Arena Fonte Nova, Salvador
Attendance: 16,000
Referee: Malang Diedhiou (Senegal)

Fiji	South Korea

GK	1	Simione Tamanisau
DF	2	Praneel Naidu
DF	3	Filipe Baravilala		(substituted off) 67'
DF	4	Jale Dreloa	(yellow card) 71'
DF	11	Alvin Singh
MF	5	Antonio Tuivuna
MF	7	Nickel Chand
MF	12	Tevita Waranaivalu		(substituted off) 79'
FW	8	Setareki Hughes		(substituted off) 67'
FW	9	Roy Krishna (c)
FW	13	Iosefo Verevou
Substitutions:
FW	6	Anish Khem		(substituted on) 67'
FW	15	Saula Waqa		(substituted on) 67'
MF	10	Ratu Nakalevu		(substituted on) 79'
Manager:
Frank Farina

GK	18	Gu Sung-yun
DF	2	Sim Sang-min
DF	3	Lee Seul-chan
DF	5	Choi Kyu-baek	(yellow card) 3'
DF	6	Jang Hyun-soo (c)
DF	15	Jeong Seung-hyun
MF	8	Moon Chang-jin
MF	10	Ryu Seung-woo
MF	16	Kwon Chang-hoon		(substituted off) 70'
MF	17	Lee Chang-min		(substituted off) 80'
FW	11	Hwang Hee-chan		(substituted off) 69'
Substitutions:
FW	9	Suk Hyun-jun		(substituted on) 69'
FW	7	Son Heung-min		(substituted on) 70'
MF	4	Kim Min-tae		(substituted on) 80'
Manager:
Shin Tae-yong

Assistant referees:
Djibril Camara (Senegal)
El Hadji Malick Samba (Senegal)
Fourth official:
Néstor Pitana (Argentina)

=== Fiji vs Mexico ===
7 August 2016
13:00

Fiji	1–5	Mexico
Krishna 10'	Report (Rio2016); Report (FIFA)	Gutiérrez 48', 55', 58', 73'; Salcedo 67'

Itaipava Arena Fonte Nova, Salvador
Attendance: 11,200
Referee: Gehad Grisha (Egypt)

Fiji	Mexico

GK	1	Simione Tamanisau
DF	2	Praneel Naidu
DF	4	Jale Dreloa
DF	11	Alvin Singh
MF	5	Antonio Tuivuna		(substituted off) 81'
MF	7	Nickel Chand
MF	10	Ratu Nakalevu	(yellow card) 36'	(substituted off) 61'
FW	6	Anish Khem	(yellow card) 70'
FW	8	Setareki Hughes		(substituted off) 70'
FW	9	Roy Krishna (c)
FW	13	Iosefo Verevou
Substitutions:
MF	12	Tevita Waranaivalu		(substituted on) 61'
FW	14	Samuela Nabenia		(substituted on) 70'
DF	3	Filipe Baravilala		(substituted on) 81'
Manager:
Frank Farina

GK	1	Alfredo Talavera
DF	2	José Abella	(yellow card) 90'
DF	4	César Montes		(substituted off) 71'
DF	6	Jorge Torres Nilo
DF	13	Carlos Salcedo
MF	5	Michael Pérez
MF	7	Rodolfo Pizarro		(substituted off) 35'
MF	15	Erick Gutiérrez
FW	8	Hirving Lozano		(substituted off) 46'
FW	9	Oribe Peralta (c)
FW	11	Marco Bueno
Substitutions:
FW	16	Carlos Cisneros		(substituted on) 35'
MF	17	Alfonso González		(substituted on) 46'
DF	14	Érick Aguirre		(substituted on) 71'
Manager:
Raúl Gutiérrez

Assistant referees:
Rédouane Achik (Morocco)
Waleed Ahmed (Sudan)
Fourth official:
Antonio Mateu Lahoz (Spain)

=== Germany vs South Korea ===
7 August 2016
16:00

Germany	3–3	South Korea
Gnabry 33', 90+2'; Selke 55'	Report (Rio2016); Report (FIFA)	Hwang Hee-chan 25'; Son Heung-min 57'; Suk Hyun-jun 87'

Itaipava Arena Fonte Nova, Salvador
Attendance: 17,121
Referee: Néstor Pitana (Argentina)

Germany	South Korea

GK	1	Timo Horn
DF	2	Jeremy Toljan
DF	3	Lukas Klostermann
DF	4	Matthias Ginter
DF	5	Niklas Süle	(yellow card) 88'
MF	6	Sven Bender
MF	7	Max Meyer (c)
MF	8	Lars Bender
MF	11	Julian Brandt
MF	17	Serge Gnabry
FW	9	Davie Selke		(substituted off) 83'
Substitutions:
FW	18	Nils Petersen		(substituted on) 83'
Manager:
Horst Hrubesch

GK	1	Kim Dong-jun
DF	2	Sim Sang-min
DF	3	Lee Seul-chan
DF	5	Choi Kyu-baek	(substituted off) 46'
DF	6	Jang Hyun-soo (c)
DF	15	Jeong Seung-hyun
MF	8	Moon Chang-jin	(substituted off) 75'
MF	14	Park Yong-woo
MF	16	Kwon Chang-hoon	(substituted off) 82'
FW	7	Son Heung-min
FW	11	Hwang Hee-chan
Substitutions:
MF	12	Lee Chan-dong	(substituted on) 46'
FW	9	Suk Hyun-jun	(substituted on) 75'
MF	10	Ryu Seung-woo	(substituted on) 82'
Manager:
Shin Tae-yong

Assistant referees:
Hernán Maidana (Argentina)
Juan Pablo Belatti (Argentina)
Fourth official:
Sandro Ricci (Brazil)

=== Germany vs Fiji ===
10 August 2016
16:00

Germany	10–0	Fiji
Gnabry 8', 45'; Petersen 14', 33', 40', 63' (pen.), 70'; Meyer 30', 49', 52'	Report (Rio2016); Report (FIFA)

Mineirão, Belo Horizonte
Attendance: 16,521
Referee: Fahad Al-Mirdasi (Saudi Arabia)

Germany	Fiji

GK	1	Timo Horn
DF	2	Jeremy Toljan	(substituted off) 46'
DF	3	Lukas Klostermann	(substituted off) 46'
DF	5	Niklas Süle
MF	6	Sven Bender
MF	7	Max Meyer (c)
MF	8	Lars Bender
MF	11	Julian Brandt
MF	15	Max Christiansen	(substituted off) 67'
MF	17	Serge Gnabry
FW	18	Nils Petersen
Substitutions:
DF	13	Philipp Max	(substituted on) 46'
DF	14	Robert Bauer	(substituted on) 46'
MF	16	Grischa Prömel	(substituted on) 67'
Manager:
Horst Hrubesch

GK	1	Simione Tamanisau	(yellow card) 57'
DF	2	Praneel Naidu
DF	4	Jale Dreloa
DF	11	Alvin Singh	(yellow card) 62'
MF	7	Nickel Chand
MF	10	Ratu Nakalevu		(substituted off) 46'
MF	12	Tevita Waranaivalu
FW	6	Anish Khem		(substituted off) 67'
FW	8	Setareki Hughes	(yellow card) 73'
FW	9	Roy Krishna (c)
FW	13	Iosefo Verevou		(substituted off) 67'
Substitutions:
DF	3	Filipe Baravilala		(substituted on) 46'
FW	14	Samuela Nabenia		(substituted on) 67'
MF	16	Joseph Turagabeci		(substituted on) 67'
Manager:
Frank Farina

Assistant referees:
Abdullah Al-Shalwai (Saudi Arabia)
Mohammed Al-Abakry (Saudi Arabia)
Fourth official:
Ryuji Sato (Japan)

=== South Korea vs Mexico ===
10 August 2016
16:00

South Korea	1–0	Mexico
Kwon Chang-hoon 73'	Report (Rio2016); Report (FIFA)

Estádio Nacional Mané Garrincha, Brasília
Attendance: 19,332
Referee: Clément Turpin (France)

South Korea	Mexico

GK	18	Gu Sung-yun	(yellow card) 83'
DF	2	Sim Sang-min
DF	3	Lee Seul-chan	(yellow card) 61'
DF	6	Jang Hyun-soo (c)
DF	15	Jeong Seung-hyun
MF	10	Ryu Seung-woo		(substituted off) 71'
MF	14	Park Yong-woo
MF	16	Kwon Chang-hoon		(substituted off) 90+2'
MF	17	Lee Chang-min		(substituted off) 55'
FW	7	Son Heung-min
FW	11	Hwang Hee-chan	(yellow card) 90+4'
Substitutions:
MF	12	Lee Chan-dong	(yellow card) 69'	(substituted on) 55'
FW	9	Suk Hyun-jun		(substituted on) 71'
MF	4	Kim Min-tae		(substituted on) 90+2'
Manager:
Shin Tae-yong

GK	1	Alfredo Talavera (c)
DF	4	César Montes
DF	6	Jorge Torres Nilo		(substituted off) 80'
DF	14	Erick Aguirre
DF	13	Carlos Salcedo	(yellow card) 90'
MF	5	Michael Pérez
MF	15	Erick Gutiérrez
MF	17	Alfonso González		(substituted off) 51'
FW	11	Marco Bueno		(substituted off) 69'
FW	16	Carlos Cisneros
FW	18	Erick Torres
Substitutions:
MF	8	Hirving Lozano	(yellow card) 72' (yellow-red card) 90+4'	(substituted on) 51'
DF	20	Raúl López		(substituted on) 69'
FW	21	Carlos Fierro		(substituted on) 80'
Manager:
Raúl Gutiérrez

Assistant referees:
Frédéric Cano (France)
Nicolas Danos (France)
Fourth official:
Sergei Karasev (Russia)
