= 2019–20 Papua New Guinea National Soccer League =

Papua New Guinea National Soccer League
- Season: 2019–20
- Dates: 14 December 2019 – 10 October 2020
- Champions: Lae City
- Premiers: Lae City
- 2021 OFC Champions League: Lae City; Hekari United
- Matches: 94
- Best Player: Emmanuel Simon
- Top goalscorer: Jonathan Allen (12 goals)

The 2019–20 Papua New Guinea National Soccer League, for sponsorship reasons also known as the Kumul Petroleum Holdings Limited National Soccer League, was the 14th edition of the Papua New Guinea National Soccer League, the top-tier soccer league in Papua New Guinea. The league began on 14 December 2019, after being postponed three times due to late registration fees, and finished on 10 October 2020, after almost a five-month hiatus due to the COVID-19 pandemic.

Lae City were the defending champions, having won their fifth title with a penalty shoot-out victory over eight-time champions Hekari United in the 2019 edition. The side picked up their sixth title with a 1–0 victory over newcomers Vitiaz United in the Grand Final after topping the regular season table. Hekari United had to settle for third after Vitiaz defeated them on penalties in the semi-finals. Emmanuel Simon of Lae City won the Player of the Season Award, while Jonathan Allen, who spent the first half the season at FC Bougainville and the second half at Vitiaz United, was awarded the Golden Boot after scoring 12 goals in the regular season.

== Format ==
Following the successful management of the previous season, which involved 27 teams spread across all four regions of the country, PNGFA president John Kapi Natto suggested that the following season may be the first to have two connected divisions of football in the nation, with six to eight teams in a top-level 'elite' competition, and any number of teams competing in regional divisions a level below. Lae City manager Peter Gunemba praised this idea.

In October 2019, it was confirmed that Kapi Natto intended to go ahead with an eight-team National Soccer League, taking place alongside a 'Premier Men's Conference', with four conferences representing the four regions of the country: Northern (Momase), Southern (Papua), Highlands and Islands. The national league was expanded to ten in December 2019, following the cancellation of the conference competition in late November due to lack of interest.

== Teams ==
On 27 November 2019, a new club, FC Kutubu, from Kutubu, were the first team to be officially confirmed ahead of the new season. It was suggested that the side would be the only club representing the Highlands Region in the new season. On 5 December, reigning champions Lae City, eight-time champions Hekari United, and Port Moresby-based FC Bougainville were also confirmed. On 10 December 2019, the remaining six teams were confirmed.

This was the first season since 2009–10 that Besta PNG United did not participate in the competition.

Papua New Guinea National Soccer League 2019–20
Team	Region	Previous Best	Other Honours	Stadium	Capacity
Hekari United	Southern	2006–14: Champions (8x)	2009–10 OFC Champions League: Champions 2017 National Premier League: Champions 2007 Port Moresby Premier League: Champions	PNG Football Stadium	14,800
Lae City (name changed from Toti City)	Northern	2015–19: Champions (5x)	2018, 2019 OFC Champions League: Quarter-Finalists	Sir Ignatius Kilage Stadium	1,500
Morobe United	Northern	2009–10: Runners-up	1998 National Club Championship: Runners-Up 2001, 2005 Lae Regional Championship: Champions	LFA Park	10,000
Morobe Wawens	Northern	2018: 3rd	None	Sir Ignatius Kilage Stadium	1,500
Gulf Komara	Southern	2015–16: Southern Conference: 4th	2018 National Premier League: Champions		
FC Bougainville	Southern	2019: Southern Conference: 4th	None		
Star Mountain	Southern	2019: Southern Conference: 7th	1999 North Fly District: Champions		
Tusbab Stallions	Northern	2019: Northern Conference: 8th	None		
Vitiaz United	Southern	N/A	2019 Port Moresby Division One: Champions	Laiwaden Oval	1,000
FC Kutubu	Highlands	N/A	None		

== Summary ==
The season ran relatively smoothly compared to previous seasons, aside from an enforced break of almost five months due to the COVID-19 pandemic which halted the season just after the halfway stage in March. By this time, three contenders for the title had emerged. Newcomers Vitiaz United sat top of the league place, having beaten Lae City 2–1 on 25 January and drawn with Hekari, and only having suffered defeat at the hands of FC Bougainville. Reigning champions Lae City sat second after ten games despite manager Peter Gunemba being sacked following their exit from the 2020 OFC Champions League, and the resultant mass exodus of players, including international veterans Raymond Gunemba and Nigel Dabinyaba, who eventually joined Hekari United. Eight-time champions Hekari United were third, having gone the entire first half of the season unbeaten before suffering a shock 2–1 defeat against Star Mountain in the first game of the second half of the season, which saw them slip from first to third. The final playoff spot was held by Tusbab Stallions, who were well off the pace of the top three but had a comfortable points cushion over the chasing pack. The league was halted on 14 March 2020.

Vitiaz kept up the strong pace they had set following the restart on 8 August 2020. They opened with a 2–2 draw with Star Mountain, before new signing from Lae City, Mathew David, scored seven goals in two games – all three in a 3–0 win over Morobe Wawens and four in a 6–3 defeat of Tusbab Stallions – but the final three weeks of the regular season saw them fall to third, with narrow 1–0 defeats to FC Bougainville and Gulf Komara on consecutive weeks followed by a 0–0 draw against eventual Minor Premiers Lae City on the final day. Hekari lost 1–0 to Lae City on 15 August, and were unable to recover the deficit, eventually finishing second in the regular season table behind the reigning champions, who went unbeaten in the second half of the season. The final playoff spot went to Gulf Komara, who leapfrogged a stuttering Tusbab Stallions on the final day with a 5–0 win over Star Mountain.

In the playoffs, Gulf Komara ran Lae City close in the first semi-final before eventually losing 2–1, before Vitiaz United and Hekari United battled out a 2–2 after extra time in the second semi-final, with Vitiaz triumphing on penalties. After Hekari claimed third place after thrashing Gulf Komara 5–0, Lae City won a tight Grand Final with a solitary goal from Obert Bika to claim their sixth successive title.

== Regular season ==
=== League table ===
Pos	Team	Pld	W	D	L	GF	GA	GD	Pts	Qualification or relegation
1	Lae City (Q)	18	13	4	1	53	15	+38	43	Qualification to OFC Champions League group stage and Playoffs
2	Hekari United (Q)	18	13	3	2	39	10	+29	42	Qualification to Playoffs
3	Vitiaz United (Q)	18	11	4	3	32	17	+15	37	Qualification to Playoffs
4	Gulf Komara (Q)	18	8	1	9	27	28	−1	25	Qualification to Playoffs
5	FC Bougainville	18	7	3	8	34	33	+1	24	
6	Tusbab Stallions	18	6	4	8	27	28	−1	22	
7	Star Mountain	18	5	3	10	25	45	−20	18	
8	Morobe United	18	4	5	9	22	32	−10	17	
9	Morobe Wawens	18	5	1	12	19	38	−19	16	
10	FC Kutubu	18	3	2	13	24	56	−32	11	

(Q) Qualified for the phase indicated

=== Results ===
Home \ Away	BOU	GUK	HEK	KUT	LAE	MOU	MOW	STM	TUS	VIT
FC Bougainville	—	1–2	1–2	3–1	2–3	3–0	4–1	1–1	1–2	2–0
Gulf Komara	2–3	—	0–2	2–0	0–1	2–1	2–1	2–1	1–2	0–1
Hekari United	2–0	2–0	—	6–0	0–1	3–1	2–1	3–0	2–1	0–0
FC Kutubu	0–0	4–3	1–4	—	1–3	2–3	1–0	3–4	2–2	1–2
Lae City	9–2	5–0	1–1	8–1	—	1–1	2–0	6–1	1–1	1–2
Morobe United	2–2	1–1	0–2	1–0	1–3	—	1–3	3–0	0–0	1–2
Morobe Wawens	3–2	0–4	0–3	4–2	1–5	2–0	—	2–1	0–1	0–1
Star Mountain	3–1	0–5	2–1	2–4	1–2	2–2	3–0	—	0–5	1–3
Tusbab Stallions	0–5	3–0	0–3	5–0	0–1	1–2	1–1	0–1	—	0–2
Vitiaz United	0–1	0–1	1–1	4–1	0–0	3–2	3–0	2–2	6–3	—

Updated to match(es) played on 26 September 2020. Source:
Legend: Blue = home team win; Yellow = draw; Red = away team win.

== Playoffs ==
Semi-finals
3 October –
Lae City	2
Gulf Komara	1
3 October –
Hekari United	2 (3)
Vitiaz United (a.e.t.) (p)	2 (4)

Final
10 October –
Lae City	1
Vitiaz United	0
Third place match
10 October –
Gulf Komara	0
Hekari United	5

=== Semi-finals ===
3 October 2020

Lae City	2–1	Gulf Komara
Abdias Aguirre 1' (pen.); Emmanuel Simon 51'	Report	Rupa Emil 84'

PNG Football Stadium, Port Moresby
3 October 2020

Hekari United	2–2 (a.e.t.)	Vitiaz United
Ati Kepo 10'; Daniel Joe 81' (pen.)	Report	Yagi Yasasa 17', 36'
Penalties
Joe (penalty scored); Dabinyaba (penalty missed); Foster (penalty scored); David (penalty missed); Muta (penalty scored); Upaiga (penalty missed)	3–4	Fugre (penalty scored); David (penalty missed); Efale (penalty missed); Dabinyaba Jr (penalty scored); Yasasa (penalty scored); Sigit (penalty scored)

PNG Football Stadium, Port Moresby

=== Third-place playoff ===
10 October 2020

Hekari United	5–0	Gulf Komara
Michael Foster; Raymond Gunemba; Nigel Dabinyaba	Report

PNG Football Stadium, Port Moresby

=== Grand Final ===
10 October 2020

Lae City	1–0	Vitiaz United
Obert Bika 53'	Report

PNG Football Stadium, Port Moresby

== Season statistics ==
As of 10 October 2020

=== Top scorers ===
Rank	Player	Club	Goals
1	(Papua New Guinea) Raymond Gunemba	Lae City/Hekari United	13
2	(Papua New Guinea) Jonathan Allen	FC Bougainville/Vitiaz United	12
3	(Papua New Guinea) Stahl Gubag	Tusbab Stallions/Lae City	11
4	(Papua New Guinea) Mathew David	Lae City/Vitiaz United	10
5	(Papua New Guinea) Nigel Dabinyaba	Lae City/Hekari United	9
