= Bakale =

Bakale is a surname. Notable people with this surname include:

- Emile Bakale (born 1987), Congolese swimmer
- Monika Bakale (born 1979), Congolese swimmer
- Timothy Bakale (born 1995), Solomon Islands footballer
