= Paul Collins (American Samoan footballer) =

American Samoan footballer

Personal information
- Full name: Paul Collins
- Date of birth: May 31, 1997 (age 29)
- Place of birth: American Samoa
- Height: 1.89 m (6 ft 2 in)
- Position: Defender

Team information
- Current team: Pago Youth
- Number: 12

Senior career*
Years	Team	Apps	(Gls)
2012–2015	Lion Hearts		
2015–2017	Utulei Youth		
2017–	Pago Youth		

International career^{‡}
2013	American Samoa U17	3	(0)
2014	American Samoa U20	8	(0)
2015–	American Samoa	2	(0)
- * Club domestic league appearances and goals ‡ National team caps and goals as of 10 September 2015

Paul Collins (born 31 May 1997) is an American Samoan footballer who plays as a defender for Pago Youth in the FFAS Senior League and the American Samoa national football team.

== Club career ==
Collins started his career with Lion Heart. In 2015, he moved to Utulei Youth. With this club he won the 2015 FFAS Senior League which meant that they qualified for the 2016 OFC Champions League preliminary stage. During this preliminary round Collins played all 3 games. He also scored 1 goal, against Kiwi from Samoa.

== International career ==
=== U17 ===
In 2013 Collins was called up to play with the American Samoa national under-17 football team in the 2013 OFC U-17 Championship preliminary round. He played all 3 matches during this competition. They eventually reached a second spot, before Samoa and Tonga. Although this was a very good result for American Samoa they failed to qualify for the main stage.

=== U20 ===
In 2014 Collins, just 16 years old, joined the U20's for the 2014 OFC U-20 Championship in Fiji. Collins played all five matches including games against Pacific giants like Vanuatu and New Caledonia. 4 of those 5 matches went for a loss but against Papua New Guinea they played 1–1. A historical draw for American Samoa. In 2016, he was named captain of the U20's for the 2016 OFC U-20 Championship preliminary round in Tonga. This ended as a disappointment for Collins and his teammates as they got only 1 point out of 3 games.

=== National team ===
Collins made his debut for the American Samoa national football team in a friendly match against Fiji on August 27, 2015, which ended in 6–0 loss. Collins played his second game in a 3–2 loss against Samoa during the First Qualification Round for the 2018 World Cup.

== Career statistics ==
=== International ===
American Samoa
Year	Apps	Goals
2015	2	0
Total	2	0

Statistics accurate as of match played 10 September 2015

== Honours ==
=== Individual honours ===
- MVP of Men's U-17 division of the 2015 FFAS 5-A-Side League
