= Tusbab Stallions F.C. =

Association football club in Papua New Guinea

Tusbab Stallions
- Full name: Tusbab Stallions Football Club
- Founded: 2019; 7 years ago
- Manager: Rachel Wadunah

Tusbab Stallions are a professional football club established in 2019 and based in Madang, Papua New Guinea. The club debuted in the 2019–20 Papua New Guinea National Soccer League.

== History ==
The club was established in 2019 as successor of an amateur club dating back to 2004 of the same name, which itself was founded after a merge between two separate Madang-based clubs, Tusbab and Blue Kumuls. The amateur side had won the Madang Soccer Association Grand Final in 2018, prior to their move to semi-professional status.

On 11 January 2019, the side was confirmed into the 2019 National Soccer League, and had been drawn into the Northern Conference. They won their opening fixture with a 1–0 victory over Laiwaden FC. By the halfway stage of the season, the side sat fifth out of eight sides in the conference, having won two games and drawn one. The second half of their season was poor, with the side picking up just one more point, a 1–1 draw with Laiwaden, before five consecutive defeats saw them finish at the bottom of the conference.

They entered the 2019–20 season and started strongly, winning five of their opening nine games thanks to eight goals from Stahl Gubag. However, following Gubag and central defender Nigel Malagian's mid-season transfers to Lae City, the side began to struggle, failing to win in seven games, before a 2–1 victory over playoff rivals Gulf Komara looked like it might stabilise their playoff push. However, a draw and a defeat in their final two games saw them slip to sixth on the final day.

== Domestic record ==
=== National competitions ===
- Papua New Guinea National Soccer League
  - 2019: Northern Conference: 8th
  - 2019–20: 6th

== Players (2020) ==
Note: Flags indicate national team as defined under FIFA eligibility rules; some limited exceptions apply. Players may hold more than one non-FIFA nationality.

| No. | Pos. | Nation | Player |
|---|---|---|---|
| — | GK | PNG | Leehan Manasseh |
| — | GK | PNG | Reynald Dou |
| — | GK | PNG | Jesse Mandari |
| — | DF | PNG | Kimson Kapai |
| — | DF | PNG | Morris Devi |
| — | DF | PNG | Darren Polly |
| — | DF | PNG | Jasper Panu |
| — | DF | PNG | Manasseh Manasseh |
| — | DF | PNG | Richie Apisa |
| — | DF | PNG | Andreas Mapai |
| — | DF | PNG | Blaise Kuar |
| — | MF | PNG | Jonel Kambual |
| — | MF | PNG | Michael Saun |
| — | MF | PNG | Joel Alex |

| No. | Pos. | Nation | Player |
|---|---|---|---|
| — | MF | PNG | Ricky Wadunah |
| — | MF | PNG | Darren Steven |
| — | MF | PNG | Solomon Mapai |
| — | MF | PNG | Jason Wadunah |
| — | MF | PNG | Stahl Gubag |
| — | FW | PNG | Ephraim Leo |
| — | FW | PNG | Nehemiah Geibul |
| — | FW | PNG | Graham Yamre |
| — | FW | PNG | Maskulan Pulung |
| — | FW | PNG | Papalau Awele |

== Club officials (2020) ==
=== Management ===
| Position | Name | Notes |
|---|---|---|
| Chairman | (Papua New Guinea) Conrad Wadunah | |

=== Coaching staff ===
| Position | Name | Notes |
|---|---|---|
| Manager | (Papua New Guinea) Rachel Wadunah | |
| Team manager | (Papua New Guinea) Juanita Kalip - Tawi | |
| Assistant coach | (Papua New Guinea) Nolan Samar | |
| Goalkeeping coach | (Papua New Guinea) David Geladia | |
