= Abel Redenut =

Papua New Guinean football player (born 1995)

Personal information
- Full name: Abel Redenut
- Date of birth: 17 April 1995 (age 31)
- Place of birth: Port Moresby, Papua New Guinea
- Height: 1.74 m (5 ft 9 in)
- Position: Defender

Senior career*
Years	Team	Apps	(Gls)
2011–2014	Besta United PNG		
2014–2016	Port Moresby		
2016–2017	Mungkas		
2018–	Madang		

International career
2011	Papua New Guinea U17	4	(0)
2014	Papua New Guinea U20	3	(0)
2015	Papua New Guinea U23	1	(0)
2017–	Papua New Guinea	4	(0)
Medal record
Men's football
Representing Papua New Guinea
Pacific Games
Bronze medal – third place	2015 Papua New Guinea
MSG Prime Minister's Cup
Winner	2022 Vanuatu
- * Club domestic league appearances and goals

Abel Redenut (born 17 April 1995) is a Papua New Guinean international footballer who plays as a defender for Madang in the Papua New Guinea National Soccer League and the Papua New Guinea national football team.

== Early years ==
Redenut, who is born of mixed Oro and Morobe parentage, started playing soccer at the St. Joseph International School in Port Moresby. Apart from soccer, Redenut has played schoolboys rugby union but upon recollection, decided to focus his energy on football.

== Club career ==
Redenut started his career with Besta United PNG which is the national development team of the Papua New Guinea Football Association. In 2014, just before the 2014 OFC U-20 Championship he joined Port Moresby. In 2016, he joined Mungkas. After two seasons with Mungkas he joined Madang to play for them in the 2018 OFC Champions League.

== International career ==
Redenut progressed through the national teams of PNG, from the U17's up to the national team. In 2015 Redenut was part of the Papua New Guinea national under-23 football team which won a bronze medal at the 2015 Pacific Games. Redenut made his debut for the national team on March 23, 2017, in their 2–1 loss against Tahiti.

== Honours ==
Papua New Guinea

- MSG Prime Minister's Cup: 2022

Papua New Guinea U-23

- Pacific Games: Bronze Medalis, 2015
