= Jonetani Buksh =

Fijian footballer

Personal information
- Full name: Jonetani Nalulu Buksh
- Date of birth: 2 July 1996 (age 30)
- Place of birth: Veisaru, Ba Province, Fiji
- Height: 1.73 m (5 ft 8 in)
- Position: Attacking midfielder

Team information
- Current team: Rewa

Youth career
- Kamil Muslim College
- Ba

Senior career*
Years	Team	Apps	(Gls)
2013–2016	Ba		
2016	Nadroga		
2016–2017	Rewa		
2017	Labasa		
2017–	Rewa		

International career^{‡}
2013	Fiji U17	5	(2)
2014–2015	Fiji U20	2	(0)
2017–	Fiji	1	(0)
Medal record
Men's football
Representing Fiji
OFC U-20 Championship
Winner	2014 Fiji
- * Club domestic league appearances and goals as of 2 September 2017 ‡ National team caps and goals as of 2 September 2017

Jonetani Buksh (born 2 July 1996) is a Fijian footballer who plays as a midfielder for Rewa in the Fiji National Football League.

== Club career ==
Buksh hails from Ba Province. He started playing football at AD Patel College when he was already in secondary school. He was not happy at the school so he decided to move to the famous Kamil Muslim College in Ba, a school that is known for its good football team. This is where he was noticed by the local district team Ba FC and placed in their youth team. After a few years with Ba he moved to Nadroga after failing to get a place in the first team of Ba. He did well at Nadroga and after a few months he moved to Fijian powerhouse Rewa. After a season with them he was signed in January 2017 by Labasa. From the start he was an important member of the team which reached the 3rd place in the 2017 Fiji National Football League. In September 2017 it was announced that Buksh would return to Rewa, also known as the Delta Tigers.

== International career ==
=== U17 ===
Buksh has played for the Fiji U17, Fiji U20 and the Fijian national football team. He played for the Fijian U17 team at the 2013 OFC U-17 Championship. Fiji reached a fourth place (out of six teams) and Buksh scored two goals: In a 2–0 victory over Papua New Guinea and a 5–0 victory against the Cook Islands. He also played in the other three games.

=== U20 ===
In 2014 Buksh was called up for the Fiji national under-20 football team to play at the 2014 OFC U-20 Championship. This tournament was extremely successful for Fiji as they reached the first place. This meant that they had qualified for the 2015 FIFA U-20 World Cup. It was the first time that Fiji had qualified for a FIFA event. Buksh however, played only two games at the qualification tournament, in a 4–0 victory against American Samoa and a 3-0 victory over Papua New Guinea. At the U-20 World Cup was an unused substitute in all three games, including in the first ever victory for Fiji, a 3–0 against Honduras. A year later Buksh was not called up for the Fiji national under-23 football team which played at the 2016 Summer Olympics.

=== Senior team ===
In August 2017 he was called up for the Fijian national football team for two friendly matches in Indonesia. He made his debut on 2 September 2017 in a 0–0 draw against the Indonesia national football team. He played for Rewa against Suva in August 2019 where he scored a goal which was equalised.

== Private life ==
Buksh spent his teens with his grandmother and grandfather after his parents divorced when he was in class 5. Buksh is the second eldest in his family. His younger brother Waisake Soga, born 4 January 2000, is also a football player who is currently part of the youth team of Ba and the Fiji U17 team.

== Honours ==
Fiji U20

- OFC U-20 Championship: 2014
