= Arena Fonte Nova =

Football stadium in Salvador, Bahia, Brazil

Arena Acelen Fonte Nova
- Arena Fonte Nova
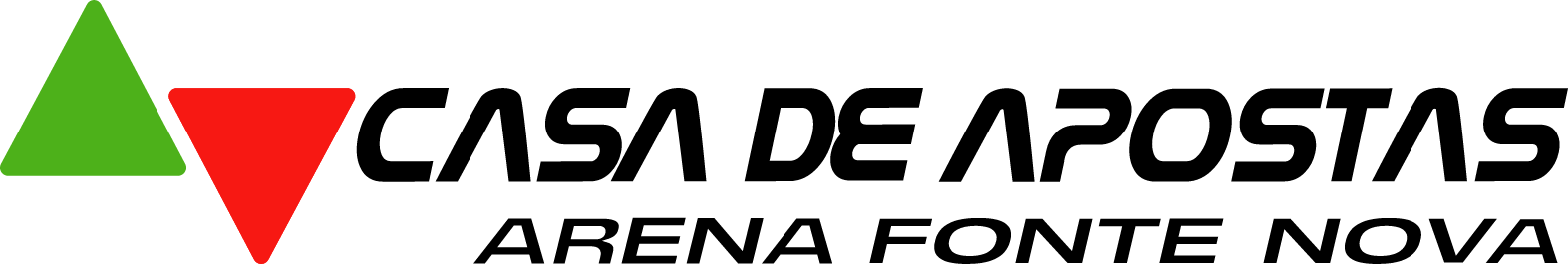

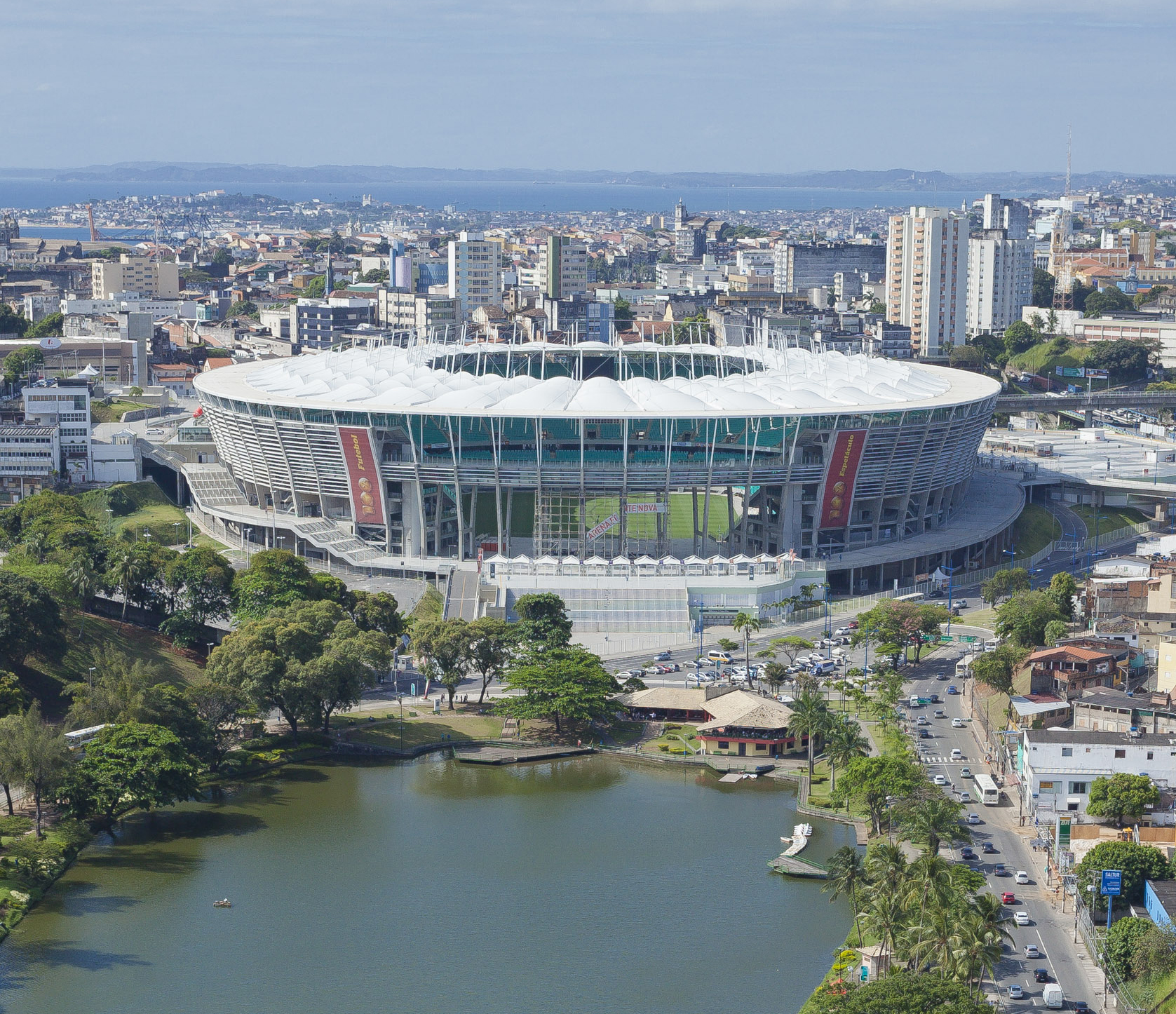
- Sisbrace
- Interactive map of Arena Acelen Fonte Nova
- Former names: Itaipava Arena Fonte Nova (2013–2023); Casa de Apostas Arena Fonte Nova (2024–2026)
- Location: Ladeira da Fonte das Pedras, Nazaré, Salvador, Brazil
- Coordinates: 12°58′43″S 38°30′15″W
- Owner: State of Bahia
- Operator: Fonte Nova Negócios e Participações S/A
- Capacity: 47,902
- Surface: Grass
- Field size: 105 m × 68 m (344 ft × 223 ft)

Construction
- Groundbreaking: 2010
- Opened: April 7, 2013
- Cost: R$ 591 million US$ 267 million
- Architects: Marc Duwe and Claas Schulitz
- Structural engineers: Mathias Kutterer, Yu Hui, Jorge Cheveney

Tenants
- Bahia; Vitória (some matches); Brazil national football team (selected matches)

The Arena Acelen Fonte Nova is a football-specific stadium located in Salvador, Bahia, Brazil with a maximum capacity of 47,902 people. The stadium was built in place of the older Estádio Fonte Nova. Its primary tenant is Esporte Clube Bahia.

The stadium was first used for the 2013 FIFA Confederations Cup and the subsequent 2014 FIFA World Cup, including the 5–1 win of The Netherlands over reigning World Champions Spain.

The stadium was used as one of the venues for the football competition of the 2016 Summer Olympics held in Rio de Janeiro. The stadium was also selected to host matches for the 2019 Copa America. It is included in the list of venues bidding to host matches for the 2027 FIFA Women's World Cup.

== History ==
Following a collapse of a section of the Estádio Fonte Nova, which killed seven people and injured forty more, the governor of Bahia Jaques Wagner announced that the stadium would be demolished and a new stadium would be built in its place.

A group of architects from Brunswick, Germany, which also redesigned the old Hanover stadium into a modern arena for the 2006 FIFA World Cup, was selected after a bidding process. The old stadium was demolished in August 2010, with some of the concrete being reused in the construction of the new stadium. The rest of the concrete was used in projects around Salvador.

In 2013, brewery Itaipava from Grupo Petrópolis bought the naming rights, turning the stadium into "Itaipava Arena Fonte Nova" under a sponsorship agreement until the year 2023, amounting to $100m. This was the first naming rights agreement signed for the 2014 World Cup stadiums. After the contract ended, betting website Casa de Apostas bought the naming rights in 2024. Following the national ban of online betting and its advertising in 2026, energy company Acelen bought the naming rights.

The stadium was inaugurated on April 5, 2013 by President Dilma Rousseff. The first match was played on April 7, 2013, with a Campeonato Baiano game in which Vitória defeated rival Bahia 5–1. The first player to score a goal in the stadium was Vitória's Renato Cajá. During this match, some supporters were unable to see the game completely due to some blind spots. The stadium had excessive dust and some puddles. The company responsible for the stadium, owned by Grupo OAS and Odebrecht, said it was aware of the problems.

On May 27, 2013, a section of the roof collapsed after heavy rain.

== Design ==
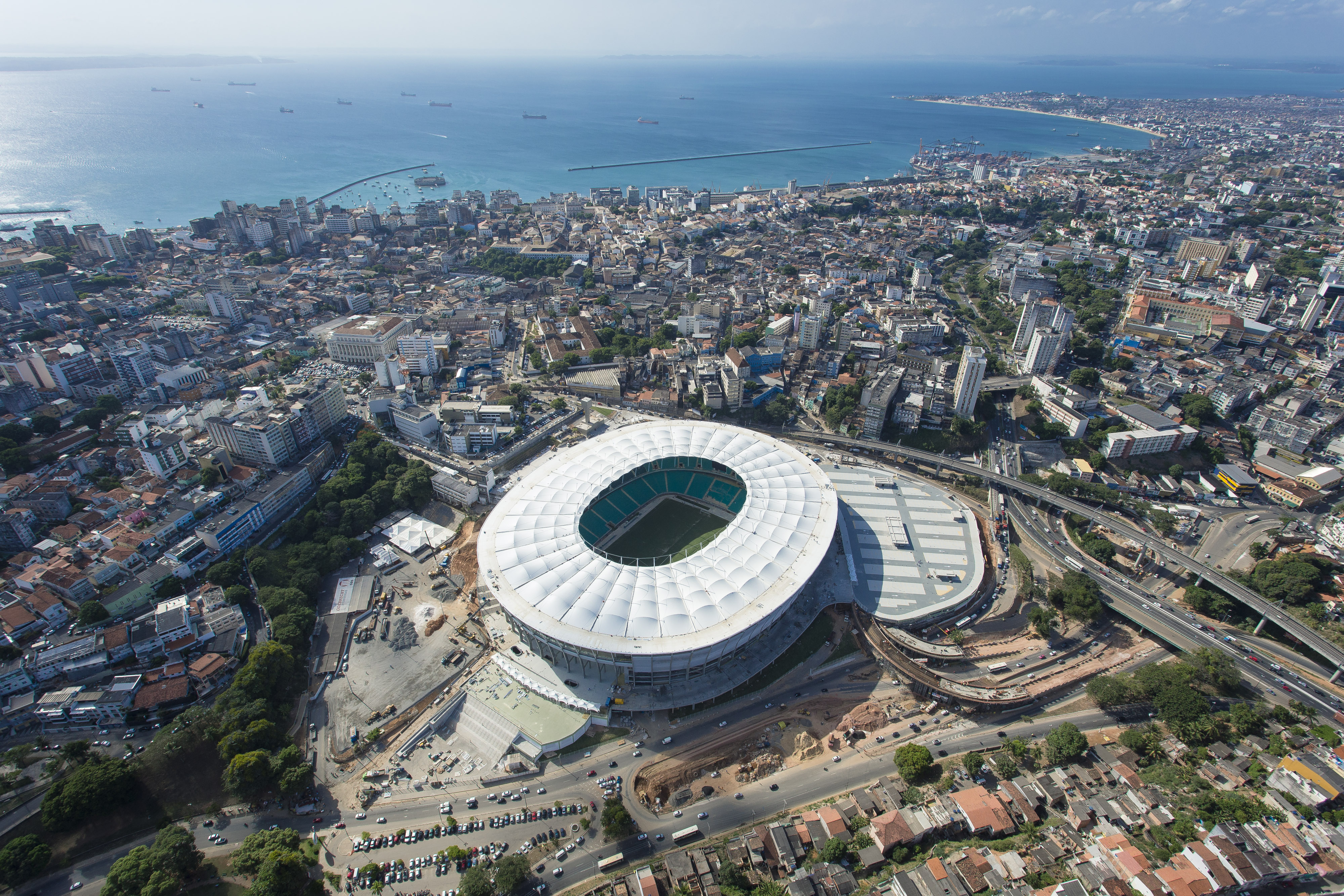
Aerial view, 2013

In addition to football matches, the stadium was designed to be able to host concerts, entertainment, and business events. The multipurpose model was based on the one used in Amsterdam Arena.

Arena Fonte Nova pays homage to the original stadium, preserving the horseshoe design with an opening to the Dique do Tororó.

The new modern roof, which covers all of the seats in the venue, was inspired by the AWD-Arena in Hanover, Germany. The roof consists of a lightweight metal structure based on the ray and ring system, covered with a PTFE membrane and supported by external pillars.

== Public transportation ==
Arena Fonte Nova is accessible from the Campo da Pólvora station of the Salvador Metro.

== Football games ==
=== 2013 FIFA Confederations Cup ===
Date	Time (UTC-03)	Team #1	Result	Team #2	Round	Attendance
June 20, 2013	19:00	Nigeria	1–2	Uruguay	Group B	26,769
June 22, 2013	16:00	Italy	2–4	Brazil	Group A	48,874
June 30, 2013	13:00	Uruguay	2–2 (a.e.t.) (2–3 pen.)	Italy	3rd place	43,382

=== 2014 FIFA World Cup ===
Date	Time (UTC-03)	Team #1	Result	Team #2	Round	Attendance
June 13, 2014	16:00	Spain	1–5	Netherlands	Group B	48,173
June 16, 2014	13:00	Germany	4–0	Portugal	Group G	51,081
June 20, 2014	16:00	Switzerland	2–5	France	Group E	51,003
June 25, 2014	13:00	Bosnia and Herzegovina	3–1	Iran	Group F	48,011
July 1, 2014	17:00	Belgium	2–1 (a.e.t.)	United States	Round of 16	51,227
July 5, 2014	17:00	Netherlands	0–0 (a.e.t.) (4–3 pen.)	Costa Rica	Quarter-finals	51,179

=== 2016 Summer Olympics - Men's Football ===
Date	Time (UTC-03)	Team #1	Result	Team #2	Round	Attendance
August 4, 2016	17:00	Mexico	2–2	Germany	Group C	16,500
August 4, 2016	20:00	Fiji	0–8	South Korea	Group C	16,000
August 7, 2016	13:00	Fiji	1–5	Mexico	Group C	11,200
August 7, 2016	16:00	Germany	3–3	South Korea	Group C	17,121
August 10, 2016	19:00	Japan	1–0	Sweden	Group B	17,821
August 10, 2016	22:00	Denmark	0–4	Brazil	Group A	41,067
August 13, 2016	16:00	Nigeria	2–0	Denmark	Quarter-finals	30,307

=== 2016 Summer Olympics - Women's Football ===
Date	Time (UTC-03)	Team #1	Res.	Team #2	Round	Attendance
August 9, 2016	16:00	Australia	6–1	Zimbabwe	Group F	5,115
August 9, 2016	19:00	New Zealand	0–3	France	Group G	7,350
August 12, 2016	16:00	China	0–1	Germany	Quarter-finals	9,642

=== 2019 Copa América ===
Date	Time (UTC-03)	Team #1	Result	Team #2	Round	Attendance
June 15, 2019	19:00	Argentina	0–2	Colombia	Group B	35,572
June 18, 2019	21:30	Brazil	0–0	Venezuela	Group A	42,587
June 21, 2019	20:00	Ecuador	1–2	Chile	Group C	14,727
June 23, 2019	16:00	Colombia	1–0	Paraguay	Group B	13,903
June 29, 2019	16:00	Uruguay	0–0 (4–5 pen.)	Peru	Quarter-finals	21,180

=== 2027 FIFA Women's World Cup ===
Date	Time (UTC-03)	Team #1	Result	Team #2	Round	Attendance
25 June 2027	--:--	A3	v	A4	Group A	
27 June 2027	--:--	F1	v	F2	Group F	
29 June 2027	--:--	H3	v	H4	Group H	
2 July 2027	--:--	E4	v	E2	Group E	
4 July 2027	--:--	A3	v	A2	Group A	
7 July 2027	--:--	F3	v	F2	Group F	
12 July 2027	--:--	Winner Group G	v	Runner-up Group H	Round of 16	

=== Brazil national football team ===
Date	Time (UTC-03)	Team #1	Result	Team #2	Round	Attendance
November 17, 2015	21:00	Brazil	3–0	Peru	2018 FIFA World Cup qualification	45,000
November 19, 2024	21:45	Brazil	1–1	Uruguay	2026 FIFA World Cup qualification	41,511

== Concerts ==
Date	Artist	Tour	Attendance	Box office
14 December 2013	Ivete Sangalo	IS20	40,000	
8 January 2014	David Guetta	Listen Tour	20,000	
22 February 2014	Elton John	The Diving Board Tour	34,503	$2,305,150
29 November 2014	Roberto Carlos	Turnê 2014	40,000	
10 December 2016	Nando Reis; BaianaSystem; Natiruts; O Rappa; Capital Inicial; Planet Hemp	Festival de Verão de Salvador 2016		
10 December 2016	Ivete Sangalo	Festival de Verão de Salvador 2016		
27 August 2017	Hanson	Middle of Everywhere: 25th Anniversary Tour		
11 October 2017	Xuxa	XuChá		
20 October 2017	Paul McCartney	One on One	49,868	$4,923,040
16 December 2017	Ivete Sangalo; O Rappa; Simone & Simaria; Vintage Culture; Luan Santana	Festival de Verão de Salvador 2017		
17 December 2017	Anitta; Aviões; Alok; Wesley Safadão; Marília Mendonça; Harmonia do Samba	Festival de Verão de Salvador 2017		
28 July 2018	Tribalistas		18,000	
17 October 2018	Roger Waters	Us + Them Tour	28,477	$1,410,590
13 July 2019	Sandy & Junior	Nossa História	30,000	
1 February 2020	Ivete Sangalo; IZA; Marcelo Falcão; Baco Exu do Blues	Festival de Verão de Salvador 2020		
2 February 2020	Vitão; Melim; Bell Marques	Festival de Verão de Salvador 2020		
15 July 2022	a-ha	Play Hunting High and Low Live		
11 March 2023	Skank	Turnê da Despedida		
21 December 2023	Roberto Carlos	Turnê 2023		

== See also ==
- List of association football stadiums by capacity
- List of football stadiums in Brazil
- Lists of stadiums
