= Shaneel Naidu =

Fijian footballer

Personal information
- Date of birth: 28 March 1995 (age 31)
- Place of birth: Fiji
- Height: 1.83 m (6 ft 0 in)
- Position: Goalkeeper
Medal record
Men's football
Representing Fiji
OFC U-20 Championship
Winner	2014 Fiji

Shaneel Naidu (born 28 March 1995) is a Fijian footballer. He represented Fiji in the football competition at the 2016 Summer Olympics.

== Honours ==
Fiji U20

- OFC U-20 Championship: 2014
