= John Kapi Natto =

Papua New Guinean football administrator and businessman

President of the Papua New Guinea Football Association
- Incumbent
- Assumed office 27 October 2018
- Preceded by: David Chung

Personal details
- Spouse: Vonnie Kapi Natto
- Occupation: Businessman, sports administrator
- Known for: Owner and chairman of PNG Hekari FC

John Kapi Natto is a Papua New Guinean businessman and sports administrator, the owner and chairman of PNG Hekari FC (formerly Hekari United), the most successful club in the Papua New Guinea Premier Soccer League. He has served as President of the Papua New Guinea Football Association (PNGFA) since October 2018.

== Early life and business career ==
Natto is a businessman based in Southern Highlands Province, where he has served as chairman of the Nama'Aporo Landowners Association in Kutubu. In April 2013, he was charged by police over allegations of misappropriating landowners' infrastructure development grant funds while serving in that role, alongside the association's treasurer, Peter Heno; both were released on bail of K10,000 each. Natto stated that he held legal authority as chairman of the association to use the funds for projects in the Southern Highlands.

== Hekari United and PNG Hekari FC ==
Natto founded a football club that entered the Port Moresby football pyramid under the name PRK Souths United, which became a founding member of Papua New Guinea's semi-professional National Soccer League at its launch in 2006. Under Natto's ownership, the club — later renamed Hekari United — recruited players from across the Pacific, including Fiji and the Solomon Islands, and won each of the league's first eight titles. CNN described Natto as having become "the Roman Abramovich of Papua New Guinean football". By at least 2008, Natto also held the positions of PNGFA Vice President and chairman of the National Soccer League board.

In 2010, Hekari United won the 2010 OFC Champions League, becoming the first club from outside Australia and New Zealand to win the OFC's premier club competition. The title earned the club a place at the 2010 FIFA Club World Cup in Abu Dhabi, making it the first Papua New Guinean club to compete at the tournament.

== Breakaway federation and PNGFA presidency ==
=== Football Federation Papua New Guinea (2016–2018) ===
In the lead-up to the PNGFA's delayed December 2016 presidential election, in which Natto was a candidate, he was suspended from the PNGFA on 30 November 2016 for alleged non-compliance with FIFA's electoral code, clearing the way for incumbent David Chung to be re-elected unopposed. The following day, Natto announced that Hekari United and 11 other PNGFA-affiliated associations would withdraw from the PNGFA's competitions, saying he felt compelled to act for associations he believed had been neglected at the grassroots level.

On 2 February 2017, the Oceania Football Confederation disqualified Hekari United from the 2017 OFC Champions League following a complaint from the PNGFA. Natto criticised the decision as unfair, describing Chung's re-election as undemocratic and characterising himself and other critics of the PNGFA leadership as marginalised. Later that month, on 27 February 2017, Natto launched a rival governing body, the Football Federation Papua New Guinea (FFPNG), and its own competition, the National Premier League.

Following talks between the two bodies and pressure from FIFA, the FFPNG agreed to dissolve, and the PNGFA and FFPNG formally reunited on 27 October 2018.

=== President of the PNGFA (2018–present) ===
At the reunification congress, Natto was elected President of the PNGFA, defeating acting president John Wesley Gonjuan by ten votes to eight. In his election speech, Natto said he intended to see Papua New Guinea qualify for the 2026 FIFA World Cup. He was re-elected unopposed in June 2020.

During Natto's presidency, the PNGFA has expanded its membership from 18 to 23 associations and introduced Futsal and beach soccer competitions to its programme, with Papua New Guinea competing in the OFC Beach Championship for the first time. In 2022, the National Soccer League was rebranded as the Papua New Guinea Premier Soccer League under his presidency. As of the 2026 season, Natto remained PNGFA president, describing the competition as marking 21 years since its 2006 founding.

Natto has also spoken publicly on player welfare issues, including expressing condolences on behalf of the PNGFA following the death of Laiwaden FC goalkeeper Mikes Gewa in 2019, after an on-field incident during a National Soccer League match.

== Personal life ==
Natto is married to Vonnie Kapi Natto, who has served as Hekari United's team manager and as head of the National Capital District Provincial Soccer/Sports Association.
