= Lee Seul-chan =

South Korean footballer (born 1993)

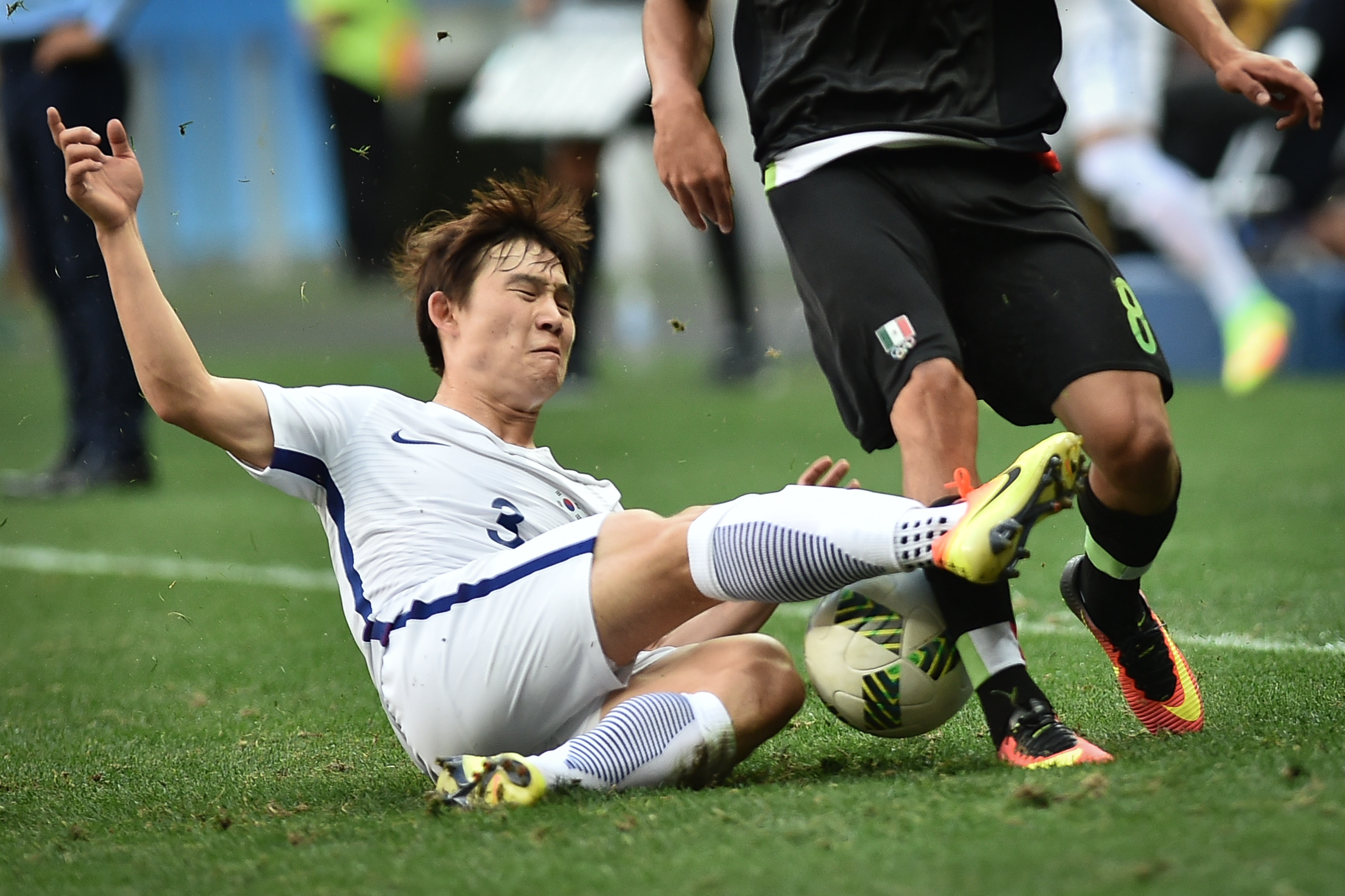
- Rio 2016

Personal information
- Date of birth: 15 August 1993 (age 33)
- Place of birth: South Korea
- Height: 1.72 m (5 ft 7 1/2 in)
- Position: Full back

Team information
- Current team: Gimhae FC
- Number: 3

Youth career
- 2006–2008: Jeonnam Dragons U-15; Gwangyang Jecheol Middle School
- 2009–2011: Jeonnam Dragons U-18; Gwangyang Jecheol High School

Senior career*
Years	Team	Apps	(Gls)
2012–2019	Jeonnam Dragons	125	(4)
2020–2021	Daejeon Hana Citizen	17	(0)
2021	→ Gimpo FC (loan)	15	(0)
2022	Goyang KH FC	20	(2)
2023	Geoje Citizen FC	20	(1)
2023–2024	Gyeongju Korea Hydro & Nuclear Power FC	34	(0)
2025–	Gimhae FC	30	(2)

International career
2015–2016	South Korea U-23	17	(0)
- * Club domestic league appearances and goals as of 10 August 2026

- Lee Seul-chan
- Hangul: 이슬찬
- Hanja: 李瑟燦
- RR: I Seulchan
- MR: I Sŭlch'an

Lee Seul-chan (Korean: 이슬찬; born 15 August 1993) is a South Korean footballer who plays as full back or defensive midfielder for Gimhae FC.

== Career ==
=== Club career ===
He joined Jeonnam Dragons in 2012.

In 2022, he left Daejeon Hana Citizen and joined K4 League side Goyang KH FC, which was founded in December 10, 2021.

== Career statistics ==
As of match played on 11 March 2018

Appearances and goals by club, season and competition
Club	Season	League			Cup		League Cup		Other		Total	
Club	Season	Division	Apps	Goals	Apps	Goals	Apps	Goals	Apps	Goals	Apps	Goals
Jeonnam Dragons	2012	K-League	4	0	0	0	0	0	0	0	4	0
Jeonnam Dragons	2013	K League Classic	3	0	0	0	0	0	0	0	3	0
Jeonnam Dragons	2014	K League Classic	1	0	0	0	0	0	0	0	1	0
Jeonnam Dragons	2015	K League Classic	22	0	3	0	0	0	0	0	25	0
Jeonnam Dragons	2016	K League Classic	14	0	2	0	0	0	0	0	16	0
Jeonnam Dragons	2017	K League Classic	33	4	2	0	0	0	0	0	35	4
Jeonnam Dragons	2018	K League 1	28	0	0	0	0	0	0	0	28	0
Career totals			142	4	7	0	0	0	0	0	149	4
