= Anish Khem =

Fijian footballer

Anish Khem (born 27 August 1993) is a Fijian footballer who plays as a midfielder for Suva F.C. He represented Fiji in the football competition at the 2016 Summer Olympics.

== Club career ==
Khem was born in Labasa, Fiji. He left Rewa F.C. for Suva F.C. in January 2022.

== International career ==
Khem made his debut for the Fiji national team on 26 June 2016 in a friendly game against Malaysia. In this game, which ended in a 1–1 draw. He played the first 45 minutes before being replaced by Kolinio Sivoki.

== Personal life ==
His brother, Ashnil Raju, is also a footballer.
