= Obert Bika =

Papua New Guinean footballer

Personal information
- Full name: Obert Alisap Bika
- Date of birth: 11 May 1993 (age 33)
- Place of birth: Papua New Guinea
- Position: Midfielder

Team information
- Current team: Lae City FC
- Number: 10

Senior career*
Years	Team	Apps	(Gls)
2012–2014	Besta United PNG		
2014–	Lae City FC		

International career
2016–	Papua New Guinea		
Medal record
Men's football
Representing Papua New Guinea
OFC Nations Cup
Runner-up	2016 Papua New Guinea
- * Club domestic league appearances and goals

Obert Bika (born 11 May 1993) is a Papua New Guinean footballer who plays as a midfielder for Lae City FC. He made his debut for the national team on June 17, 2016.

== Honours ==
Papua New Guinea

- OFC Nations Cup: runner-up, 2016
