= 2014 OFC U-20 Championship =

Tournament details
- Host country: Fiji
- City: Suva
- Dates: 23–31 May 2014
- Teams: 6 (from 1 confederation)
- Venue: 1 (in 1 host city)

Final positions
- Champions: Fiji (1st title)
- Runners-up: Vanuatu
- Third place: New Caledonia
- Fourth place: Solomon Islands

Tournament statistics
- Matches played: 15
- Goals scored: 55 (3.67 per match)
- Top scorer(s): (Solomon Islands) Atkin Kaua (5 goals)
- Best player: (Vanuatu) Jacky Ruben
- Best goalkeeper: (Fiji) Misiwani Nairube
- Fair play award: Solomon Islands

The 2014 OFC U-20 Championship was the 20th edition of the biennial international youth football tournament organized by the Oceania Football Confederation (OFC) for players aged 19 and below (despite the name remaining as U-20 Championship). The tournament was held in Fiji from 23 to 31 May 2014.

Despite the name remaining as U-20 Championship, the age limit was reduced by a year to 19 years of age. So players who want to participate in the tournament needed to be born on or after 1 January 1995. At an OFC Executive Committee meeting held at its Auckland headquarters in November 2013 the competition format was modified. The competition was brought forward a year and the age limit was lowered to 19 years of age. The changes were made in order to allow the winner of the competition plenty of time for preparation and player development for up-and-coming World Cups at Under 20 level.

Hosts Fiji won the tournament and qualified for the 2015 FIFA U-20 World Cup in New Zealand. New Zealand, who were the title holders but did not play, automatically qualified for the 2015 FIFA U-20 World Cup as hosts, so two teams represented the OFC in the 2015 FIFA U-20 World Cup.

== Participating teams ==
Six teams participated in the tournament.

Participants

- American Samoa
- New Caledonia
- Fiji (hosts)
- Papua New Guinea
- Solomon Islands
- Vanuatu

Did not participate

- Cook Islands
- New Zealand (already qualified for 2015 as host)
- Samoa
- Tahiti
- Tonga

== Officials ==
Seven referees and eight assistant referees were named for the tournament.

Referees

- (Vanuatu) Robinson Banga
- (Vanuatu) Bruce George
- (Fiji) Ravinesh Behairi
- (French Polynesia) Averii Jacques
- (Papua New Guinea) Albert Maru
- (Solomon Islands) Nelson Sogo
- (Solomon Islands) George Time

Assistant Referees

- (Papua New Guinea) Roger Adams
- (French Polynesia) Paul Ahupu
- (Vanuatu) Jeremy Garae
- (Tonga) Folio Moeaki
- (Tonga) Sione Teu
- (Fiji) Avinesh Narayan
- (Solomon Islands) Johnny Erick Niabo
- (Cook Islands) Terry Piri

== Venues ==
Suva
National Stadium (ANZ Stadium)
Capacity:30,000

The host city is Suva.

== Group stage ==
The group stage fixtures were announced on 7 May 2014, with the games scheduled as a round-robin tournament.

Team	Pld	W	D	L	GF	GA	GD	Pts
Fiji	5	4	1	0	13	3	+10	13
Vanuatu	5	3	2	0	11	4	+7	11
New Caledonia	5	3	0	2	17	5	+12	9
Solomon Islands	5	1	1	3	7	7	0	4
Papua New Guinea	5	1	1	3	6	13	−7	4
American Samoa	5	0	1	4	1	23	−22	1

23 May 2014
14:30 UTC+12

American Samoa	0–4	Fiji
	Report	Waqa 15'; Dreloa 24'; Tuivuna 30'; Nabenia 45+3'

ANZ Stadium, Suva
Referee: Albert Maru (Papua New Guinea)
23 May 2014
17:00 UTC+12

Vanuatu	1–0	New Caledonia
Koka 66'	Report

ANZ Stadium, Suva
Referee: Nelson Sogo (Solomon Islands)
23 May 2014
19:30 UTC+12

Solomon Islands	0–2	Papua New Guinea
	Report	Yagas 10'; Bob 51'

ANZ Stadium, Suva
Referee: Ravinesh Behari (Fiji)

25 May 2014
14:30 UTC+12

Solomon Islands	0–0	Vanuatu
	Report

ANZ Stadium, Suva
Referee: Averii Jacques (Tahiti)
25 May 2014
17:00 UTC+12

Papua New Guinea	1–1	American Samoa
Simongi 58'	Report	Tua 45+3'

ANZ Stadium, Suva
Referee: George Time (Solomon Islands)
25 May 2014
19:30 UTC+12

Fiji	2–0	New Caledonia
Nabenia 47'; Tuivuna 65' (pen.)	Report

ANZ Stadium, Suva
Referee: Robinson Banga (Vanuatu)

27 May 2014
14:30 UTC+12

Fiji	3–0	Papua New Guinea
Sahib 43'; Toma 55'; Waqa 76'	Report

ANZ Stadium, Suva
Referee: Bruce George (Vanuatu)
27 May 2014
17:00 UTC+12

New Caledonia	3–1	Solomon Islands
Oiremon 12'; Athale 81'; Nyikeine 89'	Report	Kaua 66'

ANZ Stadium, Suva
Referee: Albert Maru (Papua New Guinea)
27 May 2014
19:30 UTC+12

American Samoa	0–4	Vanuatu
	Report	Kalo 15'; Saniel 41'; Kalsong 56', 67'

ANZ Stadium, Suva
Referee: Ravinesh Behairi (Fiji)

29 May 2014
14:30 UTC+12

Solomon Islands	5–0	American Samoa
Bakale 22'; Kaua 35', 47', 77'; Rangosulia 90+1'	Report

ANZ Stadium, Suva
Referee: Bruce George (Vanuatu)
29 May 2014
17:00 UTC+12

Vanuatu	2–2	Fiji
Kalo 22'; Iawak 57'	Report	Chand 25'; Dreloa 40'

ANZ Stadium, Suva
Referee: Averii Jacques (Tahiti)
29 May 2014
19:30 UTC+12

Papua New Guinea	1–5	New Caledonia
Awele 82'	Report	Waru 7', 70'; Athale 41'; Nemia 53'; Nyikeine 77'

ANZ Stadium, Suva
Referee: Robinson Banga (Vanuatu)

31 May 2014
14:30 UTC+12

New Caledonia	9–0	American Samoa
Wathiepel 9'; Jalabert 23'; Athale 35'; Nykeine 38', 50'; Oiremoin 68', 74', 85'; Ouka 77'	Report

ANZ Stadium, Suva
Referee: Nelson Sogo (Solomon Islands)
31 May 2014
17:00 UTC+12

Papua New Guinea	2–4	Vanuatu
Donna 15' (o.g.); Awele 62'	Report	Kalsong 42', 63'; Kaltak 89', 90+3'

ANZ Stadium, Suva
Referee: George Time Solomon Islands)
31 May 2014
19:30 UTC+12

Fiji	2–1	Solomon Islands
Chand 25'; Naidu 26'	Report	Kaua 9'

ANZ Stadium, Suva
Referee: Albert Maru (Papua New Guinea)

== Awards ==
The Golden Ball Award is awarded to the most outstanding player of the tournament. The Golden Glove Award is awarded to the best goalkeeper of the tournament. The Golden Boot Award is awarded to the top scorer of the tournament. The Fair Play Award is awarded to the team with the best disciplinary record at the tournament.

Award	Recipient
Golden Ball	(Vanuatu) Jacky Ruben
Golden Glove	(Fiji) Misiwani Nairube
Golden Boot	(Solomon Islands) Atkin Kaua (5 goals)
Fair Play Award	Solomon Islands

== Goalscorers ==
5 goals

- (Solomon Islands) Atkin Kaua

4 goals

- (New Caledonia) Valentin Nyikeine
- (New Caledonia) Raphael Oiremon
- (Vanuatu) Kersom Kalsong

3 goals

- (New Caledonia) Joseph Athale

2 goals

- (Fiji) Nickel Chand
- (Fiji) Jale Dreloa
- (Fiji) Samuela Nabenia
- (Fiji) Antonio Tuivuna
- (Fiji) Saula Waqa
- (New Caledonia) Marion Waru
- (Papua New Guinea) Papalau Awele
- (Vanuatu) Bong Kalo
- (Vanuatu) Tony Kaltak

1 goals

- (American Samoa) Sinisa Tua
- (Fiji) Praneel Naidu
- (Fiji) Al-taaf Sahib
- (Fiji) Mataiasi Toma
- (New Caledonia) Theo Jalabert
- (New Caledonia) Frederic Nemia
- (New Caledonia) Jim Ouka
- (New Caledonia) Josue Wathiepel
- (Papua New Guinea) Maya Bob
- (Papua New Guinea) Frederick Simongi
- (Papua New Guinea) Ayrton Yagas
- (Solomon Islands) Timothy Bakale
- (Solomon Islands) Jared Rangosulia
- (Vanuatu) Kerry Iawak
- (Vanuatu) Justin Koka
- (Vanuatu) Alex Saniel

Own goal

- (Vanuatu) Goshen Dona (scored for Papua New Guinea)
