= Samuela Nabenia =

Fijian footballer

Personal information
- Date of birth: 9 February 1995 (age 31)
- Place of birth: Fiji
- Height: 1.78 m (5 ft 10 in)
- Position: Striker

Team information
- Current team: Lautoka F.C.
- Number: 10

Senior career*
Years	Team	Apps	(Gls)
2014–2018	Ba F.C.		(7)
2018–	Lautoka F.C.		

International career^{‡}
2016–	Fiji	4	(0)
Medal record
Men's football
Representing Fiji
OFC U-20 Championship
Winner	2014 Fiji
- * Club domestic league appearances and goals as of 8 July 2016 ‡ National team caps and goals as of 19 November 2017

Samuela Nabenia (born 9 February 1995) is a Fijian footballer who plays as a striker for Lautoka F.C. in the Fijian National Football League.

== Honours ==
Fiji U20

- OFC U-20 Championship: 2014
