= Saula Waqa =

Fijian footballer (born 1995)

Personal information
- Full name: Saula Matayalo Waqa
- Date of birth: 12 October 1995 (age 31)
- Place of birth: Nalawa, Ra, Fiji
- Height: 1.97 m (6 ft 6 in)
- Position: Forward

Team information
- Current team: Ba
- Number: 15

Youth career
- Ba

Senior career*
Years	Team	Apps	(Gls)
2013–2022	Ba	53	(30)
2022–	Lautoka	5	(4)

International career^{‡}
2014–15	Fiji U-20	8	(2)
2015–2016	Fiji U-23	2	(0)
2017–	Fiji	12	(8)
Medal record
Men's football
Representing Fiji
OFC U-20 Championship
Winner	2014 Fiji
Pacific Mini Games
Silver medal – second place	2017 Vanuatu
- * Club domestic league appearances and goals as of 10 September 2016 ‡ National team caps and goals as of 15 December 2017

Saula Waqa (born 12 October 1995) is a Fijian footballer who plays for Ba FC in the Fiji National Football League. He represented Fiji in the football competition at the 2016 Summer Olympics. Waqa has represented Nailaga Football Club and Flying Arrows Football Club in the local district club competitions. Being picked into the Ba squad at a very young age, Waqa has been instrumental in many big matches for the Fiji football giants scoring crucial goals. He was rewarded by Ba FC with the captain's arm bend at the age of 24 in 2020 after many senior players retired or left the club to join other teams.

== Controversies ==
IDC Suspension

Fiji FA disciplinary committee suspended Waqa from taking part in the 2017 Inter District Championship pool round after he had failed to show up for an earlier national team training camp. He was suspended along with Nadi's striker, Rusiate Matarerega.

Positive drug use

Saula Waqa was the captain of the Ba Football team for the 2020 Battle of the Giants Tournament where he tested positive for banned substance after the first round of matches. He was subsequently suspended from all levels of football for 3 years by the Fiji Football Association. Fiji Football Association's CEO, Mohammed Yusuf said Waqa was a repeat offender. Waqa and the Ba Football Association were also fined $500 each. Saula Waqa scored twice as Ba beat Nasinu 7–3 in their opening match of the tournament.

== Career statistics ==
=== International ===
Appearances and goals by national team and year
National team	Year	Apps	Goals
Fiji	2017	9	8
Fiji	2018	1	0
Fiji	2022	2	0
Total		12	8

Scores and results list Fiji's goal tally first, score column indicates score after each Waqa goal.

List of international goals scored by Saula Waqa
No.	Date	Venue	Opponent	Score	Result	Competition	Ref.
1	7 June 2017	Churchill Park, Lautoka, Fiji	New Caledonia	1–2	2–2	2018 FIFA World Cup qualification	
2	2 December 2017	Port Vila Municipal Stadium, Port Vila, Vanuatu	Tuvalu	3–0	8–0	2017 Pacific Mini Games	
3	2 December 2017	Port Vila Municipal Stadium, Port Vila, Vanuatu	Tuvalu	5–0	8–0	2017 Pacific Mini Games	
4	2 December 2017	Port Vila Municipal Stadium, Port Vila, Vanuatu	Tuvalu	6–0	8–0	2017 Pacific Mini Games	
5	12 December 2017	Port Vila Municipal Stadium, Port Vila, Vanuatu	Tonga	1–0	4–0	2017 Pacific Mini Games	
6	12 December 2017	Port Vila Municipal Stadium, Port Vila, Vanuatu	Tonga	4–0	4–0	2017 Pacific Mini Games	
7	15 December 2017	Port Vila Municipal Stadium, Port Vila, Vanuatu	New Caledonia	1–0	4–1	2017 Pacific Mini Games	
8	15 December 2017	Port Vila Municipal Stadium, Port Vila, Vanuatu	New Caledonia	2–0	4–1	2017 Pacific Mini Games	

== Honours ==
=== Player ===
Fiji

- Pacific Mini Games: Silver Medalist, 2017

Fiji U20

- OFC U-20 Championship: 2014

=== Individual ===
- 2014–15 OFC Champions League Golden Boot (5 goals)
- 2017 Fiji National Football League Golden Boot (10 goals)
- 2017 Pacific Mini Games Golden Boot (7 goals)
