= Papalau Awele =

Papua New Guinean footballer

Personal information
- Full name: Papalau Awele
- Date of birth: 1 March 1995 (age 31)
- Place of birth: Port Moresby, Papua New Guinea
- Position: Midfielder

Team information
- Current team: Tusbab Stallions

Senior career*
| Years | Team | Apps | (Gls) |
| 2012–2017 | Hekari United | | |
| 2017–2018 | Madang | | |
| 2018–2019 | Kagua-Erave | | |
| 2019– | Tusbab Stallions | | |

International career^{‡}
| 2011–2014 | Papua New Guinea U-20 | 11 | (2) |
| 2015– | Papua New Guinea U-23 | 6 | (0) |
| 2016– | Papua New Guinea | 1 | (0) |
Medal record
Men's football
Representing Papua New Guinea
Pacific Games
| Bronze medal – third place | 2015 Papua New Guinea |
- * Club domestic league appearances and goals as of 26 March 2016 ‡ National team caps and goals as of 26 March 2016

Papalau Awele (born 1 March 1995) is a Papua New Guinean footballer who plays as a midfielder for Tusbab Stallions. He made his debut for the national team on March 24, 2016 in their 2–0 loss against the Solomon Islands.

== Career ==
He has played club football with Papua New Guinea top club Hekari United, Madang and Kagua-Erave. At the end of 2019 he moved to Tusbab Stallions, to play for them in the 2019 Papua New Guinea National Soccer League.

== Honours ==
Papua New Guinea U-23

- Pacific Games: Bronze Medalis, 2015
