= Praneel Naidu =

Fijian footballer

Praneel Naidu (born 29 January 1995) is a Fijian footballer who plays for Ba. He represented Fiji in the football competition at the 2016 Summer Olympics.

== Honours ==
Fiji U20

- OFC U-20 Championship: 2014; Runner-up, 2013
