= Timothy Bakale =

Solomon Islands footballer

Personal information
- Full name: Timothy Bakale
- Date of birth: 29 March 1995 (age 31)
- Place of birth: Solomon Islands
- Position: Midfielder

Team information
- Current team: Henderson Eels F.C.

Senior career*
Years	Team	Apps	(Gls)
2012–2014	Western United		
2014–2016	Malaita Kingz		
2016–2018	Marist		
2018–2020	Western United		

International career
2014	Solomon Islands U20	5	(1)
2015	Solomon Islands U23	3	(0)
2016–	Solomon Islands		
- * Club domestic league appearances and goals

Timothy Bakale (born 29 March 1995) is a Solomon Islands international footballer who plays as a midfielder. He was named to the national squad making his debut for the national team on October 8, 2016, in their 1–0 loss against New Caledonia.
