= Football at the 2016 Summer Olympics – Men's tournament – Group A =

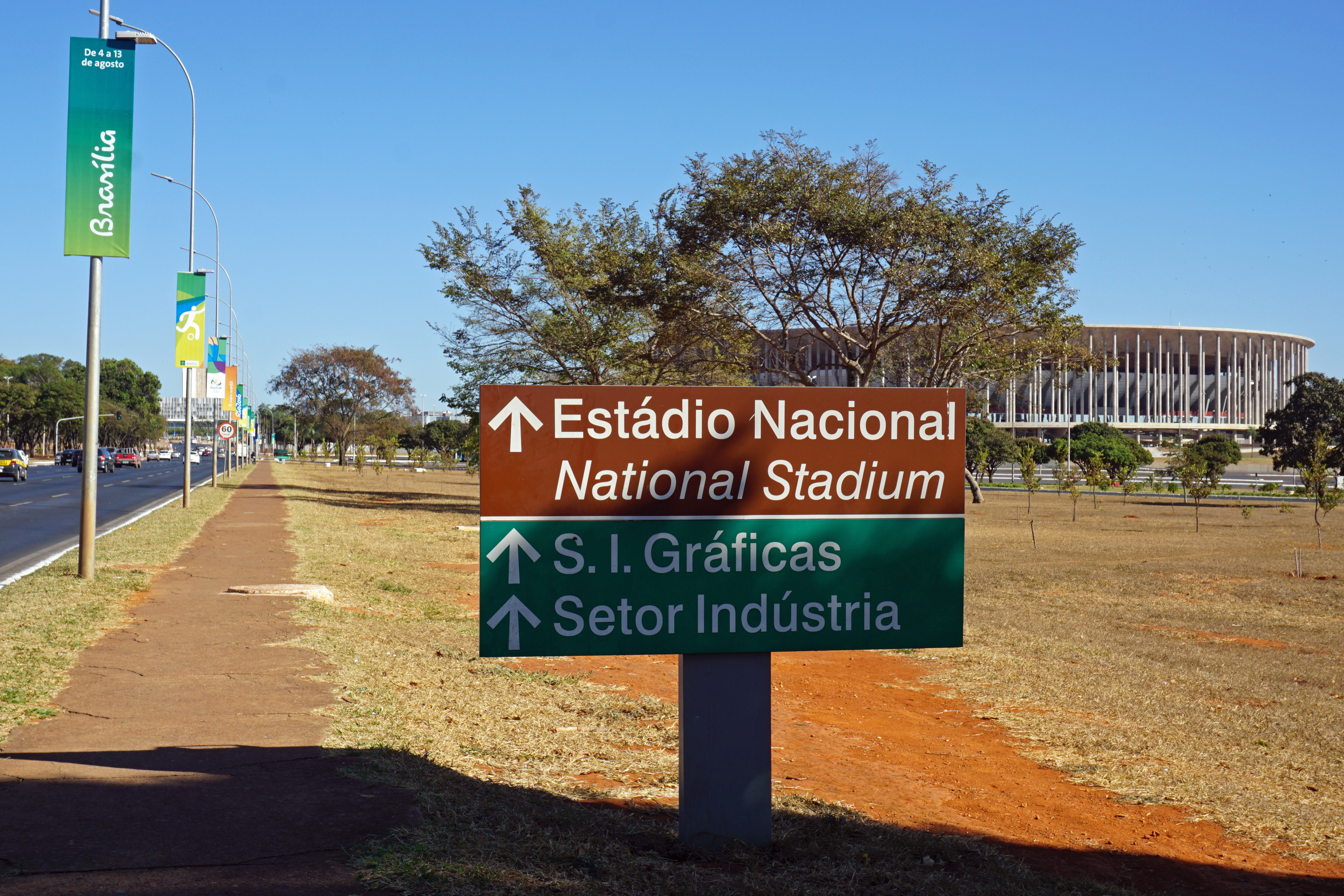
The first matches of Group A were played at Estádio Nacional Mané Garrincha, Brasília.

Group A of the men's football tournament at the 2016 Summer Olympics was played from 4 to 10 August 2016, and included hosts Brazil, Denmark, Iraq and South Africa. The top two teams advanced to the knockout stage.

All times are BRT (UTC−3).

== Teams ==
Draw position	Team	Confederation	Method of qualification	Date of qualification	Olympic appearance	Last appearance	Previous best performance
A1	Brazil	CONMEBOL	Hosts	2 October 2009	13th	2012	Silver medal (1984, 1988, 2012)
A2	South Africa	CAF	Africa U-23 Cup of Nations 3rd place	12 December 2015	2nd	2000	Group stage (2000)
A3	Iraq	AFC	AFC U-23 Championship 3rd place	29 January 2016	5th	2004	Fourth place (2004)
A4	Denmark	UEFA	UEFA Under-21 Championship semi-finalists	23 June 2015	9th	1992	Silver medal (1908, 1912, 1960)

== Standings ==
Pos	Team	Pld	W	D	L	GF	GA	GD	Pts	Qualification
1	Brazil (H)	3	1	2	0	4	0	+4	5	Quarter-finals
2	Denmark	3	1	1	1	1	4	−3	4	Quarter-finals
3	Iraq	3	0	3	0	1	1	0	3	
4	South Africa	3	0	2	1	1	2	−1	2	

Source: Rio2016 & FIFA
Rules for classification: Tiebreakers
(H) Hosts

== Matches ==
=== Iraq vs Denmark ===
4 August 2016
13:00

Iraq	0–0	Denmark
	Report (Rio2016); Report (FIFA)

Estádio Nacional Mané Garrincha, Brasília
Attendance: 18,000
Referee: César Ramos (Mexico)

Iraq	Denmark

GK	12	Mohammed Hameed
DF	2	Ahmad Ibrahim	(yellow card) 54'
DF	4	Mustafa Nadhim
DF	6	Ali Adnan
DF	13	Sherko Karim
MF	11	Humam Tariq
MF	15	Dhurgham Ismail
MF	16	Saad Abdul-Amir (c)
MF	18	Amjad Attwan
FW	7	Hammadi Ahmad		(substituted off) 65'
FW	10	Ali Hosni		(substituted off) 66'
Substitutions:
FW	8	Mohannad Abdul-Raheem		(substituted on) 65'
MF	9	Mahdi Kamel		(substituted on) 66'
Manager:
Abdul Ghani Shahad

GK	1	Jeppe Højbjerg
DF	2	Mikkel Desler
DF	4	Edigeison Gomes
DF	5	Jakob Blåbjerg
DF	15	Pascal Gregor
MF	6	Andreas Maxsø
MF	14	Casper Nielsen		(substituted off) 60'
MF	17	Jens Jønsson	(yellow card) 77'	(substituted off) 85'
FW	7	Lasse Vibe (c)
FW	9	Nicolai Brock-Madsen		(substituted off) 79'
FW	12	Frederik Børsting
Substitutions:
FW	13	Emil Larsen		(substituted on) 60'
FW	10	Jacob Bruun Larsen		(substituted on) 79'
DF	3	Kasper Larsen	(yellow card) 87'	(substituted on) 85'
Manager:
Niels Frederiksen

Assistant referees:
Marvin Torrentera (Mexico)
Miguel Hernández (Mexico)
Fourth official:
Gehad Grisha (Egypt)

=== Brazil vs South Africa ===
4 August 2016
16:00

Brazil	0–0	South Africa
	Report (Rio2016); Report (FIFA)

Estádio Nacional Mané Garrincha, Brasília
Attendance: 69,389
Referee: Antonio Mateu Lahoz (Spain)

Brazil	South Africa

GK	1	Weverton
DF	2	Zeca
DF	3	Rodrigo Caio
DF	4	Marquinhos	(yellow card) 90+3'
DF	6	Douglas Santos		(substituted off) 84'
MF	5	Renato Augusto		(substituted off) 67'
MF	16	Thiago Maia	(yellow card) 73'
MF	17	Felipe Anderson		(substituted off) 60'
FW	9	Gabriel Barbosa
FW	10	Neymar (c)
FW	11	Gabriel Jesus
Substitutions:
MF	7	Luan Vieira		(substituted on) 60'
MF	8	Rafinha		(substituted on) 67'
DF	13	William		(substituted on) 84'
Manager:
Rogério Micale

GK	16	Itumeleng Khune
DF	2	Eric Mathoho	(yellow card) 90'
DF	4	Mothobi Mvala	(yellow card) 56' (yellow-red card) 59'
DF	5	Rivaldo Coetzee
DF	11	Maphosa Modiba		(substituted off) 70'
DF	13	Abbubaker Mobara
MF	7	Menzi Masuku		(substituted off) 58'
MF	14	Gift Motupa
MF	18	Deolin Mekoa
FW	10	Keagan Dolly (c)
FW	12	Lebo Mothiba
Substitutions:
FW	9	Tashreeq Morris		(substituted on) 58'
MF	15	Phumlani Ntshangase		(substituted on) 70'
Manager:
Owen Da Gama

Assistant referees:
Pau Cebrián Devis (Spain)
Roberto Díaz Pérez (Spain)
Fourth official:
Cüneyt Çakır (Turkey)

=== Denmark vs South Africa ===
7 August 2016
19:00

Denmark	1–0	South Africa
Skov 69'	Report (Rio2016); Report (FIFA)

Estádio Nacional Mané Garrincha, Brasília
Attendance: 32,314
Referee: Ryuji Sato (Japan)

Denmark	South Africa

GK	1	Jeppe Højbjerg
DF	2	Mikkel Desler
DF	4	Edigeison Gomes
DF	5	Jakob Blåbjerg
DF	15	Pascal Gregor
MF	6	Andreas Maxsø
MF	12	Frederik Børsting	(substituted off) 83'
MF	17	Jens Jønsson
FW	7	Lasse Vibe (c)
FW	9	Nicolai Brock-Madsen	(substituted off) 64'
FW	13	Emil Larsen	(substituted off) 61'
Substitutions:
FW	16	Robert Skov	(substituted on) 61'
FW	10	Jacob Bruun Larsen	(substituted on) 64'
DF	11	Jacob Barrett Laursen	(substituted on) 83'
Manager:
Niels Frederiksen

GK	16	Itumeleng Khune
DF	2	Eric Mathoho
DF	5	Rivaldo Coetzee
DF	6	Kwanda Mngonyama		(substituted off) 77'
DF	13	Abbubaker Mobara
DF	17	Tebogo Moerane		(substituted off) 46'
MF	11	Maphosa Modiba
MF	14	Gift Motupa
MF	18	Deolin Mekoa
FW	10	Keagan Dolly (c)
FW	12	Lebo Mothiba		(substituted off) 61'
Substitutions:
MF	7	Menzi Masuku		(substituted on) 46'
FW	9	Tashreeq Morris	(yellow card) 68'	(substituted on) 61'
MF	15	Phumlani Ntshangase		(substituted on) 77'
Manager:
Owen Da Gama

Assistant referees:
Toru Sagara (Japan)
Hiroshi Yamauchi (Japan)
Fourth official:
Fahad Al-Mirdasi (Saudi Arabia)

=== Brazil vs Iraq ===
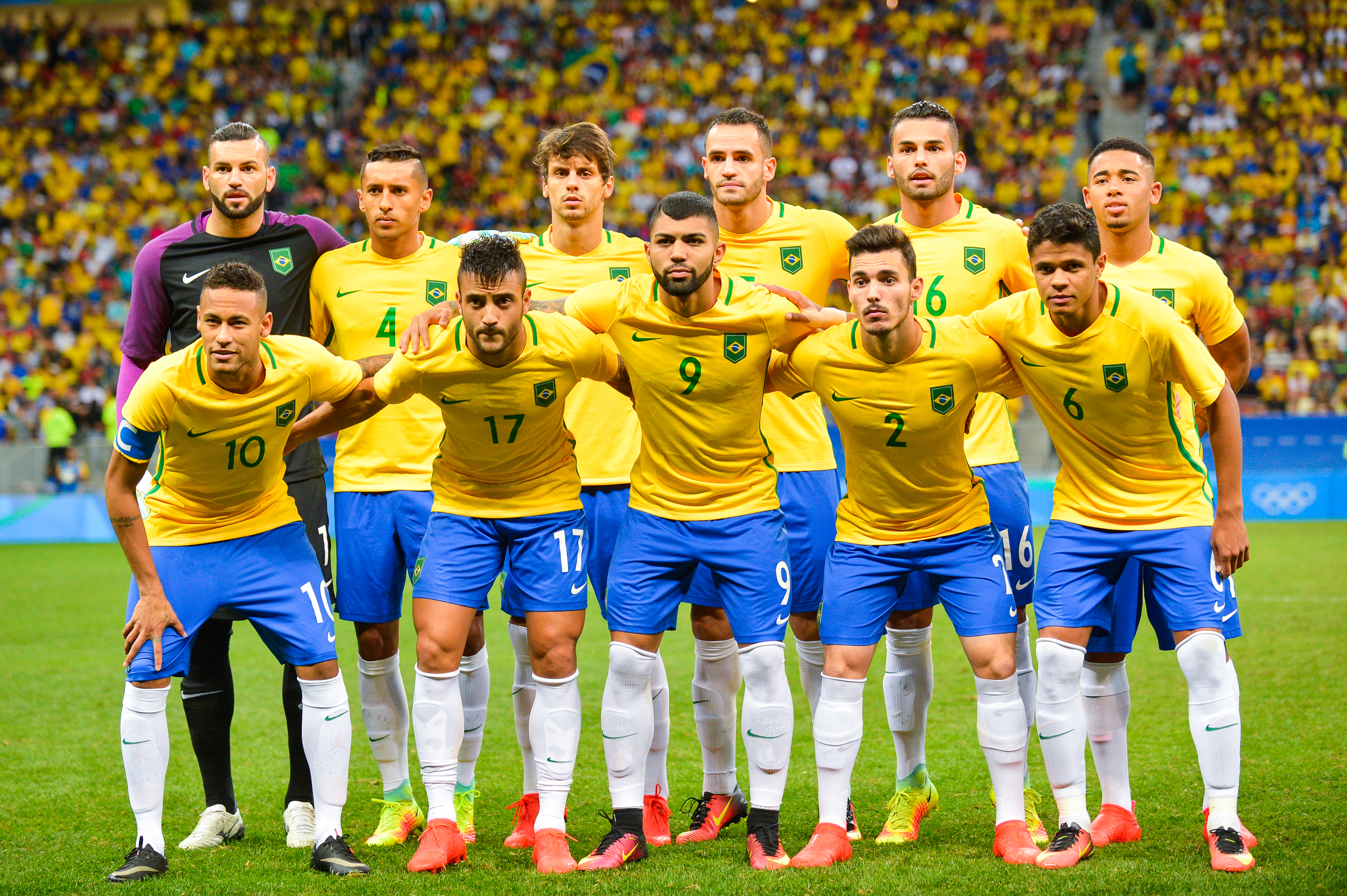
Brazil

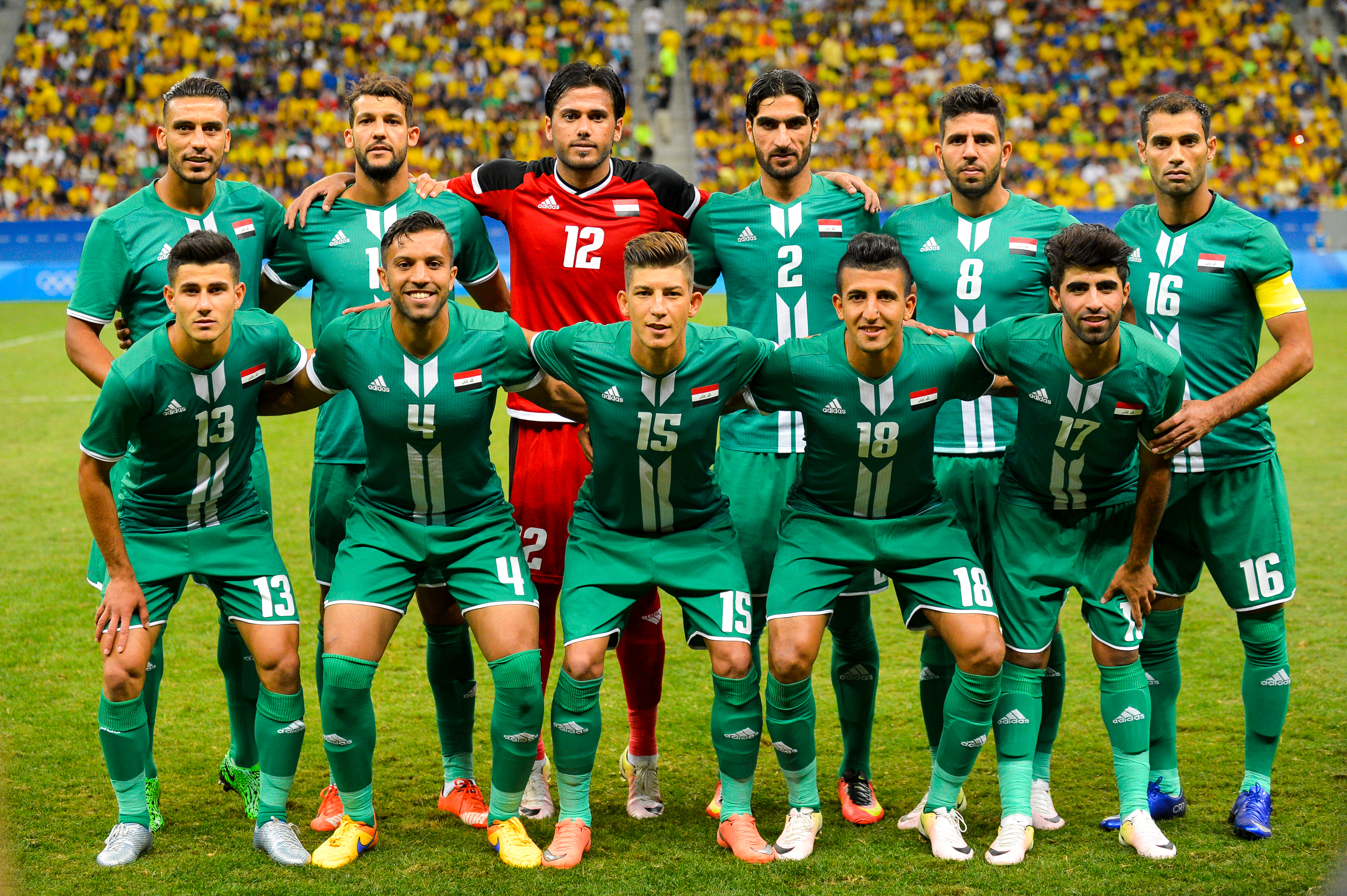
Iraq

7 August 2016
22:00

Brazil	0–0	Iraq
	Report (Rio2016); Report (FIFA)

Estádio Nacional Mané Garrincha, Brasília
Attendance: 65,829
Referee: Ovidiu Hațegan (Romania)

Brazil	Iraq

GK	1	Weverton
DF	2	Zeca
DF	3	Rodrigo Caio	(yellow card) 70'
DF	4	Marquinhos
DF	6	Douglas Santos	(yellow card) 69'	(substituted off) 80'
MF	5	Renato Augusto
MF	16	Thiago Maia	(yellow card) 17'
MF	17	Felipe Anderson		(substituted off) 46'
FW	9	Gabriel Barbosa
FW	10	Neymar (c)
FW	11	Gabriel Jesus		(substituted off) 55'
Substitutions:
MF	7	Luan Vieira		(substituted on) 46'
MF	8	Rafinha		(substituted on) 55'
DF	13	William		(substituted on) 80'
Manager:
Rogério Micale

GK	12	Mohammed Hameed	(yellow card) 76'
DF	2	Ahmad Ibrahim
DF	4	Mustafa Nadhim
DF	6	Ali Adnan
DF	14	Saad Natiq
DF	17	Alaa Mhawi	(yellow card) 35'
MF	16	Saad Abdul-Amir (c)	(yellow card) 37'	(substituted off) 79'
MF	18	Amjad Attwan
FW	8	Mohannad Abdul-Raheem		(substituted off) 84'
FW	13	Sherko Karim	(yellow card) 59'	(substituted off) 63'
FW	15	Dhurgham Ismail
Substitutions:
MF	11	Humam Tariq	(yellow card) 83'	(substituted on) 63'
DF	5	Ali Faez		(substituted on) 79'
FW	7	Hammadi Ahmad		(substituted on) 84'
Manager:
Abdul Ghani Shahad

Assistant referees:
Octavian Șovre (Romania)
Sebastian Gheorghe (Romania)
Fourth official:
Malang Diedhiou (Senegal)

=== Denmark vs Brazil ===
10 August 2016
22:00

Denmark	0–4	Brazil
	Report (Rio2016); Report (FIFA)	Gabriel 26', 80'; Jesus 40'; Luan Vieira 50'

Itaipava Arena Fonte Nova, Salvador
Attendance: 41,067
Referee: Alireza Faghani (Iran)

Denmark	Brazil

GK	1	Jeppe Højbjerg
DF	2	Mikkel Desler		(substituted off) 64'
DF	4	Edigeison Gomes
DF	5	Jakob Blåbjerg
DF	15	Pascal Gregor
MF	6	Andreas Maxsø	(yellow card) 39'
MF	12	Frederik Børsting		(substituted off) 81'
MF	17	Jens Jønsson
FW	7	Lasse Vibe (c)
FW	9	Nicolai Brock-Madsen		(substituted off) 46'
FW	10	Jacob Bruun Larsen
Substitutions:
FW	16	Robert Skov		(substituted on) 46'
DF	3	Kasper Larsen		(substituted on) 64'
MF	8	Mathias Hebo		(substituted on) 81'
Manager:
Niels Frederiksen

GK	1	Weverton
DF	2	Zeca		(substituted off) 74'
DF	3	Rodrigo Caio
DF	4	Marquinhos		(substituted off) 83'
DF	6	Douglas Santos
MF	5	Renato Augusto		(substituted off) 79'
MF	7	Luan Vieira
MF	12	Walace
FW	9	Gabriel Barbosa
FW	10	Neymar (c)
FW	11	Gabriel Jesus	(yellow card) 38'
Substitutions:
DF	13	William		(substituted on) 74'
MF	15	Rodrigo Dourado		(substituted on) 79'
DF	14	Luan Garcia		(substituted on) 83'
Manager:
Rogério Micale

Assistant referees:
Reza Sokhandan (Iran)
Mohammadreza Mansouri (Iran)
Fourth official:
Joseph Lamptey (Ghana)

=== South Africa vs Iraq ===
10 August 2016
22:00

South Africa	1–1	Iraq
Motupa 6'	Report (Rio2016); Report (FIFA)	Abdul-Amir 14'

Arena Corinthians, São Paulo
Attendance: 37,742
Referee: Roddy Zambrano (Ecuador)

South Africa	Iraq

GK	16	Itumeleng Khune
DF	3	Repo Malepe
DF	4	Mothobi Mvala	(yellow card) 12'
DF	5	Rivaldo Coetzee
DF	13	Abbubaker Mobara
MF	7	Menzi Masuku		(substituted off) 59'
MF	14	Gift Motupa
MF	15	Phumlani Ntshangase
MF	18	Deolin Mekoa
FW	10	Keagan Dolly (c)		(substituted off) 83'
FW	19	Andile Fikizolo		(substituted off) 61'
Substitutions:
MF	21	Thabiso Kutumela		(substituted on) 59'
MF	11	Maphosa Modiba		(substituted on) 61'
FW	9	Tashreeq Morris		(substituted on) 83'
Manager:
Owen Da Gama

GK	12	Mohammed Hameed
DF	2	Ahmad Ibrahim
DF	6	Ali Adnan	(substituted off) 62'
DF	14	Saad Natiq
DF	17	Alaa Mhawi
MF	9	Mahdi Kamel	(substituted off) 84'
MF	16	Saad Abdul-Amir (c)
MF	18	Amjad Attwan
FW	8	Mohannad Abdul-Raheem
FW	10	Ali Hosni	(substituted off) 62'
FW	15	Dhurgham Ismail
Substitutions:
FW	7	Hammadi Ahmad	(substituted on) 62'
FW	13	Sherko Karim	(substituted on) 62'
MF	11	Humam Tariq	(substituted on) 84'
Manager:
Abdul Ghani Shahad

Assistant referees:
Christian Lescano (Ecuador)
Byron Romero (Ecuador)
Fourth official:
Cüneyt Çakır (Turkey)
