= Football at the 2016 Summer Olympics – Men's tournament – Knockout stage =

The knockout stage of the men's football tournament at the 2016 Summer Olympics was played from 13 to 20 August 2016. The top two teams from each group in the group stage qualified for the knockout stage.

All times are local, BRT (UTC−3).

== Qualified teams ==
Group	Winners	Runners-up
A	Brazil	Denmark
B	Nigeria	Colombia
C	South Korea	Germany
D	Portugal	Honduras

== Bracket ==
In the knockout stages, if a match was level at the end of normal playing time, extra time was played (two periods of fifteen minutes each) and followed, if necessary, by a penalty shoot-out to determine the winner.

On 18 March 2016, the FIFA Executive Committee agreed that the competition would be part of the International Football Association Board's trial to allow a fourth substitute to be made during extra time.

Quarter-finals
13 August – São Paulo
Brazil	2
Colombia	0
13 August – Belo Horizonte
South Korea	0
Honduras	1
13 August – Salvador
Nigeria	2
Denmark	0
13 August – Brasília
Portugal	0
Germany	4

Semi-finals
17 August – Rio de Janeiro (Maracanã)
Brazil	6
Honduras	0
17 August – São Paulo
Nigeria	0
Germany	2

Gold medal match
20 August – Rio de Janeiro (Maracanã)
Brazil (p)	1 (5)
Germany	1 (4)
Bronze medal match
20 August – Belo Horizonte
Honduras	2
Nigeria	3

== Quarter-finals ==
=== Portugal vs Germany ===
13 August 2016
13:00

Portugal	0–4	Germany
	Report (Rio2016); Report (FIFA)	Gnabry 45+1'; Ginter 57'; Selke 75'; Max 87'

Estádio Nacional Mané Garrincha, Brasília
Attendance: 55,412
Referee: Walter López Castellanos (Guatemala)

Portugal	Germany

GK	1	Bruno Varela
DF	2	Ricardo Esgaio (c)
DF	4	Tobias Figueiredo
DF	5	Edgar Ié
MF	6	Tomás Podstawski
MF	7	André Martins	(substituted off) 58'
MF	8	Sérgio Oliveira	(substituted off) 36'
MF	10	Bruno Fernandes
MF	15	Fernando Fonseca
FW	11	Salvador Agra
FW	17	Carlos Mané
Substitutions:
MF	16	Francisco Ramos	(substituted on) 36'	(substituted off) 61'
FW	9	Gonçalo Paciência	(substituted on) 58'
MF	18	Tiago Silva	(substituted on) 61'
Head coach:
Rui Jorge

GK	1	Timo Horn
DF	2	Jeremy Toljan
DF	3	Lukas Klostermann
DF	4	Matthias Ginter
DF	5	Niklas Süle
MF	6	Sven Bender	(yellow card) 47'
MF	7	Max Meyer (c)	(yellow card) 50'
MF	8	Lars Bender		(substituted off) 72'
MF	11	Julian Brandt
MF	17	Serge Gnabry		(substituted off) 82'
FW	9	Davie Selke		(substituted off) 78'
Substitutions:
MF	16	Grischa Prömel		(substituted on) 72'
FW	18	Nils Petersen		(substituted on) 78'
DF	13	Philipp Max		(substituted on) 82'
Head coach:
Horst Hrubesch

Assistant referees:
Leonel Leal (Costa Rica)
Gerson López Castellanos (Guatemala)
Fourth official:
Fahad Al-Mirdasi (Saudi Arabia)

=== Nigeria vs Denmark ===
13 August 2016
16:00

Nigeria	2–0	Denmark
Mikel 15'; Umar 59'	Report (Rio2016); Report (FIFA)

Itaipava Arena Fonte Nova, Salvador
Attendance: 30,307
Referee: Sandro Ricci (Brazil)

Nigeria	Denmark

GK	18	Emmanuel Daniel
DF	2	Muenfuh Sincere	(yellow card) 44'
DF	4	Shehu Abdullahi
DF	6	William Troost-Ekong
DF	16	Stanley Amuzie
MF	10	John Obi Mikel	(yellow card) 69'
MF	14	Azubuike Okechukwu	(yellow card) 80'	(substituted off) 85'
MF	17	Usman Mohammed	(yellow card) 31'
FW	7	Aminu Umar
FW	9	Imoh Ezekiel (c)		(substituted off) 90'
FW	13	Umar Sadiq		(substituted off) 85'
Substitutions:
DF	15	Ndifreke Udo		(substituted on) 85'
FW	11	Junior Ajayi		(substituted on) 85'
MF	12	Popoola Saliu		(substituted on) 90'
Head coach:
Samson Siasia

GK	1	Jeppe Højbjerg
DF	2	Mikkel Desler	(substituted off) 71'
DF	4	Edigeison Gomes
DF	5	Jakob Blåbjerg
DF	15	Pascal Gregor
MF	6	Andreas Maxsø
MF	12	Frederik Børsting	(substituted off) 54'
MF	14	Casper Nielsen
MF	17	Jens Jønsson
FW	10	Jacob Bruun Larsen	(substituted off) 71'
FW	7	Lasse Vibe (c)
Substitutions:
FW	16	Robert Skov	(substituted on) 54'
FW	13	Emil Larsen	(substituted on) 71'
DF	3	Kasper Larsen	(substituted on) 71'
Head coach:
Niels Frederiksen

Assistant referees:
Emerson de Carvalho (Brazil)
Marcelo Van Gasse (Brazil)
Fourth official:
Diego Haro (Peru)

=== South Korea vs Honduras ===
13 August 2016
19:00

South Korea	0–1	Honduras
	Report (Rio2016); Report (FIFA)	Elis 59'

Mineirão, Belo Horizonte
Attendance: 36,704
Referee: Gehad Grisha (Egypt)

South Korea	Honduras

GK	18	Gu Sung-yun
DF	2	Sim Sang-min	(yellow card) 89'
DF	3	Lee Seul-chan	(yellow card) 45+1'
DF	6	Jang Hyun-soo (c)
DF	15	Jeong Seung-hyun
MF	8	Moon Chang-jin		(substituted off) 68'
MF	10	Ryu Seung-woo		(substituted off) 87'
MF	14	Park Yong-woo	(yellow card) 72'
MF	16	Kwon Chang-hoon
FW	7	Son Heung-min
FW	11	Hwang Hee-chan
Substitutions:
FW	9	Suk Hyun-jun		(substituted on) 68'
DF	5	Choi Kyu-baek		(substituted on) 87'
Head coach:
Shin Tae-yong

GK	1	Luis López	(yellow card) 70'
DF	3	Marcelo Pereira
DF	4	Kevin Álvarez	(yellow card) 53'
DF	5	Allans Vargas
DF	8	Johnny Palacios	(yellow card) 37'
DF	16	Brayan García
MF	6	Bryan Acosta (c)		(substituted off) 79'
MF	12	Romell Quioto
MF	15	Allan Banegas		(substituted off) 65'
FW	17	Alberth Elis		(substituted off) 90+2'
FW	9	Anthony Lozano
Substitutions:
MF	11	Marcelo Espinal		(substituted on) 65'
DF	2	Jonathan Paz		(substituted on) 79'
MF	13	Jhow Benavídez		(substituted on) 90+2'
Head coach:
Jorge Luis Pinto

Assistant referees:
Rédouane Achik (Morocco)
Waleed Ahmed (Sudan)
Fourth official:
Joseph Lamptey (Ghana)

=== Brazil vs Colombia ===
13 August 2016
22:00

Brazil	2–0	Colombia
Neymar 12'; Luan Vieira 83'	Report (Rio2016); Report (FIFA)

Arena Corinthians, São Paulo
Attendance: 41,560
Referee: Cüneyt Çakır (Turkey)

Brazil	Colombia

GK	1	Weverton
DF	2	Zeca
DF	3	Rodrigo Caio
DF	4	Marquinhos
DF	6	Douglas Santos
MF	5	Renato Augusto
MF	7	Luan Vieira
MF	12	Walace
FW	9	Gabriel Barbosa		(substituted off) 67'
FW	10	Neymar (c)	(yellow card) 40'
FW	11	Gabriel Jesus		(substituted off) 89'
Substitutions:
MF	16	Thiago Maia		(substituted on) 67'
MF	8	Rafinha		(substituted on) 89'
Head coach:
Rogério Micale

GK	1	Cristian Bonilla
DF	2	William Tesillo
DF	3	Deivy Balanta
DF	13	Helibelton Palacios	(yellow card) 10'
DF	17	Cristian Borja	(yellow card) 88'
MF	6	Jefferson Lerma	(yellow card) 39'
MF	12	Andrés Felipe Roa		(substituted off) 80'
MF	15	Wílmar Barrios	(yellow card) 45'	(substituted off) 46'
FW	8	Dorlan Pabón
FW	10	Teófilo Gutiérrez (c)	(yellow card) 90'
FW	11	Harold Preciado	(yellow card) 45+3'	(substituted off) 46'
Substitutions:
MF	14	Sebastián Pérez		(substituted on) 46'
FW	9	Miguel Borja		(substituted on) 46'
FW	7	Arley Rodríguez		(substituted on) 80'
Head coach:
Carlos Restrepo

Assistant referees:
Bahattin Duran (Turkey)
Tarık Ongun (Turkey)
Fourth official:
Clément Turpin (France)

== Semi-finals ==
=== Brazil vs Honduras ===
17 August 2016
13:00

Brazil	6–0	Honduras
Neymar 1', 90+1' (pen.); Gabriel Jesus 26', 35'; Marquinhos 51'; Luan Vieira 79'	Report (Rio2016); Report (FIFA)

Maracanã Stadium, Rio de Janeiro
Attendance: 52,457
Referee: Ovidiu Hațegan (Romania)

Brazil	Honduras

GK	1	Weverton
DF	2	Zeca
DF	3	Rodrigo Caio	(yellow card) 36'	(substituted off) 57'
DF	4	Marquinhos
DF	6	Douglas Santos
MF	5	Renato Augusto		(substituted off) 76'
MF	7	Luan Vieira
MF	12	Walace
FW	9	Gabriel Barbosa
FW	10	Neymar (c)
FW	11	Gabriel Jesus		(substituted off) 68'
Substitutions:
DF	14	Luan Garcia		(substituted on) 57'
FW	17	Felipe Anderson		(substituted on) 68'
MF	8	Rafinha		(substituted on) 76'
Head coach:
Rogério Micale

GK	1	Luis López
DF	2	Jonathan Paz	(yellow card) 59'
DF	3	Marcelo Pereira
DF	5	Allans Vargas	(yellow card) 23'	(substituted off) 46'
DF	8	Johnny Palacios	(yellow card) 62'
DF	16	Brayan García
MF	6	Bryan Acosta (c)	(yellow card) 21'	(substituted off) 72'
MF	11	Marcelo Espinal	(yellow card) 74'
MF	12	Romell Quioto
FW	17	Alberth Elis
FW	9	Anthony Lozano		(substituted off) 46'
Substitutions:
MF	13	Jhow Benavídez		(substituted on) 46'
MF	10	Óscar Salas		(substituted on) 46'
MF	15	Allan Banegas		(substituted on) 72'
Head coach:
Jorge Luis Pinto

Assistant referees:
Octavian Șovre (Romania)
Sebastian Gheorghe (Romania)
Fourth official:
Fahad Al-Mirdasi (Saudi Arabia)

=== Nigeria vs Germany ===
17 August 2016
16:00

Nigeria	0–2	Germany
	Report (Rio2016); Report (FIFA)	Klostermann 9'; Petersen 89'

Arena Corinthians, São Paulo
Attendance: 35,562
Referee: Néstor Pitana (Argentina)

Nigeria	Germany

GK	18	Emmanuel Daniel
DF	2	Muenfuh Sincere
DF	4	Shehu Abdullahi
DF	6	William Troost-Ekong
DF	16	Stanley Amuzie
MF	10	John Obi Mikel
MF	15	Ndifreke Udo	(yellow card) 19'	(substituted off) 71'
MF	17	Usman Mohammed
FW	7	Aminu Umar		(substituted off) 64'
FW	9	Imoh Ezekiel (c)
FW	13	Umar Sadiq
Substitutions:
FW	11	Junior Ajayi		(substituted on) 64'
MF	12	Popoola Saliu		(substituted on) 71'
Head coach:
Samson Siasia

GK	1	Timo Horn
DF	2	Jeremy Toljan
DF	3	Lukas Klostermann
DF	4	Matthias Ginter	(yellow card) 80'
DF	5	Niklas Süle
MF	6	Sven Bender		(substituted off) 75'
MF	7	Max Meyer (c)		(substituted off) 85'
MF	8	Lars Bender	(yellow card) 77'
MF	11	Julian Brandt
MF	17	Serge Gnabry	(yellow card) 4'	(substituted off) 77'
FW	9	Davie Selke
Substitutions:
MF	16	Grischa Prömel		(substituted on) 75'
DF	13	Philipp Max		(substituted on) 77'
FW	18	Nils Petersen		(substituted on) 85'
Head coach:
Horst Hrubesch

Assistant referees:
Hernán Maidana (Argentina)
Juan Pablo Belatti (Argentina)
Fourth official:
Antonio Mateu Lahoz (Spain)

== Bronze medal match ==
20 August 2016
13:00

Honduras	2–3	Nigeria
Lozano 71'; Pereira 86'	Report (Rio2016); Report (FIFA)	Sadiq 34', 56'; Umar 49'

Mineirão, Belo Horizonte
Attendance: 9,091
Referee: Sandro Ricci (Brazil)

Honduras	Nigeria

GK	1	Luis López
DF	2	Jonathan Paz
DF	3	Marcelo Pereira
DF	4	Kevin Álvarez
DF	5	Allans Vargas
DF	16	Brayan García		(substituted off) 46'
MF	6	Bryan Acosta (c)		(substituted off) 62'
MF	10	Óscar Salas
MF	12	Romell Quioto
MF	15	Allan Banegas		(substituted off) 61'
FW	17	Alberth Elis
Substitutions:
FW	9	Anthony Lozano	(yellow card) 87'	(substituted on) 46'
MF	11	Marcelo Espinal		(substituted on) 61'
MF	15	Jhow Benavídez		(substituted on) 62'
Head coach:
Jorge Luis Pinto

GK	18	Emmanuel Daniel
DF	2	Muenfuh Sincere	(yellow card) 77'
DF	4	Shehu Abdullahi
DF	6	William Troost-Ekong
DF	16	Stanley Amuzie
MF	10	John Obi Mikel
MF	14	Azubuike Okechukwu	(yellow card) 17'
MF	17	Usman Mohammed		(substituted off) 90+2'
FW	7	Aminu Umar
FW	9	Imoh Ezekiel (c)		(substituted off) 80'
FW	13	Umar Sadiq		(substituted off) 89'
Substitutions:
DF	3	Kingsley Madu		(substituted on) 80'
MF	12	Popoola Saliu		(substituted on) 89'
DF	5	Saturday Erimuya		(substituted on) 90+2'
Head coach:
Samson Siasia

Assistant referees:
Emerson de Carvalho (Brazil)
Marcelo Van Gasse (Brazil)
Fourth official:
Sergei Karasev (Russia)

== Gold medal match ==
The final pitted host Brazil against defending world champions Germany, with both teams seeking their first Olympic title despite having won a combined nine World Cups. Both opposing coaches — Rogerio Micale for Brazil and Horst Hrubesch for Germany — downplayed the fact that the gold medal match was a rematch of the 2014 World Cup semi-final in Belo Horizonte, known in Brazil as the Mineirazo after Germany had won 7–1.

Brazil took the lead through a first-half free kick from Neymar, the senior team captain and one of the Brazilian players who had lost the gold medal match in the London 2012 Olympic tournament against Mexico at Wembley. Opposing German captain Max Meyer then equalised in the second half for Germany with a half-volley off a cross. Neither team was able to score again after 120 minutes, meaning the final went to penalties for the first time since 2000 when Cameroon had beaten Spain in a shootout in Sydney. Both teams scored on their first four penalties, with the breakthrough coming when Weverton saved the German fifth penalty from substitute Nils Petersen. Neymar then converted Brazil's fifth penalty to seal Olympic gold for Brazil in football for the first time. Brazil's victory also meant that the team had won every major global tournament at least once (World Cup, Confederations Cup and Olympics) and was also the first host nation victory in an Olympic tournament since Spain won the Barcelona 1992 tournament.

20 August 2016
17:30

Brazil	1–1 (a.e.t.)	Germany
Neymar 27'	Report (Rio2016); Report (ESPN)	Meyer 59'
Penalties
Renato Augusto (penalty scored); Marquinhos (penalty scored); Rafinha (penalty scored); Luan Vieira (penalty scored); Neymar (penalty scored)	5–4	(penalty scored) Ginter; (penalty scored) Gnabry; (penalty scored) Brandt; (penalty scored) Süle; (penalty missed) Petersen

Maracanã Stadium, Rio de Janeiro
Attendance: 63,707
Referee: Alireza Faghani (Iran)

Brazil	Germany

GK	1	Weverton
RB	2	Zeca	(yellow card) 30'
CB	4	Marquinhos
CB	3	Rodrigo Caio
LB	6	Douglas Santos
CM	12	Walace
CM	5	Renato Augusto
RW	11	Gabriel Jesus		(substituted off) 95'
AM	7	Luan Vieira
LW	10	Neymar (c)
CF	9	Gabriel Barbosa	(yellow card) 44'	(substituted off) 70'
Substitutions:
MF	17	Felipe Anderson		(substituted on) 70'
MF	8	Rafinha		(substituted on) 95'
Head coach:
Rogério Micale

GK	1	Timo Horn
RB	2	Jeremy Toljan
CB	4	Matthias Ginter
CB	5	Niklas Süle	(yellow card) 89'
LB	3	Lukas Klostermann
DM	8	Lars Bender		(substituted off) 67'
DM	6	Sven Bender	(yellow card) 81'
AM	11	Julian Brandt
AM	7	Max Meyer (c)
SS	17	Serge Gnabry
CF	9	Davie Selke	(yellow card) 49'	(substituted off) 76'
Substitutions:
MF	16	Grischa Prömel	(yellow card) 80'	(substituted on) 67'
FW	18	Nils Petersen		(substituted on) 76'
Head coach:
Horst Hrubesch

Assistant referees:
Reza Sokhandan (Iran)
Mohammadreza Mansouri (Iran)
Fourth official:
Malang Diedhiou (Senegal)
