= Football at the 2016 Summer Olympics – Men's tournament final =

2016 Summer Olympic men's football final
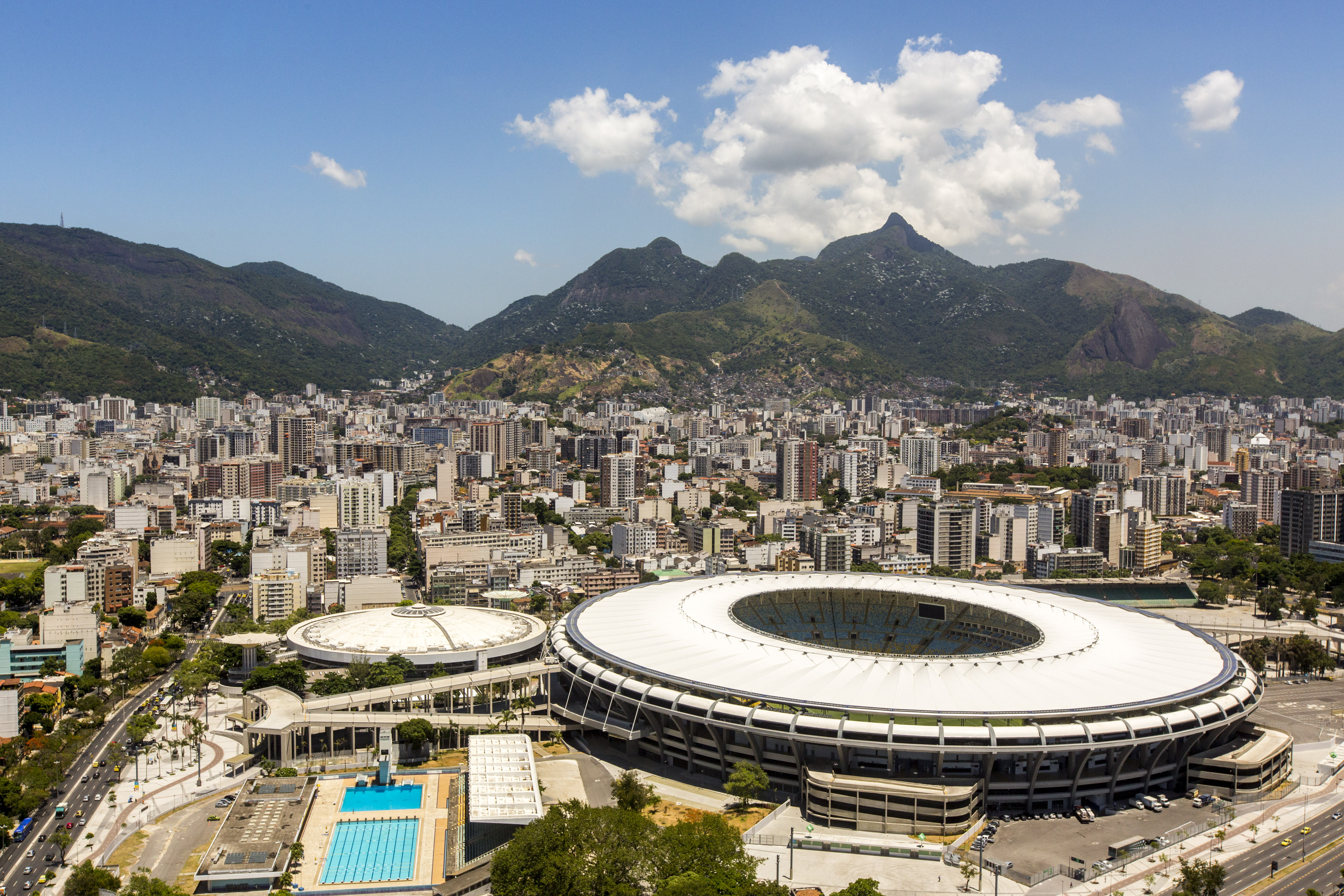
- Maracanã Stadium in Rio de Janeiro hosted the final
- Event: Football at the 2016 Summer Olympics – Men's tournament
Brazil	Germany
(Brazil)	(Germany)
1	1
- After extra time Brazil won 5–4 on penalties
- Date: 20 August 2016
- Venue: Maracanã Stadium, Rio de Janeiro
- Referee: Alireza Faghani (Iran)
- Attendance: 63,707

The 2016 Summer Olympic football gold medal match was a football match to determine the gold medal winners of men's football tournament at the 2016 Summer Olympics. The match was the 24th final of the men's football tournament at the Olympics, a quadrennial tournament contested by the men's national teams of the member associations of FIFA to decide the Olympic champions. The match was held at Maracanã Stadium in Rio de Janeiro, Brazil, on 20 August 2016, and it was played between hosts Brazil and Germany.

== Background ==
Both teams were seeking their first Olympic gold medal in the sport despite having won the FIFA World Cup nine times between them. Since the Olympic men's football was restricted to an under-23 tournament in 1992, Brazil had played in only one gold medal match, losing to Mexico in 2012. Germany, as a unified team or country, played in their first ever Olympic gold medal match. However, the former East Germany senior team won in 1976, before losing to Czechoslovakia in 1980.

The match was the first time the two nations had faced each other in a major tournament since Germany knocked out host Brazil in the semi-finals of the 2014 FIFA World Cup in Belo Horizonte, beating them 7–1 – Brazil's worst margin of defeat in a World Cup match. Both opposing coaches — Rogerio Micale for Brazil and Horst Hrubesch for Germany — downplayed the fact that the gold medal match was a rematch of the World Cup semi-final, dubbed the Mineiraço ([minejˈɾasu]) in Brazil in reference to the Mineirão stadium, which was the venue. Only two players – one on each team – had been in the World Cup squads but had not played in the semi-final. Neymar had been ruled out injured after he suffered a fractured vertebra in a collision with Colombia's Juan Zuniga in the quarter-finals, while Matthias Ginter was an unused substitute.

The two countries had also met at senior level in the 2002 FIFA World Cup final, with Brazil prevailing 2–0 at the International Stadium Yokohama. Germany was seeking to become the first nation to win Olympic gold in both men's and women's football, having become the first nation to play in both finals at the same Games and having won the women's tournament the previous day.

== Venue ==
The match was held at the Maracanã Stadium in Rio de Janeiro, Brazil. Prior to the 2016 Olympics, the stadium had hosted two FIFA World Cups, in 1950 and 2014 in addition to the 1989 Copa América. In addition to hosting the final, it also hosted the opening and closing ceremonies.

== Route to the final ==
Brazil
Round
Germany
Opponent
Result
Group stage
Opponent
Result
South Africa
0–0
Match 1
Mexico
2–2
Iraq
0–0
Match 2
South Korea
3–3
Denmark
4–0
Match 3
Fiji
10–0
Group A winners

Pos	Team	Pld	Pts
1	Brazil (H)	3	5
2	Denmark	3	4
3	Iraq	3	3
4	South Africa	3	2

Source: Rio2016 & FIFA
(H) Hosts
Final standings
Group C runners-up

Pos	Team	Pld	Pts
1	South Korea	3	7
2	Germany	3	5
3	Mexico	3	4
4	Fiji	3	0

Source: Rio2016 & FIFA
Opponent
Result
Knockout stage
Opponent
Result
Colombia
2–0
Quarter-finals
Portugal
4–0
Honduras
6–0
Semi-finals
Nigeria
2–0

== Match ==
=== Summary ===
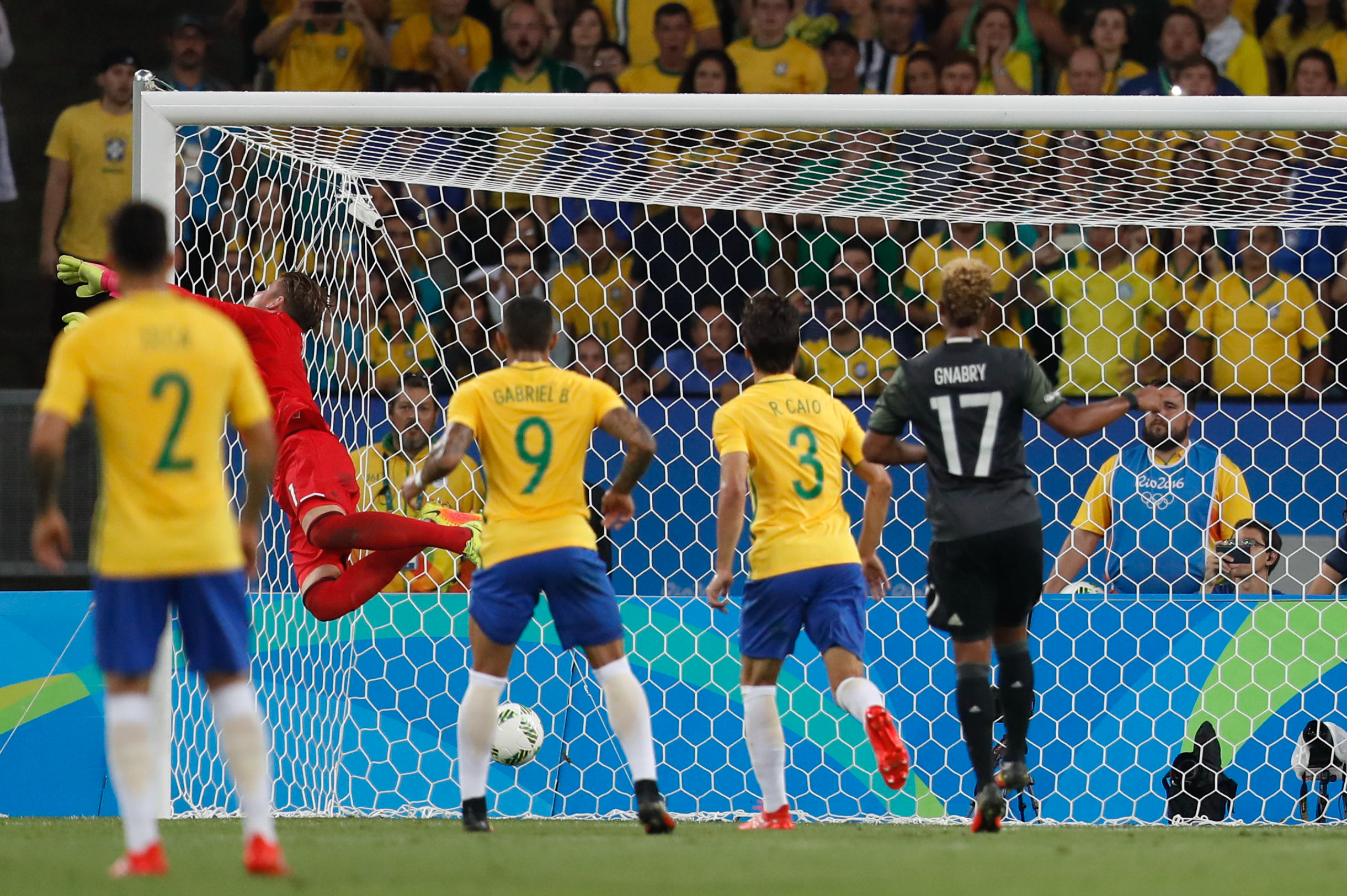
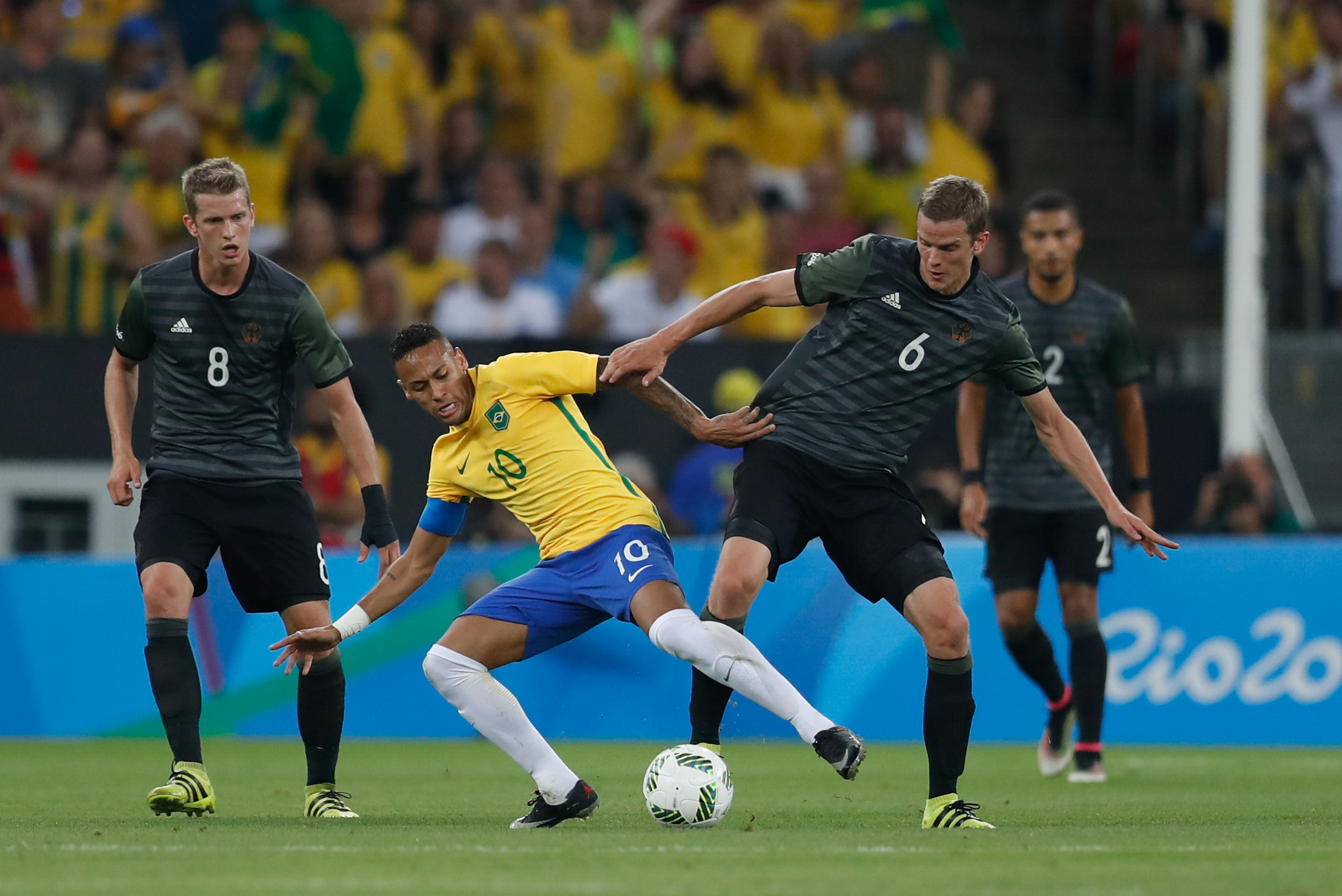
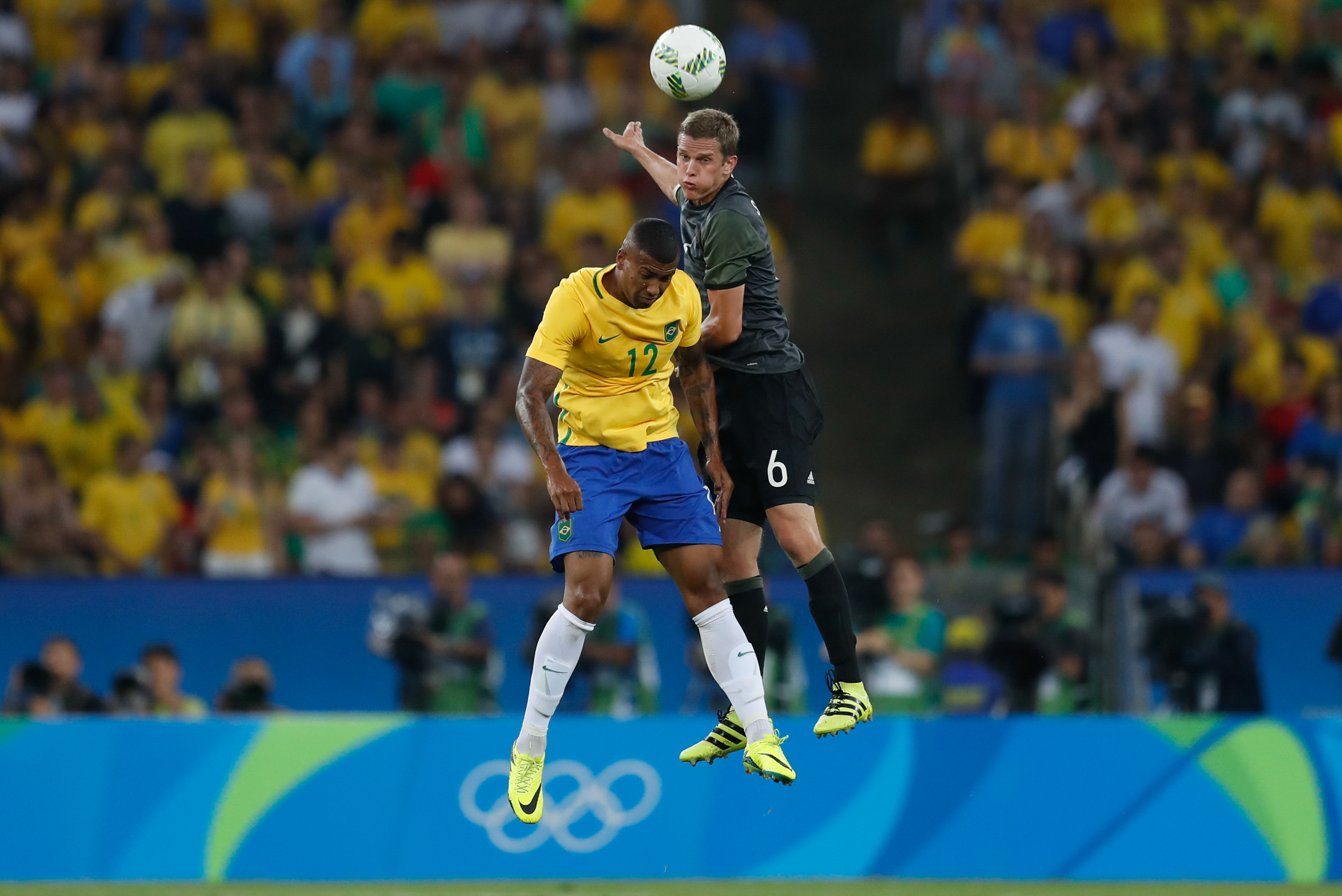
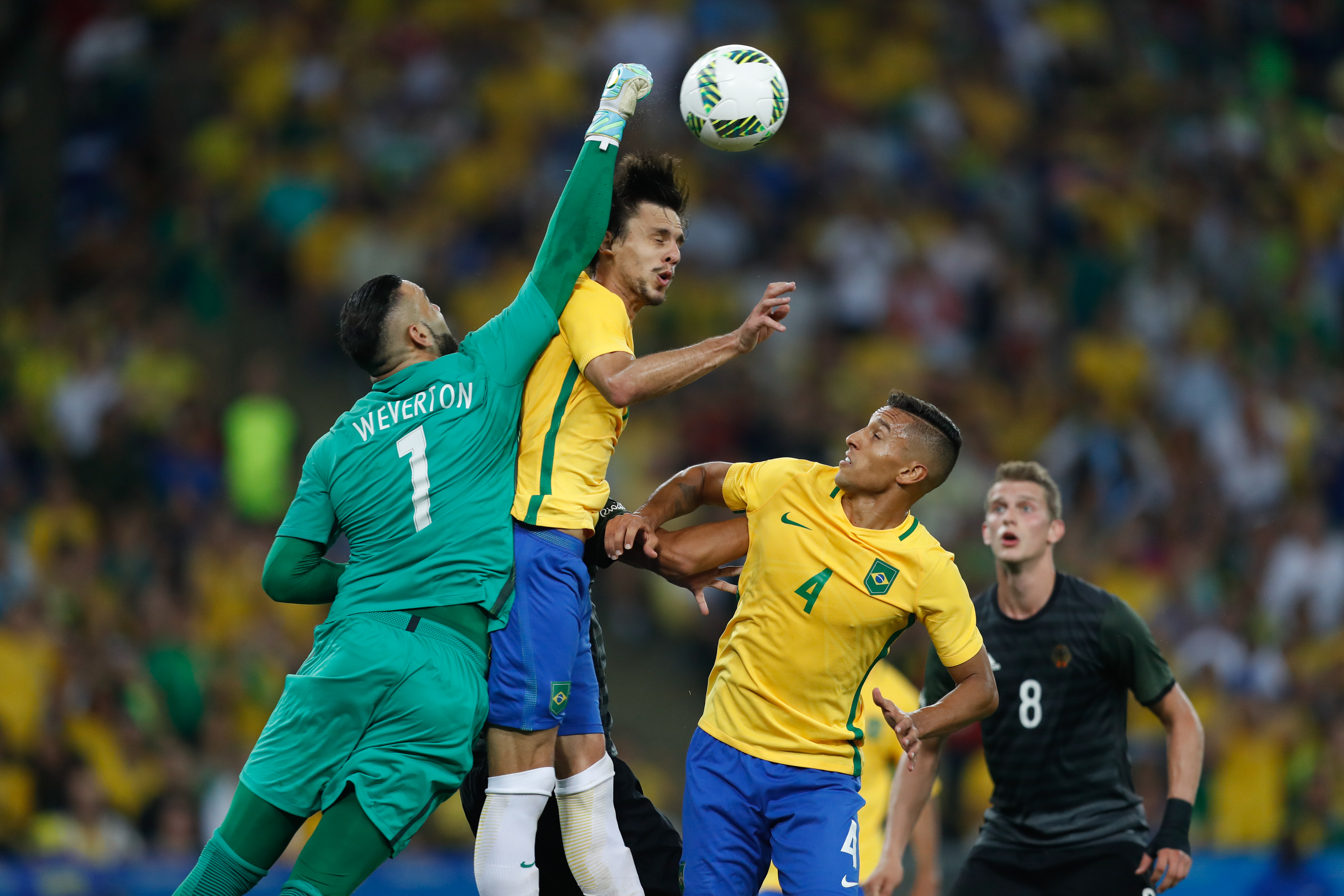
Action during the match

Brazil took the lead through a first-half free kick from Neymar, the senior team captain and one of the Brazilian players who had lost the gold medal match in the London 2012 Olympic tournament against Mexico at Wembley. Opposing German captain Max Meyer then equalised in the second half for Germany with a half-volley off a cross. Neither team was able to score again after 120 minutes, meaning the final went to penalties for the first time since 2000 when Cameroon had beaten Spain in a shootout in Sydney. Both teams scored on their first four penalties, with the breakthrough coming when Weverton saved the German fifth penalty from substitute Nils Petersen. Neymar then converted Brazil's fifth penalty to seal Olympic gold for Brazil in football for the first time.

=== Details ===
20 August 2016
17:30

Brazil	1–1 (a.e.t.)	Germany
Neymar 27'	Report (Rio2016); Report (ESPN)	Meyer 59'
Penalties
Renato Augusto (penalty scored); Marquinhos (penalty scored); Rafinha (penalty scored); Luan Vieira (penalty scored); Neymar (penalty scored)	5–4	(penalty scored) Ginter; (penalty scored) Gnabry; (penalty scored) Brandt; (penalty scored) Süle; (penalty missed) Petersen

Maracanã Stadium, Rio de Janeiro
Attendance: 63,707
Referee: Alireza Faghani (Iran)

Brazil	Germany

GK	1	Weverton
RB	2	Zeca	(yellow card) 30'
CB	4	Marquinhos
CB	3	Rodrigo Caio
LB	6	Douglas Santos
CM	12	Walace
CM	5	Renato Augusto
RW	11	Gabriel Jesus		(substituted off) 95'
AM	7	Luan Vieira
LW	10	Neymar (c)
CF	9	Gabriel Barbosa	(yellow card) 44'	(substituted off) 70'
Substitutions:
MF	17	Felipe Anderson		(substituted on) 70'
MF	8	Rafinha		(substituted on) 95'
Head coach:
Rogério Micale

GK	1	Timo Horn
RB	2	Jeremy Toljan
CB	4	Matthias Ginter
CB	5	Niklas Süle	(yellow card) 89'
LB	3	Lukas Klostermann
DM	8	Lars Bender		(substituted off) 67'
DM	6	Sven Bender	(yellow card) 81'
AM	11	Julian Brandt
AM	7	Max Meyer (c)
SS	17	Serge Gnabry
CF	9	Davie Selke	(yellow card) 49'	(substituted off) 76'
Substitutions:
MF	16	Grischa Prömel	(yellow card) 80'	(substituted on) 67'
FW	18	Nils Petersen		(substituted on) 76'
Head coach:
Horst Hrubesch

Assistant referees:
Reza Sokhandan (Iran)
Mohammadreza Mansouri (Iran)
Fourth official:
Malang Diedhiou (Senegal)

== Post match ==
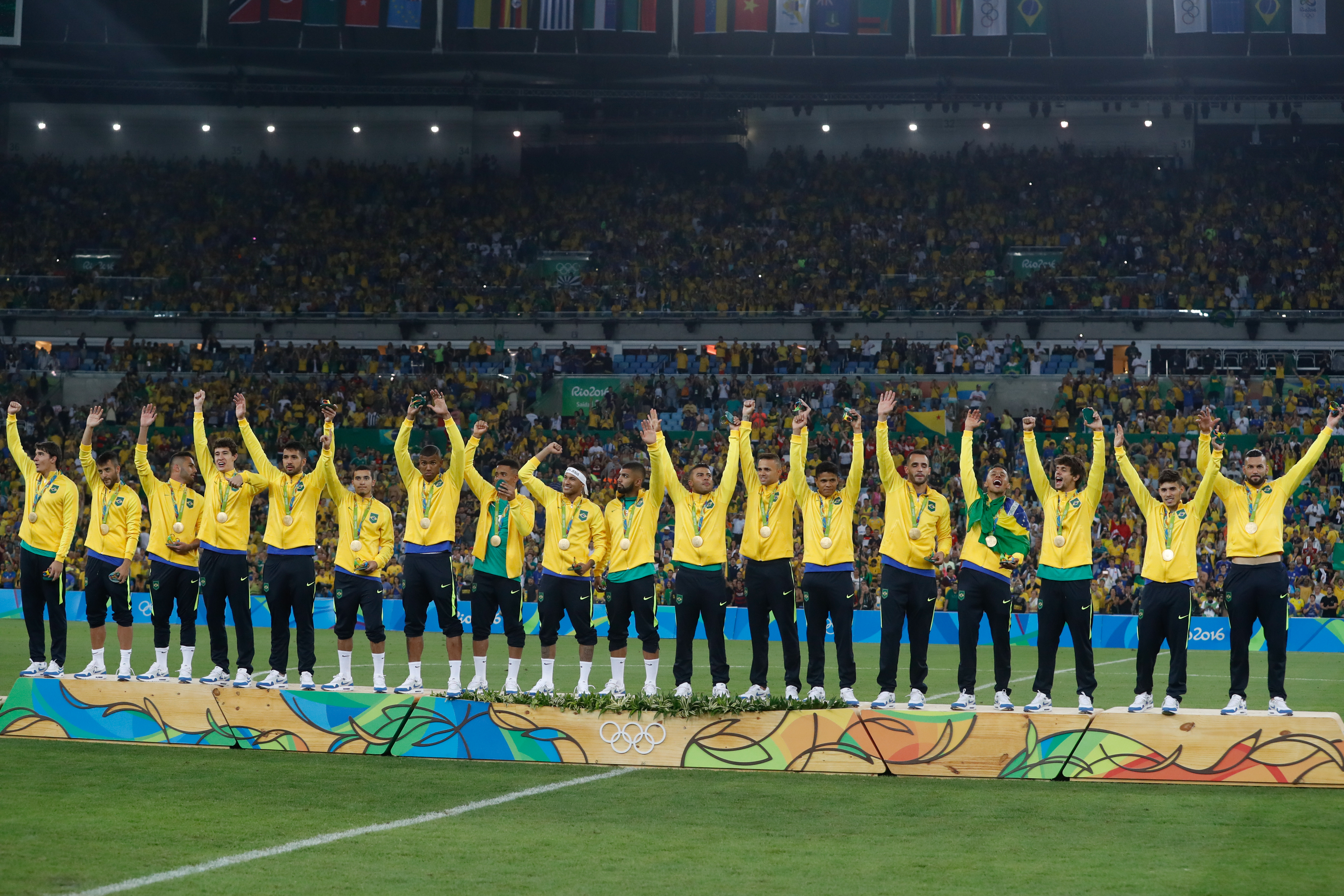
The Brazil squad celebrating victory on the podium following the receiving of their gold medals

Brazil's victory not only won them their first gold medal in the men's football tournament but was also one of seven gold medals won by Brazil in the 2016 Summer Olympics, which marked Brazil's record number of gold medals in a single Olympics and placed them 13th in the medal table. A Folha de S.Paulo video story highlighting fan reactions proclaimed in its title, "Quando a Olimpíada virou Copa (When the Olympics became the World Cup)".

Brazil's victory also meant that the team had won every major global tournament at least once (World Cup, Confederations Cup and Olympics) and was also the first host nation victory in an Olympic tournament since Spain won gold in Barcelona in 1992.
