= Estádio Nacional Mané Garrincha =

Football stadium and multipurpose arena in Brasília, DF, Brazil

Arena Mané Garrincha
- Mané Garrincha

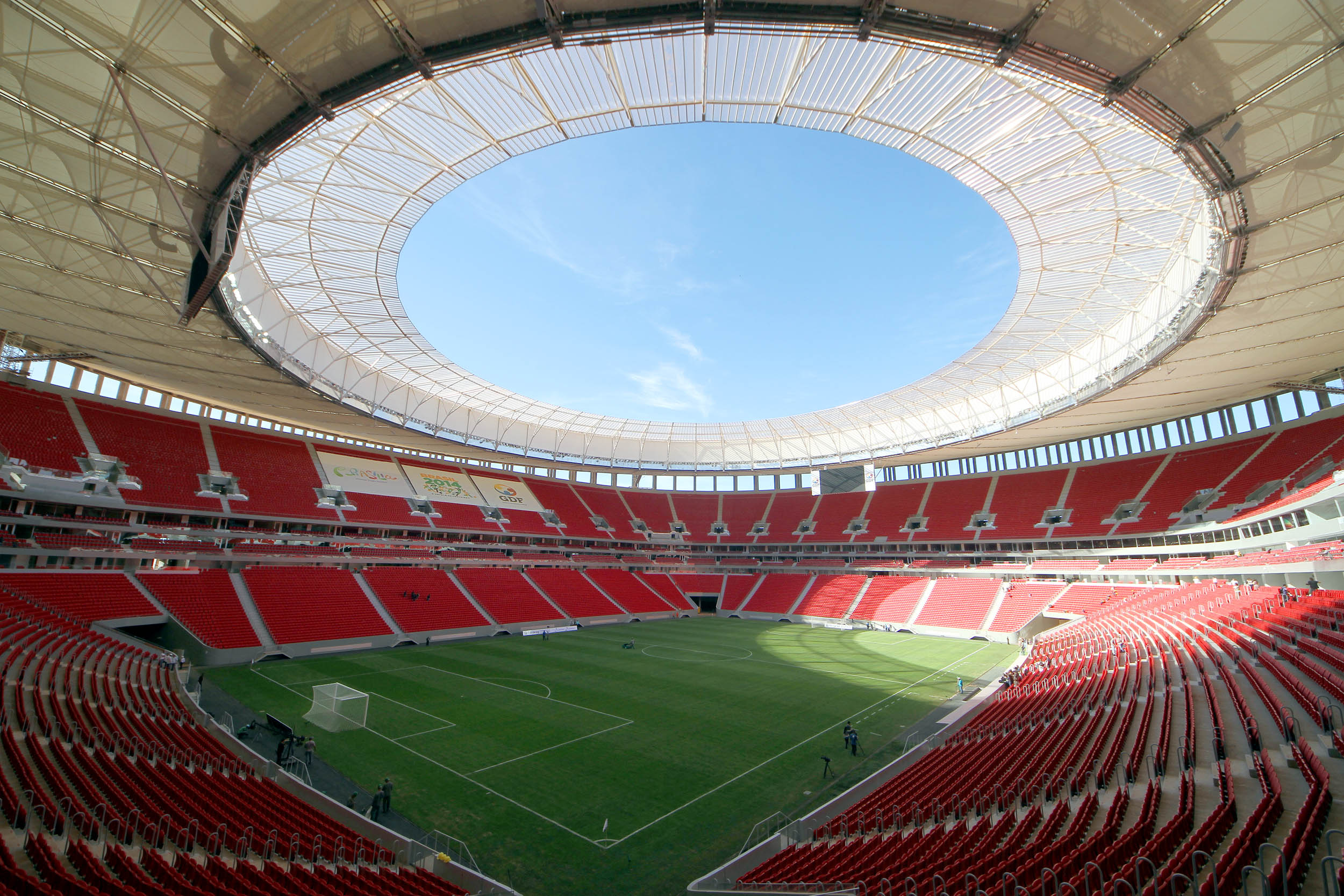
- Interior view of the stadium in 2013; Sisbrace
- Interactive map of Arena Mané Garrincha
- Former names: Estádio Governador Hélio Prates da Silveira; Estádio Nacional de Brasília Mané Garrincha; Arena BRB Mané Garrincha
- Location: SRPN Estádio Nacional Mané Garrincha; Brasília, DF, Brazil
- Coordinates: 15°47′1″S 47°53′57″W
- Owner: Terracap
- Capacity: 69,910
- Surface: Grass
- Field size: 105 x 68 m

Construction
- Built: 1972–1974
- Opened: 10 January 1974; 52 years ago
- Renovated: 2011–2013
- Cost: R$ 2 billion US$ 690 million EU€ 690 million

Tenants
- Brasília Futebol Clube; Legião FC; Brazil national football team (selected matches)

Website
- arenabsb.com.br

Arena Mané Garrincha, formerly Estádio Nacional de Brasília Mané Garrincha, also known as Estádio Nacional Mané Garrincha, Estádio Nacional de Brasília, or simply Mané Garrincha, is a football stadium and multipurpose arena, located in Brasília, in the Distrito Federal. The stadium is one of several structures that make up Brasília's Ayrton Senna Sports Complex. Since 2019, the stadium and its surroundings - including the Nilson Nelson Gymnasium - are under private administration. Opened in 1974, the stadium had a total capacity of 45,200 people. After having reconstruction completed between 2010 and 2013, the capacity was increased to 72,788 people, making it the second-largest stadium in Brazil after the Maracanã Stadium in Rio de Janeiro and one of the largest in South America.

It was re-inaugurated on 18 May 2013, following renovations completed in preparation for the 2013 FIFA Confederations Cup and 2014 FIFA World Cup. The original architect was Ícaro de Castro Mello. The project was completed at a cost of US$900 million, against an original budget of US$300 million, making the stadium the third-most expensive football stadium in the world after England's Wembley Stadium and Tottenham Hotspur Stadium.

Estádio Nacional Mané Garrincha is owned since December 2019 by Arena BSB company. The name is a homage to the football legend Mané Garrincha (1933–1983), who won the 1958 and 1962 World Cup with the Brazil national team. Between 2022 and April 2026, it was renamed Arena BRB Mané Garrincha as a result of a naming rights agreement between Arena BSB and Banco de Brasília.

== History ==
In 1974, the works on Estádio Mané Garrincha were completed. It was built when Garrincha was approximately 40 years old. The inaugural match was played on March 10 of that year, when Corinthians beat CEUB 2–1. The first goal of the stadium was scored by Corinthians' Vaguinho.

On March 2, 1996, it hosted the last concert of the legendary Brazilian band Mamonas Assassinas, after that the group suffered an airplane accident which left no survivors.

The old stadium's attendance record currently stands at 51,200, set on December 20, 1998, when Gama beat Londrina 3–0 at the 1998 Série B final, which gave Gama its first national trophy and consequent promotion to Série A in 1999.

On December 8, 2007, the final of the first edition of the Copa do Brasil de Futebol Feminino, won by Mato Grosso do Sul/Saad, was hosted at Estádio Mané Garrincha.

Brazil won the first game since the reopening of the stadium 3–0 against Japan on June 15, 2013, in the 2013 FIFA Confederations Cup.

In FIFA's 2014 World Cup, the stadium hosted 7 matches, including the 3rd-place playoff.

=== Chronology ===
==== 1970s ====
- March 10, 1975: Official inauguration of the Stadium named after Governor Hélio Prates da Silveira, who attended with the first football game of stadium, between the Corinthians and the CEUB, ree favor of Corinthians with the score of 2–1.

==== 1980s ====
- Decade of 1980s: The Stadium Governor Hélio Prates da Silveira is renamed to Mane Garrincha stadium.
- June 18, 1988: The Band Legião Urbana performs the first show of an artist on stadium, in what became known as one of the more troubled episodes in the career of the group.

==== 2000s ====
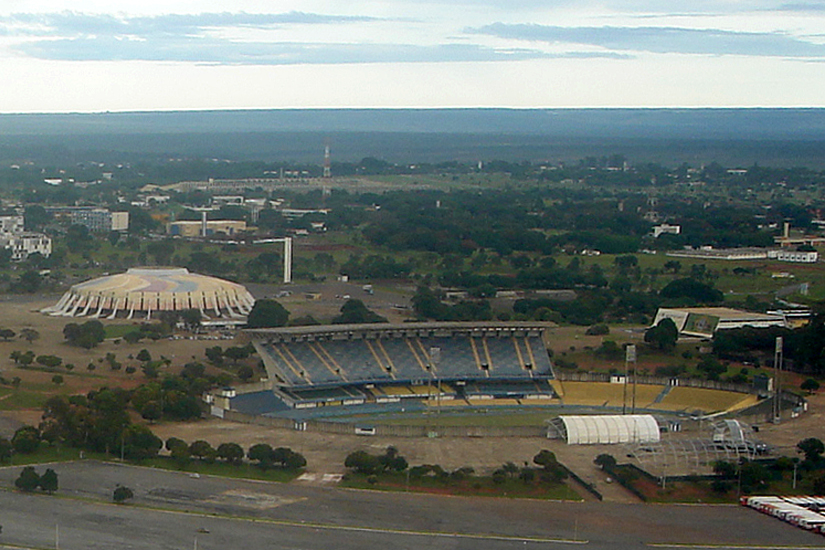
Estadio Nacional in 2006

- July 18, 2007: The governor, Jose Roberto Arruda, announces that the reconstruction of the stadium should be begun in 2007 and completed in 2009. The intentions are that the new stadium would become the largest stadium in America and one of the largest in the world, with approximately 100,000 seats.
- 18 February 2009: A public hearing reveals new information about the reconstruction of the stadium, including the prediction for the date of the beginning of works – July 2009.
- May 18, 2009: Governor Arruda presents the CBF changes in the design of the stadium.
- May 31, 2009: FIFA announces the 12 cities to host the 2014 World Cup. Brasília appears in the list.

==== 2010s ====
- 26 February 2010: The bidding to reconstruct the stadium is canceled by the Court of Auditors of the Federal District.
- 5 May 2010: IS started dismantling the Mane Garrincha stadium to give space to its reconstruction.
- July 7, 2010: The consortium formed by builders (Anrade Gutierrez) and Track Engineering wins the bid to reform the stadium.
- December 13, 2010: Works the stage follow for the step of foundations.
- May 15, 2011: After two unsuccessful attempts to demolish the still standing the Mane Garrincha stadium, consortium decided to continue with mechanical demolition.
- October 6, 2011: FIFA confirms Brasília as host city of the opening of the Confederations Cup.
- February 8, 2012: With construction of the pillars running, works reach 50% completion.
- August 28, 2012: With 72% of the work completed, Mane Garrincha concludes the ring of pillars of the structure.
- September 28, 2012: 76% of work is completed after finalization of the bleachers.
- October 4, 2012: Secopa-DF confirms that all the chairs of the stadium will be red.
- October 29, 2012: The GDF, through the Secretariat of Social Communication of the Federal District, announces that the stadium is 81% completed.
- November 27, 2012: beside the new stages of Manaus, Curitiba and Natal, Brasília is a candidate to receive games of state championships of Rio de Janeiro and São Paulo.
- December 11, 2012: With 84% of completed works, stage continues in the process of installing the cover.
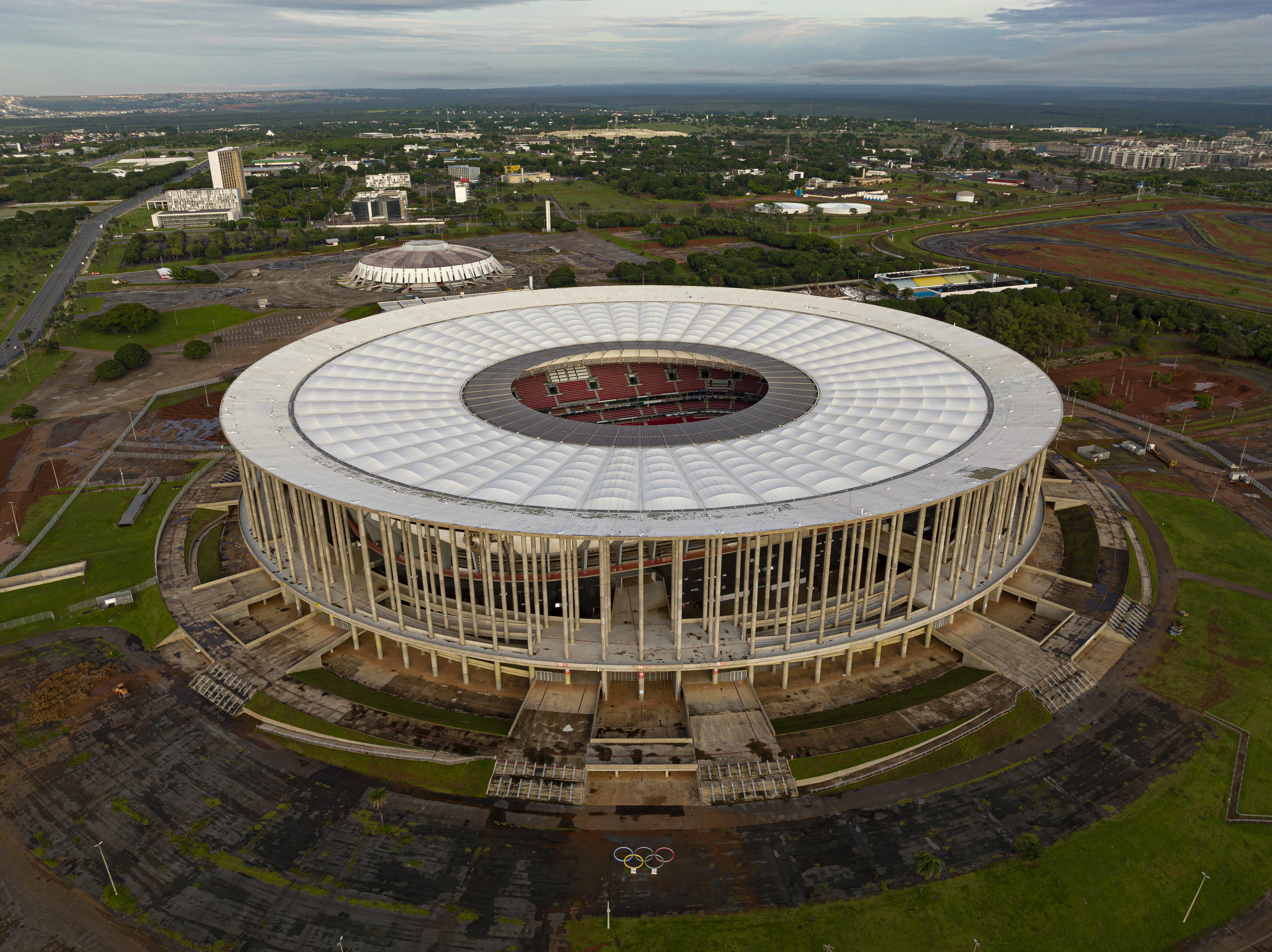
  External view of the stadium
- January 7, 2013: Having finalized the process of lifting cables of coverage, works reach 87% completion.
- 20 February 2013: starts the installation of membrane to cover the stage.
- March 26, 2013: The last module of the coverage of the stadium is installed. Works reach 94% completion.
- April 5, 2013: GDF discloses note reaffirming that the official name of the arena will not be changed to National Stadium of Brasília because of a supposed requirement of FIFA.
- April 15, 2013: The inauguration of the stadium is postponed to 18 May because of delays in the installation of turf.
- April 27, 2013: The first rolls of grass come to the stadium.
- April 30, 2013: Planting the lawn of the stadium is completed.
- 18 May 2013: With presence of president Dilma Rousseff, in addition to the governor of Federal District Agnelo Queiroz and several other national and local authorities, the stadium is officially reopened. In the afternoon there was the opening match for the Championship final Brasiliense Candangão, between Brasília and Brasiliense, which resulted in the victory of the Brasiliense by 3–0.

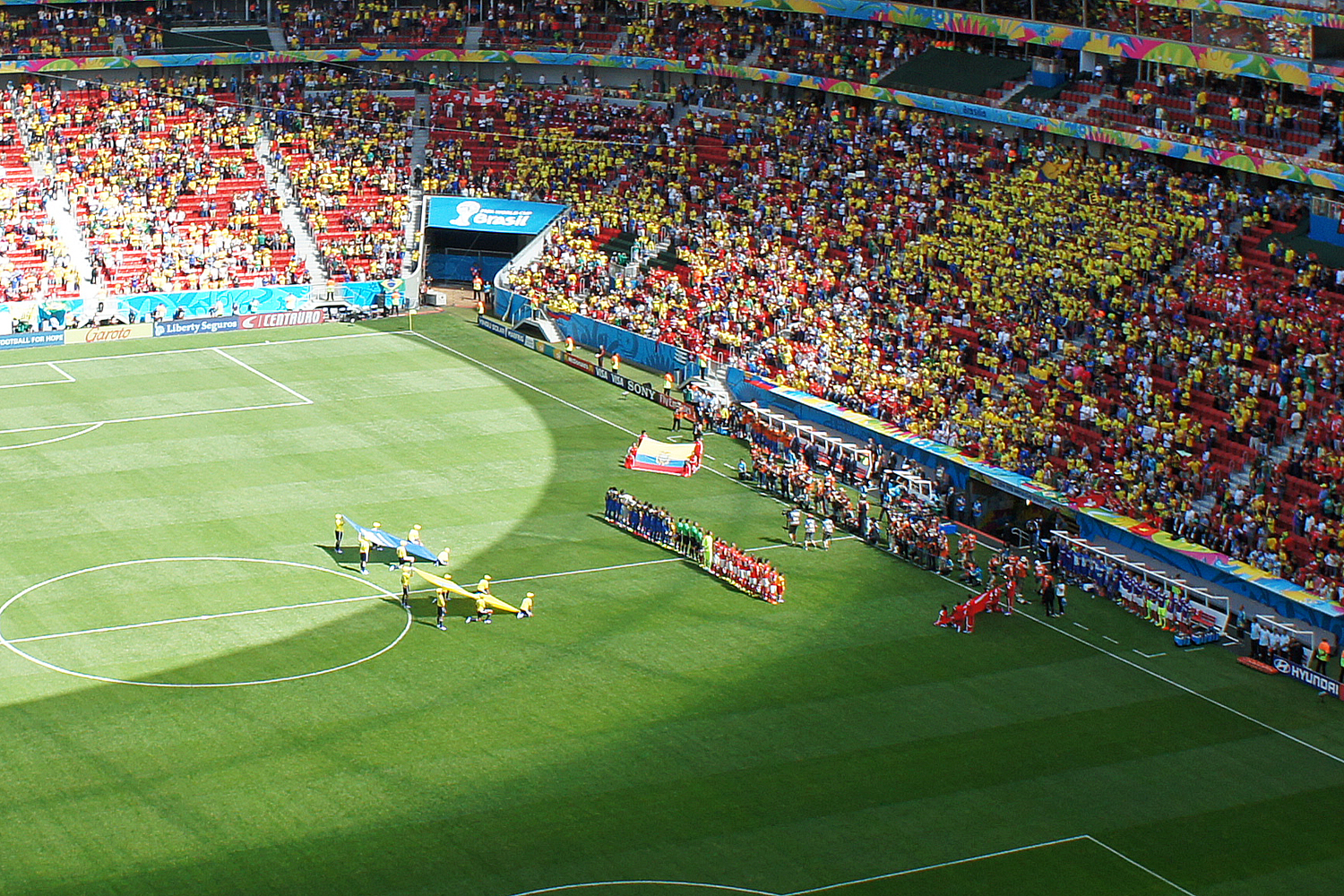
Estadio Nacional during Switzerland vs Ecuador

- 26 May 2013: As the second and last event-test before the 2013 FIFA Confederations Cup, the stadium received the opening match of the Brazilian Championship between Santos and Flamengo, which eventually resulted in a score of 0 to 0, but broke the record for the public stage and fundraising throughout the history of Brazil.
- June 15, 2013: The stadium received the opening of 2013 FIFA Confederations Cup, and the first game of the championship: Brazil 3 vs. 0 Japan, with goals of Neymar, Paulinho and Jô. The game broke the stadium's attendance record for the public stage: more than 67,000 fans attended.
- June 15, 2014: The stadium received the first game at the headquarters Brasília of 2014 FIFA World Cup as Switzerland defeated Ecuador 2–1. The game was headed for a draw until Haris Seferovic scored the latest game-winning goal in a group stage match in the tournament's history.
- June 19, 2014: Colombia defeated the Ivory Coast 2-1 and would qualify for its first knockout stage of a FIFA World Cup in 24 years.
- June 23, 2014: Brazil clinched Group A by defeating Cameroon 4–1, as Neymar scored twice in the match.

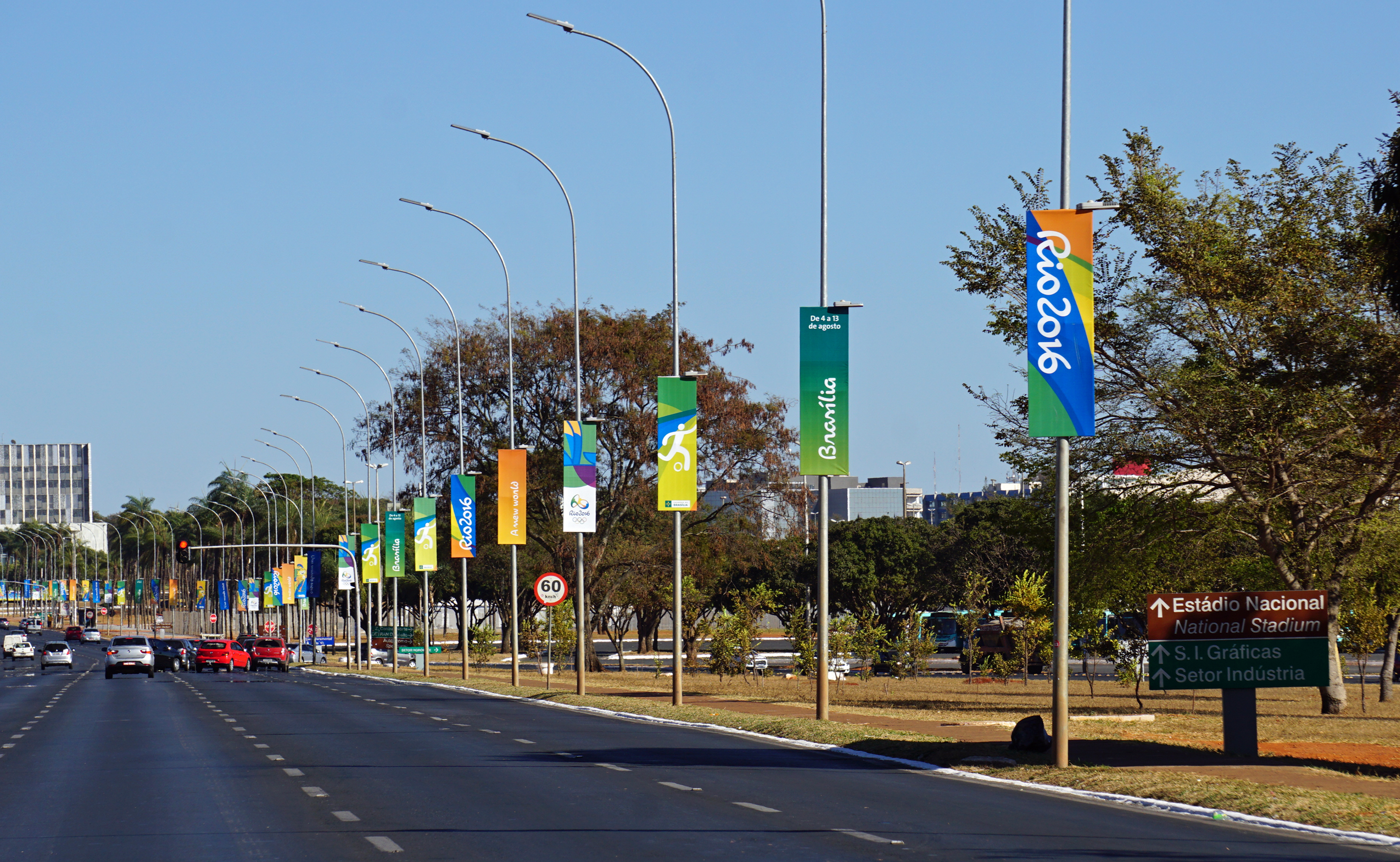
2016 Summer Olympics livery near Estádio Nacional Mané Garrincha. Brasília is the venue for ten men's and women's football competitions.

- June 26, 2014: Portugal defeated Ghana 2–1 in its group stage finale, with Cristiano Ronaldo scoring in the match to become the first Portuguese player to score at three consecutive World Cups. Unfortunately, the match was not enough to send Portugal into the knockout stages. The match was tied at 1-1, and had Ghana scored and won, Ghana would have advanced into the Round of 16 and the United States would have been eliminated at the group stage.
- June 26, 2014: France eliminated Nigeria in the Round of 16 by winning 2–0 to reach the quarterfinal.
- July 5, 2014: Argentina got an early goal from Gonzalo Higuain in the eighth minute against Belgium and it would be enough to send Argentina to its first semifinal in 24 years with a 1–0 victory.
- July 12, 2014: Brazil ended its World Cup campaign by losing 3–0 to Netherlands in the third place match. Goals from Robin van Persie, Daley Blind and Georginio Wijnaldum meant the Netherlands finished unbeaten at a World Cup for the first time and Brazil finished having allowed more goals at a World Cup that at any other tournament in its history.
- September 7, 2014: Brazil and Argentina played each other in a futsal match in which the hosts won 4–1. The attendance for that match was 56,483, a feat that more than doubled the previous high set 15 years earlier.
- August 4–13, 2016: Ten football matches for the 2016 Summer Olympics were held in Brasília's Estadio Nacional. Competitions included both men's and women's matches.

== Concerts ==
- Menudo: The Puerto Rican group presented at the stadium in 1985.
- Legião Urbana: The Brasiliense band made an official presentation at the stadium in June 1988. There were many unforeseen and confusion with the public of around 50,000 people, including home-made bombs that were thrown towards the stage, precipitating the end of the show. Hundreds of young people were hospitalized and many decided to publicly burn discs of Legião Urbana. Because of this incident, the band never performed in their hometown.
- A-Ha: The Norwegian group presented at the stadium in 1991.
- Information Society: On tour in Brazil, after the success in Rock in Rio, of 1991, the American group of synthpop presented in that same year in stage.
- Mamonas Assassinas: The quintet from Guarulhos held at the stage on what would be their final presentation of their career on 2 March 1996. After the show, they went to Brasília International Airport and boarded the plane with prefix PT-LSD, which crashed into the Serra da Cantareira near São Paulo/Guarulhos International Airport close to their hometown, at 23:16 later that day, killing the quintet themselves, which they were preparing to leave for Portugal the next day.
- Lenny Kravitz: American singer and guitarist, presented in the stadium his first tour show in Brazil. Lenny Kravitz, who was in the tour of the disc Baptism (released 2004), played at the stage on 19 March 2005.
- RBD: In 2006, the Mexican band during their "RBD Tour Brazil 2006" took about 25 thousand fans to Mane Garrincha stadium.
- Iron Maiden: Since coming to Brazil for the first time, the first Rock in Rio in January 1985, the English band of heavy metal never presented at the Federal District. In the touring world Somewhere Back in Time, the group made the dream of fans brasilienses come true ringing for 25,000 people in the stadium on March 20, 2009, in its eighth tour in Brazil.
- Black Eyed Peas: On 22 October 2010, the American group landed in the city for a show in the parking lot of the stadium, as part of The E. N. D. World Tour. About 12 thousand people attended.
- The Pop Music Festival 2011 : The festival pop, organized by Colombian singer Shakira, brought this and also the artists Train, Chimarruts, Ziggy Marley and Fatboy Slim for a show in the parking lot of the stadium, 17 March 2011 . However, because of an unusual temporal, which fell on the city, the show was rebooked for 24 March, this time relying on the presence of Shakira, Train and Chimarruts. Approximately 15,000 people attended the event, at day 24.
- Renato Russo: The stadium hosted on 29 June 2013, the show "Renato Russo Symphonic", in tribute to the singer and leader of the rock band Urban Legion, who died in 1996. The event was a hologram of the singer in the song "For Some Time" and had the participation of other artists such as Lobão, Zelia Duncan, Luíza Worklessness, Zizi came into view Worklessness, Sandra Sá and Ivete Sangalo have been confirmed, among others.
- Beyoncé: The American singer made the first international show of the new National Stadium Mane Garrincha on 17 September 2013, for an audience of about 30 thousand people. The show was part of The Mrs. Carter Show World Tour.
- Aerosmith: The American band made a presentation at the stadium on the day 23 October 2013 as part of its world tour Global Warming Tour.About 25 thousand people were present.
- Circuit Banco do Brasil: The Step Brasília festival took place in the parking lot of the stadium on 7 December 2013. At the festival there were presentations from artists such as Stevie Wonder, Jason Mraz, Ivete Sangalo have been confirmed, among others.
- Linkin Park: The band performed on 19 October 2014, during the Circuit Banco do Brasil. They performed again on 11 November 2025 as part of the From Zero World Tour.
- The hard rock band Guns N' Roses performed at the stadium during their Not In This Lifetime...Tour on 20 November 2016, with 42,307 attended the show.
- Bruno Mars: In 2024 the american singer performed two concerts at the stadium on October 26 and 27, as part of the Bruno Mars 2022-2024 Tour.

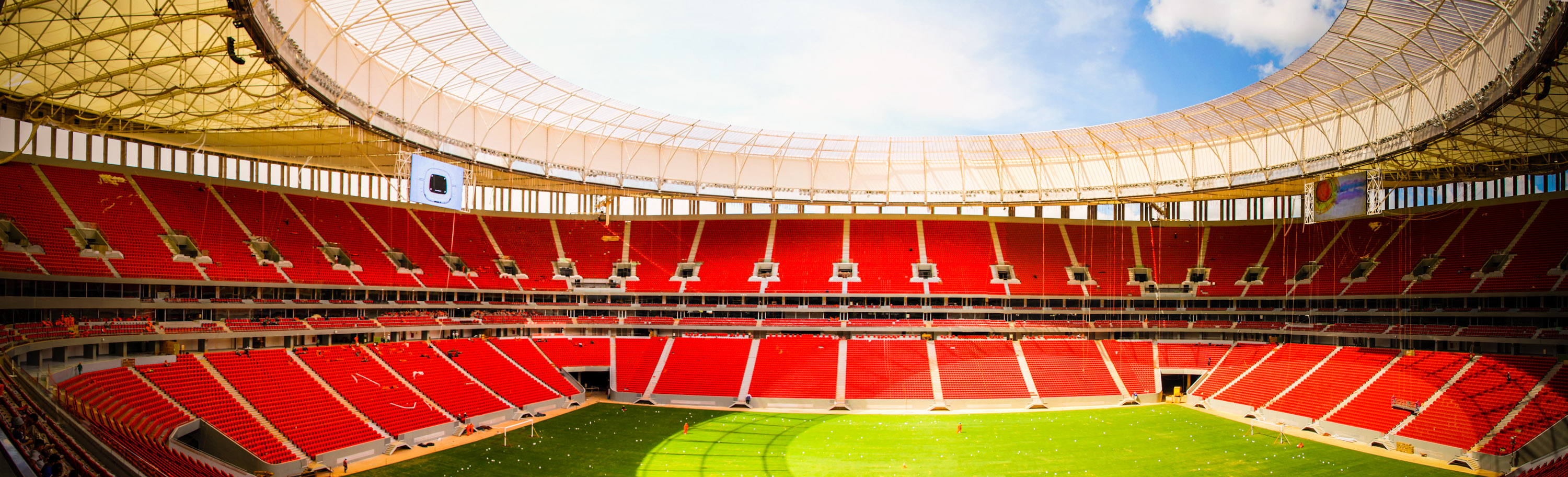
Panoramic view of the interior of the stadium after the completion of its reconstruction.

== Tournament results ==
=== 2013 FIFA Confederations Cup ===
Date	Time (UTC−03)	Team #1	Result	Team #2	Round	Attendance
June 15, 2013	16:00	Brazil	3–0	Japan	Group A	67,423

=== 2014 FIFA World Cup ===
The Mané Garrincha Stadium was demolished in 2010 to give way to a new stadium with a capacity of 72,788 fans and in order to reach the requirements for the 2014 World Cup, which was held in Brazil. The stadium was renamed in early 2010 to the Estádio Nacional Mané Garrincha and the construction began in April of the same year. The reconstruction involves dismantling the lower tier and retaining the upper tier into the new rectangular bowl, and reducing the size of the playing field so that the stadium can be a football-specific stadium.

Date	Time (UTC−03)	Team #1	Result	Team #2	Round	Attendance
June 15, 2014	13:00	Switzerland	2–1	Ecuador	Group E	68,351
June 19, 2014	13:00	Colombia	2–1	Ivory Coast	Group C	68,748
June 23, 2014	17:00	Cameroon	1–4	Brazil	Group A	69,112
June 26, 2014	13:00	Portugal	2–1	Ghana	Group G	67,540
June 30, 2014	13:00	France	2–0	Nigeria	Round of 16	67,882
July 5, 2014	13:00	Argentina	1–0	Belgium	Quarter-finals	68,551
July 12, 2014	17:00	Brazil	0–3	Netherlands	Third place match	68,034

=== 2016 Summer Olympics ===
The stadium also hosted some games in the football tournament of the 2016 Summer Olympics, held in Rio de Janeiro.

==== Men's Football ====
Date	Time (UTC-03)	Team #1	Result	Team #2	Round	Attendance
August 4, 2016	13:00	Iraq	0–0	Denmark	Group A	18,000
August 4, 2016	16:00	Brazil	0–0	South Africa	Group A	69,389
August 7, 2016	19:00	Denmark	1–0	South Africa	Group A	32,314
August 7, 2016	22:00	Brazil	0–0	Iraq	Group A	65,829
August 10, 2016	13:00	Argentina	1–1	Honduras	Group D	16,029
August 10, 2016	16:00	South Korea	1–0	Mexico	Group C	19,332
August 13, 2016	13:00	Portugal	0–4	Germany	Quarter-finals	55,412

==== Women's Football ====
Date	Time (UTC-03)	Team #1	Res.	Team #2	Round	Attendance
August 9, 2016	16:00	Germany	1–2	Canada	Group F	8,227
August 9, 2016	22:00	China	0–0	Sweden	Group E	7,648
August 12, 2016	13:00	United States	1–1 (a.e.t.) (3–4 pen.)	Sweden	Quarter-finals	13,892

=== 2021 Copa América ===
The stadium was one of the five venues to host matches of the 2021 Copa América, including the inaugural match between Brazil and Venezuela.

Date	Time (UTC−03)	Team #1	Result	Team #2	Round	Attendance
June 13, 2021	18:00	Brazil	3–0	Venezuela	Group B	0
June 18, 2021	21:00	Argentina	1–0	Uruguay	Group A	0
June 24, 2021	21:00	Chile	0–2	Paraguay	Group A	0
June 27, 2021	18:00	Venezuela	0–1	Peru	Group B	0
July 3, 2021	19:00	Uruguay	0–0 (2–4 pen.)	Colombia	Quarter-finals	0
July 6, 2021	22:00	Argentina	1–1 (3–2 pen.)	Colombia	Semi-finals	0
July 9, 2021	21:00	Colombia	3–2	Peru	Third place match	0

=== 2027 FIFA Women's World Cup ===
The stadium was one of the eight venues to host matches of the 2027 FIFA Women's World Cup.

Date	Time (UTC-03)	Team #1	Result	Team #2	Round	Attendance
25 June 2027	--:--	B1	v	B2	Group B	
27 June 2027	--:--	E3	v	E4	Group E	
1 July 2027	--:--	C4	v	C2	Group C	
4 July 2027	--:--	A4	v	Brazil	Group A	
6 July 2027	--:--	D4	v	D1	Group D	
8 July 2027	--:--	H2	v	H3	Group H	
13 July 2027	--:--	Winner Group H	v	Runner-up Group G	Round of 16	

== Urban improvement ==
The Government of the Federal District (GDF) has proposed several works of improvement for the Central Zone of Brasília after the reconstruction of the stadium, the additional cost of R$360 million, with completion scheduled for 2015, including:

- Tunnel linking the Choro Club and the City Park Dona Sarah Kubitschek
- Tunnel linking the National Stadium Mane Garrincha and Convention Center Ulysses Guimaraes
- Improvement in visual communication of the entire Multisports Complex Ayrton Senna
- New substation of Energy Company of Brasília
- Line 2 of tramway of Brasília
- Jumper between tracks W4 North/South and W5 North/South

=== Urban Project of Burle Marx ===
Between the interventions planned in the Central Area of Brasília, near the National Stadium Mane Garrincha, is the implementation of the Urban Project of Roberto Burle Marx, which provides for an improvement in landscaping between the Road Pilot Plan, and the Brasília TV Tower through the construction of water mirrors, bike paths, sidewalks, gardens and benches.
