= Tashreeq Morris =

South African soccer player

Personal information
- Full name: Tashreeq Morris
- Date of birth: 13 May 1994 (age 32)
- Place of birth: Mitchells Plain, Cape Town
- Height: 1.89 m (6 ft 2 in)
- Position: Forward

Team information
- Current team: Kaizer Chiefs
- Number: 40

Youth career
- Juventus FC
- Ajax Cape Town

Senior career*
| Years | Team | Apps | (Gls) |
| 2013–2019 | Ajax Cape Town | 119 | (22) |
| 2019–2022 | Cape Town City | 53 | (7) |
| 2022–2024 | Sekhukhune United | 23 | (1) |
| 2024–2025 | SuperSport United | 9 | (2) |
| 2025– | Kaizer Chiefs | 9 | (0) |

International career^{‡}
| 2016 | South Africa Olympic | 3 | (0) |
- * Club domestic league appearances and goals as of 4 January 2026 ‡ National team caps and goals as of 10:16, 4 October 2020 (UTC)

Tashreeq Morris (born 13 May 1994) is a South African soccer player who plays as a forward for Kaizer Chiefs.

== Club career ==
Morris joined the Ajax Cape Town youth academy from amateur club Juventus FC. He represented the club in a number of youth tournaments and was part of the winning squads for the Metropolitan Under-19 Premier Cup and the Copa Amsterdam. In July 2013, Morris was promoted to train with the first-team during preparation for the 2013–14 season. He made his league debut as a substitute against Kaizer Chiefs on 5 November 2013 and scored the winning goal in 1–0 victory.

He was released by Sekhukhune United in the summer of 2024.

=== Kaizer Chiefs ===
On 3 February 2025, Morris made his debut for Kaizer Chiefs after 3 days he signed for Kaizer Chiefs against AmaZulu.
