= Phumlani Ntshangase =

South African soccer player

Personal information
- Full name: Phumlani Nkosinathi Ntshangase
- Date of birth: 24 December 1994 (age 31)
- Place of birth: Durban, South Africa
- Height: 1.76 m (5 ft 9 in)
- Position: Midfielder

Team information
- Current team: Highbury

Senior career*
Years	Team	Apps	(Gls)
2013–2019	Bidvest Wits	86	(3)
2018–2019	→ SuperSport United (loan)	17	(0)
2019–2022	Maritzburg United	42	(0)
2022–2023	Baroka	5	(0)
2024–	Highbury	3	(0)

International career
2015	South Africa U23	5	(0)
2016	South Africa Olympic	3	(0)
- * Club domestic league appearances and goals as of 14 November 2024

Phumlani Nkosinathi Ntshangase (born 24 December 1994) is a South African soccer player who plays as a midfielder for Highbury.

== International career ==
Ntshangase was called up to the senior South Africa squad for the 2016 COSAFA Cup.

== Honours ==
Bidvest Wits

Runner-up

- Nedbank Cup: 2013–14
