= Deolin Mekoa =

South African footballer

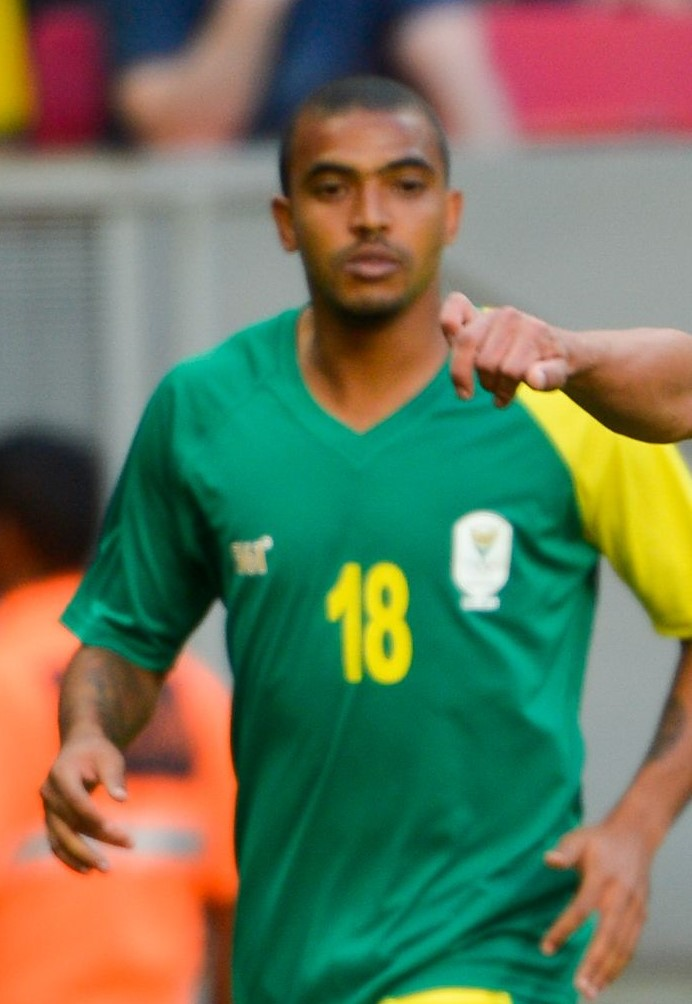
- Mekoa at the 2016 Olympics

Personal information
- Full name: Deolin Quade Mekoa
- Date of birth: 10 August 1993 (age 33)
- Place of birth: Wentworth, South Africa
- Height: 1.75 m (5 ft 9 in)
- Position: Winger

Team information
- Current team: Summerfield

Senior career*
Years	Team	Apps	(Gls)
2014–2020	Maritzburg United	119	(10)
2020	→ Ajax Cape Town (loan)	8	(0)
2021	Bizana Pondo Chiefs	10	(3)
2022–	Summerfield		

International career^{‡}
2015	South Africa U23	5	(0)
2016–	South Africa	4	(0)
2016	South Africa Olympic	3	(0)
- * Club domestic league appearances and goals as of 1 January 2022 ‡ National team caps and goals as of 4 October 2020

Deolin Quade Mekoa (born 10 August 1993) is a South African footballer who plays as a winger.

He represented South Africa in the football competition at the 2016 Summer Olympics.
