= Emmanuel Daniel =

Nigerian footballer

Emmanuel Shinkut Daniel
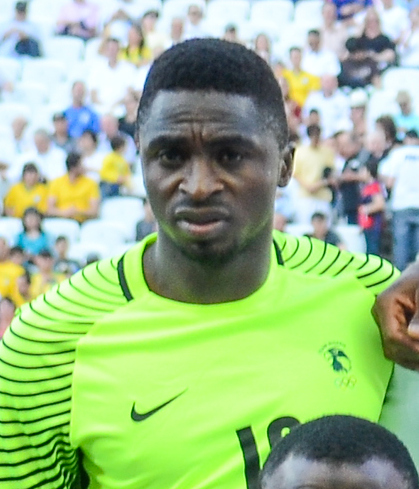
- Daniel at the 2016 Olympics

Personal information
- Full name: Emmanuel Shinkut Daniel
- Date of birth: 17 December 1993 (age 32)
- Height: 1.87 m (6 ft 1 1/2 in)
- Position: Goalkeeper

Team information
- Current team: Orlando Pirates

International career
Years	Team	Apps	(Gls)
2015–2016	Nigeria U23	25	
Medal record
Olympic Games
Bronze medal – third place	2016 Rio de Janeiro	Team

Emmanuel Shinkut Daniel (born 17 December 1993) is a Nigerian football goalkeeper. He represented Nigeria at the 2015 African Games and 2016 Summer Olympics.

== International career ==
Daniel got his first call up to the senior Nigeria side for a 2018 FIFA World Cup qualifier against Zambia in October 2016.

== Honours ==
Nigeria U23

- Olympic Bronze Medal: 2016
