= Saliu Popoola =

Nigerian footballer

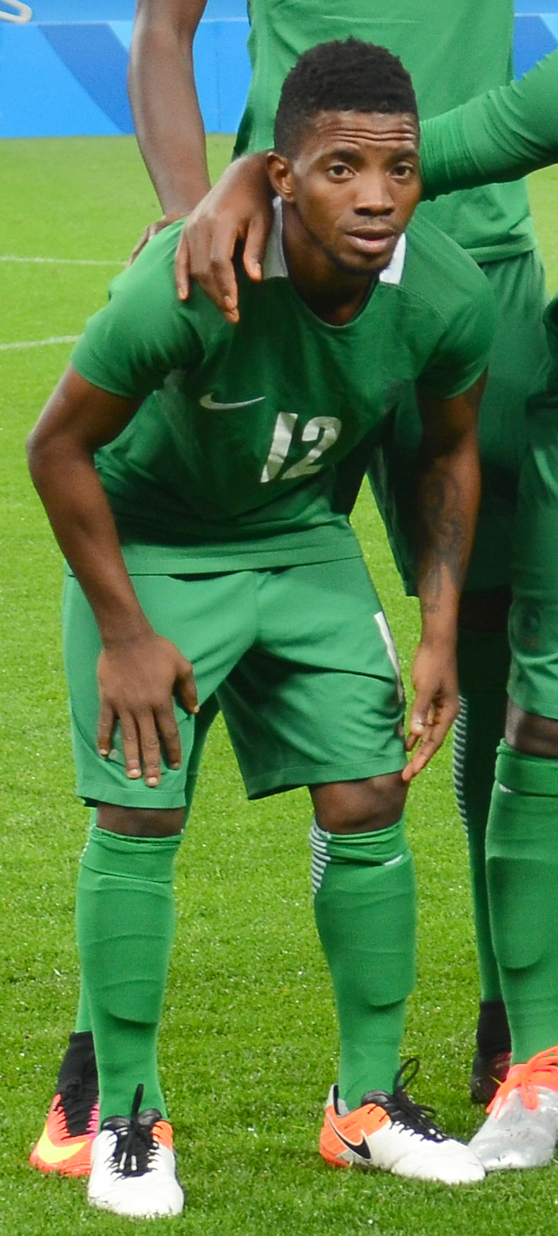
- Popoola at the 2016 Olympics

Personal information
- Full name: Saliu Popoola Sodiq
- Date of birth: 7 August 1994 (age 32)
- Place of birth: Lagos, Nigeria
- Height: 1.57 m (5 ft 2 in)
- Position: Midfielder

Youth career
- 36 Lions

Senior career*
Years	Team	Apps	(Gls)
2012–2016	Metz	0	(0)
2014–2016	→ Seraing (loan)	51	(4)
2017–2020	Ittihad Khemisset	29	(1)
2020–	Wydad Fès	5	(0)

International career
2016	Nigeria U23	5	(0)
Medal record
Olympic Games
Bronze medal – third place	2016 Rio de Janeiro	Team
- * Club domestic league appearances and goals as of 20:59, 1 August 2021 (UTC)

Saliu Popoola (born 7 August 1994) is a Nigerian professional footballer who plays as a midfielder for Moroccan club Wydad Fès. He is also a Nigerian international.

Measuring only 1.57 m, he was considered, in 2015, to be the third smallest professional player in the world. With the Nigeria U23 team, he won the bronze medal at the 2016 Summer Olympics.

== Career ==
Popoola joined [[FC Metz]Metz]] in August 2012, after a successful trial with the team. He would play for the reserves in the CFA. The following season, he made two appearances in the Coupe de France, but none in Ligue 2 where the Metz first team played.

In lack of playing time, he was sent on a two-season loan to Belgian club Seraing for two seasons, until June 2016. With a height of only 1.57 m, he was then the smallest professional player playing in Belgium. With Seraing, he made 51 appearances in the Belgian second division, scoring 4 goals. Most notably, he scored a brace against Heist on 29 November 2015, which proved to be the key to the 5–2 win.

In September 2016, having still not made a league appearance for the Metz first-team, he terminated his contract with the club by mutual consent.

== Honours ==
Nigeria U23

- Olympic Bronze Medal: 2016
