= Edigeison Gomes =

Guinea-Bissauan footballer (born 1988)

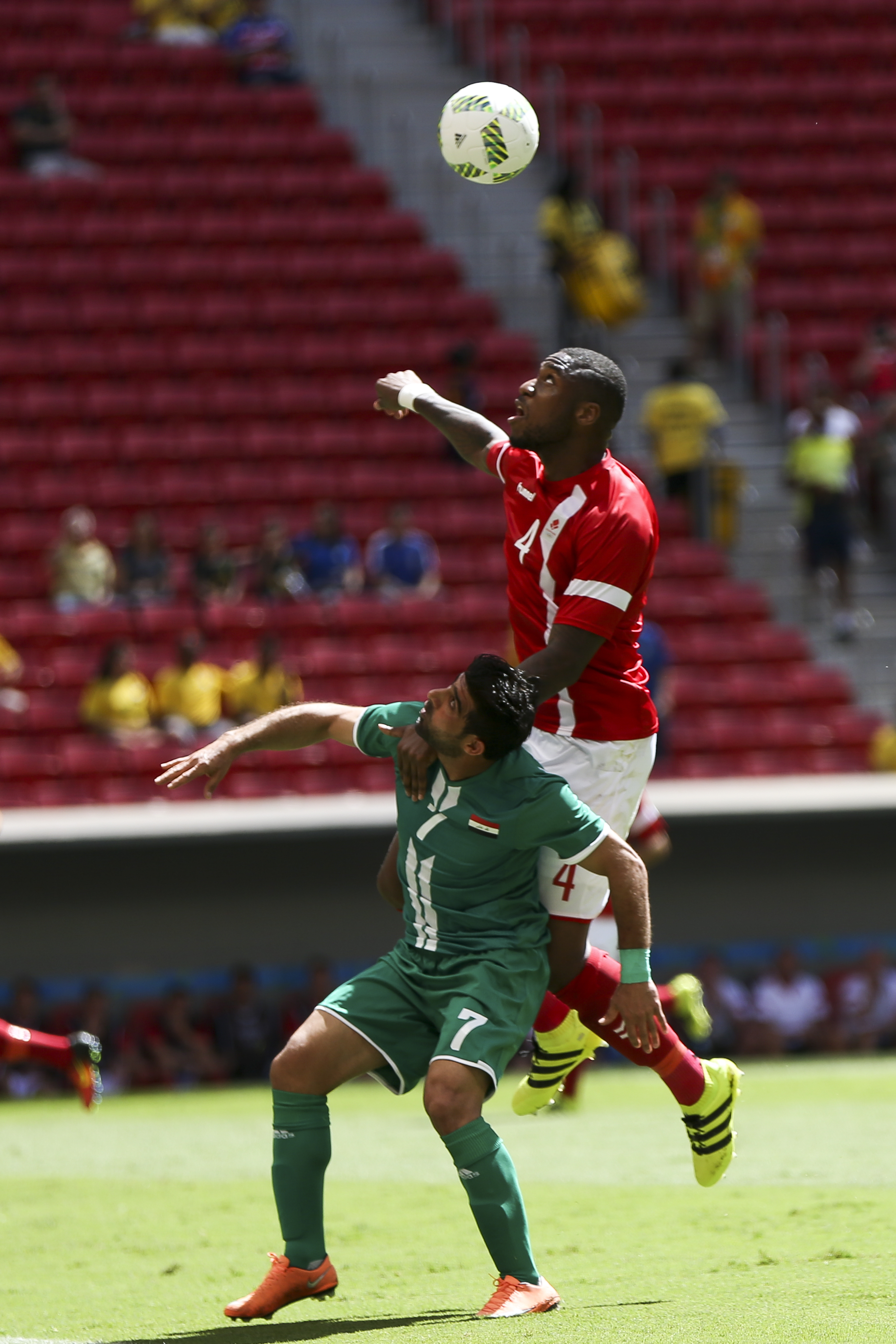
- Gomes (right) heading the ball during 2016 Summer Olympics, representing Denmark

Personal information
- Full name: Edigerson Gomes D'Almeida
- Date of birth: 17 November 1988 (age 37)
- Place of birth: Bissau, Guinea-Bissau
- Height: 1.96 m (6 ft 5 in)
- Position: Centre-back

Team information
- Current team: FC ESPM

Youth career
- BK Vestia
- Herlev IF

Senior career*
Years	Team	Apps	(Gls)
2011–2013	Herlev IF	0	(0)
2013–2014	HB Køge	32	(3)
2014–2015	Esbjerg fB	13	(1)
2015–2019	Henan Jianye	62	(4)
2018	→ FH (loan)	15	(1)
2020–2022	HB Køge	34	(2)
2022–	FC ESPM		

International career^{‡}
2016	Denmark Olympic	4	(0)
2017–	Guinea-Bissau	4	(1)
- * Club domestic league appearances and goals as of 19:44, 20 December 2021 (UTC) ‡ National team caps and goals as of 13:29, 24 October 2020 (UTC)

Edigerson Gomes D'Almeida (born 17 November 1988) is a Bissau-Guinean professional footballer who plays as a centre-back for the Guinea-Bissau national team.

== Early life ==
Gomes was born in Guinea-Bissau and moved to Portugal at the age of 6 with his mother. However, when he was 11, he moved with his father and Danish stepmother to Denmark.

== Club career ==
Gomes started his professional football career when he was promoted to the Danish club Herlev IF's senior squad within the 2011–12 league season.

Gomes made his professional debut with Esbjerg in the qualifying of the Europa League in a match against Kairat 17 July 2014. Four days later, he appeared in his first top level match in the Superliga, in a 1–0 victory against Randers.

On 21 January 2015, Gomes transferred to Chinese Super League side Henan Jianye.

Left without club, Gomes trained with his former club, HB Køge, in 2020. He signed a short deal with the club on 21 May 2020 for the rest of the season. In July 2020, he signed a new one-year deal with Køge. In May 2021, Gomes once again signed a contract extension with Køge, this time until the end of 2022. However, on 31 January 2022 it was confirmed, that Gomes' contract had been terminated by mutual agreement.

== International career ==
Gomes represented Denmark Olympic at the 2016 Summer Olympics as one of the three allowed players with no age limit. At the end of May 2017, he agreed to play officially for Guinea-Bissau. He made his international debut on 10 June 2017 and scored the only goal of the match against Namibia.

== Personal life ==
Gomes also holds Portuguese and Danish citizenship.

== Career statistics ==
As of match played 4 December 2021

Appearances and goals by club, season and competition
Club	Season	League			Cup		Continental		Other		Total	
Club	Season	Division	Apps	Goals	Apps	Goals	Apps	Goals	Apps	Goals	Apps	Goals
HB Køge	2012–13	1. Division	2	0	–		–		–		23	1
HB Køge	2013–14	1. Division	27	3	2	0	–		–		14	1
HB Køge	Total		29	3	2	0	–		–		31	3
Esbjerg fB	2014–15	Danish Superliga	13	1	2	0	4	0	–		19	1
Henan Jianye	2015	Chinese Super League	27	0	2	0	–		–		29	0
Henan Jianye	2016	Chinese Super League	13	2	1	0	–		–		14	2
Henan Jianye	2017	Chinese Super League	22	2	0	0	–		–		22	2
Henan Jianye	Total		62	4	3	0	–		–		65	4
FH (loan)	2018	Úrvalsdeild	15	1	2	0	4	1	–		21	2
HB Køge	2020–21	1. Division	21	1	2	0	–		–		23	1
HB Køge	2021–22	1. Division	13	1	1	0	–		–		14	1
HB Køge	Total		34	2	3	0	–		–		37	1
Career total			374	103	20	5	0	0	3	0	397	108
