= Jeppe Højbjerg =

Danish footballer (born 1995)

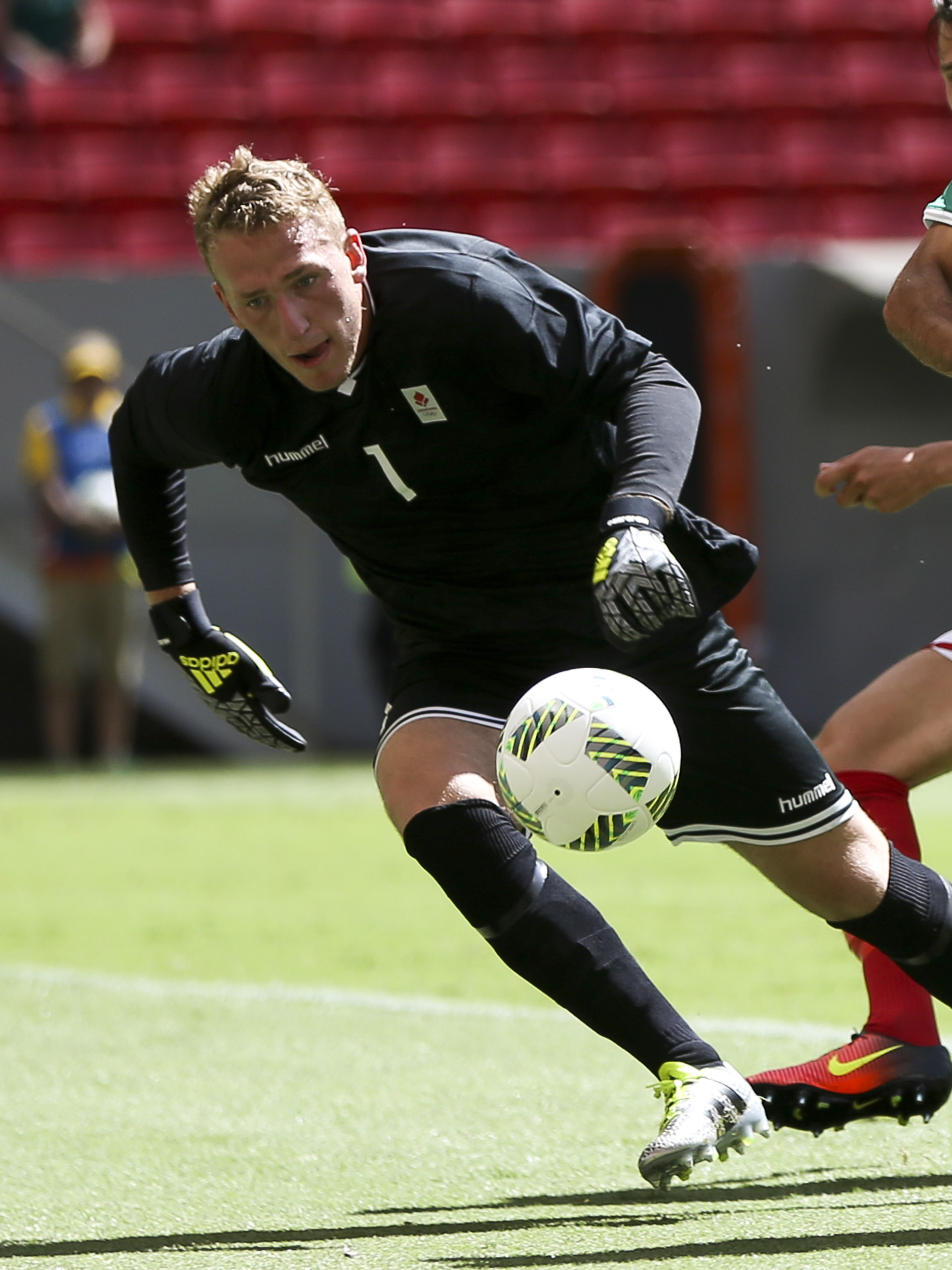
- Højbjerg in 2016

Personal information
- Date of birth: 30 April 1995 (age 31)
- Place of birth: Esbjerg, Denmark
- Height: 1.95 m (6 ft 5 in)
- Position: Goalkeeper

Youth career
- 2001–2009: Sønderris SK
- 2009–2013: Esbjerg

Senior career*
Years	Team	Apps	(Gls)
2013–2022	Esbjerg	156	(0)
2015	→ Fredericia (loan)	28	(0)
2022	Fremad Amager	5	(0)
2023	Fredericia	0	(0)

International career
2012	Denmark U17	1	(0)
2012	Denmark U18	5	(0)
2013–2014	Denmark U19	10	(0)
2014	Denmark U20	1	(0)
2015–2017	Denmark U21	23	(0)
- * Club domestic league appearances and goals as of 1 January 2024

Jeppe Højbjerg (born 30 April 1995) is a Danish professional footballer who plays as a goalkeeper.

== Club career ==
Højbjerg started his career at childhood club Sønderris SK, before moving to Esbjerg fB in 2009, where he was initially an outfield player. However, he was incidentally moved to the goalkeeper position at practice, and remained there since. In October 2012, he went on trial with English Premier League club Everton, with the club offering him a youth contract afterwards. Højbjerg, however, chose to stay at Esbjerg in order to gain first-team experience.

He made his professional debut on 26 September 2013, in a Danish Cup match, where he started in a 7–1 win over lower league side Aalborg Chang.

On 16 January 2015, Højbjerg was sent on a six-month loan to Danish 1st Division club FC Fredericia, in order to gain more first-team experience. Until then he had mainly acted as a backup goalkeeper to starter Martin Dúbravka. The loan deal was extended another six months in July 2015.

After returning from the loan spell, Højbjerg became the Esbjerg starting goalkeeper in the second half of the 2015–16 season. He made his Danish Superliga debut for the club on 28 February 2016 away against FC Copenhagen at Parken Stadium.

Since first goalkeeper Jacob Pryts Larsen and reserve goalkeeper Oliver Funch had been injured, Danish 1st Division club Fremad Amager confirmed on 15 October that they had signed a short contract with Højbjerg for the rest of 2022. Højbjerg stood without a club for 10 months, until signing a short-term deal on 29 September 2023 with his former club, FC Fredericia: a deal until the end of 2023. He left FC Fredericia at the end of 2023.

== International career ==
Højbjerg has been capped for various Danish national youth teams. In 2016, he competed in the 2016 Summer Olympics with the Denmark Olympic team, which reached the quarter-finals. He made four appearances in the Olympic tournament, conceding a total of six goals. Denmark recorded only one win, against South Africa.

On 3 September 2015, he made his first appearance for the Denmark national under-21 team in a friendly against Germany, which ended in a 2–1 defeat. He participated with the U21 team at the 2017 UEFA European Under-21 Championship. He played three matches in this tournament, conceding a total of seven goals. Denmark recorded only one win, against the Czech Republic.
