= Zeca (footballer, born 1994) =

Brazilian footballer

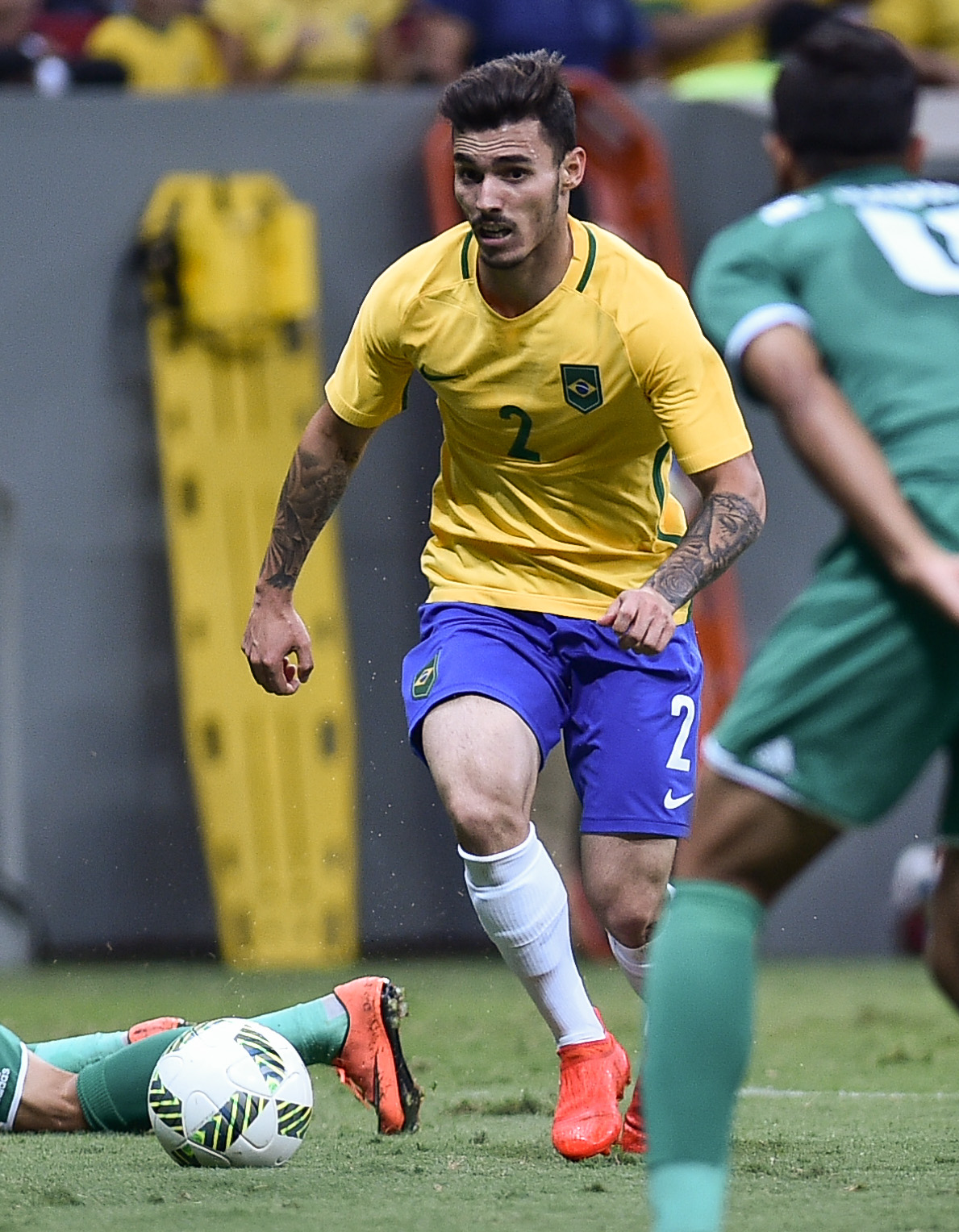
- Zeca with Brazil at the 2016 Olympics

Personal information
- Full name: José Carlos Cracco Neto
- Date of birth: 16 May 1994 (age 32)
- Place of birth: Paranavaí, Brazil
- Height: 1.70 m (5 ft 7 in)
- Position: Full-back

Team information
- Current team: Athletic (MG)

Youth career
- EF São Carlos
- 2006–2007: Santos
- 2007–2009: América-SP
- 2009–2014: Santos

Senior career*
Years	Team	Apps	(Gls)
2014–2018	Santos	115	(4)
2018–2021	Internacional	48	(0)
2020–2021	→ Bahia (loan)	11	(1)
2021	Vasco da Gama	40	(1)
2022	Houston Dynamo	20	(0)
2023–2024	Vitória	49	(1)
2024–2025	Mirassol	27	(0)
2025	Coritiba	33	(0)
2026–	Athletic (MG)	30	(0)

International career^{‡}
2015–2016	Brazil U23	9	(0)
Medal record
Olympic Games
Gold medal – first place	2016 Rio de Janeiro	Team
- * Club domestic league appearances and goals as of 18 November 2026 ‡ National team caps and goals as of 23 August 2016

José Carlos Cracco Neto (born 16 May 1994), known as Zeca, is a Brazilian professional footballer who plays as a right- or left-back for Athletic (MG). Zeca helped Brazil win a gold medal at the 2016 Summer Olympics, starting all 6 games of the tournament and playing 554 of a possible 570 minutes.

== Club career ==
=== Santos ===
Born in Paranavaí, Paraná, Zeca joined Santos' youth setup in 2006, aged 11. In 2007, Zeca joined the youth setup of América-SP. He returned to Santos in 2009 at the age of 15. On 19 February 2014 he renewed his link with Peixe until 2018.

On 9 March 2014 Zeca made his first-team debut, coming on as a late substitute for fellow youth graduate Emerson Palmieri in a 4–1 home win over Oeste in a Campeonato Paulista match. He made his Série A debut on 11 May, playing the entire second half in a 2–0 away win against Figueirense. Zeca ended his first season with the first team with 15 Série A matches, as Santos finished 9th in the table. He also made 2 appearances in the Copa do Brasil, helping Santos reach the semifinals, along with 1 appearance in the Campeonato Paulista.

At the start of the 2015 campaign, Zeca was rarely used by managers Enderson Moreira and Marcelo Fernandes, playing just 4 times across all competitions under them. He was nearly loaned to the Columbus Crew of MLS in July, but newly appointed manager Dorival Júnior convinced Zeca to stay, giving him a chance in the first team. Zeca ended the season with 22 appearances and 4 assists in Série A play, helping the Peixe finish 7th. He made 10 appearances in the Copa do Brasil as Santos reached the final, where they lost to Palmeiras 4–3 on penalties. Zeca made 3 appearances in the 2015 Campeonato Paulista to help Santos win their 21st state league title.

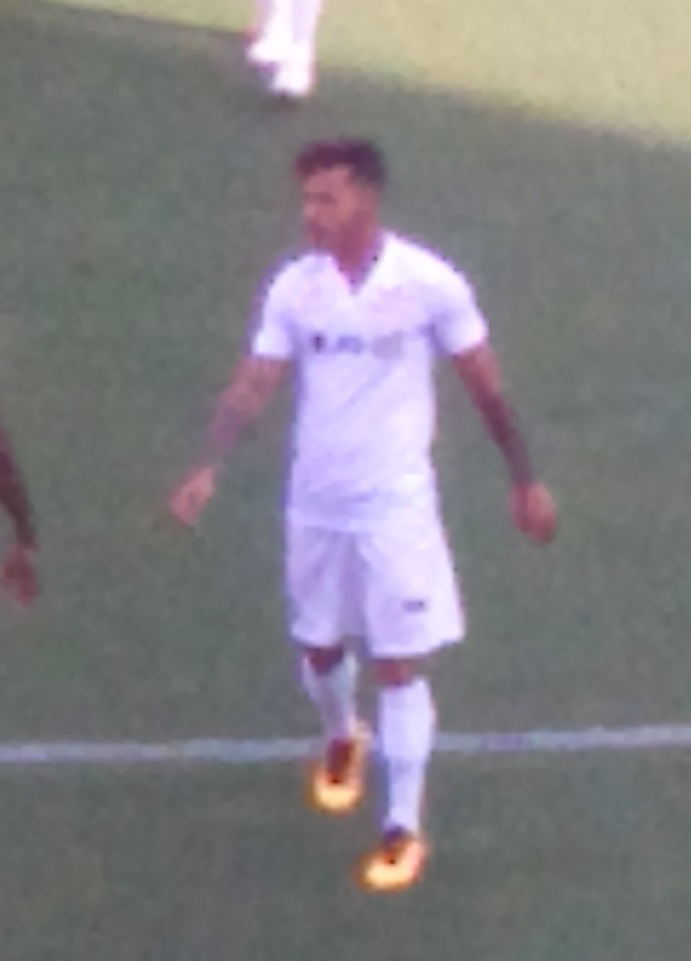
Zeca in action for Santos in 2016

On 31 March 2016 Zeca scored his first professional goal, netting his team's first in a 4–1 Paulistão home routing of Ferroviária. His first goal in the Brasileirão came on 12 June, the first of a 2–0 win at Santa Cruz. In Série A play, Zeca scored 3 goals from 31 appearances as Santos finished runners-up, 9 points off first place Palmeiras. In the 2016 Campeonato Paulista, he made 18 appearances and scored 1 goal to help the Peixe defend their title. His strong performances during the tournament saw him named to the Paulistão Team of the Year. He also made 4 Copa do Brasil appearances during the season.

On 18 November 2016, after establishing himself as an undisputed starter, Zeca extended his contract until December 2020.

He made his Copa Libertadores debut on 9 March 2017, starting in a 1–1 away draw against Sporting Cristal. In April Zeca had surgery on his left meniscus, causing him to miss over a month. On 28 May, in his 3rd game back from injury, he was subbed off early in the second half of a 1–0 loss to Cruzeiro due to swelling in his left knee and pain in his left calf. On 3 August he returned after missing 2 months, coming on as a substitute in a 3–2 win over Flamengo. Zeca ended the 2017 season with 14 appearances and 1 assist in Brasileirão play to help Santos finish 3rd. He made 11 appearances in the Campeonato Paulista and 6 in Copa Libertadores, helping the Peixe reach the quarterfinals in both competitions.

On 26 October 2017, after altercations with Santos supporters at São Paulo–Congonhas Airport and threatening graffiti was painted on the walls of the Vila Belmiro, Zeca took a legal action against Santos by alleging a delay of payments. He would not make another appearance for Santos during the 2017 season. Despite being granted the right to represent another club on 1 December, Santos appealed to stop the departure of the player on a free transfer.

=== Internacional ===
On 23 April 2018, Zeca signed with Sport Club Internacional as part of a swap deal that saw Eduardo Sasha's loan to Santos made permanent. Zeca signed a contract with Internacional until 30 June 2022, with Santos maintaining 50% of his rights and Internacional keeping 50% of Sasha's rights. On 12 May, Zeca made his Internacional debut, starting as a central midfielder in a 0–0 draw against bitter rivals Grêmio. During his first season in Porto Alegre, Zeca made 19 appearances and had 1 assist to help Internacional finish 3rd in the Série A table.

During the 2019 season, Zeca played in 20 Série A matches as Internacional finished 7th in the standings. In the Campeonato Gaúcho, he made 9 appearances to help Inter reach the final, where they fell to Grêmio in a penalty shoot-out. In the Copa Libertadores, Zeca made 6 appearances as Inter reached the quarterfinals. He appeared in 2 of Internacional's Copa do Brasil matches, helping them reach the final, where they lost to Athletico Paranaense 3–1 on aggregate.

==== Loan to Bahia ====
On 15 January 2020, Zeca was loaned to Série A club Bahia for the 2020 season as part of a deal that saw fellow full-back Moisés go on loan in the opposite direction. He made his Bahia debut on 19 February, coming off the bench in a 2–0 win over CSA in a Copa do Nordeste match. On 16 November he scored his first goal for Bahia to give Tricolor a 2–1 win against Coritiba in a Série A match. Zeca ended the season with 1 goal from 11 Série A matches as Bahia finished 14th in the table. In the Campeonato Baiano, Zeca made 5 appearances to help Bahia reach the final, where they won their 49th state league title after defeating Alagoinhas Atlético Clube on penalties. He made 2 appearances in the Copa do Nordeste as Tricolor reached the final, where they lost to Ceará 4–1 on aggregate.

On 9 March 2021, Zeca reached an agreement with Internacional to have his contract terminated.

=== Vasco da Gama ===
On 9 March 2021, Zeca signed with Série B side Vasco da Gama on a contract running through the 2021 season plus a team option for 2022 Zeca made his Vasco debut on 18 March, playing the full match in a 1–1 draw against Caldense in a Copa do Brasil match. He scored his first goal for the club on 27 March in a 2–2 draw with Madureira in a Campeonato Carioca match. Zeca made 29 appearances and had 3 assists in Série B play as Vasco finished 10th. He made 11 appearances, scored 1 goal, and had 1 assist in the Campeonato Carioca, helping Vasco win the Taça Rio. He also made 6 appearances in the Copa da Brasil as Vasco da Gama reached the round of 16.

On 6 December 2021, Vasco da Gama declined Zeca's contract option for 2022.

=== Houston Dynamo ===
On 10 February 2022, Zeca signed with Major League Soccer club Houston Dynamo. He made his Dynamo debut on 5 March, coming off the bench in a 1–0 loss at Sporting Kansas City. He ended the regular season with 20 appearances, 12 starts, and 1 assist as the Dynamo finished 13th in the Western Conference, missing out on the playoffs. He also made an appearance in the Open Cup. Following the season, Houston declined Zeca's contract option.

==== Match fixing investigation ====
On 10 May 2023, a Public Ministry of Goiás spreadsheet and text messages obtained by O Globo suggested that Colorado Rapids player Max Alves had connected Zeca with an organization in 2022 that would later be investigated in the 2023 Brazilian football match-fixing scandal by prosecutors in Goiás state, Brazil. According to the O Globo report, on 8 October 2022 Zeca was supposed to take part in match fixing in a Dynamo match against LA Galaxy for the organization. Zeca did not play in the match, and was not named in the official Goiás investigation.

=== Vitória ===
On 20 January 2023, Zeca signed with Série B side Esporte Clube Vitória. He made his debut for Vitória on 21 January, scoring a goal in a 1–1 draw against Santa Cruz in a Copa do Nordeste match.

== International career ==
On 29 June 2016, Zeca was named to the 18 player squad for the 2016 Olympics by manager Rogério Micale. On 20 August, Zeca played 120 minutes in the gold medal match as Brazil beat Germany 5–4 on penalties. He started all 6 games of the tournament and played 554 of a possible 570 minutes.

== Career statistics ==
As of 7 November 2023

Appearances and goals by club, season and competition
Club	Season	League			State League (Note: Includes Campeonato Paulista, Campeonato Gaúcho, Campeonato Baiano, and Campeonato Carioca)		Cup (Note: Includes Copa do Brasil and U.S. Open Cup)		Continental		Other		Total	
Club	Season	Division	Apps	Goals	Apps	Goals	Apps	Goals	Apps	Goals	Apps	Goals	Apps	Goals
Santos	2014	Série A	15	0	1	0	2	0	—		—		18	0
Santos	2015	Série A	22	0	3	0	10	0	—		—		35	0
Santos	2016	Série A	31	3	18	1	4	0	—		—		53	4
Santos	2017	Série A	14	0	11	0	0	0	6 (Note: Appearance(s) in Copa Libertadores)	0	—		31	0
Santos	Total		82	3	33	1	16	0	6	0	—		137	4
Internacional	2018	Série A	19	0	0	0	0	0	—		—		19	0
Internacional	2019	Série A	20	0	9	0	2	0	6	0	—		37	0
Internacional	total		39	0	9	0	2	0	6	0	—		56	0
Bahia (loan)	2020	Série A	11	1	5	0	0	0	1 (Note: Appearance(s) in Copa Sudamericana)	0	2 (Note: Appearance(s) in Copa do Nordeste)	0	19	1
Vasco da Gama	2021	Série B	29	0	11	1	6	0	—		—		46	1
Houston Dynamo	2022	MLS	20	0	—		1	0	—		—		21	0
Vitória	2023	Série B	24	1	6	0	0	0	—		7	1	37	2
Career total			205	5	64	2	25	0	13	0	9	1	316	8

== Honours ==
Santos

- Campeonato Paulista: 2015, 2016
- Copa São Paulo de Futebol Júnior: 2013, 2014
- Copa do Brasil Sub-20: 2013

Bahia

- Campeonato Baiano: 2020

Vasco da Gama

- Taça Rio: 2021

Brazil U23

- Olympic Gold Medal: 2016

Individual

- Campeonato Paulista Team of the Year: 2016
- Troféu Mesa Redonda Best Left-back in Brazil: 2016
