= Football at the 2016 Summer Olympics – Men's tournament – Group D =

Group D of the men's football tournament at the 2016 Summer Olympics was played from 4 to 10 August 2016, and included Algeria, Argentina, Honduras and Portugal. The top two teams advanced to the knockout stage.

All times are BRT (UTC−3).

== Teams ==
Draw position	Team	Confederation	Method of qualification	Date of qualification	Olympic appearance	Last appearance	Previous best performance
D1	Honduras	CONCACAF	CONCACAF Qualifying 2nd place	10 October 2015	4th	2012	Quarter-finals (2012)
D2	Algeria	CAF	Africa U-23 Cup of Nations 2nd place	9 December 2015	2nd	1980	Quarter-finals (1980)
D3	Portugal	UEFA	UEFA Under-21 Championship 2nd place	24 June 2015	4th	2004	Fourth place (1996)
D4	Argentina	CONMEBOL	South American Youth Championship 1st place	7 February 2015	8th	2008	Gold medal (2004, 2008)

== Standings ==
Pos	Team	Pld	W	D	L	GF	GA	GD	Pts	Qualification
1	Portugal	3	2	1	0	5	2	+3	7	Quarter-finals
2	Honduras	3	1	1	1	5	5	0	4	Quarter-finals
3	Argentina	3	1	1	1	3	4	−1	4	
4	Algeria	3	0	1	2	4	6	−2	1	

Source: Rio2016 & FIFA
Rules for classification: Tiebreakers

== Matches ==
=== Honduras vs Algeria ===
4 August 2016
15:00

Honduras	3–2	Algeria
Quioto 13'; Pereira 33'; Lozano 79'	Report (Rio2016); Report (FIFA)	Bendebka 68'; Bounedjah 85'

Estádio Olímpico João Havelange, Rio de Janeiro
Attendance: 20,000
Referee: Sandro Ricci (Brazil)

Honduras	Algeria

GK	1	Luis López
DF	3	Marcelo Pereira
DF	4	Kevin Álvarez
DF	5	Allans Vargas
DF	8	Johnny Palacios	(yellow card) 88'
DF	16	Brayan García
MF	6	Bryan Acosta (c)		(substituted off) 86'
MF	15	Allan Banegas		(substituted off) 78'
FW	9	Anthony Lozano
FW	12	Romell Quioto
FW	17	Alberth Elis		(substituted off) 67'
Substitutions:
MF	13	Jhow Benavídez		(substituted on) 67'
MF	11	Marcelo Espinal		(substituted on) 78'
DF	2	Jonathan Paz		(substituted on) 86'
Manager:
Jorge Luis Pinto

GK	16	Farid Chaâl
DF	4	Abdelghani Demmou
DF	5	Ryad Kenniche (c)		(substituted off) 30'
DF	15	Houari Ferhani
MF	8	Haris Belkebla	(yellow card) 90+1'
MF	12	Raouf Benguit
MF	14	Sofiane Bendebka
FW	7	Baghdad Bounedjah	(yellow card) 58'
FW	9	Mohamed Benkablia		(substituted off) 60'
FW	11	Zakaria Haddouche
FW	18	Rachid Aït-Atmane		(substituted off) 71'
Substitutions:
DF	3	Ayoub Abdellaoui		(substituted on) 30'
FW	10	Abderrahmane Meziane	(yellow card) 76'	(substituted on) 60'
FW	13	Oussama Darfalou		(substituted on) 71'
Manager:
Pierre-André Schürmann

Assistant referees:
Emerson de Carvalho (Brazil)
Marcelo Van Gasse (Brazil)
Fourth official:
Ryuji Sato (Japan)

=== Portugal vs Argentina ===
4 August 2016
18:00

Portugal	2–0	Argentina
Paciência 66'; Pité 84'	Report (Rio2016); Report (FIFA)

Estádio Olímpico João Havelange, Rio de Janeiro
Attendance: 37,407
Referee: Walter López Castellanos (Guatemala)

Portugal	Argentina

GK	1	Bruno Varela
DF	2	Ricardo Esgaio (c)
DF	4	Tobias Figueiredo	(yellow card) 33'
DF	5	Edgar Ié
MF	6	Tomás Podstawski
MF	7	André Martins		(substituted off) 76'
MF	8	Sérgio Oliveira	(yellow card) 70'	(substituted off) 71'
MF	10	Bruno Fernandes
MF	15	Fernando Fonseca
FW	9	Gonçalo Paciência		(substituted off) 81'
FW	11	Salvador Agra
Substitutions:
FW	13	Pité		(substituted on) 71'
MF	18	Tiago Silva		(substituted on) 76'
DF	3	Tiago Ilori		(substituted on) 81'
Manager:
Rui Jorge

GK	1	Gerónimo Rulli
DF	2	Lautaro Gianetti	(yellow card) 2'
DF	3	Alexis Soto
DF	4	José Luis Gómez
DF	6	Víctor Cuesta (c)
DF	15	Lisandro Magallán	(yellow card) 56'	(substituted off) 64'
MF	8	Santiago Ascacibar
MF	17	Mauricio Martínez
FW	9	Jonathan Calleri
FW	10	Ángel Correa		(substituted off) 79'
FW	18	Cristian Espinoza		(substituted off) 72'
Substitutions:
MF	7	Cristian Pavón		(substituted on) 64'
MF	14	Giovani Lo Celso		(substituted on) 72'
FW	11	Giovanni Simeone		(substituted on) 79'
Manager:
Julio Olarticoechea

Assistant referees:
Leonel Leal (Costa Rica)
Gerson López Castellanos (Guatemala)
Fourth official:
Matthew Conger (New Zealand)

=== Honduras vs Portugal ===
7 August 2016
15:00

Honduras	1–2	Portugal
Elis 1'	Report (Rio2016); Report (FIFA)	Figueiredo 21'; Paciência 36'

Estádio Olímpico João Havelange, Rio de Janeiro
Attendance: 32,928
Referee: Roddy Zambrano (Ecuador)

Honduras	Portugal

GK	1	Luis López
DF	3	Marcelo Pereira
DF	5	Allans Vargas
DF	8	Johnny Palacios	(yellow card) 47'
DF	16	Brayan García
MF	6	Bryan Acosta (c)
MF	7	Brayan Ramírez	(yellow card) 40'	(substituted off) 46'
MF	15	Allan Banegas		(substituted off) 69'
FW	9	Anthony Lozano
FW	12	Romell Quioto
FW	17	Alberth Elis
Substitutions:
MF	10	Óscar Salas		(substituted on) 46'
MF	13	Jhow Benavídez		(substituted on) 69'
Manager:
Jorge Luis Pinto

GK	1	Bruno Varela
DF	2	Ricardo Esgaio (c)
DF	4	Tobias Figueiredo	(yellow card) 42'
DF	5	Edgar Ié
MF	6	Tomás Podstawski
MF	7	André Martins
MF	8	Sérgio Oliveira	(yellow card) 9'	(substituted off) 74'
MF	10	Bruno Fernandes
MF	15	Fernando Fonseca
FW	9	Gonçalo Paciência		(substituted off) 70'
FW	11	Salvador Agra		(substituted off) 59'
Substitutions:
FW	17	Carlos Mané		(substituted on) 59'
FW	13	Pité		(substituted on) 70'
MF	16	Francisco Ramos		(substituted on) 74'
Manager:
Rui Jorge

Assistant referees:
Christian Lescano (Ecuador)
Byron Romero (Ecuador)
Fourth official:
César Ramos (Mexico)

=== Argentina vs Algeria ===
7 August 2016
18:00

Argentina	2–1	Algeria
Correa 47'; Calleri 70'	Report (Rio2016); Report (FIFA)	Bendebka 64'

Estádio Olímpico João Havelange, Rio de Janeiro
Attendance: 37,450
Referee: Cüneyt Çakır (Turkey)

Argentina	Algeria

GK	1	Gerónimo Rulli
DF	2	Lautaro Gianetti
DF	3	Alexis Soto
DF	4	José Luis Gómez
DF	6	Víctor Cuesta (c)	(yellow card) 38' (yellow-red card) 45+3'
MF	7	Cristian Pavón		(substituted off) 87'
MF	8	Santiago Ascacibar
MF	14	Giovani Lo Celso		(substituted off) 73'
MF	17	Mauricio Martínez
FW	9	Jonathan Calleri
FW	10	Ángel Correa	(yellow card) 26'	(substituted off) 83'
Substitutions:
MF	5	Lucas Romero		(substituted on) 73'
FW	11	Giovanni Simeone		(substituted on) 83'
FW	18	Cristian Espinoza		(substituted on) 87'
Manager:
Julio Olarticoechea

GK	16	Farid Chaâl
DF	3	Ayoub Abdellaoui	(yellow card) 48' (yellow-red card) 67'
DF	4	Abdelghani Demmou (c)	(yellow card) 53'
DF	15	Houari Ferhani
MF	8	Haris Belkebla	(yellow card) 38'
MF	12	Raouf Benguit
MF	14	Sofiane Bendebka
FW	7	Baghdad Bounedjah
FW	9	Mohamed Benkablia	(yellow card) 45'	(substituted off) 81'
FW	11	Zakaria Haddouche	(yellow card) 39'	(substituted off) 55'
FW	18	Rachid Aït-Atmane		(substituted off) 36'
Substitutions:
MF	6	Mohamed Benkhemassa	(yellow card) 90+3'	(substituted on) 36'
FW	10	Abderrahmane Meziane		(substituted on) 55'
FW	13	Oussama Darfalou		(substituted on) 81'
Manager:
Pierre-André Schürmann

Assistant referees:
Bahattin Duran (Turkey)
Tarık Ongun (Turkey)
Fourth official:
Clément Turpin (France)

=== Argentina vs Honduras ===
10 August 2016
13:00

Argentina	1–1	Honduras
Martínez 90+3'	Report (Rio2016); Report (FIFA)	Lozano 75' (pen.)

Estádio Nacional Mané Garrincha, Brasília
Attendance: 16,029
Referee: Antonio Mateu Lahoz (Spain)

Argentina	Honduras

GK	1	Gerónimo Rulli (c)	(yellow card) 45+4'
DF	2	Lautaro Gianetti	(yellow card) 72'
DF	3	Alexis Soto		(substituted off) 81'
DF	4	José Luis Gómez
DF	16	Leandro Vega	(yellow card) 23'
MF	7	Cristian Pavón
MF	8	Santiago Ascacibar	(yellow card) 45+2'
MF	14	Giovani Lo Celso		(substituted off) 70'
MF	17	Mauricio Martínez
FW	9	Jonathan Calleri
FW	10	Ángel Correa	(yellow card) 45+2'
Substitutions:
FW	11	Giovanni Simeone		(substituted on) 70'
FW	18	Cristian Espinoza		(substituted on) 81'
Manager:
Julio Olarticoechea

GK	1	Luis López
DF	2	Jonathan Paz	(yellow card) 27'
DF	3	Marcelo Pereira	(yellow card) 54'
DF	5	Allans Vargas
DF	16	Brayan García
MF	6	Bryan Acosta (c)	(yellow card) 16'
MF	7	Brayan Ramírez		(substituted off) 87'
MF	15	Allan Banegas		(substituted off) 62'
FW	9	Anthony Lozano	(yellow card) 85'
FW	12	Romell Quioto		(substituted off) 81'
FW	17	Alberth Elis
Substitutions:
MF	11	Marcelo Espinal		(substituted on) 62'
MF	13	Jhow Benavídez		(substituted on) 81'
DF	4	Kevin Álvarez		(substituted on) 87'
Manager:
Jorge Luis Pinto

Assistant referees:
Pau Cebrián Devis (Spain)
Roberto Díaz Pérez (Spain)
Fourth official:
Ovidiu Hațegan (Romania)

=== Algeria vs Portugal ===
10 August 2016
13:00

Algeria	1–1	Portugal
Benkablia 30'	Report (Rio2016); Report (FIFA)	Paciência 25' (pen.)

Mineirão, Belo Horizonte
Attendance: 13,787
Referee: Matthew Conger (New Zealand)

Algeria	Portugal

GK	22	Oussama Methazem	(yellow card) 23'
DF	2	Miloud Rebiaï
DF	15	Houari Ferhani
MF	6	Mohamed Benkhemassa	(yellow card) 35'
MF	12	Raouf Benguit
MF	14	Sofiane Bendebka (c)
MF	17	Zakaria Draoui
FW	7	Baghdad Bounedjah
FW	9	Mohamed Benkablia		(substituted off) 84'
FW	10	Abderrahmane Meziane
FW	13	Oussama Darfalou
Substitutions:
FW	11	Zakaria Haddouche		(substituted on) 84'
Manager:
Pierre-André Schürmann

GK	1	Bruno Varela
DF	2	Ricardo Esgaio (c)	(yellow card) 18'	(substituted off) 46'
DF	3	Tiago Ilori
DF	5	Edgar Ié
DF	14	Paulo Henrique
MF	6	Tomás Podstawski		(substituted off) 71'
MF	16	Francisco Ramos	(yellow card) 58'
MF	18	Tiago Silva
FW	9	Gonçalo Paciência		(substituted off) 61'
FW	13	Pité
FW	17	Carlos Mané
Substitutions:
MF	15	Fernando Fonseca		(substituted on) 46'
FW	11	Salvador Agra		(substituted on) 61'
MF	7	André Martins		(substituted on) 71'
Manager:
Rui Jorge

Assistant referees:
Simon Lount (New Zealand)
Tevita Makasini (Tonga)
Fourth official:
Diego Haro (Peru)
