= Football at the 2016 Summer Olympics – Men's team squads =

The following is a list of squads for each nation that competed in men's football at the 2016 Summer Olympics in Rio de Janeiro. Each nation had to submit a squad of eighteen players, at least fifteen of whom had to be born on or after 1 January 1993, and three of whom could be older dispensation players. A minimum of two goalkeepers (plus one optional dispensation goalkeeper) had to be included in the squad.

Age, caps and goals as of the start of the tournament, 4 August 2016.

== Group A ==
=== Brazil ===
The following was the Brazil squad in the men's football tournament of the 2016 Summer Olympics. The team of 18 players was officially named on 29 June and confirmed on 14 July. On 31 July, Fernando Prass left the squad due to an elbow injury and was replaced by Weverton.

Head coach: Rogério Micale

No.	Pos.	Player	Date of birth (age)	Caps	Goals	Club
1	GK	Weverton*	13 December 1987 (aged 28)	0	0	(Brazilian Football Confederation) Atlético Paranaense
2	DF	Zeca	16 May 1994 (aged 22)	6	0	(Brazilian Football Confederation) Santos
3	DF	Rodrigo Caio	17 August 1993 (aged 22)	6	0	(Brazilian Football Confederation) São Paulo
4	DF	Marquinhos	14 May 1994 (aged 22)	0	2	(French Football Federation) Paris Saint-Germain
5	MF	Renato Augusto*	8 February 1988 (aged 28)	0	1	(Chinese Football Association) Beijing Guoan
6	DF	Douglas Santos	22 March 1994 (aged 22)	4	0	(Brazilian Football Confederation) Atlético Mineiro
7	FW	Luan Vieira	27 March 1993 (aged 23)	4	4	(Brazilian Football Confederation) Grêmio
8	MF	Rafinha	12 February 1993 (aged 23)	5	1	(Royal Spanish Football Federation) Barcelona
9	FW	Gabriel Barbosa	30 August 1996 (aged 19)	5	2	(Brazilian Football Confederation) Santos
10	FW	Neymar* (c)	5 February 1992 (aged 24)	7	5	(Royal Spanish Football Federation) Barcelona
11	FW	Gabriel Jesus	3 April 1997 (aged 19)	6	3	(Brazilian Football Confederation) Palmeiras
12	MF	Walace	4 April 1995 (aged 21)	0	0	(Brazilian Football Confederation) Grêmio
13	DF	William	3 April 1995 (aged 21)	0	0	(Brazilian Football Confederation) Internacional
14	DF	Luan Garcia	10 May 1993 (aged 23)	5	0	(Brazilian Football Confederation) Vasco da Gama
15	MF	Rodrigo Dourado	17 June 1994 (aged 22)	1	0	(Brazilian Football Confederation) Internacional
16	MF	Thiago Maia	23 March 1997 (aged 19)	2	0	(Brazilian Football Confederation) Santos
17	FW	Felipe Anderson	15 April 1993 (aged 23)	7	0	(Italian Football Federation) Lazio
18	GK	Uilson	28 April 1994 (aged 22)	0	0	(Brazilian Football Confederation) Atlético Mineiro

* Over-aged player.

Douglas Costa was originally considered for the squad, but due to injury and his club Bayern Munich's refusal to release him, he was replaced by Renato Augusto. Fred, from Shakhtar Donetsk, was also considered for the squad, but his club did not release him for the tournament, and he was replaced by Walace.

=== Denmark ===
The following is the Danish final squad in the men's football tournament of the 2016 Summer Olympics. Yussuf Poulsen, Uffe Bech and Lasse Vigen Christensen left the squad due to several reasons and were replaced by Jacob Bruun Larsen, Jacob Barrett Laursen and Mathias Hebo.

Head coach: Niels Frederiksen

No.	Pos.	Player	Date of birth (age)	Caps	Goals	2016 club
1	GK	Jeppe Højbjerg	30 April 1995 (aged 21)	0	0	(Danish Football Association) Esbjerg
2	DF	Mikkel Desler	19 February 1995 (aged 21)	0	0	(Danish Football Association) OB
3	DF	Kasper Larsen	25 January 1993 (aged 23)	0	0	(Royal Dutch Football Association) Groningen
4	DF	Edigeison Gomes*	17 November 1988 (aged 27)	0	0	(Chinese Football Association) Henan Jianye
5	DF	Jakob Blåbjerg	11 January 1995 (aged 21)	0	0	(Danish Football Association) AaB
6	MF	Andreas Maxsø	18 March 1994 (aged 22)	0	0	(Danish Football Association) Nordsjælland
7	FW	Lasse Vibe* (c)	22 July 1987 (aged 29)	0	0	(The Football Association) Brentford
8	MF	Mathias Hebo	2 August 1995 (aged 21)	0	0	(Danish Football Association) Fredericia
9	FW	Nicolai Brock-Madsen	9 January 1993 (aged 23)	0	0	(The Football Association) Birmingham City
10	FW	Jacob Bruun Larsen	19 September 1998 (aged 17)	0	0	(German Football Association) Borussia Dortmund
11	DF	Jacob Barrett Laursen	17 November 1994 (aged 21)	0	0	(Danish Football Association) OB
12	FW	Frederik Børsting	13 February 1995 (aged 21)	0	0	(Danish Football Association) AaB
13	FW	Emil Larsen*	22 June 1991 (aged 25)	0	0	(Danish Football Association) Lyngby
14	MF	Casper Nielsen	29 April 1994 (aged 22)	0	0	(Danish Football Association) Esbjerg
15	DF	Pascal Gregor	18 February 1994 (aged 22)	0	0	(Danish Football Association) Nordsjælland
16	FW	Robert Skov	20 May 1996 (aged 20)	0	0	(Danish Football Association) Silkeborg
17	MF	Jens Jønsson	10 January 1993 (aged 23)	0	0	(Danish Football Association) AGF
18	GK	Lukas Fernandes	1 March 1993 (aged 23)	0	0	(Danish Football Association) Sønderjyske

* Over-aged player.

=== Iraq ===
The following is the Iraq squad in the men's football tournament of the 2016 Summer Olympics. The team of 18 players was officially named on 14 July.

Head coach: Abdul-Ghani Shahad

No.	Pos.	Player	Date of birth (age)	Caps	Goals	Club
1	GK	Fahad Talib	21 October 1994 (aged 21)	9	0	(Iraq Football Association) Al-Quwa Al-Jawiya
2	DF	Ahmed Ibrahim Khalaf*	25 February 1992 (aged 24)	6	0	(United Arab Emirates Football Association) Al-Dhafra
3	DF	Hawbir Mustafa	24 September 1993 (aged 22)	0	0	(Royal Dutch Football Association) MVV Maastricht
4	DF	Mustafa Nadhim	23 September 1993 (aged 22)	28	4	(Iraq Football Association) Naft Al-Wasat
5	DF	Ali Faez	9 September 1994 (aged 21)	9	1	(Turkish Football Federation) Çaykur Rizespor
6	DF	Ali Adnan Kadhim	19 December 1993 (aged 22)	10	5	(Italian Football Federation) Udinese
7	FW	Hammadi Ahmed*	18 October 1989 (aged 26)	0	0	(Iraq Football Association) Al-Quwa Al-Jawiya
8	FW	Mohannad Abdul-Raheem	22 September 1993 (aged 22)	15	5	(Iraq Football Association) Al-Zawraa
9	MF	Mahdi Kamil	6 January 1995 (aged 21)	26	6	(Iraq Football Association) Al-Shorta
10	MF	Ali Husni	23 May 1994 (aged 22)	9	3	(Turkish Football Federation) Çaykur Rizespor
11	MF	Humam Tariq	10 February 1996 (aged 20)	12	5	(Iraq Football Association) Al-Quwa Al-Jawiya
12	GK	Mohammed Hameed Farhan	24 January 1993 (aged 23)	7	0	(Iraq Football Association) Naft Al-Wasat
13	FW	Sherko Karim	25 May 1996 (aged 20)	0	0	(Swiss Football Association) Grasshopper
14	DF	Saad Natiq	19 March 1994 (aged 22)	11	1	(Iraq Football Association) Al-Quwa Al-Jawiya
15	DF	Dhurgham Ismail	23 May 1994 (aged 22)	12	1	(Turkish Football Federation) Çaykur Rizespor
16	MF	Saad Abdul-Amir* (c)	19 January 1992 (aged 24)	4	0	(Saudi Arabian Football Federation) Al-Qadisiyah
17	DF	Alaa Mhawi	3 June 1996 (aged 20)	5	0	(Iraq Football Association) Al-Zawraa
18	MF	Amjad Attwan	12 March 1997 (aged 19)	5	2	(Iraq Football Association) Al-Shorta

* Over-aged player.

=== South Africa ===
The following is the South Africa squad in the men's football tournament of the 2016 Summer Olympics. The team of 18 players was officially named on 14 July.

Head coach: Owen Da Gama

No.	Pos.	Player	Date of birth (age)	Caps	Goals	Club
1	GK	Jody February	12 May 1996 (aged 20)	0	0	(South African Football Association) Ajax Cape Town
2	DF	Eric Mathoho*	1 March 1990 (aged 26)	0	0	(South African Football Association) Kaizer Chiefs
3	DF	Repo Malepe	18 February 1997 (aged 19)	0	0	(South African Football Association) Orlando Pirates
4	FW	Mothobi Mvala	14 June 1994 (aged 22)	0	0	(South African Football Association) Highlands Park
5	DF	Rivaldo Coetzee	16 October 1996 (aged 19)	0	0	(South African Football Association) Ajax Cape Town
6	DF	Kwanda Mngonyama	25 September 1993 (aged 22)	0	0	(South African Football Association) Maritzburg United
7	MF	Menzi Masuku	15 April 1993 (aged 23)	0	0	(South African Football Association) Orlando Pirates
8	MF	Tyroane Sandows	12 February 1995 (aged 21)	0	0	(Brazilian Football Confederation) Grêmio
9	FW	Tashreeq Morris	13 May 1994 (aged 22)	0	0	(South African Football Association) Ajax Cape Town
10	FW	Keagan Dolly (c)	22 January 1993 (aged 23)	0	0	(South African Football Association) Mamelodi Sundowns
11	MF	Maphosa Modiba	22 July 1995 (aged 21)	0	0	(South African Football Association) Mpumalanga Black Aces
12	FW	Lebo Mothiba	28 January 1996 (aged 20)	0	0	(French Football Federation) Lille
13	DF	Abbubaker Mobara	18 February 1994 (aged 22)	0	0	(South African Football Association) Orlando Pirates
14	MF	Gift Motupa	23 September 1994 (aged 21)	0	0	(South African Football Association) Orlando Pirates
15	MF	Phumlani Ntshangase	24 December 1994 (aged 21)	0	0	(South African Football Association) Bidvest Wits
16	GK	Itumeleng Khune*	20 June 1987 (aged 29)	0	0	(South African Football Association) Kaizer Chiefs
17	DF	Tebogo Moerane	7 April 1995 (aged 21)	0	0	(South African Football Association) Bidvest Wits
18	MF	Deolin Mekoa	10 August 1993 (aged 22)	0	0	(South African Football Association) Maritzburg United
19	FW	Andile Fikizolo	13 May 1994 (aged 22)	0	0	(South African Football Association) Lamontville Golden Arrows
21	FW	Thabiso Kutumela	3 July 1993 (aged 23)	0	0	(South African Football Association) Baroka

* Over-aged player.

== Group B ==
=== Colombia ===
The following is the Colombia squad in the men's football tournament of the 2016 Summer Olympics. The team of 18 players was officially named on 14 July. Andrés Rentería withdrew due to injury and was replaced by Arley Rodríguez.

Head coach: Carlos Restrepo

No.	Pos.	Player	Date of birth (age)	Caps	Goals	Club
1	GK	Cristian Bonilla	2 June 1993 (aged 23)	4	0	(Colombian Football Federation) Atlético Nacional
2	DF	William Tesillo*	2 February 1990 (aged 26)	2	0	(Colombian Football Federation) Santa Fe
3	DF	Deivy Balanta	9 February 1993 (aged 23)	4	0	(Colombian Football Federation) Junior
4	DF	Deiver Machado	2 September 1993 (aged 22)	3	0	(Colombian Football Federation) Millonarios
5	DF	Felipe Aguilar	20 January 1993 (aged 23)	2	0	(Colombian Football Federation) Atlético Nacional
6	MF	Jefferson Lerma	25 October 1994 (aged 21)	2	0	(Royal Spanish Football Federation) Levante
7	FW	Arley Rodríguez	9 February 1993 (aged 23)	4	0	(Colombian Football Federation) Atlético Nacional
8	FW	Dorlan Pabón*	24 January 1988 (aged 28)	2	0	(Mexican Football Federation) Monterrey
9	FW	Miguel Borja	26 January 1993 (aged 23)	2	0	(Colombian Football Federation) Atlético Nacional
10	FW	Teófilo Gutiérrez* (c)	17 May 1985 (aged 31)	2	1	(Portuguese Football Federation) Sporting CP
11	FW	Harold Preciado	1 June 1994 (aged 22)	4	1	(Colombian Football Federation) Deportivo Cali
12	MF	Andrés Felipe Roa	25 May 1993 (aged 23)	4	0	(Colombian Football Federation) Deportivo Cali
13	DF	Helibelton Palacios	11 June 1993 (aged 23)	4	0	(Colombian Football Federation) Deportivo Cali
14	MF	Sebastián Pérez	29 March 1993 (aged 23)	3	0	(Colombian Football Federation) Atlético Nacional
15	MF	Wilmar Barrios	16 October 1993 (aged 22)	5	0	(Colombian Football Federation) Deportes Tolima
16	MF	Kevin Balanta	28 April 1997 (aged 19)	4	0	(Colombian Football Federation) Deportivo Cali
17	DF	Cristian Borja	18 February 1993 (aged 23)	7	0	(Colombian Football Federation) Santa Fe
18	GK	Luis Hurtado	24 January 1994 (aged 22)	2	0	(Colombian Football Federation) Deportivo Cali
19	DF	Juan Sebastián Quintero	23 March 1995 (aged 21)	0	0	(Colombian Football Federation) Deportivo Cali

* Over-aged player.

=== Japan ===
The following is the Japan squad in the men's football tournament of the 2016 Summer Olympics. The team of 18 players was officially named on 1 July.

Head coach: Makoto Teguramori

No.	Pos.	Player	Date of birth (age)	Caps	Goals	Club
1	GK	Masatoshi Kushibiki	29 January 1993 (aged 23)	0	0	(Japan Football Association) Kashima Antlers
2	DF	Sei Muroya	5 April 1994 (aged 22)	0	0	(Japan Football Association) FC Tokyo
3	MF	Wataru Endo (c)	9 February 1993 (aged 23)	0	0	(Japan Football Association) Urawa Red Diamonds
4	DF	Hiroki Fujiharu*	28 November 1988 (aged 27)	0	0	(Japan Football Association) Gamba Osaka
5	DF	Naomichi Ueda	24 October 1994 (aged 21)	0	0	(Japan Football Association) Kashima Antlers
6	DF	Tsukasa Shiotani*	5 December 1988 (aged 27)	0	0	(Japan Football Association) Sanfrecce Hiroshima
7	MF	Riki Harakawa	13 August 1993 (aged 22)	0	0	(Japan Football Association) Kawasaki Frontale
8	MF	Ryota Oshima	23 January 1993 (aged 23)	0	0	(Japan Football Association) Kawasaki Frontale
9	MF	Shinya Yajima	18 January 1994 (aged 22)	0	0	(Japan Football Association) Fagiano Okayama
10	MF	Shoya Nakajima	23 August 1994 (aged 21)	0	0	(Japan Football Association) FC Tokyo
11	FW	Musashi Suzuki	11 February 1994 (aged 22)	0	0	(Japan Football Association) Albirex Niigata
12	GK	Kosuke Nakamura	27 February 1995 (aged 21)	0	0	(Japan Football Association) Kashiwa Reysol
13	FW	Shinzo Koroki*	31 July 1986 (aged 30)	0	0	(Japan Football Association) Urawa Red Diamonds
14	MF	Yosuke Ideguchi	23 August 1996 (aged 19)	0	0	(Japan Football Association) Gamba Osaka
15	DF	Masashi Kamekawa	28 May 1993 (aged 23)	0	0	(Japan Football Association) Avispa Fukuoka
16	FW	Takuma Asano	10 November 1994 (aged 21)	0	0	(The Football Association) Arsenal
17	DF	Takuya Iwanami	18 June 1994 (aged 22)	0	0	(Japan Football Association) Vissel Kobe
18	MF	Takumi Minamino	16 January 1995 (aged 21)	0	0	(Austrian Football Association) Red Bull Salzburg

* Over-aged player.

=== Nigeria ===
The following is the Nigerian squad in the men's football tournament of the 2016 Summer Olympics.

Head coach: Samson Siasia

No.	Pos.	Player	Date of birth (age)	Caps	Goals	Club
1	GK	Daniel Akpeyi*	3 August 1986 (aged 30)	3	0	(South African Football Association) Chippa United
2	DF	Seth Sincere	28 April 1998 (aged 18)	25	0	(Nigeria Football Federation) Rhapsody
3	DF	Kingsley Madu	12 December 1995 (aged 20)	3	0	(Slovak Football Association) AS Trenčín
4	DF	Shehu Abdullahi	12 March 1993 (aged 23)	9	0	(Portuguese Football Federation) União da Madeira
5	DF	Saturday Erimuya	10 January 1998 (aged 18)	6	1	(Turkish Football Federation) Kayseri Erciyesspor
6	DF	William Troost-Ekong	1 September 1993 (aged 22)	6	0	(Norwegian Football Federation) Haugesund
7	FW	Aminu Umar	6 March 1995 (aged 21)	9	2	(Turkish Football Federation) Osmanlıspor
8	MF	Peter Etebo	9 November 1995 (aged 20)	19	11	(Portuguese Football Federation) Feirense
9	FW	Imoh Ezekiel (c)	24 October 1993 (aged 22)	6	0	(Royal Belgian Football Association) Anderlecht
10	MF	Mikel John Obi*	22 April 1987 (aged 29)	6	1	(The Football Association) Chelsea
11	FW	Junior Ajayi	29 January 1996 (aged 20)	19	10	(Egyptian Football Association) Al Ahly
12	MF	Saliu Popoola	7 August 1994 (aged 21)	8	0	(Royal Belgian Football Association) Seraing United
13	FW	Umar Sadiq	2 February 1997 (aged 19)	6	4	(Italian Football Federation) Roma
14	MF	Azubuike Okechukwu	19 April 1997 (aged 19)	24	1	(Turkish Football Federation) Yeni Malatyaspor
15	DF	Ndifreke Udo	15 August 1998 (aged 17)	18	0	(Nigeria Football Federation) Abia Warriors
16	DF	Stanley Amuzie	28 February 1996 (aged 20)	18	0	(Portuguese Football Federation) Olhanense
17	MF	Mohammed Usman	2 March 1994 (aged 22)	19	1	(Portuguese Football Federation) União da Madeira
18	GK	Emmanuel Daniel	17 December 1993 (aged 22)	25	0	(Nigeria Football Federation) Enugu Rangers

* Over-aged player.

=== Sweden ===
The following is the Swedish squad in the men's football tournament of the 2016 Summer Olympics. The team of 18 players was officially named on 15 July. On 23 July, Jordan Larsson left the squad due to refusal of his club to release for the Games.

Head coach: Håkan Ericson

No.	Pos.	Player	Date of birth (age)	Caps	Goals	Club
1	GK	Andreas Linde	24 July 1993 (aged 23)	1	0	(Norwegian Football Federation) Molde FK
2	DF	Adam Lundkvist	20 March 1994 (aged 22)	1	0	(Swedish Football Association) IF Elfsborg
3	DF	Alexander Milošević*	30 January 1992 (aged 24)	1	0	(German Football Association) Hannover 96
4	DF	Joakim Nilsson	6 February 1994 (aged 22)	1	0	(Swedish Football Association) IF Elfsborg
5	DF	Pa Konate	25 April 1994 (aged 22)	1	0	(Swedish Football Association) Malmö FF
6	MF	Abdul Khalili*	7 June 1992 (aged 24)	1	0	(Turkish Football Federation) Mersin İdman Yurdu
7	MF	Simon Tibbling	7 September 1994 (aged 21)	1	0	(Royal Dutch Football Association) Groningen
8	MF	Alexander Fransson	2 April 1994 (aged 22)	0	0	(Swiss Football Association) Basel
9	MF	Robin Quaison	9 October 1993 (aged 22)	1	0	(Italian Football Federation) Palermo
10	MF	Muamer Tanković	22 February 1995 (aged 21)	1	0	(Royal Dutch Football Association) AZ
11	MF	Astrit Ajdarević* (captain)	17 April 1990 (aged 26)	1	0	(Swedish Football Association) Örebro SK
12	FW	Mikael Ishak	31 March 1993 (aged 23)	0	0	(Danish Football Association) Randers FC
13	DF	Jacob Une Larsson	8 April 1994 (aged 22)	1	1	(Swedish Football Association) Djurgårdens IF
14	DF	Sebastian Starke Hedlund	5 April 1995 (aged 21)	1	0	(Swedish Football Association) Kalmar FF
15	DF	Noah Sonko Sundberg	6 June 1996 (aged 20)	0	0	(Swedish Football Association) GIF Sundsvall
17	MF	Ken Sema	30 September 1993 (aged 22)	1	1	(Swedish Football Association) Östersunds FK
18	GK	Tim Erlandsson	25 December 1996 (aged 19)	0	0	(The Football Association) Nottingham Forest
21	FW	Valmir Berisha	6 June 1996 (aged 20)	0	0	Unattached

* Over-aged player.

== Group C ==
=== Fiji ===
On 8 July, the Fiji Football Association announced a 24-man preliminary squad for the men's football tournament of the 2016 Summer Olympics. On 16 July, the final 18-man squad was officially announced. However, Kolinio Sivoki and Sakaraia Naisua were axed from the squad due to disciplinary reasons and Joseph Turagabeci joined the squad as a replacement.

Head coach: (Australia) Frank Farina

No.	Pos.	Player	Date of birth (age)	Caps	Goals	2016 club
1	GK	Simione Tamanisau*	5 June 1982 (aged 34)	0	0	(Fiji Football Association) Rewa
2	DF	Praneel Naidu	29 January 1995 (aged 21)	0	0	(Fiji Football Association) Ba
3	DF	Filipe Baravilala	25 November 1994 (aged 21)	0	0	(Fiji Football Association) Suva
4	DF	Jale Dreloa	21 April 1995 (aged 21)	0	0	(Fiji Football Association) Suva
5	MF	Antonio Tuivuna	20 March 1995 (aged 21)	0	0	(Fiji Football Association) Nadi
6	FW	Anish Khem	27 September 1993 (aged 22)	0	0	(Fiji Football Association) Nadi
7	MF	Nickel Chand	28 July 1995 (aged 21)	0	0	(Fiji Football Association) Suva
8	FW	Setareki Hughes	8 June 1995 (aged 21)	0	0	(Fiji Football Association) Rewa
9	FW	Roy Krishna* (c)	30 August 1987 (aged 28)	0	0	(New Zealand Football) Wellington Phoenix
10	MF	Ratu Nakalevu	7 March 1994 (aged 22)	0	0	(Fiji Football Association) Rewa
11	DF	Alvin Singh*	9 June 1988 (aged 28)	0	0	(Fiji Football Association) Ba
12	MF	Tevita Waranaivalu	16 September 1995 (aged 20)	0	0	(Fiji Football Association) Rewa
13	FW	Iosefo Verevou	1 May 1996 (aged 20)	0	0	(Fiji Football Association) Rewa
14	FW	Samuela Nabenia	9 February 1995 (aged 21)	0	0	(Fiji Football Association) Ba
15	FW	Saula Waqa	10 December 1995 (aged 20)	0	0	(Fiji Football Association) Ba
16	MF	Joseph Turagabeci	19 November 1994 (aged 21)	0	0	(Fiji Football Association) Suva
18	GK	Shaneel Naidu	28 March 1995 (aged 21)	0	0	(Fiji Football Association) Dreketi

* Over-aged player.

=== Germany ===
The following is the Germany final squad in the men's football tournament of the 2016 Summer Olympics. Leon Goretzka, the team captain, was injured in the first match of the tournament, though no alternate was initially used. However, he was later replaced by goalkeeper Eric Oelschlägel for only the gold medal match.

Head coach: Horst Hrubesch

No.	Pos.	Player	Date of birth (age)	Caps	Goals	2016 club
1	GK	Timo Horn	12 May 1993 (aged 23)	0	0	(German Football Association) 1. FC Köln
2	MF	Jeremy Toljan	8 August 1994 (aged 21)	0	0	(German Football Association) 1899 Hoffenheim
3	DF	Lukas Klostermann	3 June 1996 (aged 20)	0	0	(German Football Association) RB Leipzig
4	DF	Matthias Ginter	19 January 1994 (aged 22)	9	0	(German Football Association) Borussia Dortmund
5	DF	Niklas Süle	3 September 1995 (aged 20)	0	0	(German Football Association) 1899 Hoffenheim
6	MF	Sven Bender*	27 April 1989 (aged 27)	7	0	(German Football Association) Borussia Dortmund
7	MF	Max Meyer (c)	18 September 1995 (aged 20)	1	0	(German Football Association) Schalke 04
8	MF	Lars Bender*	27 April 1989 (aged 27)	19	4	(German Football Association) Bayer Leverkusen
9	FW	Davie Selke	20 January 1995 (aged 21)	0	0	(German Football Association) RB Leipzig
10	MF	Leon Goretzka (c)	6 February 1995 (aged 21)	1	0	(German Football Association) Schalke 04
11	MF	Julian Brandt	2 May 1996 (aged 20)	1	0	(German Football Association) Bayer Leverkusen
12	GK	Jannik Huth	15 April 1994 (aged 22)	0	0	(German Football Association) Mainz 05
13	DF	Philipp Max	30 September 1993 (aged 22)	0	0	(German Football Association) FC Augsburg
14	DF	Robert Bauer	9 April 1995 (aged 21)	0	0	(German Football Association) FC Ingolstadt
15	MF	Max Christiansen	25 September 1996 (aged 19)	0	0	(German Football Association) FC Ingolstadt
16	MF	Grischa Prömel	9 January 1995 (aged 21)	0	0	(German Football Association) Karlsruher SC
17	MF	Serge Gnabry	14 July 1995 (aged 21)	0	0	(The Football Association) Arsenal
18	FW	Nils Petersen*	6 December 1988 (aged 27)	0	0	(German Football Association) SC Freiburg
22	GK	Eric Oelschlägel	20 September 1995 (aged 20)	0	0	(German Football Association) Werder Bremen

* Over-aged player.

=== Mexico ===
The following is the Mexico squad in the men's football tournament of the 2016 Summer Olympics. The team of 18 players was officially named on 7 July.

Head coach: Raúl Gutiérrez

No.	Pos.	Player	Date of birth (age)	Caps	Goals	Club
1	GK	Alfredo Talavera*	18 September 1982 (aged 33)	0	0	(Mexican Football Federation) Toluca
2	DF	José Abella	10 February 1994 (aged 22)	9	3	(Mexican Football Federation) Santos Laguna
3	DF	Jordan Silva	30 July 1994 (aged 22)	14	1	(Mexican Football Federation) Toluca
4	DF	César Montes	24 February 1997 (aged 19)	0	0	(Mexican Football Federation) Monterrey
5	MF	Michael Pérez Ortiz	14 February 1993 (aged 23)	3	1	(Mexican Football Federation) Guadalajara
6	DF	Jorge Torres Nilo*	16 January 1988 (aged 28)	0	0	(Mexican Football Federation) UANL
7	MF	Rodolfo Pizarro	15 February 1994 (aged 22)	7	0	(Mexican Football Federation) Pachuca
8	MF	Hirving Lozano	30 July 1995 (aged 21)	5	1	(Mexican Football Federation) Pachuca
9	FW	Oribe Peralta* (c)	12 January 1984 (aged 32)	5	6	(Mexican Football Federation) América
10	MF	Víctor Guzmán	3 February 1995 (aged 21)	16	1	(Mexican Football Federation) Pachuca
11	FW	Marco Bueno	31 March 1994 (aged 22)	13	5	(Mexican Football Federation) Guadalajara
12	GK	Gibrán Lajud	25 December 1993 (aged 22)	20	0	(Mexican Football Federation) Tijuana
13	DF	Carlos Salcedo	29 September 1993 (aged 22)	8	0	(Mexican Football Federation) Guadalajara
14	DF	Érick Aguirre	23 February 1997 (aged 19)	4	0	(Mexican Football Federation) Pachuca
15	MF	Érick Gutiérrez	15 June 1995 (aged 21)	3	0	(Mexican Football Federation) Pachuca
16	FW	Carlos Cisneros	30 August 1993 (aged 22)	7	3	(Mexican Football Federation) Guadalajara
17	MF	Alfonso González	5 September 1994 (aged 21)	8	2	(Mexican Football Federation) Monterrey
18	FW	Erick Torres	19 January 1993 (aged 23)	9	7	(United States Soccer Federation) Houston Dynamo
20	MF	Raúl López	23 February 1993 (aged 23)			(Mexican Football Federation) Pachuca
21	FW	Carlos Fierro	24 July 1994 (aged 22)			(Mexican Football Federation) Querétaro

* Over-aged player.

=== South Korea ===
The following is the South Korea squad in the men's football tournament of the 2016 Summer Olympics. The team of 18 players was officially named on 29 June. On 17 July, Song Ju-hun left the squad due to injury and was replaced by Kim Min-tae.

Head coach: Shin Tae-yong

No.	Pos.	Player	Date of birth (age)	Caps	Goals	Club
1	GK	Kim Dong-jun	19 December 1994 (aged 21)	19	0	(Korea Football Association) Seongnam FC
2	DF	Sim Sang-min	21 May 1993 (aged 23)	27	0	(Korea Football Association) FC Seoul
3	DF	Lee Seul-chan	15 August 1993 (aged 22)	18	0	(Korea Football Association) Jeonnam Dragons
4	MF	Kim Min-tae	26 November 1993 (aged 22)	11	0	(Japan Football Association) Vegalta Sendai
5	DF	Choi Kyu-baek	23 January 1994 (aged 22)	5	1	(Korea Football Association) Jeonbuk Hyundai
6	DF	Jang Hyun-soo* (c)	28 September 1991 (aged 24)	16	3	(Chinese Football Association) Guangzhou R&F
7	FW	Son Heung-min*	8 July 1992 (aged 24)	0	0	(The Football Association) Tottenham Hotspur
8	MF	Moon Chang-jin	12 July 1993 (aged 23)	28	16	(Korea Football Association) Pohang Steelers
9	FW	Suk Hyun-jun*	29 June 1991 (aged 25)	2	0	(Portuguese Football Federation) FC Porto
10	MF	Ryu Seung-woo	17 December 1993 (aged 22)	22	4	(German Football Association) Bayer Leverkusen
11	FW	Hwang Hee-chan	26 January 1996 (aged 20)	12	1	(Austrian Football Association) Red Bull Salzburg
12	MF	Lee Chan-dong	10 January 1993 (aged 23)	11	1	(Korea Football Association) Gwangju FC
13	DF	Park Dong-jin	10 December 1994 (aged 21)	16	0	(Korea Football Association) Gwangju FC
14	MF	Park Yong-woo	10 September 1993 (aged 22)	15	2	(Korea Football Association) FC Seoul
15	DF	Jung Seung-hyun	3 April 1994 (aged 22)	17	2	(Korea Football Association) Ulsan Hyundai
16	MF	Kwon Chang-hoon	30 June 1994 (aged 22)	15	7	(Korea Football Association) Suwon Samsung Bluewings
17	MF	Lee Chang-min	20 January 1994 (aged 22)	22	4	(Korea Football Association) Jeju United
18	GK	Gu Sung-yun	27 June 1994 (aged 22)	12	0	(Japan Football Association) Consadole Sapporo

* Over-aged player.

== Group D ==
=== Algeria ===
The following is the Algeria squad in the men's football tournament of the 2016 Summer Olympics. The team of 18 players was officially named on 14 July.

Head coach: (Switzerland) Pierre-André Schürmann

No.	Pos.	Player	Date of birth (age)	Caps	Goals	Club
1	GK	Abdelkader Salhi	19 March 1993 (aged 23)	12	0	(Algerian Football Federation) ASO Chlef
2	DF	Miloud Rebiaï	12 December 1993 (aged 22)	0	0	(Algerian Football Federation) ES Sétif
3	DF	Ayoub Abdellaoui	16 February 1993 (aged 23)	13	0	(Algerian Football Federation) USM Alger
4	DF	Abdelghani Demmou*	29 January 1989 (aged 27)	1	0	(Algerian Football Federation) MC Alger
5	DF	Ryad Kenniche (c)	30 April 1993 (aged 23)	7	1	(Algerian Football Federation) ES Sétif
6	MF	Mohamed Benkhemassa	28 June 1993 (aged 23)	17	2	(Algerian Football Federation) USM Alger
7	FW	Baghdad Bounedjah*	24 November 1991 (aged 24)	6	4	(Qatar Football Association) Al Sadd SC
8	MF	Haris Belkebla	28 January 1994 (aged 22)	0	0	(French Football Federation) Tours
9	FW	Mohamed Benkablia	2 February 1994 (aged 22)	0	0	(Algerian Football Federation) ASM Oran
10	FW	Abderrahmane Meziane	7 March 1994 (aged 22)	13	4	(Algerian Football Federation) USM Alger
11	FW	Zakaria Haddouche	19 August 1994 (aged 21)	9	1	(Algerian Football Federation) ES Sétif
12	MF	Raouf Benguit	5 April 1996 (aged 20)	14	0	(Algerian Football Federation) USM Alger
13	FW	Oussama Darfalou	29 September 1993 (aged 22)	11	4	(Algerian Football Federation) USM Alger
14	MF	Sofiane Bendebka*	9 August 1992 (aged 23)	1	1	(Algerian Football Federation) NA Hussein Dey
15	DF	Houari Ferhani	11 February 1993 (aged 23)	13	0	(Algerian Football Federation) JS Kabylie
16	GK	Farid Chaâl	3 July 1994 (aged 22)	0	0	(Algerian Football Federation) USM El Harrach
17	MF	Zakaria Draoui	20 February 1994 (aged 22)	6	0	(Algerian Football Federation) CR Belouizdad
18	FW	Rachid Aït-Atmane	4 February 1993 (aged 23)	1	0	(Royal Spanish Football Federation) Sporting Gijón
22	GK	Oussama Methazem	16 December 1993 (aged 22)	0	0	(Algerian Football Federation) RC Arbaâ

* Over-aged player.

=== Argentina ===
The following is the Argentina squad in the men's football tournament of the 2016 Summer Olympics. The team of 18 players was officially named on 6 July and confirmed on 14 July. On 26 July, Manuel Lanzini left the squad due to injury and was replaced by Cristian Pavón.

Head coach: Julio Olarticoechea

No.	Pos.	Player	Date of birth (age)	Caps	Goals	Club
1	GK	Gerónimo Rulli*	20 May 1992 (aged 24)	3	0	(Royal Spanish Football Federation) Real Sociedad
2	DF	Lautaro Gianetti	13 November 1993 (aged 22)	3	0	(Argentine Football Association) Vélez Sarsfield
3	DF	Alexis Soto	20 October 1993 (aged 22)	3	0	(Argentine Football Association) Banfield
4	DF	José Luis Gómez	13 September 1993 (aged 22)	3	0	(Argentine Football Association) Lanús
5	MF	Lucas Romero	18 April 1994 (aged 22)	1	0	(Brazilian Football Confederation) Cruzeiro
6	DF	Víctor Cuesta* (c)	19 November 1988 (aged 27)	2	0	(Argentine Football Association) Independiente
7	MF	Cristian Pavón	21 January 1996 (aged 20)	3	0	(Argentine Football Association) Boca Juniors
8	MF	Santiago Ascacíbar	25 February 1997 (aged 19)	3	0	(Argentine Football Association) Estudiantes
9	FW	Jonathan Calleri	23 September 1993 (aged 22)	3	1	(Brazilian Football Confederation) São Paulo
10	FW	Ángel Correa	9 March 1995 (aged 21)	3	1	(Royal Spanish Football Federation) Atlético Madrid
11	FW	Giovanni Simeone	5 July 1995 (aged 21)	3	0	(Argentine Football Association) Banfield
12	GK	Axel Werner	28 February 1996 (aged 20)	0	0	(Argentine Football Association) Atlético de Rafaela
13	MF	Joaquín Arzura	18 May 1993 (aged 23)	0	0	(Argentine Football Association) River Plate
14	MF	Giovani Lo Celso	9 April 1996 (aged 20)	3	0	(Argentine Football Association) Rosario Central
15	DF	Lisandro Magallán	27 September 1993 (aged 22)	1	0	(Argentine Football Association) Boca Juniors
16	DF	Leandro Vega	27 May 1996 (aged 20)	1	0	(Argentine Football Association) River Plate
17	MF	Mauricio Martínez	20 February 1993 (aged 23)	3	1	(Argentine Football Association) Rosario Central
18	FW	Cristian Espinoza	3 April 1995 (aged 21)	3	0	(Argentine Football Association) Huracán

* Over-aged player.

=== Honduras ===
The following is the Honduras final squad in the men's football tournament of the 2016 Summer Olympics. On 28 July, Kevin López left the squad due to injury and was replaced by Marcelo Espinal.

Head coach: (Colombia) Jorge Luis Pinto

No.	Pos.	Player	Date of birth (age)	Caps	Goals	2016 club
1	GK	Luis López	13 September 1993 (aged 22)	0	0	(National Autonomous Federation of Football of Honduras) Real España
2	DF	Jonathan Paz	18 June 1995 (aged 21)	0	0	(National Autonomous Federation of Football of Honduras) CD Real Sociedad
3	DF	Marcelo Pereira	27 May 1995 (aged 21)	0	0	(National Autonomous Federation of Football of Honduras) Motagua
4	DF	Kevin Álvarez	3 August 1996 (aged 20)	0	0	(National Autonomous Federation of Football of Honduras) Olimpia
5	DF	Allans Vargas	25 September 1993 (aged 22)	0	0	(National Autonomous Federation of Football of Honduras) Real España
6	MF	Bryan Acosta (c)	24 November 1993 (aged 22)	0	0	(National Autonomous Federation of Football of Honduras) Real España
7	MF	Brayan Ramírez	16 June 1994 (aged 22)	0	0	(National Autonomous Federation of Football of Honduras) Juticalpa
8	DF	Johnny Palacios*	20 December 1986 (aged 29)	0	0	(National Autonomous Federation of Football of Honduras) Olimpia
9	FW	Anthony Lozano	25 April 1993 (aged 23)	0	0	(Royal Spanish Football Federation) Tenerife
10	MF	Óscar Salas	8 December 1993 (aged 22)	0	0	(National Autonomous Federation of Football of Honduras) Olimpia
11	MF	Marcelo Espinal	24 February 1993 (aged 23)	0	0	Unattached
12	FW	Romell Quioto*	9 August 1991 (aged 24)	0	0	(National Autonomous Federation of Football of Honduras) Olimpia
13	MF	Jhow Benavídez	26 December 1995 (aged 20)	0	0	(National Autonomous Federation of Football of Honduras) Real España
14	MF	Elder Torres	14 April 1995 (aged 21)	0	0	(United States Soccer Federation) Real Monarchs
15	MF	Allan Banegas	4 October 1993 (aged 22)	0	0	(National Autonomous Federation of Football of Honduras) Marathón
16	DF	Brayan García	26 May 1993 (aged 23)	0	0	(National Autonomous Federation of Football of Honduras) Vida
17	FW	Alberth Elis	12 February 1996 (aged 20)	0	0	(National Autonomous Federation of Football of Honduras) Olimpia
18	GK	Harold Fonseca	8 October 1993 (aged 22)	0	0	(National Autonomous Federation of Football of Honduras) Juticalpa

* Over-aged player.

=== Portugal ===
The following is the Portugal squad in the men's football tournament of the 2016 Summer Olympics. The team of 18 players was officially named on 14 July. On 17 July, Pité replaced Nuno Santos. On 21 July, Fábio Sturgeon left the squad due to injury and was replaced by Fernando Fonseca.

Head coach: Rui Jorge

No.	Pos.	Player	Date of birth (age)	Caps	Goals	Club
1	GK	Bruno Varela	4 November 1994 (aged 21)	0	0	(Portuguese Football Federation) Vitória de Setúbal
2	DF	Ricardo Esgaio (c)	16 May 1993 (aged 23)	1	0	(Portuguese Football Federation) Sporting CP
3	DF	Tiago Ilori	28 October 1993 (aged 22)	1	0	(The Football Association) Liverpool
4	DF	Tobias Figueiredo	2 February 1994 (aged 22)	1	0	(Portuguese Football Federation) Nacional
5	DF	Edgar Ié	5 May 1994 (aged 22)	0	0	(Royal Spanish Football Federation) Villarreal B
6	MF	Tomás Podstawski	30 January 1995 (aged 21)	0	0	(Portuguese Football Federation) Porto B
7	MF	André Martins*	21 January 1990 (aged 26)	0	0	(Hellenic Football Federation) Olympiacos
8	MF	Sérgio Oliveira*	2 June 1992 (aged 24)	1	0	(Portuguese Football Federation) Porto
9	FW	Gonçalo Paciência	1 August 1994 (aged 22)	0	0	(Portuguese Football Federation) Porto
10	MF	Bruno Fernandes	8 September 1994 (aged 21)	1	0	(Italian Football Federation) Udinese
11	FW	Salvador Agra*	11 November 1991 (aged 24)	0	0	(Portuguese Football Federation) Nacional
12	GK	Joel Castro Pereira	28 June 1996 (aged 20)	0	0	(The Football Association) Manchester United
13	FW	Pité	22 August 1994 (aged 21)	0	0	(Portuguese Football Federation) Tondela
14	DF	Paulo Henrique	23 October 1996 (aged 19)	0	0	(Portuguese Football Federation) Paços de Ferreira
15	MF	Fernando Fonseca	14 March 1997 (aged 19)	0	0	(Portuguese Football Federation) Porto B
16	MF	Francisco Ramos	10 April 1995 (aged 21)	1	0	(Portuguese Football Federation) Chaves
17	FW	Carlos Mané	11 March 1994 (aged 22)	0	0	(Portuguese Football Federation) Sporting CP
18	MF	Tiago Silva	2 June 1993 (aged 23)	0	0	(Portuguese Football Federation) Feirense

* Over-aged player.

== See also ==
- Football at the 2016 Summer Olympics – Women's team squads
