= Sebastian Starke Hedlund =

Swedish footballer

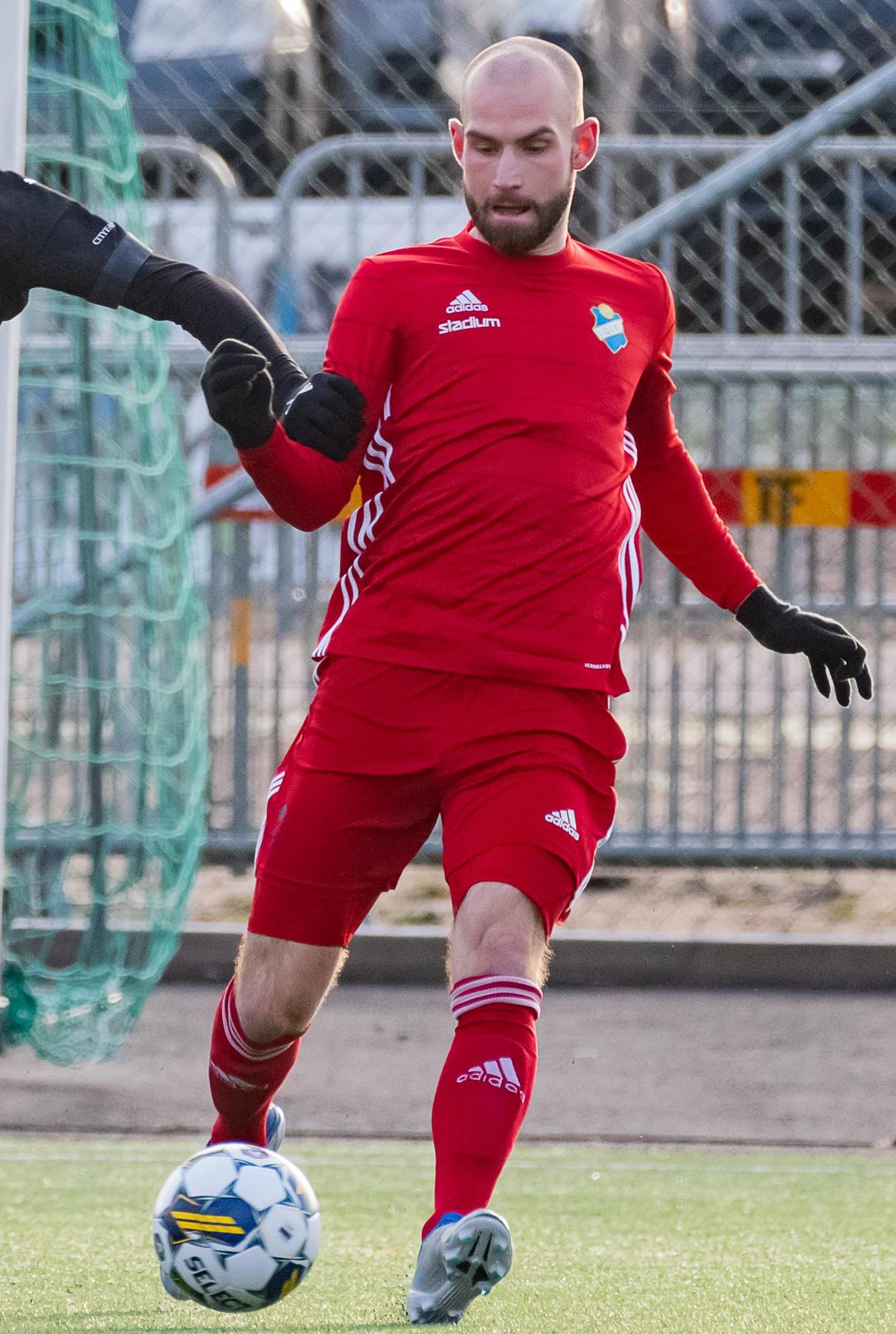

Personal information
- Full name: Björn Sebastian; Starke Hedlund
- Date of birth: 5 April 1995 (age 31)
- Place of birth: Stockholm, Sweden
- Height: 1.84 m (6 ft 0 in)
- Position: Defender

Team information
- Current team: Östers IF
- Number: 4

Youth career
- 2000–2009: Älvsjö AIK
- 2009–2012: IF Brommapojkarna
- 2012–2014: Schalke 04

Senior career*
Years	Team	Apps	(Gls)
2014–2015	Schalke 04 II	8	(0)
2015	GAIS	15	(0)
2016–2018	Kalmar FF	12	(0)
2017	→ Varbergs BoIS (loan)	7	(0)
2018	→ Mjøndalen IF (loan)	2	(0)
2018–2022	Valur	83	(2)
2023–	Östers IF	79	(1)

International career
2010–2012	Sweden U17	13	(0)
2012–2014	Sweden U19	13	(1)
2014–2016	Sweden U21/O	9	(0)
- * Club domestic league appearances and goals as of 12 November 2026

Björn Sebastian Starke Hedlund (born 5 April 1995) is a Swedish footballer who plays for Östers IF as a defender.

Hedlund has played in Germany, Sweden, Norway and Iceland. He represented Sweden at the 2016 Summer Olympics in Rio de Janeiro, Brazil.

== Career ==
Whilst Hedlund was at IF Brommapojkarna, he worked with Marcus Karlsson, who arranged trials with Schalke. He tried out with Schalke in November 2011, and Schalke invited him back for more tryouts. Hedlund joined Schalke after playing for their U19 team in a tournament, which he described as "successful". During his time there, he began learning German.

On 14 July 2015, Hedlund was announced at GAIS on a permanent transfer.

On 7 November 2015, Hedlund was announced at Kalmar FF on a permanent transfer. He played out

On 15 March 2017, Hedlund was announced at Varbergs BoIS on a season long loan. He was described as "doing well" for the club and made four starts before returning in June 2017.

On 28 March 2018, Hedlund was announced at Mjøndalen IF on a four month loan deal.

On 30 June 2018, Hedlund was announced at Valur on a one year contract, with the option of another year. He became a regular player in the starting XI and won the league with Valur in 2022.

In December 2022, Hedlund joined Öster on a free transfer, signing a two year contract with the club.

== International career ==
On 15 October 2013, Hedlund scored his first international goal for Sweden U19s against Azerbaijan, scoring in the 33rd minute.

On 15 July 2016, Hedlund was called up to the Sweden team for the 2016 Summer Olympics.
