= Eric Oelschlägel =

German footballer (born 1995)

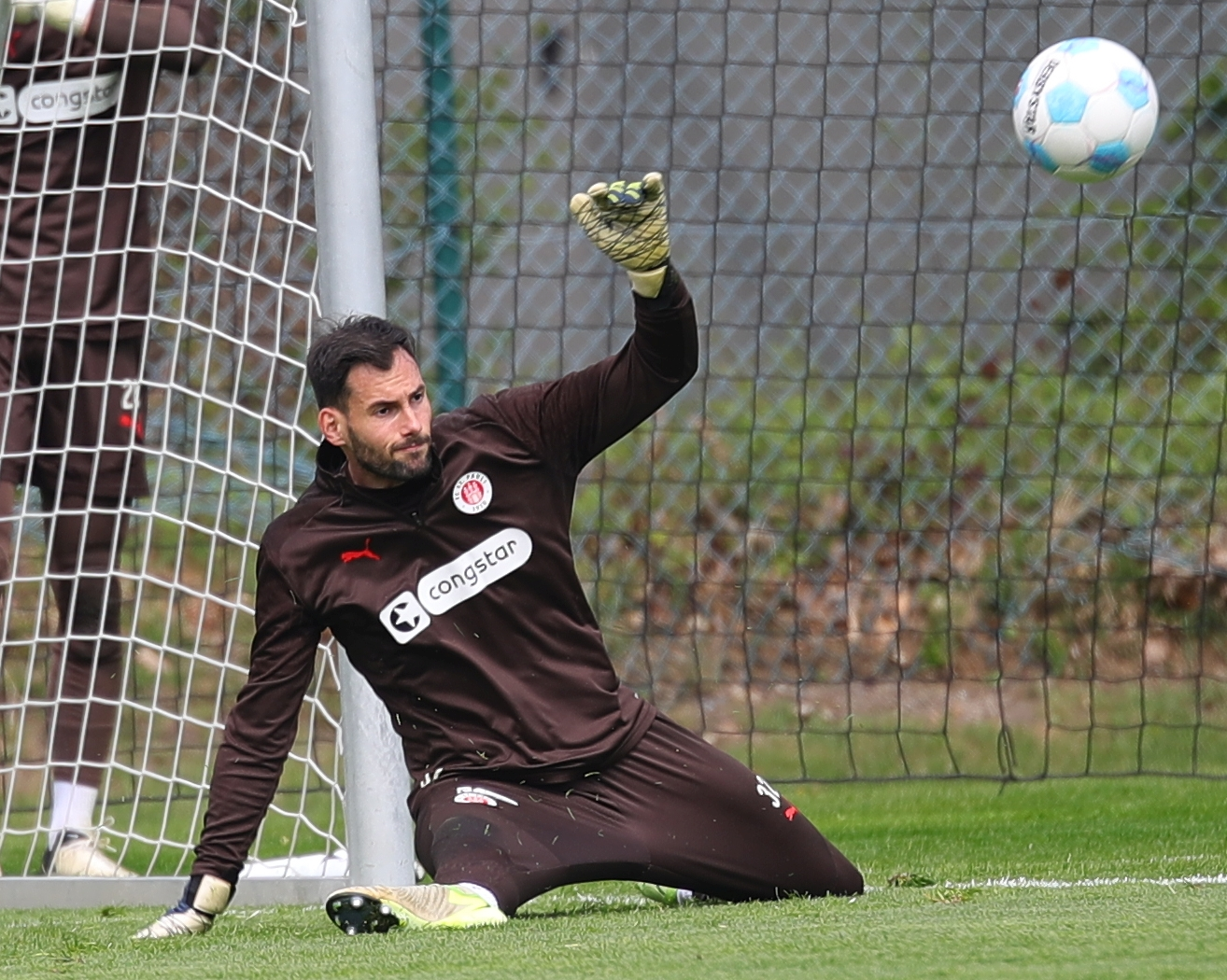
- Oelschlägel in 2025

Personal information
- Full name: Eric Dirk Oelschlägel
- Date of birth: 20 September 1995 (age 31)
- Place of birth: Hoyerswerda, Germany
- Height: 1.93 m (6 ft 4 in)
- Position: Goalkeeper

Team information
- Current team: KSV Hessen Kassel

Youth career
- 2001–2006: Dynamo Dresden
- 2006–2008: SG Dresden Striesen
- 2008–2012: Dynamo Dresden
- 2012–2014: Werder Bremen

Senior career*
Years	Team	Apps	(Gls)
2014–2018	Werder Bremen II	68	(0)
2016–2018	Werder Bremen	0	(0)
2018–2020	Borussia Dortmund II	43	(0)
2018–2020	Borussia Dortmund	0	(0)
2020	Jong Utrecht	3	(0)
2020–2022	Utrecht	27	(0)
2022–2024	Emmen	22	(0)
2024–2025	FC St. Pauli	0	(0)
2024–2025	FC St. Pauli II	2	(0)
2026–	KSV Hessen Kassel	0	(0)
Medal record
Olympic Games
Silver medal – second place	2016 Rio de Janeiro	Team
- * Club domestic league appearances and goals as of 24 September 2026

Eric Dirk Oelschlägel (born 20 September 1995) is a German professional footballer who plays as a goalkeeper for KSV Hessen Kassel. He started his career with Werder Bremen, where he spent four seasons with the club's reserves. After two years with Borussia Dortmund he joined FC Utrecht in 2020. He then moved to Emmen in July 2022 before signing with FC St. Pauli in October 2024.

== Club career ==
Oelschlägel began his career in 2001 at Dynamo Dresden. From 2006 to 2008 he played for SG Dresden Striesen, before returning to Dynamo. In 2012, he joined the youth system of Werder Bremen. In the 2014–15 season Oelschlägel moved to the second team, who at that time played in the Regionalliga Nord making his debut on 16 November 2014 debut in a 4–0 away win against FT Braunschweig. In 2015, he celebrated promotion to the 3. Liga with the second team.

After Oelschlägel went to the first team's training camp in Neuruppin in July 2015, he signed a professional contract with Bremen in January 2016 which lasts until 30 June 2018. With multiple goalkeepers injured, Oelschlägel was Felix Wiedwald's backup in the first team's match against Schalke on 24 January 2016. Having suffered an injury early in the first half of the 2015–16 season he played most second-team matches in the second half of the season.

On 20 June 2018, Oelschlägel signed for Borussia Dortmund on a one-year deal from Werder Bremen for an undisclosed fee as third choice keeper, playing for Borussia Dortmund second team in the Regionalliga West. In February 2019, he played his first match with the first-team, appearing against his former club Werder Bremen in the DFB-Pokal with first and second goalkeepers Roman Bürki and Marwin Hitz not fit to play. Oelschlägel made multiple saves during the match before making a mistake which resulted in Werder Bremen equalising for 3–3 in extra-time. Werder Bremen went through on penalties with Oelschlägel unable to save a penalty.

On 5 October 2020, Oelschlägel moved to FC Utrecht on a free transfer, having agreed a one-year contract.

On 15 July 2022, Oelschlägel joined FC Emmen on a two-year deal.

On 24 September 2026, after spending a season without a club, he signed a one-year contract with KSV Hessen Kassel.

== International career ==
Oelschlägel was selected as an alternate player in the German Olympic team's squad for the football tournament at the 2016 Summer Olympics in Rio de Janeiro. He remained inactive until the gold medal match, when manager Horst Hrubesch called him up in place of midfielder Leon Goretzka, who was injured in the team's opening match of the tournament. Though he was not used in the match, he earned a silver medal after Germany lost to Brazil in a penalty shoot-out.

== Career statistics ==
As of match played on 27 April 2025

Appearances and goals by club, season and competition
Club	Season	League			Cup		Other		Total	
Club	Season	Division	Apps	Goals	Apps	Goals	Apps	Goals	Apps	Goals
Werder Bremen II	2014–15	Regionalliga Nord	1	0	—		—		1	0
Werder Bremen II	2015–16	3. Liga	19	0	—		—		19	0
Werder Bremen II	2016–17	3. Liga	12	0	—		—		12	0
Werder Bremen II	2017–18	3. Liga	36	0	—		—		36	0
Werder Bremen II	Total		68	0	—		—		68	0
Borussia Dortmund II	2018–19	Regionalliga West	28	0	—		—		28	0
Borussia Dortmund II	2019–20	Regionalliga West	15	0	—		—		15	0
Borussia Dortmund II	Total		43	0	—		—		43	0
Borussia Dortmund	2018–19	Bundesliga	0	0	1	0	—		1	0
Jong FC Utrecht	2020–21	Eerste Divisie	1	0	—		—		1	0
Jong FC Utrecht	2021–22	Eerste Divisie	2	0	—		—		2	0
Jong FC Utrecht	Total		3	0	—		—		3	0
FC Utrecht	2020–21	Eredivisie	23	0	1	0	2 (Note: Appearances in play-offs for UEFA Europa League qualification)	0	26	0
FC Utrecht	2021–22	Eredivisie	4	0	0	0	2	0	6	0
FC Utrecht	Total		27	0	1	0	4	0	32	0
FC Emmen	2022–23	Eredivisie	9	0	0	0	0	0	9	0
FC Emmen	2023–24	Eredivisie	13	0	1	0	4	0	18	0
FC Emmen	Total		22	0	1	0	4	0	27	0
FC St. Pauli	2024–25	Bundesliga	0	0	0	0	—		0	0
St. Pauli II	2024–25	Regionalliga Nord	2	0	0	0	—		2	0
Career total			165	0	3	0	8	0	176	0

== Honours ==
Werder Bremen II

- Regionalliga Nord: 2015

Borussia Dortmund

- DFL-Supercup: 2019

Germany U23

- Olympic silver medal: 2016
