= Pité =

Portuguese footballer

Personal information
- Full name: Luís Pedro de Freitas Pinto Trabulo
- Date of birth: 22 August 1994 (age 32)
- Place of birth: Esgueira, Portugal
- Height: 1.88 m (6 ft 2 in)
- Position: Midfielder

Youth career
- 2003–2005: Futsal
- 2005–2013: Beira-Mar

Senior career*
Years	Team	Apps	(Gls)
2013–2014	Beira-Mar	35	(6)
2014–2017	Porto B	48	(8)
2016–2017	→ Tondela (loan)	12	(1)
2017–2020	Tondela	43	(4)
2021–2022	Arouca	40	(3)
2022–2024	Mafra	44	(8)
2024–2026	Torreense	39	(2)

International career
2016	Portugal U23	3	(1)
- * Club domestic league appearances and goals as of 18:57, 20 May 2026 (UTC)

Luís Pedro de Freitas Pinto Trabulo (born 22 August 1994), known as Pité, is a Portuguese professional footballer who plays as a midfielder.

He played 82 games and scored six goals in the Primeira Liga for Tondela and Arouca but spent most of his career in the second tier, making over 150 appearances for Beira-Mar, Porto B, Arouca, Mafra and Torreense and winning the title with the second of those teams in 2016.

Pité played for the Portugal Olympic team at the 2016 tournament.

== Club career ==
=== Beira-Mar ===
Born in the town of Esgueira, Aveiro District, Pité joined local S.C. Beira-Mar's youth system in 2005, aged 11. He made his debut with the first team on 27 July 2013, playing the full 90 minutes in a 1–0 away loss against Portimonense S.C. in the first round of the Taça da Liga. His maiden appearance in the Segunda Liga took place on 12 August, in a 2–3 home defeat to FC Porto B.

Pité scored his first goal as a senior on 2 October 2013, helping to a 3–2 win at C.D. Santa Clara. He missed only seven matches during the campaign, helping to a 12th-place finish amongst 22 teams.

=== Porto ===
On 1 July 2014, Pité signed for FC Porto, being assigned to the reserves also in the second division. He spent two seasons playing for them, split roughly between starting games and coming on as a substitute.

Pité was called up for the first team for their League Cup dead rubber against C.D. Feirense on 27 January 2016, remaining unused by manager José Peseiro in the 2–0 away loss.

=== Tondela ===
On 15 July 2016, Pité was loaned to Primeira Liga club C.D. Tondela for the season. He made 15 appearances across all competitions as it finally avoided relegation, scoring once as consolation in a 1–2 home loss to F.C. Arouca on 8 January 2017.

Pité joined on a permanent basis on 7 June 2017, until 2020.

=== Arouca ===
Out of work since leaving Tondela, Pité found a new team on 13 January 2021, joining second-tier Arouca on an 18-month deal. He scored his first goals on the final day of the season on 22 May, ensuring a play-off place with two in a 3–1 home victory over G.D. Chaves; three days later he scored the opening goal against Rio Ave F.C. in a 3–0 win in the play-off first leg (5–0 aggregate).

In his top-flight season at the Estádio Municipal de Arouca, Pité was most often a substitute. In that role, he scored an added-time equaliser in a 2–2 draw with Vitória de Guimarães on 18 September 2021.

=== Later career ===
On 9 June 2022, Pité signed a two-year deal to be C.D. Mafra's first signing ahead of the second-division campaign. At its conclusion, he joined S.C.U. Torreense of the same league.

== International career ==
On 17 July 2016, Pité was called to the Portugal Olympic squad due to appear in the year's Summer Olympic Games, replacing Nuno Santos. He came on for Porto's Sérgio Oliveira midway through the second half of the group stage opener against Argentina, and scored the final 2–0 in the 84th minute following a blunder from goalkeeper Gerónimo Rulli.

== Career statistics ==
As of 22 May 2016

Appearances and goals by club, season and competition
Club	Season	League			Taça de Portugal		Taça da Liga		Europe		Total	
Club	Season	Division	Apps	Goals	Apps	Goals	Apps	Goals	Apps	Goals	Apps	Goals
Beira-Mar	2013–14	Segunda Liga	35	6	2	0	6	0	—		43	6
Porto B	2014–15	Segunda Liga	26	1	—		—		—		26	1
Porto B	2015–16	Segunda Liga	22	7	—		—		—		22	7
Porto B	Total		48	8	—		—		—		48	8
Tondela	2016–17	Primeira Liga	0	0	0	0	0	0	—		0	0
Career total			83	14	2	0	6	0	—		91	14

== Honours ==
Porto B

- Segunda Liga: 2015–16

Torreense

- Taça de Portugal: 2025–26
