= Kellyton (footballer) =

Brazilian footballer (born 1995)

Personal information
- Full name: Kellyton Rodrigo de Oliveira
- Date of birth: 8 March 1995 (age 31)
- Place of birth: Belo Horizonte, Brazil
- Height: 1.80 m (5 ft 11 in)
- Position: Right-back

Team information
- Current team: Barra-SC

Youth career
- 2012–2015: Brasilis

Senior career*
Years	Team	Apps	(Gls)
2015–2016	Itapirense	1	(0)
2016–2017	RB Bragantino	34	(0)
2018	Inter de Lages	21	(0)
2018	Rio Claro	16	(0)
2019	Patrocinense	9	(0)
2019	Uberaba	2	(0)
2019	Gil Vicente	1	(0)
2020	Sampaio Corrêa	2	(0)
2020	Botafogo-PB	7	(0)
2021	URT	9	(0)
2021–2022	Uberlândia	29	(3)
2022	Inter de Limeira	12	(0)
2022	Itabirito	8	(0)
2023–2024	Portuguesa-SP	19	(1)
2024	North	14	(7)
2024	XV de Piracicaba	0	(0)
2025–	Barra-SC	3	(0)
- * Club domestic league appearances and goals as of 23:10, 1 February 2025 (UTC)

Kellyton Rodrigo de Oliveira (born 8 March 1995), is a Brazilian professional footballer who plays as a right-back for Barra-SC.

== Career ==
Kellyton made his professional debut with RB Bragantino in a 1-0 Campeonato Brasileiro Série B loss to Londrinda on 26 November 2016. On 28 June 2019, Kellyton joined Gil Vicente in the Portuguese Primeira Liga. On 29 August 2019 his Gil Vincente contract was terminated by mutual consent.
