= Mauricio Martínez (Argentine footballer) =

Argentine footballer

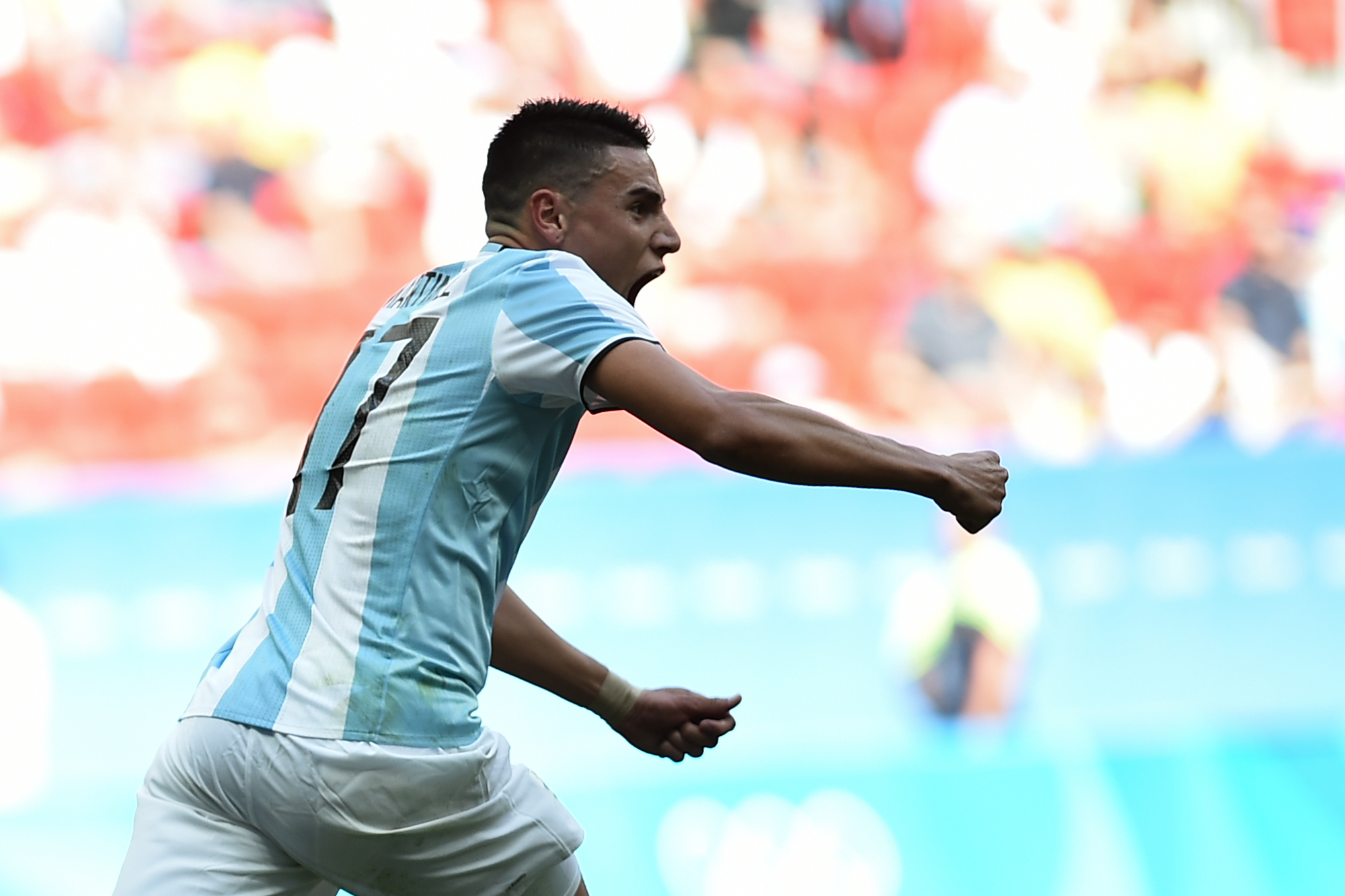
- Martínez, playing for Argentina at the 2016 Olympic tournament, after scoring against Honduras

Personal information
- Full name: Mauricio Leonel Martínez
- Date of birth: 20 February 1993 (age 33)
- Place of birth: Santo Tomé, Argentina
- Height: 1.86 m (6 ft 1 in)
- Positions: Defensive midfielder; centre-back

Team information
- Current team: Sarmiento
- Number: 14

Youth career
- ?–2010: Santo Tomé
- 2010–2013: Unión Santa Fe

Senior career*
Years	Team	Apps	(Gls)
2013–2016	Unión Santa Fe	91	(3)
2016–2018	Rosario Central	31	(2)
2018–2023	Racing Club	49	(4)
2023–2024	L.D.U. Quito	21	(2)
2024–2026	Rosario Central	30	(0)
2025	→ Unión Santa Fe (loan)	31	(3)
2026–	Sarmiento	26	(2)

International career
2016	Argentina U23	3	(1)
- * Club domestic league appearances and goals as of 18:06, 10 November 2026 (UTC)

Mauricio Leonel Martínez (born 20 February 1993), nicknamed Caramelo, is an Argentine professional footballer who plays for the Argentine club Sarmiento as a defensive midfielder or centre-back.

== Club career ==
Born in Santo Tomé, Argentina, a town inside of Santa Fe, he grew in the local football (Independiente de Santo Tome) club until 2010, when he joined Unión de Santa Fe's youth club and, from 2013 to 2016, its senior club. In July 2016 he joined Rosario Central. In 2018, he joined Racing Club.

== International career ==
He represented Argentina in the football competition at the 2016 Summer Olympics.

=== International goals ===
#	Date	Venue	Opponent	Score	Result	Competition
1.	10 August 2016	Estádio Olímpico João Havelange, Rio de Janeiro, Brazil	Honduras	1–1	1–1	2016 Olympic Tournament
