= Oussama Methazem =

Algerian footballer (born 1993)

Personal information
- Date of birth: December 16, 1993 (age 32)
- Place of birth: Algeria
- Height: 1.80 m (5 ft 11 in)
- Position: Goalkeeper

Team information
- Current team: CA Bordj Bou Arréridj
- Number: 27

Youth career
- –2010: USM Khenchela

Senior career*
Years	Team	Apps	(Gls)
2010–2012	USM Khenchela		
2012–2015	CA Batna		
2015	RC Arbaâ		
2016–2017	MC El Eulma		
2017–2018	ASM Oran		
2018–2019	A Bou Saâda		
2019–2020	USM Khenchela		
2020–	CA Bordj Bou Arréridj		
- * Club domestic league appearances and goals as of October 25, 2020

Oussama Methazem (born December 16, 1993) is an Algerian goalkeeper who currently plays for the Algerian Ligue Professionnelle 1 Club CA Bordj Bou Arréridj.

== National team ==
Methazem participated in the 2016 Summer Olympics in Rio de Janeiro with the Algeria national under-23 football team. He played in the third match against the Portugal Olympic football team, which ended in a 1–1 draw.
