= Fernando Fonseca =

Portuguese footballer

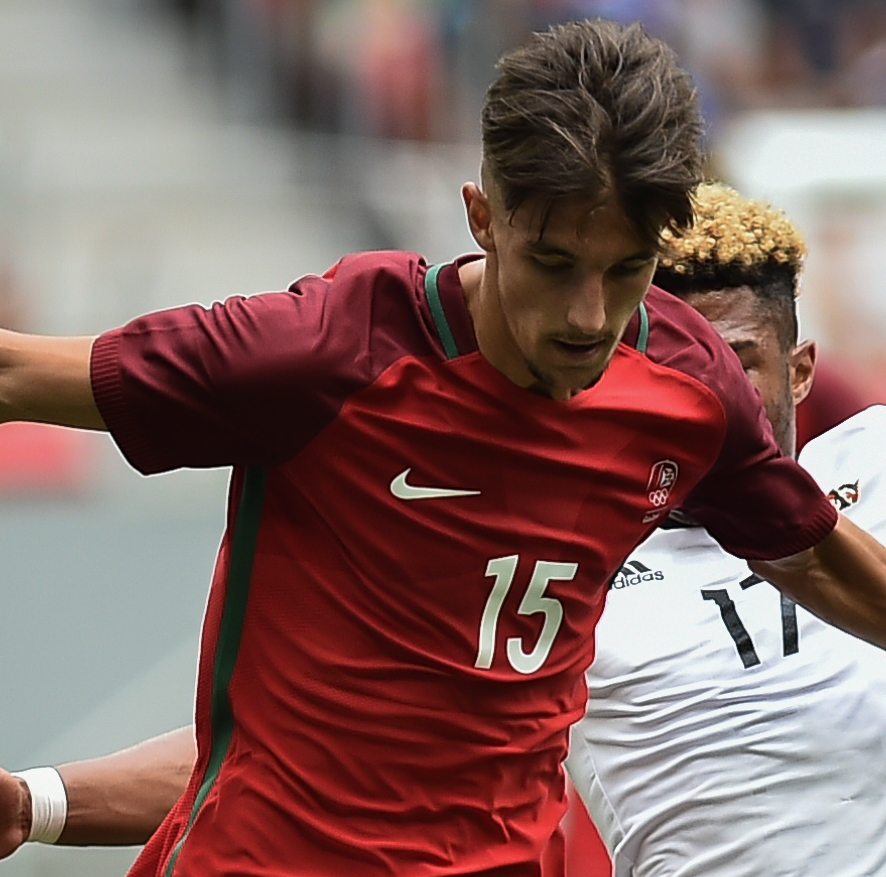
- Fonseca with Portugal at the 2016 Summer Olympics

Personal information
- Full name: Fernando Manuel Ferreira Fonseca
- Date of birth: 14 March 1997 (age 29)
- Place of birth: Porto, Portugal
- Height: 1.82 m (5 ft 11 1/2 in)
- Position: Right-back

Team information
- Current team: Leixões
- Number: 2

Youth career
- 2007–2009: Boavista
- 2009–2016: Porto
- 2012–2013: → Padroense (loan)

Senior career*
Years	Team	Apps	(Gls)
2016–2019	Porto B	32	(0)
2017	Porto	1	(0)
2017–2018	→ Estoril (loan)	19	(0)
2019–2020	Gil Vicente	20	(0)
2020–2023	Paços Ferreira	62	(0)
2023–2025	AVS	50	(0)
2026–	Leixões	7	(0)

International career
2014–2015	Portugal U18	7	(0)
2015	Portugal U19	6	(0)
2016–2018	Portugal U21	12	(0)
2016	Portugal U23	4	(0)
- * Club domestic league appearances and goals as of 00:52, 17 August 2026 (UTC)

Fernando Manuel Ferreira Fonseca (born 14 March 1997) is a Portuguese professional footballer who plays as a right-back for Liga Portugal 2 club Leixões.

== Club career ==
=== Porto ===
Born in Porto, Fonseca joined FC Porto's youth system in 2009, from neighbours Boavista FC. While at the service of the former's under-19 squad he won two consecutive national championships, under the guidance of former club player António Folha; his contribution was praised by the media, who described an enormous work capacity on the right flank and aggressiveness in ball disputes.

In the beginning of the 2016–17 season, Fonseca was promoted to the reserves by Luís Castro. His senior debut arrived on 24 August 2016, in a 2–1 home win against S.C. Olhanense in the Segunda Liga where he played the full 90 minutes. The following month he signed a contract extension until 2020, although no values of the termination clause were disclosed.

Fonseca played his first match in the Primeira Liga on 6 May 2017, profiting from the absence of the suspended Maxi Pereira and featuring the entire 1–1 away draw with C.S. Marítimo. For the following campaign, he was loaned to fellow top-division team G.D. Estoril Praia.

=== Gil Vicente ===
On 30 August 2019, Fonseca ended his decade-long link to Porto by signing for Gil Vicente F.C. as a replacement for Kellyton. He made his debut two weeks later, in a 2–0 loss at S.L. Benfica.

On 8 March 2020, Fonseca suffered a serious left ankle injury against C.D. Santa Clara, and had to wait for surgery due to the COVID-19 pandemic that had also postponed the top-flight season.

=== Paços Ferreira ===
Fonseca joined F.C. Paços de Ferreira on a three-year contract in September 2020. On 15 February 2023, he left by mutual consent.

=== AVS ===
On 8 July 2023, Fonseca agreed to a two-year deal with recently founded second-tier AVS Futebol SAD. When it expired, with the club by then in the main division, he left after failing to agree new terms.

=== Leixões ===
On 31 January 2026, the free agent Fonseca joined Leixões S.C. in the second tier.

== International career ==
Aged 19, Fonseca was selected by manager Rui Jorge for his 2016 Summer Olympics squad due to Fábio Sturgeon's injury. He was first-choice during the competition in Brazil, in an eventual quarter-final exit.

Fonseca earned his first cap for the under-21 side on 2 September 2016, in a 0–0 home draw against Israel in the 2017 UEFA European Under-21 Championship qualifiers.
