= Portugal Olympic football team =

Association football team representing Portugal at the Olympic Games

Portugal Olympic
- Nickname: Sub–23, Selecção Olímpica
- Association: Federação Portuguesa de Futebol
- Confederation: UEFA (Europe)
- Head coach: Rui Jorge
- Captain: Ricardo Esgaio
- FIFA code: POR
First colours	Second colours

Olympics
- Appearances: 4 (first in 1928)
- Best result: 4th (1996)
Medal record
Olympic Games
No medals won

The Portugal national under-23 football team (also known as Portugal Olympic football team) represents Portugal in international football competitions (final stage and qualifiers) in Olympic Games, as well as in under–23 football tournaments. The selection is limited to players under the age of 23, except three over-age players. The team is controlled by the Portuguese Football Federation (FPF). In three participations, Portugal's highest place was fourth, in 1996. This team also competed in the now-defunct Under-23 European Championship. The first time Portugal participated in the Olympic Football Tournament, they fielded main team players since the International Olympic Committee rules allowed to do so back then and in the 1980s, the team was composed of semi-professional players. The team currently qualifies in accordance to their under-21 team position in the UEFA European Under-21 Championship. The results below comprise both the under-23 team as well as the Olympic team. They won the world championships

== History ==
=== 1928 Summer Olympics in Amsterdam ===
Portugal was invited to enter the 1928 Summer Olympics Football Tournament, which was, at that time, contested by the best national "A" teams in the world and, therefore, considered to be the best international footballing tournament until the FIFA World Cup started, two years later, in 1930.

The Portuguese team was drawn in the preliminary round against Chile for a place in the first round. After falling 2–0 behind, Portugal scored four goals, winning the game 4–2 in what was their first win away from home soil. After their fantastic win against Chile, they faced off Yugoslavia and won 2–1 thanks to a late goal in the 90th minute.

Egypt was the team that followed in the quarter-finals. Here the Portuguese adventure ended after a 2–1 defeat. In the following games, the Egyptians lost against Argentina 6–0 in the semi-final and Italy 11–3 for the bronze medal match, which bittered the players. This was the first tournament the Portuguese team had ever competed in.

=== 1972 European U-23 qualifiers ===
Portugal was drawn to Group Five, along with Denmark, to play in a two-legged Play-off. After a 1–1 tie in Lisbon, the Portuguese lost the return leg in Aalborg 2–1, ending with a 3–2 aggregate result.

=== 1974 European U-23 qualifiers ===
For the next tournament, Portugal was put in Group Six with Bulgaria. The playoff result was 2–1 (0–0 in the first leg in Porto and 2–1 in Pleven) for the Bulgarians.

=== 1976 European U-23 qualifiers ===
With England and Czechoslovakia in Group One, Portugal ended second with three points (four less than England) coming from a win and a draw against the central Europeans (2–0 in Faro and 1–1 in Teplice). Both games against the English were loses (3–2 in Lisbon and 2–0 in London).

=== 1984 Summer Olympics qualifiers ===
Portugal was to play in Subgroup A of Group Four with Israel and West Germany for a place in the second qualifying round. They finished second behind the Germans (six points) with four points. After an initial win (3–1 in Lisbon), they lost in Osnabrück 3–0, followed by a 1–0 defeat in Tel Aviv and a 2–1 win against the Israelis in Lisbon.

=== 1988 Summer Olympics qualifiers ===
With strong sides to play with (East Germany, Iceland, Italy, and the Netherlands) the Portuguese qualification was seen has difficult. With wins against Iceland (2–1 in Leiria and 1–0 in Reykjavík), two away defeats (1–0 in Lecce, Italy and 3–0 in Aue, East Germany) and all other games tied, they ended up in third place with eight points (five behind group winners and qualifiers Italy).

=== 1996 Summer Olympics in Atlanta ===
Portugal participated in the Atlanta Games and after a win over Tunisia (2–0) and 1–1 draws against Argentina and the United States, they ended in second place in Group A with the same points and goal difference as the first-placed Argentinians (but with lesser goals scored). Then in the quarter-finals, a win over France (2–1) after extra-time assured them a place in the semi-finals. Once again, they played against Argentina, but this time the South Americans won 2–0. For the bronze medal match, they faced a strong Brazil full of world stars such as Bebeto, Roberto Carlos, Ronaldo, Rivaldo, among others. Portugal was heavily defeated by a score of 5–0. This participation remains to this day as their best ever performance with a fourth-place finish.

=== 2004 Summer Olympics in Athens ===
In the 2004 Games, the Portuguese were seen as major contenders for Olympic gold, but they didn't make it past the group stage. This disappointing performance started with a 4–2 defeat at the hands of Iraq. The second game ended in a 2–1 win over Morocco and in the third game, Portugal were once again defeated 4–2 by a minor team (Costa Rica).

== Competitive record ==
Gold medalists Silver medalists Bronze medalists

=== Summer Olympics ===
Summer Olympics										Qualification						
Year	Host	Round	Pld	W	D	L	F	A	Squad	Pos.	Pld	W	D	L	F	A
1908 to 1980		See Portugal national football team								See Portugal national football team						
1984	United States	Did not qualify								2nd	4	2	0	2	5	6
1988	South Korea	Did not qualify								3rd	8	2	4	2	4	6
1992	Spain	Did not qualify								See Portugal national under-21 football team						
1996	United States	Fourth place	6	2	2	2	6	10	Squad	See Portugal national under-21 football team						
2000	Australia	Did not qualify								See Portugal national under-21 football team						
2004	Greece	Group stage	3	1	0	2	6	9	Squad	See Portugal national under-21 football team						
2008	China	Did not qualify								See Portugal national under-21 football team						
2012	United Kingdom	Did not qualify								See Portugal national under-21 football team						
2016	Brazil	Quarter-finals	4	2	1	1	5	6	Squad	See Portugal national under-21 football team						
2020	Japan	Did not qualify								See Portugal national under-21 football team						
2024	France	Did not qualify								See Portugal national under-21 football team						
2028	United States	To be determined								See Portugal national under-21 football team						
Total		Fourth place	13	5	3	5	17	25	—	0/2	12	4	4	4	9	12

=== European U-23 Championship ===
- 1972: Did not qualify. Finished 2nd of 2 in qualification group.
- 1974: Did not qualify. Finished 2nd of 2 in qualification group.
- 1976: Did not qualify. Finished 2nd of 3 in qualification group.

== Players ==
=== Current squad ===
The following 18 players were selected to participate at the 2016 Summer Olympics.

The following is the Portugal squad in the men's football tournament of the 2016 Summer Olympics. The team of 18 players was officially named on 14 July. On 17 July, Pité replaced Nuno Santos. On 21 July, Fábio Sturgeon left the squad due to injury and was replaced by Fernando Fonseca.

Head coach: Rui Jorge

No.	Pos.	Player	Date of birth (age)	Caps	Goals	Club
1	GK	Bruno Varela	4 November 1994 (aged 21)	0	0	(Portuguese Football Federation) Vitória de Setúbal
2	DF	Ricardo Esgaio (c)	16 May 1993 (aged 23)	1	0	(Portuguese Football Federation) Sporting CP
3	DF	Tiago Ilori	28 October 1993 (aged 22)	1	0	(The Football Association) Liverpool
4	DF	Tobias Figueiredo	2 February 1994 (aged 22)	1	0	(Portuguese Football Federation) Nacional
5	DF	Edgar Ié	5 May 1994 (aged 22)	0	0	(Royal Spanish Football Federation) Villarreal B
6	MF	Tomás Podstawski	30 January 1995 (aged 21)	0	0	(Portuguese Football Federation) Porto B
7	MF	André Martins*	21 January 1990 (aged 26)	0	0	(Hellenic Football Federation) Olympiacos
8	MF	Sérgio Oliveira*	2 June 1992 (aged 24)	1	0	(Portuguese Football Federation) Porto
9	FW	Gonçalo Paciência	1 August 1994 (aged 22)	0	0	(Portuguese Football Federation) Porto
10	MF	Bruno Fernandes	8 September 1994 (aged 21)	1	0	(Italian Football Federation) Udinese
11	FW	Salvador Agra*	11 November 1991 (aged 24)	0	0	(Portuguese Football Federation) Nacional
12	GK	Joel Castro Pereira	28 June 1996 (aged 20)	0	0	(The Football Association) Manchester United
13	FW	Pité	22 August 1994 (aged 21)	0	0	(Portuguese Football Federation) Tondela
14	DF	Paulo Henrique	23 October 1996 (aged 19)	0	0	(Portuguese Football Federation) Paços de Ferreira
15	MF	Fernando Fonseca	14 March 1997 (aged 19)	0	0	(Portuguese Football Federation) Porto B
16	MF	Francisco Ramos	10 April 1995 (aged 21)	1	0	(Portuguese Football Federation) Chaves
17	FW	Carlos Mané	11 March 1994 (aged 22)	0	0	(Portuguese Football Federation) Sporting CP
18	MF	Tiago Silva	2 June 1993 (aged 23)	0	0	(Portuguese Football Federation) Feirense

* Over-aged player.

=== Previous squads ===
- 2016 Summer Olympics squads – Portugal
- 2004 Summer Olympics squads – Portugal
- 1996 Summer Olympics squads – Portugal
- 1928 Summer Olympics squads – Portugal

=== Overage players in Olympic Games ===
Tournament	Player 1	Player 2	Player 3
1996	Rui Bento (DF)	Paulo Alves (FW)	Capucho (FW)
2004	Nuno Frechaut (DF)	Fernando Meira (DF)	Boa Morte (FW)
2016	André Martins (MF)	Sérgio Oliveira (MF)	Salvador Agra (FW)
