= Marcelo Espinal =

Honduran footballer (born 1993)

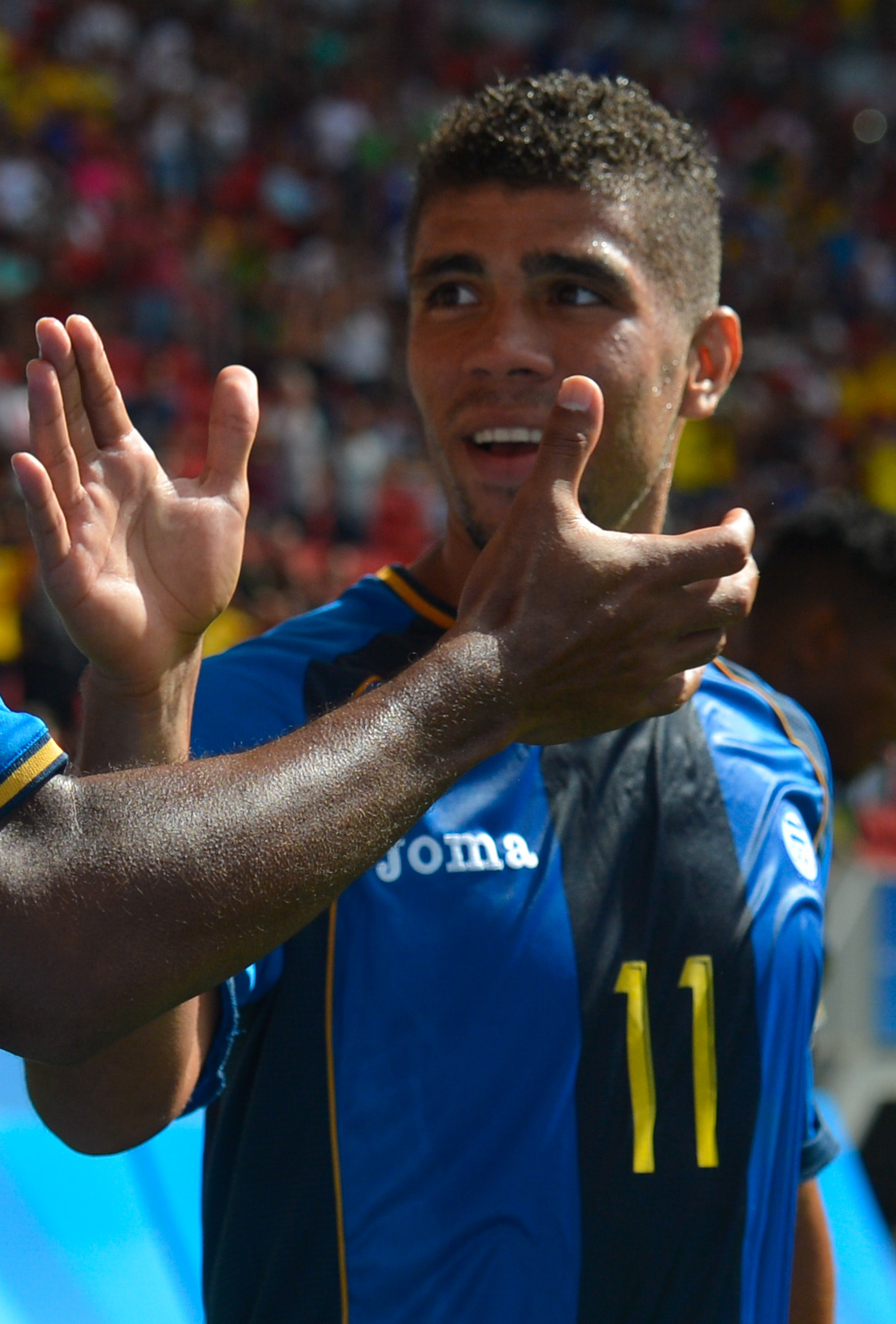
- Espinal with Honduras at the 2016 Summer Olympics

Personal information
- Full name: Rodolfo Marcelo Espinal Paniagua
- Date of birth: 24 February 1993 (age 33)
- Place of birth: La Ceiba, Honduras
- Height: 1.76 m (5 ft 9 in)
- Position: Defensive midfielder

Team information
- Current team: Victoria
- Number: 20

Senior career*
Years	Team	Apps	(Gls)
2011–2019	Vida	125	(1)
2019	Juticalpa	10	(0)
2019–	Victoria	155	(1)

International career^{‡}
2014	Honduras U20	5	(0)
2016	Honduras U23	5	(0)
- * Club domestic league appearances and goals as of 23 May 2026 ‡ National team caps and goals as of 19 June 2019

Rodolfo Marcelo Espinal Paniagua (born 24 February 1993) is a Honduran professional footballer who plays as a defensive midfielder for Liga de Ascenso club C.D. Victoria.
