= Gerónimo Rulli =

Argentine footballer (born 1992)

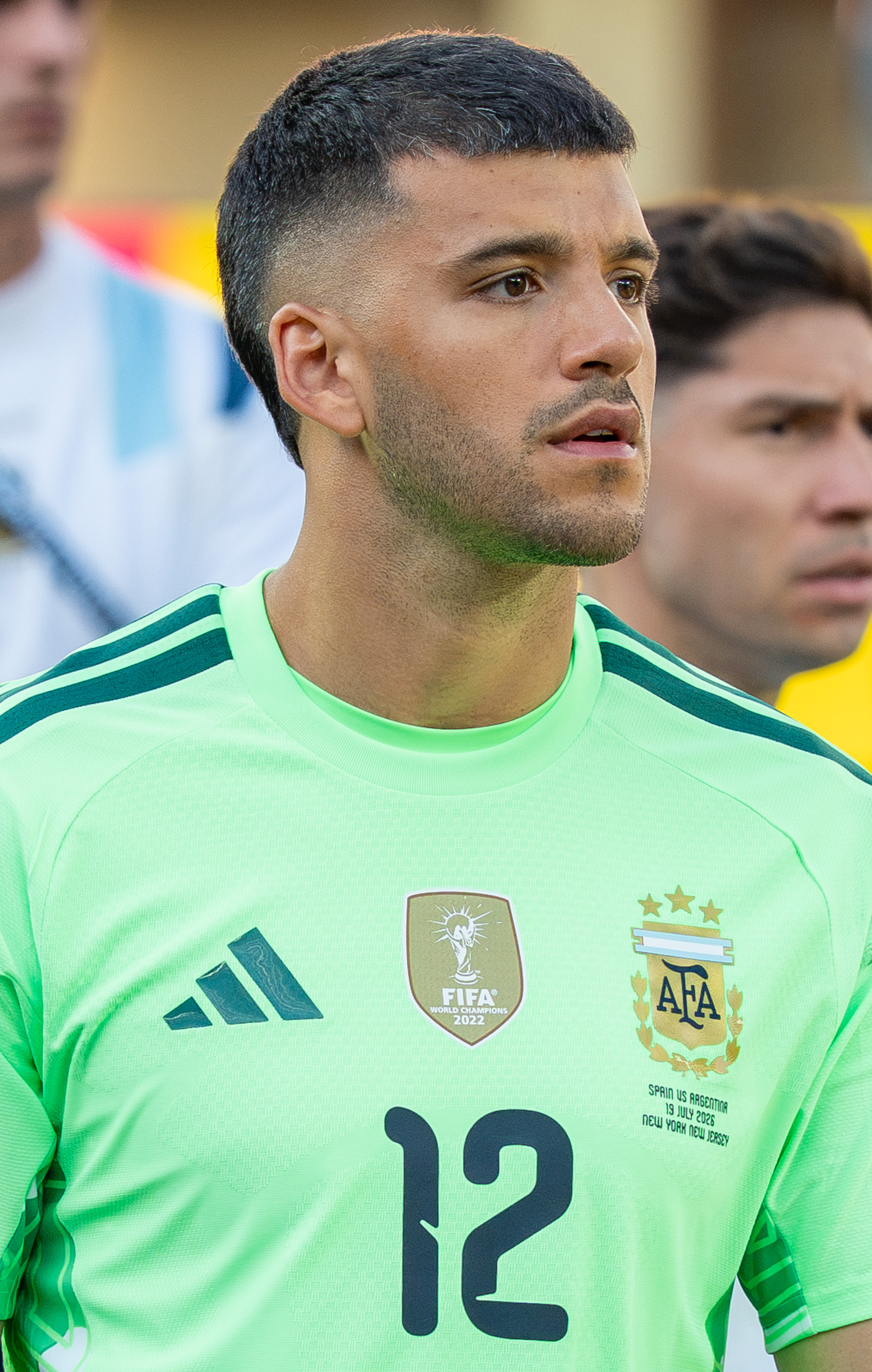
- Rulli with Argentina in 2026

Personal information
- Full name: Gerónimo Rulli
- Date of birth: 20 May 1992 (age 34)
- Place of birth: La Plata, Argentina
- Height: 1.89 m (6 ft 2 in)
- Position: Goalkeeper

Team information
- Current team: Manchester City
- Number: 28

Youth career
- 2009–2011: Estudiantes

Senior career*
Years	Team	Apps	(Gls)
2011–2014	Estudiantes	50	(0)
2014–2016	Deportivo Maldonado	0	(0)
2014–2016	→ Real Sociedad (loan)	58	(0)
2016–2017	Manchester City	0	(0)
2016–2017	→ Real Sociedad (loan)	38	(0)
2017–2020	Real Sociedad	53	(0)
2019–2020	→ Montpellier (loan)	25	(0)
2020–2023	Villarreal	47	(0)
2023–2024	Ajax	26	(0)
2023–2024	Jong Ajax	1	(0)
2024–2026	Marseille	63	(0)
2026–	Manchester City	0	(0)

International career^{‡}
2016–2024	Argentina Olympic (O.P.)	7	(0)
2018–	Argentina	10	(0)
Medal record
Men's football
Representing Argentina
FIFA World Cup
Winner	2022 Qatar
Runner-up	2026 Canada–Mexico–US
Copa América
Winner	2024 United States
CONMEBOL–UEFA Cup of Champions
Winner	2022 England
- * Club domestic league appearances and goals as of 21:58, 17 May 2026 (UTC) ‡ National team caps and goals as of 03:37, 15 November 2026 (UTC)

Gerónimo Rulli (Spanish pronunciation: [xeˈɾonimo ˈruli]; Italian: [ˈrulli]; born 20 May 1992) is an Argentine professional footballer who plays as a goalkeeper for Premier League club Manchester City and the Argentina national team.

Rulli joined Estudiantes's youth team in 2009, making his professional debut for them in 2013. Between 2014 and 2020, he played for Real Sociedad, twice on loan before joining them on a permanent deal in 2017. He played in 170 matches for the club in five seasons. He joined French club Montpellier on loan in 2019. In 2020, he joined Villarreal staying at the club for two-and-a-half seasons, winning the UEFA Europa League in 2021. In January 2023, he moved to Ajax for a reported fee of €8 million.

He featured for Argentina in the 2016 Olympic tournament in Brazil. He made his debut for the senior national team in 2018. Though he did not play any minutes, Rulli was a member of the Argentina squads that won the 2022 FIFA World Cup and the 2024 Copa América. Rulli also competed for Argentina at the 2024 Summer Olympics.

== Club career ==
=== Estudiantes ===
Born in La Plata, Buenos Aires Province, Rulli graduated from local Estudiantes' youth setup, being promoted to the first-team squad in 2012, being initially assigned as a backup to Justo Villar and Agustín Silva. On 8 April 2013, after profiting from Villar's departure to Nacional and Silva's injury, he played his first match as a professional, starting in a 0–1 loss at Arsenal de Sarandí.

Rulli appeared in further 11 matches during the campaign, and established a record of 588 minutes without suffering a goal. He appeared in all league matches in 2013–14, overtaking Silva in the pecking order.

=== Real Sociedad and loan to Montpellier ===
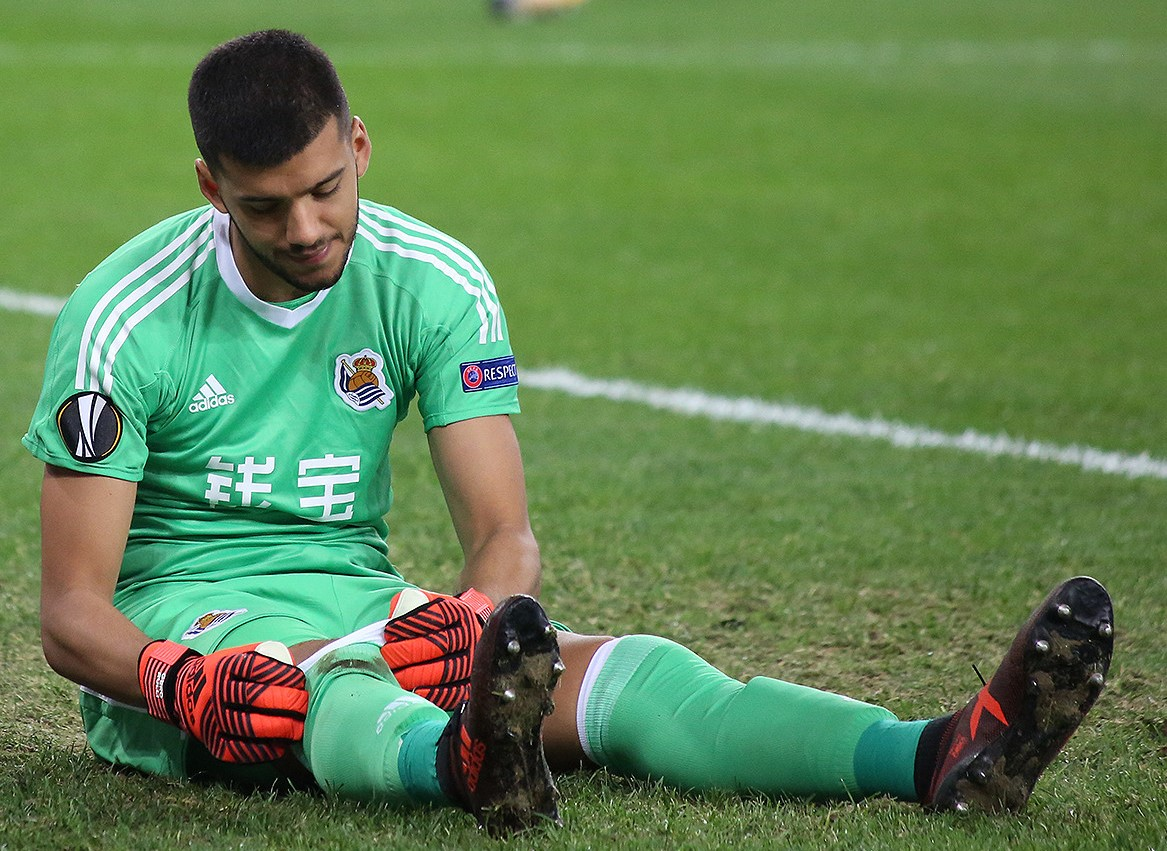
Rulli with Real Sociedad in 2017

On 24 July 2014, Rulli was loaned to La Liga's Real Sociedad for one year from Deportivo Maldonado, which bought the player's rights a month earlier. He made his debut for the club on 28 August, starting and being replaced in the 85th minute of a 0–3 away loss against Krasnodar in the 2014–15 UEFA Europa League due to an ankle injury.

Rulli returned to action in November, and made his debut in the main category of Spanish football on 20 December 2014, starting in a 1–1 away draw against Levante. On 4 January 2015, he made several key saves which granted the Txuri-urdin a 1–0 home win against Barcelona. On 4 July 2015, Rulli's loan was extended for a further year.

On 19 July 2016, Rulli was signed by Premier League side Manchester City for £4 million. He was shortly afterwards loaned back to Real Sociedad, before moving permanently in January 2017. On 14 August 2019, Rulli joined Ligue 1 club Montpellier on a season-long loan with the option to make the transfer permanent.

=== Villarreal ===
On 4 September 2020, after his loan ended with Montpellier, Rulli agreed to a four-year deal with Villarreal. In his first season, manager Unai Emery preferred to play Sergio Asenjo in goal in the league, and Rulli in the Europa League. He made his league debut for the club on 21 April in a 2–1 loss at Deportivo Alavés, having been chosen to prepare for the European semi-final against Arsenal.

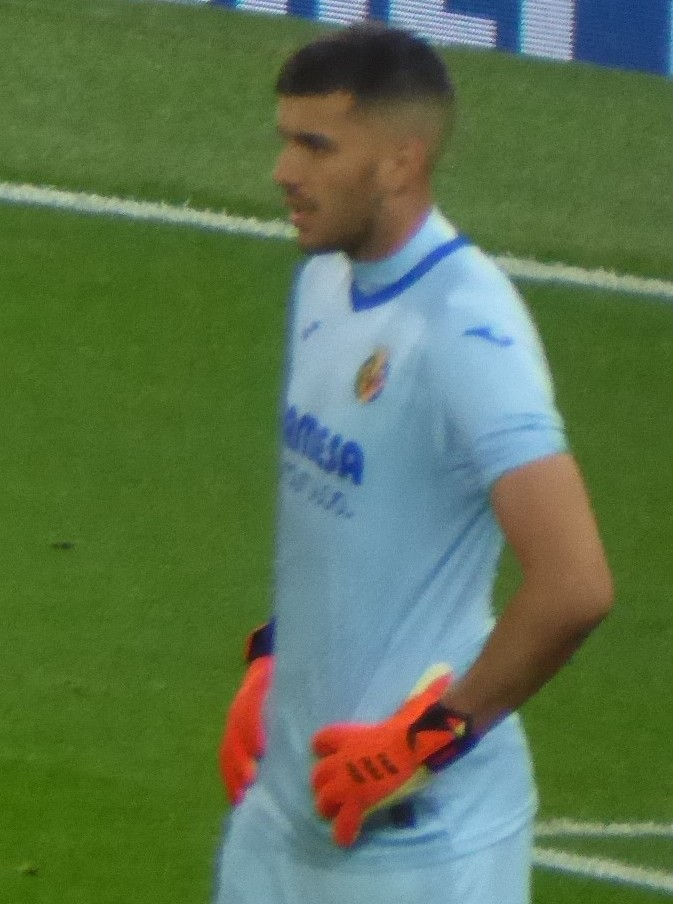
Rulli playing for Villarreal in 2021

On 26 May 2021, Rulli scored the winning penalty kick and then saved David de Gea's penalty in his side's 11–10 penalty shoot-out victory over Manchester United in the final of the 2020–21 UEFA Europa League after the game finished 1–1 at extra-time to win the first European title for Villarreal. In the second leg of the 2021–22 UEFA Champions League semi-finals, Villarreal was leading 2–0 against Liverpool in the first half to level the tie 2–2 on aggregate. In the second half, he made several goalkeeping mistakes and conceded three goals, in which his team eventually lost 3–2 in the Estadio de la Cerámica, and was knocked out of the competition.

=== Ajax ===
On 6 January 2023, Eredivisie side Ajax announced they had agreed the transfer of Rulli with Villarreal, signing the player on a three-and-a-half-year contract until 30 June 2026, with an option for an additional year. The clubs agreed on an initial transfer fee reported to be €8 million, with potential add-ons bringing the total value to €10 million.

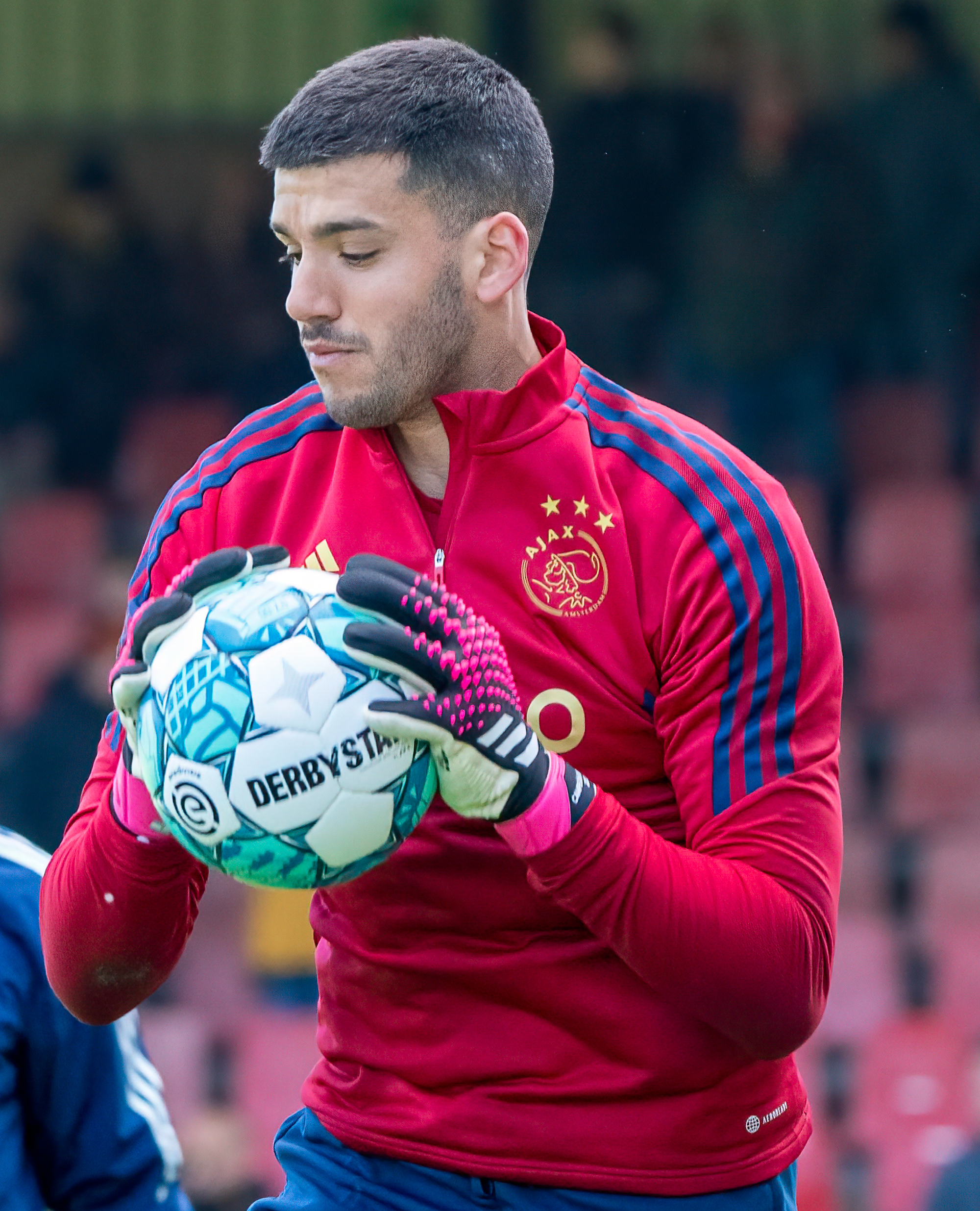
Rulli training with Ajax in 2023

Rulli made his debut for the club on 11 January 2023, keeping a clean sheet in a 2–0 KNVB Beker win against FC Den Bosch. Three days later, he made his Eredivisie debut in a 0–0 draw against Go Ahead Eagles. He quickly established himself as Ajax's primary goalkeeper under manager Alfred Schreuder and interim successor John Heitinga, making 19 league appearances during the second half of the 2022–23 season as Ajax finished third in the table.

On 12 August 2023, during Ajax's opening match of the 2023–24 season against Heracles Almelo, Rulli suffered a severe shoulder injury following a collision in the 25th minute, forcing him off the field. The injury required surgery, ruling him out for the remainder of the calendar year. During his recovery, Diant Ramaj established himself as Ajax's first-choice goalkeeper under interim manager John van 't Schip.

Rulli returned to match fitness in November 2023 and re-entered the starting line-up in April 2024 following an elbow injury to Ramaj. He featured in the final matches of the 2023–24 campaign, concluding his tenure at the club with 32 appearances across all competitions.

=== Marseille ===
On 11 August 2024, Rulli moved to Ligue 1 club Marseille on a three-year deal for a reported fee of €3 million. He made his debut six days later as the season began with a 5–1 win away to Brest and he saved a penalty from Romain Del Castillo; he played all 34 league games as his team finished as runners-up to rivals Paris Saint-Germain.

=== Return to Manchester City ===
On 12 August 2026, Rulli returned to Premier League club Manchester City, signing a two-year contract for a reported fee of £1.7 million. He made his debut on 17 September in the third round of the EFL Cup, a 5–0 home win over Norwich City; on 28 October, he played against Brighton & Hove Albion in the next round and saved penalties from Yasin Ayari and Lewis Dunk in the shootout as his team made the quarter-finals.

== International career ==
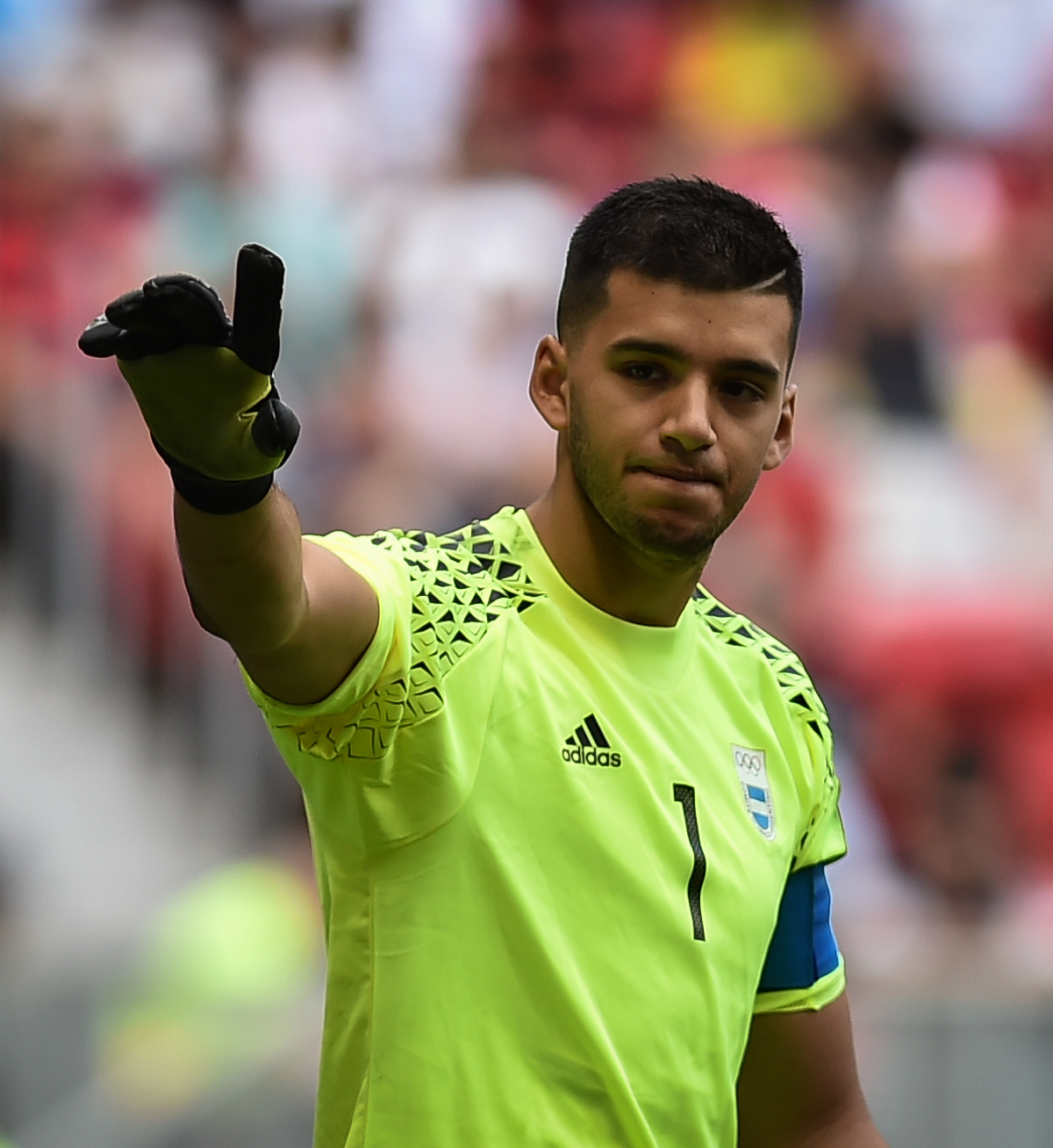
Rulli with Argentina at the 2016 Olympics

On 20 March 2015, Rulli was called up to the Argentina national team for the matches against El Salvador and Ecuador, but he did not play in either fixture. In 2016, Rulli was included in the preliminary squad for Copa América Centenario but was eventually excluded from the final squad.

Rulli was chosen as the overage player for the Argentina Olympic squad at the 2016 Olympic tournament in Brazil. He played all three games in a group stage elimination, and replaced the suspended Víctor Cuesta as captain in the last of those, a 1–1 draw with Honduras. After Jorge Sampaoli took charge in May 2017, Rulli was consistently called up to Argentina's senior squad, but did not play. Under manager Lionel Scaloni, he made his first team debut against Guatemala on 8 September 2018, in a 3–0 friendly win in Los Angeles.

On 1 June 2022, Rulli remained as an unused substitute as Argentina won 3–0 against reigning European Champions Italy at Wembley Stadium in the 2022 Finalissima.

Rulli was named in Scaloni's final 26-man Argentina squad for the 2022 FIFA World Cup in Qatar. He did not play a single minute in the tournament as Argentina won the World Cup by defeating France 4–2 in a penalty shoot-out to win the final, having initially tied 3–3.

In June 2024, Rulli was included in Scaloni's final 26-man Argentina squad for the 2024 Copa América. Again, he didn't play a single minute, since Emiliano Martínez was largely Argentina's first-choice keeper, and Argentina would go on to win the tournament after their 1–0 victory over Colombia.

After Martínez received a two-game suspension for Argentina, Rulli returned to serve as the starting goalkeeper for Argentina in October 2024 during 2026 FIFA World Cup qualification which saw him play during a 1–1 draw against Venezuela and a 6–0 win against Bolivia.

On 27 May 2026, Rulli was selected in the 26-man Argentine squad for the 2026 FIFA World Cup.

== Career statistics ==
=== Club ===
As of match played 17 September 2026

Appearances and goals by club, season and competition
Club	Season	League			National cup (Note: Includes Copa Argentina, Copa del Rey, Coupe de France, KNVB Cup, FA Cup)		League cup (Note: Includes EFL Cup)		Continental		Other		Total	
Club	Season	Division	Apps	Goals	Apps	Goals	Apps	Goals	Apps	Goals	Apps	Goals	Apps	Goals
Estudiantes	2011–12	Argentine Primera División	0	0	0	0	—		—		—		0	0
Estudiantes	2012–13	Argentine Primera División	12	0	3	0	—		—		—		15	0
Estudiantes	2013–14	Argentine Primera División	38	0	0	0	—		—		—		38	0
Estudiantes	Total		50	0	3	0	—		—		—		53	0
Real Sociedad (loan)	2014–15	La Liga	22	0	3	0	—		1 (Note: Appearance(s) in UEFA Europa League)	0	—		26	0
Real Sociedad (loan)	2015–16	La Liga	36	0	1	0	—		—		—		37	0
Real Sociedad (loan)	2016–17	La Liga	38	0	6	0	—		—		—		44	0
Real Sociedad	2017–18	La Liga	26	0	0	0	—		8	0	—		34	0
Real Sociedad	2018–19	La Liga	27	0	2	0	—		—		—		29	0
Real Sociedad	Real Sociedad total		149	0	12	0	—		9	0	—		170	0
Montpellier (loan)	2019–20	Ligue 1	25	0	3	0	0	0	—		—		28	0
Villarreal	2020–21	La Liga	2	0	5	0	—		13	0	—		20	0
Villarreal	2021–22	La Liga	31	0	2	0	—		12 (Note: Appearances in UEFA Champions League)	0	0	0	45	0
Villarreal	2022–23	La Liga	14	0	0	0	—		0	0	—		14	0
Villarreal	Total		47	0	7	0	—		25	0	0	0	79	0
Ajax	2022–23	Eredivisie	19	0	4	0	—		2	0	—		25	0
Ajax	2023–24	Eredivisie	7	0	0	0	—		0	0	—		7	0
Ajax	Total		26	0	4	0	—		2	0	—		32	0
Jong Ajax	2023–24	Eerste Divisie	1	0	—		—		—		—		1	0
Marseille	2024–25	Ligue 1	34	0	0	0	—		—		—		34	0
Marseille	2025–26	Ligue 1	29	0	1	0	—		8	0	1 (Note: Appearance in Trophée des Champions)	0	39	0
Marseille	Total		63	0	1	0	—		8	0	1	0	73	0
Manchester City	2026–27	Premier League	0	0	0	0	3	0	0	0	0	0	3	0
Career total			361	0	30	0	1	0	44	0	1	0	437	0

=== International ===
As of match played 15 November 2026

Appearances and goals by national team and year
National team	Year	Apps	Goals
Argentina	2018	2	0
Argentina	2019	0	0
Argentina	2020	0	0
Argentina	2021	0	0
Argentina	2022	2	0
Argentina	2023	0	0
Argentina	2024	2	0
Argentina	2025	1	0
Argentina	2026	3	0
Total		10	0

== Honours ==
Villarreal

- UEFA Europa League: 2020–21

Argentina

- FIFA World Cup: 2022
- Copa América: 2024
- CONMEBOL–UEFA Cup of Champions: 2022

Individual

- Ubaldo Fillol Award: 2014 Torneo Final
- UEFA Europa League Squad of the Season: 2020–21
