= Paulo Henrique (Portuguese footballer) =

Portuguese footballer

Personal information
- Full name: Paulo Henrique Rodrigues Cabral
- Date of birth: 23 October 1996 (age 30)
- Place of birth: Fenais da Luz, Portugal
- Height: 1.82 m (5 ft 11 1/2 in)
- Position: Left-back

Team information
- Current team: Marítimo
- Number: 23

Youth career
- 2006–2008: Marítimo P.D.
- 2008–2014: Santa Clara

Senior career*
Years	Team	Apps	(Gls)
2013–2015	Santa Clara	28	(1)
2015–2019	Paços Ferreira	5	(1)
2017–2018	→ Covilhã (loan)	35	(0)
2019–2021	Penafiel	55	(5)
2021–2024	Santa Clara	75	(2)
2024–2025	Radomiak Radom	25	(3)
2025–	Marítimo	29	(1)

International career
2014–2015	Portugal U19	9	(2)
2016	Portugal U20	5	(0)
2016	Portugal Olympic	1	(0)
- * Club domestic league appearances and goals as of 19 June 2026

Paulo Henrique Rodrigues Cabral (born 23 October 1996), simply known as Paulo Henrique, is a Portuguese professional footballer who plays as a left-back for Primeira Liga club Marítimo.

He played in the Primeira Liga for Paços de Ferreira and Santa Clara but spent most of his career in the second tier, making over 100 appearances for Santa Clara, Covilhã and Penafiel.

Paulo Henrique earned 15 caps for Portugal across all youth levels, and played for the Olympic team at the 2016 tournament.

== Club career ==
Born in Fenais da Luz, a civil parish of Ponta Delgada in the Azores, Paulo Henrique came through the youth ranks of local team Santa Clara. On 27 July 2013, he made his professional debut in a 2013–14 Taça da Liga match against Farense, when he started and played the full game. He played six Segunda Liga games over the season and scored the only goal of a home win over Sporting CP B on 29 January 2014.

On 3 July 2015, Paulo Henrique signed a four-year deal with Primeira Liga club Paços de Ferreira. He made two league appearances in his first season and scored on the latter, a 4–3 win at União da Madeira on 17 April 2016. After making no more appearances, he moved to Sporting da Covilhã in the second division on a season's loan on 17 August 2017.

Having made just three appearances as Paços won the second division title in 2018–19, Paulo Henrique's contract with the Castores expired and he signed a one-year deal with Penafiel in that league.

In June 2021, Paulo Henrique returned to Santa Clara on a three-year deal, with the team now in the top flight.

On 26 August 2024, he made his first career move abroad, joining several compatriots at Polish top division club Radomiak Radom on a two-year contract.

On 1 July 2025, without Radomiak's knowledge or approval, Paulo Henrique returned to Portugal to join Liga Portugal 2 club Marítimo on a two-year deal.

== International career ==
Paulo Henrique took part with the Portugal under-19 team in 2015 UEFA European Championship qualification, scoring in a 4–1 win over Albania on 14 November 2014 and a 6–1 win over Turkey the following 29 May. He was also selected for the under-20 team that came third at the Toulon Tournament in 2016; he missed in the penalty shootout that his team won against the Czech Republic.

Manager Rui Jorge called up Paulo Henrique as the final name for the Olympic team's entry at the 2016 tournament in Brazil. His one appearance for the quarter-finalists was the final group game on 10 August at the Mineirão, playing the entirety of a 1–1 draw with Algeria.
