= Chico Ramos =

Portuguese footballer

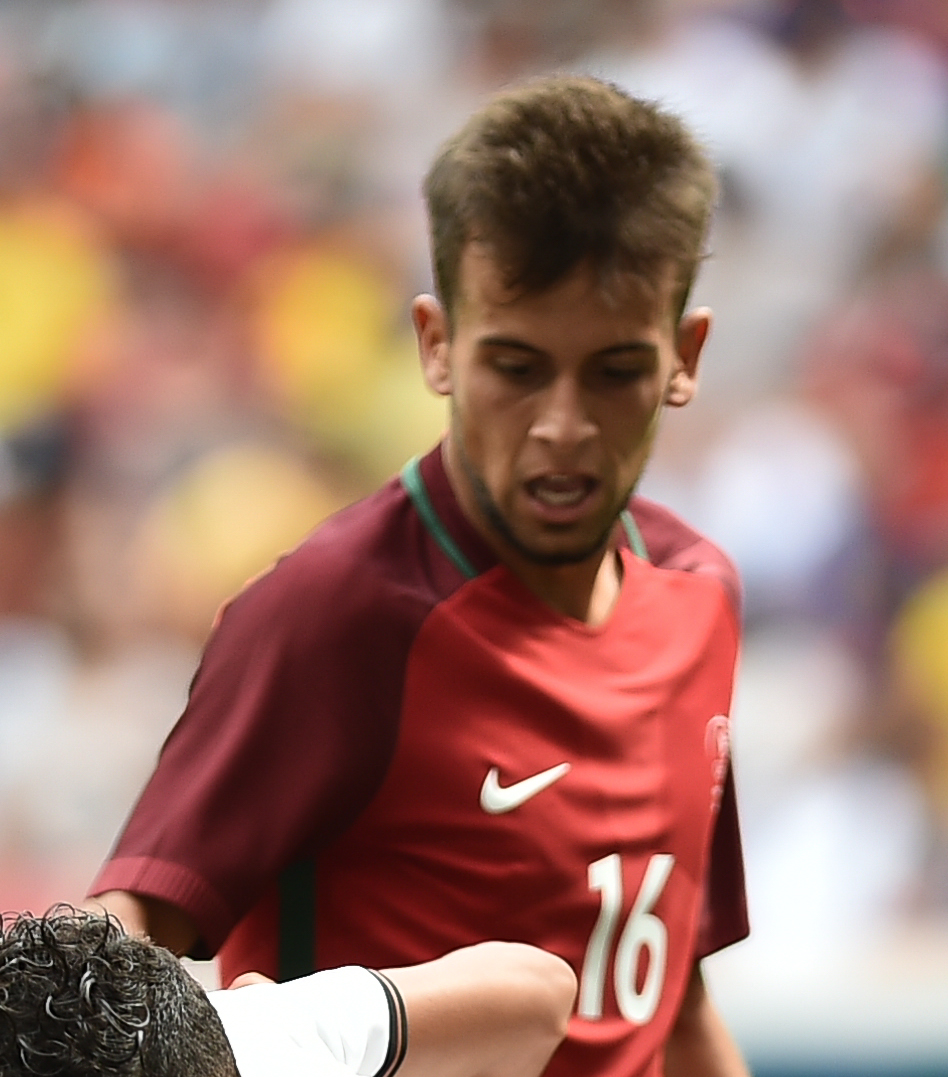
- Ramos playing for Portugal at the 2016 Olympics

Personal information
- Full name: Francisco Augusto Neto Ramos
- Date of birth: 10 April 1995 (age 31)
- Place of birth: Póvoa de Varzim, Portugal
- Height: 1.85 m (6 ft 1 in)
- Position: Midfielder

Team information
- Current team: Paços Ferreira
- Number: 88

Youth career
- 2003–2008: Varzim
- 2008–2014: Porto
- 2010–2011: → Padroense (loan)

Senior career*
Years	Team	Apps	(Gls)
2014–2017	Porto B	101	(6)
2016–2017	Porto	3	(0)
2017–2020	Vitória Guimarães	14	(0)
2019–2020	→ Santa Clara (loan)	41	(0)
2020–2023	Nacional	55	(3)
2023–2025	Radomiak	27	(0)
2025–	Paços Ferreira	32	(0)

International career
2010–2011	Portugal U16	12	(2)
2011–2012	Portugal U17	8	(0)
2012–2013	Portugal U18	9	(0)
2013–2014	Portugal U19	24	(2)
2014–2015	Portugal U20	9	(0)
2015–2017	Portugal U21	6	(0)
2016	Portugal U23	4	(0)
Medal record
Men's football
Representing Portugal
UEFA European Under-19 Championship
Runner-up	2014 Hungary
- * Club domestic league appearances and goals as of 19:44, 21 May 2026 (UTC)

Francisco 'Chico' Augusto Neto Ramos (born 10 April 1995) is a Portuguese professional footballer who plays as a midfielder for Liga 3 club Paços de Ferreira.

== Club career ==
=== Porto ===
Born in Póvoa de Varzim, Ramos joined FC Porto's youth system at the age of 13, from local club Varzim SC. He made his senior debut with the former's B team, going on to spend several seasons with them in the Segunda Liga.

Ramos' maiden appearance with the main squad took place on 20 January 2016, in a 1–0 away loss against F.C. Famalicão in the group stage of the Taça da Liga. His first game in the Primeira Liga occurred on 12 March, as he came as an 88th-minute substitute for Vincent Aboubakar in the 3–2 home win over C.F. União.

Ramos was supposed to join G.D. Chaves on loan for the 2016–17 campaign. Following a left-foot injury contracted during the Summer Olympics, however, the move was aborted.

=== Vitória Guimarães ===
On 30 June 2017, Ramos signed a contract with Vitória de Guimarães. He spent the better part of the following two seasons on loan to C.D. Santa Clara, also of the Portuguese top division.

=== Nacional ===
On 28 September 2020, Ramos joined C.D. Nacional on a three-year deal. The following 30 January, he scored his first top-flight goal to decide a 2–1 home victory over F.C. Famalicão; the season ended in relegation.

=== Radomiak ===
On 12 January 2023, Ramos agreed to a two-and-a-half-year contract with Radomiak Radom in the Polish Ekstraklasa. On 15 April, during an away match against KS Cracovia, he suffered a right leg fracture after an unsuccessful challenge on Takuto Oshima.

=== Later career ===
Ramos returned to Portugal for the 2025–26 season, with the 30-year-old signing a three-year deal with second-tier side F.C. Paços de Ferreira.

== International career ==
Ramos represented Portugal at the 2015 FIFA U-20 World Cup. He played all the matches save one in New Zealand, helping his country to reach the quarter-finals.

Ramos won his first cap for the under-21 side on 12 November 2015, featuring the second 45 minutes of the 4–0 victory against Albania in Arouca for the 2017 UEFA European Under-21 Championship qualifiers.

== Career statistics ==
As of match played 24 May 2025

Appearances and goals by club, season and competition
Club	Season	League			National cup (Note: Includes Taça de Portugal)		League cup (Note: Includes Taça da Liga)		Other		Total	
Club	Season	Division	Apps	Goals	Apps	Goals	Apps	Goals	Apps	Goals	Apps	Goals
Porto B	2014–15	Segunda Liga	38	3	0	0	0	0	0	0	38	3
Porto B	2015–16	Segunda Liga	38	2	0	0	0	0	0	0	38	2
Porto B	2016–17	Segunda Liga	25	1	0	0	0	0	0	0	25	1
Porto B	Total		101	6	0	0	0	0	0	0	101	6
Porto	2015–16	Primeira Liga	3	0	0	0	1	0	0	0	4	0
Vitória Guimarães	2017–18	Primeira Liga	14	0	2	0	2	0	5 (Note: Appearances in UEFA Europa League)	0	23	0
Vitória Guimarães	2018–19	Primeira Liga	0	0	1	0	0	0	0	0	1	0
Vitória Guimarães	Total		14	0	3	0	2	0	5	0	24	0
Santa Clara (loan)	2018–19	Primeira Liga	12	0	0	0	0	0	—		12	0
Santa Clara (loan)	2019–20	Primeira Liga	29	0	3	0	1	0	—		33	0
Santa Clara (loan)	Total		41	0	3	0	1	0	—		45	0
Nacional	2020–21	Primeira Liga	16	1	2	0	0	0	—		18	1
Nacional	2021–22	Liga Portugal 2	32	2	1	0	1	0	—		34	2
Nacional	2022–23	Liga Portugal 2	7	0	3	0	3	0	—		13	0
Nacional	Total		55	3	6	0	4	0	—		65	3
Radomiak	2022–23	Ekstraklasa	9	0	—		—		—		9	0
Radomiak	2023–24	Ekstraklasa	0	0	0	0	—		—		0	0
Radomiak	2024–25	Ekstraklasa	18	0	0	0	—		—		18	0
Radomiak	Total		27	0	0	0	—		—		27	0
Career total			241	9	12	0	8	0	5	0	266	9

== Honours ==
Porto B

- LigaPro: 2015–16
