= 2016–17 UC Sampdoria season =

Sampdoria
2016–17 season
- President: Massimo Ferrero
- Manager: Marco Giampaolo
- Stadium: Stadio Luigi Ferraris
- Serie A: 10th
- Coppa Italia: Round of 16
- Top goalscorer: League: Fabio Quagliarella (12); All: Luis Muriel, Patrik Schick (13)
- Highest home attendance: 29,824 vs Genoa (22 October 2016, Serie A)
- Lowest home attendance: 4,479 vs Cagliari (30 November 2016, Coppa Italia)
- Average home league attendance: 19,852
Home colours	Away colours	Third colours

The 2016–17 season was Unione Calcio Sampdoria's 60th season in Serie A, and their 5th consecutive season in the top-flight. Sampdoria competed in Serie A, finishing 10th, and in the Coppa Italia, where the club was eliminated in the round of 16 by Roma.

== Players ==
=== Squad information ===
As of 3 February 2017

Note: Flags indicate national team as defined under FIFA eligibility rules; some limited exceptions apply. Players may hold more than one non-FIFA nationality.

No.	Pos.	Nation	Player
1	GK	ITA	Christian Puggioni
2	GK	ITA	Emiliano Viviano
3	DF	NGA	Stanley Amuzie
4	DF	CRO	Lorenco Šimić
5	DF	BRA	Dodô
8	MF	PAR	Édgar Barreto
9	FW	COL	Luis Muriel
10	MF	POR	Bruno Fernandes
11	MF	ARG	Ricky Álvarez
12	GK	LTU	Titas Krapikas
14	FW	CZE	Patrik Schick
16	MF	POL	Karol Linetty
17	MF	ITA	Angelo Palombo (captain)

No.	Pos.	Nation	Player
18	MF	BEL	Dennis Praet
19	DF	ITA	Vasco Regini
20	DF	SUI	Daniel Pavlović
21	MF	ITA	Luca Cigarini
22	MF	ITA	Jacopo Sala
23	MF	SRB	Filip Đuričić
24	DF	POL	Bartosz Bereszyński
26	DF	ARG	Matías Silvestre
27	FW	ITA	Fabio Quagliarella
34	MF	URU	Lucas Torreira
37	DF	SVK	Milan Škriniar
47	FW	CRO	Ante Budimir

== Transfers ==
=== In ===
Date	Pos.	Player	Age	Moving from	Fee	Notes	Source
24 June 2016	FW	(Croatia) Ante Budimir	24	(Italy) Crotone	€1.8M		
13 July 2016	FW	(Czech Republic) Patrik Schick	20	(Czech Republic) Sparta Prague	€4M		
19 July 2016	DF	(Switzerland) Daniel Pavlović	28	(Switzerland) Grasshopper	Free		
20 July 2016	MF	(Italy) Luca Cigarini	30	(Italy) Atalanta	€3.5M		
29 July 2016	MF	(Poland) Karol Linetty	21	(Poland) Lech Poznań	€3.2M		
16 August 2016	MF	(Portugal) Bruno Fernandes	21	(Italy) Udinese	€6M	1-year loan with obligation to buy	
24 August 2016	MF	(Belgium) Dennis Praet	22	(Belgium) Anderlecht	€10M		
4 January 2017	DF	(Poland) Bartosz Bereszyński	24	(Poland) Legia Warsaw	€2M		
31 January 2017	DF	(Croatia) Lorenco Šimić	21	(Croatia) Hajduk Split	€1.4M		

==== Loans in ====
Date	Pos.	Player	Age	Moving from	Fee	Notes	Source
18 August 2016	DF	(Brazil) Dodô	24	(Italy) Internazionale	Loan	2-year loan with an option to buy	

=== Out ===
Date	Pos.	Player	Age	Moving to	Fee	Notes	Source
22 June 2016	MF	(Poland) Paweł Wszołek	24	(Italy) Hellas Verona	Undisclosed		
9 July 2016	DF	(Finland) Niklas Moisander	30	(Germany) Werder Bremen	€1.8M		
12 July 2016	MF	(Argentina) Joaquín Correa	21	(Spain) Sevilla	€13M		
13 July 2016	FW	(Italy) Gianluca Sansone	29	(Italy) Novara	Undisclosed		
18 July 2016	MF	(Brazil) Fernando	24	(Russia) Spartak Moscow	€12.5M		
18 July 2016	MF	(Serbia) Nenad Krstičić	26	Free agent			
26 July 2016	DF	(Italy) Mattia Cassani	32	(Italy) Bari	Undisclosed		
2 August 2016	MF	(Italy) Roberto Soriano	25	(Spain) Villarreal	€14.1M		
18 August 2016	DF	(Italy) Lorenzo De Silvestri	28	(Italy) Torino	€3.6M		
3 January 2017	MF	(Italy) Mirko Eramo	27	(Italy) Benevento	Undisclosed		

==== Loans out ====
Date	Pos.	Player	Age	Moving to	Fee	Notes	Source

== Competitions ==
=== Serie A ===
==== League table ====
Pos	Team	Pld	W	D	L	GF	GA	GD	Pts
8	Fiorentina	38	16	12	10	63	57	+6	60
9	Torino	38	13	14	11	71	66	+5	53
10	Sampdoria	38	12	12	14	49	55	−6	48
11	Cagliari	38	14	5	19	55	76	−21	47
12	Sassuolo	38	13	7	18	58	63	−5	46

Source: Serie A, Soccerway
Rules for classification: 1) Points; 2) Head-to-head points; 3) Head-to-head goal difference; 4) Goal difference; 5) Goals scored; 6) Draw.

==== Results summary ====
Overall								Home						Away					
Pld	W	D	L	GF	GA	GD	Pts	W	D	L	GF	GA	GD	W	D	L	GF	GA	GD
38	12	12	14	49	55	−6	48	8	6	5	28	23	+5	4	6	9	21	32	−11

Last updated: 28 May 2017.
Source: Competitive matches

==== Results by round ====
Round	1	2	3	4	5	6	7	8	9	10	11	12	13	14	15	16	17	18	19	20	21	22	23	24	25	26	27	28	29	30	31	32	33	34	35	36	37	38
Ground	A	H	A	H	A	A	H	A	H	A	H	A	H	A	H	H	A	H	A	H	A	H	A	H	H	A	H	A	H	A	H	A	H	A	A	H	A	H
Result	W	W	L	L	L	L	D	D	W	L	W	D	W	D	W	L	L	D	L	D	L	W	W	W	D	D	W	W	L	W	D	L	L	D	L	D	D	L
Position	7	2	5	9	12	17	15	15	15	16	14	14	11	11	9	11	13	13	13	13	16	12	10	10	10	10	10	9	9	9	9	9	10	10	10	10	10	10

Updated to match(es) played on 28 May 2017. Source: Competitive matches
A = Away; H = Home; W = Win; D = Draw; L = Loss

==== Matches ====
21 August 2016 1	Empoli	0–1	Sampdoria	Empoli
20:45 CEST (UTC+02:00)	Büchel (yellow card) 77'; Maccarone (red card) 84'; Saponara (yellow card) 86'	Report	Muriel 37'; Linetty (yellow card) 61'; Barreto (yellow card) 68'; Pavlović (yellow card) 75'; Viviano (yellow card) 83'	Stadium: Stadio Carlo Castellani; Attendance: 8,047; Referee: Maurizio Mariani

28 August 2016 2	Sampdoria	2–1	Atalanta	Genoa
20:45 CEST (UTC+02:00)	Quagliarella 35' (pen.); Barreto 45'; Pavlović (yellow card) 90+1'	Report	Carmona (yellow card) 21' (yellow-red card) 42'; Kessié 27', (yellow card) 40'; Raimondi (yellow card) 34'; Kurtić (yellow card) 62'; Gómez (yellow card) 85'	Stadium: Stadio Luigi Ferraris; Attendance: 19,045; Referee: Daniele Doveri

11 September 2016 3	Roma	3–2	Sampdoria	Rome
15:00 CEST (UTC+02:00)	Salah 8'; Džeko 61'; De Rossi (yellow card) 70'; Juan Jesus (yellow card) 78'; Totti 90+3' (pen.), (yellow card) 90+4'	Report	Muriel 18'; Quagliarella 41'; Sala (yellow card) 63'; Álvarez (yellow card) 90+3' (red card) 90+3'	Stadium: Stadio Olimpico; Attendance: 27,630; Referee: Piero Giacomelli
Note: The match was interrupted for 80 minutes during half-time due to rain.

16 September 2016 4	Sampdoria	0–1	Milan	Genoa
20:45 CEST (UTC+02:00)	Pereira (yellow card) 71'; Muriel (yellow card) 84'	Report	Lapadula (yellow card) 39'; Bonaventura (yellow card) 47'; Bacca 85'; Donnarumma (yellow card) 90+6'	Stadium: Stadio Luigi Ferraris; Attendance: 19,708; Referee: Massimiliano Irrati

21 September 2016 5	Bologna	2–0	Sampdoria	Bologna
18:30 CEST (UTC+02:00)	Verdi (yellow card) 27', (goal) 45'; Destro 50'; Di Francesco (red card) 90+2'	Report	Pereira (yellow card) 67'; Barreto (red card) 69'; Praet (yellow card) 87'; Linetty (yellow card) 89'	Stadium: Stadio Renato Dall'Ara; Attendance: 16,998; Referee: Piero Giacomelli

26 September 2016 6	Cagliari	2–1	Sampdoria	Cagliari
20:45 CEST (UTC+02:00)	João Pedro 37'; Isla (yellow card) 69'; Melchiorri 88'; Padoin (yellow card) 90+1'	Report	Muriel (yellow card) 19'; Škriniar (yellow card) 49'; Cigarini (yellow card) 65'; Fernandes 86'	Stadium: Stadio Sant'Elia; Attendance: 14,117; Referee: Claudio Gavillucci

2 October 2016 7	Sampdoria	1–1	Palermo	Genoa
15:00 CEST (UTC+02:00)	Álvarez (yellow card) 21'; Viviano (yellow card) 60'; Fernandes 90+5'	Report	Hiljemark (yellow card) 28'; Gazzi (yellow card) 46' (yellow-red card) 90+2'; González (yellow card) 52'; Nestorovski 60', (yellow card) 61'; Diamanti (yellow card) 75'; Posavec (yellow card) 82'	Stadium: Stadio Luigi Ferraris; Attendance: 18,093; Referee: Maurizio Mariani

15 October 2016 8	Pescara	1–1	Sampdoria	Pescara
18:00 CEST (UTC+02:00)	Campagnaro 23'; Coda (yellow card) 30' (yellow-red card) 45'; Aquilani (yellow card) 39'	Report	Campagnaro 12' (o.g.); Viviano (yellow card) 76'	Stadium: Stadio Adriatico – Giovanni Cornacchia; Attendance: 13,307; Referee: Domenico Celi

22 October 2016 9	Sampdoria	2–1	Genoa	Genoa
18:00 CEST (UTC+02:00)	Muriel 12'; Izzo 47' (o.g.); Linetty (yellow card) 49'; Puggioni (yellow card) 79'	Report	Rigoni 24'; Perin (yellow card) 45+1'; Orbán (yellow card) 56'; Laxalt (yellow card) 68'	Stadium: Stadio Luigi Ferraris; Attendance: 29,824; Referee: Paolo Tagliavento

26 October 2016 10	Juventus	4–1	Sampdoria	Turin
20:45 CEST (UTC+02:00)	Mandžukić 4'; Chiellini 9', 87'; Pjanić 65'	Report	Silvestre (yellow card) 42'; Schick 57'; Barreto (yellow card) 62'; Cigarini (yellow card) 89'	Stadium: Juventus Stadium; Attendance: 38,417; Referee: Carmine Russo

30 October 2016 11	Sampdoria	1–0	Internazionale	Genoa
20:45 CET (UTC+01:00)	Quagliarella 44'; Sala (yellow card) 84'	Report	Ansaldi (yellow card) 74'; Miranda (yellow card) 75'; João Mário (yellow card) 83'	Stadium: Stadio Luigi Ferraris; Attendance: 20,906; Referee: Paolo Mazzoleni

6 November 2016 12	Fiorentina	1–1	Sampdoria	Florence
18:00 CET (UTC+01:00)	Bernardeschi 37'; Gonzalo (yellow card) 45'; Milić (yellow card) 62'; Badelj (yellow card) 71'	Report	Fernandes (yellow card) 54'; Muriel 57'; Pereira (yellow card) 90+3'	Stadium: Stadio Artemio Franchi; Attendance: 23,559; Referee: Nicola Rizzoli

20 November 2016 13	Sampdoria	3–2	Sassuolo	Genoa
12:30 CET (UTC+01:00)	Sala (yellow card) 18'; Škriniar (yellow card) 30'; Silvestre (yellow card) 52'; Torreira (yellow card) 76'; Quagliarella 84'; Muriel 85', 90+1' (pen.)	Report	Antei (yellow card) 21'; Missiroli (yellow card) 53'; Peluso (yellow card) 62'; Ricci 64'; Ragusa 74'	Stadium: Stadio Luigi Ferraris; Attendance: 20,052; Referee: Daniele Doveri

27 November 2016 14	Crotone	1–1	Sampdoria	Crotone
15:00 CET (UTC+01:00)	Rosi (yellow card) 5'; Trotta (yellow card) 37'; Falcinelli 43'; Ferrari (yellow card) 90+4'	Report	Fernandes 71'	Stadium: Stadio Ezio Scida; Attendance: 7,508; Referee: Fabio Maresca

4 December 2016 15	Sampdoria	2–0	Torino	Genoa
15:00 CET (UTC+01:00)	Barreto (yellow card) 29', (goal) 51'; Schick 90+5'	Report	Rossettini (yellow card) 22'; Benassi (yellow card) 58'; Barreca (yellow card) 58'; Baselli (yellow card) 72'	Stadium: Stadio Luigi Ferraris; Attendance: 19,279; Referee: Daniele Orsato

10 December 2016 16	Sampdoria	1–2	Lazio	Genoa
20:45 CET (UTC+01:00)	Regini (yellow card) 53'; Schick 89', (yellow card) 90+2'	Report	Milinković-Savić 40'; Parolo 44', (yellow card) 90'; Radu (yellow card) 48'; Biglia (yellow card) 58'; Wallace (yellow card) 72'	Stadium: Stadio Luigi Ferraris; Attendance: 18,829; Referee: Carmine Russo

18 December 2016 17	Chievo	2–1	Sampdoria	Verona
15:00 CET (UTC+01:00)	Meggiorini 9'; Pellissier 42' (pen.); Spolli (yellow card) 61'	Report	Regini (yellow card) 18'; Puggioni (yellow card) 41'; Schick 90+3'	Stadium: Stadio Marc'Antonio Bentegodi; Attendance: 10,000; Referee: Maurizio Mariani

22 December 2016 18	Sampdoria	0–0	Udinese	Genoa
20:45 CET (UTC+01:00)	Muriel (yellow card) 38'	Report	Faraoni (yellow card) 57'	Stadium: Stadio Luigi Ferraris; Attendance: 17,526; Referee: Claudio Gavillucci

7 January 2017 19	Napoli	2–1	Sampdoria	Naples
20:45 CET (UTC+01:00)	Hysaj (yellow card) 69'; Gabbiadini 77'; Tonelli 90+5'	Report	Hysaj 30' (o.g.); Silvestre (yellow card) 54' (yellow-red card) 61'	Stadium: Stadio San Paolo; Attendance: 29,870; Referee: Marco Di Bello

15 January 2017 20	Sampdoria	0–0	Empoli	Genoa
15:00 CET (UTC+01:00)	Palombo (yellow card) 29'; Pereira (yellow card) 38'; Linetty (yellow card) 39'	Report	Ćosić (yellow card) 39'; Dioussé (yellow card) 89'; Mchedlidze (yellow card) 90'	Stadium: Stadio Luigi Ferraris; Attendance: 19,056; Referee: Domenico Celi

22 January 2017 21	Atalanta	1–0	Sampdoria	Bergamo
18:00 CET (UTC+01:00)	Gómez 55' (pen.); Kurtić (yellow card) 74'	Report	Pereira (yellow card) 29'; Đuričić (yellow card) 81'; Škriniar (yellow card) 89'	Stadium: Stadio Atleti Azzurri d'Italia; Attendance: 15,614; Referee: Nicola Rizzoli

29 January 2017 22	Sampdoria	3–2	Roma	Genoa
15:00 CET (UTC+01:00)	Praet 21'; Torreira (yellow card) 29'; Puggioni (yellow card) 60'; Schick 71'; Muriel 73'	Report	Peres 5'; Vermaelen (yellow card) 51'; Džeko 66'; Rüdiger (yellow card) 72'; Totti (yellow card) 90+1'	Stadium: Stadio Luigi Ferraris; Attendance: 19,799; Referee: Paolo Mazzoleni

5 February 2017 23	Milan	0–1	Sampdoria	Milan
12:30 CET (UTC+01:00)	Bacca (yellow card) 45'; Suso (yellow card) 60'; Kucka (yellow card) 63'; Sosa (yellow card) 85' (yellow-red card) 90'	Report	Torreira (yellow card) 28'; Muriel 70' (pen.); Đuričić (yellow card) 90+4'	Stadium: San Siro; Attendance: 31,938; Referee: Marco Guida

12 February 2017 24	Sampdoria	3–1	Bologna	Genoa
18:00 CET (UTC+01:00)	Schick (yellow card) 63', (goal) 83'; Torreira (yellow card) 72'; Muriel 82' (pen.); Mbaye 88' (o.g.)	Report	Maietta (yellow card) 11'; Džemaili 18', (yellow card) 90+3'; Mbaye (yellow card) 45'; Torosidis (yellow card) 81'	Stadium: Stadio Luigi Ferraris; Attendance: 17,973; Referee: Michael Fabbri

19 February 2017 25	Sampdoria	1–1	Cagliari	Genoa
15:00 CET (UTC+01:00)	Quagliarella 22', (yellow card) 87'; Fernandes (yellow card) 33'; Torreira (yellow card) 59'; Viviano (yellow card) 81'	Report	Isla 6'; Murru (yellow card) 25'; João Pedro (yellow card) 44'; Tachtsidis (yellow card) 62'; Gabriel (yellow card) 78'; Ioniță (yellow card) 85'; Borriello (yellow card) 88'	Stadium: Stadio Luigi Ferraris; Attendance: 18,434; Referee: Davide Massa

26 February 2017 26	Palermo	1–1	Sampdoria	Palermo
12:30 CET (UTC+01:00)	Gazzi (yellow card) 19'; Nestorovski 31' (pen.); Bruno Henrique (yellow card) 53'	Report	Cigarini (yellow card) 18'; Đuričić (yellow card) 46'; Quagliarella 90'	Stadium: Stadio Renzo Barbera; Attendance: 10,139; Referee: Daniele Doveri

4 March 2017 27	Sampdoria	3–1	Pescara	Genoa
18:00 CET (UTC+01:00)	Fernandes 18'; Quagliarella 58'; Schick 68'	Report	Cerri 32'; Coda (yellow card) 48'; Bruno (yellow card) 87'	Stadium: Stadio Luigi Ferraris; Attendance: 17,660; Referee: Fabrizio Pasqua

11 March 2017 28	Genoa	0–1	Sampdoria	Genoa
20:45 CET (UTC+01:00)	Cofie (yellow card) 20'; Pinilla (yellow card) 45'; Ntcham (yellow card) 51'; Burdisso (yellow card) 86'	Report	Sala (yellow card) 41'; Barreto (yellow card) 52'; Muriel 71', (yellow card) 72'; Viviano (yellow card) 90+2'	Stadium: Stadio Luigi Ferraris; Attendance: 31,190; Referee: Daniele Orsato

19 March 2017 29	Sampdoria	0–1	Juventus	Genoa
15:00 CET (UTC+01:00)	Regini (yellow card) 83'	Report	Cuadrado 7'; Dani Alves (yellow card) 83'	Stadium: Stadio Luigi Ferraris; Attendance: 26,127; Referee: Paolo Tagliavento

3 April 2017 30	Internazionale	1–2	Sampdoria	Milan
20:45 CEST (UTC+02:00)	D'Ambrosio 35'; Brozović (yellow card) 85'; Miranda (yellow card) 88'	Report	Schick 50'; Quagliarella 85' (pen.)	Stadium: San Siro; Attendance: 47,043; Referee: Domenico Celi

9 April 2017 31	Sampdoria	2–2	Fiorentina	Genoa
12:30 CEST (UTC+02:00)	Fernandes 5'; Praet (yellow card) 67'; Álvarez 71', (yellow card) 75'	Report	Gonzalo (yellow card) 25', (goal) 60'; Babacar 89'	Stadium: Stadio Luigi Ferraris; Attendance: 19,347; Referee: Carmine Russo

15 April 2017 32	Sassuolo	2–1	Sampdoria	Reggio Emilia
18:00 CEST (UTC+02:00)	Pellegrini (yellow card) 24'; Peluso (yellow card) 45+2'; Ragusa 49'; Acerbi 56'; Politano (yellow card) 58'	Report	Bereszyński (yellow card) 20'; Schick 28'; Linetty (yellow card) 51'	Stadium: Mapei Stadium – Città del Tricolore; Attendance: 11,362; Referee: Luca Pairetto

23 April 2017 33	Sampdoria	1–2	Crotone	Genoa
15:00 CEST (UTC+02:00)	Schick 20'; Praet (yellow card) 61'; Torreira (yellow card) 83'	Report	Ceccherini (yellow card) 62'; Falcinelli 67', (yellow card) 83'; Ferrari (yellow card) 79'; Simy 80'	Stadium: Stadio Luigi Ferraris; Attendance: 18,215; Referee: Nicola Rizzoli

29 April 2017 34	Torino	1–1	Sampdoria	Turin
20:45 CEST (UTC+02:00)	Avelar (yellow card) 36'; Iturbe 78'	Report	Schick 12'; Praet (yellow card) 77'; Regini (yellow card) 80'	Stadium: Stadio Olimpico Grande Torino; Attendance: 17,349; Referee: Davide Massa

7 May 2017 35	Lazio	7–3	Sampdoria	Rome
15:00 CEST (UTC+02:00)	Keita 2'; Immobile 19' (pen.), 70'; Hoedt 36'; Felipe Anderson 38' (pen.); De Vrij 45'; Lulić 65'	Report	Škriniar (red card) 18'; Linetty 32'; Quagliarella 72', 90' (pen.), (yellow card) 78'	Stadium: Stadio Olimpico; Attendance: 40,000; Referee: Paolo Mazzoleni

14 May 2017 36	Sampdoria	1–1	Chievo	Genoa
15:00 CEST (UTC+02:00)	Quagliarella 11'; Regini (yellow card) 23'; Đuričić (yellow card) 85'	Report	Pellissier (yellow card) 25'; Inglese 46'; Radovanović (yellow card) 79'; Depaoli (yellow card) 90'; Castro (yellow card) 90+3'	Stadium: Stadio Luigi Ferraris; Attendance: 18,163; Referee: Fabio Maresca

21 May 2017 37	Udinese	1–1	Sampdoria	Udine
15:00 CEST (UTC+02:00)	Théréau 5'; De Paul (red card) 47'; Danilo (red card) 65'; Jankto (yellow card) 90+3'	Report	Torreira (yellow card) 30'; Sala (yellow card) 56'; Muriel 64' (pen.), (red card) 65'	Stadium: Stadio Friuli; Attendance: 16,119; Referee: Riccardo Pinzani

28 May 2017 38	Sampdoria	2–4	Napoli	Genoa
18:00 CEST (UTC+02:00)	Quagliarella 50'; Škriniar (yellow card) 53'; Álvarez 90'	Report	Mertens 36'; Insigne 42'; Hamšík 49'; Callejón 65'	Stadium: Stadio Luigi Ferraris; Attendance: 19,147; Referee: Luca Banti

=== Coppa Italia ===
14 August 2016 Third round	Sampdoria	3–0	Bassano Virtus	Genoa
20:45 CEST (UTC+02:00)	Torreira (yellow card) 19'; Muriel 22', 63'; Budimir 68'	Report	Maistrello (yellow card) 26'	Stadium: Stadio Luigi Ferraris; Attendance: 8,000; Referee: Michael Fabbri

30 November 2016 Fourth round	Sampdoria	3–0	Cagliari	Genoa
21:00 CET (UTC+01:00)	Álvarez 13'; Regini (yellow card) 27'; Cigarini (yellow card) 56'; Schick 71', 90'	Report	Melchiorri (yellow card) 87'	Stadium: Stadio Luigi Ferraris; Attendance: 4,479; Referee: Michael Fabbri

19 January 2017 Round of 16	Roma	4–0	Sampdoria	Rome
21:00 CET (UTC+01:00)	Nainggolan 39', 90'; Džeko 47'; El Shaarawy 61'	Report		Stadium: Stadio Olimpico; Attendance: 33,507; Referee: Gianpaolo Calvarese

== Statistics ==
=== Appearances and goals ===
No.	Pos	Nat	Player	Total		Serie A		Coppa Italia	
No.	Pos	Nat	Player	Apps	Goals	Apps	Goals	Apps	Goals
Goalkeepers
1	GK	(Italy) ITA	Christian Puggioni	23	0	21	0	2	0
2	GK	(Italy) ITA	Emiliano Viviano	18	0	17	0	1	0
12	GK	(Lithuania) LTU	Titas Krapikas	0	0	0	0	0	0
Defenders
3	DF	(Nigeria) NGA	Stanley Amuzie	0	0	0	0	0	0
4	DF	(Croatia) CRO	Lorenco Šimić	0	0	0	0	0	0
5	DF	(Brazil) BRA	Dodô	9	0	4+3	0	2	0
19	DF	(Italy) ITA	Vasco Regini	37	0	30+4	0	3	0
20	DF	(Switzerland) SUI	Daniel Pavlović	10	0	8+1	0	0+1	0
24	DF	(Poland) POL	Bartosz Bereszyński	14	0	11+2	0	1	0
26	DF	(Argentina) ARG	Matías Silvestre	38	0	36	0	2	0
37	DF	(Slovakia) SVK	Milan Škriniar	35	0	34+1	0	0	0
Midfielders
8	MF	(Paraguay) PAR	Édgar Barreto	33	2	32	2	1	0
10	MF	(Portugal) POR	Bruno Fernandes	35	5	22+11	5	1+1	0
11	MF	(Argentina) ARG	Ricky Álvarez	23	3	11+10	2	2	1
16	MF	(Poland) POL	Karol Linetty	38	1	27+8	1	3	0
17	MF	(Italy) ITA	Angelo Palombo	5	0	2+2	0	1	0
18	MF	(Belgium) BEL	Dennis Praet	34	1	19+13	1	0+2	0
21	MF	(Italy) ITA	Luca Cigarini	7	0	3+1	0	2+1	0
22	MF	(Italy) ITA	Jacopo Sala	21	0	19+1	0	1	0
23	MF	(Serbia) SRB	Filip Đuričić	21	0	3+16	0	2	0
34	MF	(Uruguay) URU	Lucas Torreira	36	0	35	0	1	0
Forwards
9	FW	(Colombia) COL	Luis Muriel	33	13	25+6	11	2	2
14	FW	(Czech Republic) CZE	Patrik Schick	35	13	14+18	11	1+2	2
27	FW	(Italy) ITA	Fabio Quagliarella	38	12	35+2	12	1	0
47	FW	(Croatia) CRO	Ante Budimir	14	1	2+9	0	2+1	1
Players transferred out during the season
6	MF	(Italy) ITA	Mirko Eramo	2	0	0+1	0	1	0
13	DF	(Portugal) POR	Pedro Pereira	12	0	8+4	0	0	0
15	DF	(Slovenia) SVN	Luka Krajnc	1	0	0	0	0+1	0
29	DF	(Italy) ITA	Lorenzo De Silvestri	1	0	0	0	1	0

Last updated: 28 May 2017
Source: Competitions

=== Goalscorers ===
Rank	No.	Pos	Nat	Name	Serie A	Coppa Italia	Total
1	9	FW	(Colombia)	Luis Muriel	11	2	13
1	14	FW	(Czech Republic)	Patrik Schick	11	2	13
3	27	FW	(Italy)	Fabio Quagliarella	12	0	12
4	10	MF	(Portugal)	Bruno Fernandes	5	0	5
5	11	MF	(Argentina)	Ricky Álvarez	2	1	3
6	8	MF	(Paraguay)	Édgar Barreto	2	0	2
7	16	MF	(Poland)	Karol Linetty	1	0	1
7	18	MF	(Belgium)	Dennis Praet	1	0	1
7	47	FW	(Croatia)	Ante Budimir	0	1	1
Own goal					4	0	4
Totals					49	6	55

Last updated: 28 May 2017

=== Clean sheets ===
Rank	No.	Pos	Nat	Name	Serie A	Coppa Italia	Total
1	1	GK	(Italy)	Christian Puggioni	4	1	5
2	2	GK	(Italy)	Emiliano Viviano	3	1	4
Totals					7	2	9

Last updated: 28 May 2017

=== Disciplinary record ===
No.	Pos	Nat	Player	Serie A			Coppa Italia			Total		
No.	Pos	Nat	Player	Booked	(yellow card) (yellow-red card)	Sent off (straight red)	Booked	(yellow card) (yellow-red card)	Sent off (straight red)	Booked	(yellow card) (yellow-red card)	Sent off (straight red)
1	GK	(Italy)	Christian Puggioni	3	0	0	0	0	0	3	0	0
2	GK	(Italy)	Emiliano Viviano	5	0	0	0	0	0	5	0	0
12	GK	(Lithuania)	Titas Krapikas	0	0	0	0	0	0	0	0	0
92	GK	(Italy)	Andrea Tozzo	0	0	0	0	0	0	0	0	0
3	DF	(Nigeria)	Stanley Amuzie	0	0	0	0	0	0	0	0	0
5	DF	(Brazil)	Dodô	0	0	0	0	0	0	0	0	0
13	DF	(Portugal)	Pedro Pereira	5	0	0	0	0	0	5	0	0
15	DF	(Slovenia)	Luka Krajnc	0	0	0	0	0	0	0	0	0
19	DF	(Italy)	Vasco Regini	5	0	0	1	0	0	6	0	0
20	DF	(Switzerland)	Daniel Pavlović	2	0	0	0	0	0	2	0	0
24	DF	(Poland)	Bartosz Bereszyński	1	0	0	0	0	0	1	0	0
26	DF	(Argentina)	Matías Silvestre	2	1	0	0	0	0	2	1	0
37	DF	(Slovakia)	Milan Škriniar	4	0	1	0	0	0	4	0	1
6	MF	(Italy)	Mirko Eramo	0	0	0	0	0	0	0	0	0
7	MF	(Colombia)	Carlos Carbonero	0	0	0	0	0	0	0	0	0
8	MF	(Paraguay)	Édgar Barreto	4	0	1	0	0	0	4	0	1
10	MF	(Portugal)	Bruno Fernandes	2	0	0	0	0	0	2	0	0
11	MF	(Argentina)	Ricky Álvarez	3	0	1	0	0	0	3	0	1
16	MF	(Poland)	Karol Linetty	5	0	0	0	0	0	5	0	0
17	MF	(Italy)	Angelo Palombo	1	0	0	0	0	0	1	0	0
18	MF	(Belgium)	Dennis Praet	4	0	0	0	0	0	4	0	0
21	MF	(Italy)	Luca Cigarini	3	0	0	1	0	0	4	0	0
22	MF	(Italy)	Jacopo Sala	5	0	0	0	0	0	5	0	0
23	MF	(Serbia)	Filip Đuričić	4	0	0	0	0	0	4	0	0
34	MF	(Uruguay)	Lucas Torreira	7	0	0	1	0	0	8	0	0
9	FW	(Colombia)	Luis Muriel	4	0	0	0	0	0	4	0	0
14	FW	(Czech Republic)	Patrik Schick	2	0	0	0	0	0	2	0	0
27	FW	(Italy)	Fabio Quagliarella	2	0	0	0	0	0	2	0	0
47	FW	(Croatia)	Ante Budimir	0	0	0	0	0	0	0	0	0
Totals				73	1	3	3	0	0	76	1	3

Last updated: 28 May 2017
