= 2014–15 UC Sampdoria season =

Sampdoria
2014–15 season
- President: Massimo Ferrero
- Manager: Siniša Mihajlović
- Stadium: Stadio Luigi Ferraris
- Serie A: 7th
- Coppa Italia: Round of 16
- Top goalscorer: League: Éder (9); All: Éder (12)
- Highest home attendance: 30,585 vs Genoa (24 February 2015, Serie A)
- Lowest home attendance: 3,255 vs Brescia (4 December 2014, Coppa Italia)
- Average home league attendance: 21,745
Home colours	Away colours	Third colours

The 2014–15 season was Unione Calcio Sampdoria's third season back in Serie A after having been relegated at the end of the 2011–12 season. The team competed in Serie A, finishing seventh and qualifying for the 2015–16 UEFA Europa League, and the Coppa Italia, finishing in the Round of 16.

== Players ==
=== Squad information ===
As of 30 September 2014.

Note: Flags indicate national team as defined under FIFA eligibility rules; some limited exceptions apply. Players may hold more than one non-FIFA nationality.

No.	Pos.	Nation	Player
1	GK	BRA	Angelo da Costa
2	GK	ITA	Emiliano Viviano
3	DF	ALG	Djamel Mesbah
4	MF	ITA	Alessandro De Vitis
5	DF	ITA	Alessio Romagnoli (on loan from Roma)
6	MF	GHA	Alfred Duncan
7	FW	ITA	Francesco Fedato
9	FW	ITA	Stefano Okaka
10	MF	SRB	Nenad Krstičić
11	FW	ITA	Manolo Gabbiadini
12	FW	ITA	Gianluca Sansone
14	MF	ESP	Pedro Obiang
17	MF	ITA	Angelo Palombo (vice-captain)

No.	Pos.	Nation	Player
18	FW	ARG	Gonzalo Bergessio
19	DF	ITA	Vasco Regini
21	MF	ITA	Roberto Soriano
22	MF	ITA	Luca Rizzo
23	FW	BRA	Éder
27	FW	MNE	Luka Đorđević
28	DF	ITA	Daniele Gastaldello (captain)
29	DF	ITA	Lorenzo De Silvestri
32	MF	ITA	Marco Marchionni
33	GK	ARG	Sergio Romero
44	DF	ITA	Michele Fornasier
77	FW	POL	Paweł Wszołek
86	DF	ITA	Fabrizio Cacciatore

== Competitions ==
=== Serie A ===
==== League table ====
Pos	Team	Pld	W	D	L	GF	GA	GD	Pts	Qualification or relegation
5	Napoli	38	18	9	11	70	54	+16	63	Qualification for the Europa League group stage (Note: Since the winners of the 2014–15 Coppa Italia (Juventus) qualified for European competition based on league position, the spot awarded to the cup winners (Europa League group stage) was passed to the fifth-placed team and the spot originally meant for the fifth-placed team (Europa League third qualifying round) was given to the highest placed team that has obtained an UEFA licence and not already qualified for European competition.)
6	Genoa (Note: Genoa failed to obtain a UEFA licence from Italian Football Federation. Therefore, they were barred to participate in European competitions. Genoa appealed the decision, but the appeal was denied.)	38	16	11	11	62	47	+15	59	
7	Sampdoria	38	13	17	8	48	42	+6	56	Qualification for the Europa League third qualifying round
8	Internazionale	38	14	13	11	59	48	+11	55	
9	Torino	38	14	12	12	48	45	+3	54	

Source: 2014–15 Serie A, 2014-15 Serie A classification.
Rules for classification: 1) points; 2) head-to-head points; 3) head-to-head goal difference; 4) goal difference; 5) number of goals scored; 6) draw. (Head-to-head record is applied for clubs with the same number of points only once all matches between said clubs have been played.).

==== Results summary ====
Overall								Home						Away					
Pld	W	D	L	GF	GA	GD	Pts	W	D	L	GF	GA	GD	W	D	L	GF	GA	GD
38	13	17	8	48	42	+6	56	7	10	2	23	15	+8	6	7	6	25	27	−2

Last updated: 31 May 2015.
Source: Competitive matches

==== Results by round ====
Round	1	2	3	4	5	6	7	8	9	10	11	12	13	14	15	16	17	18	19	20	21	22	23	24	25	26	27	28	29	30	31	32	33	34	35	36	37	38
Ground	A	H	A	H	A	H	A	H	A	H	H	A	H	A	A	H	A	H	A	H	A	H	A	H	A	H	A	H	A	A	H	A	H	H	A	H	A	H
Result	D	W	D	W	W	W	D	D	L	W	D	D	D	W	D	D	L	W	W	D	L	D	L	D	W	W	W	W	L	D	D	L	D	L	W	L	D	D
Position	8	5	7	5	4	3	3	4	5	4	4	4	5	4	4	5	6	5	4	5	5	5	7	6	6	4	6	4	5	6	5	5	5	6	6	7	7	7

Updated to match(es) played on 31 May 2015. Source: Competitive matches
A = Away; H = Home; W = Win; D = Draw; L = Loss

==== Matches ====
31 August 2014 1	Palermo	1–1	Sampdoria	Palermo
20:45 CEST (UTC+02:00)	Dybala 7'; Rigoni (yellow card) 26'	Report	De Silvestri (yellow card) 30'; Regini (yellow card) 33' (yellow-red card) 41'; Okaka (yellow card) 82'; Gastaldello 90+1'	Stadium: Stadio Renzo Barbera; Attendance: 17,064; Referee: Dino Tommasi

14 September 2014 2	Sampdoria	2–0	Torino	Genoa
15:00 CEST (UTC+02:00)	Obiang (yellow card) 24'; Gabbiadini 34'; De Silvestri (yellow card) 53'; Okaka 79'; Soriano (yellow card) 85'	Report	Bovo (yellow card) 13'; Glik (yellow card) 33'; Vives (yellow card) 64'; El Kaddouri (yellow card) 72'	Stadium: Stadio Luigi Ferraris; Attendance: 21,180; Referee: Paolo Mazzoleni

21 September 2014 3	Sassuolo	0–0	Sampdoria	Reggio Emilia
15:00 CEST (UTC+02:00)	Magnanelli (yellow card) 9'; Peluso (yellow card) 59'; Antei (yellow card) 76'	Report	Gastaldello (yellow card) 34'; Gabbiadini (yellow card) 60'	Stadium: Mapei Stadium – Città del Tricolore; Attendance: 12,004; Referee: Marco Di Bello

24 September 2014 4	Sampdoria	2–1	Chievo	Genoa
20:45 CEST (UTC+02:00)	Rizzo (yellow card) 3'; Gastaldello 45'; Romagnoli 80'	Report	Radovanović (yellow card) 38'; Zukanović (yellow card) 69'; Hetemaj (yellow card) 86'; Paloschi 90'	Stadium: Stadio Luigi Ferraris; Attendance: 19,346; Referee: Michael Fabbri

28 September 2014 5	Genoa	0–1	Sampdoria	Genoa
20:45 CEST (UTC+02:00)	Burdisso (yellow card) 49'; Pinilla (yellow card) 53'; Sturaro (yellow card) 78'	Report	Silvestre (yellow card) 38'; Éder (yellow card) 50'; Gabbiadini 75'; Okaka (yellow card) 77'; Obiang (yellow card) 80'	Stadium: Stadio Luigi Ferraris; Attendance: 29,800; Referee: Antonio Damato

5 October 2014 6	Sampdoria	1–0	Atalanta	Genoa
15:00 CEST (UTC+02:00)	Gabbiadini 35'; De Silvestri (yellow card) 57'; Soriano (yellow card) 75'; Romagnoli (yellow card) 88'	Report	Benalouane (yellow card) 55'; Biava (yellow card) 73'; Moralez (yellow card) 75'	Stadium: Stadio Luigi Ferraris; Attendance: 20,050; Referee: Massimiliano Irrati

19 October 2014 7	Cagliari	2–2	Sampdoria	Cagliari
15:00 CEST (UTC+02:00)	Avelar 59' (pen.), (yellow card) 67'; Sau 77'; Benedetti (yellow card) 87'; Cossu (yellow card) 90+3'	Report	Duncan (yellow card) 19'; Gabbiadini 28', (yellow card) 90+3'; Obiang 38'; Cacciatore (yellow card) 48' (yellow-red card) 58'; Palombo (yellow card) 73'; Silvestre (yellow card) 86'; Romagnoli (yellow card) 90'	Stadium: Stadio Sant'Elia; Attendance: 9,426; Referee: Andrea Gervasoni

25 October 2014 8	Sampdoria	0–0	Roma	Genoa
20:45 CEST (UTC+02:00)	Soriano (yellow card) 36'; Palombo (yellow card) 90'	Report	De Rossi (yellow card) 28'; Astori (yellow card) 59'; Holebas (yellow card) 69'	Stadium: Stadio Luigi Ferraris; Attendance: 23,548; Referee: Nicola Rizzoli

29 October 2014 9	Internazionale	1–0	Sampdoria	Milan
20:45 CET (UTC+01:00)	Kovačić (yellow card) 23'; Medel (yellow card) 81'; Icardi 90' (pen.)	Report	Gastaldello (yellow card) 21'; Palombo (yellow card) 48'	Stadium: San Siro; Attendance: 28,057; Referee: Carmine Russo

2 November 2014 10	Sampdoria	3–1	Fiorentina	Genoa
15:00 CET (UTC+01:00)	Palombo 27' (pen.), (yellow card) 32'; Rizzo 43', (yellow card) 57'; Obiang (yellow card) 55'; Éder 77'	Report	Richards (yellow card) 17'; Cuadrado (yellow card) 42'; Savić 45'; Rodríguez (yellow card) 58'; Babacar (yellow card) 59'	Stadium: Stadio Luigi Ferraris; Attendance: 20,822; Referee: Piero Giacomelli

8 November 2014 11	Sampdoria	2–2	Milan	Genoa
20:45 CET (UTC+01:00)	Okaka 45+1'; Éder 51'; Duncan (yellow card) 56'	Report	El Shaarawy 9'; Bonera (yellow card) 27' (yellow-red card) 84'; Mexès (yellow card) 36'; Ménez 65' (pen.); De Sciglio (yellow card) 75'; De Jong (yellow card) 82'	Stadium: Stadio Luigi Ferraris; Attendance: 23,893; Referee: Daniele Orsato

23 November 2014 12	Cesena	1–1	Sampdoria	Cesena
15:00 CET (UTC+01:00)	Brienza (yellow card) 34'; Capelli (yellow card) 43'; Lucchini 60'	Report	Nica 77' (o.g.)	Stadium: Stadio Dino Manuzzi; Attendance: 16,184; Referee: Andrea Gervasoni

1 December 2014 13	Sampdoria	1–1	Napoli	Genoa
21:00 CET (UTC+01:00)	Obiang (yellow card) 19'; Soriano (yellow card) 23'; Romagnoli (yellow card) 53'; Éder 57', (yellow card) 59'	Report	Britos (yellow card) 7'; Koulibaly (yellow card) 35' (yellow-red card) 85'; Inler (yellow card) 56'; Zapata 90+2'	Stadium: Stadio Luigi Ferraris; Attendance: 21,033; Referee: Gianluca Rocchi

8 December 2014 14	Hellas Verona	1–3	Sampdoria	Verona
21:00 CET (UTC+01:00)	Márquez (red card) 26'; Toni 37'; Agostini (yellow card) 46'; Valoti (yellow card) 86'	Report	Éder 28' (pen.); Silvestre (yellow card) 35'; Duncan (yellow card) 43'; Okaka 57'; Gabbiadini 62'; De Silvestri (yellow card) 64'	Stadium: Stadio Marc'Antonio Bentegodi; Attendance: 18,390; Referee: Dino Tommasi

14 December 2014 15	Juventus	1–1	Sampdoria	Turin
12:30 CET (UTC+01:00)	Evra 12'; Vidal (yellow card) 49'; Bonucci (yellow card) 66'	Report	Regini (yellow card) 10'; Gabbiadini 51', (yellow card) 59'; Romagnoli (yellow card) 54'; Okaka (yellow card) 71'; Romero (yellow card) 90+2'	Stadium: Juventus Stadium; Attendance: 39,089; Referee: Daniele Doveri

21 December 2014 16	Sampdoria	2–2	Udinese	Genoa
15:00 CET (UTC+01:00)	Obiang 15'; Soriano (yellow card) 18'; Gabbiadini (yellow card) 37', (goal) 60'; Éder (yellow card) 86'	Report	Widmer (yellow card) 22'; Geijo 31'; Danilo 34'; Heurtaux (yellow card) 43' (yellow-red card) 88'; Pasquale (yellow card) 65'; Pinzi (yellow card) 90+4'; Kone (yellow card) 90+5'	Stadium: Stadio Luigi Ferraris; Attendance: 21,413; Referee: Massimiliano Irrati

5 January 2015 17	Lazio	3–0	Sampdoria	Rome
20:45 CET (UTC+01:00)	Parolo 38'; Anderson 41'; Cana (yellow card) 45+1'; Basta (yellow card) 56'; Đorđević 66'	Report	Gastaldello (yellow card) 19'; Soriano (yellow card) 64'	Stadium: Stadio Olimpico; Attendance: 31,322; Referee: Gianpaolo Calvarese

11 January 2015 18	Sampdoria	1–0	Empoli	Genoa
15:00 CET (UTC+01:00)	Éder 49'; Palombo (yellow card) 59'	Report	Mário Rui (yellow card) 24'; Hysaj (yellow card) 36'	Stadium: Stadio Luigi Ferraris; Attendance: 19,931; Referee: Dino Tommasi

18 January 2015 19	Parma	0–2	Sampdoria	Parma
15:00 CET (UTC+01:00)	Lucarelli (yellow card) 43'; Paletta (yellow card) 60'	Report	Obiang (yellow card) 38'; Bergessio 54'; Soriano 70'	Stadium: Stadio Ennio Tardini; Attendance: 14,130; Referee: Andrea Gervasoni

25 January 2015 20	Sampdoria	1–1	Palermo	Genoa
15:00 CET (UTC+01:00)	Éder 6'; Obiang (yellow card) 60'; Soriano (yellow card) 73'; De Silvestri (yellow card) 76'	Report	González (yellow card) 21'; Vázquez 49'; Bolzoni (yellow card) 61'; Anđelković (yellow card) 67'	Stadium: Stadio Luigi Ferraris; Attendance: 22,023; Referee: Angelo Cervellera

1 February 2015 21	Torino	5–1	Sampdoria	Turin
15:00 CET (UTC+01:00)	Quagliarella 16', 29' (pen.), 65'; Gazzi (yellow card) 17'; Amauri 75'; Peres 90+3'	Report	Silvestre (yellow card) 29'; De Silvestri (yellow card) 41'; Obiang 77'	Stadium: Stadio Olimpico di Torino; Attendance: 14,401; Referee: Piero Giacomelli

8 February 2015 22	Sampdoria	1–1	Sassuolo	Genoa
15:00 CET (UTC+01:00)	Éder 9'; Obiang (yellow card) 12'; Okaka (yellow card) 71'; De Silvestri (yellow card) 84'; Regini (yellow card) 85'	Report	Acerbi 2'; Biondini (yellow card) 13'; Brighi (yellow card) 16'; Lazarević (yellow card) 23'; Cannavaro (yellow card) 58'; Taïder (yellow card) 83'	Stadium: Stadio Luigi Ferraris; Attendance: 19,710; Referee: Massimiliano Irrati

15 February 2015 23	Chievo	2–1	Sampdoria	Verona
18:00 CET (UTC+01:00)	Izco 2'; Meggiorini 39'; Hetemaj (yellow card) 82'; Bizzarri (yellow card) 90+3'; Botta (yellow card) 90+4'	Report	Mesbah (yellow card) 55'; Acquah (yellow card) 65'; Muriel 90+1'; Romagnoli (yellow card) 90+4'	Stadium: Stadio Marc'Antonio Bentegodi; Attendance: 12,000; Referee: Sebastiano Peruzzo

24 February 2015 24	Sampdoria	1–1	Genoa	Genoa
20:45 CET (UTC+01:00)	Viviano (yellow card) 17'; Éder 19', (yellow card) 73'; Soriano (yellow card) 40'; Obiang (yellow card) 76'	Report	Falque 17'; Roncaglia (yellow card) 26'	Stadium: Stadio Luigi Ferraris; Attendance: 30,585; Referee: Gianluca Rocchi

1 March 2015 25	Atalanta	1–2	Sampdoria	Bergamo
15:00 CET (UTC+01:00)	Stendardo 16', (yellow card) 50'; D'Alessandro (yellow card) 87'	Report	Regini (yellow card) 24'; Muriel 68'; Viviano (yellow card) 77'; Okaka 81', (yellow card) 82'; Eto'o (yellow card) 90+3'	Stadium: Stadio Atleti Azzurri d'Italia; Attendance: 16,180; Referee: Antonio Damato

7 March 2015 26	Sampdoria	2–0	Cagliari	Genoa
18:00 CET (UTC+01:00)	De Silvestri 33'; Acquah (yellow card) 41'; Romagnoli (yellow card) 49'; Eto'o 72'	Report	Avelar (yellow card) 35' (yellow-red card) 82'; Cossu (yellow card) 39'	Stadium: Stadio Luigi Ferraris; Attendance: 21,127; Referee: Dino Tommasi

16 March 2015 27	Roma	0–2	Sampdoria	Rome
21:00 CET (UTC+01:00)	Astori (yellow card) 56'; Keita (yellow card) 81' (red card) 81'; Pjanić (yellow card) 86'	Report	Obiang (yellow card) 24'; Silvestre (yellow card) 39'; Palombo (yellow card) 51'; De Silvestri 60'; Muriel 78'	Stadium: Stadio Olimpico; Attendance: 33,250; Referee: Gianpaolo Calvarese

22 March 2015 28	Sampdoria	1–0	Internazionale	Genoa
20:45 CET (UTC+01:00)	Soriano (yellow card) 17'; Romagnoli (yellow card) 20'; Éder 65', (yellow card) 86'	Report	Shaqiri (yellow card) 22'; Vidić (yellow card) 31'; Juan Jesus (yellow card) 44'; D'Ambrosio (yellow card) 64'; Icardi (yellow card) 68'; Medel (yellow card) 69'	Stadium: Stadio Luigi Ferraris; Attendance: 22,865; Referee: Paolo Valeri

4 April 2015 29	Fiorentina	2–0	Sampdoria	Florence
18:30 CEST (UTC+02:00)	Gonzalo (yellow card) 11'; Diamanti (yellow card) 44', (goal) 61'; Salah 64'	Report	Regini (yellow card) 69'	Stadium: Stadio Artemio Franchi; Attendance: 33,777; Referee: Luca Banti

12 April 2015 30	Milan	1–1	Sampdoria	Milan
20:45 CEST (UTC+02:00)	Paletta (yellow card) 52'; De Jong 74', (yellow card) 83'; Mexès (yellow card) 90+5'	Report	Obiang (yellow card) 43'; Soriano 58'; Wszołek (yellow card) 90+5'	Stadium: San Siro; Attendance: 30,735; Referee: Gianluca Rocchi

18 April 2015 31	Sampdoria	0–0	Cesena	Genoa
18:00 CEST (UTC+02:00)	Silvestre (yellow card) 59'; Okaka (yellow card) 71'	Report	Perico (yellow card) 30'; Mudingayi (yellow card) 74'; Krajnc (yellow card) 77'	Stadium: Stadio Luigi Ferraris; Attendance: 21,182; Referee: Piero Giacomelli

26 April 2015 32	Napoli	4–2	Sampdoria	Naples
20:45 CEST (UTC+02:00)	Britos (yellow card) 3'; Gabbiadini 31'; Higuaín 34', 81' (pen.); Insigne 47'	Report	Albiol 12' (o.g.); Mesbah (yellow card) 24'; Muriel 89', (yellow card) 90'	Stadium: Stadio San Paolo; Attendance: 22,299; Referee: Daniele Doveri

29 April 2015 33	Sampdoria	1–1	Hellas Verona	Genoa
20:45 CEST (UTC+02:00)	Acquah (yellow card) 36' (yellow-red card) 57'; De Silvestri 65'; Muñoz (yellow card) 80'; Obiang (yellow card) 80'	Report	Valoti (yellow card) 16'; Sørensen (yellow card) 24'; Toni 68'; Brivio (yellow card) 82'; Rodríguez (yellow card) 89'	Stadium: Stadio Luigi Ferraris; Attendance: 19,609; Referee: Massimiliano Irrati

2 May 2015 34	Sampdoria	0–1	Juventus	Genoa
18:00 CEST (UTC+02:00)	Obiang (yellow card) 44'; De Silvestri (yellow card) 83'; Soriano (yellow card) 87'; Romagnoli (yellow card) 89'	Report	Vidal 32'; Sturaro (yellow card) 61'	Stadium: Stadio Luigi Ferraris; Attendance: 22,083; Referee: Paolo Valeri

10 May 2015 35	Udinese	1–4	Sampdoria	Udine
15:00 CEST (UTC+02:00)	Piris (yellow card) 82'; Di Natale 87' (pen.)	Report	Soriano 25', 62', (yellow card) 39'; Regini (yellow card) 56'; Acquah 80'; Viviano (yellow card) 86'; Duncan 89'; Coda (yellow card) 90+4'	Stadium: Stadio Friuli; Attendance: 8,492; Referee: Marco Di Bello

16 May 2015 36	Sampdoria	0–1	Lazio	Genoa
20:45 CEST (UTC+02:00)	Palombo (yellow card) 16'; Silvestre (yellow card) 40'	Report	Gentiletti 54'	Stadium: Stadio Luigi Ferraris; Attendance: 21,843; Referee: Paolo Mazzoleni

24 May 2015 37	Empoli	1–1	Sampdoria	Empoli
12:30 CEST (UTC+02:00)	Valdifiori (yellow card) 41'; Pucciarelli 57'; Maccarone (yellow card) 90+5'; Vecino (yellow card) 90+6'	Report	Acquah (yellow card) 45+3'; Muriel (yellow card) 47'; Eto'o 90+1'; Romagnoli (yellow card) 90+5'	Stadium: Stadio Carlo Castellani; Attendance: 9,084; Referee: Gianpaolo Calvarese

31 May 2015 38	Sampdoria	2–2	Parma	Genoa
20:45 CEST (UTC+02:00)	Romagnoli 53'; De Silvestri 79'	Report	Palladino 75'; Jorquera (yellow card) 78'; Varela 88'	Stadium: Stadio Luigi Ferraris; Attendance: 20,913; Referee: Davide Massa

=== Coppa Italia ===
24 August 2014 Third round	Sampdoria	4–1	Como	Genoa
20:45 CEST (UTC+02:00)	Éder 6', 57', 74'; Gabbiadini 13'; Regini (yellow card) 54'		Le Noci 32' (pen.); Fietta (yellow card) 45'	Stadium: Stadio Luigi Ferraris; Attendance: 8,089; Referee: Luca Pairetto

4 December 2014 Fourth round	Sampdoria	2–0	Brescia	Genoa
21:00 CET (UTC+01:00)	Gabbiadini 33' (pen.); Regini (yellow card) 44'; Obiang (yellow card) 53'; Bergessio 58', (yellow card) 82'	Report	Arcari (yellow card) 32'; Olivera (yellow card) 50'	Stadium: Stadio Luigi Ferraris; Attendance: 3,255; Referee: Leonardo Baracani

21 January 2015 Round of 16	Internazionale	2–0	Sampdoria	Milan
21:00 CET (UTC+01:00)	Andreolli (yellow card) 23'; Podolski (yellow card) 42'; Shaqiri (yellow card) 63', (goal) 71'; Icardi 88'	Report	Krstičić (red card) 11'; Wszołek (yellow card) 36' (yellow-red card) 77'; Romagnoli (yellow card) 60'; Gastaldello (yellow card) 78'	Stadium: San Siro; Attendance: 38,497; Referee: Paolo Tagliavento

== Statistics ==
	Total	Home	Away	Neutral
Games played	1	1		
Games won	1	1		
Games drawn				
Games lost				
Biggest win	4–1	4–1		
Biggest loss				
Biggest win (League)				
Biggest win (Cup)	4–1	4–1		
Biggest loss (League)				
Biggest loss (Cup)				
Clean sheets				
Goals scored	4	4		
Goals conceded	1	1		
Goal difference	+3	+3		
Average GF per game	4	4		
Average GA per game	1	1		
Yellow cards				
Red cards				
Most appearances				
Top scorer	Éder (3)			
Worst discipline				
Penalties for				
Penalties against				
League points				
Winning rate	100%	100%		

=== Appearances and goals ===
No.	Pos	Nat	Player	Total		Serie A		Coppa Italia	
No.	Pos	Nat	Player	Apps	Goals	Apps	Goals	Apps	Goals
Goalkeepers
2	GK	(Italy) ITA	Emiliano Viviano	29	0	29	0	0	0
33	GK	(Argentina) ARG	Sergio Romero	10	0	9+1	0	0	0
88	GK	(Italy) ITA	Alberto Frison	0	0	0	0	0	0
96	GK	(Italy) ITA	Samuele Massolo	0	0	0	0	0	0
Defenders
3	DF	(Algeria) ALG	Djamel Mesbah	16	0	12+4	0	0	0
5	DF	(Italy) ITA	Alessio Romagnoli	30	2	28+2	2	0	0
19	DF	(Italy) ITA	Vasco Regini	28	0	25+3	0	0	0
20	DF	(Argentina) ARG	Ezequiel Muñoz	17	1	16+1	1	0	0
25	DF	(Italy) ITA	Andrea Coda	2	0	0+2	0	0	0
26	DF	(Argentina) ARG	Matías Silvestre	29	0	28+1	0	0	0
28	DF	(Italy) ITA	Daniele Gastaldello	14	2	13+1	2	0	0
29	DF	(Italy) ITA	Lorenzo De Silvestri	33	4	33	4	0	0
86	DF	(Italy) ITA	Fabrizio Cacciatore	11	0	8+3	0	0	0
Midfielders
4	MF	(Italy) ITA	Alessandro De Vitis	0	0	0	0	0	0
6	MF	(Ghana) GHA	Alfred Duncan	26	1	13+13	1	0	0
14	MF	(Spain) ESP	Pedro Obiang	34	3	32+2	3	0	0
17	MF	(Italy) ITA	Angelo Palombo	36	1	34+2	1	0	0
21	MF	(Italy) ITA	Roberto Soriano	33	4	29+4	4	0	0
22	MF	(Italy) ITA	Luca Rizzo	15	1	7+8	1	0	0
30	MF	(Ghana) GHA	Afriyie Acquah	10	1	10	1	0	0
32	MF	(Italy) ITA	Marco Marchionni	1	0	1	0	0	0
Forwards
8	FW	(Argentina) ARG	Joaquín Correa	6	0	2+4	0	0	0
9	FW	(Italy) ITA	Stefano Okaka	32	4	26+6	4	0	0
18	FW	(Argentina) ARG	Gonzalo Bergessio	23	1	7+16	1	0	0
23	FW	(Brazil) BRA	Éder	30	9	28+2	9	0	0
24	FW	(Colombia) COL	Luis Muriel	16	4	11+5	4	0	0
77	FW	(Poland) POL	Paweł Wszołek	6	0	2+4	0	0	0
99	FW	(Cameroon) CMR	Samuel Eto'o	18	2	13+5	2	0	0
Players transferred out during the season
1	GK	(Brazil) BRA	Angelo da Costa	0	0	0	0	0	0
7	FW	(Italy) ITA	Francesco Fedato	1	0	0+1	0	0	0
10	MF	(Serbia) SRB	Nenad Krstičić	12	0	2+10	0	0	0
11	FW	(Italy) ITA	Manolo Gabbiadini	13	7	11+2	7	0	0
12	FW	(Italy) ITA	Gianluca Sansone	4	0	1+3	0	0	0
27	FW	(Montenegro) MNE	Luka Đorđević	3	0	1+2	0	0	0
44	DF	(Italy) ITA	Michele Fornasier	0	0	0	0	0	0

Last updated: 31 May 2015
Source: Competitions
