= Pedro Obiang =

Equatoguinean footballer (born 1992)

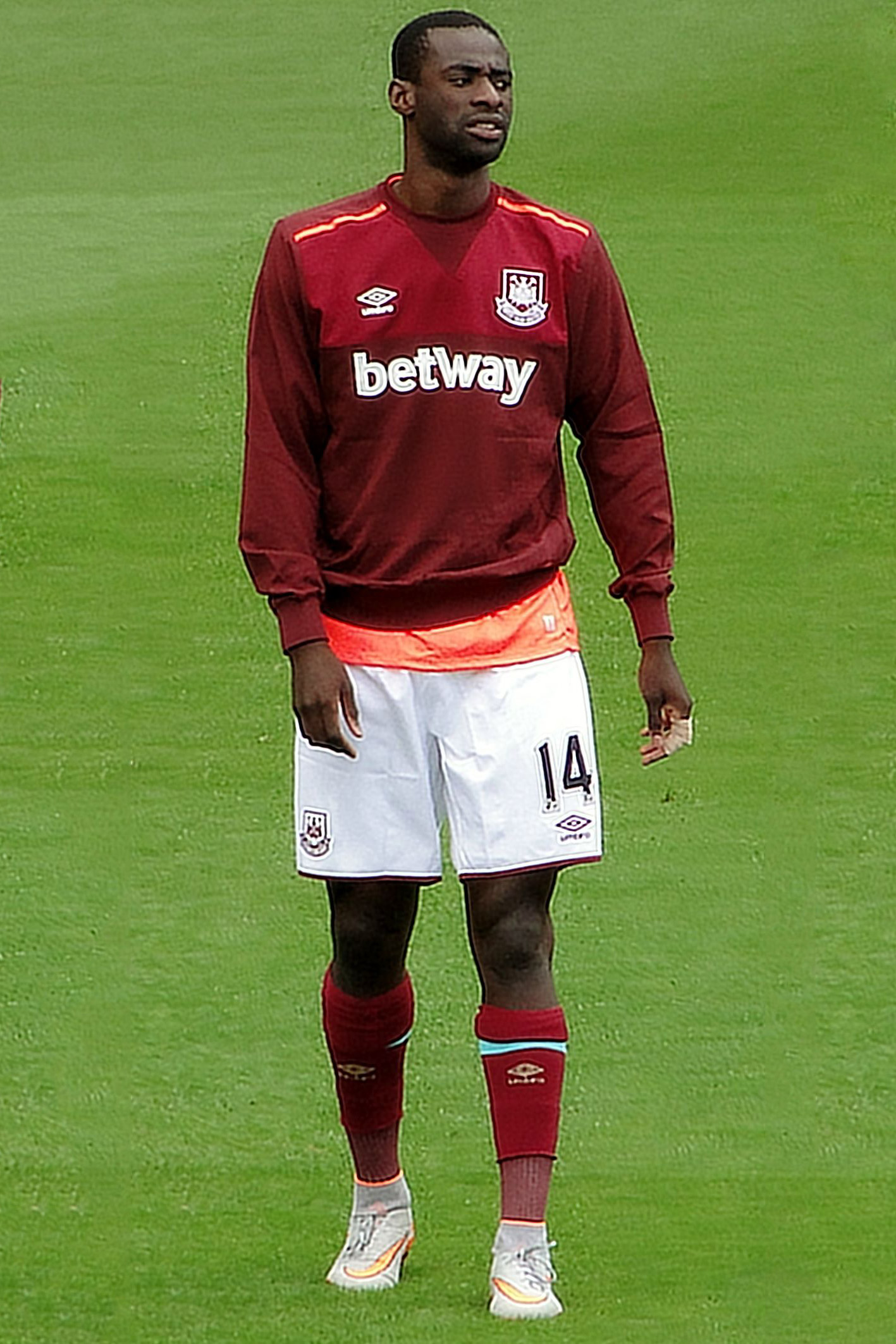
- Obiang with West Ham United in 2015

Personal information
- Full name: Pedro Mba Obiang Avomo
- Date of birth: 27 March 1992 (age 34)
- Place of birth: Alcalá de Henares, Spain
- Height: 1.85 m (6 ft 1 in)
- Position: Midfielder

Team information
- Current team: Monza (sporting director)

Youth career
- –2008: Atlético Madrid
- 2008–2010: Sampdoria

Senior career*
Years	Team	Apps	(Gls)
2010–2015	Sampdoria	128	(4)
2015–2019	West Ham United	91	(3)
2019–2025	Sassuolo	118	(2)
2025–2026	Monza	32	(2)
Total		369	(11)

International career
2009	Spain U17	2	(0)
2011	Spain U19	3	(0)
2013–2014	Spain U21	2	(0)
2018–2025	Equatorial Guinea	29	(3)
- * Club domestic league appearances and goals

Pedro Mba Obiang Avomo (born 27 March 1992) is a football executive and former player who is the sporting director of Serie A club Monza. Born in Spain, he played for the Equatorial Guinea national team.

A midfielder, Obiang started his career in 2010 with Sampdoria and transferred to English club West Ham United in 2015. He returned to Italy in 2019, joining Sassuolo, before moving to Monza in 2025.

Obiang played for Spain at under-17, under-19 and under-21 levels, before switching to represent Equatorial Guinea at senior level.

== Club career ==
=== Sampdoria ===
Born in Alcalá de Henares, in the Community of Madrid, Obiang began his football career playing for various teams from his home city, such as CD Avance, RSD Alcalá and AD Naya, where he excelled. Due to these participations, he was transferred to the Cadete team of Atlético Madrid. He left Atlético for Sampdoria in 2008 at age 16, the minimum age at which international transfer within the European Union is allowed. He was the member of Allievi Nazionali youth team in 2008–09 season, but also call-up to the first team in pre-season. He was also an unused substitute against Lazio and against Chievo, by the decision of head coach Walter Mazzarri. In 2009–10, he was promoted to the Under-19 Primavera squad.

Primarily a youth team player, Obiang also played seven times in pre-season friendlies in the summer of 2010, scoring two goals. After the injury crisis of the Genoese team in which the team lost midfielders Stefano Guberti, Fernando Tissone, Andrea Poli and Paolo Sammarco, he received a call-up again from new head coach Domenico Di Carlo, and made his competitive debut on 12 September 2010. He substituted Vladimir Koman in the 58th minute, at that time Sampdoria losing 2–1 to Juventus; eventually, Sampdoria 3–3 draw at Stadio Olimpico di Torino. Obiang signed a new, five-year contract extension with Doria on the morning before the start of the match.

Obiang also named in 2010–11 UEFA Champions League 25-men senior squad (list A) for play-off round and received the call-up against Werder Bremen, however Obiang was not named as one of players on the substitutes' bench. He also received his first call-up for 2010–11 UEFA Europa League on 28 September 2010 as a list B player (Under-21 youth product). He made his European debut on 16 December 2010 (matchday 6), with the club already eliminated before the match, a 0–2 defeat to Debreceni.

=== West Ham United ===
On 10 June 2015, West Ham United announced the signing of Obiang for an undisclosed fee on a four-year contract. He made his Premier League debut on 15 August as a half-time substitute for Reece Oxford in a 1–2 home defeat to Leicester City. In November 2016, Obiang was announced as West Ham's Player of the Month for October.

On 4 February 2017, Obiang scored his first Premier League goal for West Ham on his 55th appearance for the club, against Southampton. The ball fell to Obiang from a corner, where he controlled and then shot, finding the bottom corner from 25 yards out. On 20 March 2017, he was ruled out for the remainder of the 2016–17 season, having rolled his ankle during a home defeat by Leicester on 18 March 2017. In January 2018, Obiang was injured during an FA Cup game against Wigan Athletic. In February, he underwent knee surgery and was ruled out for the remainder of the 2017–18 season.

Obiang won the 2017–18 West Ham goal of the season award for his thunderbolt strike against Tottenham.

=== Sassuolo ===
On 24 July 2019, Obiang signed for Sassuolo. He was diagnosed with bronchopulmonary disease in August 2021 and was omitted from all sporting activity as a precaution.

=== Monza ===
On 5 June 2025, Obiang signed a one-year contract with an option to extend with Monza, who had just been relegated to Serie B.

== International career ==
Obiang has been capped for Spain at youth levels. Obiang received a call-up for the Porto International Tournament in April 2011.

Due to his Fang background, the Gabonese Football Federation tried, unsuccessfully, to persuade Obiang to play for Gabon, although both his parents and his grandparents are from Equatorial Guinea. In November 2011, they included him in a squad list for a match between the country's under-20 and China; however, he ignored the call.

Being eligible to represent Equatorial Guinea, in 2011, the country's federation approached Obiang to enquire if he would be willing to represent the country at the 2012 Africa Cup of Nations; however, Obiang declined. In April 2015, after a meeting with the Equatoguinean Football Federation people, Obiang's stance on representing Equatorial Guinea appeared to have changed after showing a desire to play for the country. On 5 October 2016, Obiang reunited in London with Equatoguinean Football Federation president Andrés Mbomio, and Equatoguinean national team head coach and coordinator Esteban Becker and Juvenal Edjogo Owono respectively to reach an agreement.

On 7 November 2018, Obiang was officially called up for the Equatorial Guinea national team. Obiang made his debut for Equatorial Guinea in a 1–0 loss to Senegal on 18 November 2018. In December 2018 he said he was "proud" to play for the nation. He scored his first international goal on 22 March 2019 in a 4–1 African Cup of Nations qualifying win against Sudan.

== Executive career ==
In August 2026, Obiang was appointed sporting director of newly Serie A promoted club Monza, with whom he retired as a professional footballer.

== Personal life ==
Obiang is the nephew of Teodoro Obiang Nguema Mbasogo, the second president of Equatorial Guinea.

== Career statistics ==
=== Club ===
Appearances and goals by club, season and competition
Club	Season	League			National cup (Note: Includes Coppa Italia, FA Cup)		League cup (Note: Includes EFL Cup)		Europe		Other		Total	
Club	Season	Division	Apps	Goals	Apps	Goals	Apps	Goals	Apps	Goals	Apps	Goals	Apps	Goals
Sampdoria	2010–11	Serie A	4	0	0	0	—		1 (Note: Appearance(s) in UEFA Europa League)	0	—		5	0
Sampdoria	2011–12	Serie B	29	0	1	0	—		—		4 (Note: Appearances in Serie B promotion play-offs)	0	34	0
Sampdoria	2012–13	Serie A	34	1	1	0	—		—		—		35	1
Sampdoria	2013–14	Serie A	27	0	2	0	—		—		—		29	0
Sampdoria	2014–15	Serie A	34	3	2	0	—		—		—		36	3
Sampdoria	Total		128	4	6	0	0	0	1	0	5	0	139	4
West Ham United	2015–16	Premier League	24	0	5	0	1	0	0	0	—		30	0
West Ham United	2016–17	Premier League	22	1	1	0	3	0	4	0	—		30	1
West Ham United	2017–18	Premier League	21	2	3	0	3	0	—		—		27	2
West Ham United	2018–19	Premier League	24	0	2	0	3	0	—		—		29	0
West Ham United	Total		91	3	11	0	10	0	4	0	0	0	116	3
Sassuolo	2019–20	Serie A	25	1	2	0	—		—		—		27	1
Sassuolo	2020–21	Serie A	33	0	1	0	—		—		—		34	0
Sassuolo	2021–22	Serie A	0	0	0	0	—		—		—		0	0
Sassuolo	2022–23	Serie A	17	0	0	0	—		—		—		17	0
Sassuolo	2023–24	Serie A	8	0	0	0	—		—		—		8	0
Sassuolo	2024–25	Serie B	35	1	3	0	—		—		—		38	1
Sassuolo	Total		118	2	6	0	0	0	0	0	0	0	124	2
Monza	2025–26	Serie A	32	2	1	0	—		—		3	0	36	2
Career total			369	11	24	0	10	0	5	0	7	0	415	11

=== International ===
Appearances and goals by national team and year
National team	Year	Apps	Goals
Equatorial Guinea	2018	1	0
Equatorial Guinea	2019	6	2
Equatorial Guinea	2020	2	1
Equatorial Guinea	2021	2	0
Equatorial Guinea	2022	2	0
Equatorial Guinea	2023	2	0
Equatorial Guinea	2024	8	0
Equatorial Guinea	2025	6	0
Total		29	3

Scores and results list Equatorial Guinea's goal tally first, score column indicates score after each Obiang goal.

List of international goals scored by Pedro Obiang
No.	Date	Venue	Opponent	Score	Result	Competition
1	22 March 2019	Al-Hilal Stadium, Omdurman, Sudan	Sudan	4–1	4–1	2019 Africa Cup of Nations qualification
2	15 November 2019	National Stadium, Dar es Salaam, Tanzania	Tanzania	1–0	1–2	2021 Africa Cup of Nations qualification
3	11 November 2020	Al Salam Stadium, Cairo, Egypt	Libya	2–2	3–2	2021 Africa Cup of Nations qualification

== Honours ==
Sassuolo

- Serie B: 2024–25
