= Emiliano Viviano =

Italian footballer (born 1985)

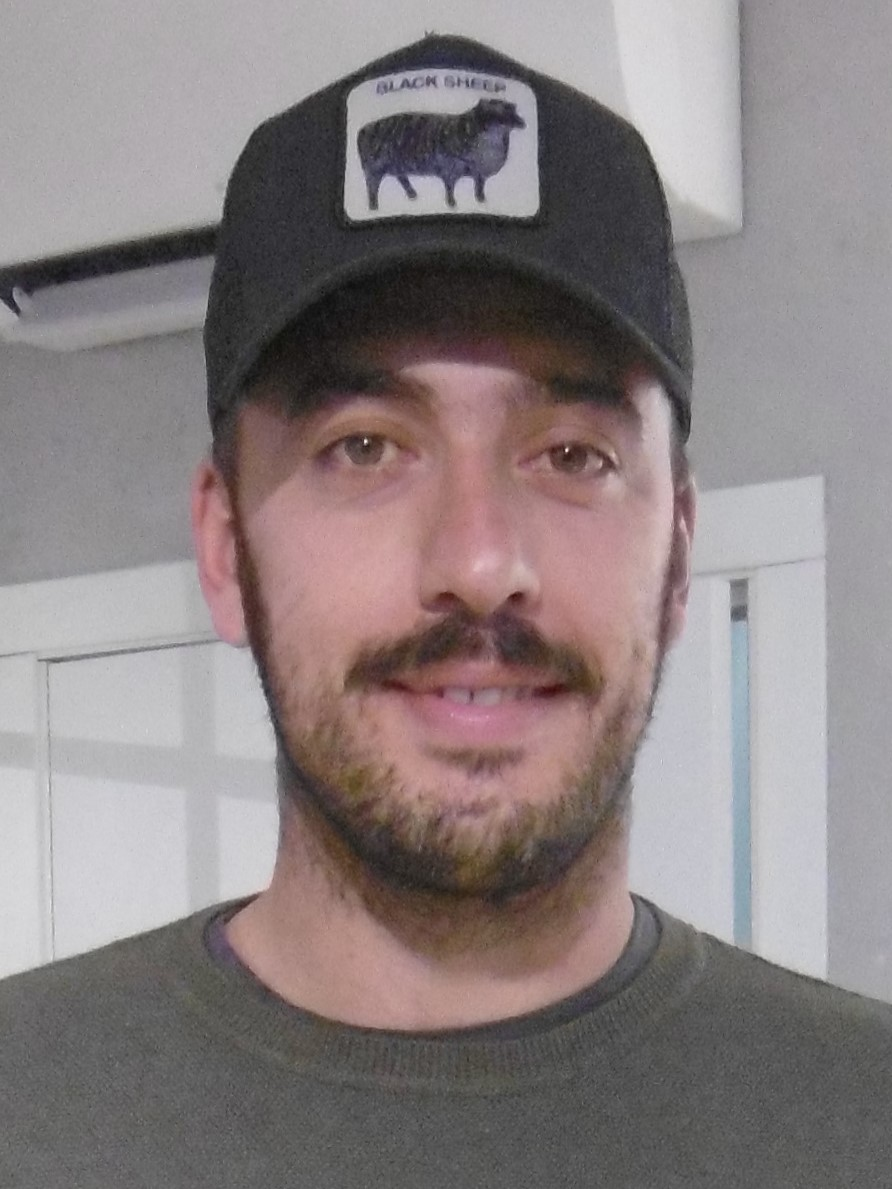
- Viviano in 2019

Personal information
- Full name: Emiliano Viviano
- Date of birth: 1 December 1985 (age 40)
- Place of birth: Florence, Italy
- Height: 1.95 m (6 ft 5 in)
- Position: Goalkeeper

Youth career
- 1999–2002: Fiorentina
- 2002–2004: Brescia

Senior career*
Years	Team	Apps	(Gls)
2004–2009	Brescia	126	(0)
2004–2005	→ Cesena (loan)	13	(0)
2009–2011	Bologna	72	(0)
2011–2012	Inter Milan	0	(0)
2012–2014	Palermo	20	(0)
2012–2013	→ Fiorentina (loan)	32	(0)
2013–2014	→ Arsenal (loan)	0	(0)
2014–2018	Sampdoria	110	(0)
2018–2019	Sporting CP	0	(0)
2019	→ SPAL (loan)	17	(0)
2020–2023	Fatih Karagümrük	87	(0)
2023–2024	Ascoli	27	(0)
Total		504	(0)

International career
2001	Italy U16	1	(0)
2003	Italy U18	2	(0)
2003–2004	Italy U19	11	(0)
2004–2005	Italy U20	10	(0)
2006–2007	Italy U21	5	(0)
2008	Italy U23	1	(0)
2008	Italy Olympic	4	(0)
2010–2011	Italy	6	(0)
- * Club domestic league appearances and goals

Emiliano Viviano (Italian pronunciation: [emiˈljaːno viˈvjaːno]; born 1 December 1985) is an Italian former professional footballer who played as a goalkeeper.

== Club career ==
=== Brescia ===
Born in Florence, Viviano is a product of Fiorentina and Brescia youth teams. He started his career with a loan in Serie B at Cesena in the 2004–05 season. Then he spent four years as first-choice goalkeeper in Serie B with Brescia.

=== Inter, Brescia loan & Bologna ===
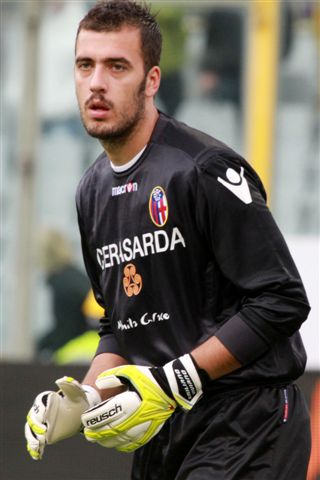
Viviano playing for Bologna in 2011

In January 2009, Viviano was signed by Inter Milan in a co-ownership deal for €3.5 million. He was immediately loaned back to Brescia. In the 2009–10 season he made his debut in Serie A with Bologna where he became the first-choice goalkeeper. Bologna signed him in by purchasing Viviano's 50% registration rights from Brescia also for €3.5 million.

=== Inter return, Genoa and Palermo ===
On 25 June 2011, Viviano rejoined Inter Milan from Bologna after the Lega Serie A had announced the results of the co-ownership deals. Due to an administrative error he once again linked up with Inter, on this occasion for a fee of €4.1 million. The error came about as the Bologna club director, Stefano Pedrelli, had accidentally halved the initial €4.71 million valuation of the remaining 50% of Viviano's contract again, leading the club to bid only €2.33 million in response to Inter's €4.1 million valuation of the player on the bid submitted to the league office on 24 June. On 23 July 2011, Viviano was diagnosed with a complete tear of the anterior cruciate ligament in the left knee. The injury ruled him out for almost half of the 2011–12 season. In August 2011, Inter swapped Viviano with Juraj Kucka in a co-ownership deal, which entailed half of Kucka's registration rights for €8 million and half of Viviano's registration rights for €5 million. However both players remained with their original clubs until Viviano had recovered from his injury. In January 2012, Palermo bought Genoa's half to end their search for a goalkeeper since the summer of 2011. He signed a contract which lasted until 30 June 2016. Viviano would compete with Greek international Alexandros Tzorvas for a starting spot and squeezed Francesco Benussi out. In a separate deal, the transfer fee would partially compensate for the signing of Cesare Bovo from Palermo to Genoa outright.

In June 2012, the co-ownership deal of Viviano was renewed between Inter and Palermo; Kucka, however, returned to Genoa from Inter for €6.5 million with youngster Samuele Longo returned to Inter for €7 million; less than a month later, Inter sold Viviano to Palermo outright in another player swap (for Silvestre), making the club eventually received no cash for their €7.6 million investment on Viviano.

=== Fiorentina ===
In July 2012, Palermo also bought Inter's 50% of the player for €3 million (with Matías Silvestre to Inter on loan also for €3 million), and instantly loaned him to his hometown club Fiorentina for €500,000 with option to buy outright for €7.5 million.

=== Arsenal ===
On 2 September 2013, Viviano moved to Premier League team Arsenal on a one-year loan deal with an option to make the move permanent at the end of the season. However, Viviano returned to Palermo at the end of the season without having played a competitive game for Arsenal.

=== Sampdoria ===
On 12 August 2014, Viviano was signed by Sampdoria in a temporary deal, with an option to sign him outright. On 26 June 2015, the loan was extended with an obligation to purchase. He signed a 1+4 year contract with a transfer fee of €2.3 million (€24,000 loan fee + €2.276 million outright).

=== Sporting CP ===
After the departure of Rui Patrício, on 22 June 2018, Viviano was signed by Sporting CP from Italian side Sampdoria for a reported fee of €2 million.

=== S.P.A.L ===
On 7 January 2019, Viviano was loaned to Spal until the end of the season.

=== Fatih Karagümrük ===
On 26 August 2020, Viviano joined Fatih Karagümrük on a free transfer.

=== Ascoli ===
On 8 August 2023, Viviano signed a one-season contract with Ascoli.

== International career ==
Viviano was the first-choice goalkeeper for Italy at the 2005 FIFA World Youth Championship. He was a part of the Italian squad that took part at the 2007 UEFA European Under-21 Championship. He made another appearance for the national U-21 side in a friendly against the Dutch U21 side on 5 February 2008 in preparation for the upcoming Olympics. Viviano went on to play at the 2008 Summer Olympics with Italy. The Olympic team was primarily composed of players from the Italy U21 side that took part at the 2007 European Under-21 Championship side, but who would no longer be eligible to play in the 2009 edition of the tournament. Viviano did not take part in the 2008 Toulon Tournament, however, a warm-up tournament before the Olympics. At the 2008 Olympics in Beijing, Italy reached the quarter-finals, where they suffered a 3–2 defeat to Belgium; during the match, Viviano was sent off in the 80th minute for a reactionary foul on Kevin Mirallas, after the latter had kicked the ball at him when play had stopped following Mousa Dembélé's goal, which took Belgium into the lead, and ultimately proved to be the match–winner.

After receiving his first senior call-up on 6 August 2010, ahead of Italy's friendly against Ivory Coast on 10 August, Viviano made his debut for Italy senior team on 7 September, during a UEFA Euro 2012 qualifying match, in a 5–0 victory against the Faroe Islands in Florence. At that time he became the second choice goalkeeper for Italy, only after veteran Gianluigi Buffon and ahead of Salvatore Sirigu, starting in Italy's October European qualifiers against Northern Ireland in Belfast (0–0) and Serbia in Genoa, with the latter match being abandoned after only seven minutes of play due to crowd trouble, after flares had been thrown by the fans onto the field, with one almost hitting Viviano; as result, Italy were handed a 3–0 victory.

Following an injury that had ruled him out of play for six months, Viviano was once again called up on 26 February 2012, ahead of Italy's friendly against United States three days later. On 13 May 2012, he was included in Cesare Prandelli's 32-man provisional squad for UEFA Euro 2012; however, he was later excluded from the final 23-man team on 28 May.

== Style of play ==
Considered by pundits and footballing figures to be a promising goalkeeper in his youth, who was even touted as a potential successor to Gianluigi Buffon with the Italy national team, Viviano is known for his penalty saving abilities as well as his reflexes and shot-stopping capabilities between the posts; his ability to come off his line to deal with high balls has been cited as an area in need of improvement, however. With 12 stops, he has saved the joint–ninth–highest number of penalties in Serie A history. In 2011, Kris Voakes of Goal.com described Viviano with the following words: "His 6ft 5in frame gives him a head start, but it is also thanks to his organisation, command of the area, anticipation and, naturally, his excellent shot-stopping abilities that he has become known as one of the best Serie A has to offer." He is also competent with the ball at his feet, which allows him to play the ball out from the back on the ground.

== Career statistics ==
=== Club ===
Appearances and goals by club, season and competition
Club	Season	League			National cup (Note: Includes Coppa Italia, Turkish Cup)		Europe		Other		Total	
Club	Season	Division	Apps	Goals	Apps	Goals	Apps	Goals	Apps	Goals	Apps	Goals
Cesena (loan)	2004–05	Serie B	13	0	0	0	—		—		13	0
Brescia	2005–06	Serie B	14	0	0	0	—		—		14	0
Brescia	2006–07	Serie B	40	0	5	0	—		—		45	0
Brescia	2007–08	Serie B	35	0	1	0	—		2	0	38	0
Brescia	2008–09	Serie B	37	0	1	0	—		3	0	41	0
Brescia	Total		126	0	7	0	—		5	0	138	0
Bologna	2009–10	Serie A	34	0	1	0	—		—		35	0
Bologna	2010–11	Serie A	38	0	0	0	—		—		38	0
Bologna	Total		72	0	1	0	—		—		73	0
Inter Milan	2011–12	Serie A	0	0	0	0	0	0	0	0	0	0
Palermo	2011–12	Serie A	20	0	0	0	—		—		20	0
Fiorentina (loan)	2012–13	Serie A	32	0	0	0	—		—		32	0
Arsenal (loan)	2013–14	Premier League	0	0	0	0	0	0	0	0	0	0
Sampdoria	2014–15	Serie A	29	0	1	0	—		—		30	0
Sampdoria	2015–16	Serie A	37	0	1	0	2 (Note: Appearances in UEFA Europa League)	0	—		40	0
Sampdoria	2016–17	Serie A	17	0	1	0	—		—		18	0
Sampdoria	2017–18	Serie A	27	0	0	0	—		—		27	0
Sampdoria	Total		110	0	3	0	2	0	—		115	0
Sporting CP	2018–19	Primeira Liga	0	0	0	0	0	0	0	0	0	0
SPAL (loan)	2018–19	Serie A	17	0	0	0	—		—		17	0
Fatih Karagümrük	2020–21	Süper Lig	32	0	0	0	—		—		32	0
Fatih Karagümrük	2021–22	Süper Lig	38	0	2	0	—		—		40	0
Fatih Karagümrük	2022–23	Süper Lig	17	0	1	0	—		—		18	0
Fatih Karagümrük	Total		87	0	3	0	—		—		90	0
Ascoli	2023–24	Serie B	27	0	0	0	—		—		27	0
Career total			504	0	14	0	2	0	5	0	525	0

=== International ===
Appearances and goals by national team and year
National team	Year	Apps	Goals
Italy
Italy	2010	4	0
Italy	2011	2	0
Total		6	0
