= Milan Škriniar =

Slovak footballer (born 1995)

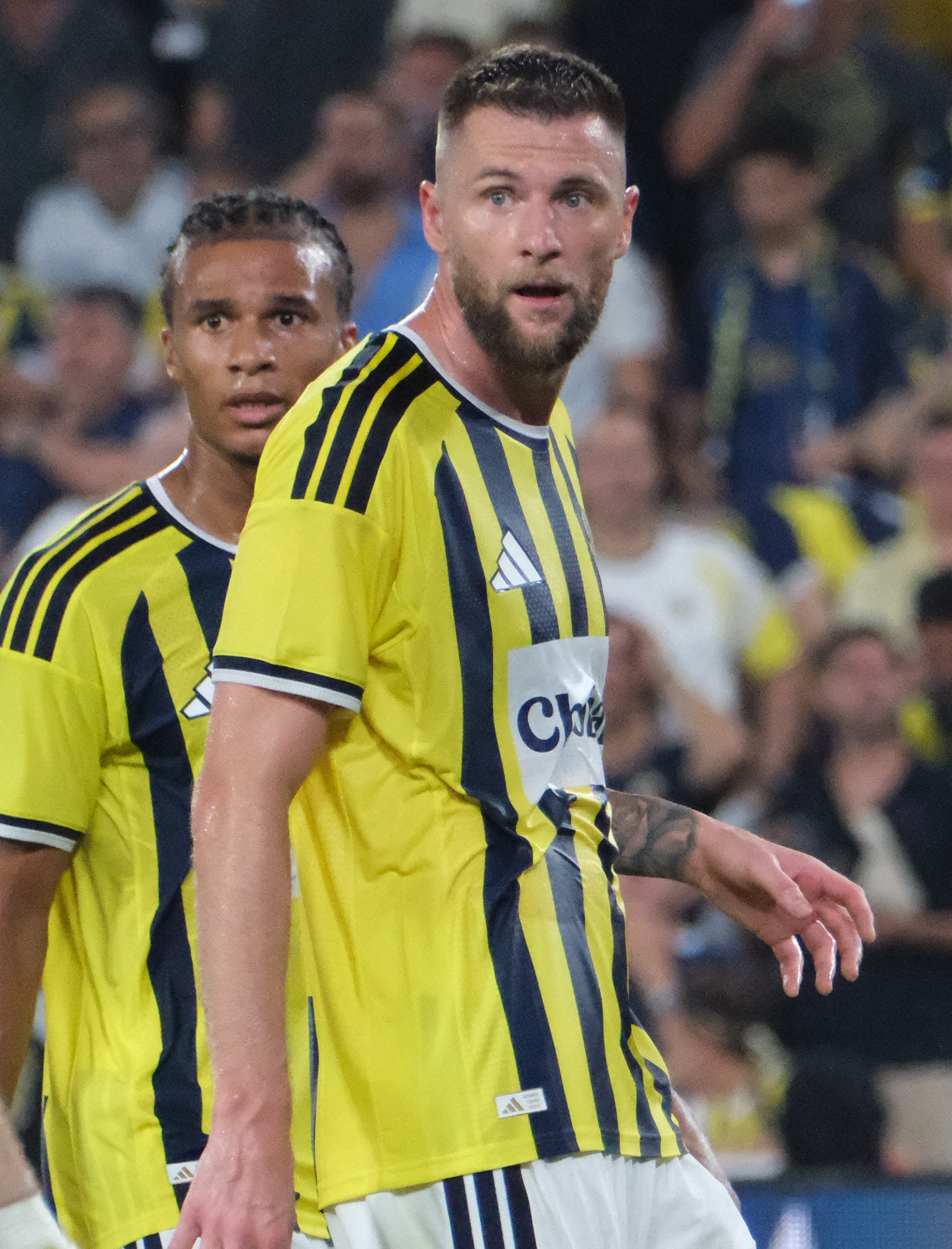
- Škriniar with Fenerbahçe in 2026

Personal information
- Full name: Milan Škriniar
- Date of birth: 11 February 1995 (age 31)
- Place of birth: Žiar nad Hronom, Slovakia
- Height: 1.87 m (6 ft 2 in)
- Position: Centre-back

Team information
- Current team: Fenerbahçe
- Number: 37

Youth career
- 2006–2007: Žiar nad Hronom
- 2008–2012: Žilina

Senior career*
Years	Team	Apps	(Gls)
2012–2016	Žilina	77	(12)
2012–2013	→ Zlaté Moravce (loan)	7	(0)
2016–2017	Sampdoria	38	(0)
2017–2023	Inter Milan	193	(10)
2023–2025	Paris Saint-Germain	29	(0)
2025	→ Fenerbahçe (loan)	16	(3)
2025–	Fenerbahçe	35	(3)

International career^{‡}
2011	Slovakia U17	3	(0)
2012–2013	Slovakia U18	5	(0)
2013–2014	Slovakia U19	3	(0)
2012–2017	Slovakia U21	19	(3)
2016–	Slovakia	92	(3)
- * Club domestic league appearances and goals as of 8 November 2026 ‡ National team caps and goals as of 14:10, 15 November 2026 (UTC)

Milan Škriniar (born 11 February 1995) is a Slovak professional footballer who plays as a centre-back for and captains both the Süper Lig club Fenerbahçe and the Slovakia national team.

Škriniar began his career in his native Slovakia with Žilina. He also underwent a loan spell at ViOn Zlaté Moravce early in his career. In 2016, Škriniar moved to Italy with Sampdoria, where he would play for a season before joining league rivals Internazionale. Škriniar went on to win one Serie A, two Coppa Italia, and two Supercoppa Italiana titles for the Nerazzurri, eventually becoming the team's captain. He joined French club Paris Saint-Germain in 2023, and Turkish club Fenerbahçe in 2025.

As a youth international, Škriniar represented Slovakia at under-17, under-18, under-19, and under-21 level. In May 2016, at the age of 21, he made his senior Slovakia debut, and was selected for the team representing his country at UEFA Euro 2016. Škriniar later played for Slovakia at Euro 2020 and Euro 2024.

== Club career ==
=== MŠK Žilina ===
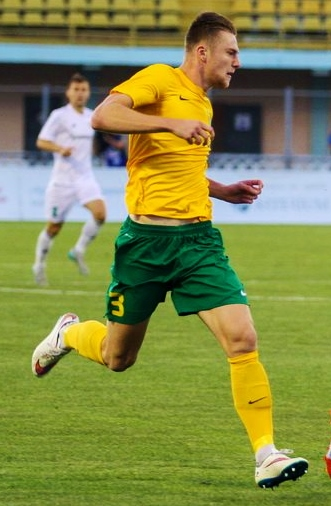
Škriniar playing for Žilina in 2015

Škriniar began his career in the youth structures of Žiar nad Hronom before joining the youth setup of Žilina at 12 years old. He made his official Slovak Super Liga debut for the first team on 27 March 2012 aged 17 years and 49 days, in a match against ViOn Zlaté Moravce. On 23 November 2012, he scored his first goal in the Slovak Super Liga against ViOn during a 4–1 victory.

Škriniar was sent on loan for half a season to ViOn Zlaté Moravce in February 2013 to gain more first-team experience.

=== Sampdoria ===
On 29 January 2016, Sampdoria announced the signing of Milan Škriniar on a four-and-a-half-year contract. He made his debut in a 2–1 home victory over Lazio in late April. During the next season Škriniar played a key role for Marco Giampaolo's Blucerchiati, finishing the campaign as the youngest defender to have made at least 35 appearances in Serie A.

=== Inter Milan ===
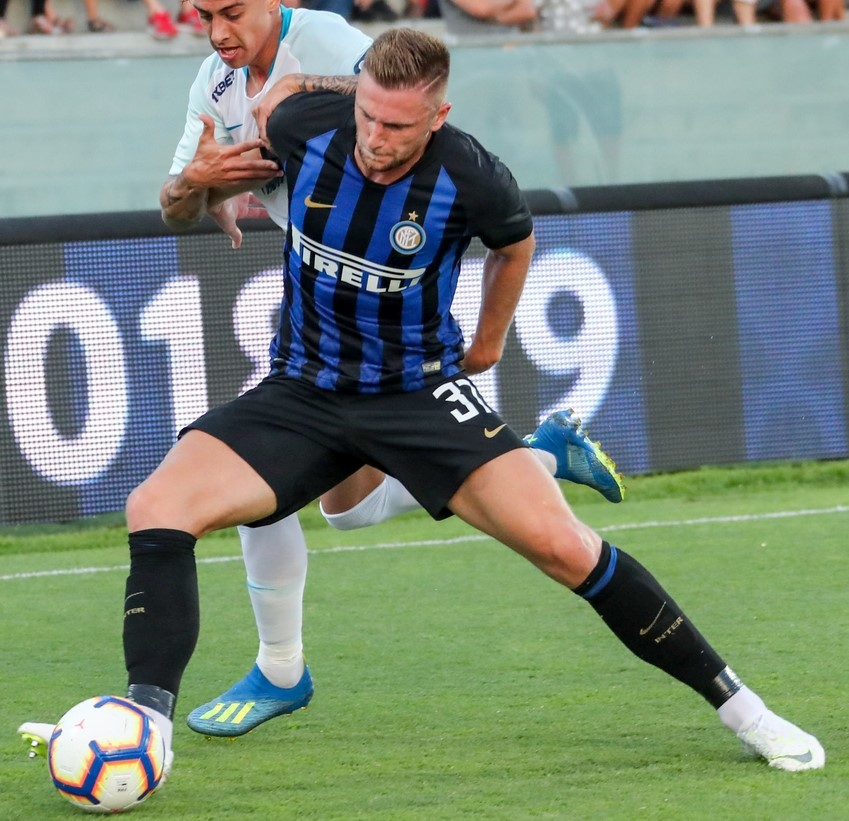
Škriniar playing for Inter Milan in 2018

On 7 July 2017, Škriniar completed a transfer to fellow Serie A side Inter Milan signing a five-year contract. The club paid a reported fee around €20 million and also included the striker Gianluca Caprari. The transfer made Škriniar the most expensive Slovak player of all time. He was presented four days later and received squad number 37, stating: "It's amazing to think that in 18 months I've gone from the Slovak league to playing for a club like Inter."

Škriniar made his competitive debut for the club on 20 August in the opening matchday of 2017–18 Serie A against Fiorentina as Inter won 3–0 at San Siro. He scored his first Serie A goal later on 16 September against Crotone, the opener in the 82nd minute with a right-footed shot in an eventual 2–0 away win to keep Inter's winning streak. His second of the campaign came in matchday 10 against his former side Sampdoria on 24 October, netting again the opener as Inter won 3–2.

Škriniar was distinguished for his performances in the first part of the season, being one of the best players of the squad. He continued with his great performances even in the second part of the season, which proved clinical for the team, which returned to UEFA Champions League after six years.

In the 2018–19 season, Škriniar made his debut in the UEFA Champions League on 18 September in the opening group stage match against Tottenham Hotspur, playing full-90 minutes in a 2–1 comeback win at San Siro. On 2 November 2019, in a Serie A match against Bologna which ended in a 2–1 away win, Škriniar made his 100th appearance in all competitions for Inter, all of them as starter. On 3 November 2021, Škriniar scored his first UEFA Champions League goal in a 3–1 away win against Sheriff Tiraspol.

In an interview with Slovak football federation website Futbalsfz.sk on 29 January 2023, Škriniar confirmed that he had signed a pre-contract agreement with Ligue 1 club Paris Saint-Germain. Negotiations took place between Inter Milan and PSG to transfer Škriniar during the January transfer window, but they eventually broke down. He was subsequently stripped of the captaincy by manager Simone Inzaghi. In February, Škriniar suffered a lower back injury, which was later revealed to be a lumbar vertebra fracture. He underwent surgery for the fracture in April, missing the quarter-finals and semi-finals of the Champions League. In the 2023 UEFA Champions League final on 10 June, Škriniar was left on the bench as Inter was defeated 1–0 by Manchester City.

On 30 June 2023, Inter Milan announced the departure of Škriniar as a free agent at the end of 2022–23 season, after six years with the club.

=== Paris Saint-Germain ===
On 6 July 2023, Paris Saint-Germain officially confirmed that Škriniar had joined the club, signing a five-year contract until 30 June 2028. He became the first Slovak to play for the club. Škriniar made his debut in a 0–0 league draw against Lorient at the Parc des Princes on 12 August. On 7 November 2023, Škriniar scored his first goal for PSG in a 2–1 loss against AC Milan in the group stage of the Champions League.

=== Fenerbahçe ===
On 30 January 2025, Škriniar joined Süper Lig club Fenerbahçe on loan for the remainder of the 2024–25 season. On 2 February 2025, he made his Süper Lig debut against Çaykur Rizespor match in a 3–2 home win.

On 31 July 2025, he signed for Fenerbahçe on a four-year contract. The club paid a reported fee of €7 million, not included €3 million in potential add-ons. On 6 August 2025, he captained first time of the team in 2025–26 UEFA Champions League third qualifying rounds first match, a 2–1 away loss to Feyenoord.

== International career ==
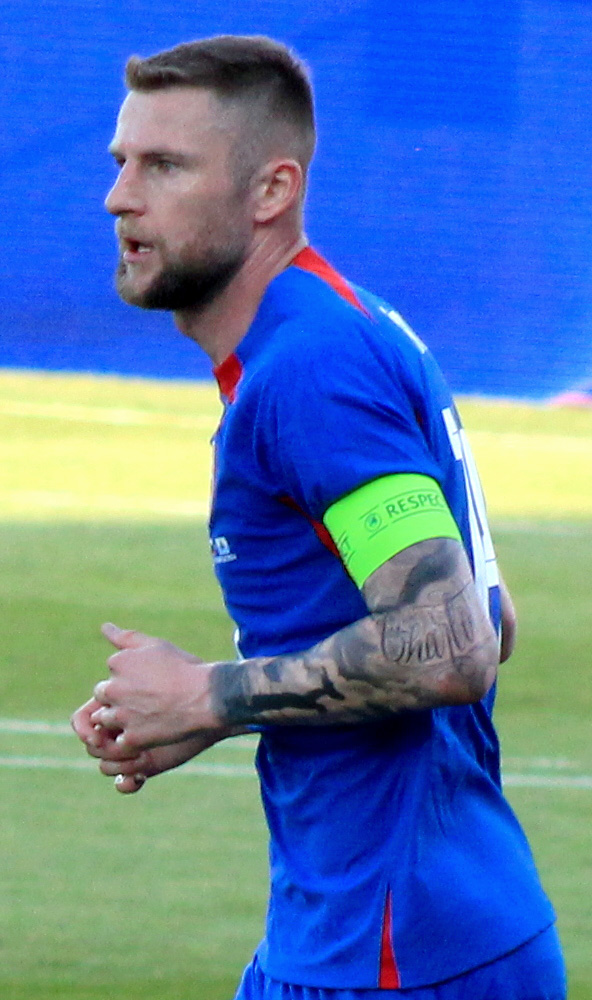
Škriniar with Slovakia in 2024

Having represented various Slovak youth teams, Škriniar debuted for the senior squad in a friendly 3–1 victory over Georgia on 27 May 2016. He was selected as part of the Slovakia squad for UEFA Euro 2016.

After the international retirement of Ján Ďurica in November 2017, Škriniar took his place as a centre-back partner to Martin Škrtel in the national team, even directing Slovak defence in Škrtel's absences (for example, in a double fixture against Netherlands and Morocco despite his relatively young age, compared to veteran defenders Peter Pekarík and Tomáš Hubočan).

On 27 March 2021, Škriniar scored his first international goal during a 2022 FIFA World Cup qualification against Malta, ending in a 2–2 draw. Following the international retirement of national team captain Marek Hamšík, Škriniar was appointed captain of the team in June 2022. National team coach Štefan Tarkovič highlighted Škriniar's leadership qualities during the announcement.

== Style of play ==
Škriniar has been described as a defender who is "a strong tackler who is quick to make clearances". A natural centre-back, he can also be deployed as a defensive midfielder where he also produced outstanding performances with under-21 side. His former youth manager said of him: He [Škriniar] has always been the leader on and off the pitch. He has been described in the media as the successor to former Liverpool icon Martin Škrtel in Slovakia's defensive line. He has also drawn praise from several Italian pundits for his positional sense, as well as his ability in the air, and in one on one situations. newspaper L'Équipe has highlighted Škriniar's high pass and long pass accuracy, his complexity and low injury proneness and imposing figure.

== Personal life ==
Škriniar has been in a relationship with model and a former volleyball player Barbora Hrončeková since 2014. Their daughter Charlotte was born in 2020 and they married in Halič in July 2023. Škriniar is a Roman Catholic.

== Career statistics ==
=== Club ===
As of match played 8 November 2026

Appearances and goals by club, season and competition
Club	Season	League			National cup (Note: Includes Slovak Cup, Coppa Italia, Coupe de France, Turkish Cup)		Europe		Other		Total	
Club	Season	Division	Apps	Goals	Apps	Goals	Apps	Goals	Apps	Goals	Apps	Goals
Žilina	2011–12	Slovak First League	2	0	1	0	0	0	—		3	0
Žilina	2012–13	Slovak First League	10	1	3	0	0	0	—		13	1
Žilina	2013–14	Slovak First League	15	1	1	0	1 (Note: Appearance(s) in UEFA Europa League)	0	—		17	1
Žilina	2014–15	Slovak First League	32	6	3	2	—		1 (Note: Appearance with Žilina B in Slovak II. Liga)	0	35	8
Žilina	2015–16	Slovak First League	18	4	1	1	8	0	—		27	5
Žilina	Total		77	12	9	3	9	0	1	0	95	15
Zlaté Moravce (loan)	2012–13	Slovak First League	7	0	0	0	—		—		7	0
Sampdoria	2015–16	Serie A	3	0	0	0	—		—		3	0
Sampdoria	2016–17	Serie A	35	0	0	0	—		—		35	0
Sampdoria	Total		38	0	0	0	—		—		38	0
Inter Milan	2017–18	Serie A	38	4	2	0	—		—		40	4
Inter Milan	2018–19	Serie A	35	0	2	0	9 (Note: Six appearances in UEFA Champions League, three appearances in UEFA Europa League)	0	—		46	0
Inter Milan	2019–20	Serie A	32	0	3	0	7 (Note: Six appearances in UEFA Champions League, one appearance in UEFA Europa League)	0	—		42	0
Inter Milan	2020–21	Serie A	32	3	4	0	3 (Note: Appearances in UEFA Champions League)	0	—		39	3
Inter Milan	2021–22	Serie A	35	3	4	0	8	1	1 (Note: Appearance in Supercoppa Italiana)	0	48	4
Inter Milan	2022–23	Serie A	21	0	1	0	8	0	1	0	31	0
Inter Milan	Total		193	10	16	0	35	1	2	0	246	11
Paris Saint-Germain	2023–24	Ligue 1	24	0	1	0	6	1	1 (Note: Appearance in Trophée des Champions)	0	32	1
Paris Saint-Germain	2024–25	Ligue 1	5	0	0	0	0	0	0	0	5	0
Paris Saint-Germain	Total		29	0	1	0	6	1	1	0	37	1
Fenerbahçe (loan)	2024–25	Süper Lig	16	3	3	0	4	0	—		23	3
Fenerbahçe	2025–26	Süper Lig	24	2	2	0	12 (Note: Four appearances in UEFA Champions League, eight appearances in UEFA Europa League)	0	2 (Note: Appearances in Turkish Super Cup)	0	40	2
Fenerbahçe	2026–27	Süper Lig	11	1	0	0	10	0	0	0	21	1
Fenerbahçe	Fenerbahçe total		51	6	5	0	26	0	2	0	84	6
Career total			395	28	31	3	76	2	6	0	508	33

=== International ===
As of match played 13 November 2026

Appearances and goals by national team and year
National team	Year	Apps	Goals
Slovakia	2016	7 (Note: Two appearances in UEFA Euro 2016)	0
Slovakia	2017	7	0
Slovakia	2018	9	0
Slovakia	2019	8	0
Slovakia	2020	5	0
Slovakia	2021	14 (Note: Three appearances and one goal in UEFA Euro 2020)	3
Slovakia	2022	8	0
Slovakia	2023	8	0
Slovakia	2024	11 (Note: Four appearances in UEFA Euro 2024)	0
Slovakia	2025	10	0
Slovakia	2026	5	0
Total		92	3

Slovakia score listed first, score column indicates score after each Škriniar goal.

List of international goals scored by Milan Škriniar
No.	Date	Venue	Cap	Opponent	Score	Result	Competition
1	27 March 2021	Štadión Antona Malatinského, Trnava, Slovakia	38	Malta	2–2	2–2	2022 FIFA World Cup qualification
2	30 March 2021	Štadión Antona Malatinského, Trnava, Slovakia	39	Russia	1–0	2–1	2022 FIFA World Cup qualification
3	14 June 2021	Krestovsky Stadium, Saint Petersburg, Russia	41	Poland	2–1	2–1	UEFA Euro 2020

== Honours ==
Žilina

- Slovak Super Liga: 2011–12
- Slovak Cup: 2011–12

Inter Milan

- Serie A: 2020–21
- Coppa Italia: 2021–22, 2022–23
- Supercoppa Italiana: 2021, 2022
- UEFA Champions League runner-up: 2022–23

Paris Saint-Germain

- Ligue 1: 2023–24, 2024–25
- Coupe de France: 2023–24
- Trophée des Champions: 2023

Fenerbahçe

- Turkish Super Cup: 2025

Individual

- Slovak Footballer of the Year: 2019, 2020, 2021, 2022
- Süper Lig Team of the Season: 2025–26
