= Francesco Fedato =

Italian footballer (born 1992)

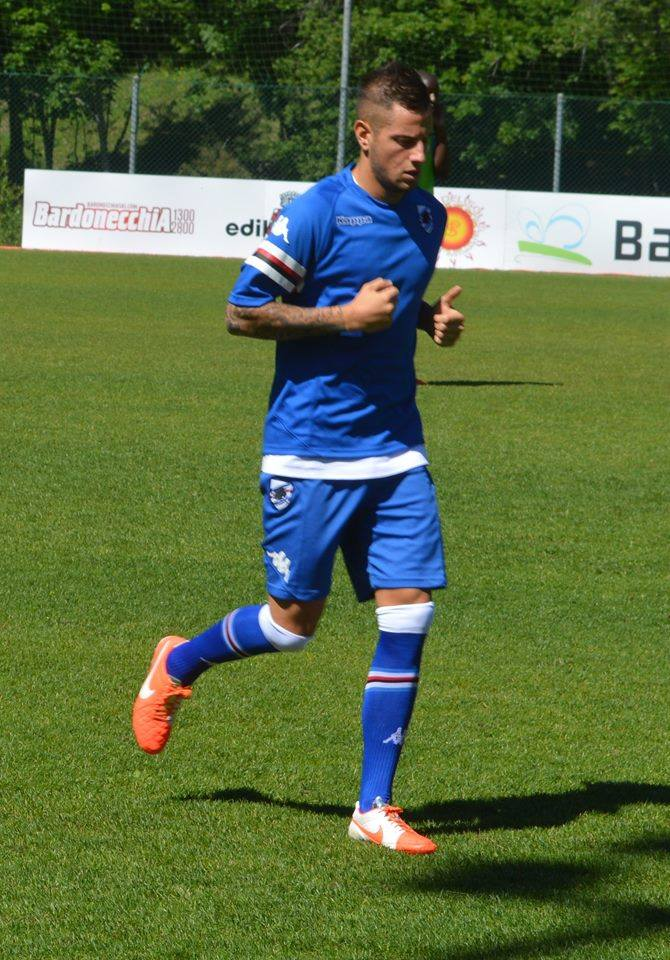

Personal information
- Date of birth: 15 October 1992 (age 34)
- Place of birth: Mirano, Italy
- Height: 1.77 m (5 ft 9 1/2 in)
- Position: Left winger

Team information
- Current team: Lucchese

Youth career
- –2011: Venezia
- 2011–2012: Lucchese

Senior career*
Years	Team	Apps	(Gls)
2012–2014	Bari	40	(8)
2014–2017	Sampdoria	1	(0)
2014	→ Catania (loan)	9	(0)
2015	→ Modena (loan)	20	(3)
2015–2016	→ Livorno (loan)	19	(3)
2016–2017	→ Bari (loan)	10	(0)
2017	→ Carpi (loan)	18	(0)
2017–2019	Foggia	17	(2)
2018–2019	→ Piacenza (loan)	14	(1)
2019	→ Trapani (loan)	16	(1)
2019–2020	Gozzano	22	(5)
2020–2021	Casertana	8	(1)
2021–2022	Gubbio	17	(1)
2021–2022	→ Lucchese (loan)	19	(4)
2022–2023	Vis Pesaro	31	(8)
2023–2025	Lucchese	31	(2)
2025–2026	Treviso	14	(2)
2026–	Lucchese		

International career
2013	Italy U20	1	(0)
2013–2014	Italy U21	4	(1)
- * Club domestic league appearances and goals as of 11 January 2026

Francesco Fedato (born 15 October 1992) is an Italian footballer who plays as a left winger for Eccellenza club Lucchese.

He previously played for Venezia, Lucchese, Bari, Catania and Modena.

== Career ==
Fedato began his career as a youth player of Venezia.

=== Bari ===
In July 2012, he joined Serie B side Bari in a co-ownership deal with Catania on a 3-year contract, for a peppercorn transfer fee of €500. Catania signed Fedato for free.

Fedato made his first team debut at Bari as a substitute in a 2–1 win against Pro Vercelli on 25 September 2012. In his debut season, he scored 6 goals in 26 league matches for Bari. On 19 June 2013 the co-ownership was renewed.

=== Sampdoria ===
On 31 January 2014, Serie A side Sampdoria bought Fedato from Bari for €900,000 on 4 1/2-year contract, while Catania retained 50% of the registration rights. Fedato also returned to Catania for the rest of 2013–14 Serie A in a temporary deal. Fedato received a call-up from Bari on the day he left for Sampdoria/Catania.

On 18 June 2014 the co-ownership deal was renewed. On 30 June 2014 he received a call-up to the pre-retreat camp of Sampdoria. On 8 January 2015 Fedato was signed by Serie B club Modena in a temporary deal. On 25 June 2015 Sampdoria purchased the remaining 50% of the registration rights of Fedato from Catania.

On 21 July 2015 he was signed by Livorno in a temporary deal.

=== Foggia ===
==== Loan to Trapani ====
On 9 January 2019, he joined Trapani on loan.

=== Serie C clubs ===
On 19 September 2019 he signed with Gozzano.

On 5 October 2020 he joined Casertana on a two-year contract.

On 29 January 2021 he moved to Gubbio. On 31 August 2021 he returned to Lucchese on loan.

On 4 August 2022, Fedato signed with Vis Pesaro for one year, with an option to extend.
