= Titas Krapikas =

Lithuanian footballer

Personal information
- Date of birth: 3 January 1999 (age 27)
- Place of birth: Kaunas, Lithuania
- Height: 1.94 m (6 ft 4 in)
- Position: Goalkeeper

Team information
- Current team: Sambenedettese
- Number: 12

Youth career
- –2015: NFA
- 2015–2019: Sampdoria

Senior career*
Years	Team	Apps	(Gls)
2016–2019	Sampdoria	0	(0)
2019–2021	Spezia	6	(0)
2021–2023	Ternana	2	(0)
2023–2024	Audace Cerignola	26	(0)
2024–2025	Messina	26	(0)
2025–2026	Gubbio	20	(0)
2026–	Sambenedettese	0	(0)

International career^{‡}
2015	Lithuania U17	3	(0)
2016–2017	Lithuania U19	9	(0)
2017–2020	Lithuania U21	21	(0)
2021–	Lithuania	1	(0)
- * Club domestic league appearances and goals as of 30 April 2026 ‡ National team caps and goals as of 30 January 2022

Titas Krapikas (born 3 January 1999) is a Lithuanian professional footballer who plays as a goalkeeper for Italian Serie C Group B club Sambenedettese.

== Club career ==
Krapikas joined Italian club Sampdoria in 2015 and began playing for their Under-19 squad in the 2016–17 season. That same season, he was named on the bench for the senior squad on 22 occasions, but did not see time on the field. For the next two seasons, he mostly stayed with the junior squad, getting 11 call-ups to the senior team in total.

On 28 June 2019, he signed a three-year contract with an additional two-year extension option with Serie B club Spezia.

He made his Serie B debut for Spezia on 24 August 2019 in a game against Cittadella. He established himself as Spezia's first-choice goalkeeper early in the season before losing the starter spot to Simone Scuffet. In the 2020–21 Serie A season, he did not make any appearances in the league, with Ivan Provedel becoming the first-choice goalkeeper. Krapikas was the starter for four 2020–21 Coppa Italia games for Spezia, where the club reached the quarter-finals.

On 2 September 2021, he joined Serie B side Ternana, signing a two-year contract with the club.

On 1 September 2023, Krapikas joined Serie C club Audace Cerignola on a free transfer.

== International career ==
Krapikas started to play in the national youth teams of Lithuania in 2015. He played three matches with the U-17 team, two of them in the qualifications of European Under-17 Championship 2016 in Azerbaijan.

The following year, he moved to the U-19 team. He remained there for two years, playing nine times, two in the qualifications of the European Under-19 Championship 2017 in Georgia and three in the European Under-19 Championship 2018 in Finland.

In 2017 he began his performance in the U-21 team. After 5 friendly matches, on 7 September 2018, he debuted in the official race. He played in the qualification and main competition of European Under-21 Championship 2019 in Italy and San Marino. In the home game in Gargždai against Georgia, where he played as a starter, the final score was 0–0.

He was first called up to the Lithuania national football team in June 2021 for friendlies. He made his debut on 15 November 2021 in a friendly against Kuwait.
