= Stanley Amuzie =

Nigerian professional footballer

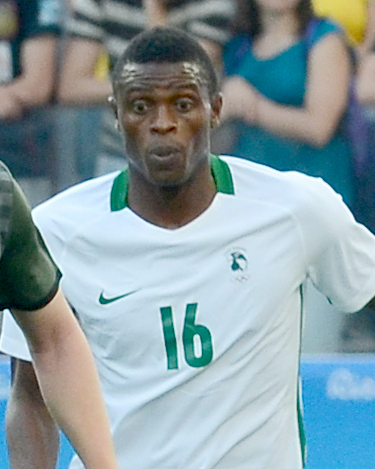
- Amuzie at the 2016 Olympics

Personal information
- Full name: Stanley Amuzie
- Date of birth: 28 February 1996 (age 30)
- Place of birth: Lagos, Nigeria
- Height: 1.86 m (6 ft 1 in)
- Positions: Centre-back; left-back

Youth career
- –2014: Parma
- 2014–2015: Sampdoria

Senior career*
Years	Team	Apps	(Gls)
2015–2016	Olhanense	13	(1)
2016–2018	Sampdoria	0	(0)
2017–2018	→ Lugano (loan)	13	(0)
2018–2019	Lugano	3	(0)
2019–2020	Aluminij	28	(0)
2020	FF Jaro	18	(0)
2021	KPV	24	(1)

International career
2016	Nigeria U23	6	(0)
2016	Nigeria	2	(0)
Medal record
Olympic Games
Bronze medal – third place	2016 Rio de Janeiro	Team
- * Club domestic league appearances and goals as of 21:13, 21 December 2020 (UTC)

Stanley Amuzie (born 28 February 1996) is a Nigerian professional footballer who plays as a centre-back or left-back.

== Club career ==
In August 2017, Amuzie moved on loan from Sampdoria to Lugano.

== International career ==
Amuzie was selected by Nigeria national under-23 football team for their 35-man provisional squad for the 2016 Summer Olympics. He debuted for the senior Nigeria national football team in a 1–1 2017 Africa Cup of Nations qualification tie against Egypt on 25 March 2016.

== Personal life ==
In 2026, the District Court of Helsinki sentenced him to two years and two months of unconditional imprisonment for a rape that took place at a hotel in Helsinki, Finland, in 2020.

== Career statistics ==
As of 11 June 2024

Appearances and goals by club, season and competition
Club	Season	League			National cup (Note: Includes Swiss Cup, Slovenian Cup, Suomen Cup)		Continental		Other		Total	
Club	Season	Division	Apps	Goals	Apps	Goals	Apps	Goals	Apps	Goals	Apps	Goals
Olhanense	2015–16	LigaPro	13	1	–		–		–		13	1
Sampdoria	2016–17	Serie A	0	0	0	0	–		–		0	0
Lugano (loan)	2017–18	Swiss Super League	13	0	1	0	–		–		14	0
Lugano	2018–19	Swiss Super League	3	0	1	0	–		–		4	0
Aluminij	2018–19	Slovenian PrvaLiga	15	0	2	0	–		–		17	0
Aluminij	2019–20	Slovenian PrvaLiga	13	0	3	0	–		–		16	0
Aluminij	Total		28	0	5	0	0	0	0	0	33	0
Jaro	2020	Ykkönen	18	0	–		–		–		18	0
KPV	2021	Ykkönen	24	1	3	0	–		–		27	1
Career total			99	2	10	0	0	0	0	0	109	2

== Honours ==
Nigeria U23

- Olympic Bronze Medal: 2016
