= Vasco Regini =

Italian footballer (born 1990)

Personal information
- Full name: Vasco Regini
- Date of birth: 9 September 1990 (age 36)
- Place of birth: Cesena, Italy
- Height: 1.85 m (6 ft 1 in)
- Positions: Left-back; centre-back

Team information
- Current team: Sorrento (technical assistant coach)

Senior career*
Years	Team	Apps	(Gls)
2007–2009	Cesena	10	(0)
2009–2012	Sampdoria	1	(0)
2010–2011	→ Foggia (loan)	31	(1)
2011–2012	→ Empoli (loan)	32	(0)
2012–2013	Empoli	41	(0)
2013–2021	Sampdoria	125	(0)
2016	→ Napoli (loan)	1	(0)
2019	→ SPAL (loan)	4	(0)
2020	→ Parma (loan)	2	(0)
2021–2022	Reggina	8	(0)
2022–2023	Rimini	27	(0)
2023–2024	Sestri Levante	20	(0)

International career
2008–2011	Italy U20	13	(0)
2011	Italy U21 Serie B	2	(0)
2013	Italy U21	5	(0)

Managerial career
- 2024–: Sorrento
- * Club domestic league appearances and goals

Vasco Regini (born 9 September 1990) is an Italian professional football coach and a former left-back. He is a technical assistant coach with Sorrento.

== Club career ==
Regini made his Serie A debut for Sampdoria on 9 May 2009 in a game against Reggina. He was successively acquired on loan by Lega Pro Prima Divisione club Foggia later in August 2010.

On 31 January 2020, he joined Parma on loan.

On 13 July 2021, he signed a one-year contract with Reggina. The contract was terminated by mutual consent on 31 January 2022.

On 26 August 2022, Regini signed a two-year deal with Rimini.

== International career ==
Regini was a member of Italy U-20 team from 2008 to 2011. In 2011–12 season he played twice for Italy under-21 Serie B representative team plus another unofficial charity match against Italy U20. All three match Regini was the captain.

== Career statistics ==
=== Club ===
As of match played 22 May 2021

Club	Season	League	League		Cup		Europe		Other		Total	
Club	Season	League	Apps	Goals	Apps	Goals	Apps	Goals	Apps	Goals	Apps	Goals
Cesena	2007–08	Serie B	7	0	–		–		–		7	0
Cesena	2008–09	Lega Pro	3	0	2	0	–		–		5	0
Cesena	Total		10	0	2	0	0	0	0	0	12	0
Sampdoria	2008–09	Serie A	1	0	–		–		–		1	0
Sampdoria	2009–10	Serie A	0	0	–		–		–		0	0
Foggia	2010–11	Lega Pro	31	1	–		–		–		31	1
Empoli	2011–12	Serie B	32	0	3	0	–		–		35	0
Empoli	2012–13	Serie B	41	1	1	0	–		4	0	46	1
Empoli	Total		73	1	4	0	0	0	4	0	81	1
Sampdoria	2013–14	Serie A	29	0	2	0	–		–		31	0
Sampdoria	2014–15	Serie A	28	0	2	0	–		–		30	0
Sampdoria	2015–16	Serie A	14	0	1	0	1	0	–		16	0
Napoli	2015–16	Serie A	1	0	0	0	–		–		1	0
Sampdoria	2016–17	Serie A	34	0	3	0	–		–		37	0
Sampdoria	2017–18	Serie A	14	0	3	0	–		–		17	0
Sampdoria	2019–20	Serie A	3	0	1	0	–		–		4	0
Sampdoria	2020–21	Serie A	3	0	1	0	–		–		4	0
Sampdoria	Total		126	0	13	0	1	0	0	0	140	0
SPAL	2018–19	Serie A	4	0	0	0	–		–		4	0
Parma	2019–20	Serie A	2	0	0	0	–		–		2	0
Career total			247	2	19	0	1	0	4	0	271	2
