= Football at the 2016 Summer Olympics =

Football at the Games of the XXXI Olympiad
- Football pictogram for the 2016 Summer Olympics

Event details
- Games: 2016 Summer Olympics
- Host country: Brazil
- Dates: 3–20 August 2016
- Venues: 7 (in 6 host cities)
- Competitors: 473 from 23 nations

Men's tournament
- Teams: 16 (from 6 confederations)
Medalists
Gold	Brazil
Silver	Germany
Bronze	Nigeria

Women's tournament
- Teams: 12 (from 6 confederations)
Medalists
Gold	Germany
Silver	Sweden
Bronze	Canada

Editions
- ← 2012 2020 →

The association football tournament at the 2016 Summer Olympics was held from 3 to 20 August in Brazil.

In addition to the Olympic host city of Rio de Janeiro, matches were played in Belo Horizonte, Brasília, Salvador, São Paulo, and Manaus. All six cities hosted matches during the 2014 World Cup, with the Estádio Olímpico João Havelange in Rio de Janeiro the only Olympic venue not to have been a World Cup venue.

Associations affiliated with FIFA might send teams to participate in the tournament. Men's teams were restricted to under-23 players (born on or after 1 January 1993) with a maximum of three overage players allowed, while there were no age restrictions on women's teams. The Games made use of about 400 footballs.

== Competition schedule ==
The match schedule of the men's and women's tournament was unveiled on 10 November 2015.

GS	Group stage	QF	Quarter-finals	SF	Semi-finals	B	Bronze medal match	F	Gold medal match

Date Event	Wed 3	Thu 4	Fri 5	Sat 6	Sun 7	Mon 8	Tue 9	Wed 10	Thu 11	Fri 12	Sat 13	Sun 14	Mon 15	Tue 16	Wed 17	Thu 18	Fri 19		Sat 20	
Men		GS			GS			GS			QF				SF				B	F
Women	GS			GS			GS			QF				SF			B	F		

== Venues ==
Rio de Janeiro hosted preliminary matches at the Estádio Olímpico João Havelange and the women's and men's final at the Maracanã Stadium on 19 and 20 August. Apart from Rio de Janeiro the five other cities were: São Paulo, Belo Horizonte, Brasília, Salvador, and Manaus, which were all host cities during the 2014 FIFA World Cup. The final choice of venues was announced by FIFA on 16 March 2015.

Rio de Janeiro		Brasília	São Paulo
Estádio do Maracanã	Estádio Olímpico João Havelange	Estádio Nacional Mané Garrincha	Arena Corinthians
Capacity: 74,738 (Note: Renovated for the 2014 World Cup)	Capacity: 60,000 (Note: Renovated for the 2016 Olympics)	Capacity: 69,349	Capacity: 48,234 (Note: New stadium for the 2014 World Cup)
Belo Horizonte	Location of the host cities of the football at the 2016 Summer Olympics.		
Estádio Mineirão	Location of the host cities of the football at the 2016 Summer Olympics.		
Capacity: 58,170	Location of the host cities of the football at the 2016 Summer Olympics.		
Salvador	Location of the host cities of the football at the 2016 Summer Olympics.		
Itaipava Arena Fonte Nova	Location of the host cities of the football at the 2016 Summer Olympics.		
Capacity: 51,900	Location of the host cities of the football at the 2016 Summer Olympics.		
Manaus	Location of the host cities of the football at the 2016 Summer Olympics.		
Arena da Amazônia	Location of the host cities of the football at the 2016 Summer Olympics.		
Capacity: 40,549	Location of the host cities of the football at the 2016 Summer Olympics.		

=== Training venues ===
Event stadium	Training venue #1	Training venue #2	Training venue #3	Training venue #4
Estádio do Maracanã	CFZ Stadium	Vasco Barra Football Club	Juliano Moreira Sports Complex	—N/a
Estádio Nacional Mané Garrincha	Cave Stadium	Minas Brasília Tennis Club	Yacht Club of Brasília	Cruzeiro Stadium
Estádio Mineirão	Toca da Raposa 1	Toca da Raposa 2	Cidade do Galo	América F.C. Training Center
Itaipava Arena Fonte Nova	Parque Santiago Stadium	Pituaçu Stadium	Barradão Stadium	E.C. Bahia Training Center
Arena Corinthians	São Paulo F.C. Training Center	S.E. Palmeiras Training Center	C.A. Juventus Stadium	Nacional A.C. Stadium

== Qualification ==
=== Summary ===
Nation	Men's	Women's	Athletes
Algeria	Yes		22
Argentina	Yes		22
Australia		Yes	22
Brazil	Yes	Yes	44
Canada		Yes	22
China		Yes	22
Colombia	Yes	Yes	44
Denmark	Yes		22
France		Yes	22
Fiji	Yes		22
Germany	Yes	Yes	44
Honduras	Yes		22
Iraq	Yes		22
Japan	Yes		22
South Korea	Yes		22
Mexico	Yes		22
Nigeria	Yes		22
New Zealand		Yes	22
Portugal	Yes		22
South Africa	Yes	Yes	44
Sweden	Yes	Yes	44
United States		Yes	22
Zimbabwe		Yes	22
Total: 23 NOCs	16	12	616

=== Men's qualification ===
In addition to host nation Brazil, 15 men's national teams qualified from six separate continental confederations. FIFA ratified the distribution of spots at the executive committee meeting in March 2014.

Means of qualification	Dates^{1}	Venue^{1}	Berths	Qualified
Host country	2 October 2009	Denmark	1	Brazil
2015 South American Youth Championship	14 January – 7 February 2015	Uruguay	1	Argentina
2015 UEFA European Under-21 Championship	17–30 June 2015	Czech Republic	4	Sweden
2015 UEFA European Under-21 Championship	17–30 June 2015	Czech Republic	4	Portugal
2015 UEFA European Under-21 Championship	17–30 June 2015	Czech Republic	4	Denmark
2015 UEFA European Under-21 Championship	17–30 June 2015	Czech Republic	4	Germany
2015 Pacific Games	3–17 July 2015	Papua New Guinea	1	Fiji^{2}
2015 CONCACAF Olympic Qualifying Championship	1–13 October 2015	United States	2	Mexico
2015 CONCACAF Olympic Qualifying Championship	1–13 October 2015	United States	2	Honduras
2015 Africa U-23 Cup of Nations	28 November – 12 December 2015	Senegal	3	Nigeria
2015 Africa U-23 Cup of Nations	28 November – 12 December 2015	Senegal	3	Algeria
2015 Africa U-23 Cup of Nations	28 November – 12 December 2015	Senegal	3	South Africa
2016 AFC U-23 Championship	12–30 January 2016	Qatar	3	Japan
2016 AFC U-23 Championship	12–30 January 2016	Qatar	3	South Korea
2016 AFC U-23 Championship	12–30 January 2016	Qatar	3	Iraq
2016 CONCACAF–CONMEBOL play-off	25–29 March 2016	Various (home and away)^{3}	1	Colombia
Total			16	

- ^1Dates and venues are those of final tournaments (or final round of qualification tournaments), various qualification stages may precede matches at these specific venues.
- ^2Nations making their Olympic tournament debut
- ^3One match each in Colombia and United States in a two-legged tie.

=== Women's qualification ===
In addition to host nation Brazil, 11 women's national teams qualified from six separate continental confederations. FIFA ratified the distribution of spots at the executive committee meeting in March 2014. Most continents use specific Olympic qualifying tournaments to allocate their spots, but two use slightly different procedures.

CONMEBOL used the 2014 Copa América Femenina as a qualifier for both the 2015 FIFA Women's World Cup and the Olympic tournament and, as Brazil was on the Olympics host country condition, they automatically qualified for the tournament and therefore the South American spot was given to second place in the tournament, Colombia.

UEFA used the 2015 FIFA Women's World Cup to determine its Olympic qualification. The top 3 European finishers at the World Cup, excluding England, qualified. When multiple European teams was eliminated on the same round, these results were a used as tie for the Olympic qualifying spots, and necessitated holding an Olympic Qualifying Tournament to give the last spot. As Germany and France both reached at least the quarterfinals and thus obtained qualification spots (England also did so, but was ineligible for the Olympic Games). The next best finishes for the European teams were a four-way tie among 4 teams: Netherlands, Norway, Sweden, and Switzerland, eliminated in the round of 16. With this unproceded situation, a round robin tournament to decide who would take the last spot for the Olympic Games was held and was won by Sweden.

Means of qualification	Dates^{4}	Venue^{4}	Berths	Qualified
Host country	2 October 2009	Denmark	1	Brazil
2014 Copa América	11–28 September 2014	Ecuador	1	Colombia
2015 FIFA World Cup (for UEFA eligible teams)^{5}	6 June – 5 July 2015	Canada	2	Germany
2015 FIFA World Cup (for UEFA eligible teams)^{5}	6 June – 5 July 2015	Canada	2	France
2015 CAF Olympic Qualifying Tournament	2–18 October 2015	Various (home and away)	2	South Africa
2015 CAF Olympic Qualifying Tournament	2–18 October 2015	Various (home and away)	2	Zimbabwe^{6}
2016 OFC Olympic Qualifying Tournament	23 January 2016	Papua New Guinea	1	New Zealand
2016 CONCACAF Olympic Qualifying Championship	10–21 February 2016	United States	2	United States
2016 CONCACAF Olympic Qualifying Championship	10–21 February 2016	United States	2	Canada
2016 AFC Olympic Qualifying Tournament	29 February – 9 March 2016	Japan	2	Australia
2016 AFC Olympic Qualifying Tournament	29 February – 9 March 2016	Japan	2	China
2016 UEFA Olympic Qualifying Tournament	2–9 March 2016	Netherlands	1	Sweden
Total			12	

- ^4Dates and venues are those of final tournaments (or final round of qualification tournaments), various qualification stages may precede matches at these specific venues.
- ^5England finished in the top three among UEFA teams in the World Cup, however England is not an IOC member and talks for them to compete as Great Britain broke down.
- ^6Nations making their Olympic tournament debut

== Men's competition ==
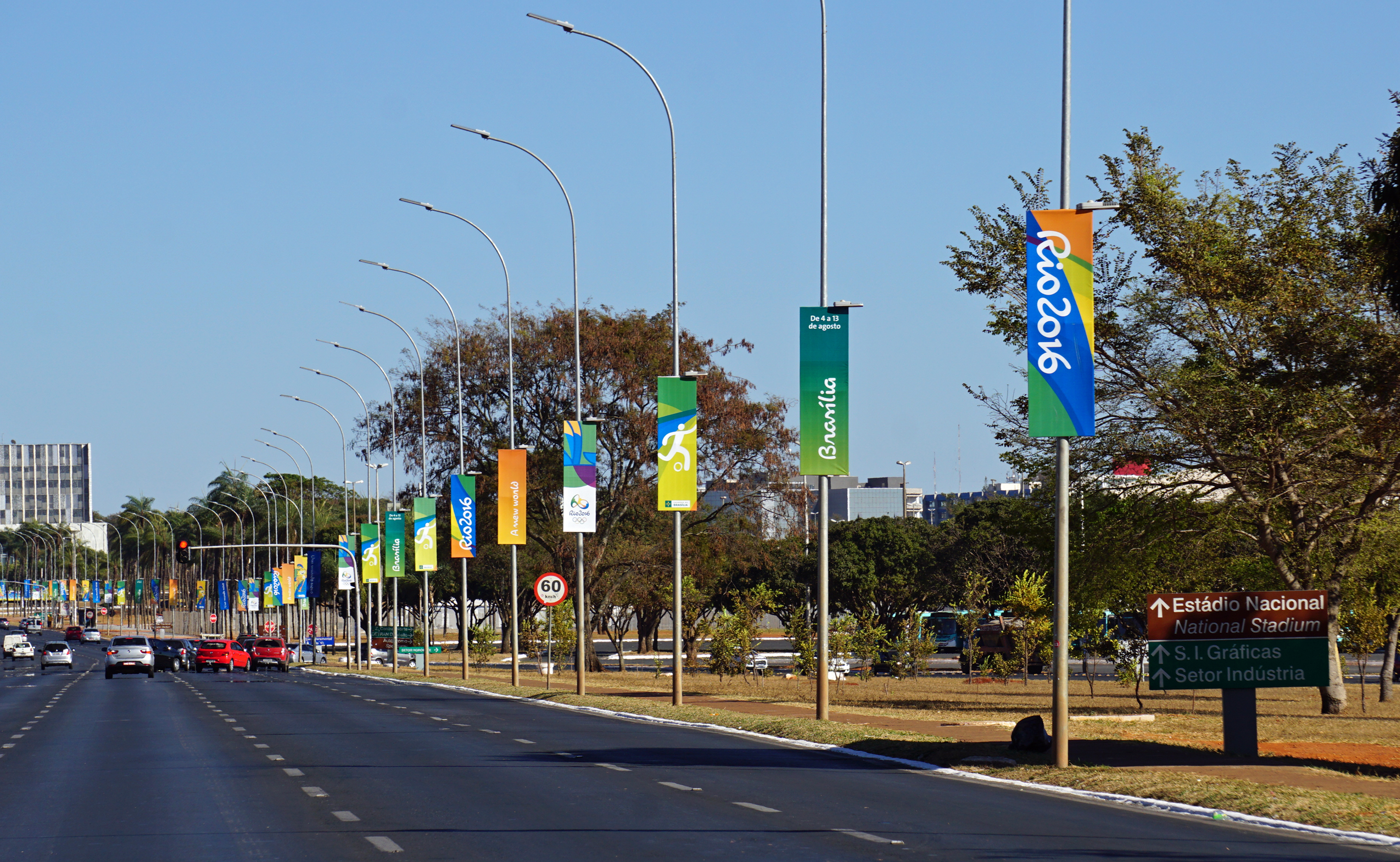
2016 Summer Olympics Visual Identity signs on Brasília's Monumental Axis, near Estádio Nacional Mané Garrincha, venue for 7 matches on men's tournament and 3 women's matches

The competition consisted of two stages; a group stage followed by a knockout stage.

=== Group stage ===
Teams were divided into four groups of four countries, playing each team in their group once. Three points were awarded for a victory, one for a draw. The top two teams per group qualified for the quarterfinals.

==== Group A ====
Pos	Team	Pld	W	D	L	GF	GA	GD	Pts	Qualification
1	Brazil (H)	3	1	2	0	4	0	+4	5	Quarter-finals
2	Denmark	3	1	1	1	1	4	−3	4	Quarter-finals
3	Iraq	3	0	3	0	1	1	0	3	
4	South Africa	3	0	2	1	1	2	−1	2	

Source: Rio2016 & FIFA
Rules for classification: Tiebreakers
(H) Hosts

==== Group B ====
Pos	Team	Pld	W	D	L	GF	GA	GD	Pts	Qualification
1	Nigeria	3	2	0	1	6	6	0	6	Quarter-finals
2	Colombia	3	1	2	0	6	4	+2	5	Quarter-finals
3	Japan	3	1	1	1	7	7	0	4	
4	Sweden	3	0	1	2	2	4	−2	1	

Source: Rio2016 & FIFA
Rules for classification: Tiebreakers

==== Group C ====
Pos	Team	Pld	W	D	L	GF	GA	GD	Pts	Qualification
1	South Korea	3	2	1	0	12	3	+9	7	Quarter-finals
2	Germany	3	1	2	0	15	5	+10	5	Quarter-finals
3	Mexico	3	1	1	1	7	4	+3	4	
4	Fiji	3	0	0	3	1	23	−22	0	

Source: Rio2016 & FIFA
Rules for classification: Tiebreakers

==== Group D ====
Pos	Team	Pld	W	D	L	GF	GA	GD	Pts	Qualification
1	Portugal	3	2	1	0	5	2	+3	7	Quarter-finals
2	Honduras	3	1	1	1	5	5	0	4	Quarter-finals
3	Argentina	3	1	1	1	3	4	−1	4	
4	Algeria	3	0	1	2	4	6	−2	1	

Source: Rio2016 & FIFA
Rules for classification: Tiebreakers

=== Knockout stage ===
Quarter-finals
13 August – São Paulo
Brazil	2
Colombia	0
13 August – Belo Horizonte
South Korea	0
Honduras	1
13 August – Salvador
Nigeria	2
Denmark	0
13 August – Brasília
Portugal	0
Germany	4

Semi-finals
17 August – Rio de Janeiro (Maracanã)
Brazil	6
Honduras	0
17 August – São Paulo
Nigeria	0
Germany	2

Gold medal match
20 August – Rio de Janeiro (Maracanã)
Brazil (p)	1 (5)
Germany	1 (4)
Bronze medal match
20 August – Belo Horizonte
Honduras	2
Nigeria	3

== Women's competition ==
The competition consisted of two stages; a group stage followed by a knockout stage.

=== Group stage ===
Teams were divided into three groups of four countries, playing each team in their group once. Three points were awarded for a victory, one for a draw. The top two teams per group and best two third-placed teams qualified for the quarterfinals.

==== Group E ====
Pos	Team	Pld	W	D	L	GF	GA	GD	Pts	Qualification
1	Brazil (H)	3	2	1	0	8	1	+7	7	Quarter-finals
2	China	3	1	1	1	2	3	−1	4	Quarter-finals
3	Sweden	3	1	1	1	2	5	−3	4	Quarter-finals
4	South Africa	3	0	1	2	0	3	−3	1	

Source: Rio2016 & FIFA
Rules for classification: Tiebreakers
(H) Hosts

==== Group F ====
Pos	Team	Pld	W	D	L	GF	GA	GD	Pts	Qualification
1	Canada	3	3	0	0	7	2	+5	9	Quarter-finals
2	Germany	3	1	1	1	9	5	+4	4	Quarter-finals
3	Australia	3	1	1	1	8	5	+3	4	Quarter-finals
4	Zimbabwe	3	0	0	3	3	15	−12	0	

Source: Rio2016 & FIFA
Rules for classification: Tiebreakers

==== Group G ====
Pos	Team	Pld	W	D	L	GF	GA	GD	Pts	Qualification
1	United States	3	2	1	0	5	2	+3	7	Quarter-finals
2	France	3	2	0	1	7	1	+6	6	Quarter-finals
3	New Zealand	3	1	0	2	1	5	−4	3	
4	Colombia	3	0	1	2	2	7	−5	1	

Source: Rio2016 & FIFA
Rules for classification: Tiebreakers

=== Knockout stage ===
Quarter-finals
12 August — Belo Horizonte
Brazil (p)	0 (7)
Australia	0 (6)
12 August — Brasília
United States	1 (3)
Sweden (p)	1 (4)
12 August — São Paulo
Canada	1
France	0
12 August — Salvador
China	0
Germany	1

Semi-finals
16 August — Rio de Janeiro (Maracanã)
Brazil	0 (3)
Sweden (p)	0 (4)
16 August — Belo Horizonte
Canada	0
Germany	2

Gold medal match
19 August — Rio de Janeiro (Maracanã)
Sweden	1
Germany	2
Bronze medal match
19 August — São Paulo
Brazil	1
Canada	2

== Medal summary ==
=== Medal table ===
* Host nation (Brazil)

Rank	Nation	Gold	Silver	Bronze	Total
1	Germany	1	1	0	2
2	Brazil*	1	0	0	1
3	Sweden	0	1	0	1
4	Canada	0	0	1	1
4	Nigeria	0	0	1	1
Totals (5 entries)		2	2	2	6

=== Medalists ===
Event	Gold	Silver	Bronze
Men	Brazil; Weverton; Zeca; Rodrigo Caio; Marquinhos; Renato Augusto; Douglas Santos; Luan Vieira; Rafinha; Gabriel Barbosa; Neymar; Gabriel Jesus; Walace; William; Luan Garcia; Rodrigo Dourado; Thiago Maia; Felipe Anderson; Uilson	Germany; Timo Horn; Jeremy Toljan; Lukas Klostermann; Matthias Ginter; Niklas Süle; Sven Bender; Max Meyer; Lars Bender; Davie Selke; Leon Goretzka; Julian Brandt; Jannik Huth; Philipp Max; Robert Bauer; Max Christiansen; Grischa Prömel; Serge Gnabry; Nils Petersen; Eric Oelschlägel	Nigeria; Daniel Akpeyi; Seth Sincere; Kingsley Madu; Shehu Abdullahi; Saturday Erimuya; William Troost-Ekong; Aminu Umar; Peter Etebo; Imoh Ezekiel; John Obi Mikel; Junior Ajayi; Saliu Popoola; Umar Sadiq; Azubuike Okechukwu; Ndifreke Udo; Stanley Amuzie; Muhammed Usman Edu; Emmanuel Daniel
Women	Germany; Almuth Schult; Josephine Henning; Saskia Bartusiak; Leonie Maier; Annike Krahn; Simone Laudehr; Melanie Behringer; Lena Goeßling; Alexandra Popp; Dzsenifer Marozsán; Anja Mittag; Tabea Kemme; Sara Däbritz; Babett Peter; Mandy Islacker; Melanie Leupolz; Isabel Kerschowski; Laura Benkarth; Svenja Huth	Sweden; Jonna Andersson; Emilia Appelqvist; Kosovare Asllani; Emma Berglund; Stina Blackstenius; Hilda Carlén; Lisa Dahlkvist; Magdalena Eriksson; Nilla Fischer; Pauline Hammarlund; Sofia Jakobsson; Hedvig Lindahl; Fridolina Rolfö; Elin Rubensson; Jessica Samuelsson; Lotta Schelin; Caroline Seger; Linda Sembrant; Olivia Schough	Canada; Stephanie Labbé; Allysha Chapman; Kadeisha Buchanan; Shelina Zadorsky; Quinn (Note: Then known as Rebecca Quinn); Deanne Rose; Rhian Wilkinson; Diana Matheson; Josée Bélanger; Ashley Lawrence; Desiree Scott; Christine Sinclair; Sophie Schmidt; Melissa Tancredi; Nichelle Prince; Janine Beckie; Jessie Fleming; Sabrina D'Angelo

== See also ==
- Football 5-a-side at the 2016 Summer Paralympics
- Football 7-a-side at the 2016 Summer Paralympics
