= 1912 in Brazilian football =

Football in Brazil
- Season: 1912

The following article presents a summary of the 1912 football (soccer) season in Brazil, the 11th season of competitive football in the country.

== Campeonato Paulista ==
Final Standings

Position	Team	Points	Played	Won	Drawn	Lost	For	Against	Difference
1	Americano-SP	18	11	7	4	0	25	9	16
2	Paulistano	15	10	7	1	2	28	15	13
3	Germânia	13	12	5	3	4	27	20	7
4	Mackenzie	12	10	5	2	3	35	19	16
5	SC Internacional de São Paulo	7	10	2	3	5	11	21	−10
6	São Paulo Athletic	7	11	3	1	7	16	28	−12
7	Ypiranga-SP	4	12	1	2	9	20	50	−30

Americano-SP declared as the Campeonato Paulista champions.

== State championship champions ==
State	Champion
Bahia	Atlético Futebol Clube
Rio de Janeiro (DF)	Paysandu-RJ (by LMSA); Botafogo (by AFRJ)
São Paulo	Americano-SP
