= Football at the 2016 Summer Olympics – Men's tournament =

2016 Men's Olympic Football Tournament

Tournament details
- Host country: Brazil
- Dates: 4–20 August
- Teams: 16 (from 6 confederations)
- Venues: 7 (in 6 host cities)

Final positions
- Champions: Brazil (1st title)
- Runners-up: Germany
- Third place: Nigeria
- Fourth place: Honduras

Tournament statistics
- Matches played: 32
- Goals scored: 104 (3.25 per match)
- Attendance: 1,008,426 (31,513 per match)
- Top scorer(s): (Germany) Serge Gnabry (Germany) Nils Petersen (6 goals each)
- Fair play award: Denmark

The men's football tournament at the 2016 Summer Olympics was held in Rio de Janeiro and five other cities in Brazil from 4 to 20 August 2016. It was the 26th edition of the men's Olympic football tournament. Together with the women's competition, the 2016 Summer Olympics football tournament was held in six cities in Brazil, including Olympic host city Rio de Janeiro, which hosted the final at Estádio do Maracanã. Teams participating in the men's competition were restricted to under-23 players (born on or after 1 January 1993) with a maximum of three overage players allowed.

In March 2016, it was agreed that the competition would be part of IFAB's trial to allow a fourth substitute to be made during extra time.

Brazil captured their first gold medal after defeating Germany on penalties. Nigeria won the bronze medal by beating Honduras 3–2. With the victory, Brazil became the second country after France to win all five FIFA 11-a-side men's titles (FIFA World Cup, FIFA Confederations Cup, FIFA U-20 World Cup, FIFA U-17 World Cup, and the Olympic football tournament).

== Competition schedule ==
The match schedule of the men's tournament was unveiled on 10 November 2015.

G	Group stage	¼	Quarter-finals	½	Semi-finals	B	Bronze medal match	F	Gold medal match

Thu 4	Fri 5	Sat 6	Sun 7	Mon 8	Tue 9	Wed 10	Thu 11	Fri 12	Sat 13	Sun 14	Mon 15	Tue 16	Wed 17	Thu 18	Fri 19	Sat 20	
G			G			G			¼				½			B	F

== Qualification ==
In addition to host nation Brazil, 15 men's national teams qualified from six separate continental confederations. FIFA ratified the distribution of spots at the executive committee meeting in March 2014.

Means of qualification	Dates^{1}	Venue^{1}	Berths	Qualified
Host country	2 October 2009	—N/a	1	Brazil
2015 South American Youth Championship	14 January – 7 February 2015	Uruguay	1	Argentina
2015 UEFA European Under-21 Championship	17–30 June 2015	Czech Republic	4	Sweden
2015 UEFA European Under-21 Championship	17–30 June 2015	Czech Republic	4	Portugal
2015 UEFA European Under-21 Championship	17–30 June 2015	Czech Republic	4	Denmark
2015 UEFA European Under-21 Championship	17–30 June 2015	Czech Republic	4	Germany
2015 Pacific Games	3–17 July 2015	Papua New Guinea	1	Fiji^{2}
2015 CONCACAF Olympic Qualifying Championship	1–13 October 2015	United States	2	Mexico
2015 CONCACAF Olympic Qualifying Championship	1–13 October 2015	United States	2	Honduras
2015 Africa U-23 Cup of Nations	28 November – 12 December 2015	Senegal	3	Nigeria
2015 Africa U-23 Cup of Nations	28 November – 12 December 2015	Senegal	3	Algeria
2015 Africa U-23 Cup of Nations	28 November – 12 December 2015	Senegal	3	South Africa
2016 AFC U-23 Championship	12–30 January 2016	Qatar	3	Japan
2016 AFC U-23 Championship	12–30 January 2016	Qatar	3	South Korea
2016 AFC U-23 Championship	12–30 January 2016	Qatar	3	Iraq
2016 CONCACAF–CONMEBOL play-off	25–29 March 2016	Colombia (first leg); United States (second leg)	1	Colombia
Total			16	

- ^1Dates and venues are those of final tournaments (or final round of qualification tournaments), various qualification stages may precede matches at these specific venues.
- ^2Nations making their Olympic tournament debut

== Match officials ==
On 2 May 2016, FIFA released the list of match referees that would officiate at the Olympics.

Confederation	Referee	Assistants
AFC	Fahad Al-Mirdasi (Saudi Arabia)	Abdullah Al-Shalwai (Saudi Arabia); Mohammed Al-Abakry (Saudi Arabia)
AFC	Alireza Faghani (Iran)	Reza Sokhandan (Iran); Mohammadreza Mansouri (Iran)
AFC	Ryuji Sato (Japan)	Toru Sagara (Japan); Hiroshi Yamauchi (Japan)
CAF	Gehad Grisha (Egypt)	Rédouane Achik (Morocco); Waleed Ahmed (Sudan)
CAF	Malang Diedhiou (Senegal)	Djibril Camara (Senegal); El Hadji Malick Samba (Senegal)
CONCACAF	Walter López Castellanos (Guatemala)	Leonel Leal (Costa Rica); Gerson López Castellanos (Guatemala)
CONCACAF	César Ramos (Mexico)	Marvin Torrentera (Mexico); Miguel Hernández (Mexico)
CONMEBOL	Néstor Pitana (Argentina)	Hernán Maidana (Argentina); Juan Pablo Belatti (Argentina)
CONMEBOL	Sandro Ricci (Brazil)	Emerson de Carvalho (Brazil); Marcelo Van Gasse (Brazil)
CONMEBOL	Roddy Zambrano (Ecuador)	Christian Lescano (Ecuador); Byron Romero (Ecuador)
OFC	Matthew Conger (New Zealand)	Simon Lount (New Zealand); Tevita Makasini (Tonga)
UEFA	Cüneyt Çakır (Turkey)	Bahattin Duran (Turkey); Tarık Ongun (Turkey)
UEFA	Ovidiu Hațegan (Romania)	Octavian Șovre (Romania); Sebastian Gheorghe (Romania)
UEFA	Sergei Karasev (Russia)	Tikhon Kalugin (Russia); Nikolay Golubev (Russia)
UEFA	Antonio Mateu Lahoz (Spain)	Pau Cebrián Devis (Spain); Roberto Díaz Pérez (Spain)
UEFA	Clément Turpin (France)	Frédéric Cano (France); Nicolas Danos (France)
Support Referee	Diego Haro (Peru)	
Support Referee	Joseph Lamptey (Ghana)	

== Venues ==
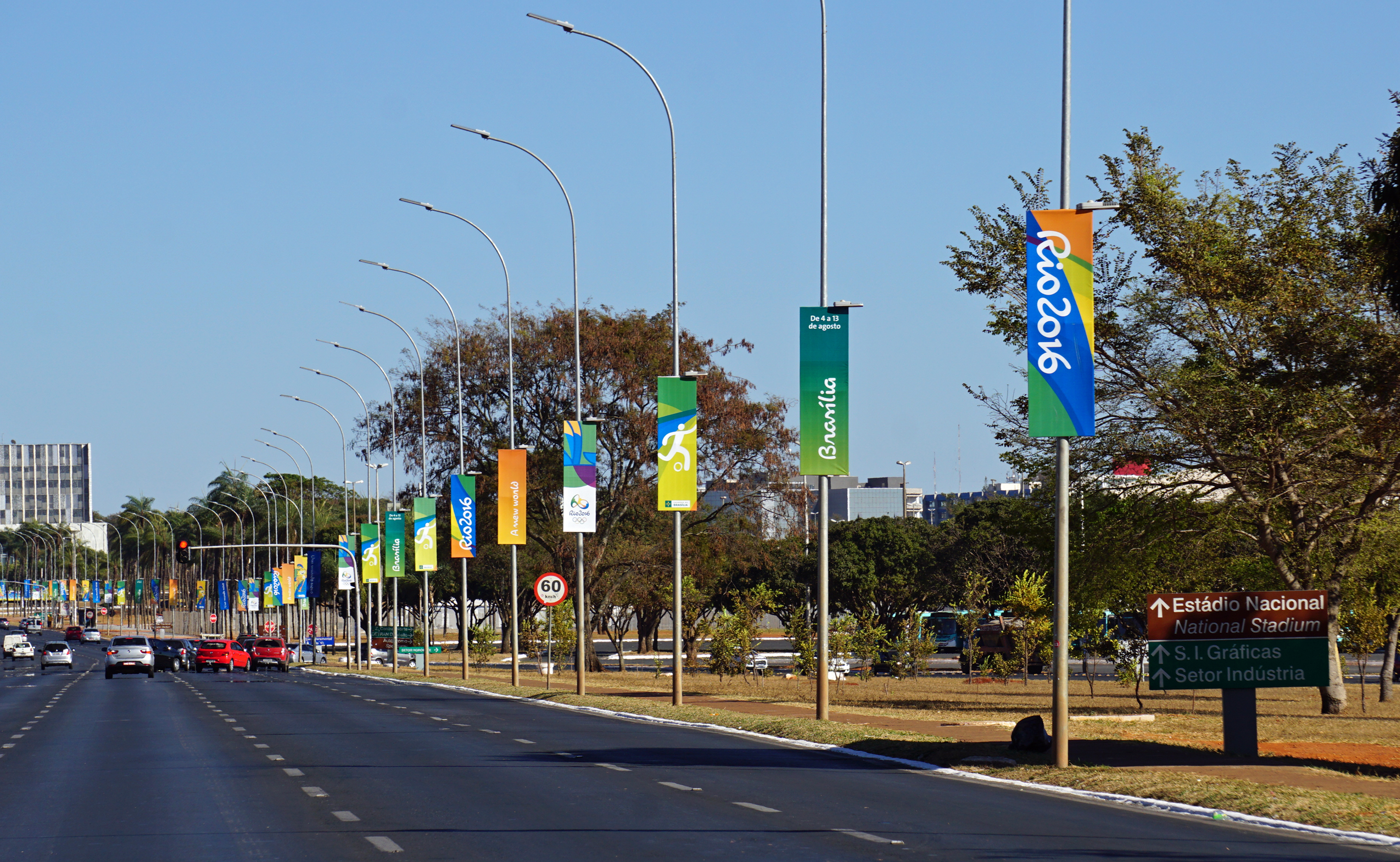
2016 Summer Olympics livery near Estádio Nacional Mané Garrincha in Brasília, venue for several matches.

Rio de Janeiro		Brasília	São Paulo
Estádio do Maracanã	Estádio Olímpico João Havelange	Estádio Nacional Mané Garrincha	Arena Corinthians
Capacity: 74,738 (Note: Renovated for the 2014 World Cup)	Capacity: 60,000 (Note: Renovated for the 2016 Olympics)	Capacity: 69,349	Capacity: 48,234 (Note: New stadium for the 2014 World Cup)
Belo Horizonte	Location of the host cities of the men's football tournament of the 2016 Summer Olympics.		
Estádio Mineirão	Location of the host cities of the men's football tournament of the 2016 Summer Olympics.		
Capacity: 58,170	Location of the host cities of the men's football tournament of the 2016 Summer Olympics.		
Salvador	Location of the host cities of the men's football tournament of the 2016 Summer Olympics.		
Itaipava Arena Fonte Nova	Location of the host cities of the men's football tournament of the 2016 Summer Olympics.		
Capacity: 51,900	Location of the host cities of the men's football tournament of the 2016 Summer Olympics.		
Manaus	Location of the host cities of the men's football tournament of the 2016 Summer Olympics.		
Arena da Amazônia	Location of the host cities of the men's football tournament of the 2016 Summer Olympics.		
Capacity: 40,549	Location of the host cities of the men's football tournament of the 2016 Summer Olympics.		

=== Training venues ===
Event stadium	Training venue #1	Training venue #2	Training venue #3	Training venue #4
Estádio do Maracanã	CFZ Stadium	Vasco Barra Football Club	Juliano Moreira Sports Complex	—N/a
Estádio Nacional Mané Garrincha	Cave Stadium	Minas Brasília Tennis Club	Yacht Club of Brasília	Cruzeiro Stadium
Estádio Mineirão	Toca da Raposa 1	Toca da Raposa 2	Cidade do Galo	América F.C. Training Center
Itaipava Arena Fonte Nova	Parque Santiago Stadium	Pituaçu Stadium	Barradão Stadium	E.C. Bahia Training Center
Arena Corinthians	São Paulo F.C. Training Center	S.E. Palmeiras Training Center	C.A. Juventus Stadium	Nacional A.C. Stadium

== Squads ==
The men's tournament was an under-23 international tournament (born on or after 1 January 1993), with a maximum of three overage players allowed. Each team had to submit a squad of 18 players, two of whom had to be goalkeepers. Each team might also have a list of four alternate players, who might replace any player in the squad in case of injury during the tournament.

== Draw ==
The draw for the tournament was held on 14 April 2016, 10:30 BRT (UTC−3), at the Maracanã Stadium in Rio de Janeiro. The 16 teams in the men's tournament were drawn into four groups of four teams. The teams were seeded into four pots based on their performances in the five previous Olympics (with more recent tournaments weighted higher), plus bonus points awarded to the six confederation qualifying champions (Japan, Nigeria, Mexico, Argentina, Fiji, Sweden). The hosts Brazil were automatically assigned into position A1. No groups could contain more than one team from the same confederation.

Pot 1	Pot 2	Pot 3	Pot 4
Brazil; Japan; Mexico; Argentina	Nigeria; South Korea; Honduras; Iraq	Sweden; Fiji; Portugal; South Africa	Algeria; Colombia; Denmark; Germany

== Group stage ==
The top two teams of each group advanced to the quarter-finals. The rankings of teams in each group were determined as follows:

1. Points obtained in all group matches;
2. Goal difference in all group matches;
3. Number of goals scored in all group matches;

If two or more teams were equal on the basis of the above three criteria, their rankings were determined as follows:

4. Points obtained in the group matches between the teams concerned;
5. Goal difference in the group matches between the teams concerned;
6. Number of goals scored in the group matches between the teams concerned;
7. Drawing of lots by the FIFA Organising Committee.

=== Group A ===
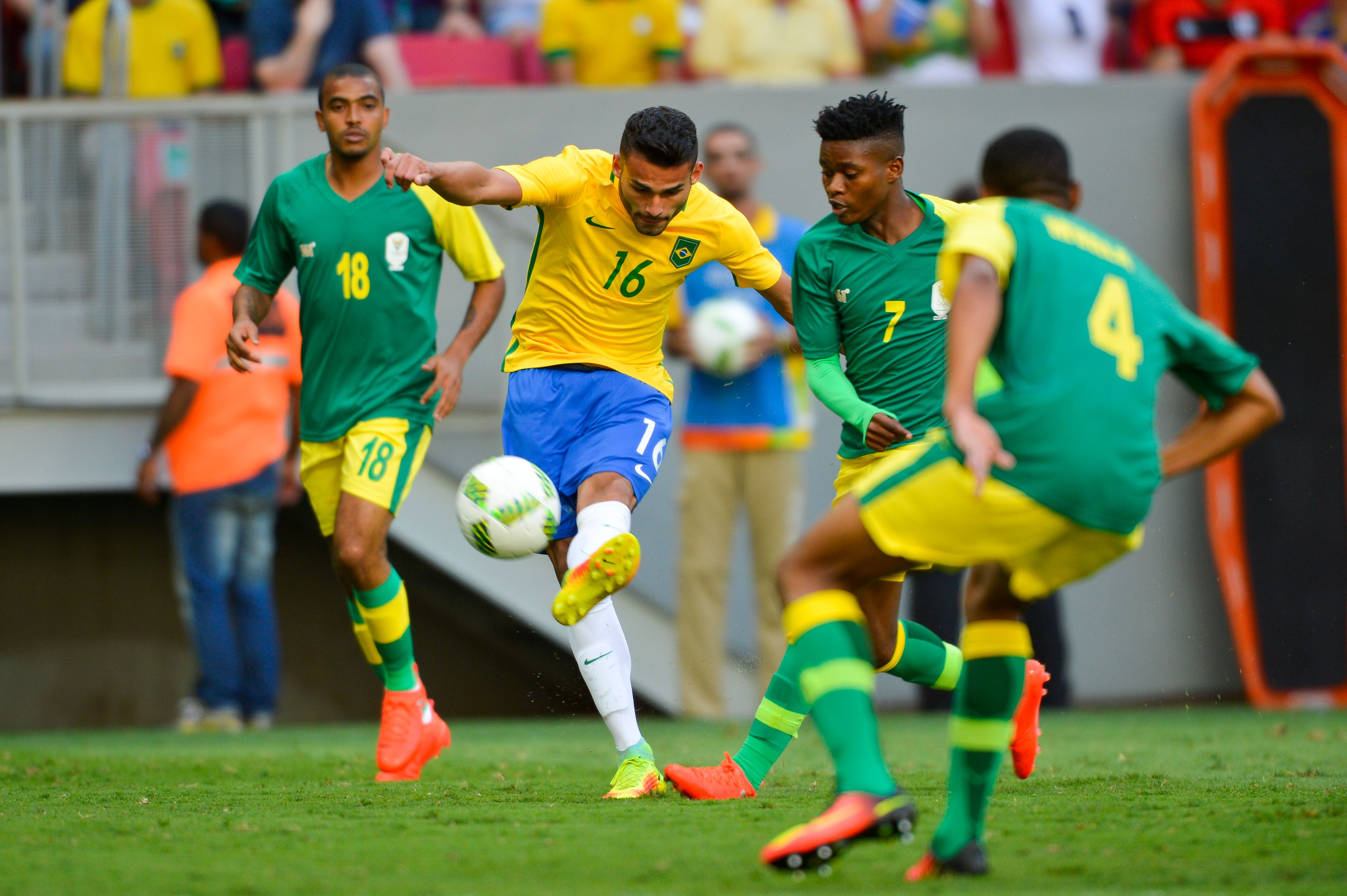
Brazil vs South Africa

Pos	Team	Pld	W	D	L	GF	GA	GD	Pts	Qualification
1	Brazil (H)	3	1	2	0	4	0	+4	5	Quarter-finals
2	Denmark	3	1	1	1	1	4	−3	4	Quarter-finals
3	Iraq	3	0	3	0	1	1	0	3	
4	South Africa	3	0	2	1	1	2	−1	2	

Source: Rio2016 & FIFA
Rules for classification: Tiebreakers
(H) Hosts
4 August 2016
13:00

Iraq	0–0	Denmark
	Report (Rio2016); Report (FIFA)

Estádio Nacional Mané Garrincha, Brasília
Attendance: 18,000
Referee: César Ramos (Mexico)
4 August 2016
16:00

Brazil	0–0	South Africa
	Report (Rio2016); Report (FIFA)

Estádio Nacional Mané Garrincha, Brasília
Attendance: 69,389
Referee: Antonio Mateu Lahoz (Spain)

7 August 2016
19:00

Denmark	1–0	South Africa
Skov 69'	Report (Rio2016); Report (FIFA)

Estádio Nacional Mané Garrincha, Brasília
Attendance: 32,314
Referee: Ryuji Sato (Japan)
7 August 2016
22:00

Brazil	0–0	Iraq
	Report (Rio2016); Report (FIFA)

Estádio Nacional Mané Garrincha, Brasília
Attendance: 65,829
Referee: Ovidiu Hațegan (Romania)

10 August 2016
22:00

Denmark	0–4	Brazil
	Report (Rio2016); Report (FIFA)	Gabriel 26', 80'; Jesus 40'; Luan Vieira 50'

Itaipava Arena Fonte Nova, Salvador
Attendance: 41,067
Referee: Alireza Faghani (Iran)
10 August 2016
22:00

South Africa	1–1	Iraq
Motupa 6'	Report (Rio2016); Report (FIFA)	Abdul-Amir 14'

Arena Corinthians, São Paulo
Attendance: 37,742
Referee: Roddy Zambrano (Ecuador)

=== Group B ===
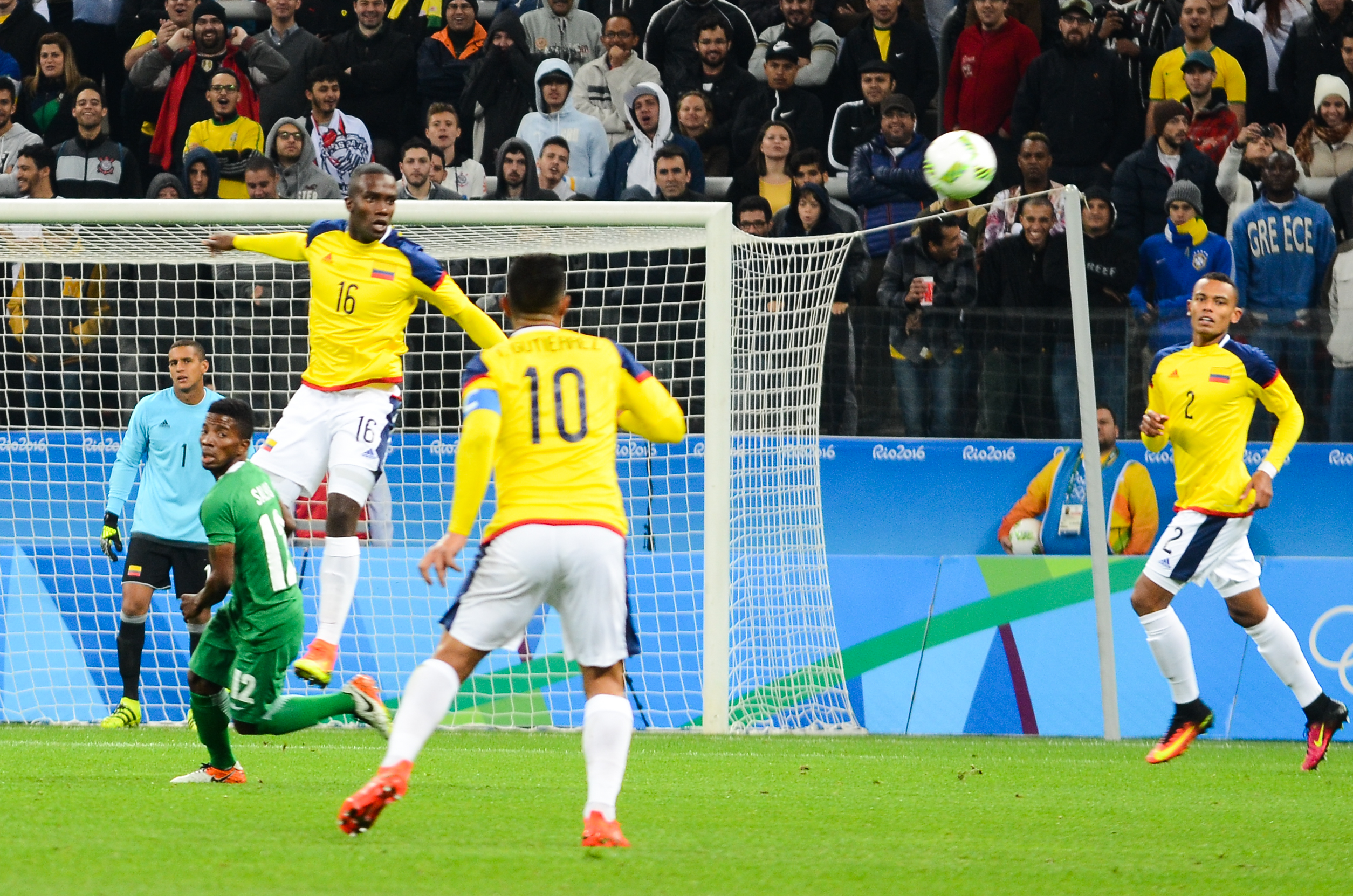
Nigeria vs Colombia

Pos	Team	Pld	W	D	L	GF	GA	GD	Pts	Qualification
1	Nigeria	3	2	0	1	6	6	0	6	Quarter-finals
2	Colombia	3	1	2	0	6	4	+2	5	Quarter-finals
3	Japan	3	1	1	1	7	7	0	4	
4	Sweden	3	0	1	2	2	4	−2	1	

Source: Rio2016 & FIFA
Rules for classification: Tiebreakers
4 August 2016
19:00 (18:00 UTC–4)

Sweden	2–2	Colombia
Ishak 43'; Ajdarević 62'	Report (Rio2016); Report (FIFA)	Gutiérrez 17'; Pabón 75' (pen.)

Arena da Amazônia, Manaus
Attendance: 29,996
Referee: Fahad Al-Mirdasi (Saudi Arabia)
4 August 2016
22:00 (21:00 UTC–4)

Nigeria	5–4	Japan
Sadiq 6'; Etebo 10', 42', 52' (pen.), 66'	Report (Rio2016); Report (FIFA)	Koroki 9' (pen.); Minamino 12'; Asano 70'; Suzuki 90+5'

Arena da Amazônia, Manaus
Attendance: 29,996
Referee: Clément Turpin (France)

7 August 2016
19:00 (18:00 UTC–4)

Sweden	0–1	Nigeria
	Report (Rio2016); Report (FIFA)	Sadiq 40'

Arena da Amazônia, Manaus
Attendance: 23,892
Referee: Matthew Conger (New Zealand)
7 August 2016
22:00 (21:00 UTC–4)

Japan	2–2	Colombia
Asano 67'; Nakajima 74'	Report (Rio2016); Report (FIFA)	Gutiérrez 59'; Fujiharu 65' (o.g.)

Arena da Amazônia, Manaus
Attendance: 26,603
Referee: Sergei Karasev (Russia)

10 August 2016
19:00

Japan	1–0	Sweden
Yajima 65'	Report (Rio2016); Report (FIFA)

Itaipava Arena Fonte Nova, Salvador
Attendance: 17,821
Referee: Malang Diedhiou (Senegal)
10 August 2016
19:00

Colombia	2–0	Nigeria
Gutiérrez 4'; Pabón 63' (pen.)	Report (Rio2016); Report (FIFA)

Arena Corinthians, São Paulo
Attendance: 36,702
Referee: César Ramos (Mexico)

=== Group C ===
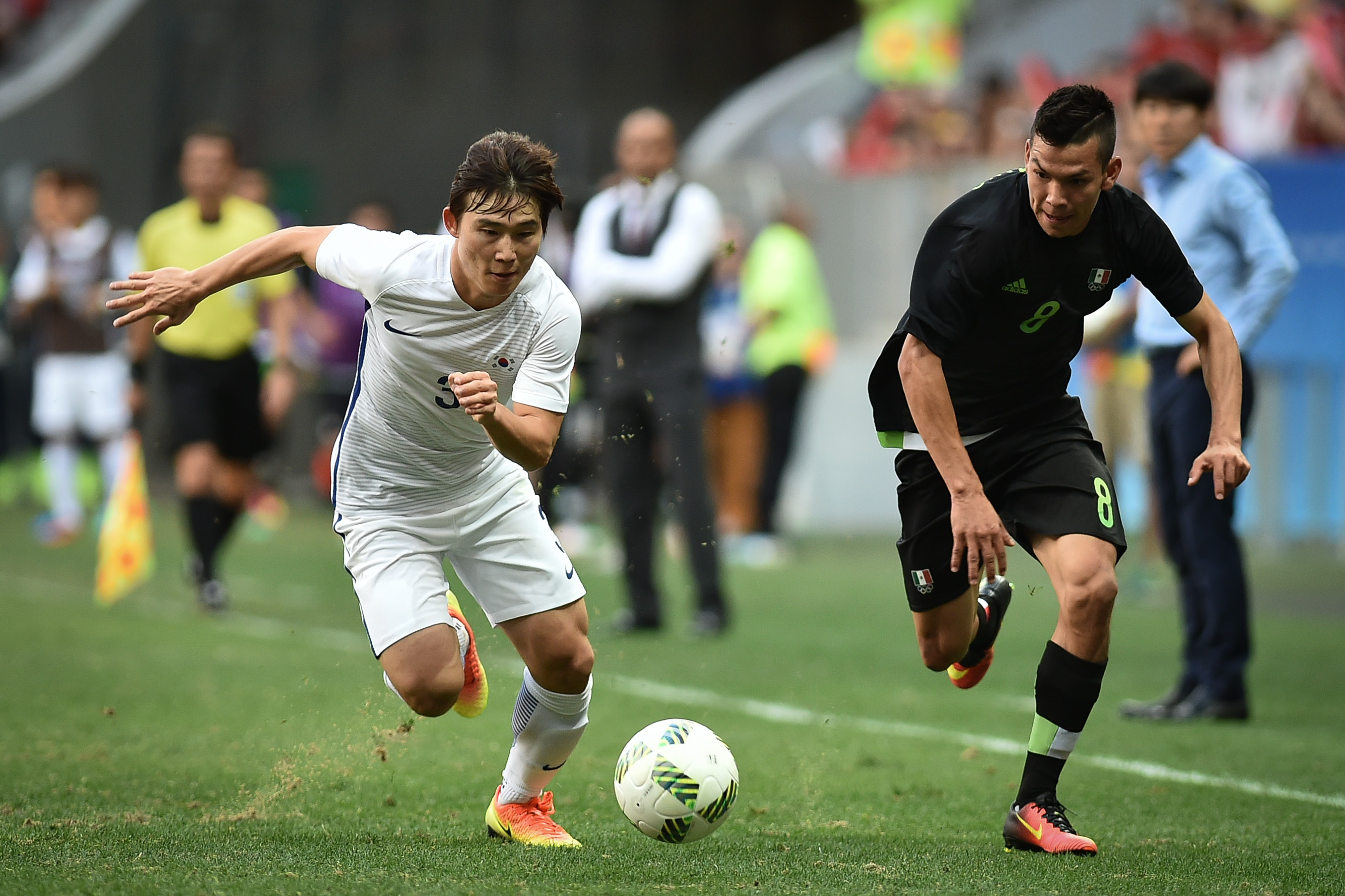
South Korea vs Mexico

Pos	Team	Pld	W	D	L	GF	GA	GD	Pts	Qualification
1	South Korea	3	2	1	0	12	3	+9	7	Quarter-finals
2	Germany	3	1	2	0	15	5	+10	5	Quarter-finals
3	Mexico	3	1	1	1	7	4	+3	4	
4	Fiji	3	0	0	3	1	23	−22	0	

Source: Rio2016 & FIFA
Rules for classification: Tiebreakers
4 August 2016
17:00

Mexico	2–2	Germany
Peralta 52'; Pizarro 60'	Report (Rio2016); Report (FIFA)	Gnabry 58'; Ginter 78'

Itaipava Arena Fonte Nova, Salvador
Attendance: 16,500
Referee: Alireza Faghani (Iran)
4 August 2016
20:00

Fiji	0–8	South Korea
	Report (Rio2016); Report (FIFA)	Ryu Seung-woo 32', 63', 90+3'; Kwon Chang-hoon 62', 63'; Son Heung-min 72' (pen.); Suk Hyun-jun 77', 90'

Itaipava Arena Fonte Nova, Salvador
Attendance: 16,000
Referee: Malang Diedhiou (Senegal)

7 August 2016
13:00

Fiji	1–5	Mexico
Krishna 10'	Report (Rio2016); Report (FIFA)	Gutiérrez 48', 55', 58', 73'; Salcedo 67'

Itaipava Arena Fonte Nova, Salvador
Attendance: 11,200
Referee: Gehad Grisha (Egypt)
7 August 2016
16:00

Germany	3–3	South Korea
Gnabry 33', 90+2'; Selke 55'	Report (Rio2016); Report (FIFA)	Hwang Hee-chan 25'; Son Heung-min 57'; Suk Hyun-jun 87'

Itaipava Arena Fonte Nova, Salvador
Attendance: 17,121
Referee: Néstor Pitana (Argentina)

10 August 2016
16:00

Germany	10–0	Fiji
Gnabry 8', 45'; Petersen 14', 33', 40', 63' (pen.), 70'; Meyer 30', 49', 52'	Report (Rio2016); Report (FIFA)

Mineirão, Belo Horizonte
Attendance: 16,521
Referee: Fahad Al-Mirdasi (Saudi Arabia)
10 August 2016
16:00

South Korea	1–0	Mexico
Kwon Chang-hoon 73'	Report (Rio2016); Report (FIFA)

Estádio Nacional Mané Garrincha, Brasília
Attendance: 19,332
Referee: Clément Turpin (France)

=== Group D ===
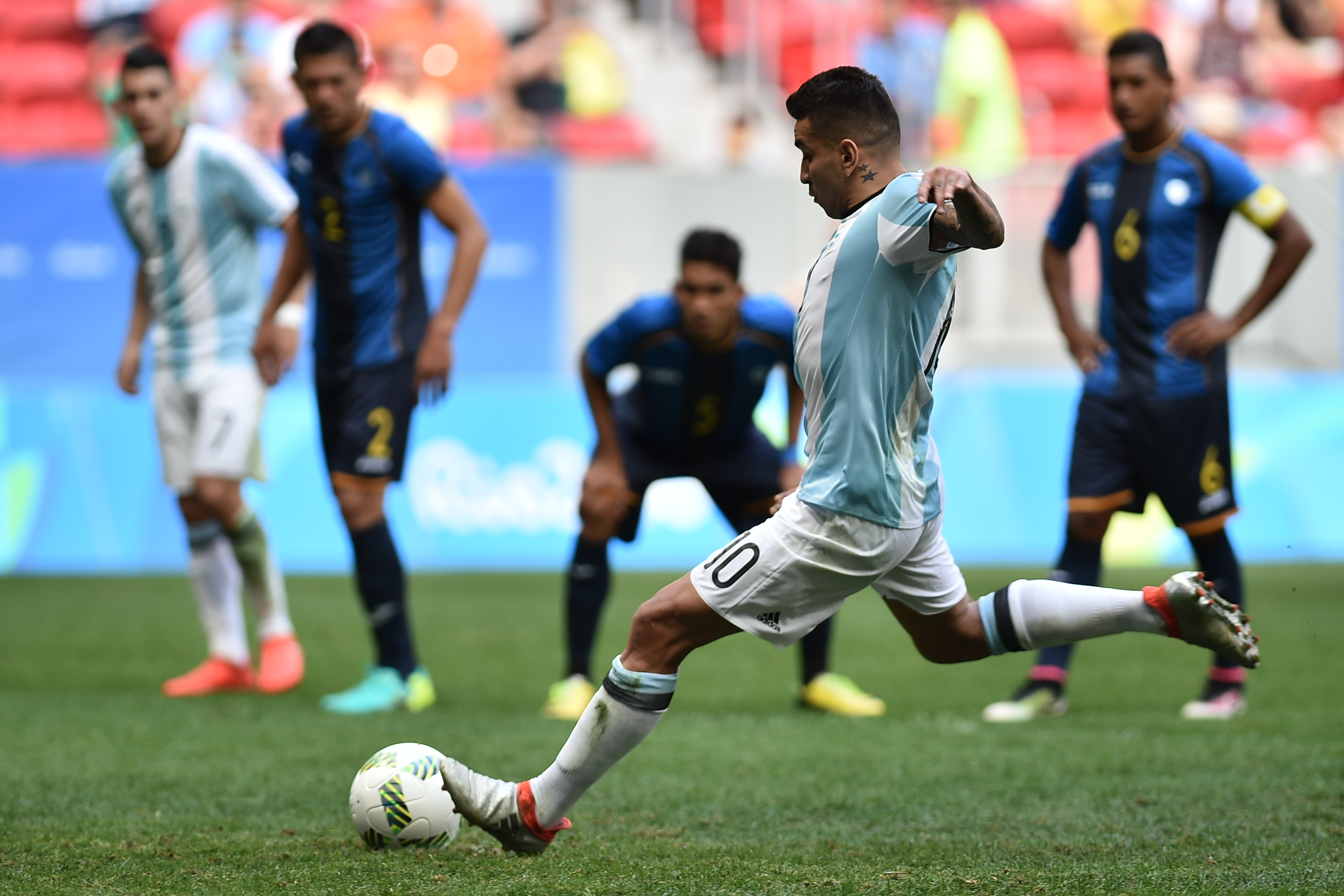
Argentina vs Honduras

Pos	Team	Pld	W	D	L	GF	GA	GD	Pts	Qualification
1	Portugal	3	2	1	0	5	2	+3	7	Quarter-finals
2	Honduras	3	1	1	1	5	5	0	4	Quarter-finals
3	Argentina	3	1	1	1	3	4	−1	4	
4	Algeria	3	0	1	2	4	6	−2	1	

Source: Rio2016 & FIFA
Rules for classification: Tiebreakers
4 August 2016
15:00

Honduras	3–2	Algeria
Quioto 13'; Pereira 33'; Lozano 79'	Report (Rio2016); Report (FIFA)	Bendebka 68'; Bounedjah 85'

Estádio Olímpico João Havelange, Rio de Janeiro
Attendance: 20,000
Referee: Sandro Ricci (Brazil)
4 August 2016
18:00

Portugal	2–0	Argentina
Paciência 66'; Pité 84'	Report (Rio2016); Report (FIFA)

Estádio Olímpico João Havelange, Rio de Janeiro
Attendance: 37,407
Referee: Walter López Castellanos (Guatemala)

7 August 2016
15:00

Honduras	1–2	Portugal
Elis 1'	Report (Rio2016); Report (FIFA)	Figueiredo 21'; Paciência 36'

Estádio Olímpico João Havelange, Rio de Janeiro
Attendance: 32,928
Referee: Roddy Zambrano (Ecuador)
7 August 2016
18:00

Argentina	2–1	Algeria
Correa 47'; Calleri 70'	Report (Rio2016); Report (FIFA)	Bendebka 64'

Estádio Olímpico João Havelange, Rio de Janeiro
Attendance: 37,450
Referee: Cüneyt Çakır (Turkey)

10 August 2016
13:00

Argentina	1–1	Honduras
Martínez 90+3'	Report (Rio2016); Report (FIFA)	Lozano 75' (pen.)

Estádio Nacional Mané Garrincha, Brasília
Attendance: 16,029
Referee: Antonio Mateu Lahoz (Spain)
10 August 2016
13:00

Algeria	1–1	Portugal
Benkablia 30'	Report (Rio2016); Report (FIFA)	Paciência 25' (pen.)

Mineirão, Belo Horizonte
Attendance: 13,787
Referee: Matthew Conger (New Zealand)

== Knockout stage ==
In the knockout stage, if a match was level at the end of normal playing time, extra time was played (two periods of fifteen minutes each) and followed, if necessary, by a penalty shoot-out to determine the winner.

On 18 March 2016, the FIFA Executive Committee agreed that the competition would be part of the International Football Association Board's trial to allow a fourth substitute to be made during extra time.

Quarter-finals
13 August – São Paulo
Brazil	2
Colombia	0
13 August – Belo Horizonte
South Korea	0
Honduras	1
13 August – Salvador
Nigeria	2
Denmark	0
13 August – Brasília
Portugal	0
Germany	4

Semi-finals
17 August – Rio de Janeiro (Maracanã)
Brazil	6
Honduras	0
17 August – São Paulo
Nigeria	0
Germany	2

Gold medal match
20 August – Rio de Janeiro (Maracanã)
Brazil (p)	1 (5)
Germany	1 (4)
Bronze medal match
20 August – Belo Horizonte
Honduras	2
Nigeria	3

=== Quarter-finals ===
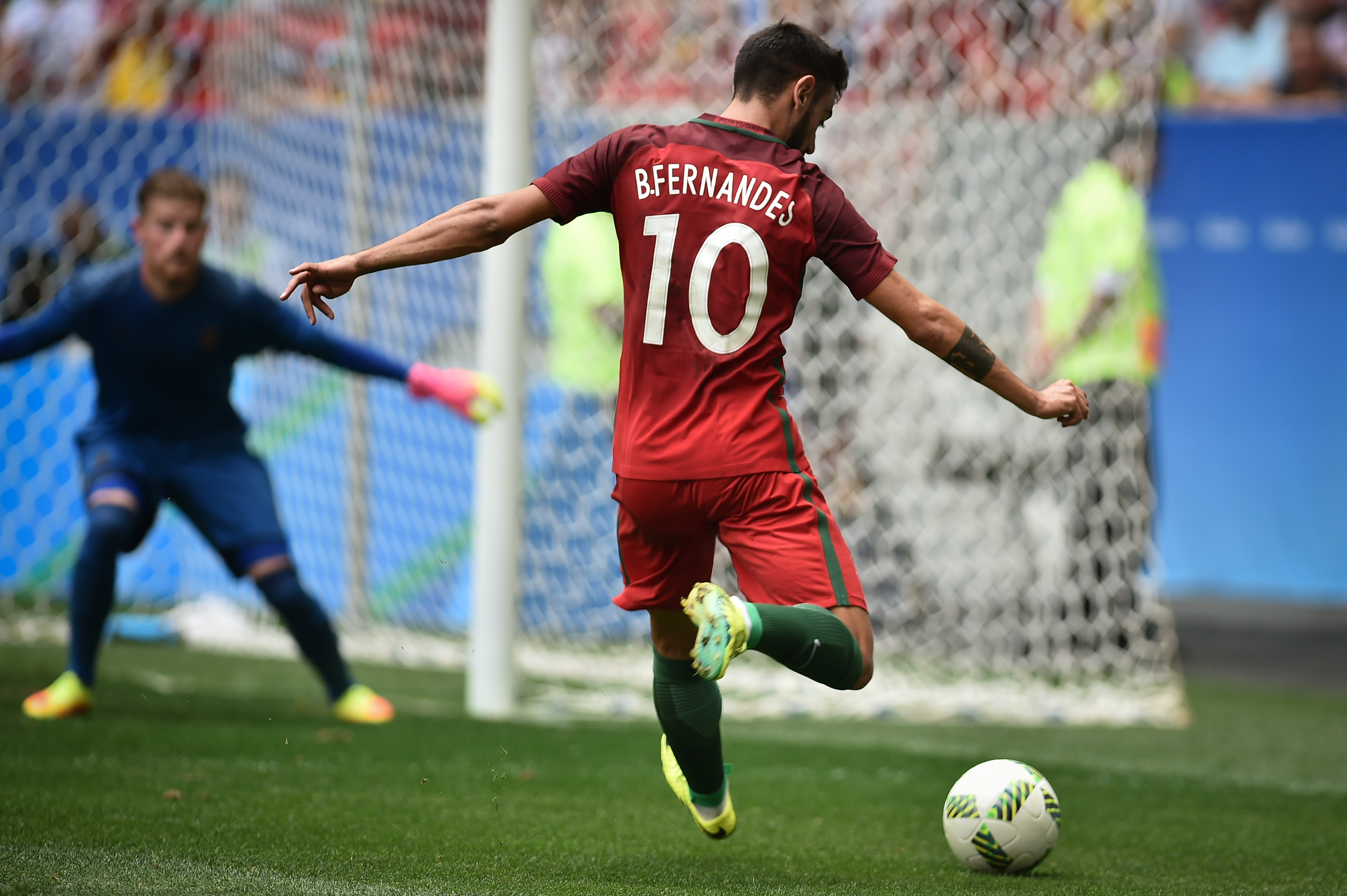
Portugal vs Germany

13 August 2016
13:00

Portugal	0–4	Germany
	Report (Rio2016); Report (FIFA)	Gnabry 45+1'; Ginter 57'; Selke 75'; Max 87'

Estádio Nacional Mané Garrincha, Brasília
Attendance: 55,412
Referee: Walter López Castellanos (Guatemala)

13 August 2016
16:00

Nigeria	2–0	Denmark
Mikel 15'; Umar 59'	Report (Rio2016); Report (FIFA)

Itaipava Arena Fonte Nova, Salvador
Attendance: 30,307
Referee: Sandro Ricci (Brazil)

13 August 2016
19:00

South Korea	0–1	Honduras
	Report (Rio2016); Report (FIFA)	Elis 59'

Mineirão, Belo Horizonte
Attendance: 36,704
Referee: Gehad Grisha (Egypt)

13 August 2016
22:00

Brazil	2–0	Colombia
Neymar 12'; Luan Vieira 83'	Report (Rio2016); Report (FIFA)

Arena Corinthians, São Paulo
Attendance: 41,560
Referee: Cüneyt Çakır (Turkey)

=== Semi-finals ===
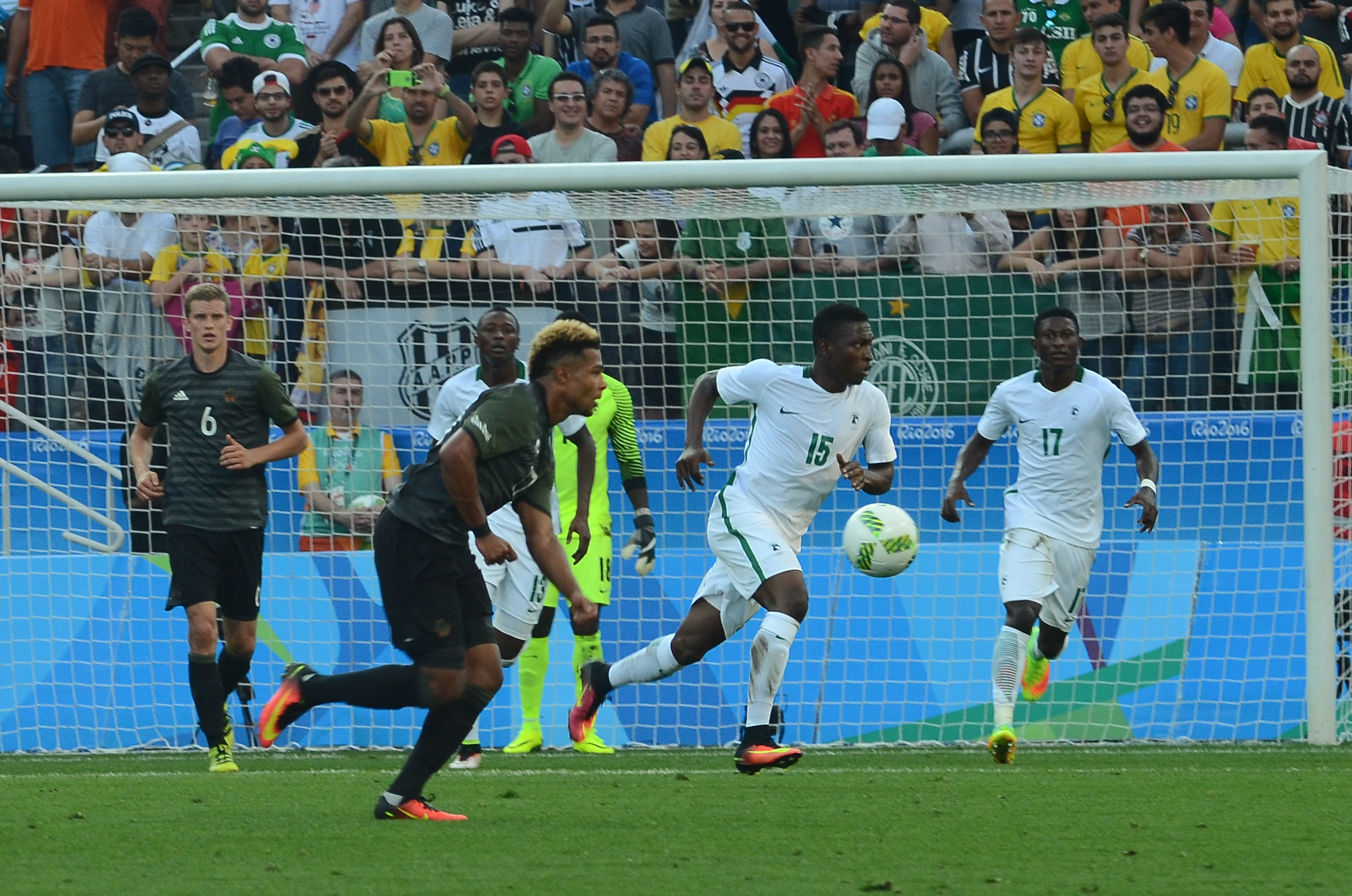
Nigeria vs Germany

17 August 2016
13:00

Brazil	6–0	Honduras
Neymar 1', 90+1' (pen.); Gabriel Jesus 26', 35'; Marquinhos 51'; Luan Vieira 79'	Report (Rio2016); Report (FIFA)

Maracanã Stadium, Rio de Janeiro
Attendance: 52,457
Referee: Ovidiu Hațegan (Romania)

17 August 2016
16:00

Nigeria	0–2	Germany
	Report (Rio2016); Report (FIFA)	Klostermann 9'; Petersen 89'

Arena Corinthians, São Paulo
Attendance: 35,562
Referee: Néstor Pitana (Argentina)

=== Bronze medal match ===
20 August 2016
13:00

Honduras	2–3	Nigeria
Lozano 71'; Pereira 86'	Report (Rio2016); Report (FIFA)	Sadiq 34', 56'; Umar 49'

Mineirão, Belo Horizonte
Attendance: 9,091
Referee: Sandro Ricci (Brazil)

=== Gold medal match ===
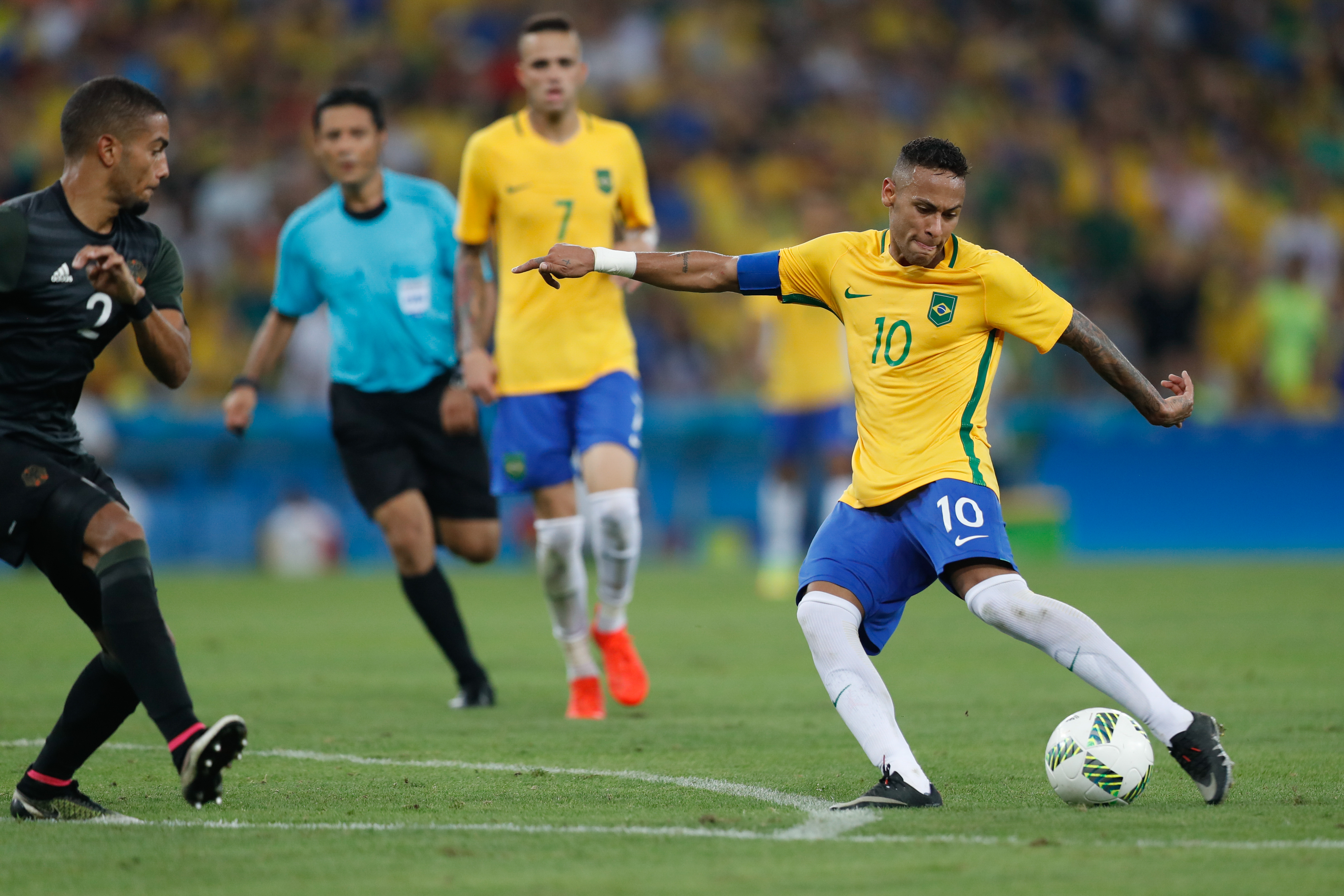
Brazil vs Germany

20 August 2016
17:30

Brazil	1–1 (a.e.t.)	Germany
Neymar 27'	Report (Rio2016); Report (ESPN)	Meyer 59'
Penalties
Renato Augusto (penalty scored); Marquinhos (penalty scored); Rafinha (penalty scored); Luan Vieira (penalty scored); Neymar (penalty scored)	5–4	(penalty scored) Ginter; (penalty scored) Gnabry; (penalty scored) Brandt; (penalty scored) Süle; (penalty missed) Petersen

Maracanã Stadium, Rio de Janeiro
Attendance: 63,707
Referee: Alireza Faghani (Iran)

== Goalscorers ==
6 goals

- (Germany) Serge Gnabry
- (Germany) Nils Petersen

4 goals

- (Brazil) Neymar
- (Germany) Max Meyer
- (Mexico) Erick Gutiérrez
- (Nigeria) Peter Etebo
- (Nigeria) Umar Sadiq

3 goals

- (Brazil) Gabriel Jesus
- (Brazil) Luan Vieira
- (Colombia) Teo Gutiérrez
- (Honduras) Anthony Lozano
- (South Korea) Kwon Chang-hoon
- (South Korea) Ryu Seung-woo
- (South Korea) Suk Hyun-jun
- (Portugal) Gonçalo Paciência

2 goals

- (Algeria) Sofiane Bendebka
- (Brazil) Gabriel Barbosa
- (Colombia) Dorlan Pabón
- (Germany) Matthias Ginter
- (Germany) Davie Selke
- (Honduras) Alberth Elis
- (Honduras) Marcelo Pereira
- (Japan) Takuma Asano
- (Nigeria) Aminu Umar
- (South Korea) Son Heung-min

1 goal

- (Algeria) Mohamed Benkablia
- (Algeria) Baghdad Bounedjah
- (Argentina) Jonathan Calleri
- (Argentina) Ángel Correa
- (Argentina) Mauricio Martínez
- (Brazil) Marquinhos
- (Denmark) Robert Skov
- (Fiji) Roy Krishna
- (Germany) Lukas Klostermann
- (Germany) Philipp Max
- (Honduras) Romell Quioto
- (Iraq) Saad Abdul-Amir
- (Japan) Shinzo Koroki
- (Japan) Takumi Minamino
- (Japan) Shoya Nakajima
- (Japan) Musashi Suzuki
- (Japan) Shinya Yajima
- (Mexico) Oribe Peralta
- (Mexico) Rodolfo Pizarro
- (Mexico) Carlos Salcedo
- (Nigeria) Mikel John Obi
- (Portugal) Tobias Figueiredo
- (Portugal) Pité
- (South Korea) Hwang Hee-chan
- (South Africa) Gift Motupa
- (Sweden) Astrit Ajdarević
- (Sweden) Mikael Ishak

Own goals

- (Japan) Hiroki Fujiharu (playing against Colombia)

== Final ranking ==
As per statistical convention in football, matches decided in extra time are counted as wins and losses, while matches decided by penalty shoot-outs are counted as draws.

Pos	Team	Pld	W	D	L	GF	GA	GD	Pts	Final result
1st place, gold medalist(s)	Brazil (H)	6	3	3	0	13	1	+12	12	Gold Medal
2nd place, silver medalist(s)	Germany	6	3	3	0	22	6	+16	12	Silver Medal
3rd place, bronze medalist(s)	Nigeria	6	4	0	2	11	10	+1	12	Bronze Medal
4	Honduras	6	2	1	3	8	14	−6	7	Fourth place
5	South Korea	4	2	1	1	12	4	+8	7	Eliminated in quarter-finals
6	Portugal	4	2	1	1	5	6	−1	7	Eliminated in quarter-finals
7	Colombia	4	1	2	1	6	6	0	5	Eliminated in quarter-finals
8	Denmark	4	1	1	2	1	6	−5	4	Eliminated in quarter-finals
9	Mexico	3	1	1	1	7	4	+3	4	Eliminated in group stage
10	Japan	3	1	1	1	7	7	0	4	Eliminated in group stage
11	Argentina	3	1	1	1	3	4	−1	4	Eliminated in group stage
12	Iraq	3	0	3	0	1	1	0	3	Eliminated in group stage
13	South Africa	3	0	2	1	1	2	−1	2	Eliminated in group stage
14	Algeria	3	0	1	2	4	6	−2	1	Eliminated in group stage
15	Sweden	3	0	1	2	2	4	−2	1	Eliminated in group stage
16	Fiji	3	0	0	3	1	23	−22	0	Eliminated in group stage

Source: Rio2016
(H) Hosts

== See also ==
- Football at the 2016 Summer Olympics – Women's tournament
