= Atlético Futebol Clube =

Brazilian former association football club

Atlético
- Full name: Atlético Futebol Clube
- Founded: 7 May 1912
- Dissolved: 1912

The Atlético Futebol Clube or Atlético de Salvador was a Brazilian football club, based in the city of Salvador, capital of the state of Bahia.

Founded on May 7, 1912, it originated from Sport Club Santos Dumont, founded in 1904. After winning the 1912 title against Vitória, Atlético no longer competed in the championship, due to the creation of a new league the following year.

== Honors ==
- Campeonato Baiano: 1912

== See also ==
- Campeonato Baiano
- Sport Club Santos Dumont
