= Anderson Pato =

Brazilian footballer

Personal information
- Full name: Anderson Bispo dos Santos
- Date of birth: 28 September 2002 (age 24)
- Place of birth: Salvador, Brazil
- Height: 1.78 m (5 ft 10 in)
- Position: Forward

Team information
- Current team: Vitória
- Number: 28

Senior career*
Years	Team	Apps	(Gls)
2024	Galícia	9	(0)
2026	Juazeirense	10	(2)
2026–	Vitória	1	(0)
- * Club domestic league appearances and goals as of 23:08, 16 March 2026 (UTC)

Anderson Bispo dos Santos (born 28 September 2002), known as Anderson Pato, is a Brazilian footballer who plays as a forward for Vitória.

== Career ==
Born in Fazenda Coutos, a neighborhood in Salvador, Bahia, Anderson Pato played amateur football during the most of his teens, and had a brief opportunity to play professional football in 2024, when he represented Galícia in the Campeonato Baiano Second Division. On 28 December 2025, after impressing with the amateur side of Simões Filho, he was announced at Juazeirense.

On 5 March 2026, after impressing in the 2026 Campeonato Baiano, Anderson Pato moved to Série A side Vitória on a two-year contract. He made his debut for the club nine days later, coming on as a second-half substitute for Matheuzinho in a 2–0 home win over Atlético Mineiro.

== Career statistics ==
As of 16 March 2026

Club	Season	League			State league		Cup		Continental		Other		Total	
Club	Season	Division	Apps	Goals	Apps	Goals	Apps	Goals	Apps	Goals	Apps	Goals	Apps	Goals
Galícia	2024	Baiano 2ª Divisão	—		9	0	—		—		—		9	0
Juazeirense	2026	Série D	0	0	10	2	1	0	—		—		11	2
Vitória	2026	Série A	1	0	—		0	0	—		0	0	1	0
Career total			1	0	19	2	1	0	0	0	0	0	21	2
