= Vila Olímpica =

Association football training ground in Belo Horizonte, Brazil

- Interactive map of Vila Olímpica
- Location: Belo Horizonte, Minas Gerais, Brazil
- Coordinates: 19°49′42″S 43°57′13″W
- Owner: Atlético Mineiro
- Type: Sports facility

Construction
- Opened: 1973

Vila Olímpica (Olympic Village) is Atlético Mineiro's former training ground, located in Belo Horizonte, Brazil. Inaugurated in 1973, it served as the club's main training facility for almost three decades, before Cidade do Galo was built. It also hosted the Brazil national football team in its preparation for the 1982 FIFA World Cup. The facility is currently a leisure club for Atlético Mineiro's associates.

== History ==
Originally planned to be built on the site of the old Antônio Carlos stadium, in downtown Belo Horizonte, a legal dispute between Atlético Mineiro and the Belo Horizonte municipal government made the planned new facility to be relocated to the Pampulha region. Vila Olímpica opened in 1973.

The Brazil national football team, then coached by Atlético Mineiro's former manager Telê Santana, trained on the grounds in its preparation for the 1982 FIFA World Cup. During the decades in which it was the club's training ground, Vila Olímpica, which also includes leisure facilities, was shared between the first-team and the associates, with disagreements sometimes happening.

With the improvements made throughout the decades to the new training grounds, which had its construction started in the 1980s, the club's first squad moved to Cidade do Galo in 2001. Since then, Vila Olímpica operates as a leisure club and gym.

== Facilities ==
The complex includes an official size football pitch, medical department, running track, water park, peteca, volleyball, futsal and 7-a-side football courts, saunas, restaurant, gym, children's area and a reception hall with a 400 capacity.
