= Vespasiano =

Municipality in southeast Brazil

- Municipality
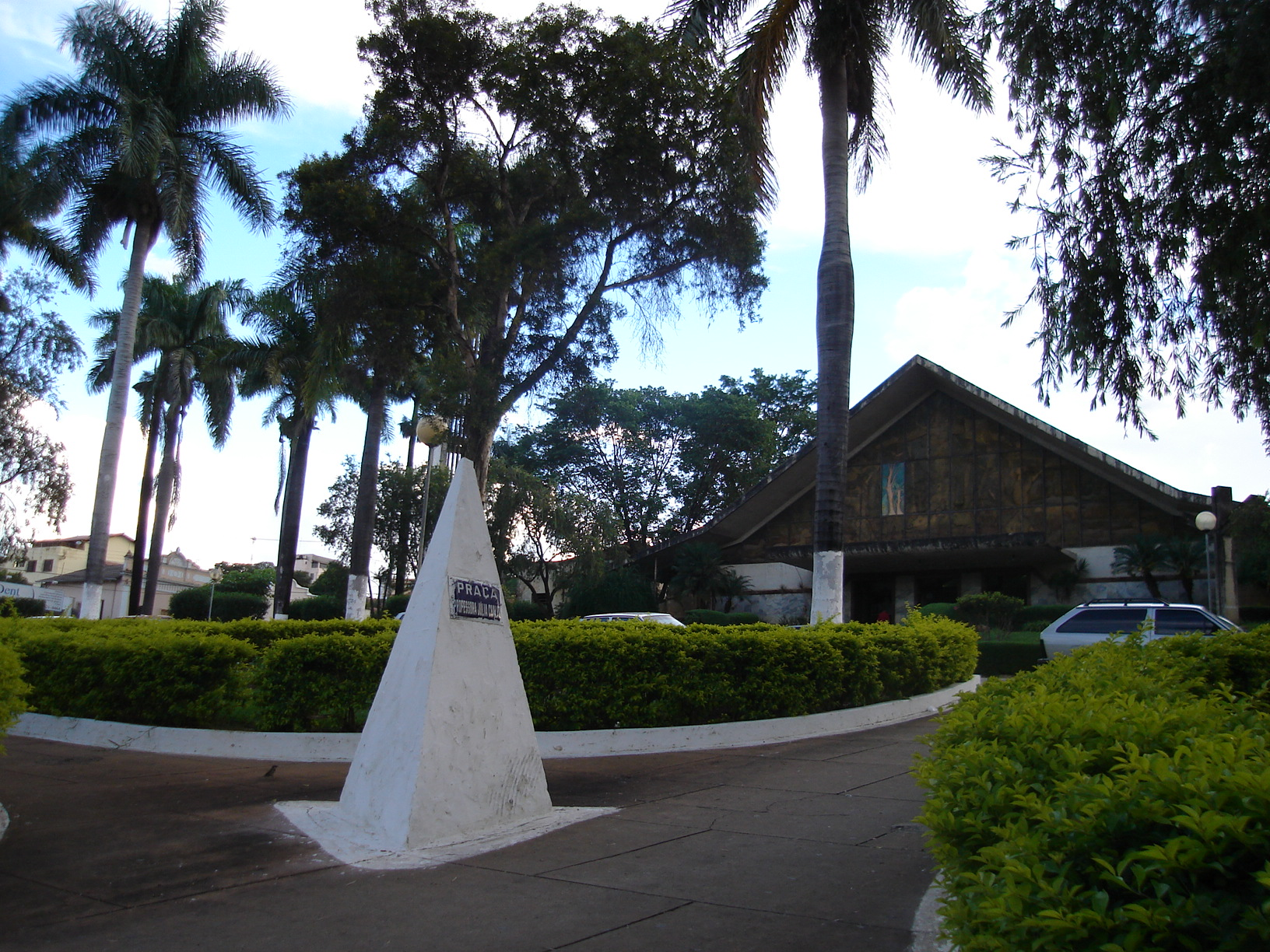
- Central square.

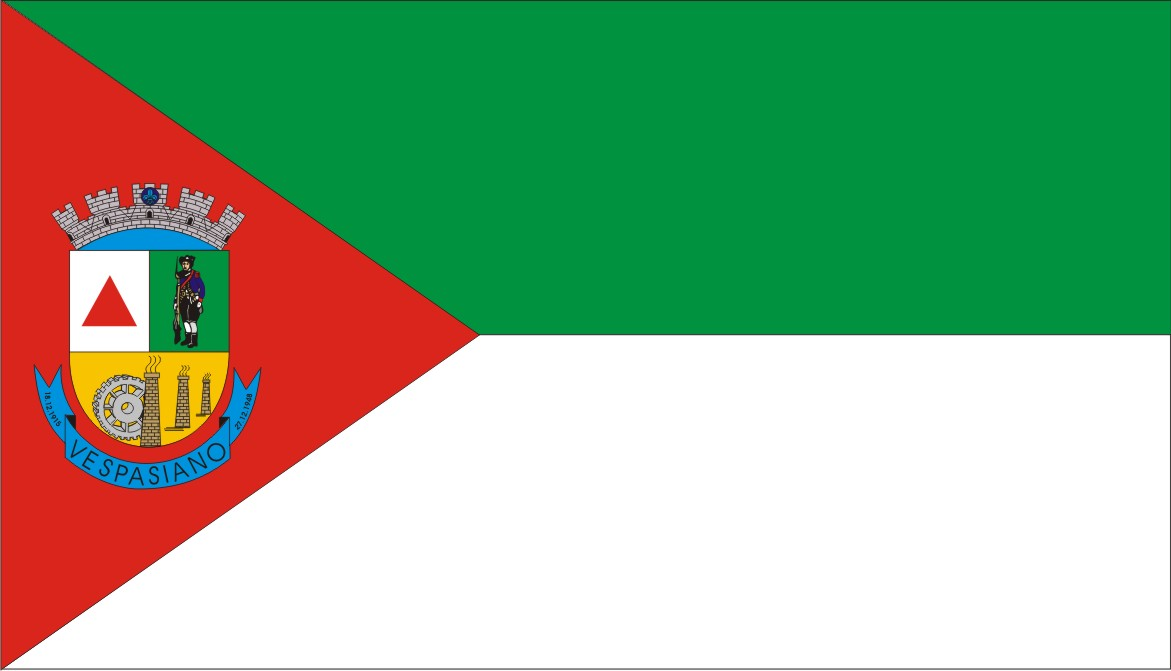
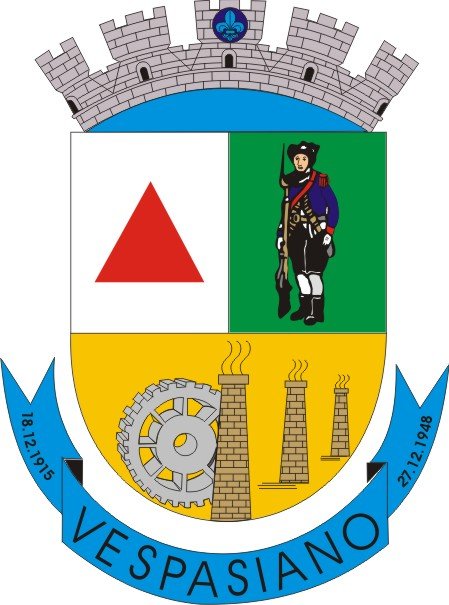
- Flag Coat of arms

- Location of Vespasiano

- Location within Brazil
- Coordinates: 19°41′31″S 43°55′22″W
- Country: Brazil
- Region: Southeast
- State: Minas Gerais
- Founded: 27 December 1948

Government
  - Mayor: Jose Winston Da Silva(PSDB)

Area
  - Total: 70.108 km^{2} (27.069 sq mi)
- Elevation: 693 m (2,274 ft)

Population (2022 Census)
  - Total: 129,246
  - Estimate (2025): 138,583
  - Density: 1,843.5/km^{2} (4,774.7/sq mi)
- Demonym: vespasianense
- Time zone: UTC−3 (BRT)
- Website: www.vespasiano.mg.gov.br

Vespasiano is a municipality in the Belo Horizonte metropolitan region in the Brazilian state of Minas Gerais, located 27 kilometres (17 mi) north of Belo Horizonte.

Vespasiano is home to Cidade do Galo, the training grounds of Campeonato Brasileiro Série A team Atlético Mineiro. FASEH, a higher learning institution, is also located in the city.

== See also ==
- List of municipalities in Minas Gerais
