= Galícia Esporte Clube =

Galícia
- Full name: Galícia Esporte Clube
- Nicknames: Azulino (Blue One); Granadeiro (Grenadier); Demolidor de Campeões (Champions Crusher)
- Founded: January 1, 1933
- Ground: Parque Santiago, Salvador, Bahia Brazil
- Capacity: 8,000
- President: Dario Rego
- League: Campeonato Baiano
- 2025: Baiano Segunda Divisão, 2nd of 10 (promoted)
Home colours	Away colours

Galícia Esporte Clube is a Brazilian football club from Salvador, capital of the state of Bahia, in Brazil's northeast region.

== History ==
Galícia was founded on January 1, 1933 by immigrants from the autonomous region of Galicia, Spain. Its founder and first president was Mr. Eduardo Castro de la Iglesia.

Galícia was the first club to win the Bahia League Championship (Campeonato Baiano) three times in a row, quickly becoming one of the strongest teams in the state. In its first decade, the club won the League in 1937, 1941, 1942 and 1943, being runner-up another five times (1935, 1936, 1938, 1939 and 1940).

However, after this superb beginning, the club only managed to return to the top in 1968, with its fifth and last Bahia League title. Besides, it was runner-up in 1967, 1980, 1982 and 1995.

Galícia’s best regional performance was in 1969, when it was runner-up of the Northeast Zone of the North-Northeast Cup (Copa Norte-Nordeste). The club only played twice in the Brazilian League (Campeonato Brasileiro) First Division: 1981 and 1983.

In 1999, the team was relegated to Bahia League’s Second Division.

In 2001, Galícia occupied 54th place in the Brazilian Football Clubs Ranking of the prestigious "Placar" magazine.

In 2013, Galícia won the Bahia League’s Second Division, returning to the Bahia League Championship after 14 years of absence.

In 2017, the club finished in the last place of Bahia League Championship, being relegated once more to the Bahia League’s Second Division

== Stadiums ==
In its early years, Galícia played in the old "Campo da Graça" stadium. After its demolition, its home matches moved to Salvador's biggest stadium, Fonte Nova, and sometimes to Pituaçu Stadium. Nowadays, the club has its own stadium, the Parque Santiago, with a seating capacity of 8,000 fans.

== Symbols ==
Galícia’s nicknames are "Demolidor de Campeões" ("Champions' Demolisher"), "Azulino" ("The Blue One") and "Granadeiro" ("grenadier").

Galícia's logo is white, with a blue diagonal strip featuring the letters "G", "E" and "C", and a Saint James Cross in the center, remembering its Galician heritage. The players wear blue shirts and white shorts and socks. The club anthem was composed by Francisco Icó da Silva.

== Honours ==
=== State ===
- Campeonato Baiano
  - Winners (5): 1937, 1941, 1942, 1943, 1968
  - Runners-up (12): 1935, 1936, 1938 (I), 1939, 1940, 1944, 1945, 1948, 1967, 1980, 1982, 1995
- Campeonato Baiano Segunda Divisão
  - Winners (3): 1985, 1988, 2013
- Torneio Início da Bahia
  - Winners (9): 1935, 1936, 1939, 1945, 1946, 1950, 1954, 1957, 1960

=== Friendly tournaments ===
- Torneio Quadrangular de Salvador
  - Winners (1): 1948

=== Awards ===
- Fita Azul
  - Winners (1): 1974

Fita Azul do Futebol Brasileiro (Brazilian Football Blue Ribbon) was an award given for the club which succeeds in an excursion out of the country.

=== Women's Football ===
- Campeonato Baiano de Futebol Feminino
  - Winners (1): 1999
