= Sport Club Santos Dumont =

Santos Dumont
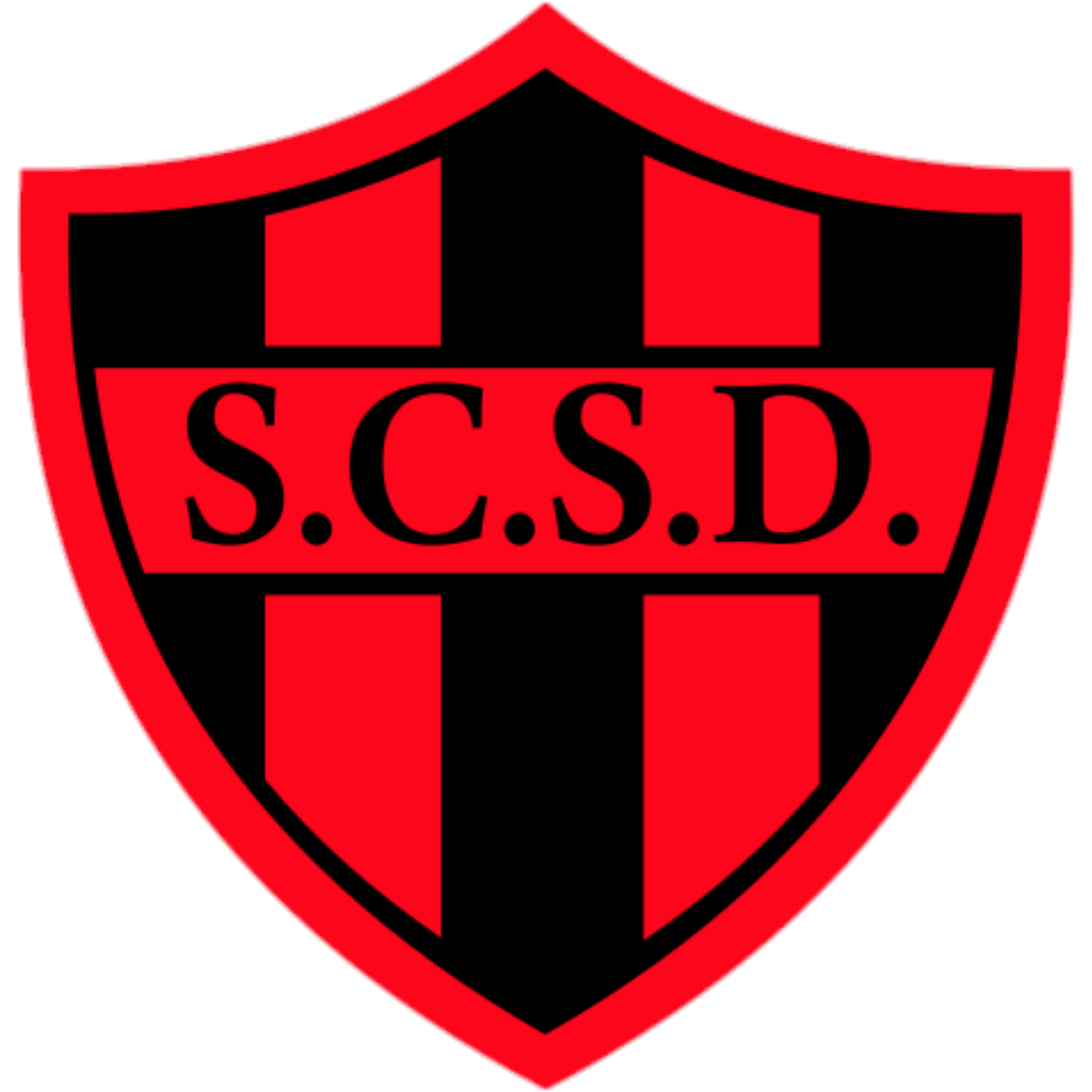
- Full name: Sport Club Santos Dumont
- Founded: May 3, 1904
- Dissolved: 1913
- Ground: Estádio Campo da Pólvora, Salvador, Bahia state, Brazil
- Capacity: 2,000
Home colours	Away colours

Sport Club Santos Dumont, commonly known as Santos Dumont, was a Brazilian football club based in Salvador, Bahia state. They won the Campeonato Baiano once.

== History ==
The club was founded on May 3, 1904, and named after the Brazilian pioneer of aviation, Alberto Santos-Dumont. They won the Campeonato Baiano in 1910. The club folded in 1913.

== Honours ==
- Campeonato Baiano
  - Winners (1): 1910
  - Runners-up (2): 1908, 1909

== Stadium ==
Sport Club Santos Dumont played their home games at Estádio Campo da Pólvora. The stadium had a maximum capacity of 2,000 people.
