= Estádio Parque Santiago =

Soccer stadium in Salvador, Bahia, Brasil

Coordinates: 12°59′00″S 38°28′23″W

Estádio Santiago de Compostela
- Estádio Parque Santiago
- Interactive map of Estádio Santiago de Compostela
- Location: Salvador, Bahia, Brazil
- Owner: Galícia Esporte Clube
- Capacity: 8,000
- Surface: Grass

Construction
- Opened: February 11, 1995

Tenant
- Galícia Esporte Clube

Estádio Santiago de Compostela, commonly known as Estádio Parque Santiago, is a multi-use stadium located in Salvador, Brazil. It is used mostly for football matches and hosts the home matches of Galícia Esporte Clube. The stadium has a maximum capacity of 8,000 people.

The stadium was built with the help of the Spanish community of Salvador.
