= Cidade do Galo =

Sports facility in Vespasiano, Brazil

- Interactive map of Cidade do Galo
- Former names: Centro de Treinamento do Galo (1984–2005)
- Location: Vespasiano, Minas Gerais, Brazil
- Coordinates: 19°44′37″S 43°57′30″W
- Owner: Clube Atlético Mineiro
- Type: Sports facility

Construction
- Groundbreaking: 1982
- Built: 1984–2001
- Opened: 2001
- Expanded: 2006

Cidade do Galo ("Rooster City") is Clube Atlético Mineiro's training ground, located in Vespasiano, a municipality adjacent to Belo Horizonte, Brazil. Construction of the first training pitch started in 1982, but for almost three decades the facility was gradually improved, with Clube Atlético Mineiro's first squad training in the grounds for the first time in 2001, and the official inauguration happening in 2006. Cidade do Galo has been selected as the best training facility in Brazil and one of the best in the world.

== History ==
Acquisition of the land where the ground is located started in 1980, with purchase of an adjacent area and celebration of a partnership with company Precon for the construction of the main buildings happening in 1984. The first training pitch was completed in 1982, but from 1985 to 1998 construction for the then named "Centro de Treinamento do Galo" remained largely stalled.

In 2001, the club's first-squad moved from Vila Olímpica, the club's old training grounds, to the Centro de Treinamento, despite construction being unfinished. From 2001 onwards construction restarted, and in 2005 the youth squads moved to the grounds, with the first-squad hotel being finished in 2006, the same year in which the facility was officially inaugurated by club president Ricardo Annes Guimarães. The name "Cidade do Galo" was unofficially adopted in 2005, being registered in the Instituto Nacional da Propriedade Industrial in 2007.

In 2008, Cidade do Galo hosted the Brazil national football team in preparation for a match against Argentina in Belo Horizonte, and in May 2010, a research conducted by Universidade Federal de Viçosa and SporTV, which evaluated human resources, material resources, physical facilities and logistics, elected Cidade do Galo as the best training facility in Brazil. In 2014, the facility hosted the Argentina national team that finished second place in the 2014 FIFA World Cup, and in the same year Eurosport selected Cidade do Galo as one of the five best football training grounds in the world, the only one outside of Europe.

== Facilities ==
The complex, which has a built area of 5,850 square metres and a total area of 244,460 square metres, includes four official size football pitches, a first-class hotel for first-squad players and youth academy with 20 suites, gaming room, restaurant, auditorium, panoramic deck and industrial kitchen, physiology room, medical and dentistry departments, climatized lockerrooms with hydrotherapy tubs, gym, spa pools, ice tank, 7-a-side football pitch and laundry room. The Press Room has a view to the main training pitch and includes multimedia resources and infrastructure for media professionals.
