= Campeonato Baiano =

Football league in Brazil

- Organising body: FBF
- Founded: 1905; 121 years ago
- Country: Brazil
- State: Bahia
- Number of clubs: 10
- Level on pyramid: 1
- Relegation to: Campeonato Baiano Second Level
- Domestic cup: Copa do Brasil
- Current champions: Bahia (52nd title) (2025)
- Most championships: Bahia (52 titles)
- Website: FBF Official website
- Current: 2026 Campeonato Baiano

The Campeonato Baiano (English: Baiano Championship), also known as the Baianão (English: "Big Bahian" or "Great Bahian"), is the top-flight professional state football league in the Brazilian state of Bahia. Run by the Bahia Football Federation (FBF), it is the second-oldest state football championship of Brazil — just behind the Campeonato Paulista, founded in 1902 — and has been played without interruption since 1905. The biggest winner of the competition is Esporte Clube Bahia, with 51 titles won.

== List of champions ==
Season	Champions	Runners-up
1905	Internacional de Cricket (1)	São Salvador
1906	São Salvador (1)	Vitória
1907	São Salvador (2)	Vitória
1908	Vitória (1)	Santos Dumont
1909	Vitória (2)	Santos Dumont
1910	Santos Dumont (1)	São Paulo Club
1911	SC Bahia (1)	Vitória
1912	Atlético (1)	Vitória
1913	Fluminense (1)	SC Internacional
1914	SC Internacional (1)	Fluminense
1915	Fluminense (2)	Ypiranga
1916	República (1)	Fluminense
1917	Ypiranga (1)	Fluminense
1918	Ypiranga (2)	Botafogo
1919	Botafogo (1)	Fluminense
1920	Ypiranga (3)	Fluminense
1921	Ypiranga (4)	AAB
1922	Botafogo (2)	AAB
1923	Botafogo (3)	AAB
1924	AAB (1)	Bahiano de Tênis
1925	Ypiranga (5)	AAB
1926	Botafogo (4)	Ypiranga
1927	Bahiano de Tênis (1)	Ypiranga
1928	Ypiranga (6)	Bahiano de Tênis
1929	Ypiranga (7)	Botafogo
1930	Botafogo (5)	Fluminense
1931	Bahia (1)	Ypiranga
1932	Ypiranga (8)	Botafogo
1933	Bahia (2)	Ypiranga
1934	Bahia (3)	Energia Circular
1935	Botafogo (6)	Galícia
1936	Bahia (4)	Galícia
1937	Galícia (1)	Ypiranga
1938 (I)	Bahia (5)	Galícia
1938 (II)	Botafogo (7)	Ypiranga
1939	Ypiranga (9)	Galícia
1940	Bahia (6)	Galícia
1941	Galícia (2)	Bahia
1942	Galícia (3)	Vitória
1943	Galícia (4)	Botafogo
1944	Bahia (7)	Galícia
1945	Bahia (8)	Galícia
1946	Guarany (1)	Ypiranga
1947	Bahia (9)	Vitória
1948	Bahia (10)	Galícia
1949	Bahia (11)	Ypiranga
1950	Bahia (12)	Vitória
1951	Ypiranga (10)	Vitória
1952	Bahia (13)	Ypiranga
1953	Vitória (3)	Botafogo
1954	Bahia (14)	Botafogo
1955	Vitória (4)	Bahia
1956	Bahia (15)	Fluminense de Feira
1957	Vitória (5)	Bahia
1958	Bahia (16)	Vitória
1959	Bahia (17)	Vitória
1960	Bahia (18)	Vitória
1961	Bahia (19)	Vitória
1962	Bahia (20)	Vitória
1963	Fluminense de Feira (1)	Bahia
1964	Vitória (6)	Bahia
1965	Vitória (7)	Botafogo
1966	Leônico (1)	Vitória
1967	Bahia (21)	Galícia
1968	Galícia (5)	Fluminense de Feira
1969	Fluminense de Feira (2)	Bahia
1970	Bahia (22)	Itabuna
1971	Bahia (23)	Vitória
1972	Vitória (8)	Bahia
1973	Bahia (24)	Atlético de Alagoinhas
1974	Bahia (25)	Vitória
1975	Bahia (26)	Vitória
1976	Bahia (27)	Vitória
1977	Bahia (28)	Vitória
1978	Bahia (29)	Leônico
1979	Bahia (30)	Vitória
1980	Vitória (9)	Galícia
1981	Bahia (31)	Vitória
1982	Bahia (32)	Galícia
1983	Bahia (33)	Catuense
1984	Bahia (34)	Leônico
1985	Vitória (10)	Bahia
1986	Bahia (35)	Catuense
1987	Bahia (36)	Catuense
1988	Bahia (37)	Vitória
1989	Vitória (11)	Bahia
1990	Vitória (12)	Fluminense de Feira
1991	Bahia (38)	Fluminense de Feira
1992	Vitória (13)	Bahia
1993	Bahia (39)	Vitória
1994	Bahia (40)	Vitória
1995	Vitória (14)	Galícia
1996	Vitória (15)	Bahia
1997	Vitória (16)	Bahia
1998	Bahia (41)	Vitória
1999	Bahia (42)	Tie for champion
1999	Vitória (17)	Tie for champion
2000	Vitória (18)	Bahia
2001	Bahia (43)	Juazeiro
2002	Vitória (19)	Fluminense de Feira
2003	Vitória (20)	Catuense
2004	Vitória (21)	Bahia
2005	Vitória (22)	Bahia
2006	Colo Colo (1)	Vitória
2007	Vitória (23)	Bahia
2008	Vitória (24)	Bahia
2009	Vitória (25)	Bahia
2010	Vitória (26)	Bahia
2011	Bahia de Feira (1)	Vitória
2012	Bahia (44)	Vitória
2013	Vitória (27)	Bahia
2014	Bahia (45)	Vitória
2015	Bahia (46)	Vitória da Conquista
2016	Vitória (28)	Bahia
2017	Vitória (29)	Bahia
2018	Bahia (47)	Vitória
2019	Bahia (48)	Bahia de Feira
2020	Bahia (49)	Atlético de Alagoinhas
2021	Atlético de Alagoinhas (1)	Bahia de Feira
2022	Atlético de Alagoinhas (2)	Jacuipense
2023	Bahia (50)	Jacuipense
2024	Vitória (30)	Bahia
2025	Bahia (51)	Vitória
2026	Bahia (52)	Vitória

== Titles by team ==
Teams in bold still active.

Rank	Club	Winners	Winning years	Runners-up	Runners-up years
1	**Bahia**	52	1931, 1933, 1934, 1936, 1938 (I), 1940, 1944, 1945, 1947, 1948, 1949, 1950, 1952, 1954, 1956, 1958, 1959, 1960, 1961, 1962, 1967, 1970, 1971, 1973, 1974, 1975, 1976, 1977, 1978, 1979, 1981, 1982, 1983, 1984, 1986, 1987, 1988, 1991, 1993, 1994, 1998, 1999 (shared), 2001, 2012, 2014, 2015, 2018, 2019, 2020, 2023, 2025, 2026	23	1941, 1955, 1957, 1963, 1964, 1969, 1972, 1985, 1989, 1992, 1996, 1997, 2000, 2004, 2005, 2007, 2008, 2009, 2010, 2013, 2016, 2017, 2024
2	**Vitória**	30	1908, 1909, 1953, 1955, 1957, 1964, 1965, 1972, 1980, 1985, 1989, 1990, 1992, 1995, 1996, 1997, 1999 (shared), 2000, 2002, 2003, 2004, 2005, 2007, 2008, 2009, 2010, 2013, 2016, 2017, 2024	32	1906, 1907, 1911, 1912, 1942, 1947, 1950, 1951, 1958, 1959, 1960, 1961, 1962, 1966, 1971, 1974, 1975, 1976, 1977, 1979, 1981, 1988, 1993, 1994, 1998, 2006, 2011, 2012, 2014, 2018, 2025, 2026
3	**Ypiranga**	10	1917, 1918, 1920, 1921, 1925, 1928, 1929, 1932, 1939, 1951	12	1915, 1924, 1926, 1927, 1931, 1933, 1937, 1938 (II), 1946, 1949, 1952, 1960
4	**Botafogo**	7	1919, 1922, 1923, 1926, 1930, 1935, 1938 (II)	9	1918, 1929, 1932, 1943, 1953, 1954, 1961, 1965, 1977
5	**Galícia**	5	1937, 1941, 1942, 1943, 1968	12	1935, 1936, 1938 (I), 1939, 1940, 1944, 1945, 1948, 1967, 1980, 1982, 1995
6	Fluminense	2	1913, 1915	6	1914, 1916, 1917, 1919, 1920, 1930
6	**Fluminense de Feira**	2	1963, 1969	6	1956, 1968, 1971, 1990, 1991, 2002
8	**Atlético de Alagoinhas**	2	2021, 2022	2	1973, 2020
9	São Salvador	2	1906, 1907	1	1905
10	AAB	1	1924	4	1921, 1922, 1923, 1925
11	**Bahia de Feira**	1	2011	2	2019, 2021
11	Bahiano de Tênis	1	1927	2	1924, 1928
11	**Leônico**	1	1966	2	1978, 1984
11	Santos Dumont	1	1910	2	1908, 1909
15	SC Internacional	1	1914	1	1913
16	Atlético	1	1911	0	—
16	**Colo Colo**	1	2006	0	—
16	Guarany	1	1946	0	—
16	Internacional de Cricket	1	1905	0	—
16	República	1	1916	0	—
16	SC Bahia	1	1911	0	—
22	**Catuense**	0	—	4	1983, 1986, 1987, 2003
23	**Jacuipense**	0	—	2	2022, 2023
24	Energia Circular	0	—	1	1934
24	**Itabuna**	0	—	1	1970
24	**Juazeiro**	0	—	1	2001
24	São Paulo Club	0	—	1	1910
24	**Vitória da Conquista**	0	—	1	2015

=== By city ===
City	Championships	Clubs
Salvador	118	Bahia (52), Vitória (30), Ypiranga (10), Botafogo (7), Galícia (5), Fluminense (2), São Salvador (2), AAB (1), Atlético (1), Bahiano de Tênis (1), Guarany (1), Internacional de Cricket (1), Leônico (1), República (1), Santos Dumont (1), SC Bahia (1), SC Internacional (1)
Feira de Santana	3	Fluminense de Feira (2), Bahia de Feira (1)
Alagoinhas	2	Atlético de Alagoinhas (2)
Ilhéus	1	Colo Colo (1)

== See also ==
- Campeonato Baiano Second Division
- Campeonato Baiano Third Division
